= NXT 2300 =

WWE television special

- Promotional poster featuring Tony D'Angelo, Trick Williams, Je'Von Evans, Jaida Parker, and Roxanne Perez
- Promotion: WWE
- Brand: NXT
- Date: November 6, 2024
- City: Philadelphia, Pennsylvania
- Venue: 2300 Arena

NXT special episodes chronology
| ← Previous; The Great American Bash | Next → New Year's Evil |

NXT 2300 was a professional wrestling television special produced by WWE for its developmental brand NXT. The event was broadcast live on November 6, 2024, from the 2300 Arena in Philadelphia, Pennsylvania as a special episode of NXT on The CW in the United States. In addition to NXT's roster and a guest from partner promotion Total Nonstop Action Wrestling (TNA), the event featured veterans of the defunct Extreme Championship Wrestling (ECW) as a tribute to 2300 Arena (formerly known to fans as the ECW Arena) being the prior home of that promotion.

The special aired on a Wednesday, preempted from its regular Tuesday timeslot due to the 2024 United States presidential election, and thus went head-to-head with rival promotion All Elite Wrestling's program, Dynamite (Held in Manchester, New Hampshire), in a reprisal of the Wednesday Night Wars. It defeated Dynamite in both viewership and key demographic ratings.

== Production ==
=== Background ===
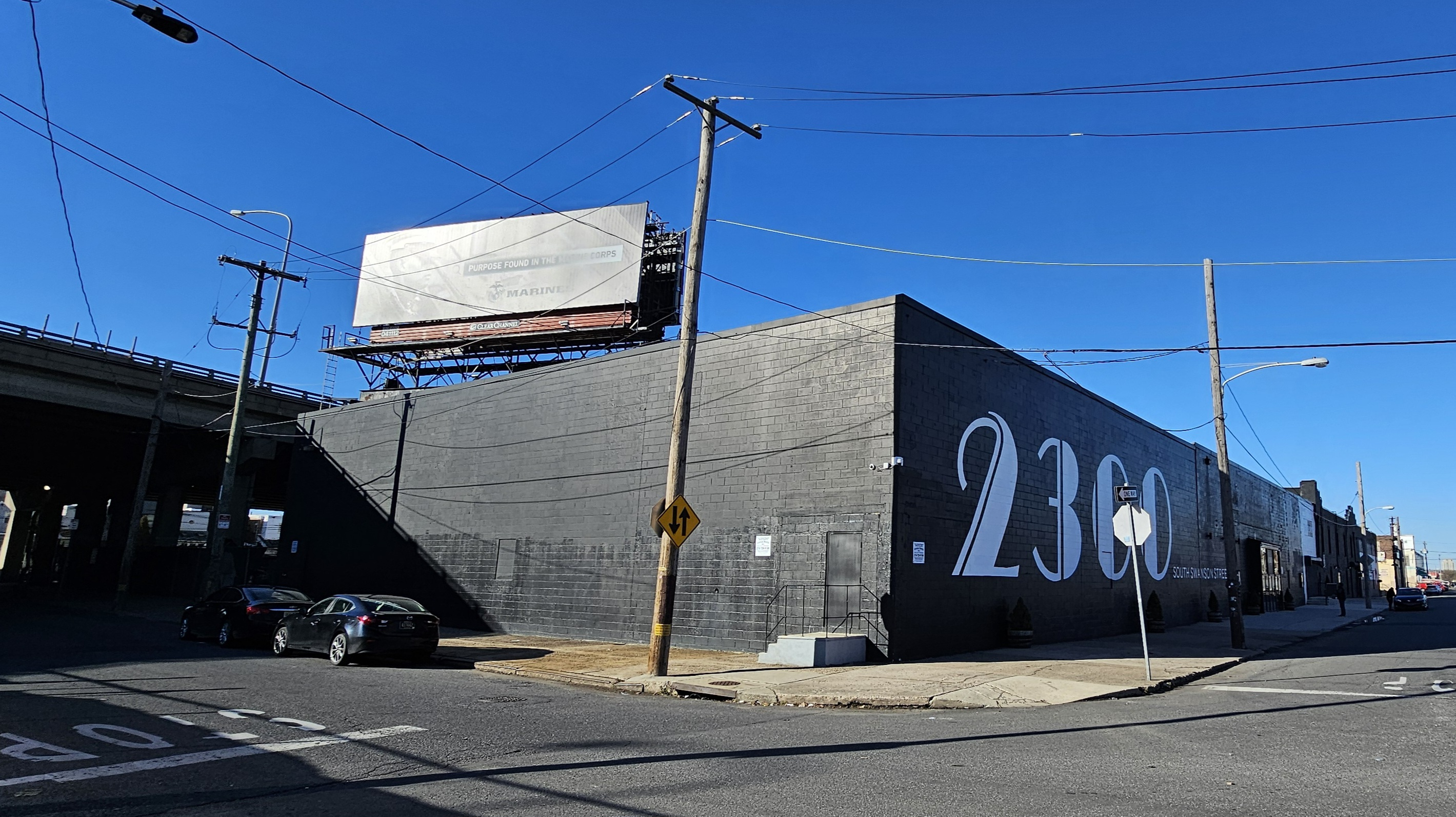
2300 Arena in Philadelphia, Pennsylvania, the site of NXT 2300

NXT is the weekly professional wrestling television program for WWE's developmental brand NXT. In October 2024, the program moved to The CW, after airing on USA Network since September 2019. On October 21, 2024, WWE announced a special episode of NXT titled NXT 2300 that would take place from the 2300 Arena in Philadelphia, Pennsylvania, which was the former home venue of the now-defunct Extreme Championship Wrestling (ECW) from 1993 to 2001 and was referred to as the ECW Arena. WWE acquired ECW's assets in 2001, and had previously ran a house show at the venue in June 2006 as part of their ECW revival.

The television special was scheduled for Wednesday, November 6, 2024, airing outside of NXT's normal Tuesday timeslot due to the 2024 United States presidential election, during which time the network aired coverage simulcast from its sibling cable channel NewsNation. NXT 2300 thus aired head-to-head with rival promotion All Elite Wrestling's program, Dynamite, in a reprisal of the Wednesday Night Wars.

Tickets for the event sold out in under 20 minutes. VIP ticket packages featuring a meet and greet with ECW veteran Bubba Ray Dudley were also available.

=== Storylines ===
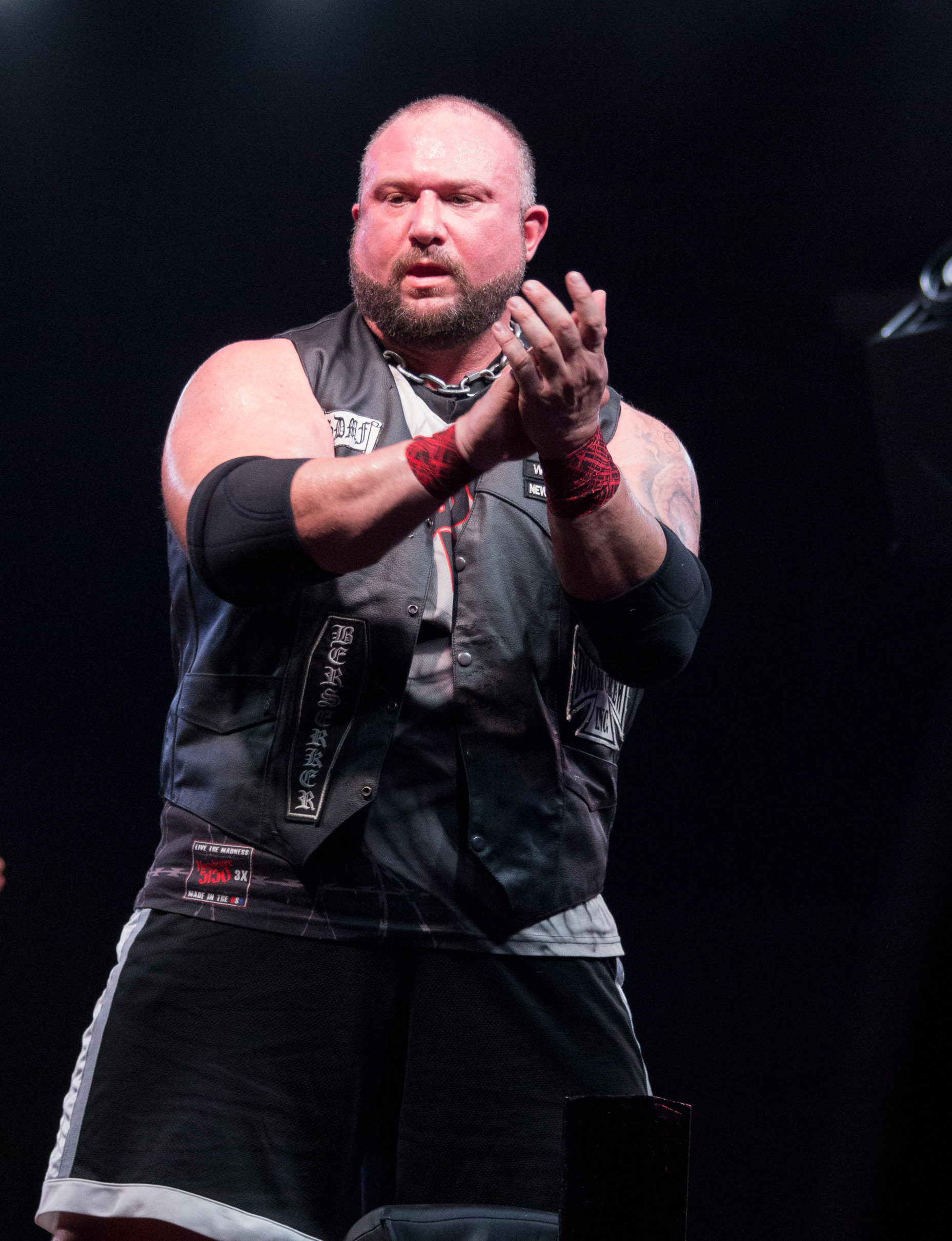
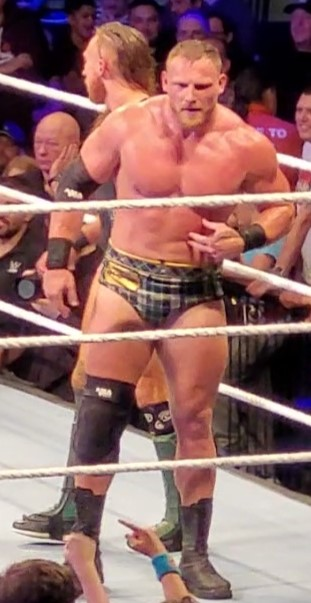
Bubba Ray Dudley (left), who agreed to team with Trick Williams against Ridge Holland (right) and Ethan Page at NXT 2300

The event was composed of matches that resulted from scripted storylines. Results were predetermined by WWE's writers on the NXT brand, while storylines were produced on WWE's weekly television program, NXT, and the supplementary online streaming show, Level Up.

Eight-time ECW World Tag Team Champion Bubba Ray Dudley appeared as a guest on the Halloween Havoc pre-show, where he was interrupted by Ridge Holland. Later on the main show, Dudley saved NXT Champion Trick Williams from an attack by Holland and Ethan Page. On the following episode of NXT, Williams requested that Dudley be his partner for a tag team match against Holland and Page at NXT 2300. Dudley initially declined, but later changed his mind and accepted Williams' request after Holland and Page called Dudley a nostalgia act and attacked him.

Through September 2024, Jaida Parker and Lola Vice had feuded with Fatal Influence (Jacy Jayne, Fallon Henley, and Jazmyn Nyx) while simultaneously feuding with each other. The two agreed to put their differences aside to team up against Jayne and Henley for NXT's October 1 premiere on The CW, which they lost after Parker walked out on Vice. At Halloween Havoc, NXT General Manager Ava announced that Parker and Vice would face each other in a Hardcore match at NXT 2300, with former ECW manager Dawn Marie serving as the special guest referee.

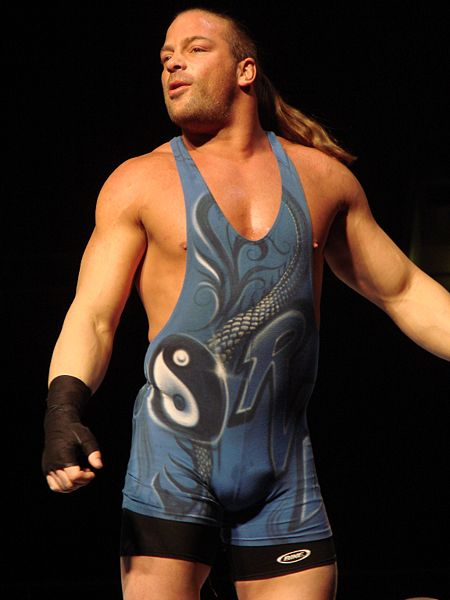
Rob Van Dam, who vowed to appear at NXT 2300

Former ECW World Heavyweight Champion Rob Van Dam appeared on the October 29 episode of NXT and informed NXT General Manager Ava that he wanted to participate at NXT 2300 in some capacity. After witnessing a backstage brawl between Je'Von Evans and Wes Lee at the end of the show, Van Dam indicated he knew exactly what he wanted to do at NXT 2300 before walking off. A singles match between Evans and Lee was later announced on social media for NXT 2300.

On the October 29 episode of NXT, Zaria defeated Brinley Reece in her WWE debut match. Following the match, Fatal Influence (Jacy Jayne, Fallon Henley, and Jazmyn Nyx) joined with Cora Jade and Roxanne Perez to surround the ring and intimidate Zaria. Zaria was saved by Giulia, Kelani Jordan, Stephanie Vaquer, and Jordynne Grace, the latter from NXT's partner promotion Total Nonstop Action Wrestling (TNA). After both sides brawled, a 10-woman tag team match between the two teams was announced for NXT 2300.

During the October 29 episode of NXT, NXT North American Champion Tony D'Angelo received a voicemail from two-time ECW World Tag Team Champion Nunzio, who revealed that he planned on confronting D'Angelo at NXT 2300.

On October 29, former ECW manager Francine announced on social media that she would be attending NXT 2300.

WWE revealed on social media that NXT General Manager Ava would be making a special announcement at NXT 2300.

== Event ==
Other on-screen personnel
| Role: | Name: |
|---|---|
| Commentators | Vic Joseph |
| Commentators | Booker T |
| Spanish commentators | Marcelo Rodríguez |
| Spanish commentators | Jerry Soto |
| Ring announcer | Mike Rome |
| Referees | Adrian Butler |
| Referees | Chip Danning |
| Referees | Dallas Irvin |
| Referees | Derek Sanders |
| Referees | Felix Fernandez |
| Interviewer | Sarah Schreiber |

The broadcast began with an introduction set to "This is Extreme!" by Harry Slash & The Slashtones, the theme song for ECW Hardcore TV and later ECW on TNN.

Bubba Ray Dudley and Trick Williams were shown conversing outside of Geno's Steaks.

=== Preliminary matches ===
In the opening contest of the broadcast, Jaida Parker took on Lola Vice in a Hardcore match with Dawn Marie serving as the special guest referee. Parker picked up the victory, pinning Vice after a Hipnotic.

Ethan Page and Ridge Holland cut a promo in front of the Rocky statue, promising that their opponents would not be lauded in a similar manner, and that no tables would be used in their match.

Rob Van Dam was seen stretching backstage with Kelani Jordan, who he gave advice to before she walked off. Van Dam was then attacked by Wes Lee.

At Tony Luke's, Nunzio appeared with fellow Full Blooded Italians (FBI) member Tony Mamaluke to confront Tony D'Angelo and The Family. Nunzio took offense to The Family coming into FBI's territory of Philadelphia, and challenged D'Angelo for a title shot later in the show.

The second contest of the broadcast was a singles match between Je'Von Evans and Wes Lee. After receiving assistance from Rob Van Dam, Evans won by pinfall after a Frog Splash.

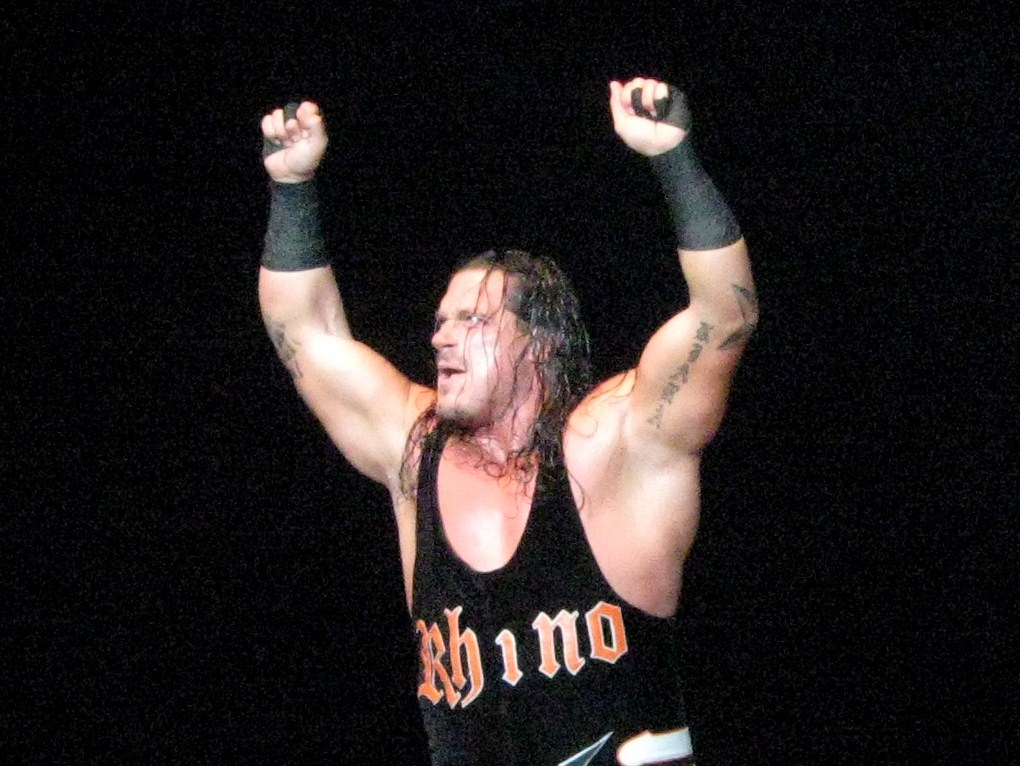
Rhyno, who made a surprise appearance to attack Mr. Stone at NXT 2300

Stevie Turner and Mr. Stone appeared backstage to praise NXT General Manager Ava. Eddy Thorpe tried to approach Ava, but she emphasized to him that they would talk at a later date. Ava then went to the ring with Turner and Stone to announce the location for NXT Deadline. Stone began antagonizing the Philadelphia fans, and after the lights went out, former ECW World Heavyweight Champion Rhyno appeared in the ring and Gored him.

Lash Legend and Jakara Jackson appeared backstage to confront the babyface team that would compete later in the main event.

The third contest of the evening was a tag team match between Ethan Page and Ridge Holland facing off against Bubba Ray Dudley and Trick Williams. Page and Holland scored the victory after Holland reversed Williams' kick into a roll-up pinfall. D-Von Dudley appeared afterward to supply Trick and his longtime partner Bubba with a table, which they double-chokeslammed Page through.

Ashante Adonis and Dion Lennox discussed dating backstage. Karmen Petrovic approached them, and Adonis flirted with Petrovic before walking off.

The main event heel team spoke backstage about their desire to win the match, as they desired to keep "newbies" out of the women's division.

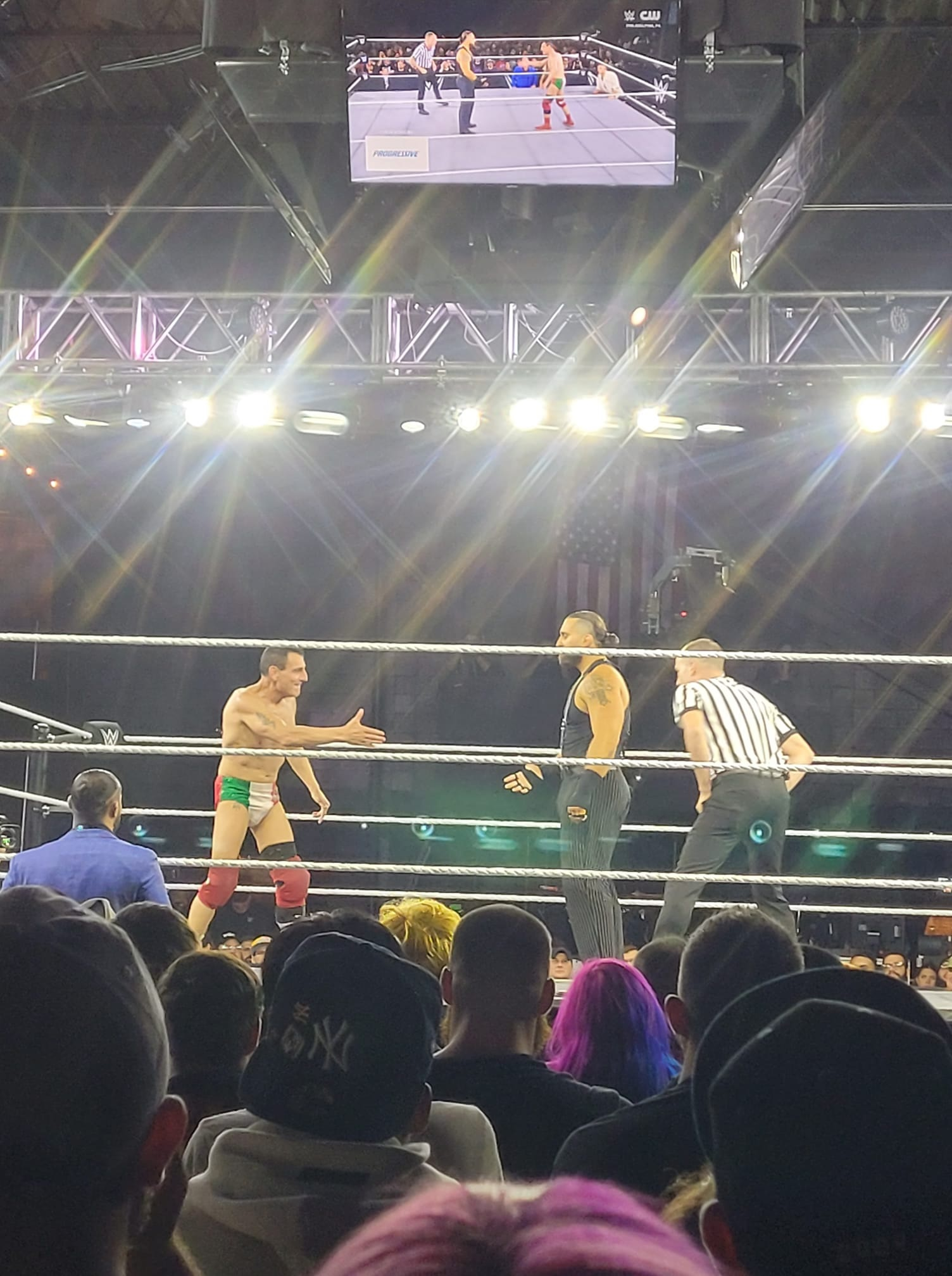
Tony D'Angelo (right) defending his NXT North American Championship against Nunzio at NXT 2300

In the penultimate match, Tony D'Angelo (with Adriana Rizzo, Channing "Stacks" Lorenzo, and Luca Crusifino) defended his NXT North American Championship against Nunzio (with Tony Mamaluke). D'Angelo successfully retained by pinfall after hitting Nunzio with a spinebuster. The FBI and The Family showed mutual respect to each other after the match.

Shawn Spears and Brooks Jensen were shown backstage watching D'Angelo's celebration, with Spears suggesting that they would confront The Family on the following week's episode.

Backstage footage from the previous week's episode was shown with Lexis King parting ways with William Regal. Regal's son Charlie Dempsey then appeared to seek advice from his father.

Outside of the venue, Ava informed the tag-team of Axiom and Nathan Frazer that they did not have a match scheduled. Frazer was pleased by this news, but Axiom was not.

Prior to the main event, Francine was shown sitting ringside, leading the crowd in an "ECW" chant.

=== Main event ===
In the main event, the babyface team of Giulia, Jordynne Grace, Kelani Jordan, Stephanie Vaquer, and Zaria faced off with the heel team of Fatal Influence (Fallon Henley, Jacy Jayne, and Jazmyn Nyx), Cora Jade, and Roxanne Perez in a 10-woman tag team match. Lash Legend and Jakara Jackson tried to interfere, but were neutralized by the babyfaces. Zaria picked up the victory for her team by pinning Perez.

== Reception ==
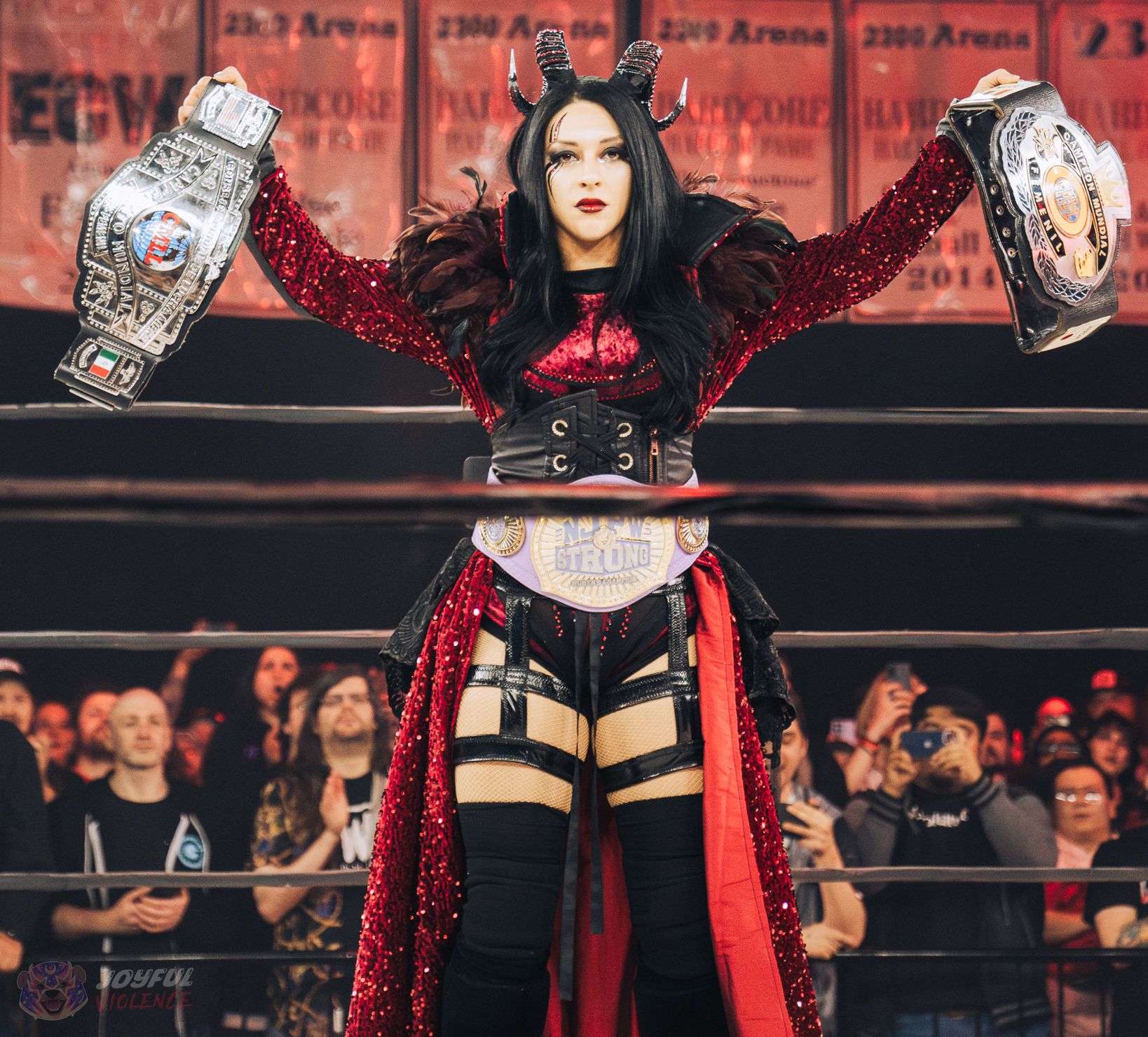
Stephanie Vaquer, whose team was victorious in the well-received main event of NXT 2300

NXT 2300's broadcast on The CW drew 619,000 viewers with a 0.17 key demographic rating, defeating AEW Dynamite on TBS, which drew 523,000 viewers with a 0.16 key demographic rating. The 10-woman tag team main event of NXT 2300 drew 170,000 more viewers than the tag team main event of AEW Dynamite, which featured Kyle Fletcher and Konosuke Takeshita against Ricochet and Powerhouse Hobbs.

Reviews of the show were overwhelmingly favorable. Critics acknowledged that NXT 2300 used veteran talent sparingly to put over NXT's younger stars, thereby avoiding the pitfalls of past ECW reunions. Dave LaGreca of Busted Open and Sam Roberts of Notsam Wrestling praised the strength of NXT's women's division, and the faith WWE had in them to both open and close the show.

Dave Meltzer of Wrestling Observer Newsletter gave the 10-woman tag team main event a 4-star rating.

== Aftermath ==
Talent involved with the show expressed a desire for NXT to return to 2300 Arena, and also for the brand to tour other intimate venues. WWE then announced that they would broadcast NXT from Lowell Memorial Auditorium on December 17, 2024.

== Results ==
| No. | Results | Stipulations | Times |
|---|---|---|---|
| 1 | Jaida Parker defeated Lola Vice by pinfall | Hardcore match Dawn Marie was special guest referee. | 14:44 |
| 2 | Je'Von Evans defeated Wes Lee by pinfall | Singles match | 12:18 |
| 3 | Ethan Page and Ridge Holland defeated Bubba Ray Dudley and Trick Williams by pinfall | Tag team match | 10:17 |
| 4 | Tony D'Angelo (c) (with Adriana Rizzo, Channing "Stacks" Lorenzo, and Luca Crusifino) defeated Nunzio (with Tony Mamaluke) by pinfall | Singles match for the NXT North American Championship | 2:19 |
| 5 | Giulia, Jordynne Grace, Kelani Jordan, Stephanie Vaquer, and Zaria defeated Cora Jade, Roxanne Perez, and Fatal Influence (Fallon Henley, Jacy Jayne, and Jazmyn Nyx) by pinfall | 10-woman tag team match | 14:57 |
(c) / – the champion(s) heading into the match
