= NXT Halloween Havoc (2024) =

WWE premium live event

- Promotional poster featuring Trick Williams, Roxanne Perez, Giulia, Oba Femi, Ethan Page, and Kelani Jordan
- Promotion: WWE
- Brand: NXT
- Date: October 27, 2024
- City: Hershey, Pennsylvania
- Venue: Giant Center
- Attendance: 4,940

WWE event chronology
← Previous; Bad Blood	Next → Crown Jewel

Halloween Havoc chronology
← Previous; 2023	Next → 2025

NXT major events chronology
← Previous; No Mercy	Next → Deadline

The 2024 NXT Halloween Havoc was a professional wrestling premium live event (PLE) produced by WWE, held exclusively for wrestlers from the promotion's developmental brand, NXT. It was WWE's fifth annual NXT Halloween Havoc and the 17th Halloween Havoc overall. It took place on Sunday, October 27, 2024, at the Giant Center in Hershey, Pennsylvania.

This was the second NXT Halloween Havoc to be held as a PLE, after 2022, as the 2020, 2021, and 2023 events were held as television specials of NXT, and also returned the event to one night as the 2023 edition was a two-night event. It was also NXT's first PLE to solely use the WWE branding. This was also the first Halloween Havoc to air on Disney+ in the Philippines and Abema in Japan, and the final to air on the standalone WWE Network in most other international markets due to its content merging under Netflix in January 2025; it was also the only Halloween Havoc to air on Binge in Australia, which also moved to Netflix in January, and the last on SonyLIV in India, which moved to Netflix in April 2025. It was also the third Halloween Havoc held in the U.S. state of Pennsylvania, after the inaugural event in 1989 and the 1992 event.

Five matches were contested at the event. In the main event, Trick Williams defeated Ethan Page in a Spin the Wheel, Make the Deal: Devil's Playground match to retain the NXT Championship. In another prominent match, Giulia and Stephanie Vaquer defeated Roxanne Perez and Cora Jade in a tag team match, and in the opening bout, Tony D'Angelo defeated Oba Femi in a Spin the Wheel, Make the Deal: Tables, Ladders, and Scares match to retain the NXT North American Championship. This event was notable for the appearance of WWE Hall of Famer Bubba Ray Dudley.

The event received negative reviews from critics.

== Production ==
=== Background ===
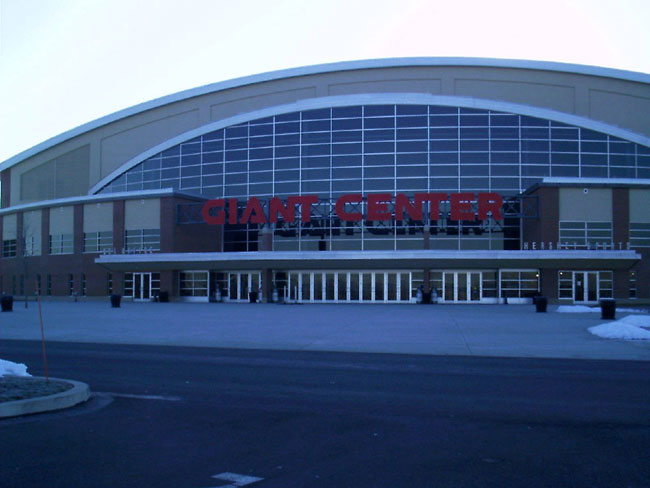
NXT's fifth annual Halloween Havoc, and the 17th Halloween Havoc overall, was held at the Giant Center in Hershey, Pennsylvania, which was WWE's first major event in the city since Unforgiven in 2003.

Halloween Havoc is a professional wrestling event established in 1989, held in October as part of the month's Halloween festivities. It was originally produced as an annual pay-per-view (PPV) event by the former World Championship Wrestling (WCW) from 1989 until 2000. Following WWE's acquisition of WCW in March 2001, WWE reinstated Halloween Havoc as an annual event for its developmental brand, NXT, in 2020. The 2020, 2021, and 2023 events were held as television specials of the NXT program on the USA Network, but for 2022, it was a premium live event (PLE). The 2023 edition was also two nights.

On July 15, 2024, it was announced that NXT Halloween Havoc would return as a one-night PLE. NXT's fifth Halloween Havoc, and the 17th Halloween Havoc overall, was scheduled to take place on Sunday, October 27, 2024, at Giant Center in Hershey, Pennsylvania, marking the first NXT Halloween Havoc to take place outside of the brand's home venue, the WWE Performance Center in Orlando, Florida. Additionally, following NXT's premiere on The CW earlier in October, the 2024 Halloween Havoc became NXT's first PLE to solely use the WWE branding instead of the NXT branding.

=== Broadcast outlets ===
The PLE was broadcast on WWE's livestreaming platforms. These included Peacock in the United States, SonyLIV in India, Disney+ Hotstar in Indonesia, Disney+ in the Philippines, Binge in Australia, Abema in Japan, and the WWE Network everywhere else. This marked the first Halloween Havoc to air on Disney+, Binge, and Abema, after those countries' respective versions of the WWE Network merged under those services in November 2022, January 2023, and October 2023, respectively.

Following an announcement made on January 23, this was the final Halloween Havoc to air on the standalone WWE Network in most international markets where it was still available, as well as Disney+ Hotstar and Binge, as its content moved to Netflix in January 2025; a select few territories maintained the standalone WWE Network until early 2026 due to pre-existing contracts before they also merged under Netflix when those contracts expired.

=== Storylines ===
The event comprised five matches that resulted from scripted storylines. Results were predetermined by WWE's writers on the NXT brand, while storylines were produced on WWE's weekly television program, NXT, and the supplementary online streaming show, Level Up.

During NXT's CW premiere episode on October 1, a vignette aired with an unidentified wrestler approaching a road sign with the numbers "10" and "27". Several observers interpreted the vignette as indicating Australian wrestler Delta would debut at Halloween Havoc. A follow-up vignette that aired on the October 22 episode revealed that Delta would be coming to NXT, but under the name Zaria; she then appeared in person to close the show.

At Heatwave, Ethan Page defeated Trick Williams to win the NXT Championship in a fatal four-way match which also involved Je'Von Evans, the latter of whom Page pinned. Williams vowed to regain the championship from Page, which he did on NXT's CW premiere episode on October 1 with Raw's CM Punk as the special guest referee. The following week, Williams celebrated his victory, only to be interrupted by Wes Lee, who stated that he would take the title from Williams. Later that night, Page blamed Punk for losing the title and demanded a rematch. At the end of the show, NXT General Manager Ava announced that Lee, Page, and Evans, the latter of whom Ava added to the match after being impressed by his performance against SmackDown's Randy Orton, would compete in a triple threat match the following week to determine the challenger for Williams at Halloween Havoc, which was won by Page. After the match, Page spun the Spin the Wheel, Make the Deal wheel, landing on the Devil's Playground match, which was made official for Halloween Havoc.

On the October 8 episode of NXT, Tony D'Angelo defeated Oba Femi to win the NXT North American Championship, ending Femi's reign at a record-setting 273 days. The following week, D'Angelo celebrated his title win before Femi interrupted him. Femi announced that a rematch would take place at Halloween Havoc. Femi then spun the Spin the Wheel, Make the Deal wheel, confirming that the match stipulation would be a Tables, Ladders, and Scares match. On October 22, NXT General Manager Ava announced that the match would only be decided by pinfall.

On NXT's CW premiere episode on October 1, Roxanne Perez defeated Giulia to retain the NXT Women's Championship. In the closing moments, Perez attempted to use the championship belt to strike Giulia with it, only for a hooded individual to attack Giulia, costing her the match. After the match, the hooded individual was revealed to be the returning Cora Jade. The following week, Jade stated why she attacked Giulia, feeling as if the fans forgot about her while she was recovering from her ACL injury and that she and Perez were working on mending their friendship. Giulia appeared, albeit with former rival Stephanie Vaquer by her side as a brawl ensued between the four women. The following week, Vaquer defeated Wren Sinclair in her NXT debut match, only for Jade and Perez to ambush her before Giulia came to her defense. Vaquer and Giulia then challenged Jade and Perez to a tag team match at Halloween Havoc, which was later confirmed.

On the June 18 episode of NXT, Ridge Holland was accepted as an official member of Chase University despite initial pushback from Riley Osborne and Duke Hudson. On the August 13 episode of NXT, Holland and Andre Chase defeated Nathan Frazer and Axiom to win the NXT Tag Team Championship but lost the title back to them at No Mercy. After the match, Holland viciously attacked Chase, defecting from Chase U and reverting to a heel in the process. Chase was subsequently strechered out of the arena and taken by ambulance to a hospital. After his defection, Holland vowed to take down Chase U. On the September 10 episode of NXT, Holland defeated Hudson and took out Hudson with the barricade after the match. On the October 15 episode of NXT, Chase returned to save Osborne from being taken out by Holland after their match. The following week, Chase challenged Holland to an Ambulance match at Halloween Havoc, which was made official.

Since September, Fatal Influence (Jacy Jayne, Fallon Henley, and Jazmyn Nyx) had been feuding with NXT Women's North American Champion Kelani Jordan, setting their sights on the title. On the October 22 episode of NXT, it was announced that Jordan would defend the championship at Halloween Havoc against one member of Fatal Influence; however, she would not know which member until the event. Later that night, Jordan prevented Nyx from interfering in Jayne and Henley's match against Giulia and Stephanie Vaquer, which they ultimately lost. After the match, Jayne spun the Spin the Wheel, Make the Deal wheel, landing on Spinner's Choice, allowing Fatal Influence to choose the stipulation for the match at Halloween Havoc, and they chose a Gauntlet match.

== Event ==
Other on-screen personnel
Role:	Name:
Commentators	Vic Joseph
Commentators	Booker T
Spanish commentators	Marcelo Rodríguez
Spanish commentators	Jerry Soto
Ring announcer	Mike Rome
Referees	Adrian Butler
Referees	Chip Danning
Referees	Dallas Irvin
Referees	Derek Sanders
Referees	Felix Fernandez
Interviewer	Sarah Schreiber
Pre-show panel	Megan Morant
Pre-show panel	Sam Roberts
Pre-show panel	Dave LaGreca
Pre-show panel	Bubba Ray Dudley

=== Preliminary matches ===
The PLE began with Tony D'Angelo defending the NXT North American Championship against Oba Femi in a Tables, Ladders, and Scares match. During the match, D'Angelo's stablemates, Channing "Stacks" Lorenzo, Luca Crusifino, and Adriana Rizzo, appeared, but were taken out by Femi, who took a crowbar away from Rizzo. D'Angelo then speared Femi off the apron through a bridge ladder. Femi performed a powerbomb on D'Angelo for a nearfall. In the end, as Femi attempted another powerbomb, Rizzo and Crusifino struck him with a crowbar and a steel chair, respectively, and Lorenzo and Crusifino performed Shatter Machine on Femi. D'Angelo then performed a spinebuster on Femi through a table to retain the title.

In the second match, NXT Women's Champion Roxanne Perez and Cora Jade took on Giulia and Stephanie Vaquer. In the end, Giulia suplexed Perez from the ropes and Vaquer pinned Perez with a corkscrew dive to win the match. Afterwards, Zaria was shown looking at Perez, Jade, Giulia, and Vaquer.

After that, Ridge Holland took on Andre Chase in an ambulance match. During the match, Chase performed a DDT on Holland onto the announce table. Chase hit Holland with a stretcher board and threw a pumpkin at Holland. Chase followed up with a cannonball dive from the top of the ambulance on Holland. Holland prevented the doors from closing and gouged the eyes of Chase. Holland followed up by swinging the ambulance door into Chase, catapulting Chase into the doors, and performing a DDT on Chase before tossing him into the ambulance and closing the doors to win the match.

In the penultimate match, Kelani Jordan defended the NXT Women's North American Championship against Jazmyn Nyx, Jacy Jayne, and Fallon Henley in a gauntlet match. Jordan eliminated Nyx after an Angle Slam and a 450 splash. Jayn performed a running knee strike on Jordan for a nearfall. Jordan ducked a rolling elbow and pinned Jayne with a rollup to eliminate her. Henley entered last and performed a middle-rope neckbreaker on Jordan for a nearfall. In the end, distractions by Nyx and Jayne allowed Henley to counter the 450 splash by putting her knees up. Henley then performed a shining wizard on Jordan to win the title. After the match, Zaria appeared and laid out Nyx, Jayne, and Henley.

=== Main event ===
In the main event, Trick Williams defended the NXT Championship against Ethan Page in a Devil's Playground match. During the match, Page performed an Ego's Edge on a bloodied Williams through a table for a nearfall. Officials arrived to check on Williams, who decided to keep going. In the end, Page performed a low blow on Williams, who later performed the same move on Page. Williams then struck Page with the steel steps and pinned him following the Trick Shot to retain the title. After the match, Ridge Holland joined Page in attacking Williams before being saved by Bubba Ray Dudley.

== Reception ==
Jason Powell of Pro Wrestling Dot Net stated that Halloween Havoc belonged in the "fine if you saw it, fine if you missed it" category. The main event featured "a standard WWE hardcore style brawl". For the NXT Women's North American Championship match, Powell wondered if WWE made "the same mistake they did with Roxanne Perez by rushing a belt on her too quickly" as they did with Kelani Jordan, who "hasn't fully connected with the audience". For the NXT North American Championship match, Powell stated that it was "weak" to have Tony D'Angelo's sidekicks "play such a big part in the finish", but it "was a pretty good hardcore brawl otherwise".

Kevin Berge of Bleacher Report gave the overall event a grade of D+, calling it the "worst show NXT has produced all year" and "a premium live event that hardly felt like one", while stating that the better moments "were lost in the shuffle of rough booking". Berge assumed that the event could have been better "with greater stakes that focused most clearly on the talent at the heart of NXT". The lowest rated match was the ambulance match, which received a grade of D, and the highest rated match was the NXT Championship match, which received a grade of B+.

== Aftermath ==
Zaria wrestled her debut WWE match on the following episode of NXT, defeating Brinley Reece. Zaria would then qualify for the women's Iron Survivor Challenge at Deadline by defeating Wren Sinclair on the November 19 episode. Stephanie Vaquer and Giulia would also qualify for the match on the November 19 and 26 episodes, respectively.

Also on NXT, Ethan Page vowed to win back the NXT Championship, only to be interrupted by Ridge Holland, who put himself as the next challenger. Bubba Ray Dudley then appeared and suffered an attack by Page and Holland until NXT Champion Trick Williams made the save. Later, it was announced that Dudley would team with Williams to take on Page and Holland at NXT 2300 on November 6, which Holland and Page won when Holland pinned Williams. On the November 12 episode of NXT, a match between Holland and Andre Chase was scheduled for the following week with the stipulation that the winner would challenge Williams for the NXT Championship at Deadline and if Chase lost, Chase University would have to disband. The match was won by Holland.

In addition to the majority of countries moving to Netflix in January 2025, this would also be the final Halloween Havoc to air on SonyLIV in India following the expiration of WWE's contract with SonyLIV with India then moving to Netflix on April 1, 2025.

== Results ==
No.	Results	Stipulations	Times
1	Tony D'Angelo (c) defeated Oba Femi by pinfall	Spin the Wheel, Make the Deal: Tables, Ladders, and Scares match for the NXT North American Championship; The match could only be won by pinfall or submission.	15:20
2	Giulia and Stephanie Vaquer defeated Cora Jade and Roxanne Perez by pinfall	Tag team match	14:15
3	Ridge Holland defeated Andre Chase by trapping him in the ambulance with the doors completely closed	Ambulance match	14:30
4	Fallon Henley defeated Kelani Jordan (c) by pinfall	Spin the Wheel, Make the Deal: Spinner's Choice match for the NXT Women's North American Championship; Fatal Influence chose a Gauntlet match, with all three participating in this order: Jazmyn Nyx, Jacy Jayne, and Fallon Henley.	14:15
5	Trick Williams (c) defeated Ethan Page by pinfall	Spin the Wheel, Make the Deal: Devil's Playground match for the NXT Championship	18:00
(c) / – the champion(s) heading into the match

=== Gauntlet match ===
Elimination	Wrestler	Eliminated by	Elimination move	Times
1	Jazmyn Nyx	Kelani Jordan	Pinned after a 450 splash	3:35
2	Jacy Jayne	Kelani Jordan	Pinned with a roll-up	8:00
3	Kelani Jordan	Fallon Henley	Pinned after a shining wizard	14:15
Winner:	Fallon Henley	—N/a		14:15
