= The D'Angelo Family =

Professional wrestling stable

Stable
- Name(s): The D'Angelo Family; The Family
- Leader: Tony D'Angelo
- Members: Channing "Stacks" Lorenzo; Troy "Two Dimes" Donovan; Santos Escobar; Cruz Del Toro; Elektra Lopez; Joaquin Wilde; Adriana Rizzo; Luca Crusifino
- Debut: April 19, 2022
- Disbanded: July 15, 2025
- Years active: 2022–2025

The D'Angelo Family was an American professional wrestling stable that performed in WWE on the NXT brand. The stable consisted of leader and namesake Tony D'Angelo, Channing "Stacks" Lorenzo, Troy "Two Dimes" Donovan, Adriana Rizzo, and Luca Crusifino. For a short time, the stable also included Legado del Fantasma (Santos Escobar, Cruz Del Toro, Elektra Lopez, and Joaquin Wilde).

The stable's gimmick was that of an Italian mafia crime family, with D'Angelo serving as the "Don" of the family. During the group's formation, D'Angelo held the NXT Heritage Cup Championship, NXT North American Championship, and NXT Tag Team Championship with Lorenzo twice during their time with the group.

== History ==
=== Beginnings and addition of Legado del Fantasma (2021–2023) ===
During Tony's vignettes in 2021 he mentioned and rhyming off names of the real D'Angelo Family along with the Family members and they were not seen on NXT when Tony made his debut On October 5th, 2021, On the April 26 episode of NXT, Tony D'Angelo introduced Channing "Stacks" Lorenzo and Troy "Two Dimes" Donovan as his henchmen who attacked Santos Escobar the previous week, forming a stable called The D'Angelo Family. At NXT In Your House on June 4, The D'Angelo Family defeated Legado del Fantasma (Escobar, Cruz Del Toro and Joaquin Wilde). As per the stipulation, Legado del Fantasma had to join The D'Angelo Family. On June 11, Two Dimes was released by WWE. On the June 21 episode of NXT, D'Angelo challenged Carmelo Hayes for the NXT North American Championship, but lost after interference from Escobar. D'Angelo and Stacks faced The Creed Brothers (Brutus Creed and Julius Creed) for the NXT Tag Team Championship on the August 2 episode of NXT but again lost due to Escobar's interference. On the August 16 episode of NXT: Heatwave, D'Angelo defeated Escobar in a Street Fight and, as per the stipulation, Legado del Fantasma had to remain linked to The D'Angelo Family while Escobar had to (kayfabe) leave NXT.

D'Angelo faced Wes Lee for the NXT North American Championship on the December 27 episode of NXT but lost after interference from Dijak. The following week on NXT, D'Angelo turned face by challenging Dijak to a match at NXT: New Year's Evil on January 10, 2023, which he lost. He then defeated Dijak on the March 7 episode of NXT: Roadblock in a Jailhouse Street Fight. At NXT Stand & Deliver on April 1, D'Angelo and Stacks failed to win the NXT Tag Team Championship in a triple threat match. The D'Angelo Family entered a brief feud with Pretty Deadly, defeating them on April 25 at Spring Breakin' in a trunk match.

=== Championship success (2023–2025) ===
On July 30, at NXT: The Great American Bash, D'Angelo and Stacks defeated Gallus to win the NXT Tag Team Championship, the first championship in his wrestling career. They defeated The Dyad (Rip Fowler and Jagger Reid) in their first title defense on the August 15 episode of NXT. At NXT No Mercy on September 30, D'Angelo and Stacks retained the titles against Out the Mud (Lucien Price and Bronco Nima), The Creed Brothers, and Angel Garza and Humberto Carrillo in a fatal four-way tag team match. On the October 24 episode of NXT: Halloween Havoc, D'Angelo and Stacks lost the titles to Chase University (Andre Chase and Duke Hudson), ending their first reign at 86 days, but they would later regain the titles from Chase and Hudson on the November 14 episode of NXT. During this time, Adriana Rizzo became a part of the D'Angelo Family, feuding with Price, Nima and Jaida Parker of OTM, leading to a six-person mixed tag team match at NXT Vengeance Day on February 4, which the D'Angelo Family won. On the February 13, 2024 episode of NXT, D'Angelo and Stacks lost the titles to Dusty Rhodes Tag Team Classic winners Bron Breakker and Baron Corbin, ending their second reign at 91 days.

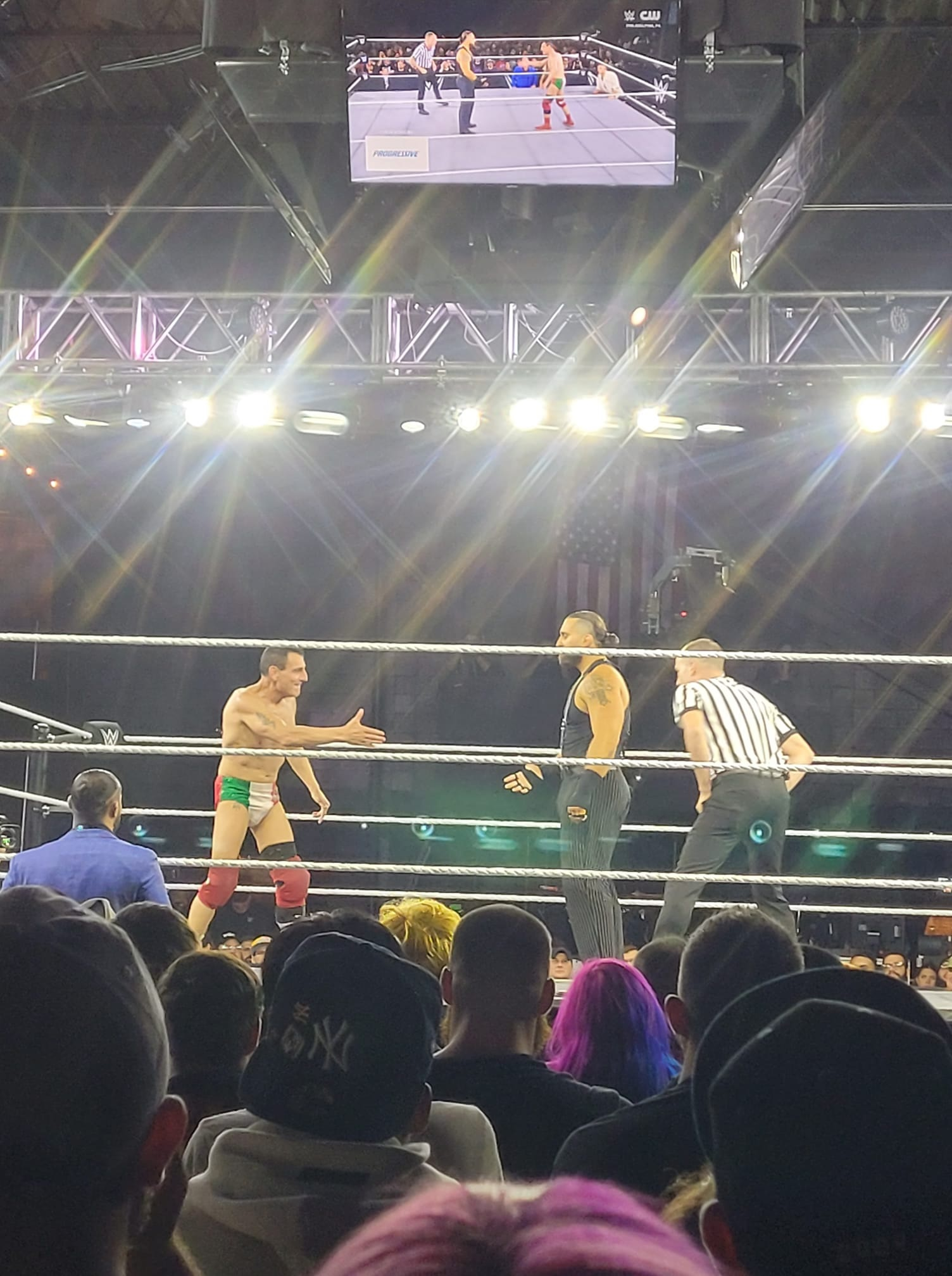
D'Angelo (right) facing Nunzio at NXT 2300.

On the February 27 episode of NXT, D'Angelo interrupted the contract signing between Carmelo Hayes and NXT Champion Ilja Dragunov, willing to earn a title shot at the NXT Championship. NXT General Manager Ava set a match between Hayes and D'Angelo at NXT: Roadblock to determine who would face Dragunov for the NXT Championship at NXT Stand & Deliver. At NXT: Roadblock on March 5, D'Angelo introduced Luca Crusifino as the "consigliere" of The D'Angelo Family and used Trick Williams' entrance music to distract and defeat Hayes. At NXT Stand & Deliver on April 6, D'Angelo failed to win the title from Dragunov. On the April 16 episode of NXT, D'Angelo revealed that his Family were hired by No Quarter Catch Crew (Charlie Dempsey, Damon Kemp, and Myles Borne) to (kayfabe) eliminate their leader Drew Gulak. D'Angelo demanded payment for the job but NQCC refused, causing a brawl between the two factions and resulting in a six-man tag team match between the two factions at Spring Breakin' on April 23, which was won by The D'Angelo Family. On the May 7 episode of NXT, Dempsey and Borne faced Tyson Dupont and Tyriek Igwe. Before the match started, the referee was declared "unavailable" and Stacks was announced as the special guest referee, costing Dempsey and Borne the match through a fast count. After the match, an irate Dempsey gave D'Angelo a title shot at the NXT Heritage Cup as payment due to the D'Angelo Family and invoked the Catch Clause, which was then nullified when D'Angelo and his Family kidnapped Kemp and Borne later that night. On the following episode of NXT, D'Angelo defeated Dempsey 2–1 in British Rounds Rules to win the Cup, his first singles championship in WWE. He lost the Cup back to Dempsey on the August 13 episode of NXT after outside interference from NQCC's new stablemate Wren Sinclair, ending his reign at 90 days.

At NXT No Mercy on September 1, D'Angelo failed to win the NXT North American Championship from Oba Femi. However, the following month, D'Angelo defeated Femi in a rematch on the October 8 episode of NXT to win the title, ending Femi's record-setting title reign at 273 days and becoming the first wrestler to win the NXT Tag Team, Heritage Cup and North American Championships. At Halloween Havoc on October 27, D'Angelo defeated Femi in a Tables, Ladders and Scares match to retain the title. At NXT 2300 on November 6, he successfully defended the title against Nunzio. On the December 10 episode of NXT, he defeated Ethan Page to retain the title. In early 2025, The D'Angelo Family started a feud with Shawn Spears and his stable over Izzi Dame. On the March 4 episode of NXT, D'Angelo lost the title to Spears, ending his reign at 147 days.

=== Dissolution (2025) ===
At NXT Stand & Deliver on April 19, 2025, during the six-man tag team match between The D'Angelo Family against DarkState (Dion Lennox, Saquon Shugars and Osiris Griffin), Lorenzo turned on D'Angelo after months of D'Angelo distrusting Lorenzo. This led to a match at Battleground, where D’Angelo lost to Lorenzo due to a distraction from Luca Crusifino. A week later, Crusifino attacked D'Angelo and Lorenzo during a face off and announced that he was leaving The D'Angelo Family. On the July 15 episode of NXT, D'Angelo defeated Lorenzo and Crusifino in a triple threat match and effectively disbanded The D'Angelo Family stable. Luca Crusifino was released by WWE on April 24 and has retired, while Adrianna Rizzo followed suit on September 4.

== Members ==
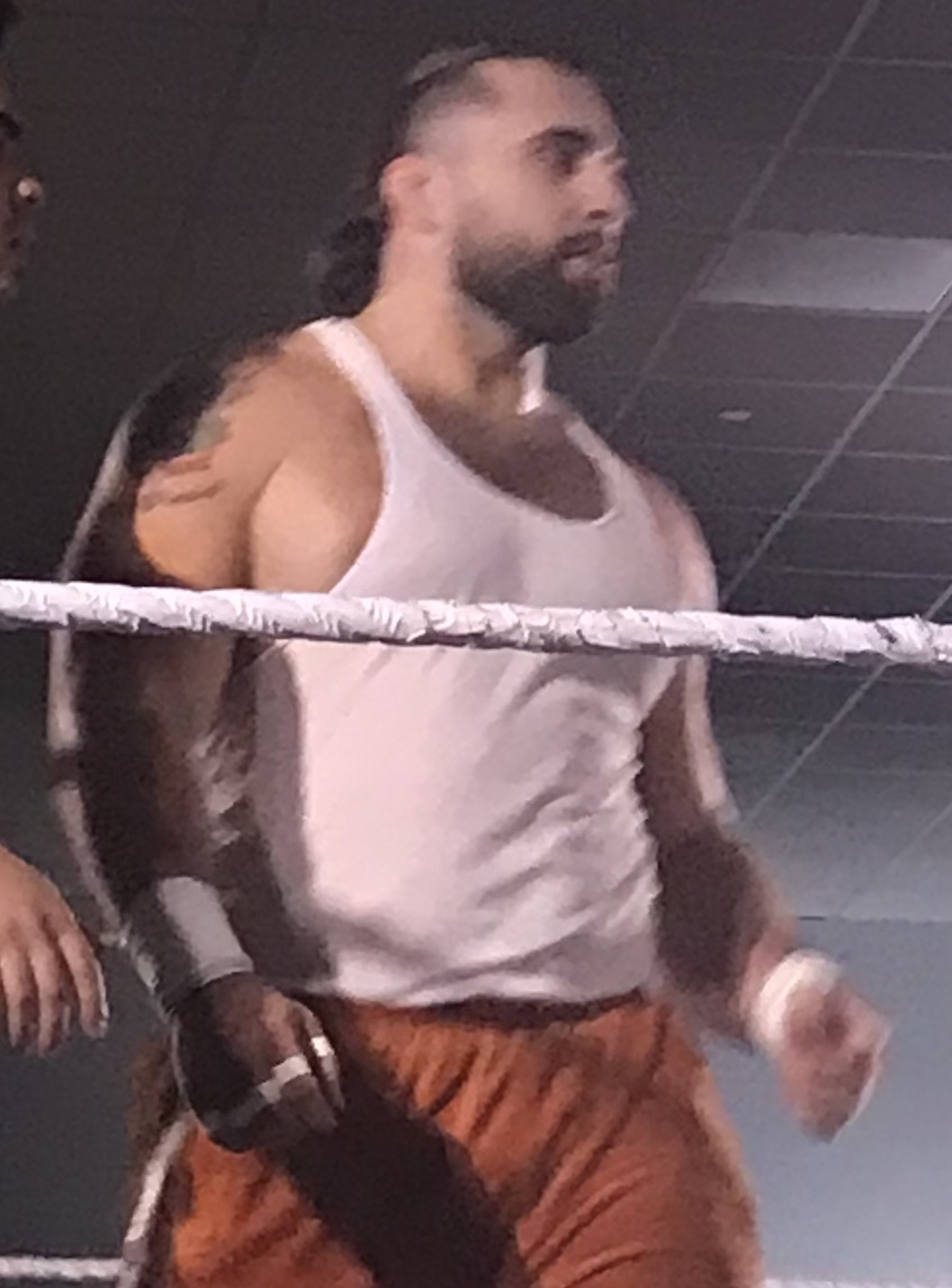
Tony D'Angelo (L)

Troy "Two Dimes" Donovan

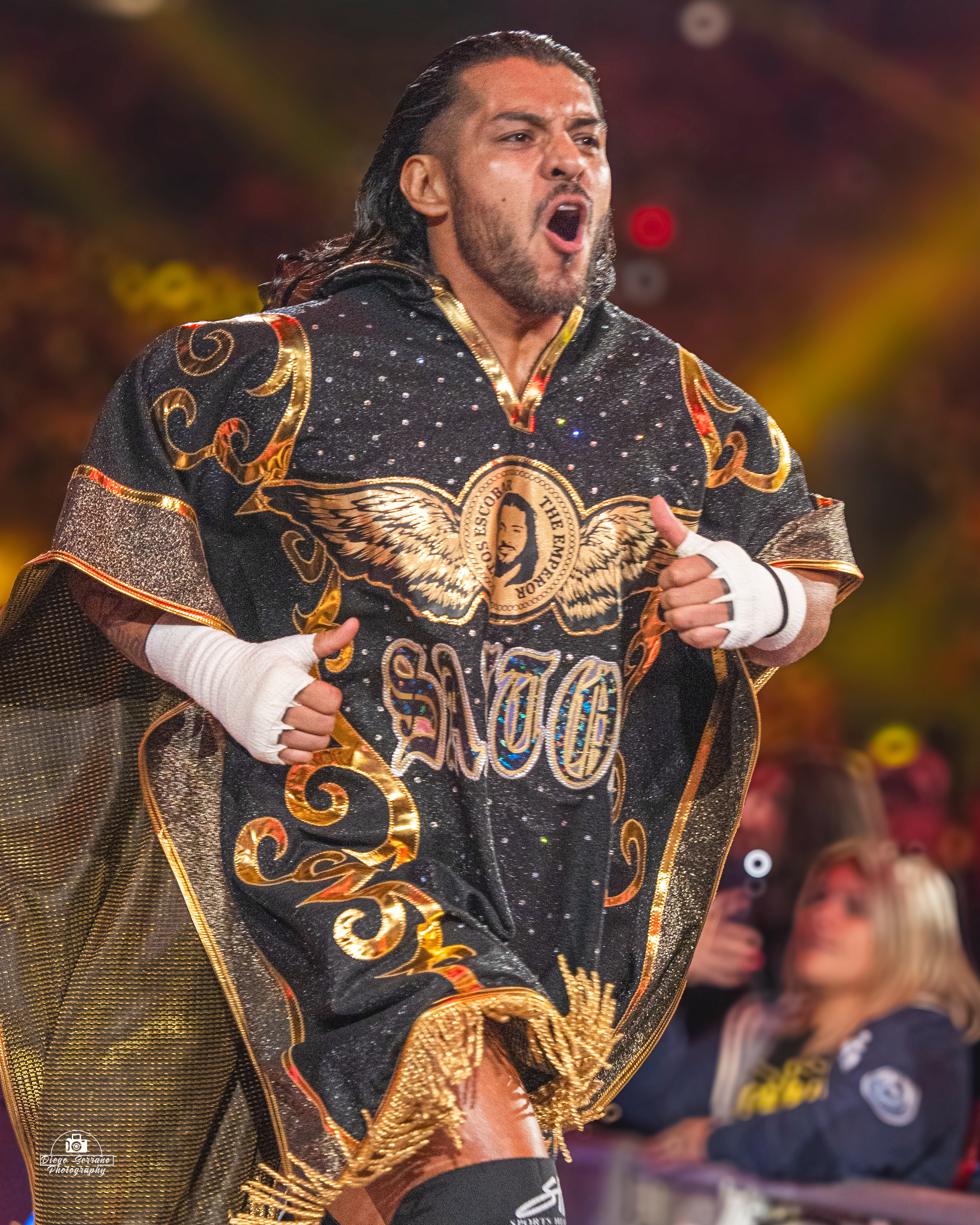
Santos Escobar

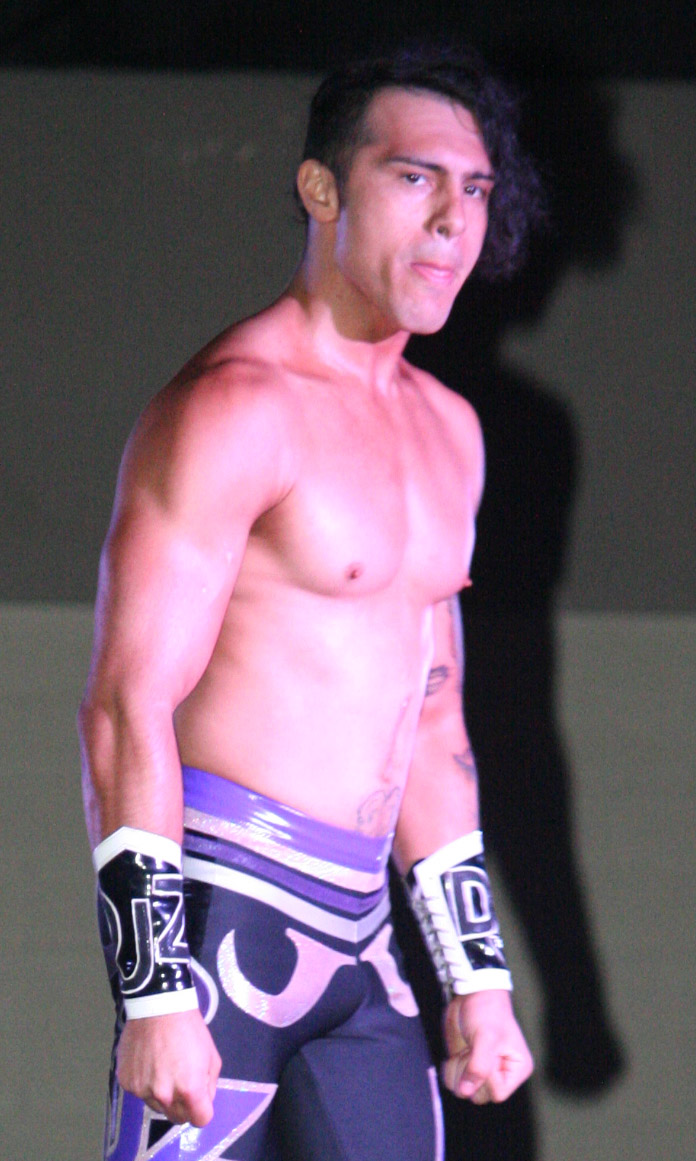
Joaquin Wilde

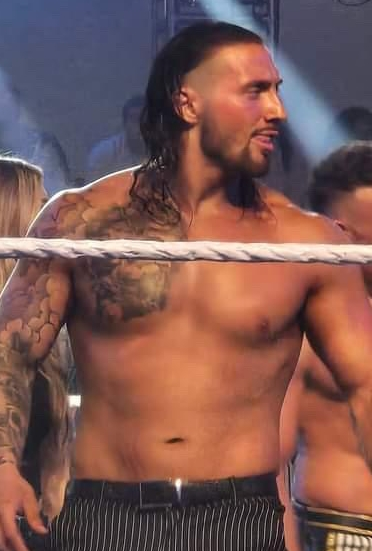
Luca Crusifino

*	Founding member(s)
L	Leader

Members	Joined	Left
Tony D'Angelo* (L)	April 19, 2022	July 15, 2025
Channing "Stacks" Lorenzo*	April 19, 2022	April 19, 2025
Troy "Two Dimes" Donovan*	April 19, 2022	June 28, 2022
Santos Escobar	June 4, 2022	August 16, 2022
Cruz Del Toro	June 4, 2022	August 23, 2022
Elektra Lopez	June 4, 2022	August 23, 2022
Joaquin Wilde	June 4, 2022	August 23, 2022
Adriana Rizzo	November 21, 2023	July 15, 2025
Luca Crusifino	March 5, 2024	July 1, 2025

== Championships and accomplishments ==
- WWE
  - NXT North American Championship (1 time) – D'Angelo
  - NXT Heritage Cup (1 time) – D'Angelo
  - NXT Tag Team Championship (2 times) – D'Angelo and Lorenzo
