= NXT No Mercy (2024) =

WWE premium live event

- Promotional poster featuring Roxanne Perez, Oba Femi, Ethan Page, Jaida Parker, and Trick Williams
- Promotion: WWE
- Brand: NXT
- Date: September 1, 2024
- City: Denver, Colorado
- Venue: Ball Arena
- Attendance: 6,899

WWE event chronology
← Previous; Bash in Berlin	Next → Bad Blood

No Mercy chronology
← Previous; 2023	Next → 2025

NXT major events chronology
← Previous; Heatwave	Next → Halloween Havoc

The 2024 NXT No Mercy was a professional wrestling premium live event (PLE) produced by WWE, held for wrestlers from the promotion's developmental brand, NXT. It was NXT's second annual No Mercy and WWE's 15th overall. The event took place on Sunday, September 1, 2024, at the Ball Arena in Denver, Colorado. A couple of wrestlers from partner promotion Total Nonstop Action Wrestling (TNA) also performed.

Six matches were contested at the event. In the main event, which was an interpromotional match, Ethan Page defeated TNA wrestler Joe Hendry to retain the NXT Championship. In another prominent match, which was the penultimate match, Roxanne Perez defeated Jaida Parker to retain the NXT Women's Championship. The event was also notable for the official WWE debut of former Stardom and Marigold wrestler Giulia.

This was NXT's last PLE to carry the NXT logo as beginning with the following month's Halloween Havoc, all NXT events—with the exception of the 2025 Great American Bash—began to carry the WWE logo until the following year's No Mercy when NXT's PLEs returned to having the NXT logo. This was also the first No Mercy to livestream on Abema in Japan and the final No Mercy to air on Disney+ Hotstar in Indonesia, Binge in Australia, and the standalone WWE Network in most other international markets, as WWE's content in those areas moved to Netflix in January 2025, as well as the last on SonyLIV in India, which moved to Netflix in April 2025.

== Production ==
=== Background ===
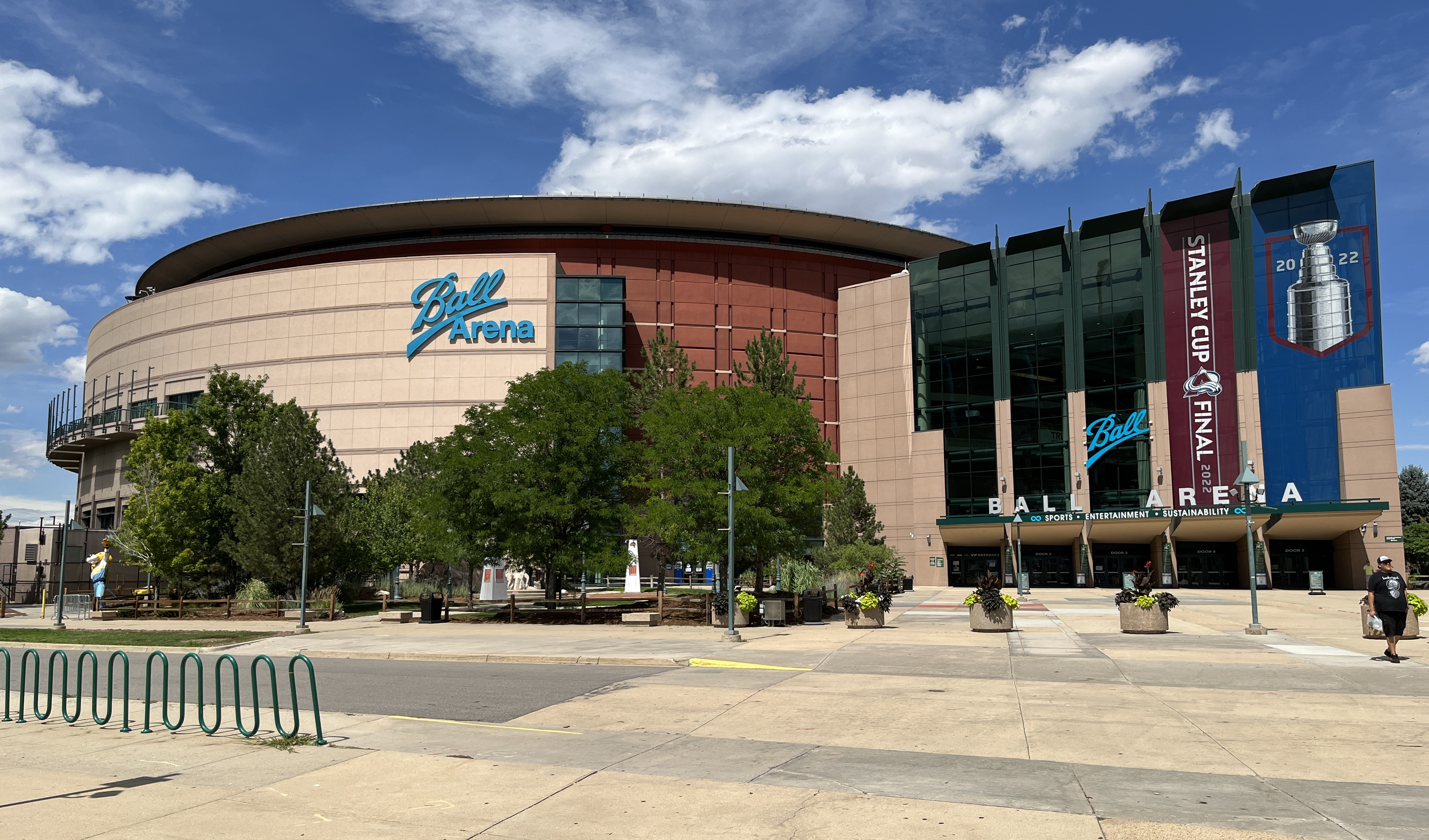
NXT's second annual No Mercy, and WWE's 15th overall, was held at the Ball Arena in Denver, Colorado.

No Mercy was first held by WWE as a United Kingdom-exclusive professional wrestling pay-per-view (PPV) event in May 1999, before it became the promotion's annual October PPV that same year, but held in the United States until 2008. No Mercy was discontinued in 2009, but it was reinstated in October 2016 following the reintroduction of the brand extension, where it also began simulcasting on WWE's livestreaming platforms. No Mercy, however, was discontinued again following its September 2017 edition as WWE ended production of brand-exclusive PPV and livestreaming events for the main roster following WrestleMania 34 in April 2018, resulting in the reduction of these events produced per year. In 2023, WWE again reinstated No Mercy to be held in September as a premium live event (PLE) for its developmental brand, NXT.

On July 9, 2024, it was reported that a second NXT No Mercy, and WWE's 15th overall, would be held on Sunday, September 1, 2024, at the Ball Arena in Denver, Colorado. This report was then confirmed by WWE on July 15, thus establishing No Mercy as an annual September PLE for NXT.

=== Broadcast outlets ===
The PLE was broadcast on WWE's livestreaming platforms. These included Peacock in the United States, SonyLIV in India, Disney+ Hotstar in Indonesia, Disney+ in the Philippines, Binge in Australia, Abema in Japan, and the WWE Network everywhere else. This was the first No Mercy to livestream on Abema after the Japanese version of the WWE Network merged under Abema in October 2023.

Following an announcement made on January 23, this was the final No Mercy to air on the standalone WWE Network in most international markets where it was still available, as well as Disney+ Hotstar and Binge, as its content moved to Netflix in January 2025; a select few territories maintained the standalone WWE Network until early 2026 due to pre-existing contracts before they also merged under Netflix when those contracts expired.

=== Storylines ===
The event comprised six matches that resulted from scripted storylines. Results were predetermined by WWE's writers on the NXT brand, while storylines were produced on WWE's weekly television program, NXT, and the supplementary online streaming show, Level Up.

On the August 13 episode of NXT, the brand's General Manager Ava announced that on the next episode, a No Mercy six-woman Gauntlet Eliminator would be held featuring various women who had never previously challenged for the NXT Women's Championship, with the winner facing Roxanne Perez for the championship at No Mercy. Wren Sinclair, Adriana Rizzo, Sol Ruca, Jaida Parker, Kendal Grey, and Brinley Reece were announced as the six competitors. The match was won by Parker.

On the August 13 episode of NXT, as Ethan Page was celebrating his successful NXT Championship defense from NXT: The Great American Bash – Night 2, he was interrupted by Joe Hendry from Total Nonstop Action Wrestling (TNA), who confronted Page and stated that one of the reasons he was in NXT was to win the NXT Championship. As Hendry stared Page down, Wes Lee appeared and superkicked Hendry. Later in a backstage segment, Raw's Pete Dunne also stated that he wanted the NXT Championship. Later that night, Lee was confronted by Dunne. Hendry then came out and attacked Lee, as security tried to separate them. Later, NXT General Manager Ava announced that Dunne, Hendry, and Lee would face each other in a triple threat match the following week, with the winner challenging Page for the NXT Championship at No Mercy. The match was won by Hendry despite Page attacking two referees in an unsuccessful attempt to prevent Hendry from winning. The following week, Hendry held a special live concert, only to be interrupted by Page. Ava then appeared and announced that a special guest referee had been appointed for the No Mercy title match due to Page's actions during the triple threat match and his disrespect for Hendry. Trick Williams was then revealed as the special guest referee.

On the August 13 episode of NXT, Chase University's Andre Chase and Ridge Holland defeated Axiom and Nathan Frazer to win the NXT Tag Team Championship. The following week, Chase University (Chase, Holland, Duke Hudson, Riley Osborne, and Thea Hail) celebrated their victory, but Axiom and Frazer interrupted and requested a rematch. Hudson said he would consider giving them a rematch if they defeated him and Osborne, which they did. The rematch was subsequently made official for No Mercy.

During NXT: The Great American Bash – Night 2 on August 6, Kelani Jordan defeated Tatum Paxley to retain the NXT Women's North American Championship. Wendy Choo appeared after the match, seemingly to comfort Paxley, only to attack her from behind. The following week, Jordan, who sat ringside for a match between Paxley and Lola Vice, was attacked by Choo from behind, with Choo posing with Jordan's title. Jordan then interfered in Choo's match against Vice the next episode, only for Vice to accidentally strike Jordan. Choo subsequently attacked Vice with a pillow to win the match. Jordan subsequently challenged Choo for the title at No Mercy, which Choo accepted and was later made official.

Throughout July 2024, then-NXT Heritage Cup Champion Tony D'Angelo was interrupted in interviews by NXT North American Champion Oba Femi. On the August 13 episode of NXT, D'Angelo lost the Cup to No Quarter Catch Crew (NQCC) member Charlie Dempsey. The following week, Dempsey and his stablemates Myles Borne and Wren Sinclair celebrated his victory, but were interrupted by Femi, who stated his interest in winning the Cup. D'Angelo subsequently appeared, seemingly to ask Dempsey for a rematch, only to incite a brawl between his D'Angelo Family stablemates Channing "Stacks" Lorenzo, Luca Crusifino, and Adriana Rizzo and the NQCC while staring Femi down. The two subsequently brawled with D'Angelo getting the upper hand. It was later announced that Femi would defend his title against D'Angelo at No Mercy.

At NXT: The Great American Bash – Night 2, Wes Lee attacked fellow Rascalz members Trey Miguel and Zachary Wentz from TNA after he and Wentz failed to win the NXT Tag Team Championship, turning heel for the first time in his career. The following week, Lee addressed why he attacked Miguel and Wentz, saying that Wentz abandoned him and went to TNA. Lee then issued a challenge to Wentz for No Mercy. On the next episode, Lee faced Joe Hendry and Pete Dunne in a triple threat match to determine the #1 contender for the NXT Championship, which Hendry won. After the match, Wentz attacked Lee and both men had to be separated by security as the show went off the air. The following week, they both agreed to a match at No Mercy.

== Event ==
Other on-screen personnel
Role:	Name:
Commentators	Vic Joseph
Commentators	Booker T
Spanish commentators	Marcelo Rodríguez
Spanish commentators	Jerry Soto
Ring announcer	Alicia Taylor
Referees	Adrian Butler
Referees	Chip Danning
Referees	Dallas Irvin
Referees	Derek Sanders
Referees	Trick Williams (NXT Title match)
Interviewers	Blake Howard
Interviewers	Sarah Schreiber
Pre-show panel	Megan Morant
Pre-show panel	Sam Roberts

=== Preliminary matches ===
The PLE began with Chase University (Andre Chase and Ridge Holland, accompanied by Duke Hudson, Riley Osborne, and Thea Hail) defending the NXT Tag Team Championship against Nathan Frazer and Axiom. Near the end of the match, Frazer took out Chase and Holland with a missile dropkick and a suicide dive. After Chase performed a neckbreaker on Axiom, Frazer blind tagged in. Axiom performed a Spanish Fly on Chase followed by a Phoenix Splash by Frazer to win the title. After the match, Holland viciously attacked Chase, Hudson, and Osborne, including performing a DDT on Chase on the announce table.

After that, TNA X Division Champion Zachary Wentz faced Wes Lee in a non-title match. Lee performed a Phoenix Splash and the Cardiac Kick on Wentz, but both resulted in nearfalls. Outside the ring, Wentz send Lee into the steel steps. In the end, as Lee retrieved a steel chair, Trey Miguel took it from him. This allowed Wentz to perform a Canadian Destroyer from the apron and a UFO Cutter on Lee to win the match.

In the third match, Kelani Jordan defended the NXT Women's North American Championship against Wendy Choo. During the match, Jordan performed a Tornado DDT into a split-legged DDT on Choo for a nearfall, after which, Choo mocked The Undertaker's situp. Choo applied a rear naked choke on Jordan, who escaped. Jordan then performed a 450 splash and the One of a Kind Moonsault on Choo to retain the title. After the match, Tatum Paxley knocked out Choo with a Dragon Sleeper.

Next, Oba Femi defended the NXT North American Championship against Tony D'Angelo (accompanied by Channing "Stacks" Lorenzo, Luca Crusifino, and Adriana Rizzo). In the climax, Femi took out Lorenzo and Crusifino when they attempted to introduce a crowbar). After Femi and D'Angelo traded finishers, Femi pinned D'Angelo with Fall from Grace to retain the title.

In the penultimate match, Roxanne Perez defended the NXT Women's Championship against Jaida Parker. In the closing moments, Parker performed a Hip-notic on Perez, who rolled out of the ring. As Parker attempted the same move, Perez sent Parker into the barricade. Perez performed Pop Rox on Parker in the timekeeper's area and the same move back inside the ring to retain the title. After the match, Giulia made her WWE debut and confronted Perez.

Before the main event, NXT General Manager Ava announced that there would be an NXT Championship match at NXT's debut on The CW.

=== Main event ===
In the main event, Ethan Page defended the NXT Championship against Joe Hendry with Trick Williams as the special guest referee. During the match, Hendry performed a Standing Ovation Uranage on Page, who placed his foot on the bottom rope. Page sent Hendry into Williams and performed the Standing Ovation Uranage on Hendry. A second referee came out and Hendry kicked out. Page performed a DDT on Hendry onto the title belt when Williams recovered. Page then punched the other referee and while Williams was distracted by that, Page performed a low blow on Hendry. Page then performed Ego's Edge on Hendry to retain the title. After the match, Pete Dunne pulled Williams out of the ring and performed a Bitter End on Williams.

== Aftermath ==
Trick Williams opened the following episode of NXT to call out Pete Dunne. Instead, NXT Champion Ethan Page appeared and promised to defend the title at NXT''s CW premiere. Dunne and Williams then engaged in a brawl which was broken up by officials. Later that night, Dunne and Williams fought to a double countout, and engaged in another brawl which had to be broken up. As a result, a Last Man Standing match between Dunne and Williams to determine the number one contender for the title was scheduled for the following week, which was won by Williams after he backdropped Page through the announce table. It was also announced that CM Punk would serve as the special guest referee for the match. On The CW premiere, Williams defeated Page to win the title.

Also on NXT, NXT Women's Champion Roxanne Perez talked about her title defense when SmackDown's Chelsea Green interrupted, followed by Giulia, who set up a title match against Perez at NXT's CW premiere. Giulia then defeated Green the following week, but failed to defeat Perez for the title on The CW premiere.

On the September 10 episode of NXT, Wes Lee announced that he would take on Zachary Wentz in a street fight on The CW premiere, which Lee won.

Ridge Holland talked about bringing Chase University back to prominence and vowed a step-by-step destruction of the group starting next week, where he defeated Hudson and attacked him after the match. Holland then defeated Riley Osbourne on the September 24 and October 15 episodes. After the latter, Chase returned to save Osbourne from being taken out by Holland. Chase was then scheduled to face Holland in an ambulance match at Halloween Havoc.

This was NXT's last PLE to carry the NXT logo as beginning with the following month's Halloween Havoc, all NXT events—with the exception of the 2025 Great American Bash—began to carry the WWE logo until the following year's No Mercy when NXT's PLEs returned to having the NXT logo. In addition to the majority of countries moving to Netflix in January 2025, this would also be the final No Mercy to air on SonyLIV in India following the expiration of WWE's contract with SonyLIV with India then moving to Netflix on April 1, 2025.

== Results ==
No.	Results	Stipulations	Times
1	Axiom and Nathan Frazer defeated Chase University (Andre Chase and Ridge Holland) (c) (with Duke Hudson, Riley Osborne, and Thea Hail) by pinfall	Tag team match for the NXT Tag Team Championship	13:33
2	Zachary Wentz defeated Wes Lee by pinfall	Singles match	13:37
3	Kelani Jordan (c) defeated Wendy Choo by pinfall	Singles match for the NXT Women's North American Championship	13:19
4	Oba Femi (c) defeated Tony D'Angelo (with Channing "Stacks" Lorenzo, Luca Crusifino, and Adriana Rizzo) by pinfall	Singles match for the NXT North American Championship	13:47
5	Roxanne Perez (c) defeated Jaida Parker by pinfall	Singles match for the NXT Women's Championship	14:50
6	Ethan Page (c) defeated Joe Hendry by pinfall	Singles match for the NXT Championship; Trick Williams was the special guest referee.	15:08
(c) / – the champion(s) heading into the match
