= Chase University =

Professional wrestling stable

Statistics
- Name(s): Andre Chase University; Chase University; Chase U
- Former members: See below
- Debut: September 21, 2021
- Disbanded: April 24, 2026
- Years active: 2021–2024; 2025–2026

Chase University, formally known as the Andre Chase University and usually shortened as Chase U, was a professional wrestling stable that performed in WWE on the NXT brand. Chase U's gimmick is that of an educational university and has won the NXT Tag Team Championship twice.

== History ==
=== WWE ===
==== First formation (2021–2024) ====
On the September 21, 2021 episode of NXT, Andre Chase debuted a new heel teacher persona and began hosting a segment on the show called Andre Chase University. Over the next few months, Bodhi Hayward and Thea Hail joined the stable, but Hayward was released in November and was replaced by Duke Hudson.

On the January 31, 2023 episode of NXT, Chase U defeated The Dyad (Rip Fowler and Jagger Reid) and Malik Blade and Edris Enofé in a triple threat tag team match to become the fourth team to challenge for the NXT Tag Team Championship at NXT Vengeance Day but were unsuccessful at capturing the titles. Over the next several weeks, Chase U would go into a feud with Schism, which would also involve Tyler Bate, who began to help Chase U against Schism. An eight-person mixed tag team match would be set up for NXT Stand & Deliver, with the control of Chase U on the line. At the event, Chase U defeated Schism. On the June 6 episode of NXT, Hail won a battle royal to become #1 contender for the NXT Women's Championship which she lost at NXT: Gold Rush. Following the loss, which Hail blamed on Chase as he threw in the towel, she began a more rebellious persona where she openly critiqued Chase. After a loss to Jacy Jayne, the two formed a friendship after Jayne advised Hail to be more assertive. This involved Hail acquiring new ring gear and forming a tag team with Jayne, who in turn joined Chase U. On the October 17 episode of NXT, Chase and Hudson won a battle royal to become number one contenders for the NXT Tag Team Championship. At NXT: Halloween Havoc Night 1, Chase and Hudson defeated Tony D'Angelo and Channing "Stacks" Lorenzo to win the NXT Tag Team Championships. At Night 2, Hail and Jayne failed to win WWE Women's Tag Team Championship from Chelsea Green and Piper Niven after Chase refused to allow Jayne to use the title belt against Green. Chase and Hudson lost the titles back to D'Angelo and Stacks on the November 14 episode of NXT, ending their reign at 21 days.

On the December 5 episode of NXT, a new member was introduced as Riley Osborne (previously known as Josh Morrell in NXT UK) who entered the 2023 Men's NXT Breakout Tournament representing Chase U, with Hail in turn developing a storyline where she has a crush on Osborne. Around the same time, Chase U started a storyline where it was revealed that the University was in heavy debt after Chase gambled away all their funds. In the Breakout Tournament, Osborne defeated Keanu Carver and Lexis King but lost to Oba Femi in the finals at NXT: New Year's Evil. On the January 23, 2024 episode of NXT, repo men were seen repossessing material equipment in Chase U, including Hudson's MVP trophy, teasing the disbandment of Chase U. In the following week, Jayne announced that she has created the "2024 Ladies of Chase U" calendar to be launched at NXT Vengeance Day and that the projected sales will save Chase U. Chase thanked Jayne and officially accepted her into the stable. Around the same period, Jayne took on a new protégé, Jazmyn Nyx, a student from Chase U (also part of the Ladies of Chase U Calendar) who would help Jayne win matches by cheating which Hail refused to do. On the March 12 episode of NXT, Hail and Fallon Henley lost a tag team match after Jayne refused to be her partner the previous week. An emotional Hail disavowed her friendship with Jayne and declared she was returning to the "old Thea Hail". On the following week of NXT, Jayne and Nyx turned on Chase U and cost Osborne the NXT Heritage Cup championship match against No Quarter Catch Crew's Drew Gulak. At NXT Stand & Deliver on April 6, Hail teamed up with Henley and Kelani Jordan to defeat Jayne, Kiana James and Izzi Dame in a six-woman tag team match. On the following episode of NXT, Jayn revealed the truth of Chase U's gambling debt. In Hail's NXT Women's Championship match in 2023, Chase placed an illegal bet that Hail will win the title. However, he chose Hail's wellbeing and threw in the towel, resulting in him losing the bet. On the April 16 episode of NXT, Hail lost to Tatum Paxley after interference from Jayne and Nyx. Following this, a match was scheduled for Hail and Jayne during Week 2 of Spring Breakin', which Hail won. However, a dissatisfied Henley turned heel and attacked Hail as she was celebrating.

===== Final storyline and disbandment (2024) =====
On the May 7, 2024 episode of NXT, Hail thanked Ridge Holland for comforting her at Spring Breakin'. Later that night, Hudson lost to Lexis King after Holland attempted to assist Hudson but inadvertently cost him the match. On the following week, Holland challenged The Good Brothers (Luke Gallows and Karl Anderson) to a tag team match when The Good Brothers mocked Holland for leaving the main roster to NXT. Chase offered Osborne to be Holland's tag team partner to Osborne's dissatisfaction. The Good Brothers won the match after another mishap from Holland. On the May 21 episode of NXT, Fallon Henley defeated Hail to qualify for a spot for the six-woman ladder match to crown the inaugural NXT Women's North American Champion at NXT Battleground. Backstage, Osborne got into an argument with Holland for costing Hail the match, to which Chase proposed that both men settle their differences in the ring where Holland defeated Osborne. After the match, Osborne still did not approve of Chase U working with Holland, with Hudson taking Osborne's side. On the June 18 episode of NXT, Holland was accepted as a member of Chase U. Holland entered the 25-man battle royal for an NXT Championship match at NXT Heatwave but he was eliminated by Dragon Lee and Tyler Bate. Later that night, Holland assisted Chase and Hudson to defeat The Good Brothers in a tag team match by giving Hudson leverage from outside the ring as Hudson pinned Anderson. On the following episode of NXT, Chase and Hudson won a tag team turmoil match for a NXT Tag Team Championship title match at NXT Heatwave on July 7 but they failed to defeat Nathan Frazer and Axiom for the titles. After NXT Heatwave, Hail began a short feud with NXT Women's Champion Roxanne Perez, culminating in a title match at Week 1 of NXT: The Great American Bash on July 30 but Hail failed to win the title. Holland went on to secure a rematch for the tag titles, but with Chase teaming with Holland instead. On the August 13 episode of NXT, Chase and Holland defeated Frazer and Axiom to win the titles, making Chase a two-time champion while Holland wins his first championship in WWE. At NXT No Mercy on September 1, Chase and Holland lost the titles back to Frazer and Axiom, ending their reign at 19 days. After the match, Holland viciously attacked the group, defecting from Chase U and reverted back to a heel in the process.

After his defection, Holland vowed to take down Chase U. On the September 10 episode of NXT, Holland defeated Hudson and took him out with the barricade after the match. Two weeks later, Holland defeated Osborne but failed to take him out. On the October 15 episode of NXT, Holland defeated Osborne again. After the match, Chase returned to save Osborne as Holland was about to take him out. At NXT Halloween Havoc on October 27, Holland defeated Chase in an Ambulance match. On the November 19 episode of NXT, Chase faced Holland with the stipulation that Chase U had to disband should Chase lose. Holland won the match, causing Chase U to disband. Hudson and Osborne were subsequently released by WWE in 2025.

==== Second formation (2025–2026) ====
In early 2025, Andre Chase started a storyline with Kale Dixon and Uriah Connors in their attempts to reform Chase U. On the April 22 episode of NXT, Chase officially reformed Chase U. On the May 20 episode of NXT, Dixon and Conners wrestled their first match as a tag team in Chase U's first match since its reformation but lost to the returning OTM (Bronco Nima and Lucien Price). On the June 3 episode of NXT, Chase, Dixon and Conners teamed for the first time, where they lost to DarkState (Cutler James, Dion Lennox, and Osiris Griffin) in a six-man tag team match. On the February 3, 2026 episode of NXT, Conners and Dixon lost to Lexis King and Channing “Stacks” Lorenzo. Conners subsequently defected from Chase U to join King and Lorenzo after the match. On April 24, Chase confirmed he had been released from WWE. This also marks the second disbandment of Chase U.

== Members ==
*	Founding member(s)
L	Leader

=== Former ===
Member	Joined	Left
Andre Chase (L)	September 21, 2021 *	April 24, 2026
Bodhi Hayward	January 4, 2022	November 1, 2022
Thea Hail	May 31, 2022	November 19, 2024
Duke Hudson	November 1, 2022	November 19, 2024
Jacy Jayne	September 5, 2023 (Note: Jayne joined the stable as an associate member on September 5, 2023 before being accepted as an official member by Andre Chase on January 30, 2024.)	March 19, 2024
Riley Osborne	December 5, 2023	November 19, 2024
Jazmyn Nyx	January 16, 2024	March 19, 2024
Ridge Holland	May 14, 2024 (Note: Holland joined the stable as an associate member on May 14, 2024 before being accepted as an official member on June 18, 2024.)	September 1, 2024
Uriah Connors	April 22, 2025	February 3, 2026
Kale Dixon	April 22, 2025	April 24, 2026

== Former students ==
While they are not official members of the stable, WWE Performance Center recruits were used as stand-ins as Chase U students during backstage segments. Notable stand-ins who went on to perform in WWE include Oba Femi, Dion Lennox, Kelani Jordan, Tatum Paxley, Izzi Dame, Adriana Rizzo, Myles Borne, Tyra Mae Steele, Kendal Grey, Lainey Reid, and Wren Sinclair.

Bodhi Hayward, under his real name of Brady Booker, competed on the 51st season of the CBS reality show Survivor. He was voted out in the seventh episode, placing 13th. He forfeited his spot on the jury to receive treatment for an injury he sustained in the second episode.

== Championships and accomplishments ==
- WWE
  - NXT Tag Team Championship (2 times) – Chase and Hudson (1), Chase and Holland (1)
