= Andre Chase =

American professional wrestler (born 1989)

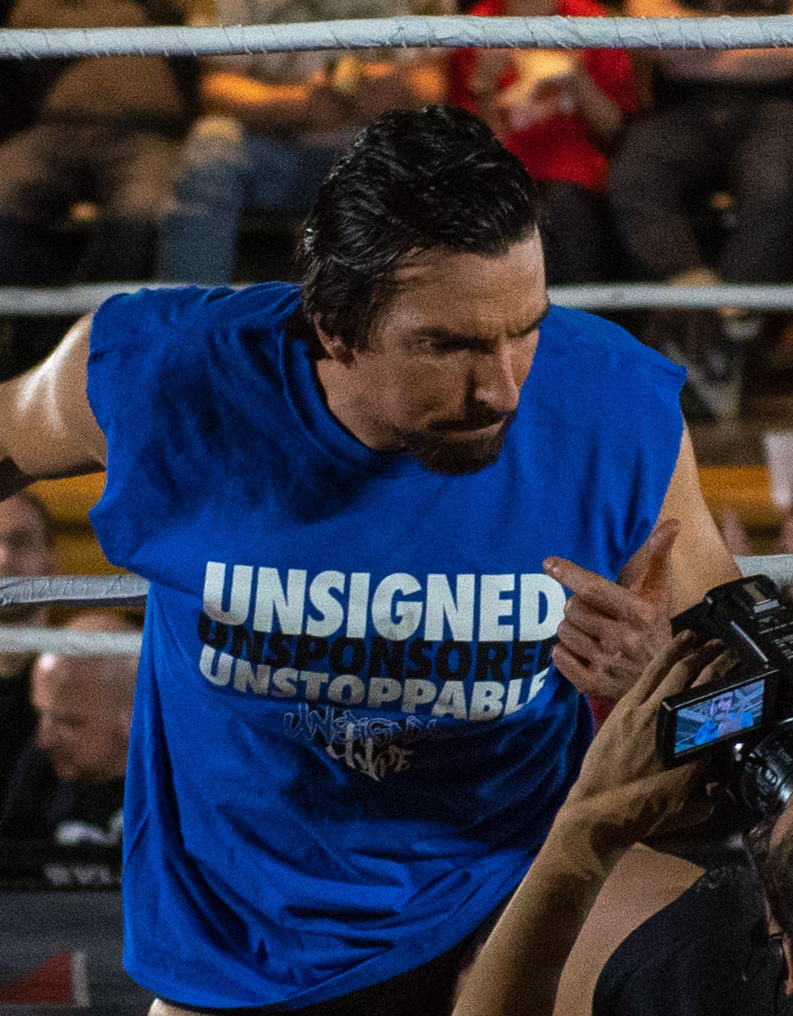
- Chase in March 2019

Personal information
- Born: Chance Barrow; April 22, 1989 (age 37) Eden, North Carolina, U.S.

Professional wrestling career
- Ring name(s): Harlem Bravado; Andre Chase
- Billed height: 6 ft 2 in (1.88 m)
- Billed weight: 222 lb (101 kg)
- Billed from: Draper, North Carolina
- Trained by: Delirious
- Debut: 2008

Chance Barrow (born April 22, 1989) is an American professional wrestler. He currently performs on the independent circuit. He is best known for his tenure in WWE, where he performed for the NXT brand under the ring name Andre Chase. He is a former two-time NXT Tag Team Champion.

Barrow was previously known by the ring name Harlem Bravado where he teamed with his brother Lance Bravado working for Ring of Honor and Pro Wrestling Noah as the Bravado Brothers.

== Professional wrestling career ==
=== Ring of Honor (2008–2012) ===
Barrow and his older brother Houston trained at Ring of Honor (ROH)'s Wrestling Academy under the tutelage of Delirious in 2008.

Barrow debuted for ROH in September 2009 as Harlem Bravado alongside his brother Lance Bravado as The Bravado Brothers, and over the next several months they competed in dark matches, facing wrestlers including Tony Kozina and Anthony Nese. Their first match as part of the main roster was at the 8th Anniversary Show, where they were defeated by The Kings of Wrestling (Chris Hero and Claudio Castagnoli). They entered the Tag Wars 2010 tournament, reaching the semi-finals before losing to the Dark City Fight Club of Kory Chavis and Jon Davis. Following losses to teams including Future Shock (Adam Cole and Kyle O'Reilly) and Grizzly Redwood and Andy Ridge, they developed a winning streak beginning in January 2011, which lasted until they were beaten by Future Shock at Supercard of Honor VI on May 21. At Tag Team Turmoil 2011, the Bravados entered the tournament to determine the next challengers to the ROH World Tag Team Championship. They defeated the Briscoe Brothers (Jay and Mark Briscoe), but lost to Future Shock in the final. On September 17, the Bravado Brothers appeared on their first ROH pay-per-view Death Before Dishonor IX, when they were part of a three-way elimination match against The Young Bucks and Future Shock; the Bravados were the first team eliminated. In November, the duo lost to the Briscoe Brothers in a qualifying match for the Survival of the Fittest tournament. At the Final Battle 2011 pay-per-view, the Bravado Brothers were part of a tag team gauntlet match to determine the number one contenders to the ROH World Tag Team Championship, but were the first team eliminated by Caprice Coleman and Cedric Alexander.

The Bravado Brothers returned to ROH at Unity in April 2012, defeating The Young Bucks. The following month, they challenged Wrestling's Greatest Tag Team (Shelton Benjamin and Charlie Haas) for the ROH World Tag Team Championship. They won the match by disqualification, and so did not win the championship. They competed only sporadically for ROH throughout mid-2012, including a loss to Coleman and Alexander at Glory By Honor XI, which was their last ROH appearance.

=== Independent promotions (2011–2021) ===
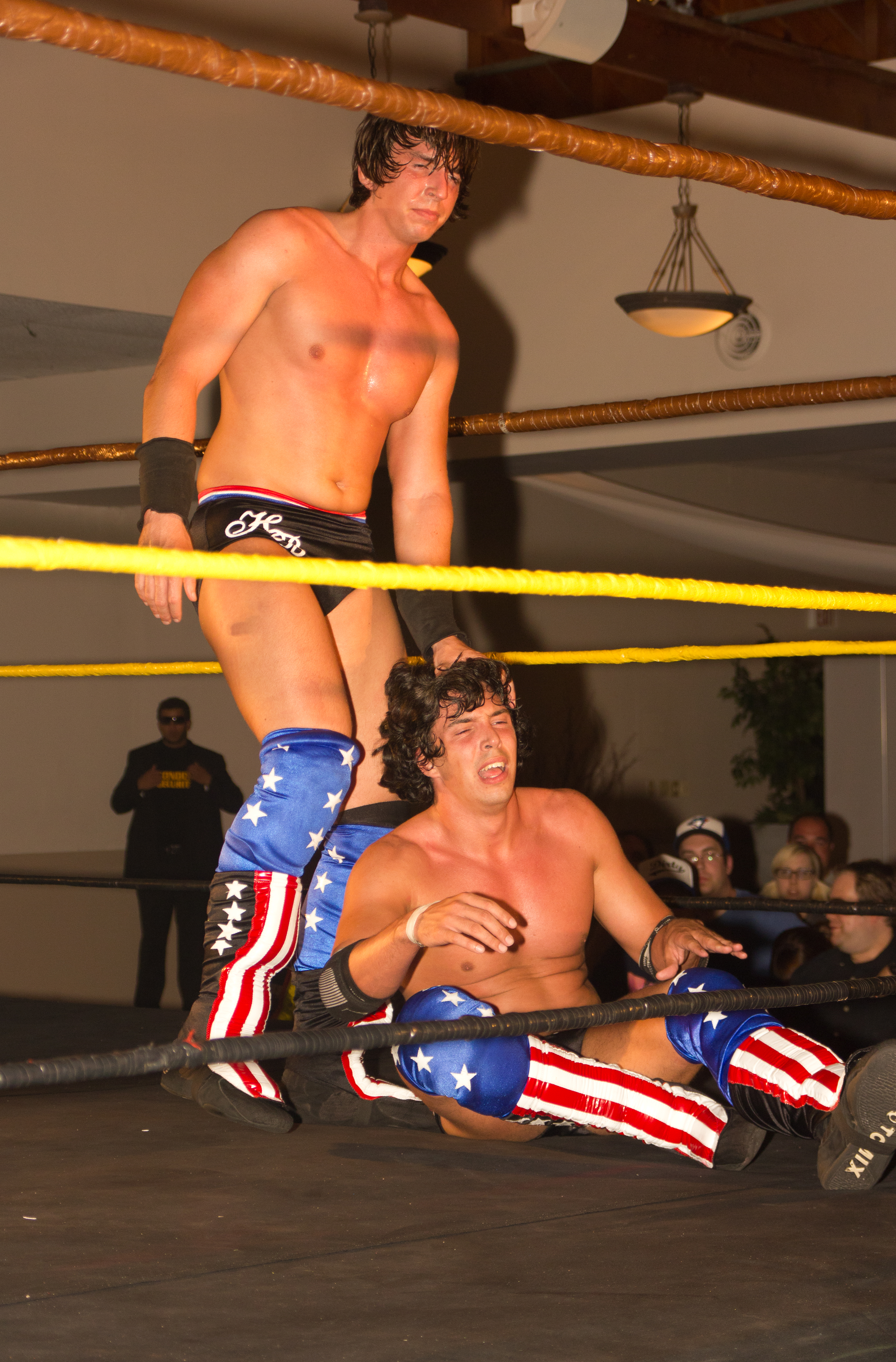
Harlem (standing) and Lance Bravado in the ring at a Chikara show in June 2012

On November 12, 2011, The Bravado Brothers debuted for Chikara, losing to 3.0 (Scott Parker and Shane Matthews). Throughout 2012, they made sporadic appearances for the promotion, including participating in the 2012 torneo cibernetico on November 18, as part of Team Kevin Steen. On May 18, 2013, the Bravados returned to take part in the 2013 Tag World Grand Prix, but were eliminated in the first round by The Batiri (Kodama and Obariyon).

In 2013, Harlem alongside Lance Bravado began working for the Evolve promotion. On May 30, they defeated Maxwell Chicago and Sugar Dunkerton at Evolve 20 and the following day at Evolve 21, they defeated Derek Ryze and Andrew Everett. On June 2, at Evolve 22, they teamed with Everett in a loss to Dos Ben Dejos and Shane Strickland.

On July 5, at the Declaration of Independence internet pay-per-view, Harlem won the FIP Tag Team Championship alongside Lance Bravado in a three-way match against Dos Ben Dejos and KOA (Sugar Dunkerton and Aaron Epic). On November 16, the Bravado Brothers defeated The Young Bucks to win Dragon Gate USA's Open the United Gate Championship. On December 6, they lost the FIP Tag Team Championship to Rich Swann and Roderick Strong. On September 14, 2014, at Evolve 35, The Bravado Brothers lost the Open the United Gate Championship to Anthony Nese and Caleb Konley in a three-way match, also involving A.R. Fox and Rich Swann. In 2017, Lance Bravado retired from wrestling while Harlem Bravado continued to wrestle as a singles wrestler on the independent circuit mainly for Evolve Wrestling before he signed with WWE in 2021.

=== Pro Wrestling Noah (2012–2013) ===
In January 2012 Harlem and his brother Lance Bravado moved to Japan for three months to train with and compete for Pro Wrestling Noah. While at Noah, Harlem mostly competed in singles matches, but also teamed up sporadically with Lance Bravado.

=== Total Nonstop Action Wrestling (2016) ===
In December 2016, Harlem appeared in the special Impact Wrestling episode "Total Nonstop Deletion" alongside Lance Bravado as The Bravado Brothers as entrants in the Tag Team Apocalypto for the TNA World Tag Team Championship.

=== WWE (2021–2026) ===
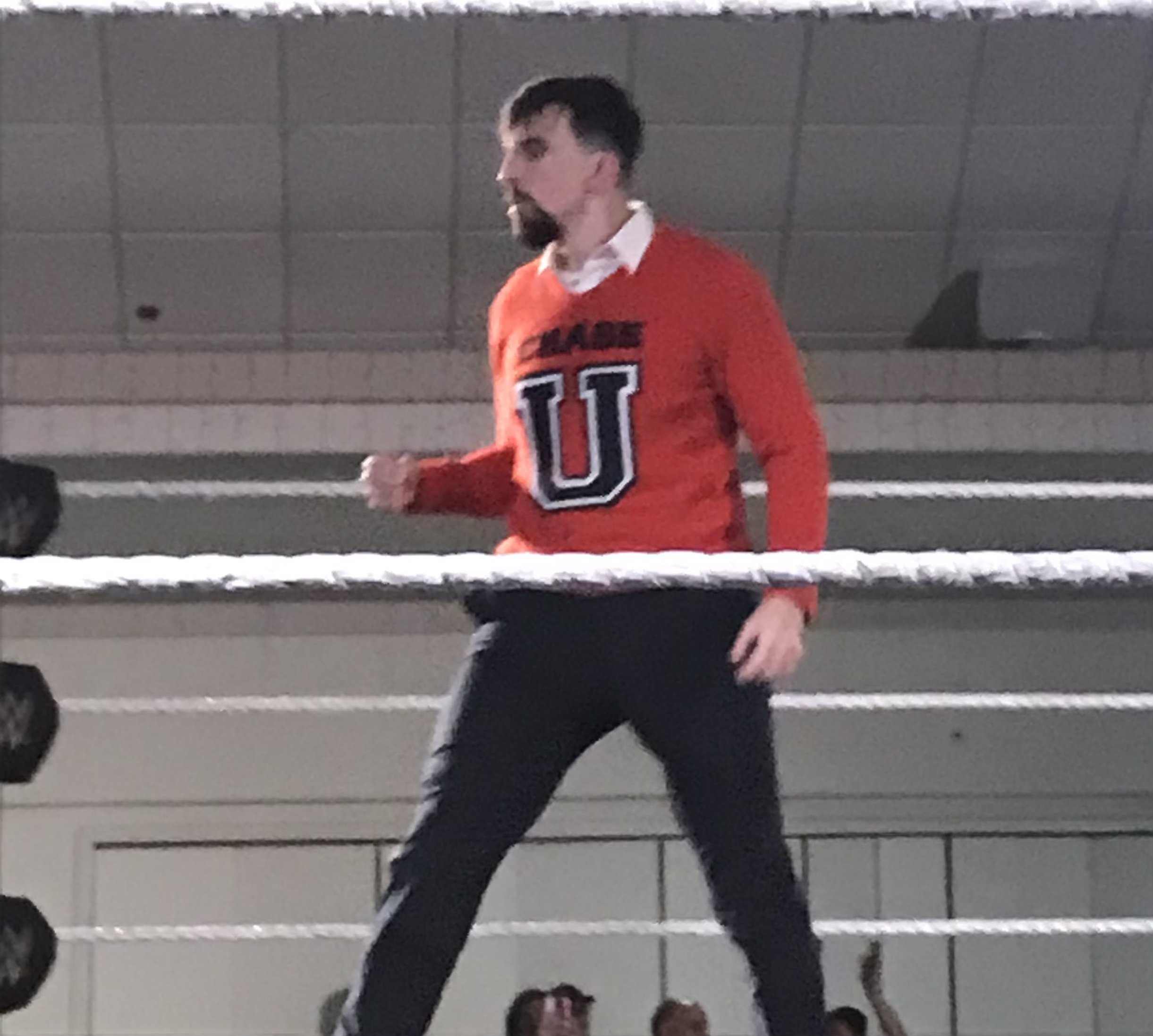
Chase in 2023

In February 2021, it was announced that Harlem Bravado had signed with WWE and would be reporting to the WWE Performance Center. On the July 2 episode of 205 Live, he made his debut under the ring name Andre Chase defeating Guru Raaj to qualify for the NXT Breakout Tournament. On the July 20 episode of NXT, he was defeated by Odyssey Jones in the first round.

==== Chase University (2021–2024) ====
On the September 21 episode of NXT, Chase debuted a new heel teacher persona and began hosting a segment on the show called Andre Chase University. He began feuding with Odyssey Jones after mocking him for losing in the Breakout Tournament and costing him a match against LA Knight. Over the next few months, Chase would recruit Bodhi Hayward and Thea Hail as his new students for Chase University (Chase U) and would slowly turn face. On the September 20, 2022 episode of NXT, Chase and Hayward picked up a victory over Carmelo Hayes and Trick Williams. This earned Chase a NXT North American Championship match qualifier against Von Wagner on the October 4 episode of NXT but he was defeated.

In November, Hayward was released from his WWE contract, thus removing him from Chase U. On the November 1 episode of NXT, Duke Hudson would join Chase U accompanying Andre Chase and Thea Hail as Chase U's flag bearer and would save Chase from an attack by Charlie Dempsey. Chase made his first main roster appearance during the December 19 episode of Raw, where he was seen as one of the wrestlers getting beaten down by The Bloodline backstage. On the January 31 episode of NXT, Chase and Hudson defeated The Dyad and Edris Enofe and Malik Blade to earn a spot in the Fatal 4 Way match for the NXT Tag Team Championship at NXT Vengeance Day. At the event, Chase U were unsuccessful in capturing the titles. On April 25, 2023 at Spring Breakin', Chase lost to Bron Breakker. Following this, Chase would remain off television due to a storyline injury until the June 27 episode of NXT, where he returned to help Hudson fight Drew Gulak and Charlie Dempsey after Thea Hail was defeated by Tiffany Stratton. On October 24 at Night 1 of NXT: Halloween Havoc, Chase and Hudson defeated The Family (Tony D'Angelo and Channing "Stacks" Lorenzo) to become the new NXT Tag Team Champions, winning his first championship in WWE. At Night 2 during Hail's and Jacy Jayne's match against Chelsea Green and Piper Niven for the WWE Women's Tag Team Championship, Chase refused to allow Jayne to use the title belt against Green and costed Hail and Jayne the match. Chase and Hudson then lost the tag titles to D'Angelo and Stacks on the November 14, 2023 edition of NXT, ending their reign at 21 days.

At the end of 2023, Chase U started a storyline where it was revealed that the university was in heavy debt after Chase gambled away all their funds. On the January 23, 2024 episode of NXT, repo men were seen repossessing material equipment in Chase U, including Hudson's MVP trophy, teasing the disbandment of Chase U. In the following week, Jayne announced that she has created the "2024 Ladies of Chase U" calendar to be launched at NXT Vengeance Day and that the projected sales will save Chase U. Chase thanked Jayne and officially accepted her into the stable. In March, Jayne turned on Chase U, which led to a six-woman tag team match at NXT Stand & Deliver on April 6, with Hail teaming up with Fallon Henley and Kelani Jordan to defeat Jayne, Kiana James and Izzi Dame. On the following episode of NXT, Jayn revealed the truth of Chase U's gambling debt. In Hail's NXT Women's Championship match against Tiffany Stratton at NXT The Great American Bash in 2023, Chase placed an illegal bet that Hail will win the title. However, he chose Hail's wellbeing and threw in the towel, resulting in him losing the bet.

In early May 2024, Ridge Holland started associating himself with Chase U. On the May 14 episode of NXT, Holland challenged The Good Brothers (Luke Gallows and Karl Anderson) to a tag team match when The Good Brothers mocked Holland for leaving the main roster to NXT. Chase offered Riley Osborne to be Holland's tag team partner to Osborne's dissatisfaction. The Good Brothers won the match after another mishap from Holland. On the 21 May episode of NXT, Fallon Henley defeated Hail to qualify for a spot at the six-woman ladder match to crown the inaugural NXT Women's North American Championship at NXT Battleground. Backstage, Osborne got into an argument with Holland for costing Hail the match, to which Chase proposed that both men settle their differences in the ring where Holland defeated Osborne. After the match, Osborne still do not approve of Chase U working with Holland, with Hudson agreeing with Osborne. On the 4 June episode of NXT, Osborne and Hudson refused to walk out with Holland for Hail's match against Jazmyn Nyx. Halfway through the match, Osborne and Hudson showed up to ringside to Hail's surprise, to which Nyx used as an advantage to defeat Hail. The stable eventually accept Holland as an official member. On the June 25 episode of NXT, Chase and Hudson won a tag team turmoil match for a NXT Tag Team Championship title match at NXT Heatwave. At the event on July 7, Chase and Hudson failed to defeat Nathan Frazer and Axiom for the titles. Holland secured a rematch for the NXT Tag Team Championship but it will be Chase teaming up with Holland instead. On the August 13 episode of NXT, Chase and Holland defeated Frazer and Axiom for the NXT Tag Team Championship, making Chase a two-time champion while Holland wins his first championship in WWE. Chase and Holland lost the titles back to Frazer and Axiom 19 days later at NXT No Mercy. After the match, Holland attacked the stable, defecting from Chase U and reverted back to a heel in the process. Chase returned on the October 15 episode of NXT to save Osborne from being taken out by Holland after their match. At NXT Halloween Havoc on October 27, Holland defeated Chase in an Ambulance match. On the November 19 episode of NXT, Chase faced Holland with the stipulation that Chase U had to disband should Chase lose. Holland was victorious, causing Chase U to disband and its members to go their separate ways.

==== Second Chase U formation (2024–2026) ====
On the November 26, 2024 episode of NXT, a week after Chase U was disbanded, Chase was seen clearing out his office. As he was walking off, he was called out by someone off-screen. On the December 31 episode of NXT, a dishevelled Chase teamed with Hank Walker and Tank Ledger and faced Wes Lee, Tyriek Igwe and Tyson Dupont in a six-man tag team match in a losing effort. In early 2025, Uriah Connors and Kale Dixon were encouraging Chase to reform Chase U. On the April 15 episode of NXT, Chase reunited with Thea Hail, who gave her blessing for the reformation of Chase U but would like to remain as an alumni. On the April 22 episode of NXT, Chase opened a briefcase with a Chase U hoodie revealing that Chase U is back. On April 24, 2026 Chase was released from his WWE contract.

== Personal life ==
In 2026, Barrow graduated from the University of Florida with a bachelor's degree in sports management.

== Other media ==
=== Video games ===
Video game appearances
Year	Title	Notes
2023	WWE 2K23	Video game debut. Downloadable content
2024	WWE 2K24	
2025	WWE 2K25	
2026	WWE 2K26	

== Championships and accomplishments ==
- All Star Wrestling
  - ASW British Heavyweight Championship (1 time)
- Battle Zone
  - Battle Zone United States Championship (1 time)
- Dragon Gate USA
  - Open the United Gate Championship (1 time) – with Lancelot Bravado
- Full Impact Pro
  - FIP Tag Team Championship (1 time) – with Lancelot Bravado
- Pro Wrestling Illustrated
  - Ranked No. 281 of the top 500 wrestlers in the PWI 500 in 2012
- Premiere Wrestling Xperience
  - PWX Tag Team Championship (2 times) – with Lancelot Bravado
- Wrestle Force
  - Wrestle Force Tag Team Championship (1 time) – with Lancelot Bravado
- WWE
  - NXT Tag Team Championship (2 times) – with Duke Hudson (1) and Ridge Holland (1)
