= Ridge Holland =

English rugby league player and wrestler (born 1988)

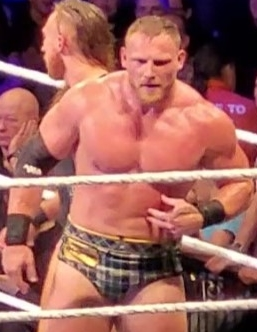
- Holland in 2023
- Born: 29 May 1988 (age 38); Liversedge, West Yorkshire, England
- Professional wrestling career
- Ring name(s): Luke Menzies; Ridge Holland
- Billed height: 6 ft 1 in (1.85 m)
- Billed weight: 260 lb (18 st 8 lb; 120 kg)
- Billed from: Yorkshire, England
- Trained by: Marty Jones
- Debut: 30 September 2017
- Rugby league career

Personal information
- Full name: Luke Menzies

Playing information
- Height: 6 ft 1 in (1.85 m)
- Weight: 251 lb; 17 st 13 lb (114 kg)
- Position: Prop
Club
Years	Team	Pld	T	G	FG	P
2006–07	Batley Bulldogs	22	2	0	0	8
2008	Hull Kingston Rovers	2	0	0	0	0
2008–09	Oldham	27	3	0	0	12
2010–11	Dewsbury Rams	28	4	0	0	16
2012	Batley Bulldogs	5	0	0	0	0
2012–13	Hunslet Hawks	37	0	0	0	0
2014	Swinton Lions	25	4	0	0	16
2015	Salford Red Devils	1	0	0	0	0
2015 (loan)	→ York City Knights	1	0	0	0	0
2015 (loan)	→ Halifax	2	0	0	0	0
	Total	150	13	0	0	52

Luke Menzies (born 29 May 1988) is an English professional wrestler and former rugby league player. He is best known for his tenure in WWE, where he performed under the ring name Ridge Holland from 2018 to 2025 and became a one-time NXT Tag Team Champion alongside Andre Chase.

Menzies spent the majority of his rugby league career with various clubs in the Rugby Football League Championship, making one appearance in the Super League for Hull Kingston Rovers in 2008. He began pursuing a career in professional wrestling in 2016 and signed with WWE in 2018.

== Rugby league career ==
Menzies signed for Hull Kingston Rovers in September 2007, making one appearance in the Super League in 2008. He later appeared for a number of lower league clubs such as Batley Bulldogs, Oldham, Dewsbury Rams, Hunslet, and Swinton Lions. He joined Salford Red Devils in 2014, making one appearance for the club. In 2015, he joined York City Knights on loan. Later that year, he joined Halifax on loan. In 2017, he joined the Toronto Wolfpack for their inaugural season.

== Professional wrestling career ==
=== Independent circuit (2017–2018) ===
Menzies trained as a professional wrestler under Marty Jones, then made his debut on 30 September 2017. He wrestled for promotions such as 3 Count Wrestling, New Generation Wrestling, and Tidal Championship Wrestling. On 11 December 2017, he made an appearance for Defiant Wrestling in a losing effort against Jurn Simmons. On 21 April 2018, he defeated El Ligero, Joseph Conners, and Rampage Brown in a 4-way elimination match to win Brown's 3CW Championship. He lost it back to Brown a month later when he signed a contract with WWE and had to prepare for his relocation to Florida. His final match on the British independent circuit took place on 23 June for Southside Wrestling, where he was defeated by Gabriel Kidd.

=== WWE (2018–2025) ===
==== NXT (2018–2021) ====
Menzies signed with WWE in May 2018, having previously attended a WWE tryout in Scotland in November 2016. He debuted at an NXT live event on 28 July, defeating Mars Wang. On the 29 August episode of NXT, he made his televised debut in a losing effort to Keith Lee. On 21 November 2019, he made his television debut for the NXT UK brand under the ring name Ridge Holland, defeating Oliver Carter.

On 7 August 2020 episode of NXT, Holland made his first appearance for the brand since 2018, taking part in a triple threat match against Oney Lorcan and Damian Priest in which the winner would go on to NXT TakeOver XXX to compete in a ladder match for the vacant NXT North American Championship, which Priest won. Dexter Lumis was soon pulled out of the ladder match at NXT TakeOver XXX due to an ankle injury, and since Holland was not pinned or submitted in his qualifying match as a result of Lorcan being pinned, he was given the chance to face Johnny Gargano on the 19 August episode of NXT with the winner being added to the ladder match; he lost due to interference from Gargano's wife Candice LeRae.

At NXT TakeOver 31 on 4 October, after the main event of Kyle O'Reilly against Finn Bálor for the NXT Championship, he appeared at ringside carrying O'Reilly's unconscious Undisputed Era teammate Adam Cole over his shoulders, having apparently attacked Cole; he dropped Cole over the barricade in front of Bálor and O'Reilly before leaving, establishing himself as a heel. On 7 October episode of NXT, Holland brawled with Oney Lorcan and Danny Burch after defeating Burch in a match; as he caught Lorcan leaping over the top rope to deliver a cross-body, Holland's legs gave out from under him, and he had to be stretchered out of the arena, reportedly suffering an ankle dislocation and fracture in his left leg and a knee patellar dislocation and patellar tendon rupture in his right leg.

After a nine-month absence due to injury, Holland returned on 27 July 2021 episode of NXT, assisting Oney Lorcan and Pete Dunne in defeating Tommaso Ciampa and Timothy Thatcher and subsequently beat both men down post match, teasing an alliance between the three. On 7 September episode of NXT, Holland and Dunne attacked Lorcan and Danny Burch, ending their alliance. On 12 October episode of NXT 2.0, Holland wrestled his final match on NXT until December 2023, where he and Dunne lost to Kyle O'Reilly and Von Wagner.

==== The Brawling Brutes (2021–2023) ====
As part of 2021 Draft, Holland was drafted to the SmackDown brand. On 5 November 2021 episode of SmackDown, during a backstage interview, Holland referred to Sheamus as his idol. On 19 November episode of SmackDown, Holland helped Sheamus defeat Cesaro, Ricochet, and Jinder Mahal in a four-way match, starting an alliance between the two. Holland made his main roster in-ring debut the following week on SmackDown, where he lost to Cesaro, as well as a battle royal to determine the #1 contender for the Universal Championship later that night. A rematch between Holland and Cesaro was set for 17 December episode of SmackDown, which Holland won. On 1 January 2022 at Day 1, Holland and Sheamus defeated Cesaro and Ricochet. During the match, Holland suffered a broken nose and was removed mid-match. On 11 March episode of SmackDown, Holland and Sheamus introduced Dunne, who was subsequently renamed "Butch", as part of their stable. On the same show, a match between the team of Sheamus and Holland and The New Day (Big E and Kofi Kingston) saw Holland delivering an overhead belly-to-belly suplex to Big E at ringside, resulting in Big E accidentally landing on the top of his head; he was placed onto a stretcher and taken to a hospital. On Night 2 of WrestleMania 38 on 3 April, Holland and Sheamus defeated The New Day (Kofi Kingston and Xavier Woods) in a quick match.

Holland and Butch challenged for the Undisputed WWE Tag Team Championship and the NXT Tag Team Championship, but both times lost due to interference from Imperium. This led to a match at Extreme Rules where The Brawling Brutes defeated Imperium in a six-man tag team Good Old Fashioned Donnybrook match. On 5 November at Crown Jewel, Holland and Butch failed to win the Undisputed WWE Tag Team Championship from the Usos. Three weeks later at Survivor Series: WarGames on 26 November, The Brawling Brutes, along with Drew McIntyre and Kevin Owens, lost to The Bloodline in a WarGames match.

On the November 17, 2023 episode of SmackDown, visible dissension appeared between Holland and Butch after a loss to Street Profits. One week later, Holland walked out on Butch during a tag team match against Pretty Deadly, resulting in a loss in what would be their final match as a team.

==== Return to NXT (2023–2025) ====
On 19 December episode of NXT, Holland returned to the NXT brand where he challenged Ilja Dragunov for the NXT Championship. During the match, an angle was created when Dragunov was stretchered off after Holland suplexed him, emulating his incident with Big E. This led to a storyline where, on 26 March 2024 episode of NXT, Holland announced he would be going on an indefinite hiatus from in-ring competition. On 6 April, Holland appeared at the pre-show of NXT Stand & Deliver to attack Joe Gacy with a steel chair as Gacy was making his entrance for his match against Shawn Spears, turning heel for the first time since 2022.

On the 21 May episode of NXT, Fallon Henley defeated Thea Hail to qualify for a spot at the six-woman ladder match to crown the inaugural NXT Women's North American Championship at NXT Battleground. Backstage, Riley Osborne got into an argument with Holland for costing Hail the match, to which Chase proposed that both men settle their differences in the ring where Holland defeated Osborne. After the match, Osborne still did not approve of Chase U working with Holland, with Duke Hudson agreeing with Osborne. On the 18 June episode of NXT, Holland was accepted as a member of Chase U. Holland entered into the 25-man battle royal for a NXT Championship match at NXT Heatwave but he was eliminated. Later that night, Holland assisted Chase and Hudson to defeat The Good Brothers in a tag team match by giving Hudson a leverage from outside the ring as Hudson pinned Karl Anderson. After Chase and Hudson lost an NXT Tag Team Championship match at NXT Heatwave on 7 July, Holland secured a rematch for the titles, but Chase decided to team up with Holland instead. On the 13 August episode of NXT, Chase and Holland defeated Nathan Frazer and Axiom to become the new NXT Tag Team Champions, marking Holland's first championship win in WWE. On 1 September at NXT No Mercy, Chase and Holland lost the titles back to Frazer and Axiom, ending their reign at 19 days. After the match, Holland viciously attacked Chase, defecting from Chase U and cementing his heel turn.

After his defection, Holland vowed to take down Chase U. On the 10 September episode of NXT, Holland took out Hudson with the barricade after defeating him. Two weeks later, Holland defeated Riley but failed to take him out. At NXT Halloween Havoc on October 27, Holland defeated a returning Chase in an Ambulance match. Later that night, Holland attacked Trick Williams after his successful NXT Championship defence against Ethan Page. Bubba Ray Dudley, who had a confrontation with Holland earlier that night, ran into the ring to save Williams from Holland and Page. On the November 19 episode of NXT, Holland faced Chase to earn a shot at the NXT Championship and with the future of Chase U on the line. Holland defeated Chase to earn a title shot against Williams at NXT Deadline and caused Chase U to be disbanded. At the event on December 7, Holland failed to win the title from Williams.

On the July 9, 2025 episode of Evolve, Holland was moved to the Evolve brand. On October 13, Holland announced that WWE would be not be renewing his contract upon its expiration, ending his seven-year tenure with the promotion. However, after taking to social media to state that he "was hung out to dry" after his non-renewal, Holland's contract was terminated early on November 5.

=== Total Nonstop Action Wrestling (2025) ===
On the 18 September 2025 episode of iMPACT!, Holland made his TNA debut, attacking Mike Santana. At Victory Road, Holland would face Santana in a losing effort. Holland's final match would be against Moose during the television tapings in Edmonton, Alberta, on 27 September. The match ended abruptly with a referee stoppage due to Holland receiving a Lisfranc injury to his foot.

== Other media ==
=== Video games ===
Year	Title	Ref.
2023	WWE 2K23	
2024	WWE 2K24	
2025	WWE 2K25	
2026	WWE 2K26	

== Championships and accomplishments ==
- 3 Count Wrestling
  - 3CW Championship (1 time)
- Pro Wrestling Illustrated
  - Ranked No. 291 of the top 500 singles wrestlers in the PWI 500 in 2022
- WWE
  - NXT Tag Team Championship (1 time) – with Andre Chase
