= Rocky statue =

Rocky statue can refer to one of several public statues of fictional boxer Rocky Balboa:

- A statue at the Rocky Steps at the Philadelphia Museum of Art, as seen in the film Rocky III
- A statue at Terminal A West at Philadelphia International Airport
- Statue of Rocky Balboa (Žitište), a statue in Žitište, Serbia
