= Duke Hudson =

Australian professional wrestler (born 1990)

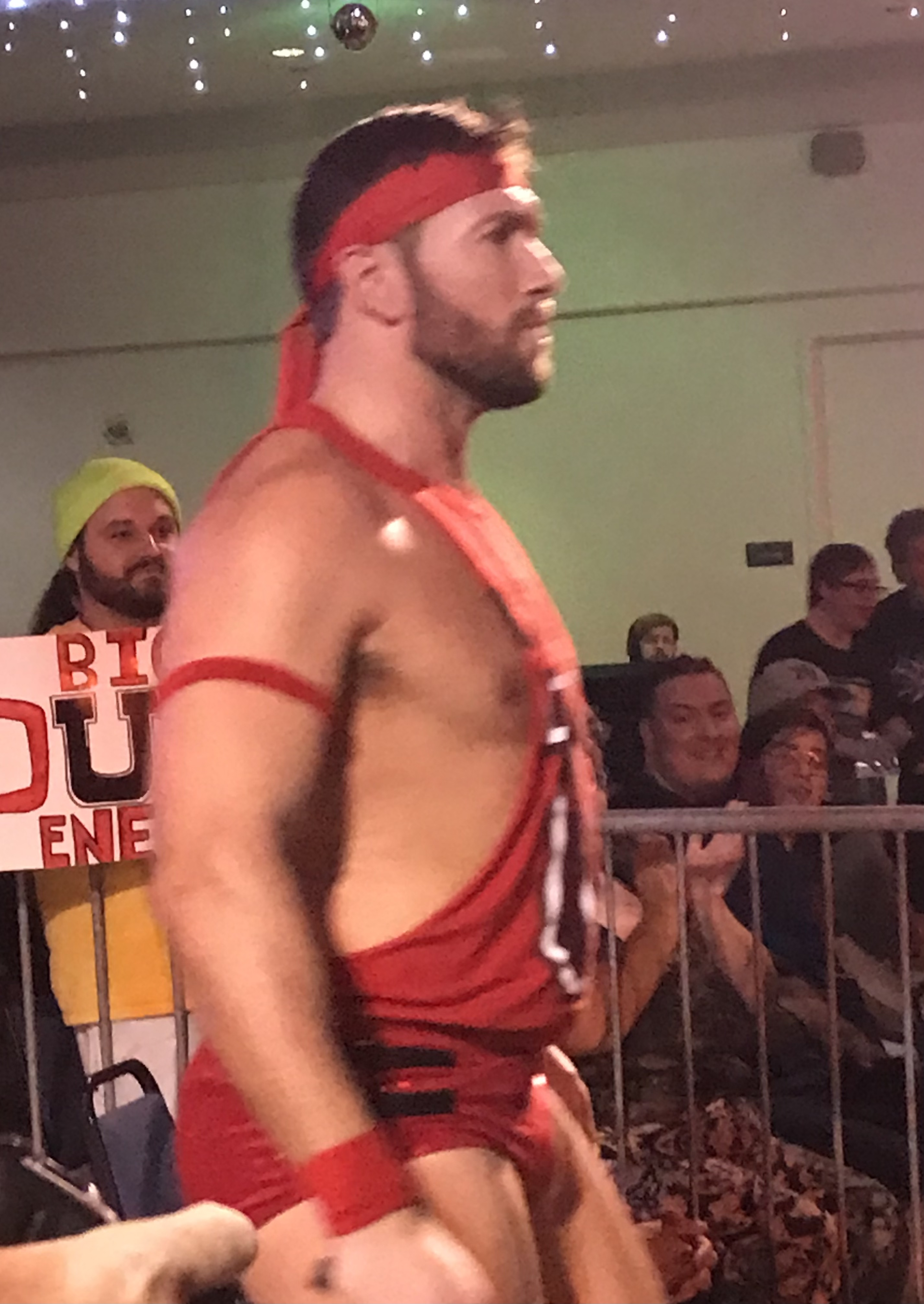
- Hudson in 2023

Personal information
- Born: Brendan Vink; 8 February 1990 (age 36) Adelaide, South Australia, Australia

Professional wrestling career
- Ring name(s): Duke Hanson; Duke Hudson; Elliot Sexton; Tony Modra
- Billed height: 6 ft 5 in (196 cm)
- Billed weight: 270 lb (122 kg)
- Billed from: Adelaide, South Australia
- Trained by: Damian Slater; Hartley Jackson
- Debut: 28 April 2006

Brendan Vink (born 8 February 1990) is an Australian professional wrestler currently performing in the independent circuit under the ring name Duke Hanson. He is best known for his tenure in WWE, where he performed under the ring name Duke Hudson and is a former one-time NXT Tag Team Champion. He is also known for his time in Melbourne City Wrestling (MCW).

== Professional wrestling career ==
=== Independent circuit (2006–2019) ===
Brendan Vink made his professional wrestling debut on 28 April 2006 under the ring name Elliot Sexton. Wrestling primarily in Australia, Sexton appeared in independent promotions including Melbourne City Wrestling (MCW) and Wrestle Rampage. During his time in both promotions, Sexton became a one-time MCW Heavyweight Champion and a one-time WrestleRock Champion. In 2018, he made his international debut in matches for the Japanese promotion New Japan Pro-Wrestling (NJPW) and the British promotion Progress Wrestling and Reality of Wrestling.

=== WWE (2019–2025) ===
==== Raw and NXT debut (2019–2022) ====
On 11 February 2019, it was announced that Vink had signed a contract with WWE and that he would report to the WWE Performance Center. Vink debuted under his real name at an NXT house show on 15 March 2019, defeating Nick Comoroto. He went on to spend the remainder of March and the following month of April wrestling on house shows. Vink made his televised debut on the 25 March 2020 episode of NXT, teaming with his former TMDK stablemate Shane Thorne in a losing effort against Oney Lorcan and Danny Burch.

Vink made his debut for EVOLVE in 2019 as part of EVOLVE's business relationship with WWE at EVOLVE 141 where he defeated Colby Corino in his first singles match. Vink would then go on a winning streak in EVOLVE, defeating the likes of A. R. Fox, Stephen Wolf, JD Drake and Leon Ruff.

In March 2020, Vink began appearing on Raw alongside Shane Thorne where they faced teams such as the Street Profits and Cedric Alexander and Ricochet but were defeated. On the April 27 episode of Raw, Thorne and Vink became MVP’s newest associates as he challenged Alexander and Ricochet to a match the next week on their behalf. On the May 4 episode of Raw, Thorne and Vink defeated Alexander and Ricochet earning their first victory. However, their alliance with MVP ended after they were both traded back to NXT and Thorne and Vink would quietly disband as a team soon after.

In July 2021, Vink, under the new ring name Duke Hudson was announced to be a part of the 2021 NXT Breakout Tournament. On the 13 July episode of NXT, Hudson defeated Ikemen Jiro in the first round. On the 17 August episode of NXT, Hudson was eliminated in the semi-finals by Carmelo Hayes. Hudson would then confront Kyle O'Reilly and a brawl would ensue leading to a match being made between the two on next weeks episode of NXT. On 5 December, at NXT WarGames, Hudson lost to Cameron Grimes in a Hair vs. Hair match, and therefore had to shave his hair per the match's stipulation.

==== Chase University (2022–2025) ====
On 1 November 2022 episode of NXT, Hudson accompanied Thea Hail and Andre Chase as Chase University's flag bearer, thus turning face. On 24 October 2023 on Night 1 of NXT: Halloween Havoc, Hudson and Chase defeated The Family (Tony D'Angelo and Channing "Stacks" Lorenzo) to become the NXT Tag Team Champions, winning his first championship in WWE. Chase and Hudson later lost the titles to D'Angelo and Stacks on the 14 November edition of NXT, ending their reign at 21 days.

In early May 2024, Ridge Holland started associating himself with Chase U. On the 21 May episode of NXT, Fallon Henley defeated Hail to qualify for a spot at the six-woman ladder match to crown the inaugural NXT Women's North American Championship at NXT Battleground. Backstage, Riley Osborne got into an argument with Holland for costing Hail the match, to which Chase proposed that both men settle their differences in the ring where Holland defeated Osborne. After the match, Osborne still do not approve of Chase U working with Holland, with Hudson agreeing with Osborne. The stable would eventually accept Holland as an official member. On the 25 June episode of NXT, Chase and Hudson won a tag team turmoil match for a NXT Tag Team Championship title match at NXT Heatwave on 7 July but they failed to defeat Nathan Frazer and Axiom for the titles. On the 17 July episode of NXT, Hudson failed to defeat Oba Femi for the NXT North American Championship after Holland arranged for the match the previous week. At NXT No Mercy on September 1, Chase and Holland, who had defeated Frazer and Axiom for the NXT Tag Team Championship two weeks before, lost the titles back to Frazer and Axiom. After the match, Holland viciously attacked the group, defecting from Chase U and reverted back to a heel in the process. After his defection, Holland vowed to take down Chase U. On the September 10 episode of NXT, Holland defeated Hudson and took out Hudson with the barricade after the match in what would be Hudson's final televised match for WWE. On the November 19 episode of NXT, Holland defeated Chase with the future of Chase U on the line, causing Chase U to disband. Hudson was released by WWE in January 2025.

=== Return to the independent circuit (2025–present) ===
Vink wrestled his first match after his departure from WWE at ROW Pay Up! on 12 April 2025 under the ring name Duke Hanson.

== Other media ==
Duke Hudson made his video game debut as a playable character in WWE 2K24.

== Championships and accomplishments ==
- Australian Wrestling Allstars
  - AWA Heavyweight Championship (1 time)
  - AWA Championship Tournament (2016)
- Melbourne City Wrestling
  - MCW Heavyweight Championship (1 time)
- Pro Wrestling Illustrated
  - Ranked No. 306 of the top 500 singles wrestlers in the PWI 500 in 2024
- WrestleRock
  - WrestleRock Championship (1 time)
- WWE
  - NXT Tag Team Championship (1 time) – with Andre Chase

== Luchas de Apuestas record ==
Winner (wager)	Loser (wager)	Location	Event	Date	Notes
Cameron Grimes (hair)	Duke Hudson (hair)	Orlando, Florida	NXT WarGames	December 5, 2021	
