= Adriana Rizzo =

American professional wrestler

Personal information
- Born: Anna Jade Keefer; December 26, 1998 (age 27) Albertville, Minnesota, U.S.

Professional wrestling career
- Ring name: Adriana Rizzo
- Billed height: 5 ft 5 in (1.65 m)
- Billed weight: 120 lb (54 kg)
- Billed from: Albertville, Minnesota
- Trained by: WWE Performance Center
- Debut: October 28, 2022

Anna Jade Keefer (born December 26, 1998) is an American professional wrestler. She is best known for her time in WWE, where she performed under the ring name Adriana Rizzo.

== Early life ==
Anna Jade Keefer was born on December 26, 1998 in St. Michael Albertville, Minnesota. Keefer attended the University of North Carolina at Chapel Hill majoring in media productions and interdisciplinary studies. She also competed in track and field as part of the UNC track and field team and was a five-time NCAA All-American.

== Professional wrestling career ==
=== WWE (2022–2026) ===
In 2022, Keefer was announced as part of WWE's Performance Center Fall Rookie Class. She made her in-ring debut in a battle royal at an NXT live event on October 28. After being sidelined for almost a year due to an Achilles tendon rupture, Keefer made her in-ring return at a live event on October 27, 2023, participating in a battle royal.

In November, Keefer began appearing alongside Tony D'Angelo and Channing "Stacks" Lorenzo as a member of The D'Angelo Family, an Italian American mobster group. She was later assigned the ring name Adriana Rizzo and she made her televised in-ring debut in an NXT Women's Championship number one contender's battle royal, which was won by Roxanne Perez. The D'Angelo Family feuded with Scrypts, Bronco Nima, Lucien Price and Jaida Parker of OTM (Out The Mud), leading to a six-person tag team match at NXT Vengeance Day, which The D'Angelo Family won. On the February 13 episode of NXT, Rizzo was defeated by Parker in her first televised singles match, ending the feud. On the August 20 episode of NXT, Rizzo competed in a six-woman gauntlet match to determine the number one contender for Roxanne Perez's NXT Women's Championship at No Mercy, where she was eliminated by Sol Ruca.

On August 10, 2025, Rizzo announced that she had torn her anterior cruciate ligament and meniscus. On the July 8, 2026, episode of Evolve, Rizzo returned from injury as a ringside interviewer. On September 4, Rizzo was released from her contract by WWE.
