= Channing "Stacks" Lorenzo =

American professional wrestler (born 1997)

Personal information
- Born: Mitchell LaValley; March 3, 1997 (age 29) Raleigh, North Carolina, U.S.

Professional wrestling career
- Ring name(s): Channing Lauren; Channing Lorenzo; Channing "Stacks" Lorenzo; Jake Tucker; Mitchell Lyons; Stacks
- Billed height: 6 ft 0 in (183 cm)
- Billed weight: 206 lb (93 kg)
- Billed from: Albany, New York
- Trained by: Kane; Tom Prichard; WWE Performance Center
- Debut: August 24, 2019

Mitchell LaValley (born March 3, 1997) is an American professional wrestler. As of March 2022, he is signed to WWE where he performs on the NXT brand under the ring name Channing "Stacks" Lorenzo and is a member of the BirthRight stable.

In WWE, Lorenzo is a former two-time NXT Tag Team Champion alongside Tony D'Angelo and a former one-time and final NXT Heritage Cup Champion. He also made appearances in WWE's partner promotion Total Nonstop Action Wrestling (TNA), where he is a former one-time TNA International Champion.

== Professional wrestling career ==
=== Early career (2014–2019) ===
In 2014, LaValley won WWE's Show Us Your Superstar contest when he was 17, making a series of videos at the WWE Performance Center before appearing on the SummerSlam pre-show panel. LaValley was trained by Glenn Jacobs and Tom Prichard's Jacobs-Prichard Wrestling Academy in July 2018. LaValley, under the ring name Jake Tucker, made his professional wrestling debut on August 24, 2019 by defeating Sean Stephens. LaValley made an appearance in WWE on the December 2 episode of Raw as an enhancement talent, going under the ring name Mitchell Lyons and teaming with Mark Sterling to lose against The Viking Raiders (Erik and Ivar).

=== All Elite Wrestling (2021) ===
LaValley, under the ring name Jake Tucker, appeared for All Elite Wrestling (AEW) on the June 15, 2021 episode of Dark, losing to Frankie Kazarian. He also wrestled on the July 14 episode of Dark, losing to The Blade.

=== WWE (2022–present) ===
==== The D'Angelo Family (2022–2025) ====
On March 17, 2022, LaValley signed a developmental contract with WWE and was assigned to the WWE Performance Center. LaValley, going under the ring name Channing "Stacks" Lorenzo, made his debut on April 19 episode of NXT alongside Troy "Two Dimes" Donovan, attacking Santos Escobar during a match. The following week on NXT, Tony D'Angelo, with the gimmick of an Italian-American mobster and the leader of The D'Angelo Family stable, introduced them as his henchmen, establishing themselves as heels in the process. On June 4, at NXT In Your House, The D'Angelo Family defeated Legado Del Fantasma and as per the stipulation, Legado Del Fantasma had to join The D'Angelo Family. After Donovan's firing on the August 2 episode of NXT, Lorenzo and D'Angelo faced Creed Brothers for the NXT Tag Team Championship, but were defeated due to Escobar turning on D'Angelo.

At NXT Stand & Deliver, on April 1, 2023, Lorenzo and D'Angelo, turning face, failed to win the NXT Tag Team Championship in a triple threat match. At NXT: The Great American Bash, Lorenzo and D'Angelo defeated Gallus (Wolfgang and Mark Coffey) to win the NXT Tag Team Championship, marking the first championship in LaValley's career. At NXT: Halloween Havoc, on October 24, they lost the titles to Chase University (Andre Chase and Duke Hudson). They regained the titles on the November 14 episode of NXT from Chase University.

On the February 13, 2024 episode of NXT, Stacks and D'Angelo lost the titles to Bron Breakker and Baron Corbin. On the April 16 episode of NXT, D'Angelo revealed that his Family were hired by No Quarter Catch Crew to (kayfabe) eliminate their leader Drew Gulak. D'Angelo demanded payment for the job but NQCC refused, causing a brawl between the two factions and resulting in a six-man tag team match between the two factions at Week 1 of Spring Breakin', which was won by The D'Angelo Family.

==== Singles competition (2025–2026) ====
At NXT Stand & Deliver on April 19, 2025, during the six-man tag team match between The D'Angelo Family against DarkState (Dion Lennox, Saquon Shugars, and Osiris Griffin), Lorenzo turned on D'Angelo after months of D'Angelo distrusting him, turning heel in the process. At NXT Battleground on May 25, Lorenzo defeated D’Angelo despite interference from Luca Crusifino. On the June 24 episode of NXT, Stacks defeated D'Angelo 2—1 in British Rounds Rules to win the vacant NXT Heritage Cup, the first singles championship in his career. At NXT The Great American Bash on July 12, D'Angelo stole and tossed the NXT Heritage Cup off a bridge. During this time, the title remained active on WWE's website, but on June 3, 2026, WWE updated the website and retired the title, with July 12, 2025 recognized as the end date, officially ending Lorenzo's reign at 344 days (17 days as recognized by WWE). On the October 21 episode of NXT, Lorenzo challenged Total Nonstop Action's (TNA) Leon Slater for the TNA X Division Championship but failed to win the title

==== BirthRight (2026–present) ====
In early 2026, Lexis King formed a new faction consisting of second generation WWE wrestlers called BirthRight and recruited Lorenzo and Arianna Grace (as the fiancé of Grace and the daughter of Santino Marella, respectively), Uriah Connors (son of Fit Finlay), and Charlie Dempsey (son of William Regal). At the NXT Stand & Deliver's Countdown Show on April 4, BirthRight teamed together for the first time where they lost to Hank and Tank, Shiloh Hill, EK Prosper, and Wren Sinclair in a 10-person mixed tag team match.

=== Total Nonstop Action Wrestling (2025–2026) ===
At Final Resolution on December 5, 2025, Lorenzo defeated Steve Maclin to win the TNA International Championship. At Genesis, accompanied by his fiancé Arianna Grace, he defeated Eric Young, BDE, and KJ Orso in a four-way match to retain the TNA International Championship, only to lose it to Trey Miguel a month later at No Surrender, in Miguel's Feast of Fired match for the championship.

== Personal life ==
LaValley is a 2019 graduate of NC State University, holding a bachelor's degree in mechanical engineering.

== Championships and accomplishments ==
- Pro Wrestling Illustrated
  - Ranked No. 180 of the top singles wrestlers in the PWI 500 in 2026
- Total Nonstop Action Wrestling
  - TNA International Championship (1 time)
- WWE
  - NXT Heritage Cup (1 time, final)
  - NXT Tag Team Championship (2 times) – with Tony D'Angelo
