= Luca Crusifino =

American professional wrestler (born 2000)

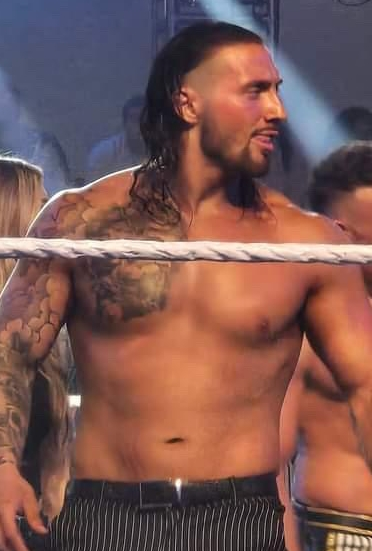
- Crusifino in 2024

Personal information
- Born: Roman Macek; November 16, 2000 (age 25) McKees Rocks, Pennsylvania, U.S.
- Education: Duquesne University

Professional wrestling career
- Ring name: Luca Crusifino
- Billed height: 6 ft 2 in (188 cm)
- Billed weight: 246 lb (112 kg)
- Billed from: Pittsburgh, Pennsylvania
- Trained by: Chris LeRusso; WWE Performance Center
- Debut: February 21, 2023
- Retired: April 27, 2026

Roman Macek (born November 16, 2000) is an American retired professional wrestler and former American football player. He is best known for his tenure in WWE under the ring name Luca Crusifino.

== Early life and football career ==
Macek was born in McKees Rocks, Pennsylvania. He is of Italian and Moroccan descent, by his own account. He attended Montour High School in McKees Rocks, where he played football. He was a first team all-Northwest Nine Conference pick on both the offensive and defensive lines for two-straight years. He also participated as four-year letterman and three-year captain for the wrestling team.

After graduating from high school, Macek went on to study at Duquesne University, majoring in sociology. While attending Duquesne, Macek played football for the Duquesne Dukes. As a freshman in 2017, he played special teams and defense; in 2018, he appeared in all 13 games for the Dukes; in 2019 he moved to offense as a left guard; In 2020–2021 season, he started all five games at left guard for the Dukes in first season on the offensive line and played major role in success of Dukes’ offense. In 2021, he started all 10 games at left guard for the Dukes and was a part of an offensive front which paced the NEC and ranked 17th in the FCS in fewest sacks allowed per game (1.2). After graduating with a B.A. from Duquesne University, Macek continued his education at Duquesne, enrolling in the law school. However, he took a leave of absence to pursue professional wrestling. Macek is still enrolled in law school at Duquesne.

== Professional wrestling career ==
=== WWE (2022–2026) ===
On April 6, 2022, it was reported that Macek had signed with WWE after undergoing a tryout at the WWE Performance Center. He was later assigned the name Luca Crusifino and the gimmick of a lawyer. In early 2023 before his debut, Crusifino made his own website called crusifinolaw.com for his gimmick of a lawyer. In January 2024, Crusifino participated in the NXT men's breakout tournament, but was defeated by Tavion Heights in the first round. On February 27, Crusifino faced Dijak in a losing effort.

Crusifino later joined The D'Angelo Family stable, where he used the gimmick of consigliere of the stabe. Crusifino worked both on NXT and the Evolve brand. During the feud between Tony D'Angelo and Lorenzo, Crusifino allied with Lorenzo, helping him at NXT Battleground to defeat D'Angelo. However, he was kicked out of the stable after Crusifino cost D'Angelo the NXT Heritage Cup match against Lorenzo.

In March 2026, Crusifino introduced a new gimmick on Evolve, but he was released by WWE on April 24 and announced his retirement days later.
