= NXT Deadline (2025) =

WWE premium live event

- Promotional poster featuring Je'Von Evans, Trick Williams, Sol Ruca, Blake Monroe, and Ricky Saints
- Promotion: WWE
- Brand: NXT
- Date: December 6, 2025
- City: San Antonio, Texas
- Venue: Boeing Center at Tech Port

WWE event chronology
← Previous; Survivor Series: WarGames	Next → Saturday Night's Main Event XLII

NXT Deadline chronology
← Previous; 2024	Next → Final

NXT major events chronology
← Previous; Halloween Havoc	Next → Vengeance Day

The 2025 NXT Deadline (stylized as DEADL1NE), also promoted as NXT Deadline: San Antonio, was a professional wrestling premium live event (PLE) produced by WWE, held for wrestlers from the promotion's developmental brand, NXT. It was the fourth annual and final Deadline and took place on Saturday, December 6, 2025, at the Boeing Center at Tech Port in San Antonio, Texas. The event was based around the Iron Survivor Challenge for both the men and women, a 25-minute five-person match in which a wrestler attempts to score the most falls before the deadline in order to win and earn a match for the NXT Championship and NXT Women's Championship, respectively, at NXT: New Year's Evil.

Five matches were contested at the event. While primarily held for NXT, the event also featured wrestlers from WWE's sister promotion Lucha Libre AAA Worldwide (AAA) and partner promotion Total Nonstop Action Wrestling (TNA). The main event was the men's Iron Survivor Challenge, which was won by Je'Von Evans, while the winner of the women's Iron Survivor Challenge was Kendal Grey. In another prominent match, Oba Femi defeated Ricky Saints to win the NXT Championship in the opening bout. The event also featured the first WWE PLE match of former TNA wrestler Joe Hendry after signing with WWE, and the return of Tony D'Angelo after a five-month hiatus.

This event marked the first Deadline event to livestream on Netflix in most international markets following the WWE Network's merger under the service in January 2025 in those effected areas, and it would also be the last on the WWE Network in any country as the last few countries that were still on the service due to pre-existing contracts merged under Netflix on April 1, 2026. This was also WWE's final PLE to air on Disney+ in the Philippines, as well as the final Deadline to air on Abema in Japan, before they too merged under Netflix on January 1 and October 1, 2026, respectively, as well as the final Deadline to air on Peacock in the United States, as The CW acquired the rights to broadcast NXT's PLEs in April 2026, and then that August, all of NXT's programming also began simulcasting on ESPN Unlimited.

== Production ==
=== Background ===
The fourth annual Deadline was held at the Boeing Center at Tech Port in San Antonio, Texas.

Deadline is an annual professional wrestling premium live event (PLE) held in December by WWE for its developmental brand, NXT, since 2022. The event is based around the Iron Survivor Challenge for both the men and women, which is a five-person match in which a wrestler attempts to score the most falls before the 25-minute time limit (the "deadline") expires to earn a future match for the NXT Championship and NXT Women's Championship, respectively, at NXT: New Year's Evil.

On October 25, 2025, at Halloween Havoc, WWE announced that the fourth Deadline would be held on Saturday, December 6, 2025, at the Boeing Center at Tech Port in San Antonio, Texas. The event was in turn promoted as NXT Deadline: San Antonio.

=== Broadcast outlets ===
The PLE was broadcast on WWE's livestreaming platforms. These included Peacock in the United States, Disney+ in the Philippines, SuperSport in Sub-Saharan Africa, Abema in Japan, Netflix in most other international markets, and the WWE Network in a select few countries that had not yet transferred to Netflix due to pre-existing contracts. This marked the first Deadline to livestream on Netflix following the WWE Network's merger under the service in January 2025 in those areas.

=== Storylines ===
The event included five matches that resulted from scripted storylines. Results were predetermined by WWE's writers on the NXT brand, while storylines were produced on WWE's weekly television program, NXT.

During NXT: Gold Rush – Night 1 on November 18, NXT General Manager Ava announced that John Cena would select the participants for the men's and women's Iron Survivor Challenges. The following week, Cena revealed the participants for both bouts. For the women's match, Cena announced Sol Ruca, Lola Vice, Kelani Jordan, Jordynne Grace, and WWE Evolve Women's Champion Kendal Grey as the participants. For the men's match, Cena selected Je'Von Evans, Joe Hendry, Dion Lennox, and TNA X Division Champion Leon Slater from partner promotion Total Nonstop Action Wrestling (TNA) as the first four competitors. The final position was determined in a qualifying match later that evening, where Myles Borne defeated Trick Williams to secure the spot. On the December 2 episode of NXT, Evans, Slater, Hendry, and Borne defeated DarkState (Lennox, Cutler James, Osiris Griffin, and Saquon Shugars) in an eight-man tag team match, where had DarkState won, Lennox would have earned the right to choose his entry position. Since they lost, the wrestler who secured the pinfall earned the right to select his entry position; Borne got the pinfall victory for his team.

At No Mercy on September 27, Ricky Saints defeated Oba Femi to capture the NXT Championship, ending Femi's reign at 264 days. Femi subsequently took a month-long hiatus from television, returning on the November 11 episode of NXT to confront Saints after the latter had successfully retained the title against Trick Williams in a Last Man Standing match. At NXT: Gold Rush – Night 1 on November 18, Femi formally challenged Saints, asserting his intent to reclaim the title. During the exchange, Saints offered Femi a title rematch at Deadline, which Femi accepted. The match was later finalized during a formal contract signing moderated by NXT General Manager Ava, who announced that the NXT Championship match would serve as the opening bout of an NXT PLE event for the first time. The stakes for the match were further heightened on the December 5 episode of SmackDown, where Undisputed WWE Champion Cody Rhodes informed both competitors that the winner at Deadline would face him at Saturday Night's Main Event XLII. This arrangement followed a request from Cena, who envisioned his final event to feature exhibition matches pitting main roster wrestlers against those from NXT.

On November 18 at NXT: Gold Rush – Night 1, Tatum Paxley defended the NXT Women's Championship in a Halloween Havoc rematch against Jacy Jayne, where Paxley's Culling stablemates Shawn Spears, Niko Vance, and Izzi Dame interfered. While Spears and Vance prevented Paxley from returning to the ring while the referee was distracted by Jayne grabbing the title, Dame attacked Paxley at ringside, effectively kicking Paxley out of The Culling. This betrayal allowed Jayne to capitalize and pin Paxley to reclaim the NXT Women's Championship. On the December 2 episode of NXT, Dame addressed the betrayal, asserting that she had corrected a mistake by removing Paxley from the group and that Paxley could never be her equal. Dame characterized her actions as a necessary consequence of Paxley's perceived selfishness and stubbornness, ultimately challenging her former partner to a match at Deadline. Paxley responded via a pre-recorded video segment, appearing visibly distraught while acknowledging her apprehension about competing solo for the first time. Despite her reservations, Paxley accepted the challenge, vowing to avenge the loss of her title and the betrayal by her former stablemates.

In August, NXT North American Champion Ethan Page formed an alliance with Chelsea Green, which included a victory over Tyra Mae Steele and Tavion Heights at Heatwave. Leveraging their momentum, Green challenged La Hiedra and Mr. Iguana from sister promotion Lucha Libre AAA Worldwide (AAA) for the AAA World Mixed Tag Team Championship "Alianzas" on November 2; Page and Green successfully captured the title, ending Hiedra and Iguana's reign at 329 days. On November 22, Page and Green successfully defended the title against Lola Vice and Iguana after Page hit Iguana with a kendo stick while the referee was incapacitated. On the December 2 episode of NXT, Page confronted NXT General Manager Ava, expressing frustration over not being selected by John Cena for the men's Iron Survivor Challenge. Ava noted that the NXT North American Championship had not been defended since Halloween Havoc and informed Page that she had secured a challenger for Deadline. Mr. Iguana appeared, surprising Page by stealing his vehicle. Following the segment, a match between Page and Iguana for the NXT North American Championship was made official for Deadline.

== Event ==
Other on-screen personnel
Role:	Name:
Commentators	Vic Joseph
Commentators	Booker T
Spanish commentators	Marcelo Rodríguez
Spanish commentators	Jerry Soto
Ring announcer	Mike Rome
Referees	Adrian Butler
Referees	Victoria D'Errico
Referees	Chip Danning
Referees	Dallas Irvin
Referees	Derek Sanders
Referees	Felix Fernandez
Interviewers	Sarah Schreiber
Interviewers	Kelly Kincaid
Interviewers	Blake Howard
Pre-show panel	Megan Morant
Pre-show panel	Sam Roberts

=== Preliminary matches ===
The opening match saw Ricky Saints defend the NXT Championship against Oba Femi. As they battled on the outside of the ring, Saints hit a tornado DDT off the barricade, jumping off the elevated platform onto Femi before while swinging around to drop his head down. He then attempted another tornado DDT for a near-fall. Femi reversed a subsequent attack by Saints into the "Fall From Grace", in which he flung Saints up into the air before catching and slamming him down, for a near-fall. He then hit another "Fall From Grace" for the pinfall victory to win the NXT Championship. Femi also earned the right to fight the Undisputed WWE Champion Cody Rhodes in a non-title match at Saturday Night's Main Event XLII.

The second match was the women's Iron Survivor Challenge, where two wrestlers began the match and the remaining wrestlers entering every five minutes with the aim to score the most falls via pinfall, submission, or be the victim of a disqualification by the end of the 25-minute time limit with the loser of every fall forced to be suspended in the penalty box for 90 seconds. WWE Evolve Women's Champion Kendal Grey and Kelani Jordan were the first two entrants. Grey dodged Kelani's dive before hitting her with a powerslam, in which Grey slammed her as Grey fell face-down on top of her, to get her first fall. Jordynne Grace was the third entrant, and Jordan later pinned Grey for her first fall. Lola Vice entered fourth and pinned Grey for her first fall. Grey executed a roll-up on Grace, in which Grey backwards rolled Grace sit on Grace's legs, for her second fall. After leaving the penalty box, Grace pinned Jordan for her first fall. Sol Ruca was the final entrant, who later hit Vice and Jordan with a double "Sol Snatcher", in which flipped 360° off the ropes before grabbing and forcing their heads down, to score two falls. As Grey tried to pin Grace, Jordan landed a diving splash, diving off the top rope. She then pinned Grace for her second fall. Grace then hit Jordan with a "Blue Thunder Bomb", in which Grace lifted and spun Jordan around before slamming her down, for her second fall. Vice then pinned Grey for a five-way tie with two minutes left. Grey later hit Vice with the "Shades of Grey", reaching Vice's torso before falling backward to drive Vice into the mat face-first. Grey then scored the pinfall as the time expired to become the 2026 women's Iron Survivor Challenge winner.

The third match featured Ethan Page defending the NXT North American Championship against Mr. Iguana from Lucha Libre AAA Worldwide. Page threw Iguana off the top rope before hitting him with the "Twisted Grin", in which Page fell backward to drive Iguana into the mat face-first, to get the pinfall victory and retain the title.

Next, former The Culling stablemates Tatum Paxley and Izzi Dame, who was accompanied by Shawn Spears and Niko Vance, battled. Paxley hit Dame with the "Cemetery Drop" on the announce table, using her left arm and legs to hook Dame's arms and legs before falling sideways to slam Dame. Spears then handed Paxley with dolls to calm her down, but Spears broke one of the dolls' head. Tatum then slapped spears. Dame kicked Paxley's head and hit the "Sky High", in which Dame lifted up Paxley before slamming her down back-first while dropping to a seated position, to win the match via pinfall.

=== Main event ===
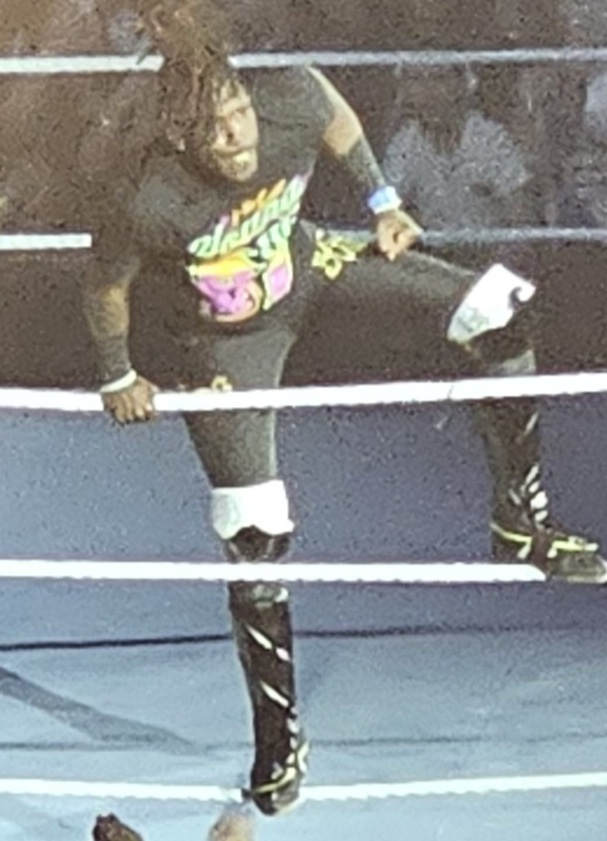
2025 men's Iron Survivor Challenge winner Je'Von Evans

The main event was the men's Iron Survivor Challenge. Total Nonstop Action Wrestling's Leon Slater and Je'Von Evans began the match, and then Evans scored his first fall after executing a "Frankendriver" on Slater, jumping up to Slater's shoulders before forcing him to flip forwards to drive his head into the mat. Myles Borne then entered third, and Dion Lennox entered fourth. Lennox hit Evans with a clothesline, in which Lennox charged at Evans with his extended arm hitting Evans' neck, to score his first fall. Joe Hendry entered last, who then hit Borne with a Death Valley driver, in which Hendry threw Borne off his shoulders to drive his head into the mat, to score his first pinfall. Slater later hit Hendry with the "Swanton 450°", in which Slater dove off the top rope with his arms outstretched before doing a front somersault with 1.5 rotations, to get his first fall via pinfall. Borne caused a five-way tie after hitting Lennox with the "Borne Again", leaping up to grab Lennox's head and pull it backwards. Evans then got the final fall after a roll-up to Borne to win the men's Iron Survivor Challenge.

Immediately following the match, the new NXT Champion Oba Femi appeared on stage to stare down Evans. The standoff was interrupted by a video package and the return of Tony D'Angelo. He attacked Evans and then stared down Femi as the show ended.

== Reception ==
On January 22, 2026, Brandon Thurston of Wrestlenomics reported on viewership data released in Netflix's biannual "What We Watched" engagement report. Deadline generated approximately 200,000 global views, according to performance tracking from July 1 to December 31, 2025. Netflix defines this metric as the total hours viewed divided by the program's runtime, a figure that represents the average number of accounts that watched the event in its entirety. Thurston noted that events held in late December had a statistical disadvantage compared to earlier events in 2025, as it had significantly less time to accumulate "on-demand" viewing hours before the December 31 cutoff. Despite these factors, the event's performance was consistent with other NXT events on the platform, which typically ranged between 100,000 and 300,000 views.

Professional ratings
Publication	Matches					Overall	Ref
Publication	1	2	3	4	5	Overall	Ref
411Mania	B	B	B–	B–	B	8.5/10	
Bleacher Report	B	B	B	C	A–	B	
Nerdly	3.5/5	3.5/5	3/5	3/5	3.5/5	3.5/5	
Pro Wrestling Dot Net	—N/a	—N/a	—N/a	—N/a	—N/a	B	
Súper Luchas	7/10 stars	8.5/10 stars	5/10 stars	6.1/10 stars	9/10 stars	—N/a	
TJR Wrestling	3.75/5 stars	4/5 stars	2.75/5 stars	3/5 stars	4/5 stars	8.0/10	
Wrestling Observer Newsletter	4/5 stars	4.5/5 stars	3/5 stars	2.5/5 stars	4.25/5 stars	—N/a	
Zona Wrestling	7.5/10 stars	8/10 stars	7./10 stars	7/10 stars	8/10 stars	7.5/10 stars	
Match order: 1. Ricky Saints (c) vs. Oba Femi for the NXT Championship; 2. Women's Iron Survivor Challenge: Jordynne Grace vs. Kelani Jordan vs. Kendal Grey vs. Lola Vice vs. Sol Ruca; 3. Ethan Page (c) vs. Mr. Iguana for the NXT North American Championship; 4. Izzi Dame vs. Tatum Paxley; 5. Men's Iron Survivor Challenge: Dion Lennox vs. Je'Von Evans vs. Joe Hendry vs. Leon Slater vs. Myles Borne

Graham Matthews of WrestleRant remarked that Deadline continues to establish itself as one of the best annual NXT events on the calendar. Though Thomas Hall of 411Mania felt that none of the matches quite reached "all-timer" status, he praised the event for successfully pushing new stars and commended the Iron Survivor Challenge as "one of the best fresh concepts". John Canton of TJR Wrestling called the show the "second-best NXT PLE of the year", highlighting how effectively it showcased NXT's youth movement. Chris Mueller of Bleacher Report singled out both Iron Survivor Challenges alongside the NXT Championship match as the standouts of the event. John Moore of Pro Wrestling Dot Net thought that Tony D'Angelo's return made the show meaningful and elevated his overall grade of the event to a B; however, Moore criticized NXT's underdeveloped storylines and characters.

Hall lauded Oba Femi as the "biggest and most dominant star" in his NXT Championship match against Ricky Saints. Matthews enjoyed this match more than their previous encounter at No Mercy, calling it a "strong start to the show". Mueller observed that the contest began as a "walk in the park for Femi" before evolving into a "hard-fought contest" that ultimately surpassed their prior match. Matthews described Femi's victory as a "genuine shocker", while Phil Wheat of Nerdly hailed the win as the night's "headline moment". Canton called it a "great match" but admitted he predicted the wrong outcome due to the short length of Saints' reign and his belief that Femi was already ready for the main roster. Moore expressed surprise at the finish as well, explaining that he expected Saints to turn heel to set up a non-title match with Cody Rhodes. Moore concluded that Femi reclaiming the title felt pointless since the star seemed bound for the main roster.

Lorenzo Fanti of Zona Wrestling noted that the women's Iron Survivor Challenge did not disappoint in delivering a "high-level match". Matthews stated he had yet to be disappointed by the Iron Survivor Challenge. Mueller noted that all the competitors made an "unconventional" format work, adding that it would be difficult to select a standout. Moore characterized the contest as "fun [and] clean", contrasting it favorably with the "messy and ugly" King of the Mountain matches. Hall remarked that women's Iron Survivor Challenge winner Kendal Grey "checks a lot of boxes at once". Canton further lauded the winner, declaring that "she's got it all". Mueller described Grey as being "miles ahead of many of her peers" and possessing the potential to become a top star on the main roster. Moore concluded by praising Grey as a "future star", calling her victory both "surprising" and pleasant.

Moore characterized the NXT North American Championship match as a "fun little dinner break buffer match". However, Matthews criticized the lack of buildup, noting that because the match was hastily put together, the outcome felt entirely predictable. Hall also took issue with the believability of a "glorified comedy wrestler" like Mr. Iguana being a threat to end Ethan Page's "rather impressive" reign.

Fanti noted that he enjoyed the Tatum Paxley and Izzi Dame's intensity and technical wrestling. Canton praised Dame and Paxley for successfully making the story-heavy match work. Conversely, Mueller was critical of the heavy focus on the story at the expense of in-ring action. Matthews called it the best-told story of the night despite it showcasing the weakest in-ring wrestling of the event and suffering from a slow pace. Hall described the contest as being "more about the emotions and the storytelling than anything else". Moore panned the match for having "bad melodrama" and singling out Paxley crying over dolls as the worst moment of the bout.

Hall called the men's Iron Survivor Challenge an "action packed match" and noted that Je'Von Evans' win properly followed up on him falling short the previous year. Mueller remarked that the result of the competitive bout was "genuinely hard" to predict. Moore considered the match "solid", though he noted it was less creative than previous editions. Canton enjoyed the match equally to the women's iteration, observing that the excitement of a buzzer-beater finish reminded him of how Trick Williams won a previous edition. Canton defended the match's fast pace against potential criticisms of a lack of selling by arguing that the pacing was good and not "too unrealistic". Matthews deemed the women's match to be the superior of the two, but he still praised the men's match for its "excellent" action. Matthews particularly commended the decision to have Evans and Leon Slater start the match together following their match-of-the-year contender at Total Nonstop Action Wrestling's Bound for Glory.

== Aftermath ==
In continuing WWE's near worldwide transition to Netflix, this would be WWE's final PLE to air on Disney+ in the Philippines before moving to Netflix on January 1, 2026. Additionally, on October 31, 2026, during Halloween Havoc, WWE announced the return of TLC: Tables, Ladders & Chairs as an NXT premium live event set for December 12. As a result, Deadline was not held in 2026, and while it is unknown if the event will in the future, it was reported that there had been internal discussion to bring the Iron Survivor Challenge to the main roster.

=== NXT ===
During a segment on the following episode of NXT, NXT North American Champion Ethan Page discussed his future title defenses before Tony D'Angelo appeared and attacked the champion. D'Angelo remained silent in the weeks following his return.

By winning the men's Iron Survivor Challenge, Je'Von Evans earned the right to challenge for the NXT Championship at NXT: New Year's Evil. However, on the December 9 episode of NXT, Evans confronted the NXT Champion Oba Femi and requested to invoke his title opportunity immediately. Femi highlighted that Evans had never defeated him in previous encounters before accepting the proposal for a match later that evening. In the main event, Femi defended the NXT Championship against Evans. The challenger nearly secured the title, but Ricky Saints interfered by pulling the referee out of the ring to break the pinfall attempt, turning heel in the process. Evans neutralized Saints with a dive to the floor, and then Femi executed the "Fall From Grace", lifting Evans up to his shoulders before slamming him down, to retain the title. The victory marked Femi's third consecutive win over Evans.

By winning the women's Iron Survivor Challenge, WWE Evolve Women's Champion Kendal Grey earned the right to challenge Jacy Jayne for the NXT Women's Championship at NXT: New Year's Evil. At the event on January 6, 2026, Jayne, accompanied by her Fatal Influence stablemates Lainey Reid and WWE Women's Speed Champion Fallon Henley, defended the title against Grey, who was accompanied by Wren Sinclair. Reid and Henley tried to assist Jayne, resulting in Grey neutralizing Reid and Sinclair neutralizing Henley. However, as Grey attempted an attack, Henley held onto Jayne's attire to prevent Grey's attempt. Jayne then hit the "Rolling Encore", in which Jayne spun around before connecting with a swinging hook to the head, to retain the championship.

=== Saturday Night's Main Event XLII ===
Following his victory over Ricky Saints to win the NXT Championship, Oba Femi secured the right to face Undisputed WWE Champion Cody Rhodes in a non-title Champion vs. Champion match at Saturday Night's Main Event XLII. On the December 12, 2025, episode of SmackDown, Femi confronted Rhodes, asserting that "the future is now" and dismissing Rhodes' focus on his rival Drew McIntyre. Rhodes responded by citing his title victory over John Cena as evidence of his veteran status. At Saturday Night's Main Event XLII on December 13, their match ended in a no contest after McIntyre attacked Rhodes. After Femi pulled McIntyre away, McIntyre berated Femi, who then shoved him to the mat. Rhodes and Femi then worked together to neutralize McIntyre before showing mutual respect by returning each other's championship belts and raising each other's hands.

== Results ==
No.	Results	Stipulations	Times
1	Oba Femi defeated Ricky Saints (c) by pinfall	Singles match for the NXT Championship; Since Femi won, he faced Cody Rhodes at Saturday Night's Main Event XLII.	17:17
2	Kendal Grey (3) defeated Sol Ruca (2), Lola Vice (2), Kelani Jordan (2), and Jordynne Grace (2)	Women's Iron Survivor Challenge for an NXT Women's Championship match at NXT: New Years' Evil	25:00
3	Ethan Page (c) defeated Mr. Iguana by pinfall	Singles match for the NXT North American Championship	8:33
4	Izzi Dame (with Niko Vance and Shawn Spears) defeated Tatum Paxley by pinfall	Singles match	12:36
5	Je'Von Evans (2) defeated Leon Slater (1), Joe Hendry (1), Dion Lennox (1), and Myles Borne (1)	Men's Iron Survivor Challenge for an NXT Championship match at NXT: New Years' Evil	25:00
(c) / – the champion(s) heading into the match

=== Women's Iron Survivor Challenge statistics ===
- Entry Order: Kelani Jordan, Kendal Grey, Jordynne Grace, Lola Vice, and Sol Ruca

Women's Iron Survivor Challenge statistics
Score					Point winner	Fall loser	Decision	Notes	Time
Jordan	Ruca	Grace	Vice	Grey	Point winner	Fall loser	Decision	Notes	Time
0	0	0	0	1	Kendal Grey	Kelani Jordan	Pinfall	Pinned after a powerslam	4:57
1	0	0	0	1	Kelani Jordan	Kendal Grey	Pinfall	Pinned with a roll-up	7:17
1	0	0	1	1	Lola Vice	Kendal Grey	Pinfall	Pinned after a spinning backfist	10:30
1	0	0	1	2	Kendal Grey	Jordynne Grace	Pinfall	Pinned after a cutter	12:27
1	0	1	1	2	Jordynne Grace	Kelani Jordan	Pinfall	Pinned with a roll-up	14:58
1	1	1	1	2	Sol Ruca	Kelani Jordan	Pinfall	Pinned after a double "Sol Snatcher"	18:24
1	2	1	1	2	Sol Ruca	Lola Vice	Pinfall	Pinned after a double "Sol Snatcher"	18:26
2	2	1	1	2	Kelani Jordan	Jordynne Grace	Pinfall	Pinned after a diving splash	20:58
2	2	2	1	2	Jordynne Grace	Kelani Jordan	Pinfall	Pinned after a spinning backbreaker drop	22:55
2	2	2	2	2	Lola Vice	Kendal Grey	Pinfall	Pinned after a kick	23:04
2	2	2	2	3	Kendal Grey	Lola Vice	Pinfall	Pinned after the "Shades of Grey"	25:00
Winner					Kendal Grey	—N/a			25:00

=== Men's Iron Survivor Challenge statistics ===
- Entry Order: Leon Slater, Je'Von Evans, Myles Borne, Dion Lennox, and Joe Hendry

Men's Iron Survivor Challenge statistics
Score					Point winner	Fall loser	Decision	Notes	Time
Evans	Slater	Hendry	Lennox	Borne	Point winner	Fall loser	Decision	Notes	Time
1	0	0	0	0	Je'Von Evans	Leon Slater	Pinfall	Pinned after a hurricanrana	4:44
1	0	0	1	0	Dion Lennox	Je'Von Evans	Pinfall	Pinned after an "Air Raid Crash"	12:40
1	0	1	1	0	Joe Hendry	Myles Borne	Pinfall	Pinned after a spinning fireman's carry slam	17:40
1	1	1	1	0	Leon Slater	Joe Hendry	Pinfall	Pinned after the "Swanton 450°"	20:12
1	1	1	1	1	Myles Borne	Dion Lennox	Pinfall	Pinned after the "Borne Again"	21:11
2	1	1	1	1	Je'Von Evans	Myles Borne	Pinfall	Pinned with a small package	25:00
Winner					Je'Von Evans	—N/a			25:00
