= NXT Halloween Havoc (2025) =

WWE premium live event

- Promotional poster featuring Jacy Jayne, Oba Femi, Ricky Saints, Blake Monroe, and Trick Williams
- Promotion: WWE
- Brand: NXT
- Date: October 25, 2025
- City: Prescott Valley, Arizona
- Venue: Findlay Toyota Center
- Attendance: 2,667

WWE event chronology
← Previous; Crown Jewel	Next → Saturday Night's Main Event XLI

Halloween Havoc chronology
← Previous; 2024	Next → 2026

NXT major events chronology
← Previous; No Mercy	Next → Deadline

The 2025 NXT Halloween Havoc was a professional wrestling premium live event (PLE) produced by WWE, held for wrestlers from the promotion's developmental brand, NXT. It was WWE's sixth annual NXT Halloween Havoc and the 18th Halloween Havoc overall. It took place on Saturday, October 25, 2025, at the Findlay Toyota Center in Prescott Valley, Arizona.

Six matches were contested at the event. While primarily held for NXT, the event also featured wrestlers from WWE's sister promotion Lucha Libre AAA Worldwide (AAA) and partner promotion Total Nonstop Action Wrestling (TNA). In the main event, Ricky Saints defeated Trick Williams to retain the NXT Championship. In other prominent matches, Tatum Paxley defeated Jacy Jayne to win the NXT Women's Championship and NXT's DarkState (Dion Lennox and Osiris Griffin) defeated TNA's The Broken Hardys (Broken Matt Hardy and Brother Nero) in a Broken Rules match to win the NXT Tag Team Championship.

The event received mixed to positive reviews from fans and critics, with many considering it to be an improvement over the previous year's event, as well as the NXT Women's Championship match receiving universal acclaim along with the NXT North American Championship match receiving praise. This was the first Halloween Havoc to livestream on Netflix in most markets outside the United States following the WWE Network's merger under the service in January 2025 in those affected areas, and it would also be the last on the WWE Network in any country as the last few countries that were still on the service due to pre-existing contracts merged under Netflix on April 1, 2026. It was also the final Halloween Havoc to air on Disney+ in the Philippines and Abema in Japan before they too merged under Netflix on January 1 and October 1, 2026, respectively, as well as the last to air on Peacock in the United States, as The CW acquired the rights to broadcast NXT's PLEs in April 2026, and then that August, all of NXT's programming also began simulcasting on ESPN Unlimited.

== Production ==
=== Background ===
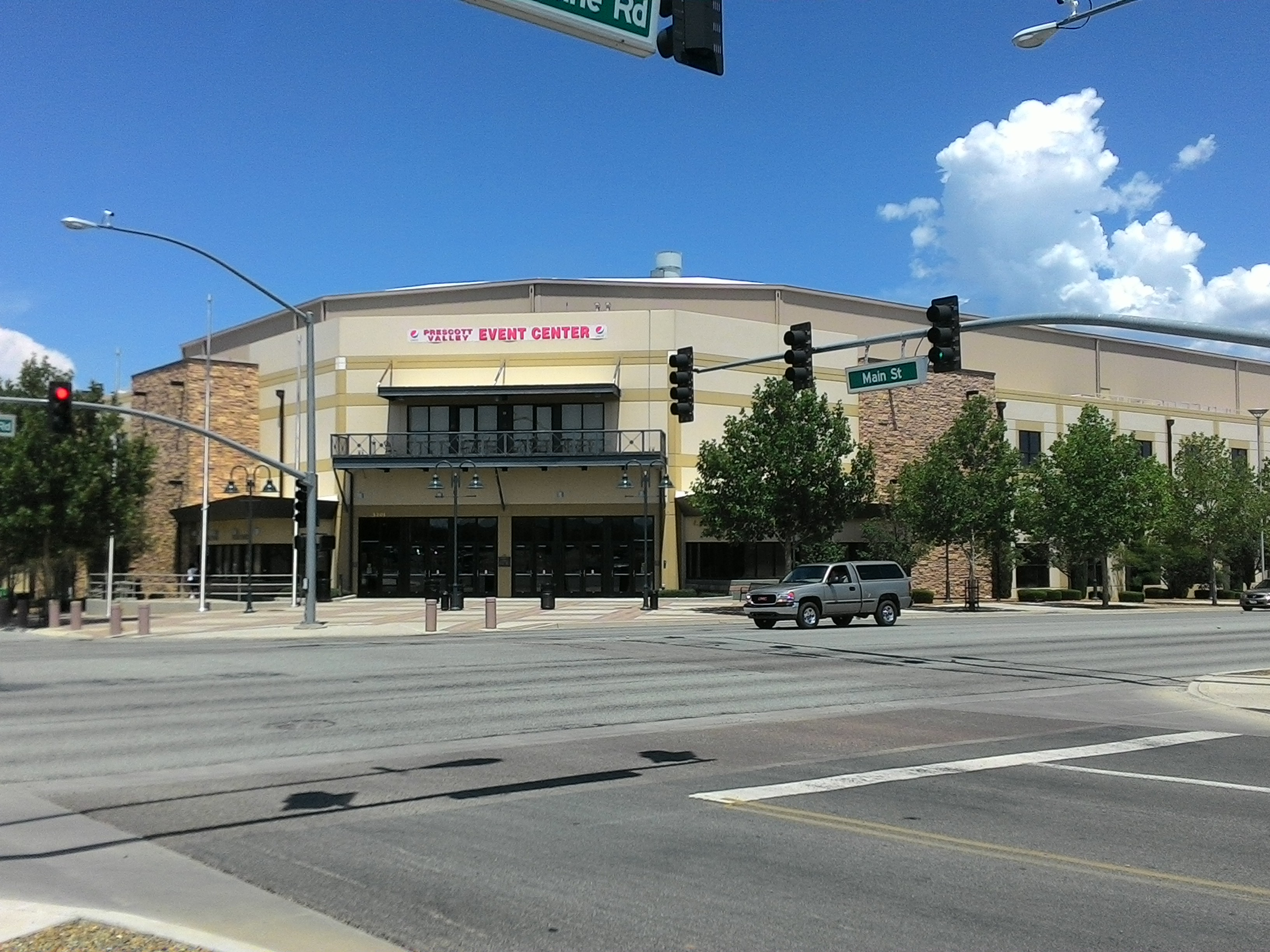
NXT's sixth annual Halloween Havoc, and the 18th Halloween Havoc overall, was held at the Findlay Toyota Center in Prescott Valley, Arizona (pictured in 2016 under its previous name of Prescott Valley Convention & Events Center).

Halloween Havoc is a professional wrestling event established in 1989, held in October as part of the month's Halloween festivities. It was originally produced as an annual pay-per-view (PPV) event by the former World Championship Wrestling (WCW) from 1989 until 2000. Following WWE's acquisition of WCW in March 2001, WWE reinstated Halloween Havoc as an annual event for its developmental brand, NXT, in 2020. The 2020, 2021, and 2023 events were held as television specials of the NXT program on the USA Network, but for 2022, it was a premium live event (PLE). The 2023 edition was also two nights, but it returned as a one-night PLE in 2024.

On August 24, 2025, at Heatwave, it was announced that WWE's sixth NXT Halloween Havoc, and the 18th Halloween Havoc overall, would be held as a PLE on Saturday, October 25, 2025, at the Findlay Toyota Center in Prescott Valley, Arizona. Beginning with Halloween Havoc in 2024, all major NXT events (with the exception of the 2025 editions of The Great American Bash and No Mercy, which were changed for promotional purposes) were branded solely with the WWE logo instead of the NXT logo. However, while the 2025 Halloween Havoc was originally promoted with just the WWE logo, this was later changed to include the NXT logo.

=== Broadcast outlets ===
The PLE was broadcast on WWE's livestreaming platforms. These included Peacock in the United States, SuperSport in Sub-Saharan Africa, Disney+ in the Philippines, Abema in Japan, Netflix in most other international markets, and the WWE Network in a select few countries that had not yet transferred to Netflix due to pre-existing contracts. This marked the first Halloween Havoc to livestream on Netflix following the WWE Network's merger under the service in January in those areas.

=== Storylines ===
Other on-screen personnel
Role:	Name:
Commentators	Vic Joseph
Commentators	Booker T
Spanish commentators	Marcelo Rodríguez
Spanish commentators	Jerry Soto
Ring announcer	Mike Rome
Referees	Adrian Butler
Referees	Victoria D'Errico
Referees	Chip Danning
Referees	Dallas Irvin
Referees	Derek Sanders
Referees	Felix Fernandez
Interviewers	Sarah Schreiber
Interviewers	Kelly Kincaid
Interviewers	Blake Howard
Pre-show panel	Megan Morant
Pre-show panel	Sam Roberts

The event included six matches that resulted from scripted storylines. Results were predetermined by WWE's writers on the NXT brand, while storylines were produced on WWE's weekly television program, NXT.

At NXT vs. TNA Showdown, NXT General Manager Ava announced that on the following episode of NXT, there would be a battle royal to determine the #1 contender for Jacy Jayne's NXT Women's Championship at Halloween Havoc. It was also announced that the battle royal would feature wrestlers from NXT's partner promotion, Total Nonstop Action Wrestling (TNA). The match was won by Tatum Paxley.

At NXT vs. TNA Showdown, TNA's The Hardy Boyz (Matt Hardy and Jeff Hardy) defeated NXT's DarkState (Dion Lennox and Osiris Griffin) in a Winners Take All match to retain the TNA World Tag Team Championship and win the NXT Tag Team Championship, becoming the first TNA-contracted wrestlers to hold a WWE title. On the following episode of NXT, a rematch for the NXT Tag Team Championship was scheduled for Halloween Havoc, although it was not confirmed if it would be Lennox, Griffin, Saquon Shugars, or Cutler James that would represent DarkState. Later that night, The Hardy Boyz were attacked by DarkState. The following week, The Hardy Boyz, reviving their "Broken" personas for the first time in WWE (although Matt previously did a "Woken" version of the character) announced that the bout would be a Broken Rules match.

At No Mercy, Ricky Saints won the NXT Championship. On the following episode of NXT, Saints was announced as the men's team's captain of Team NXT against Team TNA at NXT vs. TNA Showdown. During the match, Williams walked out on Saints after Saints inadvertently tagged himself in, which infuriated Williams. This ultimately cost Team NXT the match. On the next episode of NXT, Saints called out Williams and challenged him to a title match at Halloween Havoc. A video message on the tron played with Williams stating that he would face Saints on his own time. Later that night, Williams attacked Saints backstage, accepting the challenge for Halloween Havoc, with a contract signing subsequently announced for the following episode.

At Worlds Collide: Las Vegas, El Hijo de Dr. Wagner Jr. from WWE's sister promotion Lucha Libre AAA Worldwide (AAA) successfully defended the AAA Latin American Championship in a fatal four-way match also involving NXT North American Champion Ethan Page, although Page was not pinned. After that, Wagner Jr. and Page began a rivalry, and after Page's successful title defense at No Mercy, Wagner Jr. stated his intentions of challenging for Page's title. On the October 14 episode of NXT, after Wagner Jr. won his match, he called out Page. After that, Page revealed that he would be facing Wagner Jr. for the NXT North American Championship at Halloween Havoc, with Wagner Jr. subsequently also revealing that, after speaking with NXT General Manager Ava, the match would be a Day of the Dead match.

At NXT vs. TNA Showdown, NXT Women's North American Champion and WWE Women's Speed Champion Sol Ruca and her teammate Zaria talked, with Ruca stating that she and Zaria would become the new WWE Women's Tag Team Championship. However, they were both interrupted by Blake Monroe, who called Ruca greedy for wanting three titles, and stated that Ruca was just using Zaria, who then replied that Monroe was after Ruca's championships, with Monroe stating that she was simply after the NXT Women's North American Championship. Zaria then faced Monroe on the following episode. During the match, Ruca appeared at ringside to prevent Monroe from using a chair on Zaria, however, Monroe hit Zaria with a hair pick, winning the match. Later that night, Zaria also competed in a battle royal to determine the number one contender for the NXT Women's Championship, with Ruca at ringside. However, Monroe appeared and attacked Ruca, with Zaria eliminating herself to aid Ruca. On that week's SmackDown, Monroe was in the crowd for Ruca and Zaria's WWE Women's Tag Team Championship match where it was announced that Monroe would challenge Ruca for the NXT Women's North American Championship at Halloween Havoc. During the match, Monroe distracted Ruca, costing her and Zaria the title. On October 21, it was announced that on that night's NXT, Ruca would provide an update on an injury that she suffered during the tag team championship match. There, Ruca revealed that she was not medically cleared to compete at Halloween Havoc. Zaria then offered to defend the NXT Women's North American Championship on Ruca's behalf, which was agreed by Ruca and NXT General Manager Ava.

On the October 21 episode of NXT, TNA X Division Champion Leon Slater successfully defended his championship with Je'Von Evans in his corner. After that, Evans stated that he wanted to be at Halloween Havoc with Slater, who stated that they both should be at the same side, which Evans agreed. Both then called out any team, and they were interrupted by AAA's La Parka and Mr. Iguana. Iguana then revealed that after speaking with NXT General Manager Ava, they would face Slater and Evans in a tag team match at Halloween Havoc.

== Reception ==
John Moore of Pro Wrestling Dot Net stated that the venue "was a smaller college arena, but it looked good and large enough on TV". He expected the event to get a grade of B, which it was "given the storyline development, but they gave it A stakes with meaningful and logical title changes". For the NXT Championship match, Moore called it a "well worked match" but "nothing really above and beyond. That combined with the rushed build might have made this the least interesting match on the show in the end given how nuanced the other matches were with gimmicks, time, and title changes". For the NXT Women's Championship match, Moore called it a "well worked match" and called Izzi Dame's interference as being "set up a good feud for Izzi and Tatum down the road, and Tatum might have a short title reign because of it". Moore called the NXT North American Championship match "a bit slow and ploddy for the first half to the point where it was dragging", but "Page and Wagner picked things up in the 2nd half".

Kevin Berge of Bleacher Report gave Halloween Havoc a grade of B−, calling it "an up-and-down event that showed that NXT is on the right path but may not be fully ready to commit to a changing of the guard", as "too much that came before overshadowed the NXT Championship match in terms of excitement or pure action". Berge called the NXT Women's Championship match, which he graded A+, "the real centerpiece of the show", as Jacy Jayne and Tatum Paxley "had the crowd hooked and invested throughout in the improbable rise of the perennial underdog, making the win feel all the sweeter". The Broken Rules match, which received a grade of B−, "was a spot fest the crowd adored and elevated DarkState back to the top of the tag team division". Berge concluded by stating that "there were more wins than misses for Halloween Havoc, and a reshuffle to focus on what the fans wanted to see most would have made this show truly great".

== Aftermath ==
The following episode of NXT opened with Trick Williams attacking people in the production area until NXT Champion Ricky Saints intervened. Later, NXT General Manager Ava announced that they would face each other for the title in a Last Man Standing match on the November 11 episode, where Saints retained.

Also on NXT, Sol Ruca vacated the WWE Women's Speed Championship and NXT General Manager Ava announced that a tournament would begin the following week to determine the new champion.

It was also announced that Blake Monroe would make her first NXT Women's North American Championship defense at Gold Rush. On the November 11 episode of NXT, Sol Ruca revealed that she was medically cleared and would challenge for the title at the event.

Tatum Paxley talked about her NXT Women's Championship win, but was interrupted by Izzi Dame, who didn't think Paxley was the kind of champion who could call for an open challenge. Paxley spun the wheel, with it landing on Lola Vice. Their match ended in a no-contest after interference by Fatal Influence (Jayne, Fallon Henley, and Lainey Reid). A six-woman tag team match took place the following week which Fatal Influence won when Jayne pinned Dame. As a result, Jayne was scheduled to face Paxley for the title at Week 1 of Gold Rush, where Jayne won and regained the title after Dame, Niko Vance, and Shawn Spears turned on her.

=== Broadcasting changes ===
In continuing WWE's near worldwide transition to Netflix, this would be the final Halloween Havoc to air on Disney+ in the Philippines and Abema in Japan before moving to Netflix on January 1 and October 1, 2026, respectively. Throughout 2025, many of the select few countries that were still on the WWE Network due to pre-existing contracts gradually merged to Netflix with nearly all international markets on Netflix by January 1, 2026. The last few remaining countries that were still on the WWE Network merged under Netflix on April 1, 2026, making this 2025 event the last Halloween Havoc to air on the WWE Network in any country. Additionally, this was the final Halloween Havoc to air on Peacock in the United States, as The CW acquired the rights to broadcast NXT's PLEs in April 2026, and then that August, all of NXT's programming also began simulcasting on ESPN Unlimited.

== Results ==
No.	Results	Stipulations	Times
1	Je'Von Evans and Leon Slater defeated Mr. Iguana and La Parka by pinfall	Tag team match	17:56
2	Ethan Page (c) defeated El Hijo de Dr. Wagner Jr. by pinfall	Day of the Dead match for the NXT North American Championship	18:22
3	Blake Monroe defeated Zaria (Note: Zaria defended the title on behalf of reigning champion Sol Ruca due to the latter's injury.) (c) (with Sol Ruca) by pinfall	Singles match for the NXT Women's North American Championship	11:04
4	Tatum Paxley (with Izzi Dame, Niko Vance, and Shawn Spears) defeated Jacy Jayne (c) (with Fallon Henley and Lainey Reid) by pinfall	Singles match for the NXT Women's Championship	16:28
5	DarkState (Dion Lennox and Osiris Griffin) (with Cutler James and Saquon Shugars) defeated The Broken Hardys (Broken Matt Hardy and Brother Nero) (c) by pinfall	Broken Rules match for the NXT Tag Team Championship	19:08
6	Ricky Saints (c) defeated Trick Williams by pinfall	Singles match for the NXT Championship	16:48
(c) / – the champion(s) heading into the match
