= NXT vs. TNA Showdown =

2025 professional wrestling television special

- Promotion(s): WWE; Total Nonstop Action Wrestling
- Brand: NXT
- Date: October 7, 2025
- City: Orlando, Florida
- Venue: WWE Performance Center

NXT special episodes chronology
| ← Previous; Homecoming | Next → Gold Rush |

NXT vs. TNA Showdown (also stylized as ShoWdown) was a professional wrestling television special co-produced by WWE and partner promotion Total Nonstop Action Wrestling (TNA) for wrestlers from WWE's NXT brand division and TNA. The event took place on Tuesday, October 7, 2025, at the WWE Performance Center in Orlando, Florida and aired live as a special episode of NXT on The CW. It featured direct competition between wrestlers from both companies.

The special was originally named Invasion, reviving the "Invasion" event name from 2001, however, due to controversy regarding the name and date coinciding with the second anniversary of the October 7 attacks in Southern Israel in 2023, WWE changed the name to Showdown.

Four matches were contested at the event. The event featured two NXT vs. TNA themed Survivor Series style elimination matches, with one each for the men and women. The main event was the men's match where Team TNA (Mike Santana, Frankie Kazarian, Moose, and Leon Slater) defeated Team NXT (Ricky Saints, Trick Williams, Je'Von Evans, and Myles Borne) with Joe Hendry serving as special guest referee, while for the women's match, Team NXT (Jacy Jayne, Jaida Parker, Sol Ruca, and Lola Vice) defeated Team TNA (Kelani Jordan, Jessie McKay, Cassie Lee, and Mara Sadè) with Jordynne Grace serving as the special guest referee. In another prominent match which was the opening bout, TNA World Tag Team Champions The Hardy Boyz (Jeff Hardy and Matt Hardy) defeated NXT Tag Team Champions DarkState (Dion Lennox and Osiris Griffin) in a Winners Take All match to retain their TNA title and win NXT's, becoming the first TNA-contracted wrestlers to win a WWE title.

== Production ==
=== Background ===
In January 2024, the American professional wrestling promotions WWE and Total Nonstop Action Wrestling (TNA) began working with each other, leading to an official partnership in January 2025, providing more opportunities for wrestlers from WWE's NXT brand and TNA. After weeks of storylines on television that saw NXT and TNA wrestlers "invading" shows and fighting each other, on September 27, 2025, during the NXT No Mercy event, NXT General Manager Ava announced NXT vs. TNA Invasion, a special episode of NXT on The CW, reviving the Invasion name from 2001. It was scheduled for October 7, 2025, and to be held at the WWE Performance Center in Orlando, Florida. However, the show was rebranded as Showdown due to the show's name and date sparking controversy relating to the October 7 attacks in southern Israel from 2023.

This episode aired head-to-head against All Elite Wrestling's Homecoming: Title Tuesday special of Dynamite on TBS and HBO Max due to a scheduling conflict with Major League Baseball (MLB) postseason games in its regular time slot on TNT Sports channels.

=== Storylines ===
The event included matches that resulted from scripted storylines. Results were predetermined by the writers of the participating promotions, while storylines were produced on WWE’s weekly television program, NXT and TNA's weekly television program, Impact!, following WWE and TNA signing a multi-year partnership in January 2025.

At NXT: Homecoming on September 16, Raw's Grayson Waller hosted a special edition of his talk show The Grayson Waller Effect featuring NXT Champion Oba Femi and his No Mercy challenger Ricky Saints. However, they were all interrupted by TNA World Champion Trick Williams, who lost the NXT Championship to Femi at NXT: New Year's Evil in January and had since vowed to regain it. Williams demanded another title match, with Waller then proposing a Winner Takes All match between Femi and Williams, which both men agreed to, and the match was made official. During the event, several TNA wrestlers voiced their displeasure on X after the announcement of the match. The following week, the match ended in a disqualification victory for Williams after he attacked Mike Santana, who was slated to challenge Williams for his title at TNA's flagship show Bound for Glory, which prompted Santana to attack Williams. Following this, a brawl ensued between NXT and TNA wrestlers as the show went off the air. At No Mercy—where Saints defeated Femi to win the NXT Championship—NXT General Manager Ava announced a special episode of NXT titled Invasion that would take place on October 7, with two Survivor Series-style matches, pitting four NXT men and women against four TNA men and women, respectively. Ava and TNA Director of Authority Santino Marella announced the teams on the September 30 episode of NXT, where it was also revealed that the special was renamed as Showdown. Ava named Saints as NXT's men's team captain and NXT Women's Champion Jacy Jayne as the women's team captain. Williams and Je'Von Evans were subsequently added to the men's team, while the last spot was determined by a match where Myles Borne defeated Josh Briggs. For the women's team, Jaida Parker and NXT Women's North American Champion and WWE Women's Speed Champion Sol Ruca were added to the team, while the last spot was determined by a match where Lola Vice defeated Fallon Henley. Marella then named Santana as TNA's men's team captain, and TNA Knockouts World Champion Kelani Jordan as TNA's women's team captain, despite Jordan being an NXT wrestler. Later, the rest of TNA's men's team was announced to include TNA International Champion Frankie Kazarian, Moose, and TNA X Division Champion Leon Slater, while the women's team was announced to include The IInspiration (Cassie Lee and Jessie McKay) and Mara Sadè. Also on the same episode, Jordan and Santana stated that they did not trust NXT's Jordynne Grace and TNA's Joe Hendry as Grace was previously from TNA, and Hendry, despite still a TNA wrestler, made constant appearances in NXT. Both then stated that they should be involved at Showdown in some capacity, however, after neither were chosen by either of the teams, both voiced their displeasure on X. Two days later, Ava announced that Grace would be the special guest referee for the women's match, with Marella subsequently making Hendry the special guest referee for the men's match.

At No Mercy, NXT General Manager Ava announced that at Showdown, a Winners Take All match between TNA World Tag Team Champions The Hardys (Matt Hardy and Jeff Hardy) and NXT Tag Team Champions DarkState (Dion Lennox and Osiris Griffin) would take place, and after the brawl on the September 23 episode of NXT, Ava also announced that everyone would be banned from ringside.

On the September 30 episode of NXT, Ethan Page discussed his successful NXT North American Championship defense at No Mercy, until he was interrupted by TNA wrestler Mustafa Ali, who reminded Page that he was still owed a title match he initially earned prior to his release from WWE in September 2023. Ali also revealed that after speaking with NXT General Manager Ava and TNA Director of Authority Santino Marella, he would challenge Page for the title at Showdown.

== Controversy ==
The event's initial name of "NXT Invasion" garnered controversy in both Israel and amongst the Jewish diaspora as it was being held on October 7, coinciding with the second anniversary of the attacks by Hamas and its allied militants which were described by The Washington Post as an "invasion". Jonathan Duschnitzky of the Israel Hayom newspaper wrote: "The choice of the name and the date – a day when Israel commemorates the memory of the massacre from October 7, 2023 – is viewed as extreme insensitivity". The executive chairman of WWE's parent company, TKO Group Holdings, Ari Emanuel's father served in the Irgun paramilitary group which contributed to the foundation of Israel, and was also responsible for the King David Hotel bombing in 1946 and the Deir Yassin massacre against the Palestinian Arab population in 1948. Concerns were also raised that the Invasion name would invoke memories of the October 7 invasion of Afghanistan which began after the September 11 attacks.

While WWE did change the name of the special, it has not been explicitly stated if Duschnitzky's comments and other concerns were the reason.

== Results ==
| No. | Results | Stipulations | Times |
|---|---|---|---|
| 1 | The Hardy Boyz (Matt Hardy and Jeff Hardy) (TNA) defeated DarkState (Dion Lennox and Osiris Griffin) (NXT) by pinfall | Winners Take All match for the TNA World Tag Team Championship and the NXT Tag Team Championship; Everyone was banned from ringside. | 10:44 |
| 2 | Team NXT (Jacy Jayne, Jaida Parker, Sol Ruca, and Lola Vice) defeated Team TNA (Kelani Jordan, Jessie McKay, Cassie Lee, and Mara Sadè) | 4-on-4 women's Survivor Series style elimination match Jordynne Grace was the special guest referee. | 23:11 |
| 3 | Ethan Page (c) defeated Mustafa Ali by pinfall | Singles match for the NXT North American Championship | 14:19 |
| 4 | Team TNA (Mike Santana, Frankie Kazarian, Moose, and Leon Slater) defeated Team NXT (Ricky Saints, Trick Williams, Je'Von Evans, and Myles Borne) | 4-on-4 men's Survivor Series style elimination match Joe Hendry was the special guest referee. | 22:49 |
(c) / – the champion(s) heading into the match

=== Survivor Series style elimination matches ===
Team

– NXT
– TNA

Women's

| Eliminated | Wrestler | Eliminated by | Method | Time |
|---|---|---|---|---|
| 1 | Jaida Parker | Mara Sadè | Pinfall | 12:59 |
| 2 | Mara Sadè | Sol Ruca | Pinfall | 13:19 |
| 3 | Cassie Lee | Lola Vice | Pinfall | 19:07 |
| 4 | Jessie McKay | Lola Vice | Submission | 19:26 |
| 5 | Lola Vice | Kelani Jordan | Pinfall | 21:21 |
| 6 | Kelani Jordan | Jacy Jayne | Pinfall | 23:11 |
| Survivor(s) | Jacy Jayne and Sol Ruca (Team NXT) | | | |

Men's

| Eliminated | Wrestler | Eliminated by | Method | Time |
|---|---|---|---|---|
| 1 | Myles Borne | Frankie Kazarian | Pinfall | 2:21 |
| 2 | Je'Von Evans | Leon Slater | Pinfall | 11:14 |
| 3 | Trick Williams | N/A | Walked out | 17:10 |
| 4 | Frankie Kazarian | Ricky Saints | Pinfall | 17:50 |
| 5 | Leon Slater | Ricky Saints | Pinfall | 19:07 |
| 6 | Ricky Saints | Mike Santana | Pinfall | 22:49 |
| Survivor(s) | Mike Santana and Moose (Team TNA) | | | |
