= NXT No Mercy (2025) =

WWE premium live event

- Promotiona poster featuring Blake Monroe, Ricky Saints, Oba Femi, Jacy Jayne, and Lola Vice
- Promotion: WWE
- Brand: NXT
- Date: September 27, 2025
- City: Fort Lauderdale, Florida
- Venue: FTL War Memorial
- Attendance: 1,386

WWE event chronology
| ← Previous; Wrestlepalooza | Next → Crown Jewel |

No Mercy chronology
| ← Previous; 2024 | Next → Final |

NXT major events chronology
| ← Previous; Heatwave | Next → Halloween Havoc |

The 2025 NXT No Mercy, also promoted as NXT No Mercy: Fort Lauderdale, was a professional wrestling premium live event (PLE) produced by WWE, held exclusively for wrestlers from the promotion's developmental brand, NXT. It was NXT's third annual No Mercy and WWE's 16th and final overall. The event took place on Saturday, September 27, 2025, at the FTL War Memorial in Fort Lauderdale, Florida. This was the first No Mercy to broadcast on Netflix in most international markets following the WWE Network's merger under Netflix in January 2025 in those areas.

Six matches were contested at the event. In the main event, Ricky Saints defeated Oba Femi to win the NXT Championship. In other prominent matches, Jordynne Grace defeated Blake Monroe in a Weaponized Steel Cage match, and Jacy Jayne defeated Lola Vice to retain the NXT Women's Championship.

== Production ==
=== Background ===
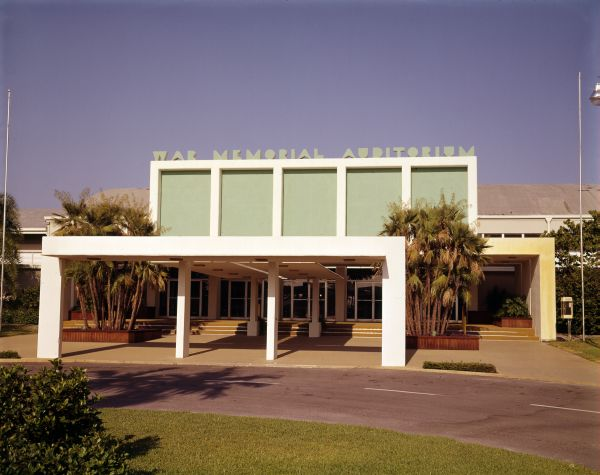
NXT's third annual No Mercy, and WWE's 16th overall, was held at the FTL War Memorial in Fort Lauderdale, Florida.

No Mercy was first held by WWE as a United Kingdom-exclusive professional wrestling pay-per-view (PPV) event in May 1999, before it became the promotion's annual October PPV that same year, but held in the United States, until 2008. No Mercy was discontinued in 2009, but it was reinstated in October 2016 following the reintroduction of the brand extension, where it also began simulcasting on WWE's livestreaming platforms. No Mercy, however, was discontinued again following its September 2017 edition as WWE ended production of brand-exclusive PPV and livestreaming events for the main roster following WrestleMania 34 in April 2018, resulting in the reduction of these events produced per year. In 2023, WWE again reinstated No Mercy to be held in September, becoming an annual premium live event (PLE) for its developmental brand, NXT.

On August 24, 2025, at Heatwave, it was announced that a third NXT No Mercy, and WWE's 16th overall, would be held on Saturday, September 27, 2025, in Fort Lauderdale, Florida at the FTL War Memorial. The event was in turn promoted as NXT No Mercy: Fort Lauderdale. Beginning with Halloween Havoc in 2024, all major NXT events (with the exception of the 2025 Great American Bash) were branded solely with the WWE logo instead of the NXT logo; the 2025 No Mercy would have been the first No Mercy event to solely use the promotion's logo since the 2017 event but this was later changed with the addition of the NXT logo.

=== Broadcast outlets ===
The PLE was broadcast on WWE's livestreaming platforms. These included Peacock in the United States, SuperSport in Sub-Saharan Africa, Disney+ in the Philippines, Abema in Japan, Netflix in most other international markets, and the WWE Network in a select few countries that had not yet transferred to Netflix due to pre-existing contracts. This marked the first No Mercy to livestream on Netflix following the WWE Network's merger under the service in January in those areas. Peacock had retained the rights to broadcast NXT's PLEs after the loss of its main roster events to ESPN's direct-to-consumer streaming service, which began with Wrestlepalooza one week before.

=== Storylines ===
The event included six matches that resulted from scripted storylines. Results were predetermined by WWE's writers on the NXT brand, while storylines were produced on WWE's weekly television program, NXT.

At Heatwave, Lola Vice won a triple threat match to earn a future NXT Women's Championship match against champion Jacy Jayne. Later that night, it was announced that the title match would take place at No Mercy.

At Heatwave, NXT General Manager Ava announced that both the WWE Speed Championship and WWE Women's Speed Championship would now be exclusive to NXT. Ava also announced that a tournament would begin on the September 2 episode of NXT, with the winner of the tournament challenging champion Sol Ruca for the Women's Speed Championship at No Mercy. Ava subsequently revealed that the participants of the tournament would be SmackDown's Candice LeRae, Lucha Libre AAA Worldwide's (AAA) Faby Apache, Total Nonstop Action Wrestling's (TNA) Xia Brookside, and NXT's Lainey Reid. The finals took place on the September 23 episode, where Reid defeated LeRae. However, moments before the event, Shawn Michaels announced that Reid sustained an injury during training, and Ruca would defend the championship against a to be announced opponent at the event.

At NXT: New Year's Evil in January 2025, Oba Femi won the NXT Championship from Trick Williams in a triple threat match. Williams vowed to regain the championship, and three months later at Stand & Deliver, Williams faced Femi in another triple threat match for the title, but failed to win. After that, Williams would win the TNA World Championship at Battleground. At The Great American Bash, Femi successfully defended his title against Josh Briggs's tag team partner Yoshiki Inamura. During the match, Briggs tried to interfere, much to Inamura's dismay, who wanted to win the match without any help. On the July 22 episode of NXT, Femi retained his title in a triple threat match against both Briggs and Inamura. After the match, Briggs attacked Inamura, turning heel in the process. On the August 19 episode of NXT, Briggs defeated Inamura in a Philadelphia Street Fight, Ricky Saints defeated Jasper Troy, who Saints was in a rivalry with, and Williams, who kept trying for another shot at the NXT Championship, lost a number one conteder's match for a shot at the title at Heatwave. At the event, both Briggs and Saints announced their intentions to challenge for the title, and later that night after Femi successfully defended his title, he was confronted by Saints. Two days later on NXT, Saints called out Femi, but was interrupted by Briggs, who stated that Saints did not deserve a title shot. After some exchange of words, NXT General Manager Ava scheduled a match between Saints and Briggs for later that night where the winner would challenge for the NXT Championship at No Mercy. The match was won by Saints. However, at NXT: Homecoming on September 16, Raw's Grayson Waller hosted his talk show The Grayson Waller Effect with both Femi and Saints. They were all interrupted by Williams, still wanting an NXT Championship match. Waller then proposed a Winner Takes All match between Femi and Williams for the following week with both titles on the line, which both men agreed, and it was subsequently made official, with the winner facing Saints for the NXT Championship at No Mercy. Femi subsequently retained the NXT Championship after the match ended in disqualification when TNA's Mike Santana, who was set to face Williams for the TNA World Championship at TNA's Bound for Glory, attacked Williams at ringside during the title match.

Since August, Tavion Heights had been feuding with NXT North American Champion Ethan Page. Heights took issue with Page insulting the United States and arguing that his native Canada was superior. At Heatwave, Heights lost a mixed tag team match against Page. After the event, their rivalry continued, leading to a Flag match on the September 9 episode of NXT, where Heights defeated Page by grabbing the American flag. The following week at NXT: Homecoming, SmackDown's Damian Priest appeared and praised Heights. After that, Priest announced that after speaking with NXT General Manager Ava, Heights would face Page for the title at No Mercy.

At Heatwave, Blake Monroe defeated Jordynne Grace. Two days later on NXT, Grace interfered in Monroe's match, costing her the match. On the following episode after Grace had won her match, Monroe appeared, with both women brawling, being separated by WWE personnel. Three weeks later on the September 23 episode after Grace had won her match, Monroe appeared once again with a kendo stick. Grace grabbed a steel chair and they brawled, being separated once again by WWE personnel. After that, co-assistants to NXT General Manager Ava, Stevie Turner and Mr. Stone, appeared. Turner then scheduled a weapons match between Grace and Monroe at No Mercy, with Stone subsequently stating that the match would also be a steel cage match.

On the September 2 episode of NXT, Je'Von Evans addressed failing to win the NXT Championship match at Heatwave when he was interrupted by The Undertaker's theme song, who had given some advice to Evans back on the July 22 episode. However, it was revealed to be Josh Briggs faking it, who took issue with Evans getting several title matches at his young age. Briggs also stated that Evans should have demanded a title match, however, since Evans did not do so, a #1 contenders match was scheduled for the previous week, which Briggs lost. After Evans asked if Briggs thinks he knew him, Briggs attacked Evans and stated that Evans should learn when to stay down. Briggs then performed a Chokeslam on Evans onto a chair. The following week, Briggs defeated Evans in a match after Briggs punched Evans with a chain. At NXT: Homecoming, Briggs and Evans brawled backstage, and on the following episode of NXT, it was confirmed that Briggs and Evans would face each other at No Mercy.

== Event ==
Other on-screen personnel
| Role: | Name: |
|---|---|
| Commentators | Vic Joseph |
| Commentators | Booker T |
| Spanish commentators | Marcelo Rodríguez |
| Spanish commentators | Jerry Soto |
| Ring announcer | Mike Rome |
| Referees | Adrian Butler |
| Referees | Victoria D'Errico |
| Referees | Chip Danning |
| Referees | Dallas Irvin |
| Referees | Derek Sanders |
| Referees | Felix Fernandez |
| Interviewer | Kelly Kincaid |
| Pre-show panel | Megan Morant |
| Pre-show panel | Sam Roberts |

=== Preliminary matches ===
The PLE began with Je'Von Evans taking on Josh Briggs. In the climax, Briggs performed a clothesline on Evans, who placed his foot on the rope to void the pin. Evans gained the upper hand on Briggs and pinned him following a Springboard Cutter to win the match.

In the second match, Sol Ruca (accompanied by Zaria) defended the WWE Women's Speed Championship against Jaida Parker. In the end, as Zaria distracted Parker, Lash Legend appeared and Parker moved out of the way, causing Zaria to spear Legend instead. This allowed Ruca to perform the Sol Snatcher on Parker to retain the title.

After that, Jordynne Grace took on Blake Monroe in a weaponized steel cage match. Throughout the match, Grace and Monroe used chairs, kendo sticks, a trash can, a weightlifting belt, and diamonds as weapons. Grace performed a Samoan drop on Grace onto the diamonds for a nearfall. Monroe performed a double stomp on Grace onto the trash can for a nearfall. In the end, after Grace and Monroe traded blows on top of the cage, Monroe tossed pocked powder on Grace's face. However, Grace recovered and performed an Air Raid Crash on Monroe onto the table and diamonds to win the match.

Next, NXT General Manager Ava announced that on October 7, there would be an "Invasion"-themed NXT show with TNA World Tag Team Champions The Hardys (Matt Hardy and Jeff Hardy) taking on NXT Tag Team Champions DarkState (Dion Lennox and Osiris Griffin) in a Champion vs. Champion match and two Survivor Series-style matches pitting NXT's teams against TNA's.

Afterwards, Lash Legend talked about taking Zaria's spear costing Jaida Parker her match. Parker showed up and engaged in a brawl with Legend before being separated by security.

In the fourth match, Ethan Page defended the NXT North American Championship against Tavion Heights. During the match, Heights applied the Ankle Lock on Page, who reached the ropes to break the hold. After two pinning attempts by Heights, Page performed a spin kick and Ego's Edge on Heights for a nearfall. In the end, as Heights applied a sleeper hold on Page on the top rope, Page countered into a Super Powerslam and followed up with Twisted Grin to retain the title. After the match, El Hijo del Dr. Wagner Jr. appeared on the monitor and announced that he would be going after Page's title in the future.

Following that, Mike Santana and Frankie Kazarian both announced that they would appear on the following episode of NXT.

In the penultimate match, Jacy Jayne (accompanied by Fallon Henley) defended the NXT Women's Championship against Lola Vice. During the match, after Vice performed a spinning roundhouse kick on Jayne, Henley pulled the referee out of the ring and got ejected as a result. As Jayne taunted Vice's family, who were seated ringside, Vice performed a Tornado DDT on Jayne and followed up with a Guillotine. In the end, after more back and forth action, a masked woman attacked Vice outside the ring. This allowed Jayne to perform the Rolling Encore on Vice to retain the title.

=== Main event ===
In the main event, Oba Femi defended the NXT Championship against Ricky Saints. Femi dominated most of the match, but Saints stayed in the match while performing Undertaker's Old School move and a Samoan drop. In the closing moments, as Femi cleared the announce table, Saints intercepted him with a DDT, followed by a Tornado DDT. However, Femi recovered and chopped Saints on the apron followed by a Fall from Grace for a nearfall. Afterwards, Saints countered the move into a DDT and a Tornado DDT to win the title.

== Aftermath ==
NXT Champion Ricky Saints opened the following episode of NXT to talk about his win, and was subsequently interrupted by NXT Women's Champion Jacy Jayne, who warned him about TNA's upcoming invasion. NXT General Manager Ava subsequently named them the captains of their respective NXT teams against TNA's, where it was also announced that the special would be renamed Showdown.

Also on NXT, Jaida Parker faced and defeated Lash Legend, followed by Lola Vice defeating Fallon Henley.

Ethan Page talked about his successful NXT North American Championship defense and was interrupted by Mustafa Ali, who reminded Page that he was still owed a title match he initially earned prior to his release in September 2023. This set up a title match between the two for NXT vs. TNA Showdown, where Page retained. After El Hijo Del Dr. Wagner Jr.'s win on the October 14 episode of NXT, he called out NXT North American Champion Ethan Page. This set up a title match between the two for Halloween Havoc, stipulated as a Day of the Dead match.

This would be the final No Mercy held as another event was not scheduled for 2026.

== Results ==
| No. | Results | Stipulations | Times |
|---|---|---|---|
| 1 | Je'Von Evans defeated Josh Briggs by pinfall | Singles match | 16:28 |
| 2 | Sol Ruca (c) (with Zaria) defeated Jaida Parker by pinfall | Singles match for the WWE Women's Speed Championship | 4:48 |
| 3 | Jordynne Grace defeated Blake Monroe by pinfall | Weaponized Steel Cage match | 16:12 |
| 4 | Ethan Page (c) defeated Tavion Heights by pinfall | Singles match for the NXT North American Championship | 10:20 |
| 5 | Jacy Jayne (c) (with Fallon Henley) defeated Lola Vice by pinfall | Singles match for the NXT Women's Championship | 18:35 |
| 6 | Ricky Saints defeated Oba Femi (c) by pinfall | Singles match for the NXT Championship | 17:20 |
(c) / – the champion(s) heading into the match

=== WWE Women's Speed Championship #1 Contender's Tournament ===
1st Round; NXT; September 2–9, 2025
SmackDown | Candice LeRae | Pinfall
TNA | Xia Brookside | 2:36
AAA | Faby Apache | 2:41
NXT | Lainey Reid | Pinfall

Semifinals; NXT; September 23, 2025
SmackDown | Candice LeRae | 2:24
NXT | Lainey Reid | Pinfall

Championship match No Mercy; September 27, 2025
NXT | Sol Ruca (c) | Pinfall
NXT | Jaida Parker (Note: Jaida Parker replaced the injured Lainey Reid.) | 4:48
