= DarkState =

Professional wrestling stable

Stable
- Members: Dion Lennox; Cutler James; Osiris Griffin
- Name: DarkState
- Billed heights: Lennox: 6 ft 2 in (1.88 m); James: 6 ft 5 in (1.96 m); Griffin: 6 ft 3 in (1.91 m)
- Combined billed weight: 907 lb (411 kg)
- Former members: Saquon Shugars
- Debut: February 15, 2025
- Years active: 2025–present

DarkState is an American villainous professional wrestling stable that performs in WWE appearing on the NXT and Evolve brands. The group consists of Dion Lennox, Cutler James, and Osiris Griffin. They are former two-time NXT Tag Team Champions.

== History ==
After losing multiple matches and feeling disrespected in late 2024 and early 2025, Lennox began to have a change of attitude on the January 21, 2025 episode of NXT after losing to Wes Lee. He returned at NXT Vengeance Day on February 15 with James, Shugars, and Griffin, attacking Josh Briggs and Yoshiki Inamura and NXT Tag Team Champions Nathan Frazer and Axiom as well as NXT Champion Oba Femi after their respective matches, turning heel in the process. The group made their second appearance at NXT: Roadblock on March 11, where they attacked Je'Von Evans after his match. On the following week, the group's name was revealed as DarkState with Lennox revealed as their leader. On the April 8 episode of NXT, Lennox, James and Shugars defeated Trick Williams, Evans and Femi in a six-man tag team match in their first match as a team. At NXT Stand & Deliver on April 19, Lennox, Osiris and Shugars faced The Family (Tony D'Angelo, Channing "Stacks" Lorenzo, and Luca Crusifino), where DarkState won after Stacks turned on his team. On the July 3, 2025 episode of TNA Impact!, DarkState made their Total Nonstop Action Wrestling (TNA) debut where they attacked Matt Cardona. At NXT Heatwave, Lennox and Griffin defeated Hank and Tank (Hank Walker and Tank Ledger) to win the NXT Tag Team Championship. At NXT vs. TNA Showdown on October 7, Lennox and Griffin lost the titles to TNA World Tag Team Champions The Hardy Boyz in a Winners Take All match, ending their reign at 44 days. At NXT Halloween Havoc on October 25, Lennox and Griffin regained the NXT Tag Team Championships from The Hardy Boyz, who wrestled as The Broken Hardys, in a Broken Rules match. On the December 10 episode of NXT, Lennox handed Shugars his half of the NXT Tag Team Championship in order to focus on the Iron Survivor match at NXT Deadline, thus making Shugars a champion alongside Griffin.

On the February 24 episode of NXT, Griffin and Shugars lost the NXT Tag Team Championship to The Vanity Project (Brad Baylor and Ricky Smokes) after interference from Tony D'Angelo. On the May 19 edition of NXT, after weeks of tension within the group, DarkState failed to regain the NXT Tag Team Championships from The Vanity Project. After the match, Shugars, who got pinned, was ruthlessly assaulted by the other members and was removed from DarkState. James made his Evolve brand debut on the June 10 episode of Evolve, defeating It's Gal.

== Championships and accomplishments ==
- WWE
  - NXT Tag Team Championship (2 times) – Lennox and Griffin (1), Lennox/Shugars and Griffin (1)
