= NXT Heatwave (2025) =

WWE premium live event

- Promotional poster featuring Jacy Jayne, Sol Ruca, Ricky Saints, Oba Femi, and Blake Monroe
- Promotion: WWE
- Brand: NXT
- Date: August 24, 2025
- City: Lowell, Massachusetts
- Venue: Lowell Memorial Auditorium
- Attendance: 1,830

WWE event chronology
← Previous; SummerSlam	Next → Clash in Paris

Heatwave chronology
← Previous; 2024	Next → 2026 (AAA) / (NXT)

NXT major events chronology
← Previous; The Great American Bash	Next → No Mercy

The 2025 NXT Heatwave, also promoted as NXT Heatwave: Massachusetts, was a professional wrestling premium live event (PLE) produced by WWE, held for wrestlers from the promotion's developmental brand, NXT. It was WWE's fourth annual NXT Heatwave and the 11th Heatwave overall. The event took place on Sunday, August 24, 2025, at the Lowell Memorial Auditorium in Lowell, Massachusetts. The event went head-to-head against All Elite Wrestling's pay-per-view (PPV) event, Forbidden Door.

Six matches were contested at the event. While primarily held for NXT, the event also featured wrestlers from WWE's partner promotion, Total Nonstop Action Wrestling (TNA). In the main event, Oba Femi defeated Je'Von Evans to retain the NXT Championship. In other prominent matches, TNA's Ash by Elegance defeated TNA's Masha Slamovich and NXT's Jacy Jayne in a triple threat match to win the TNA Knockouts World Championship, and Blake Monroe defeated Jordynne Grace.

This was the first Heatwave to broadcast on Netflix in most international markets following the WWE Network's merger under Netflix in January 2025 in those areas, and it would also be the last on the WWE Network in any country as the last few countries that were still on the service due to pre-existing contracts merged under Netflix on April 1, 2026. It was also the final Heatwave to air on Disney+ in the Philippines before it too merged under Netflix on January 1, 2026, as well as the last to air on Peacock in the United States, as The CW acquired the rights to broadcast NXT's PLEs in April 2026, and then that August, all of NXT's programming also began simulcasting on ESPN Unlimited.

== Production ==
=== Background ===
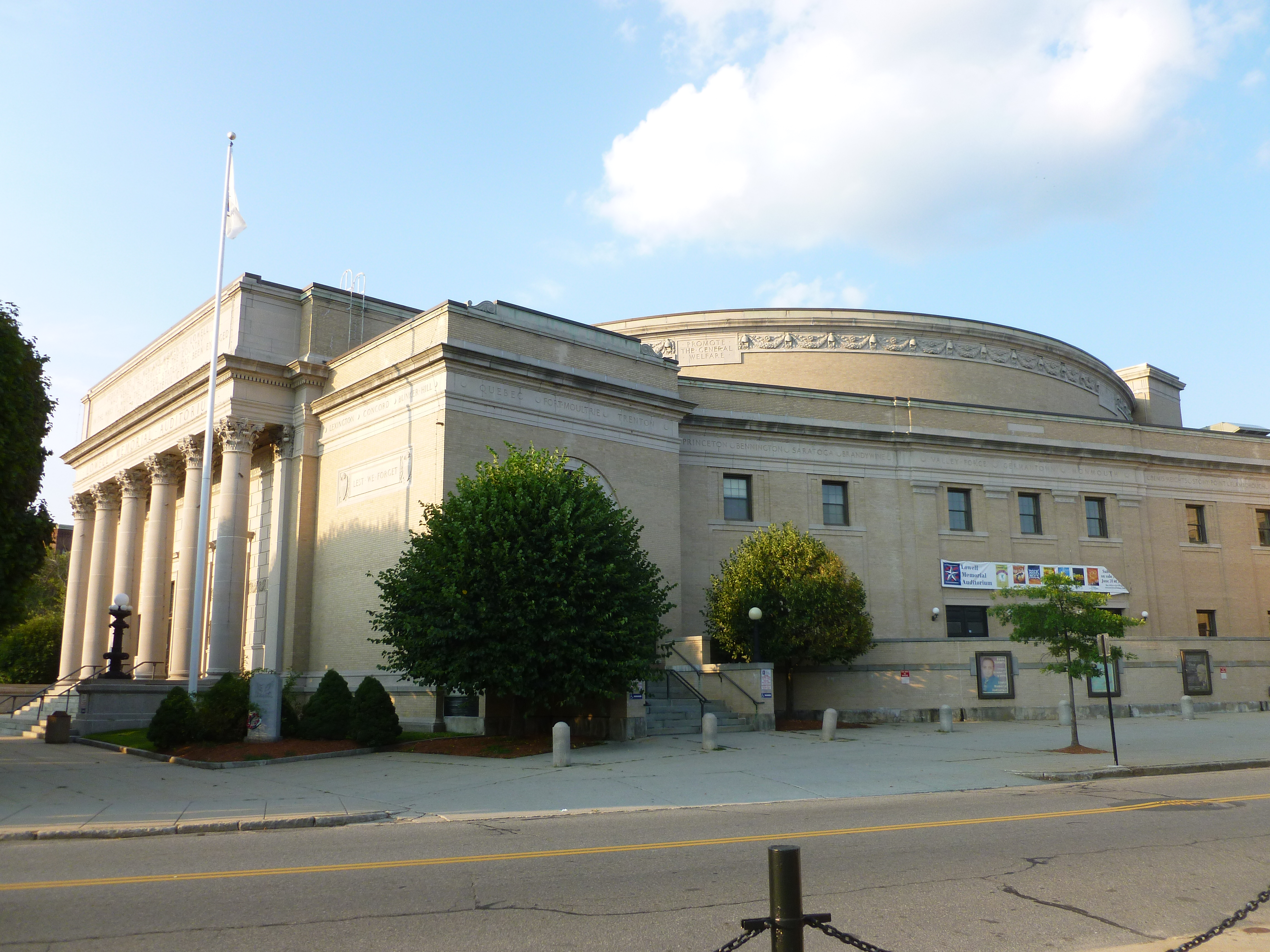
NXT's fourth annual Heatwave was held at the Lowell Memorial Auditorium in Lowell, Massachusetts.

Heatwave is a professional wrestling event established in 1994, held during the summer. After Extreme Championship Wrestling folded in 2001, the American promotion WWE acquired its assets in 2003. After 19 years since that acquisition, WWE reinstated Heatwave as its own event for its developmental brand, NXT, in 2022. It was originally held as an annual television special of the NXT program before it became a premium live event (PLE) in 2024.

On July 10, 2025, it was reported that WWE's fourth NXT Heatwave, and the 11th Heatwave overall, would be held on Sunday, August 24, 2025, at the Spartanburg Memorial Auditorium in Spartanburg, South Carolina. However, during The Great American Bash on July 12, Heatwave was announced to instead take place at the Lowell Memorial Auditorium in Lowell, Massachusetts. Beginning with Halloween Havoc in 2024, all major NXT events (with the exception of the 2025 Great American Bash event) were branded solely with the WWE logo instead of the NXT logo, marking the first and only Heatwave to just use the promotion's logo. This also marked the last NXT event to solely use the WWE logo as the brand reverted to using NXT logo beginning with NXT No Mercy.

=== Broadcast outlets ===
The PLE was broadcast on WWE's livestreaming platforms. These included Peacock in the United States, Disney+ in the Philippines, SuperSport in Sub-Saharan Africa, Abema in Japan, Netflix in most other international markets, and the WWE Network in a select few countries that had not yet transferred to Netflix due to pre-existing contracts. This marked the first Heatwave to livestream on Netflix following the WWE Network's merger under the service in January 2025 in those areas.

=== Storylines ===
The event included six matches that resulted from scripted storylines. Results were predetermined by WWE's writers on the NXT brand, while storylines were produced on WWE's weekly television program, NXT, as well as Total Nonstop Action Wrestling's (TNA) weekly television program, Impact!, following WWE and TNA signing a multi-year partnership in January 2025.

After Blake Monroe's NXT debut, she and Jordynne Grace formed an alliance, and at The Great American Bash on July 12, Grace and Monroe defeated Fatal Influence (Jacy Jayne and Fallon Henley) in a tag team match. The next night at Evolution, Grace, accompanied by Monroe, challenged Jayne for the NXT Women's Championship, but lost the match after Monroe attacked her with the championship belt, turning Monroe heel in the process. On the following NXT, a vignette aired where Monroe mocked Grace for not being worthy of an NXT Women's Championship match, and invited Grace to watch her singles debut the following week, where Monroe won. After that, Grace attacked Monroe, who would get the upper hand, injuring Grace's neck. On the July 29 episode of NXT, Monroe stated that Grace was not good enough, continuing to mock her, and one week later during Monroe's match, Grace appeared wearing a neck brace and chased Monroe out from the arena, costing her the match by countout. Later that night, NXT General Manager Ava announced that Grace would face Monroe at Heatwave.

At Stand & Deliver, Oba Femi defeated Je'Von Evans and Trick Williams to retain the NXT Championship. After that, Williams would win the TNA World Championship a month later at Battleground. On the July 22 episode of NXT, Evans was thinking about what he should do next when he was approached by WWE Hall of Famer The Undertaker, who said that Evans should "go after the biggest dog in the yard". The following week, Evans discussed Undertaker's advice when he was interrupted by Williams, who thought Evans was there to challenge him, however, Evans revealed he had come to challenge Femi. Williams felt disrespected, stating it would only be a matter of time before he defeated Femi and become a double champion. After that, they were interrupted by Williams's allies The High Ryze (Wes Lee, Tyson DuPont, and Tyriek Igwe) and after some exchange of words, Evans attacked Lee, but was outnumbered by Williams and High Ryze. Later that night, Evans defeated Lee, and after that, Williams, Evans, and Femi confronted each other. The following week, Femi stated that no one was worthy of facing him for the championship before being interrupted by Williams and Evans, with Evans proposing that he and Williams should face each other to determine who would challenge for the NXT Championship, with Femi stating that the match should happen on that night's episode. Williams declined, preferring it take place on the August 19 episode. It was later confirmed by NXT General Manager Ava, who also announced that the winner would face Femi at Heatwave. The match was won by Evans.

For months, DarkState (Dion Lennox, Osiris Griffin, Saquon Shugars, and Cutler James) had been attacking several wrestlers, including NXT Tag Team Champions Hank and Tank (Hank Walker and Tank Ledger). On the June 24 episode of NXT, Hank and Tank were attacked backstage by unknown assailants. A month later on the August 5 episode, Hank and Tank were attacked by DarkState after their successful title defense. Later that night, DarkState revealed that they were the ones who attacked Hank and Tank the prior month, while Hank and Tank demanded a match against any two members of DarkState. NXT General Manager Ava then announced that Hank and Tank would defend their title against two members of DarkState at Heatwave.

On the June 26 episode of Impact!, Ash by Elegance (who previously wrestled in WWE as Dana Brooke) won a battle royal to become the #1 contender for Masha Slamovich's TNA Knockouts World Championship. A month later at TNA's Slammiversary, NXT Women's Champion Jacy Jayne defeated Slamovich in a Winner Takes All match, leaving with both titles. On the following episode of Impact!, Slamovich was granted by TNA Director of Authority Santino Marella a rematch for the TNA Knockouts World Championship the following week, while later that night during Fatal Influence's (Jayne, Fallon Henley, and Jazmyn Nyx) celebration, Jayne mocked the entire TNA women's division, including The Elegance Brand (Ash, Heather by Elegance, and M by Elegance). The following week during Slamovich's rematch, Ash attacked her, costing Slamovich the match. On the August 7 episode, Ash had her championship match, where Fatal Influence and The Elegance Brand were banned from ringside. However, Slamovich attacked Ash, also costing her the match, and a brawl subsequently broke out between Slamovich, The Elegance Brand, and Fatal Influence. On the August 12 episode of NXT, both Ash and Slamovich were in the crowd watching Henley and Nyx's tag team match, and later that night, NXT General Manager Ava announced that after speaking with Marella, Jayne would defend the TNA Knockouts World Championship against Ash and Slamovich in a triple threat match at Heatwave.

At TNA's Slammiversary, a Winner Takes All match was scheduled for both the NXT Women's Championship and TNA Knockouts World Championship, with both Jaida Parker and Lash Legend making it clear that they would be coming after the winner. At the event, Jacy Jayne won the match, retaining the NXT Women's Championship while winning the TNA Knockouts World Championship. Three days later on NXT during Fatal Influence (Jayne, Jazmyn Nyx, and Fallon Henley) celebration, they were interrupted by both Legend and Parker. After some exchange of words, Fatal Influence brawled with Legend and Parker, with the latter two getting the upper hand. After that, both Legend and Parker confronted each other. On the following episode, Parker defeated Nyx, and later, Henley defeated Legend. During this time, Kelani Jordan and Lola Vice also stated their intentions of challenging for the NXT Women's Championship, and Jordan and Vice would defeat Jayne and Henley in a tag team match on the August 12 episode. After the end of the show in a video posted on X, it was revealed that earlier in the show, Parker, Jordan, and Vice argued about who should challenge for the NXT Women's Championship, with NXT General Manager Ava announcing that a triple threat match between Parker, Jordan, and Vice would be held at Heatwave to determine the #1 contender for the championship.

On the July 22 episode of NXT, Ethan Page debuted a custom version of his NXT North American Championship, which depicted the flag of his native Canada. Two weeks later, Page cut a promo saying Canada was superior to America before being interrupted by Tavion Heights. SmackDown's The Green Regime (Chelsea Green, Alba Fyre, and Piper Niven) subsequently appeared, with Green siding with fellow countryman Page. On the next episode, Heights introduced Tyra Mae Steele as his tag team partner, who attacked Page and The Green Regime. On the August 19 episode, Page and Green attempted to foster a peace treaty between both Canada and America, only to argue with Heights and Steele over the two countries. After that, NXT General Manager Ava announced that the two teams would face each other in a mixed tag team match at Heatwave.

== Event ==
Other on-screen personnel
Role:	Name:
Commentators	Vic Joseph
Commentators	Booker T
Spanish commentators	Marcelo Rodríguez
Spanish commentators	Jerry Soto
Ring announcer	Mike Rome
Referees	Adrian Butler
Referees	Victoria D'Errico
Referees	Chip Danning
Referees	Dallas Irvin
Referees	Derek Sanders
Referees	Felix Fernandez
Interviewers	Kelly Kincaid
Interviewers	Sarah Schreiber
Interviewers	Blake Howard
Interviewers	Andrea Bazarte
Pre-show panel	Megan Morant
Pre-show panel	Sam Roberts

=== Preliminary matches ===
The PLE began with the triple threat match between Jaida Parker, Kelani Jordan, and Lola Vice to determine the number one contender for the NXT Women's Championship. The ending saw Parker perform Hipnotic on Jordan before Vice rolled up Parker to win the match. Vice's title match was later confirmed for No Mercy.

On the second match, Hank and Tank (Hank Walker and Tank Ledger) unsuccessfully defended the NXT Tag-Team Championship against DarkState (Dion Lennox and Osiris Griffin). After some distractions on the outside, DarkState managed to pin the champs and win for the first time the tag-team titles.

On the third match, Jacy Jayne defended the TNA Knockouts Championship against Ash by Elegance and Masha Slamovich in a Triple Threat match. Jacy Jayne used The Rolling Encore punch on Slamovich and Jayne pinned Slamovich until The Elegance Brand pulled Jayne out of the ring and Ash performed the Rarefied Air on Slamovich and pinned her for the three count to win the TNA Knockouts Championship.

On the fourth match, Blake Monroe faced Jordynne Grace. Monroe exposed Grace into the exposed steel and delivered Grace into The Curb Stomp. In the end, Monroe connected with the Double Underhook DDT on Grace to pick up the victory.

The fifth match saw Chelsea Green and Ethan Page take on Tavion Heights and Tyra Mae Steele. Steele applied the ankle lock on Page, but the referee admonished Steele because Page was not the legal competitor. Heights and Page were brawling outside of the ring. Alba Fyre superkicked Steele behind the referee's back and Green performed the Unprettier to pick up the victory.

=== Main event ===
In the main event of the show, Oba Femi defended his NXT Championship against Je'Von Evans. Evans kicked Femi in the back, Femi sent Evans crashing into the referee, Evans ducked the clothesline from Femi, used The Leaping Cutter and connected with The Double Jump Cutter for a two count. A second referee slid into the ring and made the three count, but the original referee saw Femi's foot under the bottom rope. Evans argued with referee Derek Sanders. Femi delivered The Toss Powerbomb through the announce table. Femi rolled Evans back into the ring, and planted Evans with The Fall From Grace to pick up the victory. After the match, Femi had a standoff with Ricky Saints as the show went off the air.

== Aftermath ==
Ricky Saints opened the following episode of NXT to call out NXT Champion Oba Femi. Josh Briggs interrupted, wanting his own shot at the title. NXT General Manager Ava scheduled a match between them to determine the number one contender for the title at No Mercy, which was won by Saints.

Also on NXT, Jordynne Grace cost Blake Monroe a match. After Grace won her match the following week, she and Monroe engaged in a brawl. They were eventually scheduled for a weaponized Steel Cage match at No Mercy.

DarkState (Dion Lennox and Osiris Griffin) talked about their NXT Tag Team Championship win and soon engaged in a brawl with Hank and Tank (Hank Walker and Tank Ledger). Later that night, NXT General Manager Ava scheduled an eight-man tag team match pitting Hank and Tank and two other members against DarkState for next week. which Hank and Tank, along with Ricky Saints and Oba Femi, won after interference by Joe Hendry. On the September 9 episode, DarkState retained the title against Hank and Tank in a rematch.

Tyra Mae Steele defeated Alba Fyre after preventing Ethan Page from interfering. After the match, Page took out Tavion Heights and draped the Canadian flag over him. On the September 9 episode, Heights defeated Page in a flag match. After the match, Heights draped the Canadian flag over Page before the returning Tyler Breeze took a picture of himself and Page.

Lola Vice teamed with Zaria and Sol Ruca to defeated Fatal Influence (NXT Women's Champion Jacy Jayne, Fallon Henley, and Jazmyn Nyx) in a six-woman tag team match with Vice pinning Henley.

=== Broadcasting changes ===
In continuing WWE's near worldwide transition to Netflix, this would be the final Heatwave to air on Disney+ in the Philippines before moving to Netflix on January 1, 2026. Throughout 2025, many of the select few countries that were still on the WWE Network due to pre-existing contracts gradually merged to Netflix with nearly all international markets on Netflix by January 1, 2026. The last few remaining countries that were still on the WWE Network merged under Netflix on April 1, 2026, making this 2025 event the last Heatwave to air on the WWE Network in any country. Additionally, this was the final Heatwave to air on Peacock in the United States, as The CW acquired the rights to broadcast NXT's PLEs in April 2026, and then that August, all of NXT's programming also began simulcasting on ESPN Unlimited.

== Results ==
No.	Results	Stipulations	Times
1	Lola Vice defeated Jaida Parker and Kelani Jordan by pinfall	Triple threat match to determine the #1 contender for the NXT Women's Championship	11:53
2	DarkState (Dion Lennox and Osiris Griffin) (with Cutler James and Saquon Shugars) defeated Hank and Tank (Hank Walker and Tank Ledger) (c) by pinfall	Tag team match for the NXT Tag Team Championship	10:16
3	Ash by Elegance (with Heather by Elegance, M by Elegance, and The Personal Concierge) defeated Jacy Jayne (c) (with Fallon Henley and Jazmyn Nyx) and Masha Slamovich by pinfall	Triple threat match for the TNA Knockouts World Championship	12:19
4	Blake Monroe defeated Jordynne Grace by pinfall	Singles match	12:47
5	Ethan Page and Chelsea Green (with Alba Fyre and Piper Niven) defeated Tavion Heights and Tyra Mae Steele by pinfall	Mixed tag team match	9:30
6	Oba Femi (c) defeated Je'Von Evans by pinfall	Singles match for the NXT Championship	17:43
(c) / – the champion(s) heading into the match
