= Je'Von Evans =

American professional wrestler (born 2004)

- Evans in 2026

Personal information
- Born: Malachi Jeffers; April 29, 2004 (age 22) Greensboro, North Carolina, U.S.
- Relative: B-Fab (cousin)

Professional wrestling career
- Ring name(s): Je'Von Evans; Jay Malachi; Kid Blacka Merica
- Billed height: 6 ft 5 in (1.96 m)
- Billed weight: 180 lb (82 kg)
- Billed from: Greensboro, North Carolina
- Trained by: FSPW Academy; LaBron Kozone; New Jack
- Debut: January 26, 2018

Malachi Jeffers (born April 29, 2004) is an American professional wrestler. As of November 2023, he is signed to WWE, where he performs on the Raw brand under the ring name Je'Von Evans and is one-half of the World Tag Team Champions alongside Penta in their first reign.

He previously wrestled under the ring name Jay Malachi on the independent circuit, including for Deadlock Pro-Wrestling (DPW), where he won the DPW Worlds Championship, as well as Game Changer Wrestling (GCW) and West Coast Pro Wrestling (WCPW).

== Early life ==
Malachi Jeffers was born in Greensboro, North Carolina. He attended The College Prep and Leadership Academy in Jamestown, where he played basketball and graduated in 2022.

== Professional wrestling career ==
=== Early career (2018–2023) ===
Jeffers began training for a professional wrestling career under LaBron Kozone at the Fire Star Pro Wrestling (FSPW) Academy, becoming the youngest graduate at age 14. He made his in-ring debut in a tag team match on January 26, 2018, under the ring name Kid Blacka Merica, teaming with Captain Blacka Merica to defeat Kevin Ramage and Ty Land. In January 2019, he changed his ring name to Jay Malachi and formed a tag team with Jackson Drake known as the Wrestling Prodigies. During his tenure with FSPW, he held the FSPW Heavyweight Championship, FSPW South Eastern Championship, and the FSPW Tag Team Championship. He also wrestled regularly for the Premier Wrestling Federation (PWF), where he and Drake held the PWF Tag Team Championship twice in 2021.

On March 30, 2023, Malachi appeared for Game Changer Wrestling (GCW) at For the Culture 4, teaming with The World (A.C. Mack, J.C. Storm, Jeffrey John and Suge D) in a loss to West Coast (Alpha Zo, G. Sharpe, Kenny King, Mazzerati and Midas Kreed). On July 1, he defeated Drake to become the number one contender for the PWF Undisputed Championship. The following month, he took part in West Coast Pro Wrestling (WCPW)'s West Coast Cup tournament, defeating Viento in the first round, before losing to Starboy Charlie in the quarterfinals. On October 22, he failed to win the PWF Undisputed Championship from Bojack.

=== Deadlock Pro-Wrestling (2022–2023) ===
Malachi made his debut for Deadlock Pro-Wrestling (DPW) on March 12, 2022. He unsuccessfully challenged Bojack for the DPW Worlds Championship on September 24. On April 16, 2023, he defeated Alec Price and Drake in a triple threat match for the Golden Opportunity, granting him a future match for the title. On September 17, Malachi defeated Jake Something, Mike Bailey and Tom Lawlor in a fatal four-way match to win the Carolina Classic, and then defeated Lucky Ali in a Carolina Warfare match to win the DPW Worlds Championship. After successfully defending the title against Jordan Oliver on October 15 and Price on November 12, he vacated it on November 18 upon signing with WWE.

=== All Elite Wrestling (2022, 2023) ===
On August 21, 2022, Malachi made his All Elite Wrestling (AEW) debut in a match taped for AEW Dark, where he lost to Fuego Del Sol. He returned on January 28, 2023, teaming with Oliver Sawyer in a loss to the WorkHorseMen (Anthony Henry and JD Drake). In his last appearance, on February 26, Malachi, Sawyer and Jackson Drake lost to Jay Lethal, Jeff Jarrett and Satnam Singh in a six-man tag team match.

=== WWE (2023–present) ===
==== NXT (2023–2025) ====
Prior to signing with the company, Jeffers participated in a WWE tryout in September 2023. On November 14, he was reported to have signed with WWE and was assigned to the NXT brand under the ring name Je'Von Evans. He made his debut on the April 9, 2024 episode of NXT, defeating Scrypts. The following week, he lost to then-NXT Champion Ilja Dragunov, but was endorsed by Dragunov after the match, as the two shook hands. On the June 18 episode of NXT, Evans won a 25-man battle royal for an NXT Championship match against Trick Williams at NXT Heatwave on July 7. However, the match turned into a fatal-four way match involving Ethan Page and Shawn Spears, which Evans lost. At NXT Deadline on December 7, he participated in the Men's Iron Survivor Challenge, which was won by Oba Femi.

Heading into 2025, Evans feuded with Page, whom he lost to at NXT Vengeance Day on February 15, but defeated in a New York City street fight at NXT: Roadblock on March 11. He then unsuccessfully challenged for the NXT Championship in a triple threat match on April 19 at NXT Stand & Deliver and the NXT North American Championship in a fatal four-way match on June 7 at Worlds Collide. He also appeared on the May 30 episode of SmackDown, teaming with Rey Fénix in a loss to Legado Del Fantasma's Los Garza (Angel and Berto). After defeating Jasper Troy at NXT The Great American Bash on July 12, Evans defeated Williams to become the number one contender for the NXT Championship at NXT Heatwave on August 24, but lost to Femi. On the September 26 episode of SmackDown, Evans answered Sami Zayn's United States Championship open challenge in a losing effort. The next night, at NXT No Mercy, he defeated Josh Briggs.

Evans then began teaming with TNA X Division Champion Leon Slater, defeating Lucha Libre AAA Worldwide (AAA)’s Mr. Iguana and La Parka at NXT Halloween Havoc on October 26. They failed to win the NXT Tag Team Championship from DarkState (Dion Lennox and Osiris Griffin) at Week 1 of NXT: Gold Rush on November 18. At NXT Deadline on December 6, John Cena selected Evans as one of the Men's Iron Survivor Challenge participants, where Evans won the match to earn an NXT Championship match against Femi at NXT: New Year's Evil. On the following episode of NXT, Evans demanded his title match immediately, but lost after interference from Ricky Saints. At Saturday Night's Main Event XLII on December 13, Evans and Slater were selected by Cena in his final event to face World Tag Team Champions AJ Styles and Dragon Lee in a non-title match, which they lost. At Guerra de Titanes ("War of the Titans") on December 20, Evans faced Laredo Kid and Jack Cartwheel in a triple threat match for the AAA World Cruiserweight Championship, after having previously won a contendership match against Axiom and Octagon Jr. on November 22, but failed to win the title. On the December 30 episode of NXT, Evans lost to Saints in his final match for NXT.

==== Raw (2026–present) ====
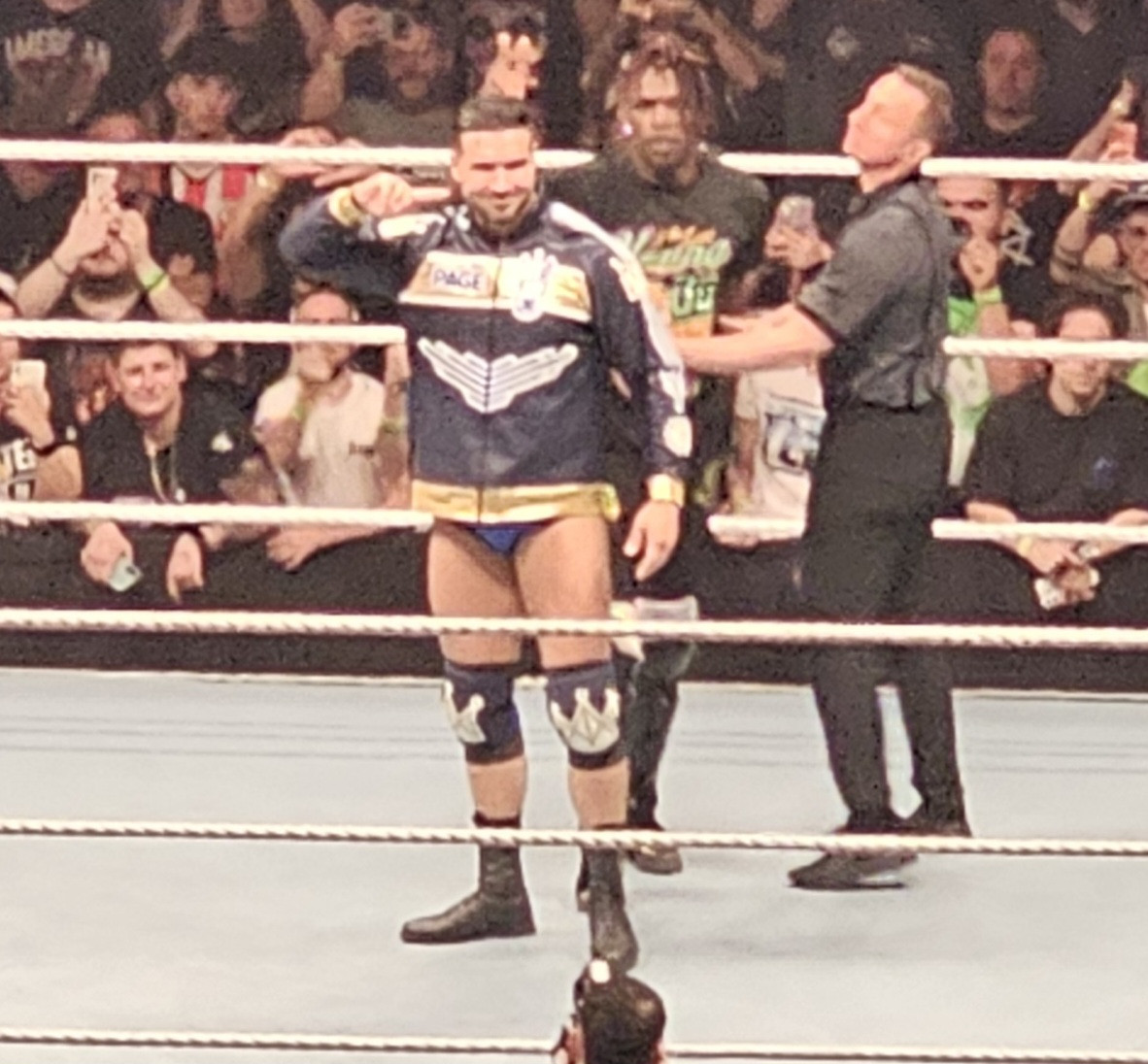
Evans in the ring behind Ethan Page in June 2026

At Raw on Netflix Anniversary Show on January 5, 2026, Evans officially signed with the Raw brand. Evans defeated Bravo Americano in his first match on the brand on the January 12 episode of Raw. The following week, Evans lost to El Grande Americano by referee's decision after sustaining an injury, but was later medically cleared.

On January 31, at Royal Rumble, Evans made his men's Royal Rumble match debut at number 8, lasting 41 minutes before being eliminated by Randy Orton. On the February 16 episode of Raw, Evans defeated Gunther and Dominik Mysterio in a triple threat match to qualify for the Elimination Chamber match at the namesake event, where he got eliminated by Logan Paul. At WrestleMania 42 Night 2 on April 19, he unsuccessfully challenged for Penta's Intercontinental Championship in a ladder match. On September 14, Je'Von won a triple threat on Raw in Mexico City, defeating Big Cass and Austin Theory to qualify for Money in the Bank ladder match. At the event on October 10, Evans failed to win the match as it was won by Penta. On the October 26 episode of Raw, Evans received his first world title match where he faced Sami Zayn for the Undisputed WWE Championship but failed to win the title after interference from Bron Breakker. Following this, Evans and Penta demanded a World Tag Team Championship match against The Vision (Breakker and Austin Theory), which was made official by Raw general manager Adam Pearce for Crown Jewel. At the event on November 7, Evans and Penta defeated The Vision after assistance from Oba Femi to win the titles marking Evans' first championship win in WWE.

=== Total Nonstop Action Wrestling (2025) ===
At Total Nonstop Action Wrestling (TNA)'s Victory Road event on September 26, 2025, it was announced that Evans would face Leon Slater for the TNA X Division Championship on October 12 at Bound for Glory, but the match ended in a no contest after DarkState (Dion Lennox, Cutler James, Saquon Shugars, and Osiris Griffin) attacked both Evans and Slater.

== Professional wrestling style ==
As Jay Malachi and Je'Von Evans, Jeffers has been noted for his athleticism and high-flying style. He was described by WWE as having "jaw-dropping athleticism", "fearless confidence", and a "high-octane style". His finishing maneuver is a double springboard cutter known as the "OG Cutter" in WWE and the "Mala-cutter" on the independent circuit, the former being a reference to his nickname, the "Young OG".

== Personal life ==
Jeffers is the cousin of fellow professional wrestler Brianna Brandy, also known by her ring name B-Fab.

== Championships and accomplishments ==
- Deadlock Pro-Wrestling
  - DPW Worlds Championship (1 time)
  - Carolina Classic (2023)
- Fire Star Pro Wrestling
  - FSPW Heavyweight Championship (1 time)
  - FSPW South Eastern Championship (1 time)
  - FSPW Tag Team Championship (1 time) – with Jackson Drake
- Premier Wrestling Federation
  - PWF Tag Team Championship (2 times) – with Jackson Drake
- Pro Wrestling Illustrated
  - Ranked No. 41 of the top 500 singles wrestlers in the PWI 500 in 2026
- Wrestling Observer Newsletter
  - Rookie of the Year (2024)
- WWE
  - World Tag Team Championship (1 time, current) – with Penta
  - Men's Iron Survivor Challenge (2025)
  - NXT Year-End Award (2 times)
    - Male Superstar of the Year (2025)
    - Match of the Year (2025) – vs. Oba Femi and Trick Williams at NXT Stand & Deliver
