= WWE Evolution (2025) =

Women's professional wrestling premium live event

Evolution
- Promotional poster featuring various WWE wrestlers
- Promotion: WWE
- Brand(s): Raw; SmackDown; NXT
- Date: July 13, 2025
- City: Atlanta, Georgia
- Venue: State Farm Arena
- Attendance: 8,351

WWE event chronology
← Previous; Saturday Night's Main Event XL	Next → SummerSlam

Evolution chronology
← Previous; 2018	Next → —

The 2025 Evolution was a women's professional wrestling premium live event (PLE) produced by WWE, held for wrestlers from the promotion's Raw, SmackDown, and NXT brand divisions. It was the second Evolution, and subsequently WWE's second all-womens PLE, after the inaugural 2018 event seven years prior. The event took place on Sunday, July 13, 2025, at the State Farm Arena in Atlanta, Georgia.

Seven matches were contested at the event. In the main event, SmackDown's Naomi defeated Rhea Ripley and defending champion Iyo Sky to win Raw's Women's World Championship; this originally started as a singles match between Sky and Ripley, however, Naomi cashed in her Money in the Bank contract during the match, making it a triple threat match, with Naomi subsequently transferred to Raw upon her win. Earlier on the card in a featured match from SmackDown, Naomi had lost a No Holds Barred match to Jade Cargill, which featured Bianca Belair as the special guest referee. In other prominent matches, Tiffany Stratton defeated WWE Hall of Famer Trish Stratus to retain SmackDown's WWE Women's Championship, Becky Lynch retained Raw's WWE Women's Intercontinental Championship against Lyra Valkyria and Bayley in a triple threat match, Jacy Jayne retained the NXT Women's Championship against Jordynne Grace, and Raw's Stephanie Vaquer won the Evolution Battle Royal to earn a match for her brand's Women's World Championship; the title match was originally slated to take place at Clash in Paris, however, it was rescheduled for Wrestlepalooza due to Naomi vacating the championship after going on maternity leave.

This was the first Evolution and the first all-women's professional wrestling event to broadcast on Peacock in the United States, Disney+ in the Philippines, Abema in Japan, and Netflix in most other international markets. It was also the first Evolution to be branded as a "premium live event", a term the company introduced at the start of 2022 to refer to its events airing on traditional pay-per-view and via WWE's livestreaming platforms. Excluding the two-night WrestleMania, this was also WWE's first main roster PLE to take place on a Sunday since Hell in a Cell in June 2022.

== Production ==
=== Background ===
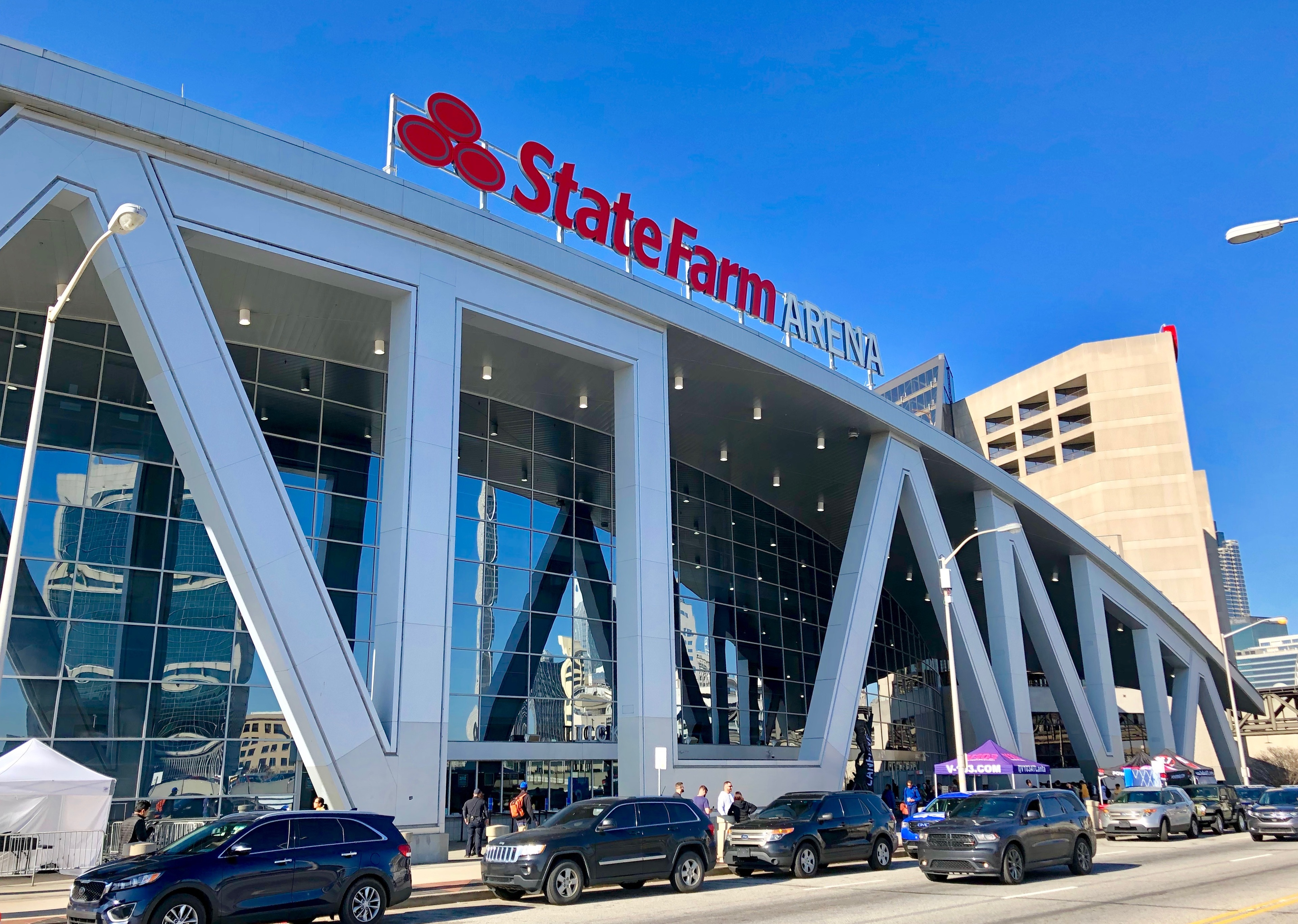
The second Evolution was held at the State Farm Arena in Atlanta, Georgia.

In October 2018, the American professional wrestling promotion WWE held an all-women's professional wrestling event called Evolution. This was WWE's first pay-per-view (PPV) and livestreaming event to consist solely of women's matches and featured women from all of WWE's brand divisions at the time: Raw, SmackDown, NXT, and NXT UK, the latter of which was dissolved in 2022. Over the next few years, there had been various comments from people within WWE on a potential second Evolution event, with support from a number of WWE female performers.

Before wrestler Mickie James's release from WWE in April 2021, she had pushed for the company to produce another all-female event as well as an all-female brand, but said she was "cut off at every opportunity". She claimed an unnamed WWE official told her that "women's wrestling doesn't make money" and that Evolution was the company's "lowest-rated pay-per-view ever in the history of WWE pay-per-views". In June 2021, former WWE wrestler Maria Kanellis also stated that former Head of WWE Talent Relations, Mark Carano, informed her that there would not be another all-female event, although in a conference call that same month, WWE Chief Content Officer Paul "Triple H" Levesque said that a second Evolution was possible, "but it's not a must-have at the moment".

After another few years, a report emerged on March 6, 2025, that WWE was in fact planning to hold a second Evolution event. Bodyslam.net stated that the company was aiming to hold the event on July 5, 2025, at the Mohegan Sun Arena in Uncasville, Connecticut, but noted that while the event was in the works, the schedule was tentative. On May 12, 2025, a new report from PWInsider stated that the company was now looking to hold the event a week later from Atlanta, Georgia during the same weekend as Saturday Night's Main Event XL. WWE then confirmed this with an announcement during Saturday Night's Main Event XXXIX on May 24, with the second all-women's Evolution event scheduled for Sunday, July 13 at Atlanta's State Farm Arena; Saturday Night's Main Event XL was held the day before at the same venue, while NXT held The Great American Bash on the afternoon of Saturday Night's Main Event at the nearby Center Stage.

This was the first Evolution to be branded as a "premium live event" (PLE), a term the company introduced on January 1, 2022, to refer to its events that are available on PPV and via livestreaming. Evolution was held on the same night as the third part of Beyoncé's Cowboy Carter Tour, emanating from the nearby Mercedes-Benz Stadium, which had caused concerns on attendance and viewership.

=== Broadcast outlets ===
The PLE was broadcast on traditional PPV outlets worldwide. It was also available to livestream on Peacock in the United States, SuperSport in Sub-Saharan Africa, Disney+ in the Philippines, Abema in Japan, Netflix in most other international markets, and the WWE Network in a select few countries that had not yet transferred to Netflix due to pre-existing contracts. This marked the first Evolution, and the first all-women's professional wrestling event, to livestream on Peacock, Disney+, Abema, and Netflix, following the WWE Network's merger under those services in April 2021, November 2022, October 2023, and January 2025, respectively.

=== Storylines ===
The event included seven matches that resulted from scripted storylines. Results were predetermined by WWE's writers on the Raw, SmackDown, and NXT brands, while storylines were produced on WWE's weekly television shows, Monday Night Raw, Friday Night SmackDown, and Tuesday night's NXT.

After Jacy Jayne successfully defended the NXT Women's Championship on the June 10 episode of NXT, NXT General Manager Ava announced that on the following episode, the NXT Women's Championship Evolution Eliminator would begin. This consisted of four matches, with each winner advancing to a fatal four-way match on the June 24 episode, where the winner of that match would face Jayne for the championship at Evolution. The fatal four-way was won by Jordynne Grace.

On the March 3 episode of Raw, Iyo Sky defeated Rhea Ripley to win the Women's World Championship. Ripley was then inserted into a triple threat match for the title on Night 2 of WrestleMania 41, where Sky retained. Over the next few months, Ripley set her sights on getting a rematch. After her victory at Night of Champions, Ripley opened the following episode of Raw, where she was confronted by Sky, who said that Raw General Manager Adam Pearce allowed her to defend her title at Evolution against an opponent of her choosing, with Sky subsequently choosing to defend the title against Ripley at the event.

On the June 16 episode of Raw, WWE Women's Tag Team Champion Liv Morgan suffered a legitimate dislocated shoulder during a match against Kairi Sane, which required surgery, ruling Morgan out of action for several months. Around this time, Roxanne Perez began inserting herself into Morgan's faction, The Judgment Day. On the June 30 episode of Raw, Judgment Day members Finn Bálor and JD McDonagh proposed to Raw General Manager Adam Pearce and SmackDown General Manager Nick Aldis to have Perez replace Morgan so that she and Raquel Rodriguez could defend the title. Pearce and Aldis agreed on one condition: Rodriguez and Perez had to defend the Women's Tag Team Championship at Evolution against one team from each brand in a fatal four-way tag team match. Bálor and McDonagh agreed and the match was made official. On the July 4 episode of SmackDown, Alexa Bliss and Charlotte Flair defeated Michin and B-Fab and The Secret Hervice (Alba Fyre and Piper Niven) to earn SmackDown's spot. On Raw the next week, NXT's team was announced as Sol Ruca and Zaria while on that same episode, Sane defeated Perez in a singles match, followed by a beatdown from Rodriguez and Perez. Asuka came to Sane's aid, reuniting The Kabuki Warriors. They were subsequently added to the match representing Raw.

At the original Evolution in 2018, a battle royal was held where the winner received a future women's world championship match. On the June 30 episode of Raw, Raw and SmackDown's General Managers, Adam Pearce and Nick Aldis, announced that the 2025 Evolution would also have a battle royal with the winner earning a title match at Clash in Paris.

During the July 4 episode of SmackDown, WWE Women's Champion Tiffany Stratton addressed her scheduled title defense at SummerSlam against Queen of the Ring winner Jade Cargill. Stratton then revealed she would also defend her title at Evolution, and that she was allowed to choose her opponent. After Cargill interrupted, Stratton stated that she had a surprise, prompting WWE Hall of Famer Trish Stratus to come out, who Stratton had previously teamed with and was victorious with at Elimination Chamber in March. Stratton said that she wanted to defend her title against Stratus at Evolution, which Stratus accepted.

On the November 22, 2024, episode of SmackDown, Jade Cargill was found attacked backstage by an unknown assailant, ruling her out of action indefinitely. During Cargill's absence, Naomi volunteered to replace Cargill as one-half of the WWE Women's Tag Team Champions alongside Bianca Belair. Naomi and Belair assumed that Liv Morgan and Raquel Rodriguez, whom they were feuding with at the time, were responsible for the attack as they launched their own investigation. This led to a title match between the two teams on the February 24, 2025, episode of Raw, where Naomi and Belair lost the title. Shortly after, both Naomi and Belair qualified for the women's Elimination Chamber match at the namesake event. Before the match began, Cargill made a surprise return and attacked Naomi, who was rendered medically unable to compete in the match. On the following episode of SmackDown, Naomi revealed herself as Cargill's attacker and said she regretted not attacking her sooner, turning heel for the first time since 2016. This led to a match between Cargill and Naomi on Night 1 of WrestleMania 41, which Cargill won. Their rivalry continued after the event, with Cargill defeating Naomi in a tag team match, and Naomi defeating Cargill in a triple threat qualifying match for a spot in the Money in the Bank ladder match, which Naomi subsequently won. After Naomi attacked Cargill on the July 4 episode of SmackDown with her Money in the Bank briefcase, a No Holds Barred match between the two was scheduled for Evolution. After a brawl between the two during Saturday Night's Main Event XL, SmackDown General Manager Nick Aldis announced that Belair would be the special guest referee for the match.

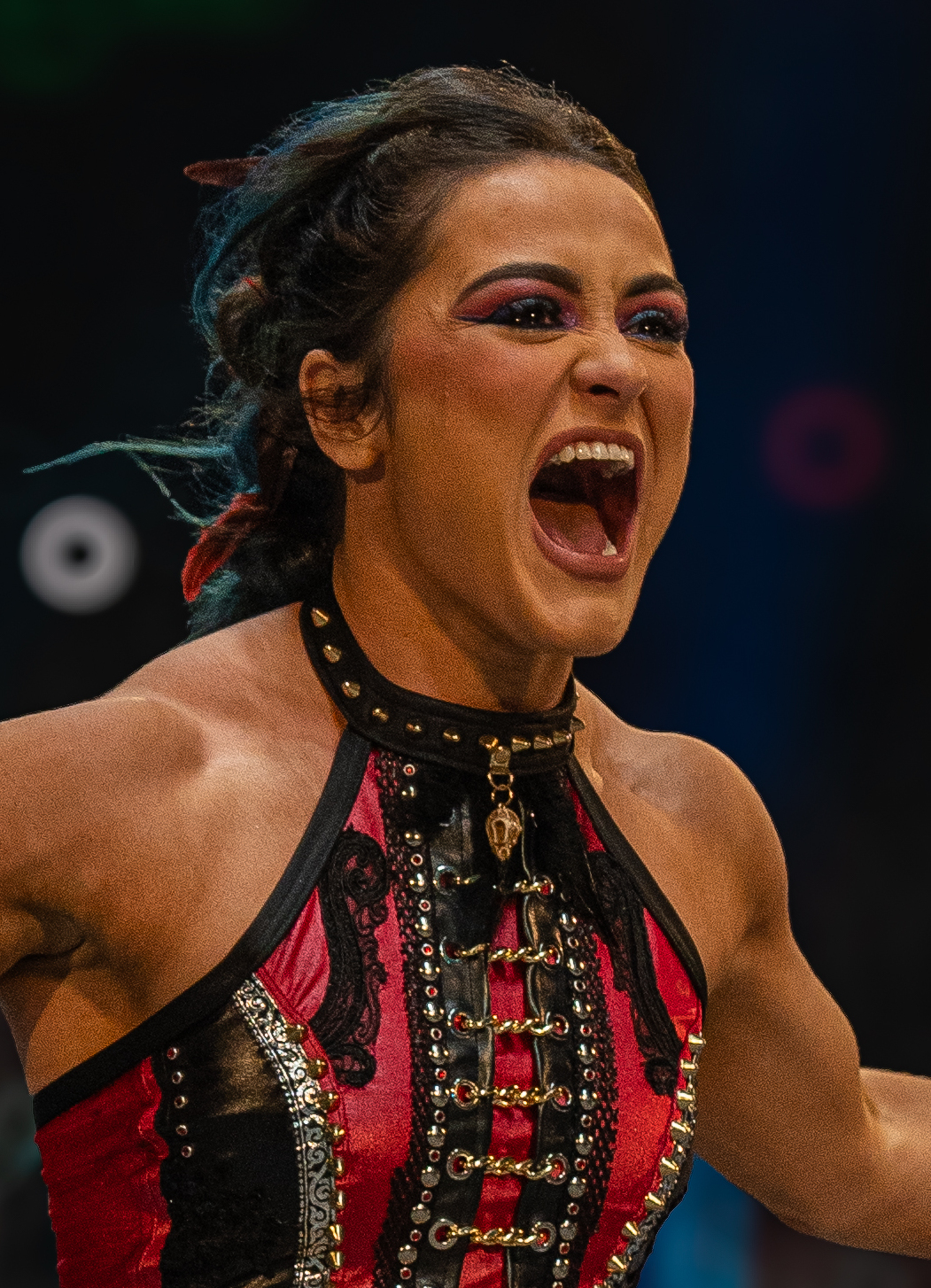
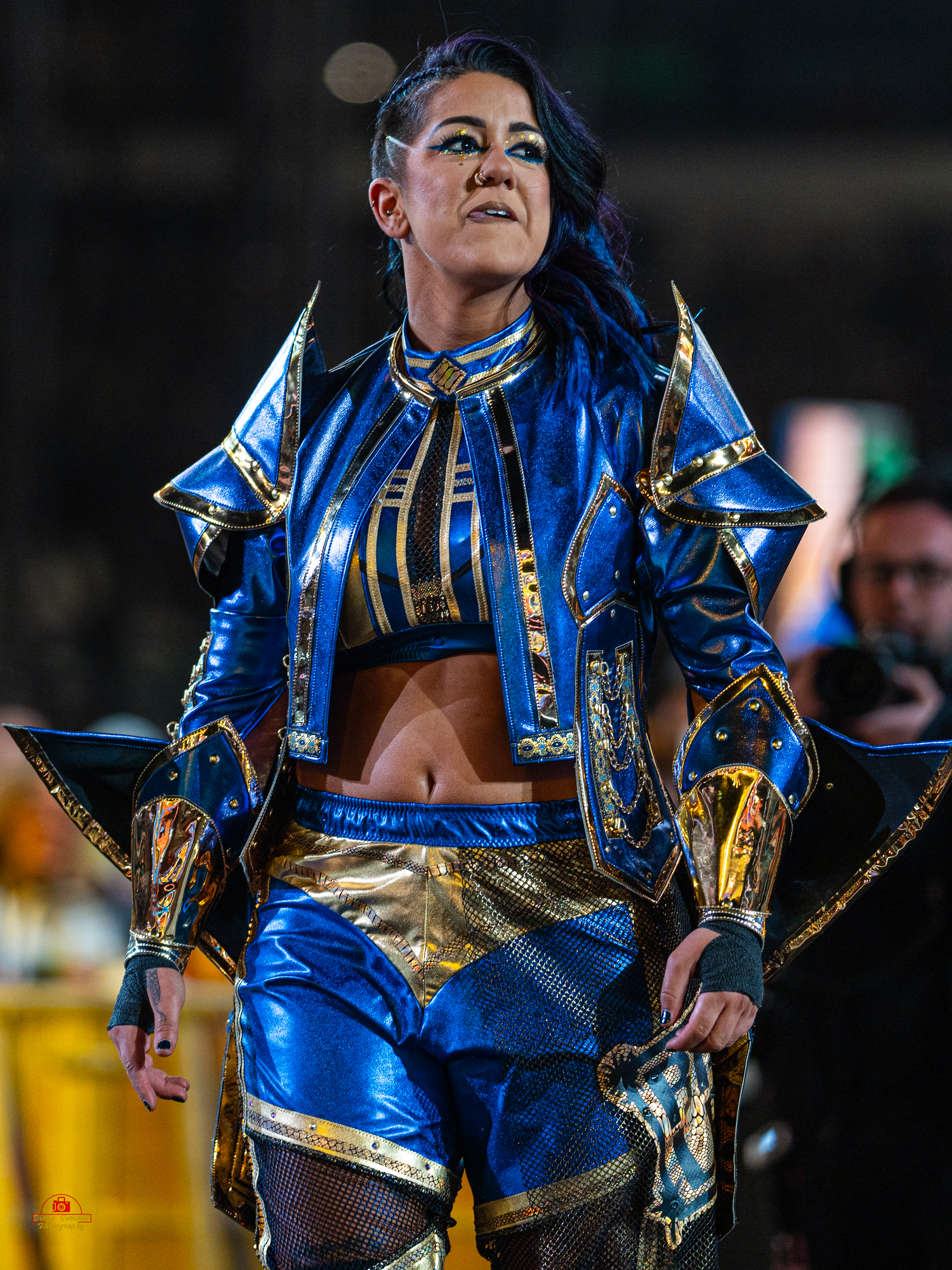
In the opening bout, Becky Lynch defended Raw's WWE Women's Intercontinental Championship against Lyra Valkyria and Bayley in a triple threat match.

On Night 2 of WrestleMania 41, Bayley was scheduled to team with Lyra Valkyria to challenge for the WWE Women's Tag Team Championship; however, on Night 1, Bayley was attacked backstage by an unknown assailant. Valkyria had to choose a new partner, who was revealed to be a returning Becky Lynch and they won the title only to lose it the next night on Raw. This infuriated Lynch, who turned on and attacked Valkyria, subsequently revealing that she had attacked Bayley. This led to a match at Backlash for Valkyria's WWE Women's Intercontinental Championship where she retained, but in a rematch at Money in the Bank, Lynch defeated her in a Last Chance match to win the title. Their feud would continue over the next few weeks which saw Bayley return and attack Lynch and also set her sights on the Women's Intercontinental Championship, much to Valkyria's dismay, who was also upset with Bayley for not speaking to her since Lynch's attack. Things got worse on the June 23 episode of Raw, where Bayley faced Lynch for the title. Valkyria tried to help Bayley, but after being attacked by Lynch, Valkyria retaliated, inadvertently causing Lynch to win by disqualification, thus retaining the title. Bayley and Valkyria then faced each other the following week to determine who would challenge Lynch for the title, but the match ended in a double pinfall, leading to a brawl between the two. On July 6, Raw General Manager Adam Pearce announced that Lynch would defend the title against Bayley and Valkyria in a triple threat match at Evolution.

==== Cancelled match ====
On the June 9 episode of Raw, WWE began teasing a match involving Liv Morgan and WWE Hall of Famer Nikki Bella, which was reportedly going to happen at Evolution, either as a singles match or a Women's Tag Team Championship match with Morgan and Raquel Rodriguez defending against The Bella Twins if WWE and Nikki's sister Brie Bella could work out a deal. However, Morgan suffered a legitimate dislocated shoulder in a match against Kairi Sane the following week, scrapping all plans for Morgan at the event, causing WWE to effectively rewrite the entire show. Nikki was in turn entered into the Evolution Battle Royal.

== Event ==
Other on-screen personnel
Role:	Name:
Hosts	Joe Tessitore
Hosts	Stephanie McMahon
English commentators	Michael Cole
English commentators	Wade Barrett
Spanish commentators	Marcelo Rodríguez
Spanish commentators	Jerry Soto
Ring announcer	Alicia Taylor
Referees	Bianca Belair
Referees	Jessika Carr
Referees	Victoria D'Errico
Referees	Daphanie LaShaunn
Interviewers	Cathy Kelley
Interviewers	Megan Morant
Pre-show panel	Michael Cole
Pre-show panel	Wade Barrett
Pre-show panel	Jackie Redmond
Pre-show panel	Big E

=== Preliminary matches ===
The PLE began with Becky Lynch defending Raw's Women's Intercontinental Championship against Lyra Valkyria and Bayley in a triple threat match. During the match, Lynch performed a Manhandle Slam on Valkyria, but Bayley broke up the pin. Valkyria then broke up a pinning attempt by Bayley on Lynch after a Bayley-to-Belly. Valkyria then performed Nightwing on Lynch, but Bayley broke up the pin. The ending of the match saw Bayley attempt to pin Valkyria following Rose Plant, but Lynch pinned Bayley with a roll-up to retain the title.

The second match was Jacy Jayne defending her NXT Women's Championship (with Fallon Henley and Jazmyn Nyx) against Jordynne Grace (accompanied by Blake Monroe). Henley and Nyx attacked Grace with the referee distracted. Jayne performed a middle-rope neckbreaker on Grace for a nearfall. As Jayne had the title belt in hand, Grace rolled up Jayne for a nearfall. With Henley distracting the referee, Monroe struck Grace with the title belt, allowing Jayne to pin Grace after Rolling Encore to retain the title. After the match, Monroe shoved the title back to Jayne.

During the Evolution broadcast, several Hall of Famers and legends were shown in the crowd, including Ivory, Jazz, Jacqueline, Molly Holly, Melina, Maryse, Alundra Blayze, Leilani Kai, Vickie Guerrero, Cherry, and Torrie Wilson.

After that, The Judgment Day (Raquel Rodriguez and Roxanne Perez) defended the WWE Women's Tag Team Championship against The Kabuki Warriors (Asuka and Kairi Sane), Alexa Bliss and Charlotte Flair, and Sol Ruca and Zaria in a fatal-four way tag team match. During the match, Flair performed a Spear on Perez for a nearfall. Later, Rodriguez performed a powerbomb on Bliss onto Asuka and Sane. Rodriguez then performed a Tejana Bomb on Ruca and pinned her to retain the title.

In the fourth match, Tiffany Stratton defended the WWE Women's Championship against WWE Hall of Famer Trish Stratus. As Stratton attempted the Prettiest Moonsault Ever, Stratus got her knees up and performed Stratusfaction on Stratton for a nearfall. In the end, Stratus attempted her own Moonsault, but Stratton got her knees up and pinned Stratus following an Alabama Slam and the Prettiest Moonsault Ever to retain the title.

After that, Jade Cargill faced Naomi in a No Holds Barred match with Bianca Belair as the special guest referee. Cargill placed a trash can on Naomi before kicking it. Cargill attempted to throw a toolbox on Naomi outside the ring, but Naomi avoided it and performed a dropkick on Cargill through the announce table. Naomi then struck Cargill with a chair, causing Cargill to go through a table outside the ring. In the end, while Naomi was on the middle rope, Cargill struck her with a chair. Cargill then performed Jaded from the top rope on Naomi through a table and pinned her to win the match.

The penultimate match was the battle royal for a women's title match at Clash in Paris. A notable moment included Kelani Jordan walking on her hands from the announce table to the ring apron. Near the end of the match, Lash Legend eliminated Nikki Bella, who was trying to eliminate Nia Jax. Stephanie Vaquer and Legend then eliminated Jax. With Vaquer and Legend on the apron, Vaquer performed the Devil's Kiss on Legend to eliminate her and earn a women's world championship match at Clash in Paris.

=== Main event ===
In the main event, Iyo Sky defended the Women's World Championship against Rhea Ripley. After an even match, Sky gained the upper hand following a tornado DDT, a suicide dive, and a top-rope dropkick. Sky then performed a double knee smash on Ripley into the turnbuckles for a nearfall. Sky attempted a Moonsault, but countered a suplex attempt by Ripley and landed on her feet. Sky then bounced Ripley neck first onto the top turnbuckle and attempted a double underhook DDT, but Ripley countered. After more counters, Sky performed a poisonrana on Ripley for a nearfall. Ripley prevented a Moonsault attempt by Sky and followed up with a Razor's Edge powerbomb followed by a sitout powerbomb for a nearfall. Ripley attempted Riptide, but Sky countered it into a sleeper hold. Sky countered a top-rope superplex and kicked Ripley off the ropes. Sky accidentally dropkicked the referee, and Ripley performed a Riptide on Sky, but there was no referee to make the count. Ripley then performed a Razor's Edge powerbomb on Sky and the two fought into the crowd, with Ripley getting the upper hand. Sky then performed a crossbody on Ripley from production crates. The fighting eventually returned to the ring, where Ripley sent Sky rib first into the announce table. As the referee recovered, Sky performed a Moonsault on Ripley for a nearfall. As Ripley attempted an Avalanche Riptide, Sky countered it into a Spanish Fly. Whilst both women were down, Naomi arrived and cashed in her Money in the Bank briefcase, making the singles match a triple threat match. Naomi then hit Sky with the briefcase, sent Ripley into the ring post, and pinned Sky following a split-legged moonsault to win the title.

== Reception ==
Dave Meltzer of the Wrestling Observer Newsletter rated the Women's Intercontinental Championship match 4.25 stars, the NXT Women's Championship match 3.25 stars, the Women's Tag Team Championship match 3.25 stars, the WWE Women's Championship match 3 stars, the No Holds Barred match 3.5 stars, the Battle Royal 3.25 stars, and the main event 4.75 stars.

== Aftermath ==
=== Raw ===
New Women's World Champion Naomi opened the following episode of Raw to talk about her Money in the Bank cash-in when Rhea Ripley interrupted. Ripley blamed Naomi for the reason she was not champion when Iyo Sky interrupted, vowing to get the title back from Naomi. Raw General Manager Adam Pearce then scheduled a triple threat match between the three for the title at SummerSlam. It was also confirmed that Evolution Battle Royal winner Stephanie Vaquer would challenge the winner at Clash in Paris, which was Naomi. However, on the August 18 episode of Raw, Naomi had to relinquish the title due to maternity leave as Naomi announced she was pregnant with her first child. The following week, Raw General Manager Adam Pearce announced that there would not be a match for the vacant Women's World Championship at Clash in Paris, and instead, Vaquer would challenge a to be announced opponent at a later date to determine the new champion. On the September 1 episode of Raw, it was announced that Vaquer would face Sky for the vacant title at Wrestlepalooza.

Also on Raw, WWE Women's Tag Team Champions Raquel Rodriguez and Roxanne Perez defeated The Kabuki Warriors (Asuka and Kairi Sane) in a non-title match. Nikki Bella defeated Chelsea Green before being attacked by Green's stablemates Piper Niven and Alba Fyre. Stephanie Vaquer would subsequently make the save for Bella.

Lyra Valkyria defeated Bayley in a two out of three falls match to earn another title match against Becky Lynch for the WWE Women's Intercontinental Championship at SummerSlam.

=== NXT ===
On July 3, WWE's partner promotion Total Nonstop Action Wrestling (TNA) announced that whoever won the NXT Women's Championship match at Evolution would face TNA Knockouts World Champion Masha Slamovich in a Winner Takes All match at TNA's Slammiversary event on July 20. Jayne's retention confirmed she would face Slamovich, and the two confronted each other on the NXT after Evolution.

After the fallout between Jordynne Grace and Blake Monroe, Grace gate-crashed the WWE Evolve Women's Championship match between Karmen Petrovic and champion Kali Armstrong by dumping both off the ring, causing a disqualification. With Monroe absent, Grace was invited to attend Monroe's singles debut against Wren Sinclair on the following episode of NXT.

=== SmackDown ===
On the following episode of SmackDown, ahead of Raquel Rodriguez and Roxanne Perez's defense of the WWE Women's Tag Team Championship against Charlotte Flair and Alexa Bliss at SummerSlam, Flair defeated Rodriguez with assistance from Bliss.

After eliminating WWE Women's United States Champion Giulia from the battle royal at Evolution, Zelina Vega faced Giulia for the title on the August 1 episode of SmackDown, where Giulia retained.

== Results ==
No.	Results	Stipulations	Times
1	Becky Lynch (c) defeated Bayley and Lyra Valkyria by pinfall	Triple threat match for the WWE Women's Intercontinental Championship	16:30
2	Jacy Jayne (c) (with Fallon Henley and Jazmyn Nyx) defeated Jordynne Grace (with Blake Monroe) by pinfall	Singles match for the NXT Women's Championship	10:30
3	The Judgment Day (Raquel Rodriguez and Roxanne Perez) (c) defeated Charlotte Flair and Alexa Bliss, Sol Ruca and Zaria, and The Kabuki Warriors (Asuka and Kairi Sane) by pinfall	Fatal four-way tag team match for the WWE Women's Tag Team Championship	10:50
4	Tiffany Stratton (c) defeated Trish Stratus by pinfall	Singles match for the WWE Women's Championship	8:30
5	Jade Cargill defeated Naomi by pinfall	No Holds Barred match Bianca Belair was the special guest referee.	11:10
6	Stephanie Vaquer won by last eliminating Lash Legend (Note: Order of elimination: Tatum Paxley, Izzi Dame, Ivy Nile, Natalya, Maxxine Dupri, Candice LeRae, Jaida Parker, Kelani Jordan, Giulia, B-Fab, Michin, Zelina Vega, Alba Fyre, Lola Vice, Piper Niven, Chelsea Green, Nikki Bella, Nia Jax, Lash Legend)	20-woman Evolution Battle Royal for a future world championship match (Note: The match was originally scheduled for Clash in Paris, but was postponed after the Women's World Championship was vacated as a result of Naomi's pregnancy.)	15:30
7	Naomi defeated Iyo Sky (c) and Rhea Ripley by pinfall (Note: The match originally started as a singles match between Sky and Ripley, however, Naomi cashed in her Money in the Bank contract while the match was in progress, converting it into a triple threat match.)	Triple threat match for the Women's World Championship; This was Naomi's Money in the Bank cash-in match.	26:20
(c) / – the champion(s) heading into the match

=== NXT Women's Championship Evolution Eliminator (2025) ===
1st Round; NXT; June 17, 2025
Jaida Parker	Pinfall
Thea Hail	9:15
Kelani Jordan	9:56
Lash Legend	Pinfall
Izzi Dame	Pinfall
Zaria	8:21
Jordynne Grace	Pinfall
Lola Vice	8:39

Final; NXT; June 24, 2025
Jaida Parker	12:49
Lash Legend	—
Izzi Dame	—
Jordynne Grace	Pinfall

Championship Match; Evolution; July 13, 2025
Jacy Jayne (c)	Pinfall
Jordynne Grace	10:30
