= Dion Lennox =

American professional wrestler (born 1998)

Personal information
- Born: Andrzej Hughes-Murray; January 16, 1998 (age 28) Federal Way, Washington, U.S.

Professional wrestling career
- Ring name(s): Dion Lennox; Andrzej Hughes-Murray
- Billed height: 6 ft 2 in (188 cm)
- Billed weight: 246 lb (112 kg)
- Debut: 2023

Andrzej Hughes-Murray (born January 16, 1998) is an American professional wrestler and former football player. He is signed to WWE, where he performs on the NXT brand under the ring name Dion Lennox and is a member of the DarkState stable. Lennox is a former two-time NXT Tag Team Champion.

Hughes-Murray previously played college football for the Oregon State Beavers and was signed to the Los Angeles Rams.

== Football career ==
Hughes-Murray played college football as a linebacker for the Oregon State Beavers for six seasons, missing the 2019 season due to injury. After being undrafted in the 2022 NFL draft, he signed a three-year contract with the Los Angeles Rams as an undrafted free agent, but was released prior to appearing in a game.

== Professional wrestling career ==
=== WWE (2023–present) ===
==== Early beginnings (2023–2024) ====
Hughes-Murray made his professional wrestling debut on August 19, 2023 at a NXT live event, losing to Joe Coffey. He made his NXT on-screen debut as Dion Lennox on the December 5 episode of NXT, where he was announced as a participant of the 2023 NXT Breakout Tournament. Lennox made his in-ring televised debut on the December 8 episode of NXT Level Up where he lost to Brooks Jensen. On the December 19 episode of NXT, Lennox lost to Lexis King in the first round of the NXT Breakout Tournament. Around October 2024, Lennox and Brinley Reece was involved in a love triangle storyline between Ashante "Thee" Adonis, Karmen Petrovic and Nikkita Lyons, where Adonis and Petrovic defeated Lennox and Reece in a mixed tag team match on the November 19 episode of NXT and culminated in a match between Lennox and Adonis on the December 24 episode of NXT won by Adonis after interference from Lyons.

==== DarkState (2025–present) ====
At NXT Vengeance Day on February 15, Lennox, along with Cutler James, Saquon Shugars, and Osiris Griffin, attacked Josh Briggs and Yoshiki Inamura and NXT Tag Team Champions Nathan Frazer and Axiom as well as NXT Champion Oba Femi after their respective matches, turning heel for the first time in his career. The group made their second appearance at NXT: Roadblock on March 11, where they attacked Je'Von Evans after his match. On the following week, the group's name was revealed as DarkState with Lennox revealed as their leader. On the April 8 episode of NXT, Lennox, James and Shugars defeated Trick Williams, Evans and Femi in a six-man tag team match in their first match as a team. At NXT Heatwave on August 24, Lennox and Griffin defeated Hank and Tank to win the NXT Tag Team Championship. At NXT vs. TNA Showdown on October 7, their reign as NXT Tag Team Champions ended at 44 days by TNA World Tag Team Champions The Hardy Boyz (Jeff Hardy and Matt Hardy) in a Winners Take All Match. Lennox and Griffin regained the titles from The Hardy's in a Broken Rules match at NXT Halloween Havoc. On the December 10 episode of NXT, Lennox handed Shugars his half of the NXT Tag Team Championship in order to focus on singles competition, ending his reign at 38 days. It coincides with him being named to participate in the Men's Iron Survivor Challenge at NXT Deadline on December 6 by John Cena. He entered the Men's Iron Survivor Challenge but did not win the match. He did score one pinfall against the eventual winner, Je'Von Evans.

On the May 19, 2026, episode of NXT, after Saquon Shugars and Osiris Griffin failed to regain the NXT Tag Team Championships held by The Vanity Project, Lennox, alongside the rest of DarkState would brutally assault Shugars after the match, thus removing him from the group. Lennox and Shugars would face each other in a short feud, first at The Great American Bash,, and in a Weaponized Steel Cage match on the 25 August episode of NXT, with Lennox losing both matches.

=== Total Nonstop Action Wrestling (2025–present) ===
On the July 3, 2025 episode of Impact!, Hughes-Murray, as Dion Lennox, made his Total Nonstop Action Wrestling (TNA) debut alongside Darkstate where they attacked Matt Cardona.

== Personal life ==
Hughes-Murray was born in Federal Way, Washington and graduated from Federal Way High School in 2016.

== Championships and accomplishments ==
- WWE
  - NXT Tag Team Championship (2 times) – with Osiris Griffin
