= Lola Vice =

American professional wrestler (born 1998)

- Born: Valerie Loureda; July 19, 1998 (age 28); Miami, Florida, U.S.
- Professional wrestling career
- Ring name(s): Lola Vice; Valerie Loureda
- Billed height: 5 ft 4 in (163 cm)
- Billed weight: 127 lb (58 kg)
- Billed from: Miami, Florida
- Trained by: WWE Performance Center; Sara Amato
- Debut: October 28, 2022
- Martial arts career
- Other names: Master
- Height: 5 ft 4 in (1.63 m)
- Weight: 127 lb (58 kg)
- Division: Flyweight
- Team: American Top Team
- Years active: 2019–2021

Mixed martial arts record
- Total: 5
- Wins: 4
- By knockout: 2
- By decision: 2
- Losses: 1
- By decision: 1

Other information
- Mixed martial arts record from Sherdog

Valerie Loureda (born July 19, 1998) is an American professional wrestler and former mixed martial artist. She has been signed to WWE since August 2022, where she performs on the Raw brand under the ring name Lola Vice. She is a former one-time NXT Women's Champion. She also appeared in WWE's sister promotion Lucha Libre AAA Worldwide (AAA), where she is a former one-time AAA World Mixed Tag Team Champion.

As a mixed martial artist, she competed in the women's flyweight division of Bellator MMA.

== Early life ==
Valerie Loureda was born on July 19, 1998, in Miami, Florida. She is of Cuban descent.

The daughter of a Taekwondo master, Loureda herself is a 4th dan black belt in Taekwondo and was part of the US Olympic Taekwondo team before becoming an MMA fighter. In her two-part promo on September 2 and 9 episodes of NXT, leading to her hometown event of NXT No Mercy, she revealed that her entire family has taekwondo black belt and college degrees.

== Mixed martial arts career ==
Making her MMA debut, Loureda faced Colby Fletcher on February 16, 2019, at Bellator 216. She won the fight by technical knockout. Loureda faced Larkyn Dasch on June 14, 2019, at Bellator 222. She won the bout via unanimous decision.

Loureda next faced Tara Graff on August 7, 2020, at Bellator 243. She won the fight via technical knockout. Loureda was scheduled to face Hannah Guy at Bellator 258 on May 7, 2021, but was moved to Bellator 259 on May 21. She lost the bout via unanimous decision. Loureda faced Taylor Turner on November 12, 2021, at Bellator 271, winning the bout by split decision.

== Professional wrestling career ==
=== WWE ===
==== NXT (2022–2026) ====
In March 2022, Loureda attended a three-day-long WWE tryout during WrestleMania 38 weekend. In August, she signed a contract with WWE and reported to the WWE Performance Center. Loureda was announced to perform under the ring name Lola Vice., she would debut under the name, on a November 2022, live event.

Vice began performing on the NXT brand as a heel, and entered the 2023 NXT Women's Breakout Tournament. Vice defeated Kelani Jordan in the finals, earning a contract for an NXT Women's Championship match at any time of her choosing. At Vengeance Day on February 4, 2024, Vice cashed in her contract during the ongoing NXT Women's Championship match between Roxanne Perez and champion Lyra Valkyria, turning the match into a triple threat; however, Vice was unsuccessful as she was pinned by Valkyria. Vice then began competing in NXT Underground matches where she defeated main roster wrestlers Natalya and Shayna Baszler. On July 7 at NXT Heatwave, Vice unsuccessfully challenged Roxanne Perez for the NXT Women's Championship. Following Heatwave, Vice turned face and entered a feud with Jaida Parker. The feud culminated in a NXT Underground match at NXT Deadline on December 7, where Vice won. At NXT Stand & Deliver on April 19, 2025, Vice competed in a six-woman ladder match for the vacant NXT Women's North American Championship, but was unsuccessful. At Evolution on July 13, Vice entered the 20-woman battle royal but was unsuccessful in the match.

At NXT Heatwave on August 24, Vice won a triple threat match to become number one contender for the NXT Women's Championship but failed to defeat Jacy Jayne for the title at NXT No Mercy on September 27 after interference from a hooded individual, later revealed to be Lainey Reid. At NXT Stand & Deliver on April 4, 2026, Vice defeated Jayne and Kendal Grey in a triple threat match to win the NXT Women's Championship, becoming a double champion in the process and the first female Cuban-American wrestler to win a title in WWE. At NXT The Great American Bash: Orlando in the main event, Vice lost the NXT Women's Championship to Grey, ending her reign at 85 days. On the August 4 episode of NXT, Vice failed to regain the title in a rematch against Grey, and snapped her streak of four consecutive Underground match wins by submission in what would be her final match in NXT. Incidentally, her 4-1 record is the same as her legitimate Bellator record.

==== Raw (2026–present) ====
On the August 24, 2026 episode of Raw, a vignette aired teasing her arrival to the Raw brand. Vice would then make her debut on the brand by participating and winning a triple threat match also involving Raquel Rodriguez and Kelani Jordan to qualify for the 2026 women's Money in the Bank ladder match. At the event on October 10, Vice failed to win the match as it was won by Tiffany Stratton.

=== Lucha Libre AAA Worldwide (2025–2026) ===
On June 7, 2025, at the WWE and Lucha Libre AAA Worldwide event Worlds Collide, Vice teamed with Stephanie Vaquer where the two defeated Chik Tormenta and Dalys. Vice began making appearances in AAA, where she was involved in a storyline with Mr. Iguana fighting for his affection against La Hiedra. On January 31, 2026, Mr. Iguana, as special guest referee, ruled Vice as the winner, with Vice officially replacing La Hiedra for the rematch for AAA World Mixed Tag Team Championship against Ethan Page and Chelsea Green. On the February 7 episode of AAA, Vice and Mr. Iguana would defeat Page and La Hiedra (filling in for an injured Green) to win the titles. At Lucha Libre AAA: Verano De Escándalo, Vice and Mr. Iguana lost to La Hiedra and Laredo Kid, ending the reign at 168 days.

== Other media ==
Loureda, as Lola Vice, made her video game debut as a playable character in WWE 2K25 and has since appeared in WWE 2K26.

== Mixed martial arts record ==
Professional record breakdown
5 matches	4 wins	1 loss
By knockout	2	0
By decision	2	1

Res.	Record	Opponent	Method	Event	Date	Round	Time	Location	Notes
Win	4–1	Taylor Turner	Decision (split)	Bellator 271	November 12, 2021	3	5:00	Hollywood, Florida, United States	Catchweight (128 lb) bout.
Loss	3–1	Hannah Guy	Decision (unanimous)	Bellator 259	May 21, 2021	3	5:00	Uncasville, Connecticut, United States	
Win	3–0	Tara Graff	KO (punches)	Bellator 243	August 7, 2020	2	5:00	Uncasville, Connecticut, United States	
Win	2–0	Larkyn Dasch	Decision (unanimous)	Bellator 222	June 14, 2019	3	5:00	New York City, New York, United States	
Win	1–0	Colby Fletcher	TKO (punches)	Bellator 216	February 16, 2019	1	2:55	Uncasville, Connecticut, United States	Flyweight debut.

== Championships and accomplishments ==
- Pro Wrestling Illustrated
  - Ranked No. 48 of the top 250 female wrestlers in the PWI Female 250 in 2025
- Lucha Libre AAA Worldwide
  - AAA World Mixed Tag Team Championship (1 time) – with Mr. Iguana
- WWE
  - NXT Women's Championship (1 time)
  - NXT Women's Breakout Tournament (2023)
