= NXT Vengeance Day (2026) =

WWE premium live event

- Promotional poster featuring Izzi Dame, Ricky Saints, Tatum Paxley, Kelani Jordan, Joe Hendry, and Lola Vice
- Promotion: WWE
- Brand: NXT
- Date: March 7, 2026
- City: Orlando, Florida
- Venue: WWE Performance Center

WWE event chronology
← Previous; Elimination Chamber	Next → NXT Stand & Deliver

Vengeance Day chronology
← Previous; 2025	Next → —

NXT major events chronology
← Previous; Deadline	Next → Stand & Deliver

The 2026 NXT Vengeance Day was a professional wrestling premium live event (PLE) produced by WWE, held exclusively for wrestlers from the promotion's developmental brand, NXT. It was NXT's sixth annual Vengeance Day and WWE's 14th Vengeance overall. The event took place on Saturday, March 7, 2026, at NXT's home venue, the WWE Performance Center in Orlando, Florida, and was the first Vengeance overall to be held in March.

This was notably NXT's final PLE to livestream on Peacock in the United States due to WWE's contract for NXT's events on the service expiring on March 15. NXT's next PLE, Stand & Deliver, aired on YouTube in the U.S., after which, the events went to The CW starting with The Great American Bash in June and simulcast on ESPN Unlimited beginning in August. This was also WWE's final PLE to stream on the WWE Network in any country as it permanently shut down on April 1 in the remaining four countries that still had the service, with these countries subsequently transitioning to Netflix. It was also the final Vengeance to air on Abema in Japan, which also merged under Netflix on October 1.

Five matches were contested at the event. In the main event, Joe Hendry defeated Ricky Saints to retain the NXT Championship. In other prominent matches, Tatum Paxley defeated Izzi Dame to win the NXT Women's North American Championship, and in the opening bout, Blake Monroe defeated Jaida Parker in a Street Fight.

== Production ==
=== Background ===
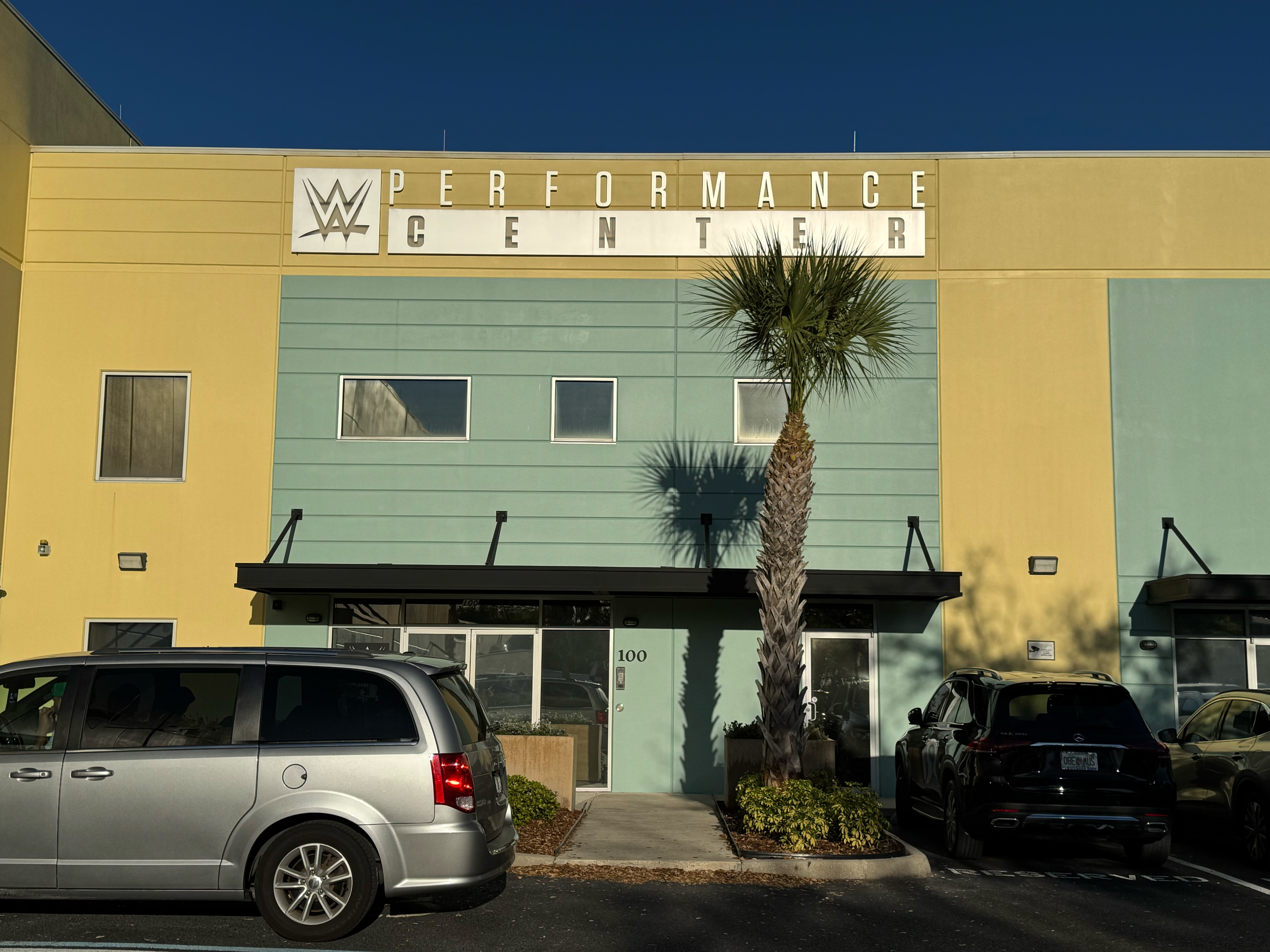
NXT's sixth annual Vengeance Day, and WWE's 14th Vengeance overall, was held at the brand's home venue, the WWE Performance Center in Orlando, Florida.

Vengeance was originally a professional wrestling pay-per-view (PPV) event that was established by WWE in 2001 and held annually until 2007, followed by one event in 2011. It was then reinstated in 2021, becoming an annual February event for WWE's developmental brand, NXT, primarily held as a premium live event (PLE) under the title Vengeance Day, although the 2022 event was broadcast as a television special of NXT. The "Vengeance Day" title was a reference to the event taking place on or around Valentine's Day.

On February 17, 2026, NXT's sixth Vengeance Day, and WWE's 14th Vengeance overall, was announced to be held on Saturday, March 7, 2026, marking NXT's first Vengeance Day to not be held around Valentine's Day or in February, and the first Vengeance overall to be held in March. The venue was later confirmed to be NXT's home arena, the WWE Performance Center in Orlando, Florida.

=== Broadcast outlets ===
The PLE was broadcast on WWE's livestreaming platforms. These included Peacock in the United States, the WWE Network in Austria, Germany, Italy, and Switzerland, SuperSport in Sub-Saharan Africa, Abema in Japan, and Netflix everywhere else. This was NXT's final PLE to stream on Peacock as WWE's contract for NXT's events on the service expired on March 15, and this was notably WWE's final PLE to stream on the WWE Network in any country as the service permanently shut down on April 1 in the remaining four countries that were still on the platform, with these countries subsequently transitioning to Netflix.

=== Storylines ===
The event included five matches that resulted from scripted storylines. Results were predetermined by WWE's writers on the NXT brand, while storylines were produced on WWE's weekly television program, NXT.

On the February 3 episode of NXT, Joe Hendry won the vacant NXT Championship in a seven-man ladder match which also involved former champion Ricky Saints. On the following episode, Saints attacked Hendry after the latter's successful title defense. On the February 17 episode, Hendry attacked Saints in the parking lot, and after that, went to the ring and called out Saints, who then appeared. After some exchange of words, Saints challenged Hendry to put his title on the line against him at Vengeance Day, which Hendry accepted.

Entering 2025, Tatum Paxley formed an alliance with Gigi Dolin and Shotzi. At the end of May, Dolin and Shotzi were released by WWE, effectively disbanding the team. Izzi Dame then successfully recruited Paxley into The Culling (Dame, Niko Vance, and Shawn Spears) by preying on Paxley's emotional instability from losing her former teammates. On the October 14 episode of NXT, Paxley won a battle royal to become the #1 contender for the NXT Women's Championship after Dame eliminated Jordynne Grace which also took Dame out unintentionally, and subsequently defeated Jacy Jayne to win the title at Halloween Havoc. As champion, Paxley agreed to hand out title matches, much to the chagrin of The Culling. AT NXT: Gold Rush – Night 1, Paxley lost the title back to Jayne after The Culling turned on her. Paxley then sought revenge against Dame, culminating in a match at Deadline, which Dame won after a distraction from Spears. Paxley continued to taunt The Culling, leading to a match against Dame at NXT: New Year's Evil in which Paxley was victorious. Later that night, NXT Women's North American Champion Thea Hail held an open challenge for the title, where she stated that whoever got to the ring first would get a title shot; however, when Paxley was close to the ring, Dame appeared and attacked Hail from behind, being the first to reach the ring. Dame subsequently defeated Hail for the title. Their rivalry continued, and on the February 10 episode of NXT, Paxley said in a vignette that she had lost sight of who she was while in The Culling and that she had felt a sense of clarity after leaving the group. After responding to the vignette the following week, Dame announced that she would face Paxley for the title at Vengeance Day.

In October 2025, reigning TNA Knockouts World Champion Kelani Jordan agreed to represent Total Nonstop Action Wrestling (TNA) at NXT vs. TNA Showdown. As a result, some NXT wrestlers considered Jordan as a traitor, kicking her out of NXT's locker room. This included Lola Vice, who was part of Team NXT. After losing the title, Jordan began to feud with Vice, which led to a match on the January 13, 2026, episode of NXT, which Vice won. On the February 3 episode of NXT, Vice challenged for the NXT Women's North American Championship, but was attacked by Jordan, who injured Vice's hand; this subsequently cost Vice the match. This led to a rematch between Vice and Jordan on the February 17 episode of NXT, which was won by Jordan via submission because of the injury. On the next episode, Jordan bragged about becoming the first person to force Vice to submit. After this, Vice attacked Jordan, being separated by other wrestlers. Later that night, Vice demanded an NXT Underground match against Jordan at Vengeance Day, and Interim NXT General Manager Robert Stone subsequently made the match official.

On the January 13 episode of NXT, Jaida Parker returned to NXT in her first televised appearance since October 2025. Parker interrupted Blake Monroe, who did not like it and tried to attack Parker, however, Parker got the upper hand. After innumerous confrontations, Monroe attacked Parker in the parking lot before the February 3 episode of NXT. They faced each other on the following episode, however, the match ended in a countout, but both women continued to fight after the match. Two weeks later, Parker attacked Monroe during her Women's Speed Tournament match, which ultimately caused Monroe to lose. On March 2, Interim NXT General Manager Robert Stone announced that Parker and Monroe would face each other at Vengeance Day. A day later on NXT, after some exchange of words, another brawl occurred, with Parker getting the upper hand once again. Later that night, Monroe announced that she would face Parker in a Street Fight at Vengeance Day.

After the formation of DarkState (Dion Lennox, Saquon Shugars, Cutler James, and Osiris Griffin) at the 2025 Vengeance Day, they began feuding with The D'Angelo Family (Tony D'Angelo, Channing "Stacks" Lorenzo, Luca Crusifino, and Adriana Rizzo). At Stand & Deliver that year, Lennox, Shugars, and James defeated The D'Angelo Family in a six-man tag team match after Lorenzo turned on his team. Over the next few months, dissension among The D'Angelo Family continued until its complete dissolution in July. After a five-month hiatus, D'Angelo made his return at Deadline in December and vowed to destroy DarkState. D'Angelo then defeated James on the February 17, 2026, episode of NXT, and on the following episode, D'Angelo attacked DarkState, costing Griffin and Shugars the NXT Tag Team Championship. The following week, D'Angelo attacked Griffin with a crowbar, causing Lennox to call out D'Angelo, who challenged Lennox to a match at Vengeance Day. Lennox accepted, and it was subsequently made oficial. Lennox also stated that he would be waiting for D'Angelo in the parking lot.

On the February 24 episode of NXT, Sol Ruca challenged Jacy Jayne for the NXT Women's Championship; however, after months of dissension between Ruca and her tag team partner Zaria, the latter turned on Ruca, with Jayne quickly defeating Ruca to retain the title. Because of that, Zaria demanded a title match from Jayne for helping her retain, which was scheduled for the following episode. There, Ruca attacked both women, with the match ending in a no contest. Later that night, Interim NXT General Manager Robert Stone announced that he would announce the future of the NXT Women's Championship at Vengeance Day.

== Event ==
Other on-screen personnel
Role:	Name:
Commentators	Vic Joseph
Commentators	Booker T
Spanish commentators	Marcelo Rodríguez
Spanish commentators	Jerry Soto
Ring announcer	Mike Rome
Referees	Adrian Butler
Referees	Victoria D'Errico
Referees	Felix Fernandez
Referees	Derek Sanders
Referees	Gary Wilson
Interviewers	Sarah Schreiber
Interviewers	Blake Howard
Pre-show panel	Megan Morant
Pre-show panel	Sam Roberts

=== Preliminary matches ===
The PLE opened with a Street Fight between Jaida Parker and Blake Monroe. Monroe introduced multiple weapons into the ring. The match progressed with high-impact weapon spots, including Parker slamming Monroe through a chair wedged into the turnbuckle. Monroe executed a missile dropkick for a near-fall. She then trapped Parker in the "tree of woe" between two chairs. Monroe followed with a high knee but could not get the pinfall. Monroe wrapped a string of pearls around her fist before striking Parker. She then applied a crossface with a kendo stick, but Parker escaped and connected with a blockbuster. Parker laid Monroe across the commentary table and hit a diving splash. Monroe countered the Hip-notic in the ring. Monroe then emptied a bag containing diamonds onto the canvas before performing a Frankensteiner onto the diamonds. Monroe then performed the Glamour Shot once again onto the diamonds to secure the pinfall victory.

Next, the match between Tony D'Angelo and Dion Lennox unofficially began in the infamous NXT parking lot. D’Angelo used a crowbar to fend off DarkState (Lennox, Cutler James, Osiris Griffin, and Saquon Shugars). The brawl moved to the backstage area, where security and officials were unsuccessful in separating the competitors. The brawl moved to ringside with the two men crashing through a wall. The match officially started when they entered the ring. Lennox gained targeted D'Angelo's leg against the ring post and executed a spinebuster for a near-fall. Lennox dismantled the steel steps in an attempt to crush D'Angelo's foot, though D'Angelo escaped. Lennox performed a suplex on D'Angelo from the front row onto the broadcast table. Lennox connected with a rope-assisted powerbomb in the ring for a near-fall. D'Angelo countered a slam into a spear. He then hit a pop-up powerbomb to secure the pinfall victory.

Next, NXT Women's North American Champion Izzi Dame (accompanied by Niko Vance and Shawn Spears) defended her title against Tatum Paxley. Paxley began the match aggressively. Dame drove Paxley into the steel steps and the ring apron. Paxley countered a side slam into a crucifix pin for a near-fall. Dame attempted a Boston Crab but Paxley escaped and applied a Boston Crab of her own, which Dame broke by reaching the ropes. Paxley attempted a 450 splash, which Dame evaded. Paxley successfully connected with a sit-out powerbomb and a 450 splash, though Dame kicked out. Paxley then hit a powerbomb from the ring apron to the floor. Shawn Spears distracted Paxley from returning to the ring, but Paxley narrowly avoided a countout loss. Spears attempted to distract her again on the ring apron, but he was accidentally knocked off the apron by Dame after Paxley avoided the strike attempt. Paxley immediately followed with the Cemetery Drive to win the title.

Interim NXT General Manager Robert Stone addressed the state of the NXT Women's Championship with reigning champion Jacy Jayne and her Fatal Influence stablemates Fallon Henley and Lainey Reid. Zaria interrupted, requesting a title rematch. Then, Sol Ruca appeared to make the same request. Stone officially scheduled a triple threat match for the NXT Women's Championship between Jayne, Zaria, and Ruca on the March 17 episode of NXT. A brawl ensued, ending with Fatal Influence standing strong.

The fourth match was the NXT Underground match between Lola Vice and Kelani Jordan. The match began with the two competitors exchanging grapples. Jordan targeted Vice's previously injured hand. Vice utilized the ring post to strike Jordan's hand, but Jordan responded by removing Vice's MMA gloves before landing a knee strike. Jordan had a verbal confrontation with Vice's father on the front row. Vice retaliated with a spinning backfist to Jordan, knocking her out. The referee stopped the match and declared Vice as the winner via technical knockout.

=== Main event ===
The main event was for the NXT Championship, with Joe Hendry defending against Ricky Saints. Saints utilized his speed to target Hendry's legs. Hendry countered with a stalling vertical suplex on the floor. Saints attempted a rope-walk maneuver, which Hendry intercepted to send the challenger back to ringside. After Hendry escaped a submission attempt, the two traded high-impact maneuvers. Saints applied a front facelock sleeper; however, Hendry powered out to land a suplex. Hendry hit a fallaway slam from the top rope for a near-fall. Ethan Page appeared, grabbing the title belt to distract Hendry. It backfired as Hendry tried to pin Saints, who then connected with a spear. Page threw the title belt into the ring and Saints attempted to use it, but he was intercepted by the referee. With the official's back turned, Saints struck Hendry with a low blow and the Revolution DDT, but Hendry kicked out. As Hendry attempted the Standing Ovation, he accidentally hit the referee. He took the opportunity to land a low blow of his own before executing the Standing Ovation to retain the title.

== Aftermath ==
As a result of WWE's contract with Peacock to air NXT's PLEs expiring on March 15 in the United States, shortly after Vengeance Day, it was announced that NXT's next PLE, Stand & Deliver, would be livestreamed in the US on WWE's YouTube channel in April. After Stand & Deliver, it was confirmed that The CW (which had broadcast NXT since October 2024) had acquired the rights to broadcast NXT's PLEs on its channel in the US beginning with The Great American Bash in June. It was subsequently confirmed that beginning in August, all of NXT's programming would also be simulcast on ESPN Unlimited in the US. This would also be the final Vengeance to air on Abema in Japan, which merged under Netflix on October 1.

== Results ==
No.	Results	Stipulations	Times
1	Blake Monroe defeated Jaida Parker by pinfall	Street Fight	12:59
2	Tony D'Angelo defeated Dion Lennox by pinfall	Singles match	7:04
3	Tatum Paxley defeated Izzi Dame (c) (with Niko Vance and Shawn Spears) by pinfall	Singles match for the NXT Women's North American Championship	15:25
4	Lola Vice defeated Kelani Jordan by technical knockout	NXT Underground match	6:37
5	Joe Hendry (c) defeated Ricky Saints by pinfall	Singles match for the NXT Championship	16:16
(c) / – the champion(s) heading into the match
