= NXT (WWE brand) =

Professional wrestling brand

- Logo for the brand and WWE NXT (2024–present)
- Product type: Professional wrestling Sports entertainment
- Current owner: WWE
- Produced by: Paul "Triple H" Levesque; Lee Fitting; Shawn Michaels
- Country: United States
- Introduced: February 23, 2010
- Related brands: Raw; SmackDown
- Tagline: 8 NXT Rookies. 8 WWE Pros. 1 Dream. (2010–2012); We Are NXT (2015–present)
- Previous names: NXT 2.0 (September 14, 2021–September 13, 2022)
- General Manager; Robert Stone Predecessors: ECW (WWE brand); Florida Championship Wrestling

NXT is a developmental brand of the American professional wrestling promotion WWE, serving as a training ground for wrestlers before they move to WWE's main roster on either Raw or SmackDown. Introduced on February 23, 2010, NXT features a separate roster of wrestlers who primarily appear on the brand's weekly television program, NXT. Unlike Raw and SmackDown, which are affected by WWE's brand extension, NXT operates as a developmental system regardless of whether a brand split is in effect.

In its original incarnation, NXT was a reality-based television show in which rookies competed to become a star in WWE. In 2012, NXT was relaunched as a separate brand and replaced the now-defunct Florida Championship Wrestling (FCW) as WWE's developmental territory. Primarily holding its events in the Orlando, Florida, area since its relaunch, the brand would be expanded upon over time, having embarked on national and international tours. Wrestling critics and fans came to view NXT as its own distinct entity during this period, with the brand's shows being praised for their high-quality matches and storylines. It is also praised for its increased focus on women's wrestling, as its women are presented as genuine wrestlers, eventually giving way to the WWE Women's Evolution. In September 2021, the brand relaunched under the "NXT 2.0" banner, reinstituting its original function as a developmental brand, and a year later reverted to its original "NXT" name.

In addition to NXT's main television program, the brand's wrestlers may also appear on the supplementary show, Evolve, the main program of NXT's subsidiary brand Evolve. Some NXT wrestlers also occasionally appear on Raw's supplementary program, Main Event, typically when they are in consideration to being promoted to the main roster, and on TNA Impact! due to the working relationship with Total Nonstop Action Wrestling (TNA) that began in 2024. From 2014 to 2021, the brand held its major events under the NXT TakeOver series, but this event series was discontinued with the rebranding to NXT 2.0. WWE also operated a subsidiary brand under NXT called NXT UK, which was based in and produced for wrestlers in the United Kingdom; the brand is currently on hiatus and will relaunch at a later time as NXT Europe to become a Pan-European brand. Another subsidiary brand, 205 Live, existed under NXT from 2019 until 2022 when 205 Live was dissolved. After WWE's acquisition of Lucha Libre AAA Worldwide (AAA) in April 2025, it was reported that WWE was considering rebranding AAA to "NXT Mexico", though this has not yet happened.

NXT also serves as the host of WWE's Speed championship series, open to challengers from NXT, Raw, SmackDown, and Evolve, as well as TNA and AAA. A separate Speed program was originally exclusive to the social media platform X from 2024 to 2025 and was mostly disconnected from WWE's other programs. After Speed was discontinued, its championships were absorbed into NXT.

== History ==
=== Launch ===
NXT formed in 2010, following the dissolution of the ECW brand. The origins can be traced to 1992 when Eastern Championship Wrestling was created as an affiliate within the National Wrestling Alliance (NWA); but was renamed to Extreme Championship Wrestling (ECW) in 1994 after its secession from the NWA. Known for hardcore matches, ECW developed one of the most successful cult followings in professional wrestling under Paul Heyman's leadership. After ECW was closed in 2001 due to bankruptcy, it briefly re-emerged as a leading force during WWE's Invasion storyline. In 2003, WWE acquired the assets of ECW and organized a number of ECW One Night Stand reunion shows, which led to the relaunch of ECW on Sci-Fi as a third brand. As the years went by, the ECW brand's focus shifted from the original ECW alumni towards experimenting with new and upcoming stars, which laid the ground work for NXT.

Initially, a dispute occurred over the "NXT" trademark between WWE and Scotland's Scottish Wrestling Alliance (SWA), an NWA territory whose developmental division was called "NXT". WWE worked with SWA to secure the NXT trademark for their new series, and SWA renamed its developmental branch to "SWA: Source". Following the end of the final ECW episode on February 16, 2010, WWE debuted the NXT television program one week later on February 23, 2010 - it featured rookies from WWE's Tampa, Florida-based developmental territory Florida Championship Wrestling (FCW) competing to become members of WWE's main roster.

=== Early history as a developmental territory ===
In June 2012, WWE ceased operating FCW, and instead started running all of its developmental events and operations at Full Sail University under the NXT banner. The television show would also be revamped the same month to focus exclusively on developmental talent.

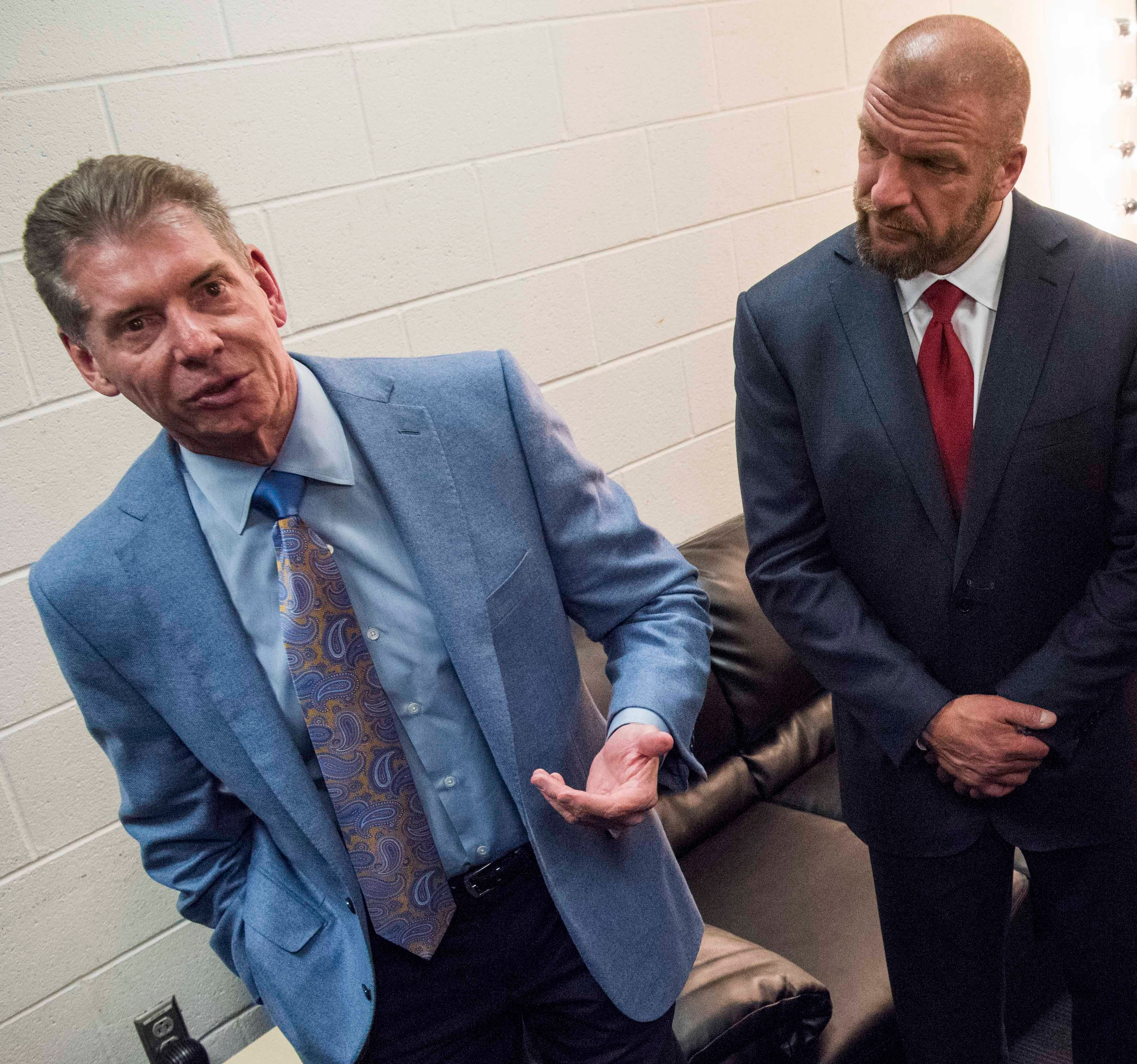
WWE chairman Vince McMahon (left) with son-in-law and NXT founder Triple H

On February 27, 2014, NXT held a live, two-hour event, NXT Arrival, serving as the first live wrestling event for the newly launched WWE Network service. After the second live event in May 2014, NXT TakeOver, the "TakeOver" name would be used for future live NXT events airing on WWE Network.

In March 2015, NXT promoted its first live event outside of Florida with an event in Columbus, Ohio. On August 22, 2015, NXT held its first TakeOver event outside of Full Sail University, with NXT TakeOver: Brooklyn at New York City's Barclays Center—acting as a support event for SummerSlam. In December of the same year, NXT held its first TakeOver event outside of the United States with NXT TakeOver: London. By 2016, NXT was running approximately 200 shows per year between the United States and overseas.

==== Bill DeMott controversy ====
In late February and March 2015, several former NXT trainees previously working within WWE developmental system alleged misconduct by head trainer Bill DeMott, with Judas Devlin and Brandon Traven publicizing complaints which they claimed they had submitted to WWE management about DeMott back in March 2013 when they were still signed with WWE. Meanwhile, other ex trainees like Briley Pierce, Derrick Bateman and independent wrestler Terra Calaway also made allegations in 2015, while previous allegations made in 2013 by Chad Baxter and Chase Donovan were also noted. They accused DeMott of making trainees perform dangerous drills, physically assaulting and bullying trainees, using homophobic and racial slurs amongst other derogatory terms and condoning sexual harassment. WWE released statements regarding some of the claims that came to light in 2013 and 2015, saying that investigations were done and no wrongdoing was found. On March 6, 2015, DeMott denied the allegations, but resigned from WWE.

=== The Wednesday Night Wars ===
On August 20, 2019, it was announced that the NXT television series would move to USA Network and expand into a two-hour, live broadcast on Wednesday nights beginning September 18, 2019. The timing of the premiere coincided with SmackDown's move to FOX in October. As a result of the move, the show would compete with All Elite Wrestling (AEW)'s weekly show, Dynamite, on TNT; marking the beginning of the "Wednesday Night Wars".

On October 18, 2019, it was announced by Drake Maverick that NXT and the 205 Live brand would begin a talent exchange. In an interview with VultureHound Magazine on September 12, executive producer Triple H would confirm that both the 205 Live and NXT UK brands would essentially be subsidiaries to NXT, with their respective talents and personnel falling under the NXT banner.

On October 31, 2019, it was announced that NXT would take part in that year's Survivor Series, competing directly against Raw and SmackDown. In 2020, after winning that year's women's Royal Rumble match, Charlotte Flair chose to challenge Rhea Ripley for the NXT Women's Championship at WrestleMania 36, establishing that NXT championships were also options for Rumble winners to choose as they are guaranteed a world championship match of their choice at WrestleMania (this remained until 2022, though 2025 Women's Royal Rumble winner Charlotte Flair briefly teased going after the NXT Women's Championship again before ultimately deciding on the WWE Women's Championship).

During this time period, some at NXT referred to the promotion as WWE's 'third brand', although many journalists still referred to NXT as developmental, with Raw and SmackDown viewed as WWE's "main roster". WWE wrestler Matt Riddle called NXT a "small ocean", while "when you get to the main roster you are in the ocean". Reflecting on the Wednesday Night Wars in a 2022 interview, Levesque said, "People put so much pressure on [this] 'competitive war'...it never was that. ... they beat our developmental system, good for them". This effectively retracted the view that NXT was one of their top three brands during that time.

=== Move to Tuesday nights ===
The Wednesday Night Wars came to an end in April 2021 when NXT was moved to Tuesday nights. After 12 NXT wrestlers were released from their contracts that August, Dave Scherer and Mike Johnson of Pro Wrestling Insider reported there had been internal talks of major changes to the brand, such as: "a new logo, new lighting, a focus on younger talents and a different format to the TV shows." Dave Meltzer reported that NXT would likely go back to its developmental roots, with "talent that are [sic] younger, bigger and that could someday main event at WrestleMania". WWE President Nick Khan subsequently confirmed that NXT would undergo a "complete revamp" overseen by Levesque. However, due to undergoing heart surgery in September, Levesque stepped away from the brand and Shawn Michaels stepped in to oversee the creative aspect of the brand.

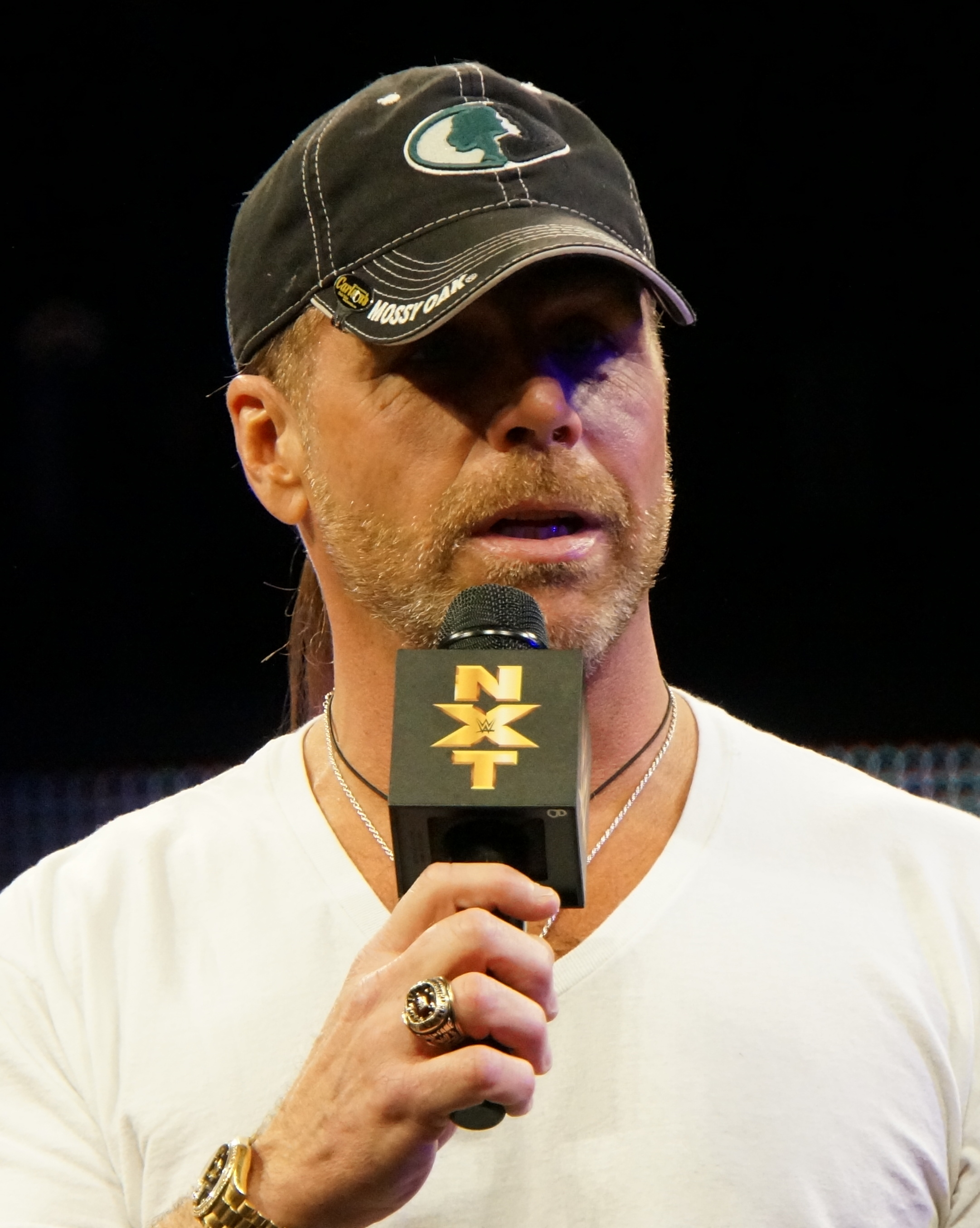
Shawn Michaels - in his role as a Sr. Vice President in WWE - has been in charge of the NXT brand since September 2021

Dubbed NXT 2.0, the revamp began on the September 14 episode of NXT. NXT and 205 Live would emanate from a fully redesigned venue at the WWE Performance Center to coincide with the revamp, dropping the "Capitol Wrestling Center" name. The NXT TakeOver series would also be discontinued, with that year's WarGames event being the brand's first PPV to not be held under the "TakeOver" name. The 2021 WarGames was also NXT's last event to air on traditional PPV, as from 2022 onwards, the events only air via WWE's livestreaming platforms. Since its revamp, many of the NXT wrestlers were released en masse in November 2021 due to budget cuts and the ongoing COVID-19 pandemic that involved administrative staff, plant, and wrestlers. This fractured further in January 2022, several backstage workers were released, most of them known for their work with Levesque, including NXT General Manager William Regal and writer Ryan Katz. On February 15, PWInsider reported that WWE was ceasing the production of 205 Live episodes, replacing the series with a new supplementary show for NXT called Level Up, which premiered on Peacock and the WWE Network on February 18.

Briefly in 2022, talents from NXT appeared on Monday Night Raw similar to the ECW talent exchange in 2007. Meltzer reported that Raw–NXT crossovers were a way to help boost the programs' ratings, since they both aired on the USA Network.

In September 2022, Michaels was promoted to Senior Vice President of Talent Development Creative, responsible for both creative and development at NXT, and for the expansion of NXT UK into NXT Europe at a later time. At the conclusion of the September 13, 2022, episode of NXT—which marked the one-year anniversary of the revamp—an updated logo for the brand was unveiled, dropping the "NXT 2.0" title and adopting a gold color scheme reminiscent of the original NXT branding.

In late-2022, after Triple H became chief content officer of WWE, NXT wrestlers began to increasingly make appearances on WWE's mid-card program Main Event. These crossovers came as part of efforts to increase the profile of NXT's talent, and evaluate their performances with members of WWE's main roster.

In 2024, WWE began a wider talent exchange with Total Nonstop Action Wrestling (TNA). Several TNA wrestlers would make appearances on NXT's weekly television series and livestreaming events and vice versa. A multi-year partnership between TNA and WWE was officially announced on January 16, 2025.

On August 24, 2025, at Heatwave, NXT general manager Ava announced that the men's WWE Speed Championship and the WWE Women's Speed Championship would be defended on the NXT brand going forward. The titles were previously exclusively defended on the online program Speed and available to wrestlers from Raw, SmackDown, and NXT. After Speed stopped airing new episodes after July 9, this effectively confirmed the end of that series.

== Championships and accomplishments ==
The colors and symbols indicate the brand of the champions (if they are not part of the NXT roster).

†	Raw	‡	SmackDown

=== Current championships ===
NXT
Championship	Current champion(s)		Reign	Date won	Days held	Days rec.	Location	Notes	Ref.
NXT Championship		Grayson Waller	1	August 30, 2026	72	72	Edinburg, Texas, United States	Defeated previous champion Tony D'Angelo, Cruz Montana, and Zilla Fatu in a fatal four-way match at Heatwave.	
NXT Women's Championship	N/A	Kelani Jordan	1	August 30, 2026	72	72	Edinburg, Texas, United States	Defeated Kendal Grey at Heatwave.	
NXT North American Championship	N/A	Jackson Drake	1	August 30, 2026	72	72	Edinburg, Texas, United States	Defeated Myles Borne at Heatwave.	
NXT Women's North American Championship	N/A	Zaria	1	June 9, 2026	154	154	Orlando, Florida, United States	Defeated Tatum Paxley on NXT.	
NXT Tag Team Championship		The Vanity Project (Brad Baylor & Ricky Smokes)	2	August 30, 2026	72	72	Edinburg, Texas, United States	Defeated Myles Borne and Tavion Heights at Heatwave.	

=== Previous championships ===
Championship	Time on brand
NXT Cruiserweight Championship	October 9, 2019 — January 4, 2022 (Note: The championship was shared with the 205 Live and NXT UK brands until it was unified with the NXT North American Championship on January 4, 2022 and subsequently retired.)
Million Dollar Championship	June 13, 2021 — August 23, 2021
WWE 24/7 Championship	May 20, 2019 — November 9, 2022 (Note: The championship was shared amongst all of WWE's brands, until it was retired on November 9, 2022.)
NXT Women's Tag Team Championship	March 10, 2021 — June 23, 2023 (Note: As a result of the 2023 WWE Draft, the title was briefly on the SmackDown brand from May to June 2023 until it was unified with the WWE Women's Tag Team Championship on the June 23, 2023, episode of SmackDown and subsequently retired.)
NXT Heritage Cup	September 10, 2020 — July 12, 2025
WWE Women's Speed Championship	August 9, 2024 – August 30, 2026 (Note: The championship was shared amongst all of WWE's brands, until it was unified with the NXT Women's North American Championship on August 30, 202 and subsequently retired.)
WWE Speed Championship	March 27, 2024 – September 1, 2026 (Note: The championship was shared amongst all of WWE's brands, until it was retired on September 1, 2026.)

=== Other accomplishment(s) ===
Championship	Latest winner(s)	Date won	Location	Notes
Dusty Rhodes Tag Team Classic	Baron Corbin and Bron Breakker	February 4, 2024	Clarksville, Tennessee	Defeated Carmelo Hayes and Trick Williams in the tournament final at Vengeance Day to win
Women's Dusty Rhodes Tag Team Classic	Io Shirai and Kay Lee Ray	March 22, 2022	Orlando, Florida	Defeated Dakota Kai and Wendy Choo in the tournament final on NXT 2.0 to win

== Television show ==
The WWE Network was the main broadcaster of NXT's eponymous television program in the United States from 2014 to 2019. Regular episodes ran for one-hour and aired on tape delay, while live NXT TakeOver events were produced periodically. Beginning on May 17, 2012, WWE began filming NXT at Full Sail University in Winter Park, Florida, with the venue being billed on air as "Full Sail Live".

In its original format from 2010 to 2012, the series was a seasonally-broadcast competition series that was filmed in large venues during the SmackDown tapings. The series saw "NXT Rookies" paired with "WWE Pros", with the pairs competing in challenges until one sole winner remained. As with WWE's main programming, the series followed scripted storylines, where wrestlers portrayed heroes, villains, or less distinguishable characters that built tension and culminated in a series of matches or challenges. Results were predetermined by WWE's writers, while storylines were produced on the weekly series. Over the course of its five-season run, the winners of each season were Wade Barrett (Season 1), Kaval (Season 2), Kaitlyn (Season 3) and Johnny Curtis (Season 4). After NXT Redemption, the show's seasonal format was dropped.

== Major events ==
Event	Date	Venue	Location	Main event	Ref.
Arrival	February 27, 2014	Full Sail University	Winter Park, Florida	Bo Dallas (c) vs. Adrian Neville for the NXT Championship	
TakeOver	May 29, 2014	Full Sail University	Winter Park, Florida	Adrian Neville (c) vs. Tyson Kidd for the NXT Championship	
TakeOver: Fatal 4-Way	September 11, 2014	Full Sail University	Winter Park, Florida	Adrian Neville (c) vs. Sami Zayn vs. Tyler Breeze vs. Tyson Kidd for the NXT Championship	
TakeOver: R Evolution	December 11, 2014	Full Sail University	Winter Park, Florida	Adrian Neville (c) vs. Sami Zayn in a Title vs. Career match for the NXT Championship	
TakeOver: Rival	February 11, 2015	Full Sail University	Winter Park, Florida	Sami Zayn (c) vs. Kevin Owens for the NXT Championship	
TakeOver: Unstoppable	May 20, 2015	Full Sail University	Winter Park, Florida	Kevin Owens (c) vs. Sami Zayn for the NXT Championship	
TakeOver: Brooklyn	August 22, 2015	Barclays Center	Brooklyn, New York	Finn Bálor (c) vs. Kevin Owens in a Ladder match for the NXT Championship	
TakeOver: Respect	October 7, 2015	Full Sail University	Winter Park, Florida	Bayley (c) vs. Sasha Banks in a 30-minute Iron Man match for the NXT Women's Championship	
TakeOver: London	December 16, 2015	SSE Arena	Wembley, London, England	Finn Bálor (c) vs. Samoa Joe for the NXT Championship	
TakeOver: Dallas	April 1, 2016	Kay Bailey Hutchison Convention Center	Dallas, Texas	Finn Bálor (c) vs. Samoa Joe for the NXT Championship	
TakeOver: The End	June 8, 2016	Full Sail University	Winter Park, Florida	Samoa Joe (c) vs. Finn Bálor in a Steel Cage match for the NXT Championship	
TakeOver: Brooklyn II	August 20, 2016	Barclays Center	Brooklyn, New York	Samoa Joe (c) vs. Shinsuke Nakamura for the NXT Championship	
TakeOver: Toronto	November 19, 2016	Air Canada Centre	Toronto, Ontario, Canada	Shinsuke Nakamura (c) vs. Samoa Joe for the NXT Championship	
TakeOver: San Antonio	January 28, 2017	Freeman Coliseum	San Antonio, Texas	Shinsuke Nakamura (c) vs. Bobby Roode for the NXT Championship	
TakeOver: Orlando	April 1, 2017	Amway Center	Orlando, Florida	Bobby Roode (c) vs. Shinsuke Nakamura for the NXT Championship	
TakeOver: Chicago	May 20, 2017	Allstate Arena	Rosemont, Illinois	The Authors of Pain (Akam and Rezar) (c) vs. DIY (Johnny Gargano and Tommaso Ciampa) in a Ladder match for the NXT Tag Team Championship	
TakeOver: Brooklyn III	August 19, 2017	Barclays Center	Brooklyn, New York	Bobby Roode (c) vs. Drew McIntyre for the NXT Championship	
TakeOver: WarGames	November 18, 2017	Toyota Center	Houston, Texas	Sanity (Alexander Wolfe, Eric Young, and Killian Dain) vs. The Authors of Pain (Akam and Rezar) and Roderick Strong vs. The Undisputed Era (Adam Cole, Bobby Fish, and Kyle O'Reilly) in a WarGames match	
TakeOver: Philadelphia	January 27, 2018	Wells Fargo Center	Philadelphia, Pennsylvania	Andrade "Cien" Almas (c) vs. Johnny Gargano for the NXT Championship	
TakeOver: New Orleans	April 7, 2018	Smoothie King Center	New Orleans, Louisiana	Johnny Gargano vs. Tommaso Ciampa in an unsanctioned match	
TakeOver: Chicago II	June 16, 2018	Allstate Arena	Rosemont, Illinois	Johnny Gargano vs. Tommaso Ciampa in a Chicago Street Fight	
U.K. Championship	June 26, 2018	Royal Albert Hall	Kensington, London, England	Pete Dunne (c) vs. Zack Gibson for the WWE United Kingdom Championship	
TakeOver: Brooklyn 4	August 18, 2018	Barclays Center	Brooklyn, New York	Tommaso Ciampa (c) vs. Johnny Gargano in a Last Man Standing match for the NXT Championship	
TakeOver: WarGames	November 17, 2018	Staples Center	Los Angeles, California	Pete Dunne, Ricochet, and War Raiders (Hanson and Rowe) vs. The Undisputed Era (Adam Cole, Bobby Fish, Kyle O'Reilly and Roderick Strong) in a WarGames match	
TakeOver: Phoenix	January 26, 2019	Talking Stick Resort Arena	Phoenix, Arizona	Tommaso Ciampa (c) vs. Aleister Black for the NXT Championship	
Halftime Heat	February 3, 2019	WWE Performance Center	Orlando, Florida	Aleister Black, Ricochet and Velveteen Dream vs. Adam Cole, Johnny Gargano and Tommaso Ciampa	
TakeOver: New York	April 5, 2019	Barclays Center	Brooklyn, New York	Johnny Gargano vs Adam Cole in a two-out-of-three falls match for the vacant NXT Championship	
TakeOver: XXV	June 1, 2019	Webster Bank Arena	Bridgeport, Connecticut	Johnny Gargano (c) vs. Adam Cole for the NXT Championship	
TakeOver: Toronto	August 10, 2019	Scotiabank Arena	Toronto, Ontario	Adam Cole (c) vs. Johnny Gargano in a two-out-of-three falls match for the NXT Championship	
TakeOver: WarGames	November 23, 2019	Allstate Arena	Rosemont, Illinois	Tommaso Ciampa, Keith Lee, Dominik Dijakovic, and Kevin Owens vs. The Undisputed Era (Adam Cole, Bobby Fish, Kyle O'Reilly, and Roderick Strong) in a WarGames match	
TakeOver: Portland	February 16, 2020	Moda Center	Portland, Oregon	Adam Cole (c) vs. Tommaso Ciampa for the NXT Championship	
TakeOver: In Your House	June 7, 2020	Full Sail University	Winter Park, Florida	Charlotte Flair (c) vs. Rhea Ripley vs. Io Shirai in a triple threat match for the NXT Women's Championship	
TakeOver XXX	August 22, 2020	Full Sail University	Winter Park, Florida	Keith Lee (c) vs. Karrion Kross for the NXT Championship	
TakeOver 31	October 4, 2020	Capitol Wrestling Center at the WWE Performance Center	Orlando, Florida	Finn Bálor (c) vs. Kyle O'Reilly for the NXT Championship	
TakeOver: WarGames	December 6, 2020	Capitol Wrestling Center at the WWE Performance Center	Orlando, Florida	The Undisputed Era (Adam Cole, Kyle O'Reilly, Roderick Strong, and Bobby Fish) vs. Team McAfee (Pat McAfee, Pete Dunne, Danny Burch, and Oney Lorcan) in a WarGames match	
TakeOver: Vengeance Day	February 14, 2021	Capitol Wrestling Center at the WWE Performance Center	Orlando, Florida	Finn Bálor (c) vs. Pete Dunne for the NXT Championship	
TakeOver: Stand & Deliver	April 7, 2021	Capitol Wrestling Center at the WWE Performance Center	Orlando, Florida	Io Shirai (c) vs. Raquel González for the NXT Women's Championship	
TakeOver: Stand & Deliver	April 8, 2021	Capitol Wrestling Center at the WWE Performance Center	Orlando, Florida	Kyle O'Reilly vs. Adam Cole in an unsanctioned match	
TakeOver: In Your House	June 13, 2021	Capitol Wrestling Center at the WWE Performance Center	Orlando, Florida	Karrion Kross (c) vs. Kyle O'Reilly vs. Adam Cole vs. Johnny Gargano vs. Pete Dunne in a Fatal 5-Way match for the NXT Championship	
TakeOver 36	August 22, 2021	Capitol Wrestling Center at the WWE Performance Center	Orlando, Florida	Karrion Kross (c) vs. Samoa Joe for the NXT Championship	
WarGames	December 5, 2021	WWE Performance Center	Orlando, Florida	Team 2.0 (Bron Breakker, Grayson Waller, Tony D'Angelo, and Carmelo Hayes) vs. Team Black & Gold (Johnny Gargano, L. A. Knight, Pete Dunne, and Tommaso Ciampa) in a WarGames match	
Stand & Deliver	April 2, 2022	American Airlines Center	Dallas, Texas	Dolph Ziggler (c) vs. Bron Breakker for the NXT Championship	
In Your House	June 4, 2022	WWE Performance Center	Orlando, Florida	Bron Breakker (c) vs. Joe Gacy for the NXT Championship	
Worlds Collide	September 4, 2022	WWE Performance Center	Orlando, Florida	Bron Breakker (c) vs. Tyler Bate (c) to unify the NXT Championship and NXT UK Championship	
Halloween Havoc	October 22, 2022	WWE Performance Center	Orlando, Florida	Bron Breakker (c) vs. Ilja Dragunov vs. JD McDonagh for the NXT Championship	
Deadline	December 10, 2022	WWE Performance Center	Orlando, Florida	Bron Breakker (c) vs. Apollo Crews for the NXT Championship	
Vengeance Day	February 4, 2023	Spectrum Center	Charlotte, North Carolina	Bron Breakker (c) vs. Grayson Waller in a Steel Cage match for the NXT Championship	
Stand & Deliver	April 1, 2023	Crypto.com Arena	Los Angeles, California	Bron Breakker (c) vs. Carmelo Hayes for the NXT Championship	
Battleground	May 28, 2023	Tsongas Center	Lowell, Massachusetts	Carmelo Hayes (c) vs. Bron Breakker for the NXT Championship	
The Great American Bash	July 30, 2023	H-E-B Center at Cedar Park	Cedar Park, Texas	Carmelo Hayes (c) vs. Ilja Dragunov for the NXT Championship	
No Mercy	September 30, 2023	Mechanics Bank Arena	Bakersfield, California	Becky Lynch (c) vs. Tiffany Stratton in an Extreme Rules match for the NXT Women's Championship	
Deadline	December 9, 2023	Total Mortgage Arena	Bridgeport, Connecticut	Ilja Dragunov (c) vs. Baron Corbin for the NXT Championship	
Vengeance Day	February 4, 2024	F&M Bank Arena	Clarksville, Tennessee	Ilja Dragunov (c) vs. Trick Williams for the NXT Championship	
Stand & Deliver	April 6, 2024	Wells Fargo Center	Philadelphia, Pennsylvania	Trick Williams vs. Carmelo Hayes	
Battleground	June 9, 2024	UFC Apex	Enterprise, Nevada	Trick Williams (c) vs. Ethan Page for the NXT Championship	
Heatwave	July 7, 2024	Scotiabank Arena	Toronto, Ontario, Canada	Trick Williams (c) vs. Je'Von Evans vs. Ethan Page vs. Shawn Spears in a fatal four-way match for the NXT Championship	
No Mercy	September 1, 2024	Ball Arena	Denver, Colorado	Ethan Page (c) vs. Joe Hendry for the NXT Championship with Trick Williams as the special guest referee	
Halloween Havoc	October 27, 2024	Giant Center	Hershey, Pennsylvania	Trick Williams (c) vs. Ethan Page in a Spin the Wheel, Make the Deal: Devil's Playground match for the NXT Championship	
Deadline	December 7, 2024	Minneapolis Armory	Minneapolis, Minnesota	Sol Ruca vs. Stephanie Vaquer vs. Zaria vs. Giulia vs. Wren Sinclair in a Women's Iron Survivor Challenge to determine the #1 contender for the NXT Women's Championship at NXT: New Year's Evil	
Vengeance Day	February 15, 2025	CareFirst Arena	Washington, D.C.	Giulia (c) vs. Bayley vs. Roxanne Perez vs. Cora Jade in a fatal four-way match for the NXT Women's Championship	
Stand & Deliver	April 19, 2025	T-Mobile Arena	Paradise, Nevada	Oba Femi (c) vs. Trick Williams vs. Je'Von Evans in a triple threat match for the NXT Championship	
Battleground	May 25, 2025	Yuengling Center	Tampa, Florida	Joe Hendry (c) vs. Trick Williams for the TNA World Championship	
Worlds Collide	June 7, 2025	Kia Forum	Inglewood, California	El Hijo del Vikingo (c) vs. Chad Gable for the AAA Mega Championship	
The Great American Bash	July 12, 2025	Center Stage	Atlanta, Georgia	Jordynne Grace and Blake Monroe vs. Fatal Influence (Jacy Jayne and Fallon Henley)	
Heatwave	August 24, 2025	Lowell Memorial Auditorium	Lowell, Massachusetts	Oba Femi (c) vs. Je'Von Evans for the NXT Championship	
Worlds Collide	September 12, 2025	Cox Pavilion at the Thomas & Mack Center	Paradise, Nevada	El Hijo del Vikingo (c) vs. Dominik Mysterio for the AAA Mega Championship	
No Mercy	September 27, 2025	FTL War Memorial	Fort Lauderdale, Florida	Oba Femi (c) vs. Ricky Saints for the NXT Championship	
Halloween Havoc	October 25, 2025	Findlay Toyota Center	Prescott Valley, Arizona	Ricky Saints (c) vs. Trick Williams for the NXT Championship	
Deadline	December 6, 2025	Boeing Center at Tech Port	San Antonio, Texas	Je'Von Evans vs. Leon Slater vs. Joe Hendry vs. Dion Lennox vs. Myles Borne in a Men's Iron Survivor Challenge to determine the #1 contender to the NXT Championship at NXT: New Year's Evil	
Vengeance Day	March 7, 2026	WWE Performance Center	Orlando, Florida	Joe Hendry (c) vs. Ricky Saints for the NXT Championship	
Stand & Deliver	April 4, 2026	The Factory at The District	Chesterfield, Missouri	Joe Hendry (c) vs. Ricky Saints vs. Ethan Page vs. Tony D'Angelo in a fatal four-way match for the NXT Championship	
The Great American Bash	June 28, 2026	WWE Performance Center	Orlando, Florida	Lola Vice (c) vs. Kendal Grey for the NXT Women's Championship	
Heatwave	August 30, 2026	Bert Ogden Arena	Edinburg, Texas	Grayson Waller vs. Cruz Montana vs. Zilla Fatu in a Fatal four-way match for the NXT Championship	
Worlds Collide	September 26, 2026	Allstate Arena	Rosemont, Illinois	CM Punk, Rey Mysterio, and El Grande Americano vs. Omos, Dominik Mysterio, and JD McDonagh	
Halloween Havoc	October 31, 2026	WWE Performance Center	Orlando, Florida	Grayson Waller (c) vs. Tony D'Angelo for the NXT Championship	
TLC: Tables, Ladders & Chairs	December 12, 2026	WWE Performance Center	Orlando, Florida		
Worlds Collide	December 15, 2026	ESPN Wide World of Sports Complex	Kissimmee, Florida		
