= NXT Stand & Deliver (2026) =

WWE premium live event

- Promotional poster featuring various NXT wrestlers
- Promotion: WWE
- Brand: NXT
- Date: April 4, 2026
- City: Chesterfield, Missouri
- Venue: The Factory at the District
- Attendance: 1,767

WWE event chronology
← Previous; NXT Vengeance Day	Next → WrestleMania 42

NXT Stand & Deliver chronology
← Previous; 2025	Next → 2027

NXT major events chronology
← Previous; Vengeance Day	Next → The Great American Bash

The 2026 NXT Stand & Deliver, also promoted as NXT Stand & Deliver: St. Louis, was a professional wrestling premium live event (PLE) produced by WWE, held for wrestlers from the promotion's developmental brand, NXT. It was the sixth annual Stand & Deliver and took place on Saturday, April 4, 2026, at The Factory at The District in the St. Louis suburb of Chesterfield, Missouri. This was the first Stand & Deliver to take place outside of WrestleMania week. The event also featured an appearance by St. Louis native and rapper Sexyy Red.

Seven matches were contested at the event, including one on the Countdown to Stand & Deliver: St. Louis pre-show. While primarily held for NXT, the event also featured a couple of wrestlers from WWE's main roster brands, Raw and SmackDown. In the main event, Tony D'Angelo defeated previous champion Joe Hendry, Ricky Saints, and Ethan Page in a fatal four-way match to win the NXT Championship, which made D'Angelo the first-ever NXT Grand Slam Champion. In other prominent matches, Sol Ruca defeated Zaria, and in the opening bout, Lola Vice defeated previous champion Jacy Jayne and Kendal Grey in a triple threat match to win the NXT Women's Championship.

This was NXT's only standalone PLE to livestream on YouTube in the United States. NXT's PLEs in the US subsequently moved to The CW starting with The Great American Bash in June and then simulcast on ESPN Unlimited beginning in August. It would also be the final Stand & Deliver to air on Abema in Japan as it merged under Netflix on October 1.

== Production ==
=== Background ===
Stand & Deliver is an annual professional wrestling premium live event (PLE) produced by WWE for its developmental brand, NXT, since 2021 and is considered NXT's biggest event of the year. From that inaugural event in 2021, it was held during WrestleMania week. On February 25, 2026, WWE announced that the sixth Stand & Deliver would take place on Saturday, April 4, 2026, at The Factory at The District in Chesterfield, Missouri, marking the first Stand & Deliver to not be held as part of WrestleMania week, as that year's WrestleMania 42 took place two weeks later on April 18 and 19. Chesterfield is a suburb of St. Louis, with the event promoted as NXT Stand & Deliver: St. Louis. Tickets went on sale on March 4 via Ticketmaster. The event also featured an appearance by St. Louis native and rapper Sexyy Red.

=== Broadcast outlets ===
Ahead of WWE's contract expiration with Peacock for broadcasting NXT's PLEs in the United States, NXT's head of creative Shawn Michaels posted to X on March 11, announcing that Stand & Deliver would be available in the United States on WWE's YouTube channel, marking NXT's first standalone PLE to air on the platform. Outside the US, the event was available on SuperSport in Sub-Saharan Africa, Abema in Japan, and Netflix everywhere else. This was subsequently NXT's first PLE to not air on the WWE Network since it launched in 2014 as the service permanently shut down on April 1 in the last four remaining countries that had still been on the platform due to pre-existing contracts.

=== Storylines ===
The event featured seven matches, including one on the pre-show, that resulted from scripted storylines. Results were predetermined by WWE's writers on the NXT brand, while storylines were produced on WWE's weekly television program, NXT.

On the March 10 episode of NXT, then-Interim General Manager Robert Stone announced that a tag team tournament would take place over the next few weeks, with the finals scheduled for the March 31 episode, with the winners of the tournament facing The Vanity Project (Brad Baylor and Ricky Smokes) for the NXT Tag Team Championship at Stand & Deliver. The tournament was won by Raw's Los Americanos (Bravo Americano and Rayo Americano).

On the March 17 episode of NXT, then-Interim General Manager Robert Stone announced that a Gauntlet Eliminator match would take place on the following episode, with the winner facing Myles Borne for the NXT North American Championship at Stand & Deliver. The match was won by SmackDown's Johnny Gargano, who made his return to NXT for the first time since NXT: Homecoming in September 2025.

At Deadline in December 2025, Evolve's Kendal Grey won the Women's Iron Survivor Challenge to earn an NXT Women's Championship match against Jacy Jayne at NXT: New Year's Evil on January 6, 2026, but failed to win the title after numerous interferences from Jayne's Fatal Influence stablemates, Fallon Henley and Lainey Reid. After that, Grey kept pursuing a rematch with Jayne, and on the March 11 episode of Evolve, after a successful title defense, Grey vacated the WWE Evolve Women's Championship to become a full-time roster member of NXT. On the March 17 episode of NXT, Grey stated her intentions of challenging for the title at Stand & Deliver, however, she was interrupted by one-half of the AAA World Mixed Tag Team Champions, Lola Vice, who stated the same. The following week, after Grey defeated Henley and Reid in a tag team match, Grey once again stated that she would beat Jayne for the title at the event, however, Vice also appeared and once again stated the same. Because of that, then-Interim General Manager Robert Stone announced that Grey would face Vice the following week, where the winner would challenge Jayne for the NXT Women's Championship at Stand & Deliver. During the match, however, Grey pinned Vice to win the match, but at the same moment, Grey also submitted, leaving the winner of the match uncertain. The following night, Stone announced that, after speaking with Shawn Michaels, Jayne would defend the title against both Vice and Grey in a triple threat match.

After several months of dissension, Zaria turned on her tag team partner, Sol Ruca prior to her NXT Women's Championship match against Jacy Jayne on the February 24 episode of NXT. Jayne subsequently defeated Ruca in six seconds to retain the title. The following week, Zaria faced Jayne for the title, but the match ended in a no contest after Ruca attacked both women. This led to a triple threat match for the title on the March 17 episode, where Jayne retained. On the next episode, Ruca challenged Zaria to a match at Stand & Deliver, which Zaria accepted.

On the February 2 episode of NXT, Joe Hendry won the vacant NXT Championship in a ladder match after pushing Ricky Saints off a ladder. During this time, Saints and reigning NXT North American Champion Ethan Page formed an alliance. On the February 24 episode of NXT, Saints attempted to help Page retain the title against Myles Borne, but he was neutralized by Hendry. Page subsequently lost the title. At Vengeance Day, Hendry successfully defended the title against Saints despite Page trying to help. Three days later on NXT, Tony D'Angelo also stated his intentions of challenging for the title while later that night, Page and Saints defeated Hendry and Borne in a tag team match, with Page pinning Hendry. On the next episode, both Page and Saints stated their intentions of challenging for the title. Hendry subsequently appeared, and after pretending a dissension between them, Page and Saints attacked Hendry, however, all three men were attacked by D'Angelo. One week later, D'Angelo and Saints faced each other, but the match ended in a disqualification win for Saints after Page interfered. Hendry subsequently appeared and attacked the three men. Then-Interim NXT General Manager Robert Stone subsequently announced that Hendry would defend the title against D'Angelo, Page, and Saints in a fatal four-way match at Stand & Deliver.

On the March 17 episode of NXT, after Tatum Paxley successfully defended the NXT Women's North American Championship, she was attacked by former champion Blake Monroe, who subsequently stole the title. The following week, Paxley broke into Monroe's hotel room and demanded her to give the title back on the next episode. There, Paxley challenged Monroe to a title match at Stand & Deliver, which Monroe accepted. A brawl subsequently took place, however, Monroe escaped with the title. The match was subsequently made official.

On the March 17 episode of NXT, BirthRight (represented by Uriah Connors and Channing "Stacks" Lorenzo) defeated Hank and Tank (Hank Walker and Tank Ledger) to advance in the NXT Tag Team Championship #1 contenders tournament after interference from their stablemates: Lexis King and TNA Knockouts World Champion Arianna Grace. The following week, Shiloh Hill and BirthRight's Charlie Dempsey participated in the gauntlet eliminator match to determine the #1 contender for the NXT North American Championship at Stand & Deliver. Hill eliminated Dempsey, only to be attacked by BirthRight, which led to his own elimination shortly after. On the next episode, Hill appeared during the finals of the tag team tournament, fending off BirthRight, which ultimately cost Connors and Lorenzo the match. Later that night, Hill approached Hank and Tank, Eli Knight, and WWE Women's Speed Champion Wren Sinclair, and after Ledger pointed out the fact that they did not have a match at Stand & Deliver, Hill stated that he had an idea. Later, NXT General Manager Robert Stone announced that the entirety of BirthRight would face Hill, Hank, Tank, Knight, and Sinclair in a 10-person mixed tag team match on the Countdown to Stand & Deliver: St. Louis pre-show. Following that, Knight's ringname was changed to EK Prosper.

== Event ==
Other on-screen personnel
Role:	Name:
Commentators	Vic Joseph
Commentators	Booker T
Spanish commentators	Marcelo Rodríguez
Spanish commentators	Jerry Soto
Ring announcer	Mike Rome
Referees	Adrian Butler
Referees	Victoria D'Errico
Referees	Chip Danning
Referees	Dallas Irvin
Referees	Derek Sanders
Referees	Felix Fernandez
Interviewers	Sarah Schreiber
Interviewers	Blake Howard
Pre-show panel	Megan Morant
Pre-show panel	Peter Rosenberg

=== Pre-show ===
The Countdown to Stand & Deliver: St. Louis pre-show had one match, which was the 10-person mixed tag team match with the team of Hank and Tank (Hank Walker and Tank Ledger), Shiloh Hill, EK Prosper, and Wren Sinclair facing BirthRight (Channing "Stacks" Lorenzo, Charlie Dempsey, Lexis King, Uriah Connors, and Arianna Grace). All 10 competitors brawled before the bell officially rang. Hank and Tank had the early advantage until Lorenzo tripped Walker with a baseball slide, allowing BirthRight to isolate him. A hot tag was made to Sinclair, who engaged in a sequence with Grace. Prosper cleared the ring with clotheslines and a backflip kick on Connors. Despite interference from King and a Knee Plus from Connors, Sinclair's team regained the momentum after she executed a dragon suplex on Connors and Walker hit a Boss Man Slam on Lorenzo. Then, Prosper executed a tightrope moonsault onto a group of competitors at ringside. Hank and Tank performed the Honk Honk on Dempsey, followed immediately by Hill's Whisper to the Beast to give his team the victory.

=== Preliminary matches ===
The PLE opened with a triple threat match for the NXT Women's Championship with Jacy Jayne (accompanied by Fallon Henley and Lainey Reid) defending the title against Kendal Grey (accompanied by Wren Sinclair) and Lola Vice. Jayne asserted her veteran status before being neutralized by Vice and Grey. Grey engaged in a chain wrestling battle with Vice, and then Jayne threw Grey into the steel steps to regain control. Henley and Reid interfered with a backstabber and a cannonball in the corner for several near-falls. Vice hit a Tower of Power to both opponents. Then, Grey put Jayne in an ankle lock. Sinclair neutralized Henley and Reid with a crossbody to the floor. After Grey hit the Shades of Grey on Vice and Jayne hit the Rolling Encore on Grey, Vice hit Jayne with a spinning backfist to win the NXT Women's Championship, becoming a double champion in the process

Next, The Vanity Project (Ricky Smokes and Brad Baylor) (accompanied by Jackson Drake) defended the NXT Tag Team Championship against Los Americanos (Rayo Americano and Bravo Americano) (accompanied by El Grande Americano). Los Americanos used double-team maneuvers early, including a rope-trap from Rayo and an atomic drop from Bravo. Following a blind tag, Smokes intercepted Rayo with a slingshot spear. Bravo eventually gained the hot tag, executing a deadlift backdrop on both opponents and a helicopter neckbreaker. El Grande attempted to assist the challengers by loading Bravo's mask with a metal plate. However, Smokes intercepted the object and concealed it. Drake struck Bravo, allowing Smokes and Baylor to execute an assisted double stomp to secure the pinfall victory and retain their titles.

Sol Ruca versus Zaria followed. Zaria utilized her size advantage to ground Ruca. Zaria executed a Snake Eyes on the steel steps, while Ruca attempted to gain momentum with a triangle moonsault and a top-rope superkick. Zaria hit a short-arm curb stomp for a near-fall. Ruca responded with a Frankensteiner and a German suplex. The action moved to the entrance ramp, where Ruca executed the Sol Snatcher; however, Zaria was able to respond with a spear in the ring. After Zaria’s back gave out during a fireman's carry attempt, Ruca hit a second Sol Snatcher, which Zaria survived. Zaria subsequently countered a slingshot 450° splash with a spear and an F5 for a two-count. Following an exchange on the top turnbuckle, Ruca executed a Super X-Factor before delivering a third Sol Snatcher to get the pinfall victory.

Next, Myles Borne defended the NXT North American Championship against Johnny Gargano (accompanied by Candice LeRae). Gargano gained early momentum with an armdrag and dropkick combination, followed by a cannonball from the ring apron. Borne gained control by driving Gargano into the announce table and the ring post. Borne maintained a methodical offense with a powerslam for a near-fall. Gargano hit a slingshot spear and a kick, but Borne responded with an Ushigoroshi and a diving clothesline on the entrance ramp. Gargano executed a Willow’s Bell and the One Final Beat DDT for a near-fall, but Borne countered a subsequent Gargano Escape submission attempt into the Borne Again. Despite interference from LeRae and a leverage pin attempt by Gargano, Borne secured the victory after hitting a slingshot followed by the Borne Again. After Gargano and LeRae left, Dion Lennox appeared and hit Borne in the back with a steel chair. He then gave Borne a Tilt-a-Whirl backbreaker on the chair.

In a match for the NXT Women's North American Championship, champion Tatum Paxley competed against Blake Monroe. Paxley began with high-impact offense, including a shotgun dropkick and an inverted Gory stretch. However, Monroe executed a frankensteiner onto the steel entrance ramp, which the champion appeared to have suffered a shoulder injury. Monroe capitalized by targeting Paxley's left arm. Paxley mounted a comeback using single-arm maneuvers. Monroe delivered a sunset flip powerbomb from the apron to the floor, followed by a running knee inside the ring for a near-fall. Monroe exposed the steel of multiple turnbuckles and utilized the championship belt as a weapon while the referee was distracted. After hitting a Michinoku Driver and the Glamour Shot for near-falls, Monroe attempted to drive Paxley into the exposed turnbuckle. Paxley survived the onslaught and countered with a Liger Kick and the Cemetery Drive to retain the championship.

=== Main event ===
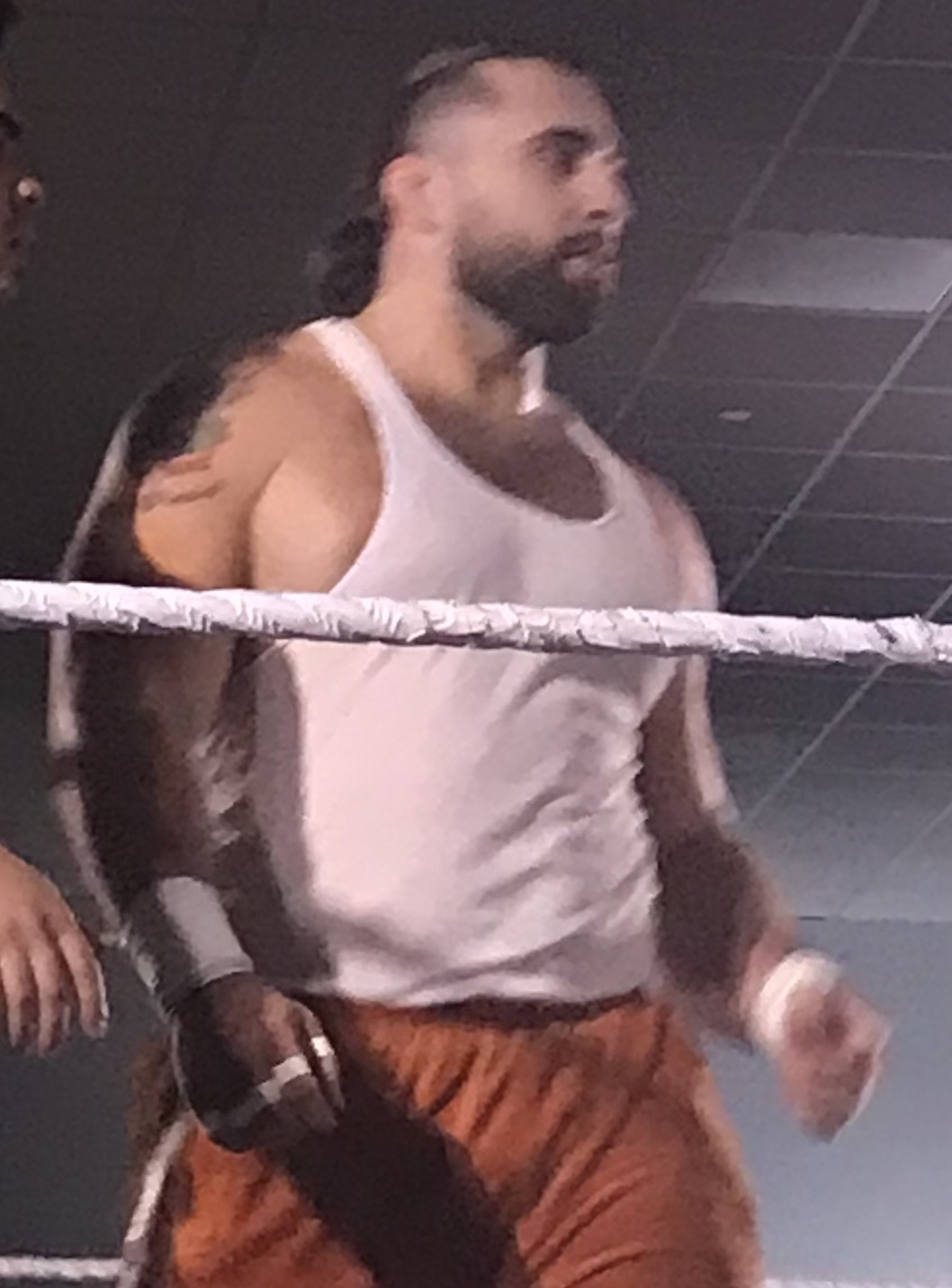
By winning the NXT Championship, Tony D'Angelo simultaneously became an NXT Triple Crown Champion and the first NXT Grand Slam Champion.

The main event was a fatal four-way match for the NXT Championship where champion Joe Hendry defended the title against Ethan Page, Ricky Saints, and Tony D’Angelo. D’Angelo and Hendry worked together to neutralize Page and Saints before the action spilled to ringside. Hendry executed a delayed vertical suplex on Saints. Page and Saints initially formed a tenuous alliance, utilizing tandem offense and isolating Hendry, though the partnership was plagued by frequent bickering over pinfall attempts. Saints executed a superplex on Hendry, only to be immediately crushed by a splash from Page. Saints delivered the Revolution DDT off the steel steps to D’Angelo, followed by Page’s Twisted Grin. Hendry responded with a flurry of power maneuvers, including a Senton Plancha to the floor and double fallaway slams to both D'Angelo and Saints. After Saints struck D’Angelo with a steel chair and hit the Revolution DDT on Hendry, Page cleared the ring by powerslamming Saints through the announce table cover. As Page prepared to slam Saints through the announce table, D’Angelo executed a spear on both Page and Saints, sending all three men through the announce table. Returning to the ring, D'Angelo countered Hendry's Standing Ovation attempt, executing a spear followed by the Dead To Rights to secure the pinfall victory. With this win, D’Angelo began his first reign as NXT Champion and simultaneously became an NXT Triple Crown Champion and NXT Grand Slam Champion.

== Reception ==
According to the Wrestling Observer Newsletter, the YouTube live stream in the United States averaged between 133,000 and 157,000 viewers during its first 90 minutes. The 2025 edition accumulated a total of 200,000 viewers on Netflix throughout that year. Comparatively, the live viewership for Stand & Deliver was lower than the live figures typically generated by Lucha Libre AAA Worldwide (AAA) events on YouTube. However, the event saw significant growth in on-demand viewership following the live broadcast. As of April 2026, Stand & Deliver had surpassed 776,000 total views, significantly outperforming the previous week's AAA stream, which garnered a combined 284,000 views across the WWE and AAA YouTube channels.

The event received generally positive reviews from critics. Chris Mueller of Bleacher Report gave the event an overall grade of B+, characterizing it as a consistently entertaining event during a period of inconsistent quality for WWE programming. Two matches received the event’s highest rating of A−: the NXT Women's Championship triple threat match and the NXT Women's North American Championship match. Mueller praised the triple threat match for its unpredictable nature and high-level performances, specifically identifying Kendal Grey as the standout performer. The NXT Championship fatal four-way match, the NXT Tag Team Championship match, and Sol Ruca versus Zaria all received a B+. Regarding the main event, Mueller commended Tony D’Angelo for delivering one of the strongest performances of his career. While he found the tag team title match entertaining, he suggested it was hindered by excessive comedy bits. The remainder of the card was rated B. Mueller noted that the NXT Women's North American Championship match between Tatum Paxley and Blake Monroe failed to reach the necessary level of intensity. He argued that given the established animosity between the two competitors, a hardcore stipulation would have been a more appropriate choice for the bout.

Manuel Meza Cienfuegos of Yahoo! Sports highlighted both the successes and perceived drawbacks of the event. He named the NXT Women’s Championship triple threat match the best of the event, noting that Lola Vice’s victory was well-deserved after several near-wins. The main event was also lauded for its "thrilling" action and "logical" conclusion; Cienfuegos suggested that Tony D’Angelo gets the opportunity establish himself as a "major star". Sol Ruca versus Zaria was well-received, though Cienfuegos questioned the booking of Zaria's loss, describing it as a "devastating setback" for a character in need of momentum. Conversely, the pre-show match was listed among the night's "worst" segments, although he acknowledged that it was a "dynamic" opener that did not overstay its welcome. Beyond the in-ring action, Cienfuegos noted that as the first Stand & Deliver held away from WrestleMania weekend, the event lacked the TakeOver atmosphere of previous years.

Dave Meltzer of the Wrestling Observer Newsletter gave the pre-show match 3.25 stars, the lowest rating of the event. The NXT Women's North American Championship match and Zaria versus Sol Ruca received 3.5 and 3.75 stars, respectively. The NXT Tag Team Championship match received 4 stars. And three matches received the highest rating of 4.25 stars: the NXT Women's Championship triple threat match, the NXT North American Championship match, and the NXT Championship main event.

Theo Sambus of 411Mania gave the event a 7.5 out of 10 rating, describing it as a "solid" presentation despite being a step down from the previous year. He praised the roster but noted that the "lackluster" crowd and predictable results hampered several moments. The NXT Women's Championship triple threat match was the highest-rated match at 3.75 out of 5 stars. The main event and the NXT North American Championship match both received 3.5 stars; Sambus noted that Myles Borne benefited from a victory over the veteran Johnny Gargano. The NXT Tag Team Championship match and Sol Ruca versus Zaria both earned 3.25 stars. He observed that Ruca versus Zaria lacked the "epic" emotional status it aimed for, suggesting a future "grudge match" might be necessary to settle the feud. The NXT Women’s North American Championship match received 3 stars, with Sambus criticizing Tatum Paxley for "sporadic selling" of her arm injury, which he felt undermined the match’s focal point. The pre-show match was rated 2.5 stars.

== Aftermath ==
This would be NXT's only standalone PLE to broadcast on YouTube in the United States, as The CW (which had already been broadcasting the weekly NXT program since October 2024) would add these events to their lineup beginning with The Great American Bash in June. Subsequently in August, all of NXT's programming began simulcasting on ESPN Unlimited in the US. This would also be the final Stand & Deliver to air on Abema in Japan, which merged under Netflix on October 1.

== Results ==
No.	Results	Stipulations	Times
1^{P}	Hank and Tank (Hank Walker and Tank Ledger), Shiloh Hill, EK Prosper, and Wren Sinclair defeated BirthRight (Lexis King, Channing "Stacks" Lorenzo, Charlie Dempsey, Uriah Connors, and Arianna Grace) by pinfall	10-person mixed tag team match	6:23
2	Lola Vice defeated Jacy Jayne (c) (with Fallon Henley and Lainey Reid) and Kendal Grey (with Wren Sinclair) by pinfall	Triple threat match for the NXT Women's Championship	16:15
3	The Vanity Project (Brad Baylor and Ricky Smokes) (c) (with Jackson Drake) defeated Los Americanos (Bravo Americano and Rayo Americano) (with El Grande Americano) by pinfall	Tag team match for the NXT Tag Team Championship	13:27
4	Sol Ruca defeated Zaria by pinfall	Singles match	13:07
5	Myles Borne (c) defeated Johnny Gargano (with Candice LeRae) by pinfall	Singles match for the NXT North American Championship	14:35
6	Tatum Paxley (c) defeated Blake Monroe by pinfall	Singles match for the NXT Women's North American Championship	13:21
7	Tony D'Angelo defeated Joe Hendry (c), Ricky Saints, and Ethan Page by pinfall	Fatal four-way match for the NXT Championship	16:02
(c) / – the champion(s) heading into the match; P / – the match was broadcast on the pre-show

=== NXT Tag Team Championship #1 Contender's Tournament ===
1st Round; NXT; March 17–24, 2026
BirthRight (Channing "Stacks" Lorenzo and Uriah Connors)	Pinfall
Hank and Tank (Hank Walker and Tank Ledger)	4:33
The Culling (Shawn Spears and Niko Vance)	10:11
Los Americanos (Bravo Americano and Rayo Americano) (Note: Eli Knight and Sean Legacy were originally supposed to be part of the tournament, however, after Legacy suffered an injury on the March 10 episode of NXT, he was not medically cleared to compete, with Elio LeFleur replacing him. However on the March 24 episode, LeFleur and Knight were also unable to compete after being attacked backstage by an unknown assailant, being replaced by Raw's Los Americanos (Bravo Americano and Rayo Americano))	Pinfall

Final; NXT; March 31, 2026
BirthRight	10:45
Los Americanos	Pinfall
