= NXT The Great American Bash (2026) =

WWE premium live event and television special

- Promotional poster featuring Tony D'Angelo, Dion Lennox, Kendal Grey, Tatum Paxley, Naraku, and Lola Vice
- Promotion: WWE
- Brand: NXT
- Date: June 28, 2026
- City: Orlando, Florida
- Venue: WWE Performance Center

WWE event chronology
← Previous; Night of Champions	Next → Saturday Night's Main Event XLV

The Great American Bash chronology
← Previous; 2025	Next → —

NXT major events chronology
← Previous; Stand & Deliver	Next → Heatwave

The 2026 NXT The Great American Bash, also promoted as NXT The Great American Bash: Orlando, was a professional wrestling premium live event (PLE) and television special produced by WWE, held for wrestlers from the promotion's developmental brand, NXT. It was NXT's seventh annual Great American Bash, the 14th produced by WWE, and the 28th overall. The event took place on Sunday, June 28, 2026, at NXT's home venue, the WWE Performance Center in Orlando, Florida.

This was NXT's first PLE to be televised on The CW in the United States, after the channel, which had already been broadcasting the weekly NXT program since October 2024, acquired the rights to NXT's PLEs in the US in April. This in turn marked NXT's first PLE to air on broadcast television. It would also be NXT's only PLE to solely air on The CW in the US as beginning in August, all of NXT's programming began simulcasting on ESPN Unlimited. The event went head-to-head against Forbidden Door, a pay-per-view event co-promoted by All Elite Wrestling, New Japan Pro-Wrestling, Consejo Mundial de Lucha Libre, and World Wonder Ring Stardom.

Seven matches were contested at the event. While primarily held for NXT, the event also featured wrestlers from WWE's sister promotion Lucha Libre AAA Worldwide. In the main event, Kendal Grey defeated Lola Vice to win the NXT Women's Championship. In other prominent matches, Zaria defeated Tatum Paxley to retain the NXT Women's North American Championship, and in the opening bout, Tony D'Angelo defeated Naraku to retain the NXT Championship.

== Production ==
=== Background ===
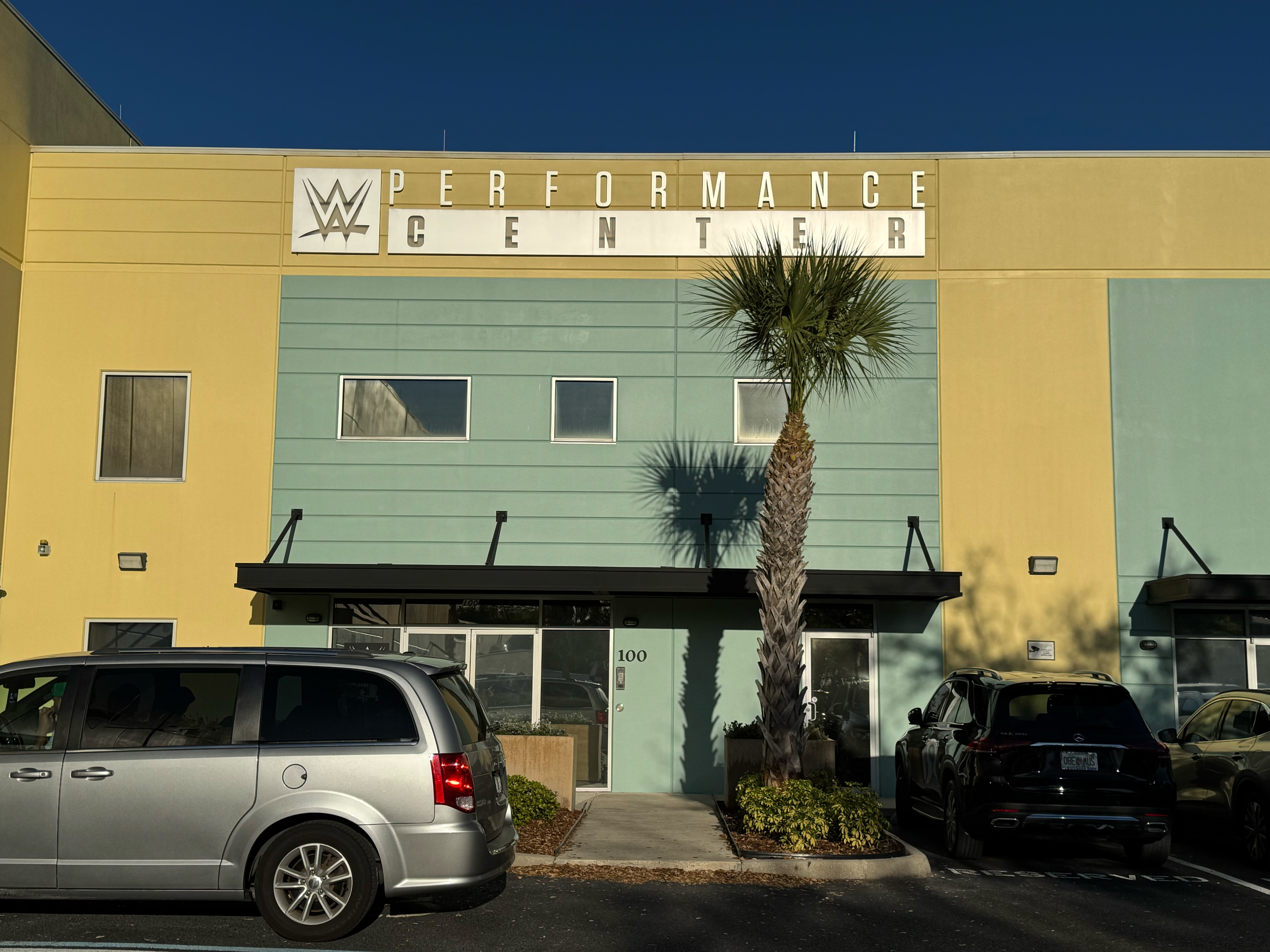
WWE's 14th Great American Bash, and seventh annual for its developmental brand, NXT, was held at the brand's home venue, the WWE Performance Center in Orlando, Florida.

The Great American Bash is a professional wrestling event established in 1985, held during the summer. Following WWE's acquisition of World Championship Wrestling (WCW) in March 2001, WWE revived The Great American Bash as its own pay-per-view (PPV) event in 2004 and it was held annually until 2009. After the 2009 event, which was truncated as The Bash, it was discontinued until it was held once again as a television special of SmackDown in 2012, which returned to using the event's full name. After eight years, WWE reinstated the event in 2020, this time for its developmental brand, NXT, becoming an annual event for the brand.

On June 2, 2026, NXT's head of creative Shawn Michaels announced that NXT's seventh Great American Bash, the 14th produced by WWE, and the 28th overall, would take place on Sunday, June 28, 2026, as a premium live event (PLE), later confirmed to be held at NXT's home venue, the WWE Performance Center in Orlando, Florida, promoted as NXT The Great American Bash: Orlando. On the June 23 episode of NXT, after speaking with Lucha Libre AAA Worldwide (AAA) General Manager Rey Mysterio, NXT General Manager Robert Stone revealed that wrestlers from AAA would appear at The Great American Bash.

The event went head-to-head with rival company All Elite Wrestling's event, Forbidden Door, which was co-promoted with New Japan Pro-Wrestling (NJPW), World Wonder Ring Stardom, and Consejo Mundial de Lucha Libre. Slammiversary, a PPV event by WWE's partner promotion Total Nonstop Action Wrestling (TNA), was also planned for the same evening, but TNA moved its start time up to avoid counter programming.

=== Broadcast outlets ===
Following the end of WWE's contract with Peacock in mid-March 2026 for airing NXT's PLEs in the United States, and after NXT's previous PLE, Stand & Deliver, aired on YouTube in early April, later that month on April 28, WWE announced a new multi-year broadcasting deal for NXT in the United States in which 20 PLEs would air on The CW's linear channel beginning with The Great American Bash; this expanded on an existing deal, as the weekly NXT program had been airing on the network since October 2024. Outside of the US, the event was livestreamed on Abema in Japan, SuperSport in Sub-Saharan Africa, and Netflix everywhere else.

=== Storylines ===
The event included seven matches that resulted from scripted storylines. Results were predetermined by WWE's writers on the NXT brand, while storylines were produced on WWE's weekly television program, NXT.

On the April 21 episode of NXT, NXT Champion Tony D'Angelo received a white box with the Kanji symbol for war on it. The following week, Naraku, previously known as Evil in NJPW, made his WWE debut, confronting D'Angelo with a flag containing the same Kanji symbol. After he left, D'Angelo was attacked by Tavion Heights and a debuting Mason Rook. On the May 26 episode, D'Angelo challenged Naraku, demanding that he openly admit his desire for a title shot. Naraku declared his intention to keep D'Angelo as champion so they could face off. Later that night, Naraku warned Rook not to interfere in D'Angelo's title defense against Kam Hendrix the following week. On that next episode, Naraku and Rook thwarted Hendrix's attempt to illegally use weapons during his NXT Championship challenge against D'Angelo, who successfully retained the title. The following week, Naraku and Rook fought to determine D'Angelo's challenger for the NXT Championship at The Great American Bash, with Naraku emerging victorious. Later that night, Naraku gave D'Angelo a card containing a yellow Kanji symbol, inviting him to a battle.

On the May 12 episode of NXT, Kelani Jordan and Kendal Grey, accompanied by an injured Wren Sinclair, battled each other in the ring. During their match, Izzi Dame and NXT Women's Champion Lola Vice brawled from backstage to ringside, accidentally tripping Sinclair and distracting Grey. After losing to Grey, Jordan shoved Vice for hitting her injured ally before Dame knocked Vice out. The following week, Jordan, Grey, and Dame argued over who deserved to get a shot at the NXT Women's Championship. Vice announced that Dame would received her title shot the following episode. While Jordan was vocally furious at Vice's decision, Sinclair blindsided Jordan with her crutch. On the May 26 episode, Vice successfully retained the NXT Women's Championship against Dame. On the June 9 episode, Grey defeated Jordan to earn the right to challenge Vice for the NXT Women's Championship at The Great American Bash.

NXT North American Champion Myles Borne and Tavion Heights were both members of No Quarter Catch Crew. They left the stable to pursue singles opportunities after each of them defeated Charlie Dempsey on the June 3 and July 29, 2025, episodes of NXT, respectively. The following year on the May 19 episode, Borne and Tony D'Angelo faced off against Mason Rook and Kam Hendrix. Heights ran out to assist Borne but accidentally knocked Hendrix into Borne, allowing Rook and Hendrix to attack Borne and secure the victory. Later that night, Borne and Heights had a heated argument backstage, after which Heights stormed off. On the June 2 episode, Borne and Heights lost against DarkState (Dion Lennox and Osiris Griffin). After the match, Borne helped Heights stand up, but Heights shoved him away. The following week, Heights challenged Borne to a match for the NXT North American Championship at The Great American Bash. Jackson Drake appeared to state his dislike for Borne giving title matches to his friends. Heights then challenged Drake to a #1 contender's match for Borne's title. Their match took place a week later. During the match, Borne helped Heights fend off Drake's Vanity Project stablemates, Brad Baylor and Ricky Smokes, which allowed Heights to defeat Drake and earn the right to challenge Borne at The Great American Bash. When Borne raised Heights's arm after the match, Heights pulled away, stating that he could have won on his own.

On the June 16 episode of NXT, Izzi Dame and Arianna Grace were victorious in the first round of the #1 contender's tournament to the WWE Women's Speed Championship. The following week, Grace defeated Dame after Dame got distracted by her Culling stablemate Shawn Spears, thus Grace earned the right to challenge Wren Sinclair for the title at The Great American Bash.

At Vengeance Day on February 15, 2025, Dion Lennox and Saquon Shugars, along with Cutler James and Osiris Griffin, debuted as the stable, DarkState. At Halloween Havoc that year on October 25, Lennox and Griffin won the NXT Tag Team Championship, but Lennox relinquished his half of the title to Shugars on the December 2 episode of NXT to pursue singles championships. The following year on the February 24 episode, Shugars and Griffin lost the tag title to The Vanity Project (Brad Baylor and Ricky Smokes). On the May 19 episode, Lennox and Shugars challenged The Vanity Project for the title with Shugars taking the pin. After the match, Lennox, Griffin, and James attacked Shugars, kicking the "weak link" out of the stable. On the June 2 episode, Shugars attacked James with a bat as DarkState made their entrance. A week later, Shugars caused a distraction that led to Lennox suffering a loss. On the June 11 episode, a match between Shugars and Lennox was announced for The Great American Bash.

== Event ==
Other on-screen personnel
Role:	Name:
Commentators	Vic Joseph
Commentators	Wade Barrett
Spanish commentators	Marcelo Rodríguez
Spanish commentators	Jerry Soto
Ring announcer	Mike Rome
Referees	Victoria D'Errico
Referees	Chip Danning
Referees	Derek Sanders
Referees	Felix Fernandez
Referees	Jeremy Marcus
Referees	Eddie Franken
Interviewers	Emily Agard
Pre-show panel	Megan Morant
Pre-show panel	Sam Roberts

=== Preliminary matches ===
The PLE opened with Tony D'Angelo, with a bandaged eye, defending the NXT Championship against Naraku. D'Angelo immediately blindsided Naraku and speared him through the side entrance. Naraku retreated, but as D'Angelo was on pursuit, Naraku kicked him in the injured eye; Naraku proceeded to his injured eye. The referee checked D'Angelo's condition, contemplating whether to stop the match, but D'Angelo insisted on continuing. He briefly fought back, but Naraku later threw D'Angelo threw the barricade. D'Angelo prevented a superplex and responded with a running powerbomb, leading to a comeback. When Naraku executed a German suplex, D'Angelo immediately got up and connected with Forget About It to retain the title.

Next, Zaria defended the NXT Women's North American Championship against Tatum Paxley. Both competitors got into a tug-of-war with the championship belt, which caused them to collide. When Zaria had the momentum, Paxley mounted a brief comeback until Zaria headbutted her. After Zaria threw Paxley over the barricade, Paxley immediately got back up and locked in a rear-naked choke from behind the barricade before climbing onto Zaria's back, prompting Zaria to drop backward on the floor. Paxley powerbombed Zaria on the floor and grabbed the championship belt. After Zaria avoided getting hit with the title belt, Paxley performed the Cemetery Drive on the floor, followed by another Cemetery Drive in the ring for a near-fall. Paxley tried the move again, but Zaria countered it into a failed F5 attempt. Zaria responded with a spear and an F5 for a near-fall. She then connected with a curb stomp and an F5 to retain the title.

The battle between Shiloh Hill and Tristan Angels ensued. Hill had the advantage early until Angels established control with a double stomp. When Hill hid underneath the ring, Angels pursued him; Hill grabbed Angels' leg and dragged him underneath. The broadcast switched to a camera angle beneath the ring. Angels answered a ringing cell phone, hearing a voice repeatedly saying, "The fog is coming." Hill, now wearing a hockey mask, ambushed Angels with a chokehold. Angels escaped and attacked Hill with an electrical cable before fleeing back to ringside. Hill reapplied the chokehold, but Angels broke free and later evaded a diving attack. Angels then placed the steel steps in the center of the ring apron. Hill used the steel steps to spring upward and counter Angels' dive with a spear. Hill then dove, but Angels countered with a Codebreaker for a near-fall. As both men battled on the top turnbuckle, Hill executed Whisper of the Beast to get the pinfall victory.

In a match with a five-minute time limit, Wren Sinclair defended the WWE Women's Speed Championship against Arianna Grace, who was accompanied by her BirthRight stablemates, including Charlie Dempsey. Grace was in control in the first 90 seconds. In the final minute, Sinclair mounted a comeback until Dempsey caused a distraction. Sinclair knocked Dempsey off the apron, but this allowed Grace to put her in a small package for a near-fall. Sinclair countered Grace and applied the Final Wrench, forcing Grace to tap out with 11 seconds left to retain the title.

Next, Dion Lennox battled his former DarkState stablemate Saquon Shugars. The two immediately brawled, with Shugars establishing control early. Lennox targeted Shugar's previously injured back. When Shugars halted the onslaught. DarkState members Cutler James and Osiris Griffin appeared, and then Lennox capitalized on the distraction to gain the advantage. Shugars mounted a comeback, later ascending the turnbuckles, but Lennox dropped Shugars back-first onto the turnbuckle. Lennox delivered a modified powerslam and clotheslines for near-falls. Shugars attempted to life Lennox but lost his grip due to his back injury. Shugars scaled the turnbuckles and landed a reverse diving splash to defeat Lenox. After the match, James and Griffin ambushed Shugars, executing a double powerbomb. They then allowed Lennox to attack Shugars with a baseball bat.

The penultimate match was for the NXT North American Championship with reigning champion Myles Borne defending the title against Tavion Heights. The two had a grappling exchange to open the match before Borne dropkicked Heights over the top rope. Heights executed a series of suplexes and various holds. After striking Borne's throat, Heights threw him over the top rope. Back in the ring, Heights performed a belly-to-back suplex for a near-fall. Borne mounted a comeback until Heights hit him with an overhead belly-to-belly suplex to the outside. Back in the ring, heights put Borne in a fireman's carry; however, Borne countered and connected with the Borne Again to retain the title.

=== Main event ===
In the main event, Lola Vice defended the NXT Women's Championship against Kendal Grey. The match opened with chain-wrestling and mat-grappling. Vice's combination of kicks and strikes gave her the early advantage until Grey countered with technical grappling. Kelani Jordan appeared at ringside, who was quickly intercepted by Wren Sinclair; the two engaged in a brawl towards backstage. While Grey was distracted on the ring apron, Vice knocked her down to the floor. Vice executed a series of German suplexes until the two began trading punches and submission reversals later on in the match. Grey missed a moonsault, which allowed Vice to hit her with a spinning back kick for a near-fall. Vice applied a guillotine choke that she transitioned into a triangle choke. Grey escaped by hitting Vice with a backfist for a simultaneous near-fall. Grey connected with the Shades of Grey to become the new NXT Women's Champion.

== Aftermath ==
This would be NXT's only PLE to solely air on The CW in the US as beginning in August, all of NXT's programming began simulcasting on ESPN Unlimited.

== Results ==
No.	Results	Stipulations	Times
1	Tony D'Angelo (c) defeated Naraku by pinfall	Singles match for the NXT Championship	10:12
2	Zaria (c) defeated Tatum Paxley by pinfall	Singles match for the NXT Women's North American Championship	14:09
3	Shiloh Hill defeated Tristan Angels by pinfall	Singles match	13:07
4	Wren Sinclair (c) defeated Arianna Grace (with Lexis King, Channing "Stacks" Lorenzo, Charlie Dempsey, and Uriah Connors) by submission	Singles match for the WWE Women's Speed Championship	4:49
5	Saquon Shugars defeated Dion Lennox by pinfall	Singles match	14:21
6	Myles Borne (c) defeated Tavion Heights by pinfall	Singles match for the NXT North American Championship	17:15
7	Kendal Grey defeated Lola Vice (c) by pinfall	Singles match for the NXT Women's Championship	15:13
(c) / – the champion(s) heading into the match

=== WWE Women's Speed Championship #1 Contender's Tournament ===
1st Round; NXT; June 16, 2026
NXT	Arianna Grace	Pinfall
Evolve	Layla Diggs	2:46
NXT	Izzi Dame	Pinfall
NXT	Thea Hail	2:20

Final; NXT; June 23, 2026
NXT	Arianna Grace	Pinfall
NXT	Izzi Dame	2:19

Championship match The Great American Bash; June 28, 2026
NXT	Wren Sinclair (c)	Submission
NXT	Arianna Grace	4:45
