= Tony D'Angelo =

American professional wrestler (born 1995)

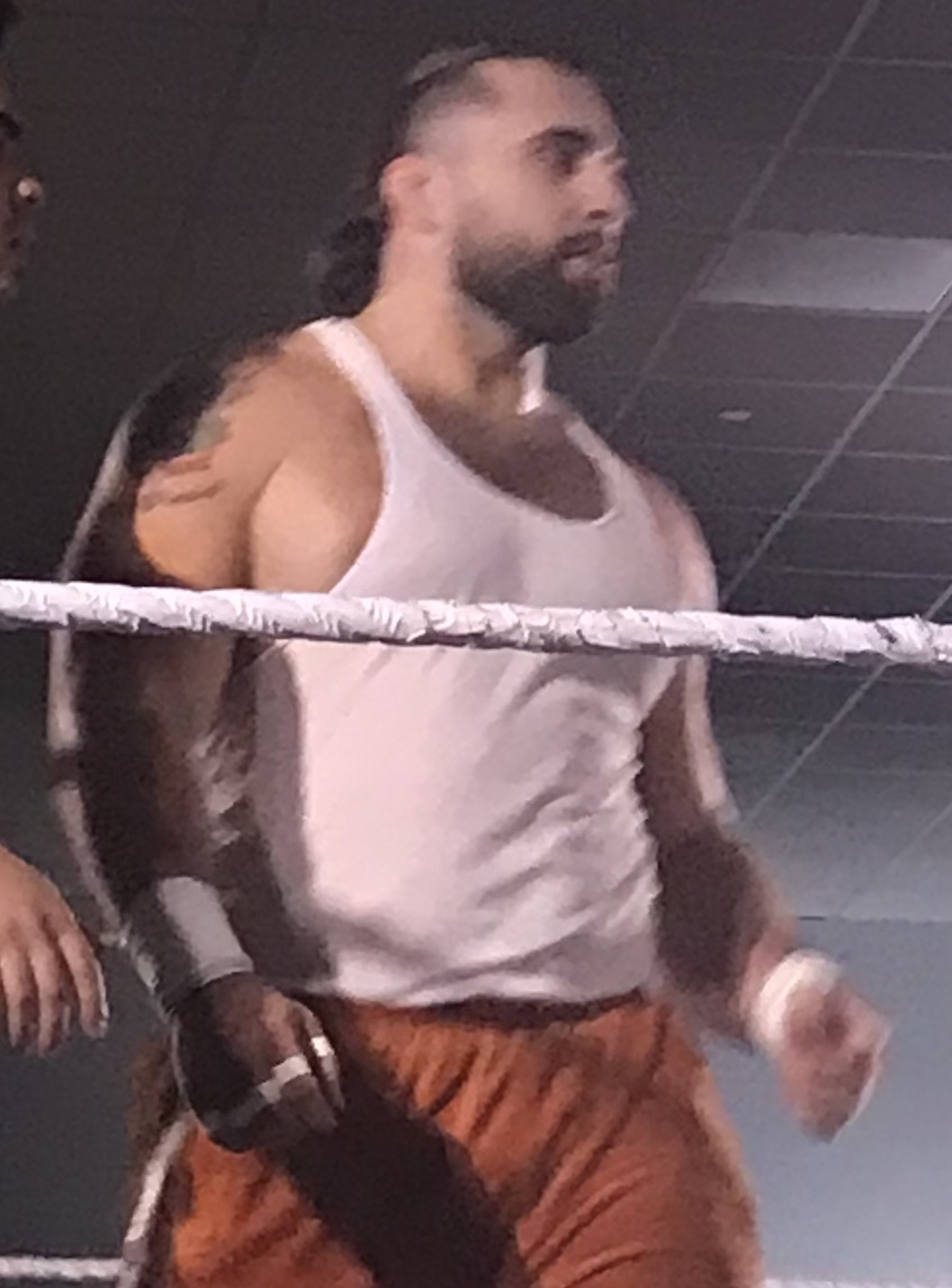
- D'Angelo in 2024

Personal information
- Born: Joseph Ariola; June 9, 1995 (age 31) Oak Park, Illinois, U.S.
- Spouse: Isabella Borini (m. 2024)
- Children: 1

Professional wrestling career
- Ring name(s): Joey Ariola; Tony D'Angelo
- Billed height: 6 ft 0 in (183 cm)
- Billed weight: 240 lb (109 kg)
- Billed from: Chicago, Illinois
- Trained by: WWE Performance Center
- Debut: November 9, 2019

Joseph Ariola (born June 9, 1995) is an American professional wrestler. He is signed to WWE, where he performs on the NXT brand under the ring name Tony D'Angelo or simply Tony D.

D’Angelo is a former one-time NXT Champion, a one-time NXT North American Champion, a two-time NXT Tag Team Champion, and a one-time NXT Heritage Cup Champion making him the third NXT Triple Crown Champion and first-ever NXT Grand Slam Champion.

== Early life ==
Joseph Ariola was born on June 9, 1995, in Oak Park, Illinois. Ariola attended Oak Park and River Forest High School, where he won the 182-pound weight class at the 2013 IHSA Class 3A Individual State Wrestling Tournament with a 47-1 record, becoming their second consecutive state champion. He was also a collegiate wrestler for the University at Buffalo.

== Professional wrestling career ==
=== Independent circuit (2019–2021) ===
Ariola made his professional wrestling debut on November 9, 2019, under the ring name Joey Ariola at the WrestleRage 17 event held by POWW Entertainment, teaming with Joey Cece against Dave Rydell and Jeff Luxon in a tag team match that ended in a double count out. On March 7, 2020, at the Slamfest 17 event, Ariola and Cece defeated Rydell and Luxon to win the POWW Tag Team Championship, which they held until Cece lost it in a handicap match on July 4 against The Plague (BOW & Machine).

=== WWE (2021–present) ===
==== Early beginnings (2021–2022) ====
On February 24, 2021, Ariola signed a developmental contract with WWE, reporting to the WWE Performance Center and subsequently the NXT brand. He made his in-ring debut on the October 5, 2021 episode of NXT under the ring name Tony D'Angelo, with the heel gimmick of an Italian-American mafia, defeating Malik Blade. On December 5, at NXT WarGames, Team 2.0 (D'Angelo, Bron Breakker, Carmelo Hayes and Grayson Waller) defeated Team Black & Gold (Johnny Gargano, LA Knight, Pete Dunne and Tommaso Ciampa) in a WarGames match. He suffered his first loss against Dunne on the December 21 episode of NXT, brutally attacking him with a crowbar after the match. D'Angelo defeated Dunne in a Crowbar On a Pole match on the January 11, 2022 episode of NXT, but lost to him in a Weaponized Steel Cage match on February 15 at NXT: Vengeance Day, ending their feud. On April 2, at NXT Stand & Deliver, D'Angelo defeated Ciampa in the latter's final match in NXT.

==== The D'Angelo Family (2022–2025) ====
On the April 26 episode of NXT, D'Angelo introduced Channing "Stacks" Lorenzo and Troy "Two Dimes" Donovan as his henchmen who attacked Santos Escobar the previous week. They formed a stable called The D'Angelo Family, defeating Legado del Fantasma (Escobar, Cruz Del Toro and Joaquin Wilde) at NXT In Your House on June 4; per the stipulation, Legado del Fantasma had to join The D'Angelo Family. On June 11, Two Dimes was released by WWE. Throughout the following months, Escobar cost D'Angelo matches against Hayes for the NXT North American Championship and The Creed Brothers for the NXT Tag Team Championship, leading to a Street Fight at NXT: Heatwave on August 16, where D'Angelo defeated Escobar to end their feud; per the stipulation, Legado del Fantasma had to remain linked to The D'Angelo Family while Escobar had to (kayfabe) leave NXT.

D'Angelo unsuccessfully challenged Wes Lee for the NXT North American Championship on the December 27 episode of NXT after a distraction from Dijak. The following week, he turned face by challenging Dijak to a match at NXT: New Year's Evil on January 10, 2023, but lost. He then defeated Dijak on the March 7 at NXT: Roadblock in a Jailhouse Street Fight. At NXT Stand & Deliver on April 1, D'Angelo and Stacks failed to win the NXT Tag Team Championship in a triple threat match. After defeating Pretty Deadly in a trunk match at Spring Breakin' on April 23, they defeated Gallus to win the NXT Tag Team Championship on July 30 at NXT The Great American Bash. At NXT No Mercy on September 30, D'Angelo and Stacks retained the titles against Out the Mud (Lucien Price and Bronco Nima), The Creed Brothers, and Angel Garza and Humberto Carrillo in a fatal four-way tag team match. On the October 24 episode of NXT: Halloween Havoc, D'Angelo and Stacks lost the titles to Chase University (Andre Chase and Duke Hudson), ending their first reign at 86 days, but they regained the title on the November 14 episode of NXT. During this time, Adriana Rizzo became a part of the D'Angelo Family, feuding with Price, Nima and Jaida Parker of OTM, whom they defeated in a six-person mixed tag team match at NXT Vengeance Day on February 4. On the February 13, 2024 episode of NXT, D'Angelo and Stacks lost the titles to Dusty Rhodes Tag Team Classic winners Bron Breakker and Baron Corbin, ending their second reign at 91 days.

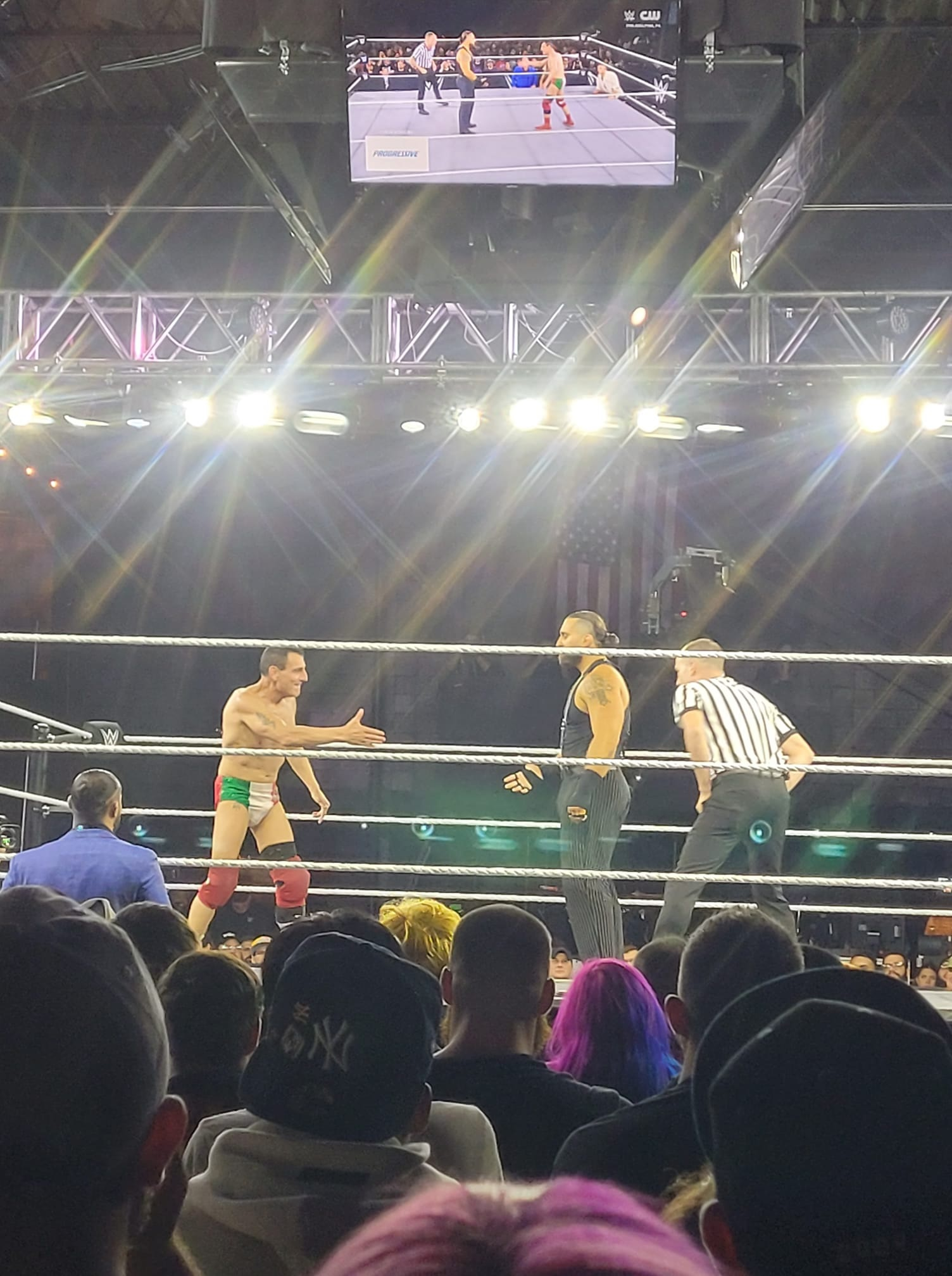
D'Angelo (right) facing Nunzio at NXT 2300 in November 2024

On the February 27 episode of NXT, D'Angelo interrupted the contract signing between Hayes and NXT Champion Ilja Dragunov, willing to earn a title shot at the NXT Championship. NXT General Manager Ava set a match between Hayes and D'Angelo on March 5 at NXT: Roadblock to determine who would face Dragunov for the NXT Championship at NXT Stand & Deliver on April 6. At NXT: Roadblock, D'Angelo introduced Luca Crusifino as the "consigliere" of The D'Angelo Family and used Trick Williams' entrance music to distract and defeat Hayes. He failed to win the title from Dragunov at NXT Stand & Deliver. On the April 16 episode of NXT, D'Angelo revealed that his Family were hired by No Quarter Catch Crew (Charlie Dempsey, Damon Kemp and Myles Borne) to (kayfabe) take out their leader Drew Gulak. D'Angelo demanded payment for the job but NQCC refused, causing a brawl between the two factions and resulting in a six-man tag team match between the two factions at Spring Breakin' on April 23, which was won by The D'Angelo Family. On the May 7 episode of NXT, Dempsey and Borne faced Tyson Dupont and Tyriek Igwe. Before the match started, the referee was declared "unavailable" and Stacks was announced as the special guest referee, costing Dempsey and Borne the match through a fast count. After the match, an irate Dempsey gave D'Angelo a title shot at the NXT Heritage Cup as payment due to the D'Angelo Family and invoked the Catch Clause, which was then nullified when D'Angelo and his Family kidnapped Kemp and Borne later that night. On the following episode of NXT, D'Angelo defeated Dempsey 2–1 in British Rounds Rules to win the Cup, his first singles championship in WWE. He retained the Cup against Tavion Heights on July 30 at Week 1 of NXT: The Great American Bash, but lost it back to Dempsey on the August 13 episode of NXT after outside interference from Wren Sinclair, ending his reign at 91 days.

At NXT No Mercy on September 1, D'Angelo failed to win the NXT North American Championship from Oba Femi, but won the title in a rematch on the October 8 episode of NXT, ending Femi's record-setting title reign at 273 days. At Halloween Havoc on October 27, D'Angelo defeated Femi in a Tables, Ladders and Scares match to retain the title. At NXT 2300 on November 6, he successfully defended the title against Nunzio. In early 2025, The D'Angelo Family started a feud with Shawn Spears and his stable over Izzi Dame. However, after retaining the title against Ridge Holland in a steel cage match on the February 11 episode of NXT, Dame turned on D'Angelo. On the March 4 episode of NXT, D'Angelo lost the title to Spears, ending his reign at 147 days.

At NXT Stand & Deliver on April 19, 2025, during the six-man tag team match between The D'Angelo Family and DarkState (Dion Lennox, Saquon Shugars and Osiris Griffin), Lorenzo turned on D'Angelo after months of D'Angelo distrusting Lorenzo. At Battleground on May 25, D’Angelo lost to Lorenzo due to a distraction from Luca Crusifino. On the June 25 episode of NXT, D'Angelo lost to Lorenzo in a match for the vacant NXT Heritage Cup after Crusifino accidentally hit D'Angelo in the back with a bucket. The following week, Crusifino attacked them both after a face-off and left The D'Angelo Family. On the July 15 episode of NXT, D'Angelo defeated Lorenzo and Crusifino in a triple threat match, ending their feud and effectively disbanding The D'Angelo Family stable.

==== Singles competition (2025–present) ====
On the July 29 episode of NXT, D'Angelo appeared in a pre-taped segment where he appeared to retire his "Don" persona and was confronted by a shadowy figure hidden to the audience. After a five-month hiatus, D'Angelo returned at NXT Deadline on December 6, attacking the 2025 Men's Iron Survivor Challenge winner Je'Von Evans and stared down NXT Champion Oba Femi. On the following episode of NXT, he attacked NXT North American Champion Ethan Page, cementing himself as a tweener. D'Angelo subsequently continued his feud with DarkState, costing Griffin and Shugars the NXT Tag Team Championship and defeating Lennox at NXT Vengeance Day on March 7, 2026.

Afterwards, D'Angelo set his sights on the NXT Championship. At Stand & Deliver on April 4, D'Angelo won the title from Joe Hendry in a fatal four-way match also involving Page and Ricky Saints, becoming the third NXT Triple Crown Champion and the first NXT Grand Slam Champion in the process. From June to July, D'Angelo feuded Naraku. He would successfully defended his title against Naraku twice: first at The Great American Bash on June 28, and then on the July 2 episode of NXT in a Street Fight. After defeating Naraku, D'Angelo was confronted by the newest NXT signee Cruz Montana. At NXT Heatwave on August 30, D'Angelo lost the title to Grayson Waller in a fatal four-way match also consisting of Montana and latest NXT signee Zilla Fatu, ending his reign at 147 days. On the 8 September episode of NXT, D'Angelo, Mason Rook, and Saquon Shugars defeated Cruz Montana, EK Prosper, and Keanu Carver in a Six-Man Tag Team match to qualify for the NXT Championship No. 1 contender's Triple Threat match the following week, which was won by Rook who pinned D'Angelo for the victory. At NXT Halloween Havoc on October 31, D'Angelo failed to regain the title from Waller.

== Other media ==
Ariola, as Tony D'Angelo, made his video game debut as a playable character in WWE 2K23 and has since appeared in WWE 2K24, WWE 2K25, and WWE 2K26. He also appeared on the premiere episode of the second season of the television series Wild Cards in February 2025 as the character "Jaws".

== Personal life ==
Ariola is of Italian descent, particularly having Sicilian roots, which he has incorporated into his initial professional wrestling gimmick as “The Don”, a stereotypical Mafia. Ariola married Isabella Borini in December 2024. Their son named Vincenzo James was born on July 7, 2026.

== Championships and accomplishments ==
- POWW Entertainment
  - POWW Tag Team Championship (1 time) – with Joey Cece
- Pro Wrestling Illustrated
  - Ranked No. 47 of the top 500 singles wrestlers in the PWI 500 in 2026
- WWE
  - NXT Championship (1 time)
  - NXT North American Championship (1 time)
  - NXT Tag Team Championship (2 times) – with Channing "Stacks" Lorenzo
  - NXT Heritage Cup (1 time)
  - Third NXT Triple Crown Champion
  - First NXT Grand Slam Champion
