= Tatum Paxley =

American professional wrestler (born 1996)

Personal information
- Born: Natalie Elizabeth Holland; October 29, 1996 (age 30) Dallas, Texas, U.S.
- Spouse: Javier Bernal (m. 2024)

Professional wrestling career
- Ring name: Tatum Paxley
- Billed height: 5 ft 5 in (165 cm)
- Billed weight: 121 lb (55 kg)
- Billed from: Dallas, Texas
- Trained by: WWE Performance Center
- Debut: February 15, 2022

Natalie Elizabeth Beidelschies (née Holland; born October 29, 1996) is an American professional wrestler. As of August 2021, she is signed to WWE, where she performs on the SmackDown brand under the ring name Tatum Paxley.

Prior to becoming a professional wrestler, Holland was a successful powerlifter, winning the USA Powerlifting (USAPL) championship multiple times. In WWE, she is a former one-time NXT Women's Champion, a one-time NXT Women's North American Champion and a one-time WWE Women's Tag Team Champion alongside Alexa Bliss.

== Early life ==
Natalie Elizabeth Holland was born on October 29, 1996 in Dallas, Texas. Holland's athletic experience includes cheerleading and powerlifting. She is a former two-time USA Powerlifting (USAPL) champion, winning competitions in 2019 and 2021.

== Professional wrestling career ==
=== WWE (2021–present) ===
===== NXT debut, various feuds and alliances (2021–2025) =====
Holland signed a contract with WWE in August 2021, after participating in physical tests carried out by the company. To begin her training, she reported to the WWE Performance Center. On the January 25, 2022, episode of WWE NXT, her first speaking role would be in a backstage segment involving Cora Jade and Raquel González.

On February 15, on the debut episode of NXT Level Up, she made her in-ring debut as a face under the ring name Tatum Paxley, teaming with Ivy Nile of Diamond Mine, and scoring a victory over Fallon Henley and Kayla Inlay. On the February 22 episode of NXT, Paxley and Nile participated in the first round of the women's Dusty Rhodes Tag Team Classic against Kacy Catanzaro and Kayden Carter, in which they were defeated. Now a formalized tag team, Paxley and Nile engaged in a fatal four-way tag team match against Katana Chance and Carter, Valentina Feroz, and Yulisa Leon, and Toxic Attraction (Gigi Dolin and Jacy Jayne) on the August 2 episode of NXT for the vacant NXT Women's Tag Team Championship, which they failed to win. After feeling morally abandoned by Nile, on the March 14, 2023, episode of NXT, Paxley abandoned Nile during a three-way tag team match, leaving her to suffer the pinfall by Alba Fyre and Isla Dawn of The Unholy Union, thus turning heel. On the April 4 episode of NXT, Paxley was defeated by Nile, and would only appear sporadically on NXT and mostly be on NXT Level Up.

On the November 28, 2023, edition of NXT Paxley interrupted a segment involving, NXT Women's Champion Lyra Valkyria and Fallon Henley. Paxley took on the character of a deranged creep and began a storyline where she stalked Valkyria during backstage interviews and during her matches. Paxley turned face at NXT: New Year's Evil on January 2, 2024, after saving Valkyria from a beatdown by Lola Vice and Elektra Lopez, eventually developing an obsession with Valkyria and began to interfere in her matches much to Valkyria’s disapproval. At NXT: Roadblock on March 5, Valkyria and Paxley faced The Kabuki Warriors for the WWE Women's Tag Team Championship, where they failed to win the titles after Valkyria inadvertently kicked Paxley. On the April 9 episode of NXT, after NXT Stand & Deliver where Valkyria lost the NXT Women's Championship to Roxanne Perez, Paxley turned on Valkyria and reverted to a heel. On the following weeks episode of NXT, Paxley revealed that her obsession with Valkyria was only because she had the NXT Women's Championship. At week 1 of Spring Breakin' on April 23, Paxley faced Valkyria and Perez in a triple threat match for the NXT Women’s Championship where Perez retained the title. Valkyria was subsequently promoted to the Raw brand in the 2024 WWE Draft the following week, ending the feud between the two.

On the May 28 episode of NXT, Paxley took on Michin to qualify for a spot in the six-woman ladder match to crown the inaugural NXT Women's North American Champion at NXT Battleground, where she lost. In July, Paxley formed a short-lived alliance with Wendy Choo, who turned on Paxley at Week 2 of NXT: The Great American Bash on August 6 after Paxley failed to defeat NXT Women's North American Champion Kelani Jordan for the title. On the September 3 episode of NXT, Paxley defeated Rosemary, a wrestler signed to Total Nonstop Action Wrestling (TNA) who had aligned with Choo. After the match, Paxley was attacked by Choo and Rosemary. Valkyria returned to NXT to save Paxley and the pair reunited, turning Paxley face once more. On the October 22 episode of NXT, after losing a match against Jaida Parker, Paxley was stuffed into a loading box by Choo. At NXT Halloween Havoc on October 27, Paxley spun the Spin the Wheel, Make the Deal wheel, and the first ever women's casket match in WWE was scheduled between herself and Choo, which was won by Paxley two days later to end their feud.

On the November 26 episode of NXT, Paxley challenged Henley for the NXT Women's North American Championship but failed to win the title. After the match, she was attacked by Henley and her Fatal Influence stablemates (Jayne and Nyx). Paxley was then saved by a returning Dolin and formed an alliance with her. The following week, Paxley and Dolin lost to Jayne and Nyx in a tag team match. After the match, Shotzi saved the pair from a beatdown by Fatal Influence. The two teams would face off at NXT: New Year's Evil on January 7, 2025, where Paxley, Dolin and Shotzi emerged victorious. At the NXT Stand & Deliver pre-show on April 19, Paxley and Dolin won a fatal four-way tag team elimination match to become the No. 1 contenders for the WWE Women's Tag Team Championship; they failed to defeat Liv Morgan and Raquel Rodriguez for the titles on the April 22 episode of NXT. The alliance of Paxley, Dolin and Shotzi effectively ended in May when the latter two were among a wave of mass WWE departures, with Dolin being released and Shotzi's contract expiring.

===== The Culling and championship reigns (2025–2026) =====
On the May 13 episode of NXT, Paxley reverted back to a heel during a match with Thea Hail, when Paxley lost due to disqualification for gouging Hail's eye and continued to attack her after the match had ended. Paxley then entered into a storyline with Izzi Dame, where Dame attempted to recruit Paxley into The Culling stable. On the July 1 episode of NXT, Paxley teamed with Dame to defeat Zaria and Sol Ruca, and joined The Culling. At Evolution on July 13, Paxley and Dame entered the 20-woman battle royal for a women's world championship match at Clash in Paris but the pair were immediately eliminated at the start of the match by Nia Jax. On the July 22 episode of NXT, The Culling (Paxley, Dame, Shawn Spears, and Niko Vance) defeated NXT Tag Team Champions Hank and Tank (Hank Walker and Tank Ledger), Zaria, and Sol Ruca in an eight-person mixed tag team match in The Culling's first match as a whole stable, with Paxley picking up the win. On the August 5 episode of NXT, Paxley challenged Ruca for the NXT Women's North American Championship but failed to win the title.

On October 14 episode of NXT, Paxley won a battle royal to become the No. 1 contender for the NXT Women's Championship by last eliminating Dame and Jordynne Grace, with her former tag team partner Lyra Valkyria joining the ring to celebrate with her, seemingly turning Paxley to a tweener in the process. At Halloween Havoc on October 25, Paxley defeated Jayne to win the title. Paxley then agreed to give Jayne her rematch, on the promise that Jayne could never challenge for the title again if she were to lose. At NXT Gold Rush on November 18, Paxley lost the title back to Jayne after Dame turned on her, ending her reign at 24 days. This marks the shortest reign in the title's history. Paxley was subsequently exiled from The Culling, thus cementing her face turn.

At NXT Deadline, Paxley was defeated by Dame due to distraction from her former stablemates. Paxley would then get her revenge on Dame by defeating her at NXT: New Year's Evil and by dethroning her to become the new NXT Women's North American Champion at NXT Vengeance Day. With the win, she became the second woman after Stephanie Vaquer to win both NXT Women's Championship and NXT Women's North American Championship. On the March 17 episode of NXT, Paxley retained the title against Dame inside a steel cage match to end their feud. After the match, Paxley was attacked by Blake Monroe with Monroe stealing her title. At NXT Stand & Deliver, Paxley retained the title against Monroe. In a rematch for the title at Week 2 of NXT: Revenge on April 21, Paxley defeated Monroe in a casket match. The match was notable to be the first casket match for a championship since the 1998 Royal Rumble between The Undertaker and WWF Champion Shawn Michaels. On the June 9 episode of NXT, she lost the NXT Women's North American Championship to Zaria, ending her reign at 94 days. At NXT The Great American Bash on June 28, Paxley failed to regain the title from Zaria. On the June 30 episode of NXT, Paxley lost to Kelani Jordan in what would be her final match in NXT.

==== SmackDown (2026–present) ====
On the August 7, 2026 episode of SmackDown, Paxley made her main roster debut, attacking B-Fab and Michin to assist Charlotte Flair in defeating Jade Cargill and aligned herself with Flair and Alexa Bliss. On the August 29 episode of SmackDown, Paxley won her main roster debut match by defeating Michin. Paxley teamed with Flair and Bliss in a six-woman tag team match against Cargill, Michin and B-Fab at Sunday Night’s Main Event on September 6, where the former team lost. On the October 9 episode of SmackDown, Paxley and Bliss, who replaced Flair in the last minute after a backstage attack from Cargill, defeated Fatal Influence (Fallon Henley and Lainey Reid) to win the WWE Women's Tag Team Championship. On the October 23 episode of SmackDown, Paxley and Bliss lost the titles to Michin and B-Fab after interference from Cargill, ending their reign at 14 days.

=== Total Nonstop Action Wrestling (2024–2025) ===
At NXT Battleground on June 9, 2024, halfway through the NXT Women's Championship match between Perez and Jordynne Grace (the then TNA Knockouts World Champion), Paxley appeared from the crowd and attempted to steal the TNA Knockouts World Championship but was stopped by Ash by Elegance and Grace, who lost the title match as a result of the interference. After failing to steal the TNA Knockouts World Championship at NXT Battleground, Paxley made her surprise debut appearance in TNA at Against All Odds on June 14, where she answered Grace's open challenge for the title but failed to win the title. On the March 15, 2025, taping of Impact!, Paxley returned to TNA with Dolin and demanded a title match against Ash by Elegance and Heather by Elegance (the then TNA Knockouts World Tag Team Champions) but failed to win the titles the following week. On the April 17 episode of Impact!, Paxley and Dolin won their first TNA match by defeating Heather by Elegance and Maggie Lee.

== Other media ==
Holland, as Tatum Paxley, made her video game debut as a playable character in WWE 2K25 and has since appeared in WWE 2K26. Holland alongside her husband also appeared in a music video for the song Solace In Silence by Florida based metalcore band Not Enough Space.

== Personal life ==
On September 17, 2023, Holland was engaged to fellow professional wrestler Randy José Beidelschies, better known as Javier Bernal in NXT. They got married on September 28, 2024.

== Championships and accomplishments ==
- Pro Wrestling Illustrated
  - Ranked No. 141 of the top 250 female wrestlers in the PWI Women's 250 in 2024
- WWE
  - NXT Women's Championship (1 time)
  - NXT Women's North American Championship (1 time)
  - WWE Women's Tag Team Championship (1 time) – with Alexa Bliss
  - NXT Year-End Award (1 time)
    - Moment of the Year (2025) – Winning the NXT Women's Championship at NXT Halloween Havoc
