= NXT Women's Championship =

WWE professional wrestling championship

NXT Women’s Championship
- The current NXT Women's Championship belt with default side plates (2024–present)

Details
- Promotion: WWE
- Brand: NXT
- Date established: April 5, 2013
- Current champion: Kelani Jordan
- Date won: August 30, 2026
Statistics
- First champion: Paige
- Most reigns: 2 reigns: Shayna Baszler; Charlotte Flair (Note: She was known as just Charlotte during her first reign.); Roxanne Perez; Jacy Jayne
- Longest reign: Asuka (510 days) (Note: WWE officially recognizes Asuka's reign as 522 days due to tape delay.)
- Shortest reign: Tatum Paxley (24 days)
- Oldest champion: Shayna Baszler (38 years, 81 days)
- Youngest champion: Paige (20 years, 307 days)
- Heaviest champion: Raquel González (176 lbs (80 kg))
- Lightest champion: Stephanie Vaquer (110 lbs (50 kg))

The NXT Women's Championship is a women's professional wrestling championship created and promoted by the American promotion WWE. It is defended on NXT, the promotion's developmental brand. The current champion is Kelani Jordan, who is in her first reign. She won the title by defeating Kendal Grey at Heatwave on August 30, 2026.

Introduced on April 5, 2013, the inaugural champion was Paige. In September 2019, the promotion began promoting NXT as its "third main brand" when the NXT television program was moved to the USA Network. Two years later, however, NXT reverted to its original function as WWE's developmental brand. To date, it has been the only NXT championship to be selected by a Royal Rumble match winner, which occurred in 2020, subsequently being the only NXT championship to be defended at a WrestleMania, which occurred at that year's WrestleMania 36. In September 2022, the NXT UK Women's Championship was unified into the NXT Women's Championship.

== History ==
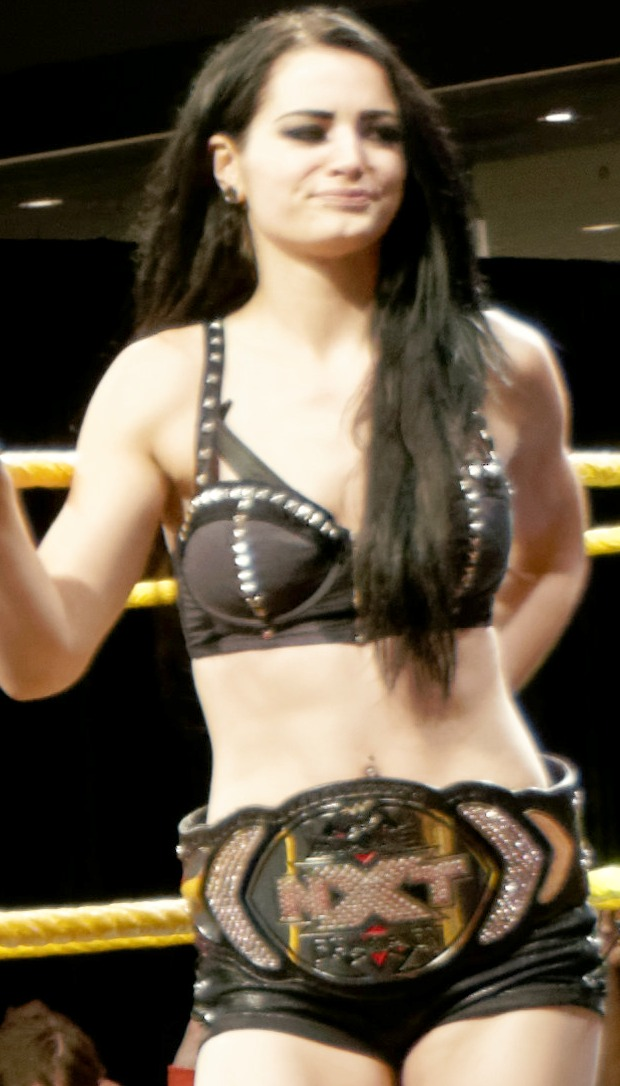
The inaugural NXT Women's Champion Paige, shown here with the original championship belt design (2013–2017)

In June 2012, WWE established NXT as their developmental territory, replacing Florida Championship Wrestling (FCW). The following year on April 5, the NXT Women's Championship was introduced during WrestleMania Axxess. On the May 30 tapings of NXT (aired June 5), WWE's Chief Brand Officer Stephanie McMahon announced that there would be an eight-woman single-elimination tournament, featuring four women from NXT and four from WWE's main roster competing to be crowned the first NXT Women's Champion. During the June 20 tapings of NXT (aired July 24), Paige defeated Emma in the tournament final to become the inaugural champion.

Paige successfully defended her title at Arrival against Emma. Then-NXT General Manager, John "Bradshaw" Layfield, stripped Paige of the title on the April 24, 2014, episode of NXT, as Paige had recently won the WWE Divas Championship, and was in turn promoted to WWE's main roster. A new tournament began the following week. The finals occurred at TakeOver where Charlotte defeated Natalya to win the vacant NXT Women's Championship. On the September 16, 2015, episode of NXT, now NXT General Manager William Regal announced that Bayley would defend her title against Sasha Banks in the main event at TakeOver: Respect on October 7 in the first-ever 30-minute Iron Woman match in WWE history. At the event, Bayley defeated Banks to retain the championship, scoring the win with 3 falls to 2.

Although NXT had been established as WWE's developmental territory, WWE began promoting it as their "third brand" in September 2019 when NXT was moved to the USA Network. This subsequently made the NXT Women's Championship one of the top three singles titles for women in WWE, along with the Raw Women's Championship—which had replaced the Divas title in 2016—and the SmackDown Women's Championship (these two titles would be renamed as WWE Women's Championship and Women's World Championship, respectively, in June 2023). This was validated in 2020; first, Charlotte Flair (previously known as just Charlotte) won the 2020 Women's Royal Rumble and chose to challenge for the NXT Women's Championship at WrestleMania 36, becoming the first Royal Rumble winner to challenge for an NXT title, and secondly, the title became the first NXT championship to be defended at a WrestleMania where during WrestleMania 36 Part 2, Flair defeated defending champion Rhea Ripley to win her record-tying second NXT Women's Championship. However, WWE revamped NXT in September 2021 and returned the brand to its original function as a developmental territory.

In January 2020, WWE briefly began referring to the women's championship as the "NXT Championship" to bring it on an equal level as the men's title, though reverted to calling it the NXT Women's Championship soon after; it remained as NXT Women's Championship on the official title history during this time.

In August 2022, WWE announced that the NXT UK brand would go on hiatus and would relaunch as NXT Europe at a later time. As such, NXT UK's championship's were unified into their respective NXT championship counterparts. On September 4, 2022, at Worlds Collide, reigning NXT Women's Champion Mandy Rose defeated NXT UK Women's Champion Meiko Satomura and Blair Davenport in a triple threat match to unify the NXT UK Women's Championship into the NXT Women's Championship. Satomura was recognized as the final NXT UK Women's Champion, while Rose went forward as the unified NXT Women's Champion.

Whenever the title is held by a main roster wrestler, it occasionally gets defended on main roster shows, such as when Raw wrestler Becky Lynch defended it on Raw on September 18, October 9, and October 23, 2023.

== Tournaments ==
=== Inaugural NXT Women's Championship tournament (2013) ===
Tournament bracket

First Round; NXT; May 23, 2013 (Aired: June 5–26)
Tamina Snuka	4:00
Paige	Pinfall
Bayley	3:27
Alicia Fox	Pinfall
Sasha Banks	3:30
Summer Rae	Pinfall
Emma	Submission
Aksana	3:40

Semifinals; NXT; June 20, 2013 (Aired: July 3–10)
Paige	Pinfall
Alicia Fox	4:44
Summer Rae	4:25
Emma	Pinfall

Final; NXT; June 20, 2013 (Aired: July 24)
Paige	Pinfall
Emma	13:12

=== Second NXT Women's Championship tournament (2014) ===
Tournament bracket

Quarterfinals; NXT; April 24, 2014 (Aired: May 1–8)
Bayley	3:58
Sasha Banks	Submission
Layla	3:30
Natalya	Submission
Alexa Bliss	Pinfall
Alicia Fox	3:08
Charlotte	Pinfall
Emma	3:50

Semifinals; NXT; April 24, 2014 (Aired: May 15)
Sasha Banks	4:06
Natalya	Submission
Alexa Bliss	5:01
Charlotte	Pinfall

Final; TakeOver; May 29, 2014
Natalya	16:49
Charlotte	Pinfall

=== Third NXT Women's Championship tournament (2023) ===
Tournament bracket

First Round; NXT; May 9–16, 2023
Gigi Dolin	4:29
Tiffany Stratton	Pinfall
Jacy Jayne	9:06
Roxanne Perez	Pinfall
Lyra Valkyria	Pinfall
Kiana James	8:51
Fallon Henley	5:05
Cora Jade	Pinfall

Semifinals; NXT; May 23, 2023
Tiffany Stratton	Pinfall
Roxanne Perez	9:39
Lyra Valkyria	Pinfall
Cora Jade	3:41

Final; NXT Battleground; May 28, 2023
Tiffany Stratton	Pinfall
Lyra Valkyria	16:01

== Belt designs ==
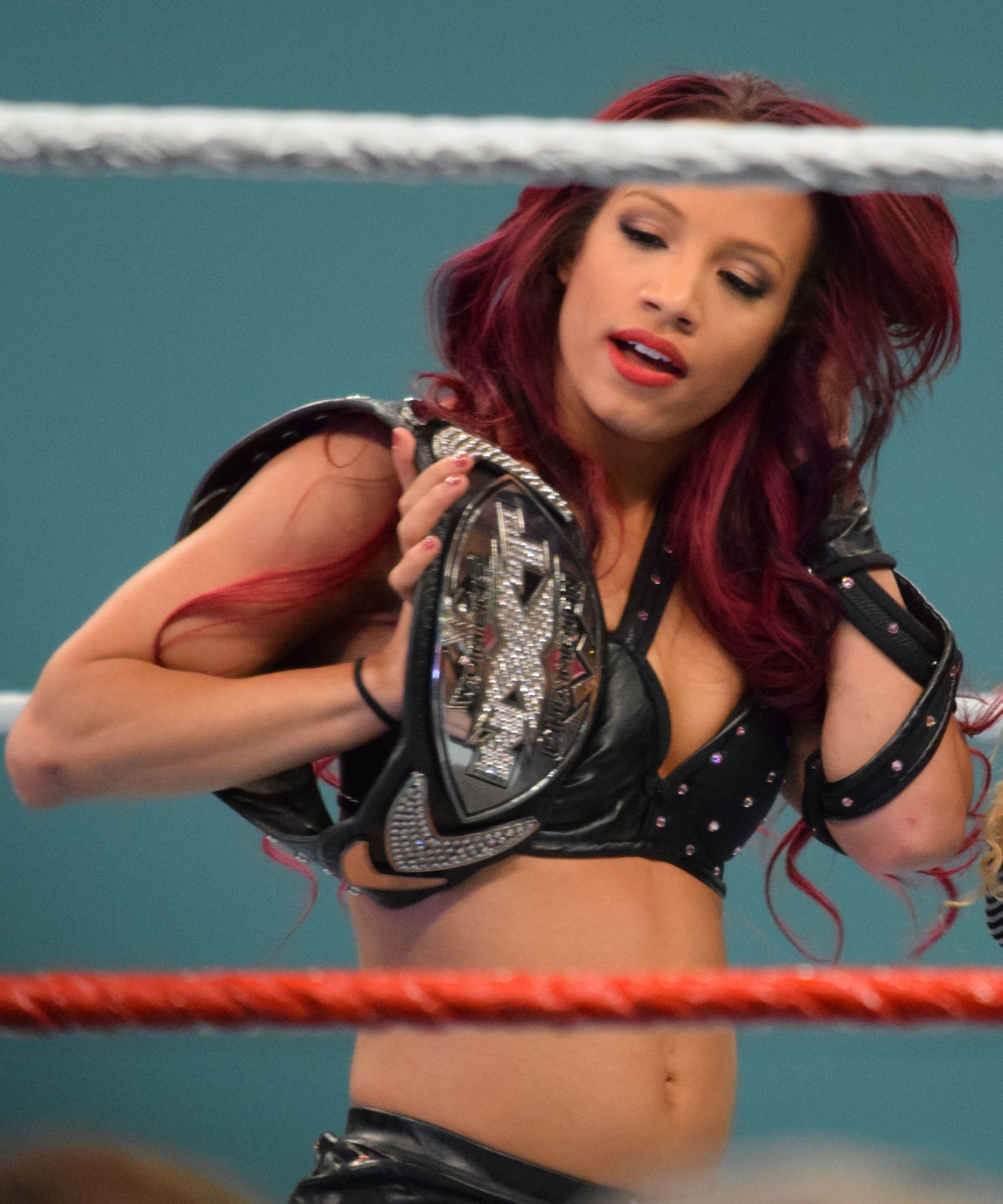
Sasha Banks with the original design of the NXT Women's Championship belt (2013–2017).

The original NXT Women's Championship belt featured an oval-shaped silver center plate. At the top of the plate was the WWE logo. The center of the plate was the NXT logo encrusted with pink diamonds; red coloring was behind the letter "X". Above the NXT logo read "Women's" while below the logo read "Champion". There were two side plates, which were skinny and matched the curve of the center plate. The inner side plates were encrusted with pink diamonds, while the outer side plates were blank silver plates. The plates were on a black leather strap. When first introduced, the WWE logo was the long-standing scratch logo but in August 2014, all of WWE's pre-existing championships at the time received a minor update, changing the scratch logo to WWE's current logo that was originally used for the WWE Network that launched earlier that year in February.

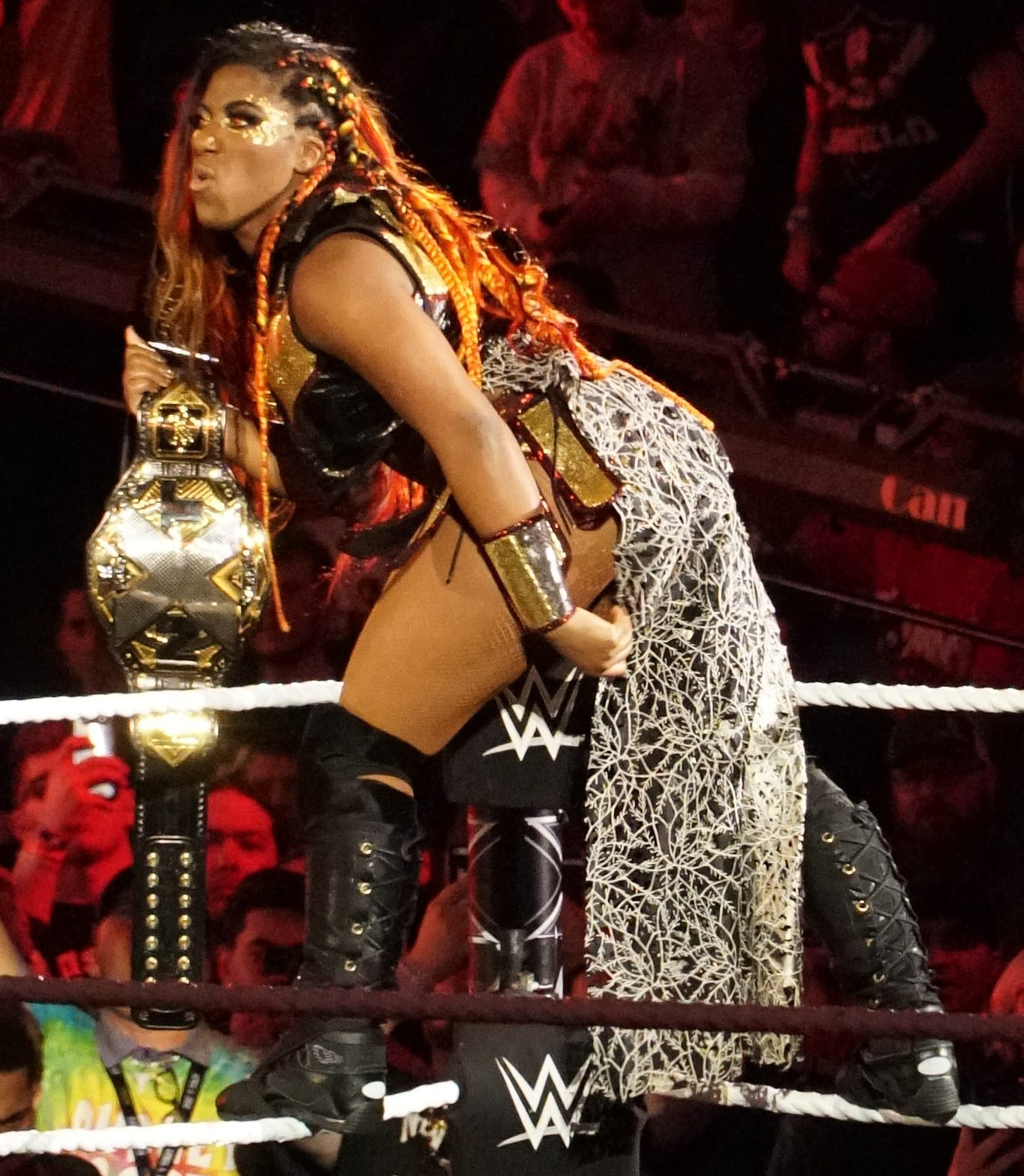
Ember Moon with the second design of the NXT Women's Championship belt (2017–2022).

On April 1, 2017, at WrestleMania Axxess, NXT General Manager William Regal announced that all of the existing NXT title belts at the time would be redesigned. The new title belts were unveiled at TakeOver: Orlando that same night and given to the winners of their respective matches. The redesigned women's championship featured a nearly identical design to the redesigned NXT Championship, including being on a black leather strap, but with a couple of notable differences. The belt was smaller to fit the women. The letters "NXT" on the center plate were silver instead of gold, while the rest of the plate was gold. One other difference was that a banner reading "Women's" was underneath the WWE logo. Coming in line with WWE's other championship belts, the new design featured side plates with a removable center section that could be customized with the champion's logo; the default plates featured the WWE logo.

The NXT 2.0 version of the championship belt (2022–2024)

On April 2, 2022, during NXT's WrestleMania week event, Stand & Deliver, reigning champion Mandy Rose debuted a new belt design; it was largely similar to the previous version (2017–2022), but the silver behind the logo was replaced by multi-colored paint (matching the NXT 2.0 colorscheme) and the letters "N" and "T" on the center plate were updated to the font style of the NXT 2.0 logo. The default side plates were also updated, replacing the WWE logo with the NXT 2.0 logo. Coming in line with all other women's championships in WWE, the plates were on a white leather strap instead of black. When "NXT 2.0" went back to being called "NXT" in September, the default side plates were updated with the new NXT logo.

With NXT's move to The CW on October 1, 2024, the show got a new logo. As a result, both the men's and women's NXT championship belts received an update that same episode. They mostly have the same design as their respective previous version, but with The CW era NXT logo on the center plate and side plates, with more of a globe visible behind the logo on the center plate. The multi-colored paint from the NXT 2.0 version (2022–2024) was also removed, and the plates are now primarily silver with gold accents.

== Reigns ==
As of October 15, 2026, there have been 28 reigns between 24 champions, and three vacancies. Paige was the inaugural champion. Asuka is the longest reigning champion at 510 days, beginning on April 1, 2016, and ending on August 24, 2017; however, WWE recognizes the reign as 522 days, with it ending on September 6, 2017, the date the episode in which she vacated the title aired on tape delay. Tatum Paxley has the shortest reign at 24 days. Paige is the youngest champion, winning it at the age of 20, while Shayna Baszler is the oldest, winning the championship at 38. Baszler, Charlotte Flair, Roxanne Perez, and Jacy Jayne are tied for the most reigns at two. Only three women have held the title for a continuous reign of one year (365 days) or more: Asuka, Shayna Baszler, and Mandy Rose.

Kelani Jordan is the current champion in her first reign. She won the title by defeating Kendal Grey at Heatwave on August 30, 2026, in Edinburg, Texas.

== See also ==
- Women's championships in WWE
- Women in WWE
- List of current champions in WWE
