= List of NXT Champions =

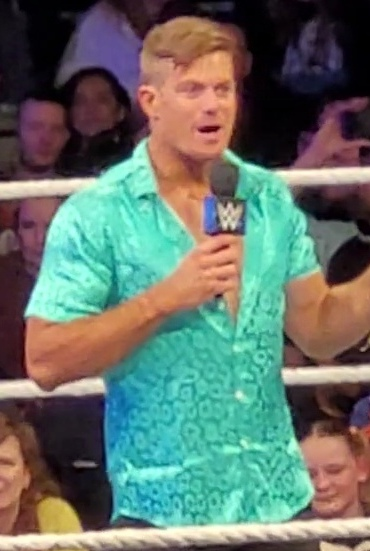
Current champion Grayson Waller

The NXT Championship is a professional wrestling championship created and promoted by the American professional wrestling promotion WWE, defended as the top championship of their NXT brand division. The championship was first introduced on the July 1, 2012, episode of NXT when NXT Commissioner Dusty Rhodes announced a Gold Rush tournament, involving four developmental roster wrestlers and four main roster wrestlers competing to be crowned as the inaugural NXT Champion in a single elimination tournament. Seth Rollins became the inaugural NXT Champion by defeating Jinder Mahal in the tournament finals on July 26, 2012 (aired August 29).

As of June 29, 2026, there have been 38 reigns among 29 different champions and four vacancies. Samoa Joe has the most reigns at three. Finn Bálor has the longest combined reign at 504 days. Adam Cole's reign is the longest singular reign at 396 days (403 days as recognized by WWE due to tape delay), while Karrion Kross' first reign is the shortest at 4 days (3 days as recognized by WWE) as he had to relinquish the title due to a legitimate injury he suffered in winning it. Bo Dallas holds the record as the youngest champion, winning the title two days before his 23rd birthday (although WWE recognizes it was 18 days after his 23rd birthday due to tape delay), while Samoa Joe is the oldest champion, winning the title at 42.

Grayson Waller is the current champion in his first reign. He won the title by defeating previous champion Tony D'Angelo, Cruz Montana, and Zilla Fatu in a fatal four-way match at Heatwave on August 30, 2026, in Edinburg, Texas.

== Title history ==
Key
No.	Overall reign number
Reign	Reign number for the specific champion
Days	Number of days held
Days recog.	Number of days held recognized by the promotion
+	Current reign is changing daily

No.	Champion	Championship change			Reign statistics			Notes	Ref.
No.	Champion	Date	Event	Location	Reign	Days	Days recog.	Notes	Ref.
WWE: NXT
1	Seth Rollins	July 26, 2012	NXT	Winter Park, FL	1	133	133	Title was established on July 1, 2012, for WWE's developmental brand NXT. Rollins defeated Jinder Mahal in the eight-man NXT Championship tournament finals to become the inaugural champion. WWE recognizes his reign as beginning on August 29, 2012, when the match aired on tape delay.	
2	Big E Langston	December 6, 2012	NXT	Winter Park, FL	1	168	153	This was a no disqualification match. WWE recognizes Big E's reign as beginning on January 9, 2013, when the match aired on tape delay.	
3	Bo Dallas	May 23, 2013	NXT	Winter Park, FL	1	280	260	WWE recognizes Dallas' reign as beginning on June 12, 2013, when the match aired on tape delay.	
4	Adrian Neville	February 27, 2014	Arrival	Winter Park, FL	1	287	286	This was a ladder match.	
5	Sami Zayn	December 11, 2014	TakeOver: R Evolution	Winter Park, FL	1	62	62	This was a title vs. career match where if Zayn had lost, he would have voluntarily quit NXT.	
6	Kevin Owens	February 11, 2015	TakeOver: Rival	Winter Park, FL	1	143	142	Owens won when the referee decided that Sami Zayn was unable to continue.	
7	Finn Bálor	July 4, 2015	The Beast in the East	Tokyo, Japan	1	292	292		
8	Samoa Joe	April 21, 2016	NXT Live	Lowell, MA	1	121	121		
9	Shinsuke Nakamura	August 20, 2016	TakeOver: Brooklyn II	Brooklyn, NY	1	91	91		
10	Samoa Joe	November 19, 2016	TakeOver: Toronto	Toronto, ON, Canada	2	14	13		
11	Shinsuke Nakamura	December 3, 2016	NXT	Osaka, Japan	2	56	56		
12	Bobby Roode	January 28, 2017	TakeOver: San Antonio	San Antonio, TX	1	203	202		
13	Drew McIntyre	August 19, 2017	TakeOver: Brooklyn III	Brooklyn, NY	1	91	91		
14	Andrade "Cien" Almas	November 18, 2017	TakeOver: WarGames	Houston, TX	1	140	139		
15	Aleister Black	April 7, 2018	TakeOver: New Orleans	New Orleans, LA	1	102	108		
16	Tommaso Ciampa	July 18, 2018	NXT	Winter Park, FL	1	238	237	WWE recognizes Ciampa's reign as beginning on July 25, 2018 and ending on March 20, 2019 due to both episodes airing on tape delay.	
—	Vacated	March 13, 2019	NXT	Winter Park, FL	—	—	—	The title was vacated due to Tommaso Ciampa requiring neck surgery. Aired on tape delay on March 20, 2019.	
17	Johnny Gargano	April 5, 2019	TakeOver: New York	Brooklyn, NY	1	57	56	Defeated Adam Cole in a two out of three falls match to win the vacant title.	
18	Adam Cole	June 1, 2019	TakeOver: XXV	Bridgeport, CT	1	396	403	WWE recognizes Cole's reign as ending on July 8, 2020, when the following match aired on tape delay.	
19	Keith Lee	July 1, 2020	NXT: The Great American Bash; Night 2	Winter Park, FL	1	52	44	This was a Winner Takes All match, in which Lee also defended the NXT North American Championship. WWE recognizes Lee's reign as beginning on July 8, 2020, when the match aired on tape delay.	
20	Karrion Kross	August 22, 2020	TakeOver XXX	Winter Park, FL	1	4	3		
—	Vacated	August 26, 2020	NXT	Winter Park, FL	—	—	—	Karrion Kross relinquished the title due to suffering a separated shoulder during his match at TakeOver XXX.	
21	Finn Bálor	September 8, 2020	NXT: Super Tuesday II	Winter Park, FL	2	212	212	A 60-minute fatal four-way iron man match for the vacant championship took place on the September 1 episode of NXT Super Tuesday between Finn Bálor, Adam Cole, Tommaso Ciampa, and Johnny Gargano, but the match ended in a tie between Bálor and Cole. NXT General Manager William Regal then scheduled a match between the two for the following week, in which Bálor defeated Cole to win the vacant title.	
22	Karrion Kross	April 8, 2021	TakeOver: Stand & Deliver; Night 2	Orlando, FL	2	136	136		
23	Samoa Joe	August 22, 2021	TakeOver 36	Orlando, FL	3	21	20		
—	Vacated	September 12, 2021	–	–	—	—	—	Samoa Joe relinquished the title due to what WWE reported as an unspecified injury; Joe later clarified that the vacancy happened due to him testing positive for COVID-19 as well as the overall directional change of NXT, which saw NXT rebranded as NXT 2.0.	
24	Tommaso Ciampa	September 14, 2021	NXT 2.0	Orlando, FL	2	112	111	This was a fatal four-way match for the vacant championship, also involving LA Knight, Pete Dunne, and Von Wagner.	
25	Bron Breakker	January 4, 2022	NXT 2.0: New Year's Evil	Orlando, FL	1	63	63		
26	Dolph Ziggler	March 8, 2022	NXT 2.0: Roadblock	Orlando, FL	1	27	26	This was a triple threat match, also involving Tommaso Ciampa, who Ziggler pinned.	
27	Bron Breakker	April 4, 2022	Raw	Dallas, TX	2	362	361	On September 4, 2022 at Worlds Collide, Breakker defeated Tyler Bate to unify the NXT United Kingdom Championship into the NXT Championship. The NXT United Kingdom Championship was retired with Breakker going forward as the unified NXT Champion.	
28	Carmelo Hayes	April 1, 2023	Stand & Deliver	Los Angeles, CA	1	182	182		
29	Ilja Dragunov	September 30, 2023	No Mercy	Bakersfield, CA	1	206	205		
30	Trick Williams	April 23, 2024	NXT: Spring Breakin'; Night 1	Orlando, FL	1	75	74	Had Williams lost, he would have had to leave NXT.	
31	Ethan Page	July 7, 2024	Heatwave	Toronto, ON, Canada	1	86	86	This was a fatal four-way match also involving Shawn Spears and Je'Von Evans, who Page pinned.	
32	Trick Williams	October 1, 2024	NXT's debut on The CW	Rosemont, IL	2	98	98	CM Punk was the special guest referee.	
33	Oba Femi	January 7, 2025	NXT: New Year's Evil	Los Angeles, CA	1	263	262	This was a triple threat match also involving Eddy Thorpe.	
34	Ricky Saints	September 27, 2025	No Mercy	Fort Lauderdale, FL	1	70	69		
35	Oba Femi	December 6, 2025	Deadline	San Antonio, TX	2	31	31		
—	Vacated	January 6, 2026	NXT: New Year's Evil	Orlando, FL	—	—	—	After successfully defending the title against Leon Slater, Oba Femi left the NXT Championship belt in the ring, voluntarily relinquishing the title as he moved up to the main roster.	
36	Joe Hendry	February 3, 2026	NXT	Orlando, FL	1	60	59	Defeated Ricky Saints, Dion Lennox, Sean Legacy, Jackson Drake, Shiloh Hill, and Keanu Carver in a seven-man ladder match to win the vacant title.	
37	Tony D'Angelo	April 4, 2026	Stand & Deliver	Chesterfield, MO	1	148	147	This was a fatal four-way match also involving Ethan Page and Ricky Saints.	
38	Grayson Waller	August 30, 2026	Heatwave	Edinburg, TX	1	70+	70+	This was a fatal four-way match also involving Cruz Montana and Zilla Fatu.	

== Combined reigns ==
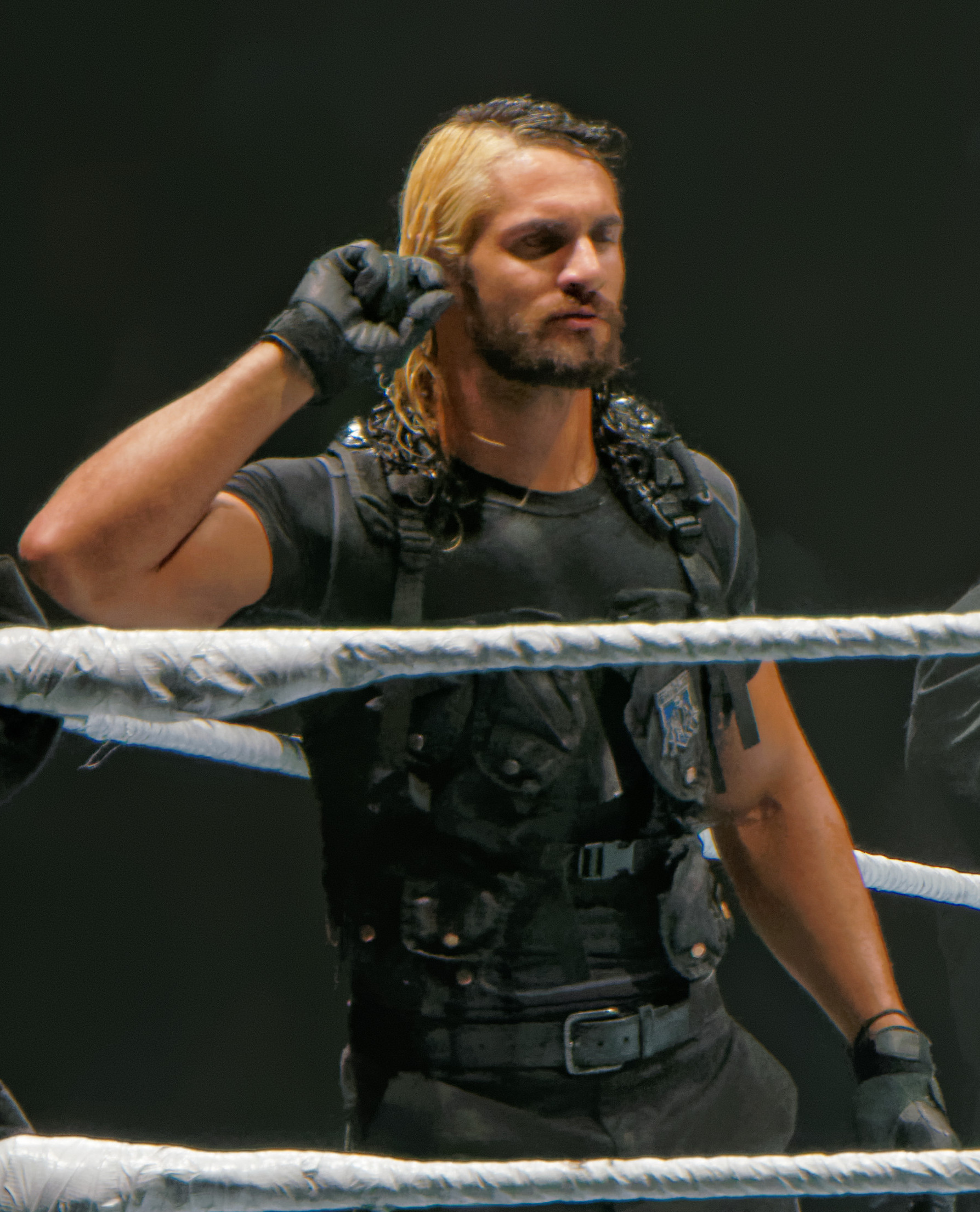
Inaugural champion Seth Rollins

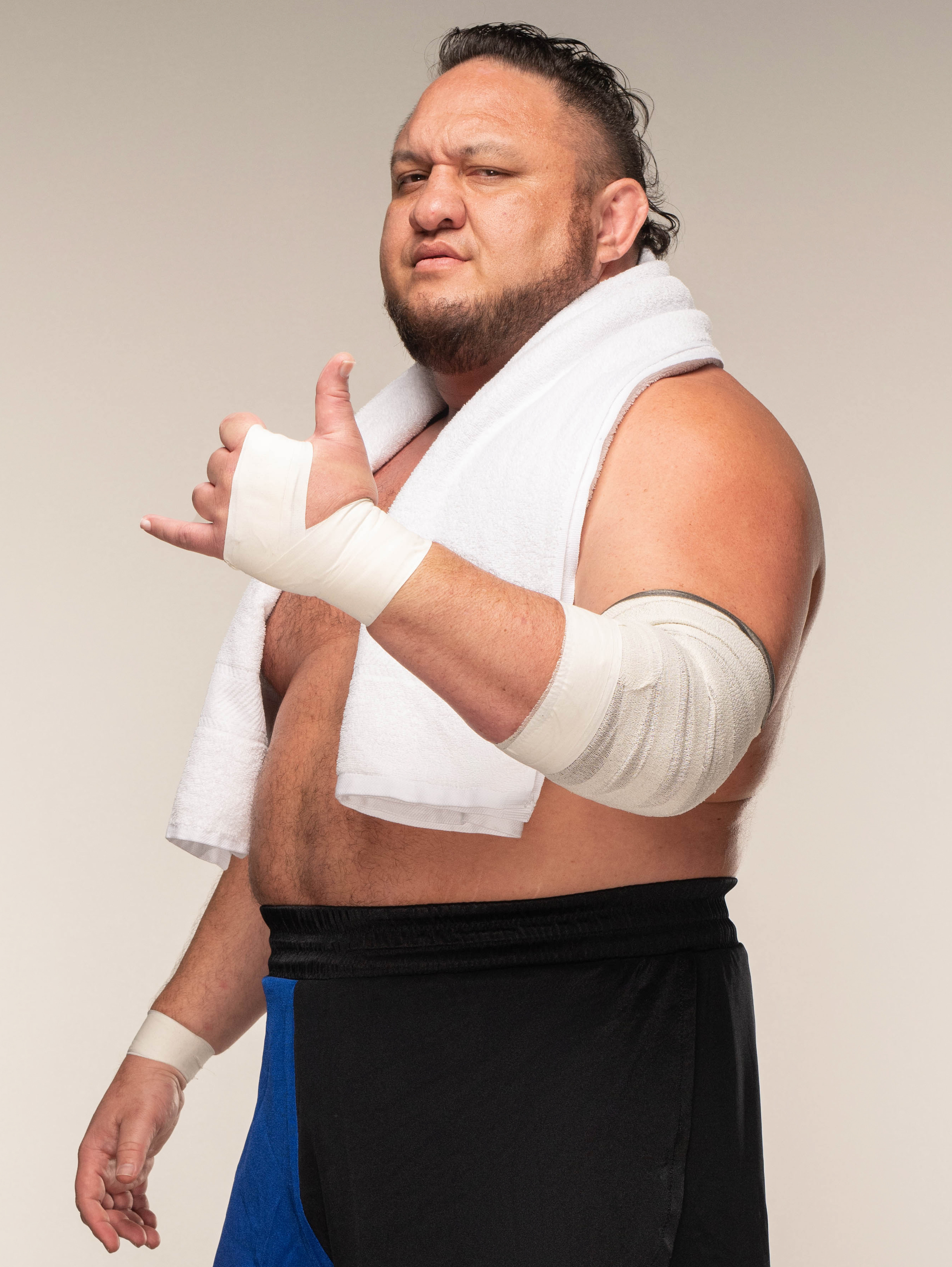
Record three-time champion Samoa Joe

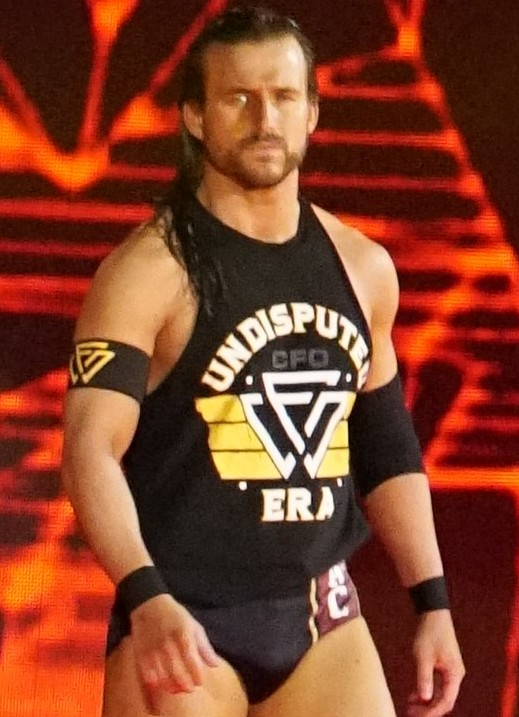
Longest-reigning champion Adam Cole

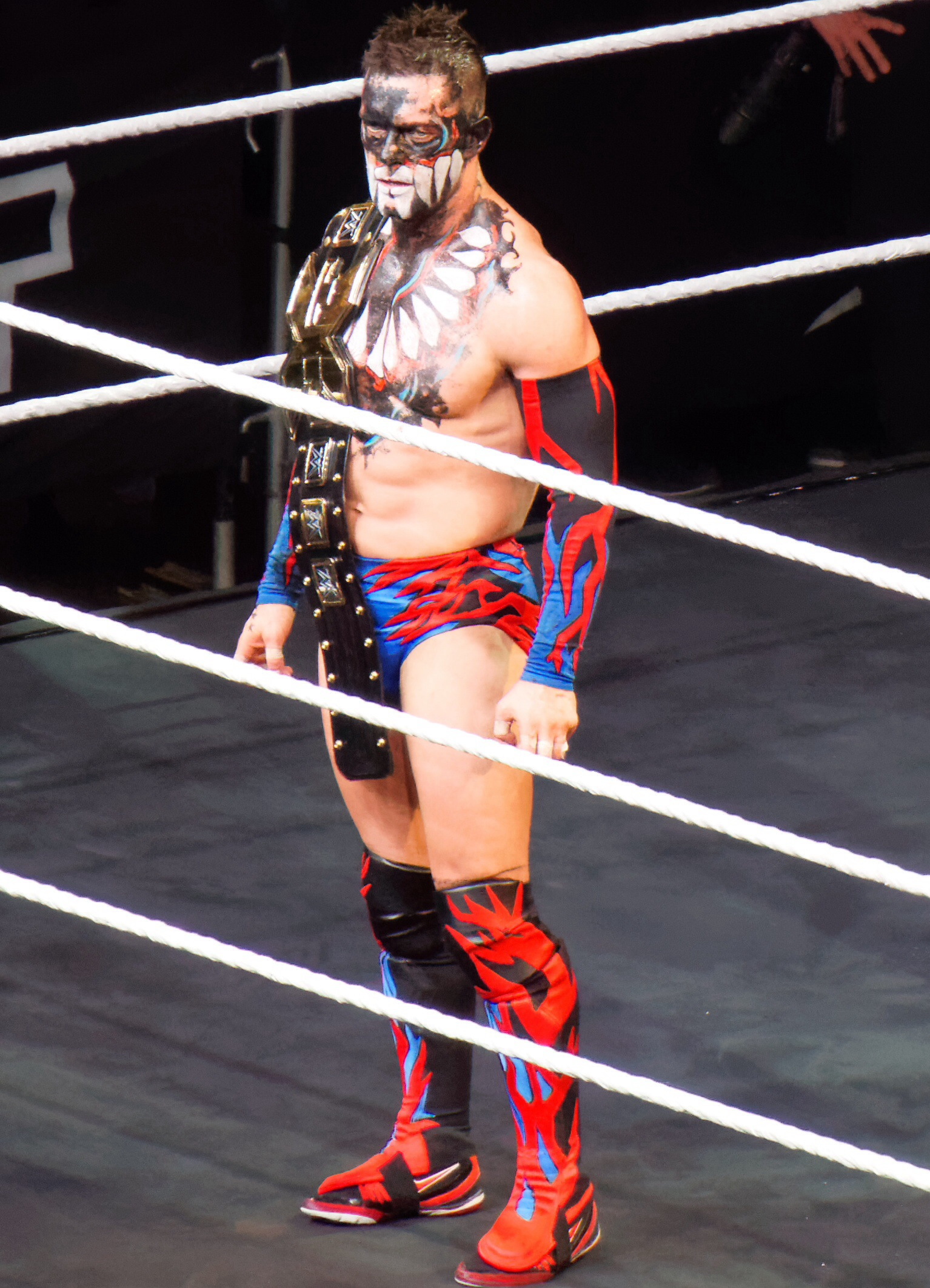
Two-time and longest combined-reigning champion Finn Bálor

As of September 26, 2026.

†	Indicates the current champion

Rank	Wrestler	No. of reigns	Combined days	Combined days rec. by WWE
1	Finn Bálor	2	504	
2	Bron Breakker	2	425	424
3	Adam Cole	1	396	403
4	Tommaso Ciampa	2	350	348
5	Oba Femi	2	294	293
6	Adrian Neville	1	287	286
7	Bo Dallas	1	280	260
8	Ilja Dragunov	1	206	205
9	Bobby Roode	1	203	202
10	Carmelo Hayes	1	182	
11	Trick Williams	2	173	172
12	Big E Langston	1	168	153
13	Samoa Joe	3	156	154
14	Tony D'Angelo	1	148	
15	Shinsuke Nakamura	2	147	
16	Kevin Owens	1	143	142
17	Andrade "Cien" Almas	1	140	
17	Karrion Kross	2	140	139
19	Seth Rollins	1	133	
20	Aleister Black	1	102	108
21	Drew McIntyre	1	91	
22	Ethan Page	1	86	
23	Grayson Waller †	1	70+	
24	Ricky Saints	1	70	
25	Sami Zayn	1	62	
26	Joe Hendry	1	60	
27	Johnny Gargano	1	57	56
28	Keith Lee	1	52	44
29	Dolph Ziggler	1	27	26
