= WWE Heatwave =

Professional wrestling event series by ECW/WWE

Heatwave
- NXT Heatwave logo used since 2022. Starting from 2025, the WWE logo is used.
- Promotions: Extreme Championship Wrestling (1994–2000); WWE (2022–present); Lucha Libre AAA Worldwide (2026–present)
- Brand: NXT (2022–present)
- Other name(s): Heatwave: the Battle for the Future; Heatwave: Rage in the Cage! Ola de Calor
- First event: Heatwave '94: the Battle for the Future

Heatwave, originally stylized as Heat Wave and also referred to as Ola de Calor, is a professional wrestling event currently produced by the American promotion WWE for its developmental brand NXT and its Mexican-subsidiary Lucha Libre AAA Worldwide (AAA). It was originally produced by Extreme Championship Wrestling (ECW) and took place annually from 1994 to 2000. ECW folded in 2001 and WWE acquired its assets in 2003 and reinstated Heat Wave, but stylized as Heatwave, as its own event in 2022. The event's name is a reference to it being held during the summer, either in July or August.

Since its revival by WWE in 2022, Heatwave has been held annually for NXT, first as a television special of NXT in 2022 and 2023, then as a premium live event (PLE) beginning in 2024. After WWE acquired AAA in 2025, a localized version of Heatwave for the Mexican market took place in 2026, promoted as Ola de Calor (Spanish for "Heatwave"), the same day as NXT's 2026 event, taking place right before it.

== Events ==
NXT-branded event

Event	Date	City	Venue	Main event	Ref.
Eastern Championship Wrestling
Heatwave '94: the Battle for the Future	July 16, 1994	Philadelphia, Pennsylvania	ECW Arena	The Public Enemy (Rocco Rock and Johnny Grunge) vs. Terry Funk and Dory Funk, Jr. in a barbed wire match	
Extreme Championship Wrestling
Heatwave '95: Rage in the Cage!	July 15, 1995	Philadelphia, Pennsylvania	ECW Arena	The Public Enemy (Rocco Rock and Johnny Grunge) vs. The Gangstas (New Jack and Mustafa Saed) in a steel cage match	
Heat Wave (1996)	July 13, 1996	Philadelphia, Pennsylvania	ECW Arena	The Sandman, Terry Gordy and Tommy Dreamer vs. Raven (c), Brian Lee and Stevie Richards in a steel cage match	
Heat Wave (1997)	July 19, 1997	Philadelphia, Pennsylvania	ECW Arena	Rob Van Dam, Sabu and Jerry Lawler vs. Tommy Dreamer, The Sandman and Rick Rude in a steel cage match	
Heat Wave (1998)	August 2, 1998	Dayton, Ohio	Hara Arena	Tommy Dreamer, The Sandman and Spike Dudley vs. The Dudleys (Buh Buh Ray Dudley, D-Von Dudley and Big Dick Dudley) in a Street Fight	
Heat Wave (1999)	July 18, 1999	Dayton, Ohio	Hara Arena	Rob Van Dam and Jerry Lynn vs. Impact Players (Lance Storm and Justin Credible)	
Heat Wave (2000)	July 16, 2000	Los Angeles, California	Grand Olympic Auditorium	Justin Credible (c) vs. Tommy Dreamer in a Stairway to Hell match for the ECW World Heavyweight Championship	
WWE / AAA
Heatwave (2022)	August 16, 2022	Orlando, Florida	WWE Performance Center	Bron Breakker (c) vs. JD McDonagh for the NXT Championship	
Heatwave (2023)	August 22, 2023	Orlando, Florida	WWE Performance Center	Carmelo Hayes (c) vs. Wes Lee for the NXT Championship	
Heatwave (2024)	July 7, 2024	Toronto, Ontario, Canada	Scotiabank Arena	Trick Williams (c) vs. Je'Von Evans vs. Ethan Page vs. Shawn Spears for the NXT Championship	
Heatwave (2025)	August 24, 2025	Lowell, Massachusetts	Lowell Memorial Auditorium	Oba Femi (c) vs. Je'Von Evans for the NXT Championship	
Ola de Calor	August 30, 2026	Edinburg, Texas	Bert Ogden Arena	Dragon Lee and The Lucha Brothers (Penta and Rey Fénix) vs. Los Perros del Mal (Daga, Angel, and Berto)	
Heatwave (2026)	August 30, 2026	Edinburg, Texas	Bert Ogden Arena	Tony D'Angelo (c) vs. Grayson Waller vs. Cruz Montana vs. Zilla Fatu in a Fatal four-way match for the NXT Championship	
(c) – refers to the champion(s) heading into the match
