= Riley Osborne =

British professional wrestler

Personal information
- Born: Josh Terry; 27 March 1998 (age 28) Cumbria, England, UK
- Spouse: Bea Priestley (m. 2024)

Professional wrestling career
- Ring name(s): Riley Osborne; Josh Morrell; Josh Terry
- Billed weight: 225 lb (102 kg)
- Trained by: Johnny Moss
- Debut: 2014

Josh Terry (born 27 March 1998) is an English professional wrestler. He is best known for his time in WWE, where he performed under the ring name Riley Osborne.

== Professional wrestling career ==
=== Early career (2014–2018) ===
Terry began training as early as 2014 when fellow countryman Johnny Moss first opened his professional wrestling school in England. At just 16 years of age, Terry made his debut as the first of 15 entrants in a Rumble Match.

=== WWE (2018–2025) ===
==== Early appearances and NXT UK (2018–2023) ====
Terry made his first WWE appearance on the 7 November 2018 episode of 205 Live under the ring name Josh Morrell, where he lost against Lio Rush. Terry made another appearance on the 2 January 2019 episode of NXT UK as Josh Morrell, where he lost a match to Wild Boar. On 2 September 2023, under the name Riley Osborne, he made his official debut with WWE on NXT Level Up in a loss against Javier Bernal. On 30 November, Osborne made his main roster debut on Main Event in a losing effort to Apollo Crews.

==== NXT (2023–2025) ====
In December 2023, Osborne was announced as a participant in the NXT Men's Breakout Tournament and was introduced as a student of Chase University. Osborne defeated Keanu Carver in the first round and Lexis King in the semi-finals but lost to Oba Femi in the finals at NXT: New Year's Evil on 2 January 2024. Later in January, in an attempt to save Chase U from debt, Osborne and fellow Chase U member Duke Hudson entered the Dusty Rhodes Tag Team Classic but lost in the first round to Joaquin Wilde and Cruz Del Toro of Latino World Order. During this time, Osborne began a romantic relationship with fellow Chase U student Thea Hail and asked her out on a date at NXT Vengeance Day for Valentine's Day which she accepted. After their date on Valentine's Day didn't end well due to Hail being given advice by Jacy Jayne to play hard to get, Osborne and Hail both agreed to remain friends. On the 19 March episode of NXT, Osborne challenged No Quarter Catch Crew's Drew Gulak for the NXT Heritage Cup but lost 2-1 to Gulak after interference from Jayne and Jazmyn Nyx, who turned against Chase U.

In early May 2024, Ridge Holland started associating himself with Chase U. On the 14 May episode of NXT, Andre Chase offered Osborne to be Holland's tag team partner in his match against The Good Brothers (Luke Gallows and Karl Anderson) to Osborne's dissatisfaction. The Good Brothers won the match after another mishap from Holland. On the 21 May episode of NXT, Fallon Henley defeated Hail to qualify for a spot in the six-woman ladder match to crown the inaugural NXT Women's North American Championship at NXT Battleground. Backstage, Osborne got into an argument with Holland for costing Hail the match, to which Chase proposed that both men settle their differences in the ring where Holland defeated Osborne. After the match, Osborne still do not approve of Chase U working with Holland, with Hudson taking Osborne's side. On the 4 June episode of NXT, Osborne and Hudson refused to walk out with Holland for Hail's match against Jazmyn Nyx. Halfway through the match, Osborne and Hudson showed up to ringside to Hail's surprise, to which Nyx used as an advantage to defeat Hail. On the 19 November episode of NXT, Holland, who had subsequently joined and defected Chase U, defeated Chase with the future of Chase U on the line, causing Chase U to disband.

Osborne made his first WWE appearance after Chase U's disbandment on the 12 March 2025 episode of Evolve, where he lost to Meta-Four's Oro Mensah. On 2 May, Osborne was released from his WWE contract.

=== Total Nonstop Action Wrestling (2024) ===
On the 15 August 2024 episode of Impact!, Terry, as Riley Osborne, made his Total Nonstop Action Wrestling (TNA) debut as an NXT representative to defeat Chris Bey and John Skyler in a three-way match to qualify for the Ultimate X match at Emergence, but failed to win the TNA X Division Championship.

== Personal life ==
In December 2023, Terry got engaged to fellow professional wrestler Bea Priestley. They were married in July 2024.
