= NXT No Mercy (2023) =

WWE premium live event

- Promotional poster featuring Tiffany Stratton, Carmelo Hayes, Becky Lynch, "Dirty" Dominik Mysterio, and Ilja Dragunov
- Promotion: WWE
- Brand: NXT
- Date: September 30, 2023
- City: Bakersfield, California
- Venue: Mechanics Bank Arena
- Attendance: 4,954

WWE event chronology
← Previous; Payback	Next → Fastlane

No Mercy chronology
← Previous; 2017	Next → 2024

NXT major events chronology
← Previous; The Great American Bash	Next → Deadline

The 2023 NXT No Mercy was a professional wrestling premium live event (PLE) produced by WWE, held for wrestlers from the promotion's developmental brand, NXT. It was NXT's first annual No Mercy and WWE's 14th overall. The event took place on Saturday, September 30, 2023, at the Mechanics Bank Arena in Bakersfield, California.

Seven matches were contested at the event, including one on the pre-show. While the event was primarily held for NXT, a couple of wrestlers from WWE's main roster brands, Raw and SmackDown, also performed. In the main event, Raw's Becky Lynch defeated Tiffany Stratton in an Extreme Rules match to retain the NXT Women's Championship. In another prominent match, Ilja Dragunov defeated Carmelo Hayes to win the NXT Championship.

No Mercy was previously held for WWE's main roster, with this being the first No Mercy since 2017. This was also the first No Mercy to be held on a Saturday, and the first to be branded as a "premium live event", a term the company introduced at the start of 2022 to refer to its events airing on traditional pay-per-view (PPV) and via WWE's livestreaming platforms. As a result, it was the first No Mercy to livestream on Peacock in the United States, SonyLIV in India, Disney+ Hotstar in Indonesia, Disney+ in the Philippines, and Binge in Australia, and it was the first No Mercy to not air on traditional PPV as WWE ceased broadcasting NXT's events on PPV in 2022. It was also WWE's last PLE available on the Japanese version of the WWE Network, which merged under Abema in early October. This was also WWE's first PLE in which the company was not owned and controlled by the McMahon family, as the company's sale to Endeavor was finalized on September 12, 2023, with WWE and Ultimate Fighting Championship merging to become divisions of a new entity called TKO Group Holdings, subsequently making this WWE's first PLE under TKO.

== Production ==
=== Background ===
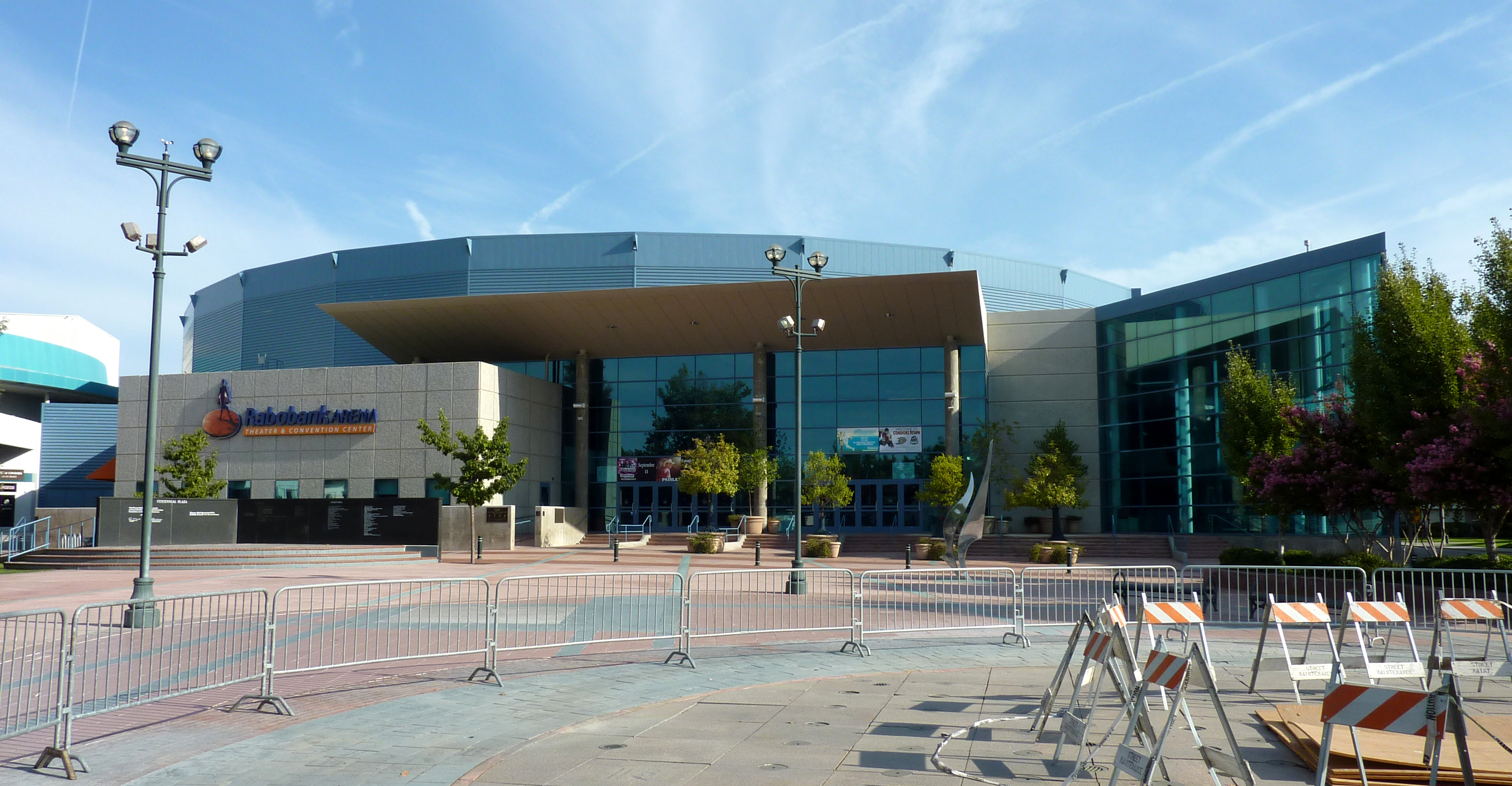
NXT's first annual No Mercy, and WWE's 14th overall, was held at the Mechanics Bank Arena in Bakersfield, California (pictured in 2009 under its previous name of Rabobank Arena).

No Mercy was first held by WWE as a United Kingdom-exclusive professional wrestling pay-per-view (PPV) event in May 1999, before it became the promotion's annual October PPV that same year, but held in the United States until 2008. No Mercy was discontinued in 2009 but it was reinstated in October 2016 following the reintroduction of the brand extension, and that event was the first to be available via livestreaming on the WWE Network. No Mercy, however, was discontinued again following its September 2017 edition as although No Mercy was not on WWE's originally planned schedule for 2018, WWE ended production of brand-exclusive PPV and livestreaming events for the main roster following WrestleMania 34 in April that year, resulting in the reduction of these events produced per year.

On July 27, 2023, WWE announced the return of No Mercy, but this time for its developmental brand, NXT. The 14th No Mercy was scheduled to take place on Saturday, September 30, 2023, at the Mechanics Bank Arena in Bakersfield, California, marking the first No Mercy to be held on a Saturday. This was subsequently the first No Mercy to be branded as a "premium live event" (PLE), a term the company introduced on January 1, 2022, to refer to its events that are available on PPV and via livestreaming.

From January 2023 there had been speculation that WWE had been placed up for sale. Hours before WrestleMania 39 Night 2 began, CNBC reported via multiple sources that a deal between WWE and Endeavor, the parent company of Ultimate Fighting Championship (UFC) via Zuffa, was imminent. The deal involved a merger of WWE with the UFC into a new publicly traded company, with Endeavor holding a 51% stake. The sale was confirmed the next day on April 3, 2023, and was finalized on September 12, with WWE merging with the UFC to become divisions of TKO Group Holdings. NXT No Mercy was in turn WWE's first PLE held in which the company was not owned and controlled by the McMahon family, and subsequently the first PLE under TKO.

=== Broadcast outlets ===
As a result of WWE no longer broadcasting NXT's PLEs on traditional PPV as of 2022, this marked the first No Mercy to not be available on PPV. Instead, it aired on WWE's livestreaming platforms. These included Peacock in the United States, SonyLIV in India, Disney+ Hotstar in Indonesia, Disney+ in the Philippines, Binge in Australia, and the WWE Network everywhere else. This marked the first No Mercy to air on SonyLIV, Peacock, Disney+ Hotstar, Disney+, and Binge, after those countries' respective versions of the WWE Network merged under those services in February 2021, April 2021, January 2022, November 2022, and January 2023, respectively.

=== Storylines ===
The card included seven matches that resulted from scripted storylines. Results were predetermined by WWE's writers on the NXT brand, while storylines were produced on WWE's weekly television program, NXT, and the supplementary online streaming show, Level Up.

At NXT: Heatwave during a celebration with Meta-Four backstage after Noam Dar won the NXT Heritage Cup, Dar received a letter from the Heritage Cup Committee. The letter stated that on the next episode, a global number one contender's tournament would start, and Dar would defend the Heritage Cup against the winner at No Mercy. On August 23 during WWE The Bump, the rules of the "NXT Global Heritage Invitational" were explained. The tournament would be a round-robin style tournament featuring two groups with four wrestlers in each group. Matches would have a 12-minute time limit and victories would earn a wrestler two points, while a 12-minute draw earned both wrestlers one point. The winner of Group A would then face the winner of Group B on the September 26 episode of NXT to determine the number one contender. On August 24, the first two participants were revealed as Tyler Bate in Group A and Joe Coffey in Group B. Two days later, four more contestants were announced: Butch from SmackDown and Charlie Dempsey for Group A and Duke Hudson and Nathan Frazer for Group B. The next day, the last two contestants were announced as Axiom in Group A and Akira Tozawa from Raw in Group B. In the final on September 26, Butch defeated Coffey, earning an NXT Heritage Cup championship match against Dar at No Mercy.

On the September 12, episode of NXT, Baron Corbin praised Bron Breakker for (kayfabe) crushing Von Wagner's skull with the steel steps the previous week. Breakker said he did not attack Wagner to gain Corbin's approval and that he did not want or need Corbin's respect. Breakker then challenged Corbin to a match at No Mercy, which was later made official.

During NXT: Heatwave, NXT Women's Champion Tiffany Stratton named off a list of previous title holders and mistakenly claimed Raw's Becky Lynch as a former champion. At the main roster event Payback, Stratton appeared and apologized to Lynch. After Stratton's successful title defense against Kiana James on the following episode of NXT, Lynch appeared and challenged Stratton to a title match the following week, where Lynch defeated Stratton to win the title for the first time in her career, thus making her a Grand Slam Champion. The following week, Lynch offered Stratton a rematch at any time of her choosing, which was scheduled for No Mercy. After Lynch and Lyra Valkyria defeated Stratton and James in a tag team match later that night, Stratton attacked Lynch, who challenged Stratton to an Extreme Rules match at the event, which Stratton accepted.

At The Great American Bash, Carmelo Hayes defeated Ilja Dragunov to retain the NXT Championship. Almost a month later, Hayes retained the title against Wes Lee at NXT: Heatwave. The following week, Dragunov stated that his goal was to win the NXT Championship, while on Instagram, Lee also expressed his desire to win the title. On the September 5 episode, a match between Lee and Dragunov was scheduled for the following week with the winner facing Hayes for the title at No Mercy, which Dragunov won.

On the August 29 episode of NXT, Mustafa Ali and Dragon Lee argued over who should challenge for the NXT North American Championship, held by Raw's "Dirty" Dominik Mysterio. A match between Ali and Lee with Mysterio serving as the special guest referee was scheduled for the following week with the winner facing Mysterio for the title at No Mercy, which was won by Ali after a fast count by Mysterio. However, on September 21, Ali was among several wrestlers who were released from their WWE contracts. On September 26, Shawn Michaels announced on X that a triple threat match would be held on that night's episode of NXT between Lee, Axiom, and Tyler Bate to determine who would instead challenge Mysterio for the title at No Mercy. That same night, Trick Williams inserted himself into the match, making it a fatal four-way match, which Williams won. It was also announced that Lee would serve as the special guest referee.

== Event ==
Other on-screen personnel
Role:	Name:
Commentators	Vic Joseph
Commentators	Booker T
Spanish commentators	Marcelo Rodríguez
Spanish commentators	Jerry Soto
Ring announcer	Alicia Taylor
Referees	Adrian Butler
Referees	Chip Danning
Referees	Dallas Irvin
Referees	Dragon Lee (NXT North American Championship match)
Referees	Derek Sanders
Referees	Jeremy Marcus
Interviewer	McKenzie Mitchell
Pre-show panel	Megan Morant
Pre-show panel	Matt Camp
Pre-show panel	Sam Roberts

=== Pre-show ===
There was only match that took place on the pre-show and it was contested between Kelani Jordan and Blair Davenport. In the closing stages, Davenport delivered a double-stomp for a two-count. As Jordan was attempting a split-legged moonsault, Davenport got her knees up and delivered Flawless Victory and the Falcon Arrow for the victory. After the match, Gigi Dolin came down and attacked Davenport.

=== Preliminary matches ===
The actual PLE opened with Baron Corbin facing Bron Breakker. In the opening stages, Breakker delivered a somersault plancha and a release Northern lights suplex for a two-count. Corbin then delivered a diving clothesline and a vertical suplex for a two-count. Breakker then delivered a double-knee gutbuster. Breakker then delivered the avalanche Frankensteiner and a military press powerslam for a two-count. Corbin then delivered a Death Valley Driver and the Deep Six for a nearfall. As Corbin was attempting the End of Days, Breakker countered it into an inside cradle for a nearfall. Corbin then delivered a chokeslam to Breakker onto the announce table, but Breakker immediately delivered a spear to Corbin on the outside. Mr. Stone then came out and attempted a diving crossbody to Breakker, but Breakker caught him and threw him onto the security team. Corbin then delivered the End of Days and pinned Breakker for the win.

Next, "Dirty" Dominik Mysterio defended the NXT North American Championship against Trick Williams with Dragon Lee serving as the special guest referee. In the opening stages, Williams delivered a shoulder tackle and a running lariat for a two-count. Dominik then delivered a front dropkick and a knee strike for a two-count. Dominik then delivered a slingshot senton for a two-count. Williams then delivered a leg lariat, but as he was attempting a pop-up haymaker, Dominik countered it into a backslide pin for a two-count. Dominik then delivered the 619 to Williams, but accidentally superkicked Dragon Lee. Williams then delivered a leaping neckbreaker, but Lee was still down. Another referee then came down and counted the pin for a two-count. Dominik then feigned an accidental shoulder tackle to the second referee. As Dominik was attempting the Frog Splash, Williams moved out of the way and delivered a running jumping knee strike and pinned Dominik to win the title.

The next match fatal four-way tag team match in which The Family (Tony D'Angelo and Channing "Stacks" Lorenzo) defended the NXT Tag Team Championship against The Creed Brothers (Brutus Creed and Julius Creed, accompanied by Ivy Nile), the team of Angel Garza and Humberto Carrillo, and OTM (Bronco Nima and Lucien Price, accompanied by Scrypts). In the closing stages, Humberto delivered a springboard crossbody to Julius for a two-count. As D'Angelo was attempting a bodyslam to Angel, D'Angelo's knee gave out and he was carried by the medical team backstage. Humberto and Angel then delivered Total Elimination to Stacks for a two-count. Brutus then locked in an ankle lock on Angel, but Humberto broke up the submission attempt with a superkick. D'Angelo then came back out and delivered a spinebuster to Humberto. All the teams then delivered quadriple avalanche suplexes to their opponents. Brutus then delivered the Brutus Ball to everyone on the outside, allowing The Family to deliver Bada Bing, Bada Boom to Price for the win.

In the fourth match, Noam Dar (accompanied by Jakara Jackson, Lash Legend, and Oro Mensah) defended the NXT Heritage Cup Championship against Butch (accompanied by Tyler Bate) in a British Rounds Rules match. In the opening stages, Butch delivered a lariat to Dar. Dar then delivered a low crossbody and a draping DDT to Butch for a two-count. Burch then delivered a sliding knee and the Beats of the Bodhran, but Meta-Four distracted Butch, allowing Dar to deliver the Nova Roller to Butch to score the first fall (Dar 1: Butch 0). Dar then delivered a victory roll pin for a nearfall. Butch then delivered a superkick, a moonsault and the Bitter End to score the second fall (Dar 1: Butch 1). Dar then locked in a bodyscissors sleeper on Butch, but Butch countered it into a triangle choke. Dunne then delivered the X Plex to Dar for another nearfall. Dar then delivered a spinning back elbow and an apron brainbuster for a two-count. Butch then delivered a snap German suplex and a low roundhouse kick, but Mensah delivered an enzeguiri (unbeknownst to the referee), allowing Dar to deliver another Nova Roller, but Butch kicked out. Butch then delivered the Tyler Driver '97 and the Bitter End for another nearfall. Mark Coffey and Wolfgang then came out and attacked Bate. As the referee was distracted, Joe Coffey then came out and delivered All The Best for the Bells, allowing Dar to hit the Nova Roller on Butch and pin him to retain the title (Dar 2: Butch 1).

In the penultimate match, Carmelo Hayes defended the NXT Championship against Ilja Dragunov. In the opening stages, Dragunov delivered a running boot to Hayes. Dragunov then delivered three knife-edge chops and another running boot for a two-count. Dragunov then delivered the Constantine Special and a senton for a two-count. Hayes then delivered a roundhouse kick, but Dragunov then delivered a step-up enzeguiri. As Hayes was attempting La Mistica, Dragunov blocked it and delivered a leaping headbutt, but Hayes then delivered a step-up enzeguiri and a springboard DDT/bulldog combination for a two-count. Dragunov then delivered two German suplexes and a running knee strike. Dragunov then delivered a powerbomb, a turnbuckle Death Valley Driver and the Coast-to-Coast for a nearfall. Dragunov then delivered a deadlift superplex, but as he was attempting the Torpedo Moscow, Hayes impeded it with a Codebreaker. Dragunov then delivered two H-Bombs for a two-count. Hayes then delivered a superkick and a cutter for a nearfall. As Hayes was attempting the Nothing But Net, Dragunov impeded it with a lariat and delivered a top-rope H-Bomb and pinned Hayes to win the title. After the match, Dragunov hugged Hayes.

=== Main event ===
In the main event, Becky Lynch defended the NXT Women's Championship against Tiffany Stratton in an Extreme Rules match. In the opening stages, Lynch wore a helmet and started delivering headbutts to Stratton with the helmet. Lynch then delivered a flying haymaker for a two-count. Stratton then delivered a snap suplex to Lynch on the outside. Stratton then delivered a running hip attack and a running double foot stomp to Lynch for a two-count. Stratton then hit Lynch with a crowbar and a wrench. Lynch then hit Stratton with a sledgehammer. As Becky was attempting the Dis-Arm-Her, Stratton blocked it and delivered a side walk slam for a two-count. Lynch then delivered the Bexploder into a chair and a missile dropkick. Lynch then delivered a reverse DDT to Stratton onto a pile of Barbie dolls. Lynch then put Stratton's head into a trash can and delivered a leg drop. Stratton then delivered a spinebuster and a powerbomb to Lynch onto the steel steps. Lynch then used a fire extinguisher on Stratton and hit her with a barbed wire bat. As Lynch was attempting a powerbomb, Stratton countered it into a hurricarana and delivered a discus lariat. Stratton then delivered a cannonball senton to Lynch onto the announce table and a Swanton Bomb for a nearfall. Lynch then delivered the Manhandle Slam to Stratton for a nearfall. Stratton then delivered a rolling Death Valley Driver, but as she was attempting the Prettiest Moonsault Ever, Lynch moved out of the way and delivered the Manhandle Slam to Stratton onto a pile of chairs and pinned her to retain the title.

== Reception ==
Robert Winfree of 411Mania applauded the NXT Championship match and the NXT Heritage Cup match. He gave the event an 8.5 out of 10. Wrestling journalist Dave Meltzer of the Wrestling Observer Newsletter rated the Kelani-Davenport match 1.5 stars (the lowest rated match on the card), the Corbin-Breakker bout 2.75 stars, the NXT North American Championship match 2.5 stars, the NXT Tag Team Championship match and the Heritage Cup title match 3.75 stars, the NXT Championship match 4.75 stars (the highest rated match on the card), and the main event 4.5 stars.

== Aftermath ==
On the following episode of Raw, Rhea Ripley announced that "Dirty" Dominik Mysterio had a rematch against Trick Williams for the NXT North American Championship on the next night's NXT with the added stipulation that if Mysterio did not regain the title, he would not be welcomed back into The Judgment Day. On NXT, Mysterio defeated Williams to regain the championship and retain his Judgment Day membership thanks to interference from his stablemates, Ripley, Finn Bálor, and Damian Priest, as well as their accomplice, JD McDonagh.

A second NXT No Mercy was scheduled for 2024, becoming the brand's annual September PLE. This was also WWE's last PLE to livestream on the Japanese version of the WWE Network, after Abema and WWE inked a deal to make Abema the exclusive home for WWE Network in Japan on September 28, 2023, which began with the October 2 episode of Monday Night Raw (Tuesday, October 3 in Japan).

== Results ==
No.	Results	Stipulations	Times
1^{P}	Blair Davenport defeated Kelani Jordan by pinfall	Singles match	6:38
2	Baron Corbin defeated Bron Breakker by pinfall	Singles match	9:33
3	Trick Williams defeated "Dirty" Dominik Mysterio (c) by pinfall	Singles match for the NXT North American Championship; Dragon Lee was the special guest referee.	9:28
4	The Family (Tony D'Angelo and Channing "Stacks" Lorenzo) (c) defeated OTM (Lucien Price and Bronco Nima) (with Scrypts), The Creed Brothers (Brutus Creed and Julius Creed) (with Ivy Nile), and Angel Garza and Humberto Carrillo by pinfall	Fatal four-way tag team match for the NXT Tag Team Championship	12:07
5	Noam Dar (c) (with Jakara Jackson, Lash Legend, and Oro Mensah) defeated Butch (with Tyler Bate) by 2–1	British Rounds Rules match for the NXT Heritage Cup	15:54
6	Ilja Dragunov defeated Carmelo Hayes (c) by pinfall	Singles match for the NXT Championship	21:04
7	Becky Lynch (c) defeated Tiffany Stratton by pinfall	Extreme Rules match for the NXT Women's Championship	20:19
(c) / – the champion(s) heading into the match; P / – the match was broadcast on the pre-show

=== NXT Global Heritage Invitational ===
Legend
W Wrestler won group bracket
T Wrestler tied for the top of the group bracket
Wrestler won the match (2 points)
Match ended in a time-limit draw (1 point)
Wrestler lost the match (0 points)

Group A bracket
Group A		Opponent				Score
Group A		Bate	Butch	Dempsey	Axiom	Score
(England) Tyler Bate		—N/a	11:49	7:12	10:08	4
W	(England) Butch	11:49	—N/a	4:50	12:00	5
(United States) Charlie Dempsey		7:12	4:50	—N/a	6:54	0
(Spain) Axiom		10:08	12:00	6:54	—N/a	3

Group B bracket
Group B		Opponent				Score
Group B		Coffey	Hudson	Frazer	Tozawa	Score
T	(Scotland) Joe Coffey	—N/a	3:50	10:12	6:44	4
T	(Australia) Duke Hudson	3:50	—N/a	2:47	6:54	4
T	(Jersey) Nathan Frazer	10:12	2:47	—N/a	2:30	4
(Japan) Akira Tozawa		6:44	6:54	2:30	—N/a	0

Group B Decision; NXT; September 19, 2023			Final; NXT; September 26, 2023
			A1	Butch	Pinfall
			B1	Joe Coffey	12:42
B1	Joe Coffey	Pinfall	B1	Joe Coffey	12:42
B2 B3	Nathan Frazer Duke Hudson	— 12:22
