= NXT Heatwave (2024) =

WWE premium live event

- Promotional poster featuring Lola Vice, Tony D'Angelo, Oba Femi, Trick Williams, and Roxanne Perez with the CN Tower in the background
- Promotion: WWE
- Brand: NXT
- Date: July 7, 2024
- City: Toronto, Ontario, Canada
- Venue: Scotiabank Arena
- Attendance: 9,132

WWE event chronology
← Previous; Money in the Bank	Next → SummerSlam

Heatwave chronology
← Previous; 2023	Next → 2025

NXT major events chronology
← Previous; Battleground	Next → No Mercy

WWE in Canada chronology
← Previous; Money in the Bank	Next → Survivor Series: WarGames

The 2024 NXT Heatwave was a professional wrestling premium live event (PLE) produced by the American company WWE, held exclusively for wrestlers from the promotion's developmental brand, NXT. It was WWE's third annual NXT Heatwave and the 10th Heatwave overall. The event took place on Sunday, July 7, 2024, at the Scotiabank Arena in Toronto, Ontario, Canada as part of Money in the Bank weekend.

Unlike the prior two years, which were held as television specials of NXT, the 2024 event was the first to be broadcast as a PLE, a term the company introduced at the start of 2022 to refer to its events airing on traditional pay-per-view and via livestreaming. This was in turn the first Heatwave to air on WWE's livestreaming platforms, and it would be the only to air on SonyLIV in India, Disney+ Hotstar in Indonesia, Binge in Australia, and the standalone WWE Network in most other international markets as all of these areas except India moved to Netflix in January 2025, with India then making the transition that April. This was also NXT's first PLE to be held in Canada since NXT TakeOver: Toronto in 2019 at the same venue.

Six matches were contested at the event, including one on the Countdown to Heatwave pre-show. In the main event, Ethan Page defeated previous champion Trick Williams, Je'Von Evans, and Shawn Spears in a fatal four-way match to win the NXT Championship by pinning Evans. In other prominent matches, Roxanne Perez defeated Lola Vice to retain the NXT Women's Championship, Kelani Jordan defeated Sol Ruca to retain the NXT Women's North American Championship, and in the opening bout, Oba Femi defeated Wes Lee in a Last Chance match to retain the NXT North American Championship.

The event received a positive reception, with praise going towards the NXT North American Championship, NXT Women’s North American Championship, NXT Tag Team Championship, and NXT Championship matches.

== Production ==
=== Background ===
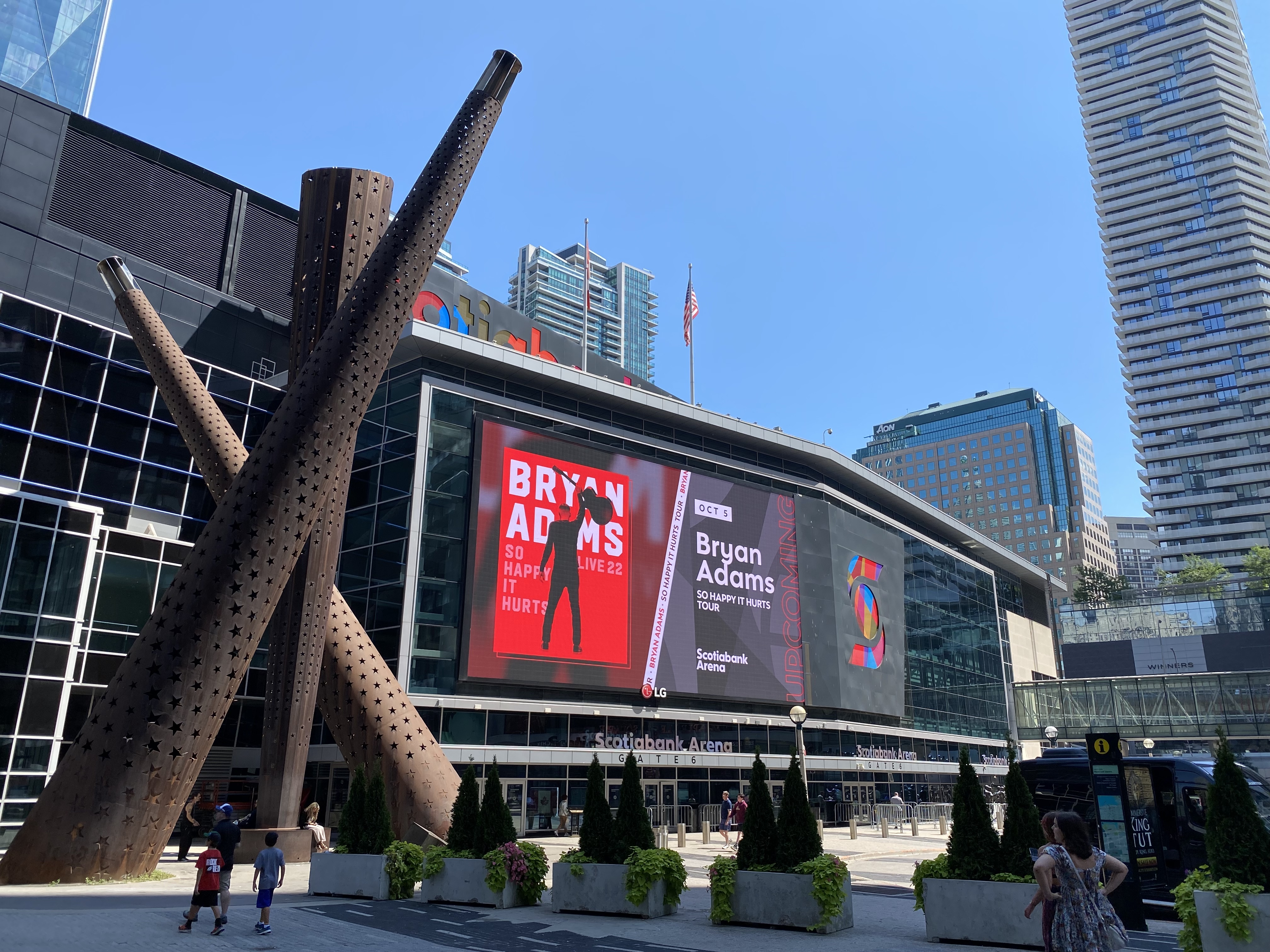
NXT's third annual Heatwave was held at the Scotiabank Arena in Toronto, Ontario, Canada.

Heatwave is a professional wrestling event established in 1994, held during the summer. After Extreme Championship Wrestling folded in 2001, the American promotion WWE acquired its assets in 2003. After 19 years since that acquisition, WWE reinstated Heatwave as its own event for its developmental brand, NXT, in 2022, becoming an annual television special of the NXT program.

On January 4, 2024, it was announced that WWE's third NXT Heatwave, and the 10th Heatwave overall, would be held on Sunday, July 7, 2024, at the Scotiabank Arena in Toronto, Ontario, Canada. It was the third show of what WWE promoted as a three-night "Money in the Bank Weekend" event at the venue, with the live broadcast of Friday Night SmackDown on July 5 and then Money in the Bank itself on July 6. Instead of airing as a television special like the previous two years, the 2024 Heatwave was scheduled to be held as a premium live event (PLE). This was subsequently the first Heatwave to be branded as a PLE, a term the company introduced on January 1, 2022, to refer to its events that are available on pay-per-view (PPV) and via livestreaming. This was also NXT's first PLE to be held in Canada since NXT TakeOver: Toronto in 2019 at the same venue. Tickets for all three Money in the Bank weekend events went on sale on March 15, 2024, with combo and hospitality packages available.

=== Broadcast outlets ===
The PLE was broadcast on WWE's livestreaming platforms. These included Peacock in the United States, SonyLIV in India, Disney+ Hotstar in Indonesia, Disney+ in the Philippines, Binge in Australia, Abema in Japan, and the WWE Network everywhere else. As this was the first Heatwave to be held as a PLE, this was the first time for the event to broadcast on these platforms.

Following an announcement made on January 23, this was the only Heatwave to air on the standalone WWE Network in most international markets where it was still available, as well as Disney+ Hotstar and Binge, as its content moved to Netflix in January 2025; a select few territories maintained the standalone WWE Network until early 2026 due to pre-existing contracts before they also merged under Netflix when those contracts expired.

=== Storylines ===
The event comprised six matches, including one on the pre-show, that resulted from scripted storylines. Results were predetermined by WWE's writers on the NXT brand, while storylines were produced on WWE's weekly television program, NXT, and the supplementary online streaming show, Level Up.

At Battleground on June 9, Trick Williams defeated Ethan Page to retain the NXT Championship. On the following episode of NXT, SmackDown's Undisputed WWE Champion Cody Rhodes announced that Williams would be defending his title at Heatwave against the winner of a 25-man battle royal, which was scheduled for next week's episode. The battle royal was won by Je'Von Evans. Later that night, however, Page argued that he was never officially eliminated from the battle royal as he was attacked by Oro Mensah. A match between Evans and Page was scheduled for the main event, which Page won. After the match, Williams and Page brawled while Shawn Spears attacked Evans. The following week, Spears defeated Williams in a non-title match. With Evans, Page, and Spears each having a claim for a title match, NXT General Manager Ava announced that Williams would defend his title against the three men in a fatal four-way match at Heatwave.

On the June 18 episode of NXT, it was announced that Nathan Frazer and Axiom would defend the NXT Tag Team Championship at Heatwave against the winners of a tag team turmoil match, which was scheduled for the following week's episode. The turmoil was won by Chase University (Andre Chase and Duke Hudson).

At Battleground, Oba Femi successfully defended the NXT North American Championship in a triple threat match, which involved Wes Lee. On the following episode of NXT, Femi celebrated his successful title defense before being interrupted by Lee, who requested a title match. Femi accepted, but under the stipulation that if Lee lost, he could never challenge Femi for the title for as long as he was champion. The match was later made official at Heatwave.

At Battleground, Kelani Jordan won a ladder match to win the inaugural NXT Women's North American Championship. On the June 18 episode of NXT, Jordan complimented Sol Ruca and promised to give her a title match. Arianna Grace interrupted, assuming Jordan was talking about her. A match between Grace and Ruca was scheduled for the following week where the winner would face Jordan for the title at Heatwave, which Ruca won.

At Battleground, Roxanne Perez successfully defended the NXT Women's Championship. On the next episode of NXT, Perez addressed the state of the women's division, with several women stating why they deserved to be Perez's next challenger, which included Lola Vice, who cited her victory over Shayna Baszler in an NXT Underground match at Battleground. The following week, Perez and Vice teamed together in a triple threat tag team match, which they won, only for Perez to attack Vice after the match, turning Vice face for the first time in her career. On the next episode, Vice attacked Perez after her match and stole the title. Later that night, Vice placed the title in the office of NXT General Manager Ava and demanded a title match against Perez at Heatwave, which was later made official.

== Event ==
Other on-screen personnel
Role:	Name:
Commentators	Vic Joseph
Commentators	Booker T
Spanish commentators	Marcelo Rodríguez
Spanish commentators	Jerry Soto
Ring announcer	Mike Rome
Referees	Adrian Butler
Referees	Chip Danning
Referees	Dallas Irvin
Referees	Derek Sanders
Referees	Felix Fernandez
Referees	Jeremy Marcus
Interviewer	Sarah Schreiber
Pre-show panel	Megan Morant
Pre-show panel	Sam Roberts

=== Pre-show ===
On the Countdown to Heatwave pre-show, Karmen Petrovic and Arianna Grace took on Jacy Jayne and Jazmyn Nyx. In the end, Grace performed a Codebreaker on Jayne. Nyx attempted to pin Petrovic, but Grace pulled Nyx's hair so that Petrovic could pin Nyx to win the match.

=== Preliminary matches ===
The actual PLE began with Oba Femi defending the NXT North American Championship against Wes Lee. Lee countered a Super Spirit Bomb into a facebuster and followed up with the Cardiac Kick for a nearfall. Outside the ring, Femi caught Lee and performed a shoulder breaker. In the end, Femi countered a Cardiac Kick attempt and followed up with a thrust kick and Fall from Grace to retain the title. As a result, Lee could not challenge for the title while Femi was the champion.

In the second match, Kelani Jordan defended the NXT Women's North American Championship against Sol Ruca. During the match, Jordan performed a Pele Kick, a Poison Rana, and an Asai Moonsault. Ruca followed up with a Triangle Moonsault and later performed a powerbomb on Jordan for a nearfall. In the climax, Jordan countered a Sol Snatcher attempt for a nearfall. Ruca slammed Jordan in the turnbuckles and as she attempted an Electric Chair from the top rope, Jordan countered into a Poison Rana and followed up with a split-legged moonsault to retain the title.

In a backstage segment, NXT General Manager Ava booked Karmen Petrovic and Arianna Grace in a match against each other for the following episode of NXT.

In the third match, Nathan Frazer and Axiom defended the NXT Tag Team Championship against Chase University (Andre Chase and Duke Hudson, with Thea Hail and Riley Osborne). After several minutes of back-and-forth action, Frazer performed a dropkick on Hudson into the steel steps. Chase performed a High Fly Low on Axiom, but Frazer broke up the pin. Frazer tagged himself in and performed a superplex and a brainbuster on Chase. After Frazer took out Hudson outside the ring, Axiom performed the Golden Ratio on Chase to retain the title.

In the penultimate match, Roxanne Perez defended the NXT Women's Championship against Lola Vice. Throughout the match, Perez focused on Vice's injured hand. After Vice kicked out of Pop Rox, Perez performed Pop Rox on Vice onto the announce table. Perez then applied the crossface on Vice before performing Pop Rox three more times to retain the title.

=== Main event ===
In the main event, Trick Williams defended the NXT Championship against Ethan Page, Je'Von Evans, and Shawn Spears in a fatal four-way match. During the match, Williams performed a legsweep on Spears while Page performed a Doomsday Device on Evans. Spears then knocked out Evans, Page, and Williams with a steel chair. Outside the ring, Evans performed a suicide dive over the ringpost on Williams, who got sent into the barricade. Spears performed a Super Death Valley Driver on Evans, but Page tossed Spears away and pinned Evans himself for a nearfall. Evans performed a Super Spanish Fly and Springboard Cutter, but Williams broke up the pin. Evans performed a Super Cutter and a Corkscrew Splash on Spears, but Williams broke up the pin. Page later performed Ego's Edge on Williams, but Evans placed Williams's foot on the rope to break the pin. Williams performed the Trick Shot on Page and Evans, but was dragged away by Spears while Page pinned Evans to win the title.

== Reception ==
Dave Meltzer of the Wrestling Observer Newsletter rated the matches of this event with his well known star ratings. He gave the highest star rating to the main event, giving it 4.5 stars. He gave the pre-show tag match 1.75 stars, the lowest rated match of the night. He gave the NXT Women's Championship and NXT Tag Team Championship matches 4.25 stars. He gave the North American Championship match 3.25 stars, and the NXT Women's North American Championship match 3.5 stars.

== Aftermath ==
New NXT Champion Ethan Page opened the following episode of NXT to talk about his win at Heatwave. Trick Williams interrupted, wanting a rematch that night. Page rejected and Shawn Spears interrupted, followed by Je'Von Evans, and they engaged in a brawl. Later that night, Williams teamed with Joe Hendry to defeat Page and Spears. Williams would eventually win the title from Page at NXT's CW premiere on October 1.

Also on NXT, Wes Lee talked about his loss at Heatwave and decided to step away from the company. Trey Miguel and Zachary Wentz, Lee's Rascalz stablemates, arrived, and they promised to dominate the tag team division together.

Karmen Petrovic and Arianna Grace had their match on the following episode of NXT, which Petrovic won.

Chase University (Andre Chase and Duke Hudson) would eventually defeat Nathan Frazer and Axiom to win the NXT Tag Team Championship on the August 13 episode of NXT.

In addition to the majority of countries moving to Netflix in January 2025, this would also be the only Heatwave to air on SonyLIV in India following the expiration of WWE's contract with SonyLIV with India then moving to Netflix on April 1, 2025.

== Results ==
No.	Results	Stipulations	Times
1^{P}	Karmen Petrovic and Arianna Grace defeated Jacy Jayne and Jazmyn Nyx by pinfall	Tag team match	7:40
2	Oba Femi (c) defeated Wes Lee by pinfall	Last Chance match for the NXT North American Championship; Since Femi won, Lee could never challenge for the title for as long as Femi was champion.	16:19
3	Kelani Jordan (c) defeated Sol Ruca by pinfall	Singles match for the NXT Women's North American Championship	11:37
4	Nathan Frazer and Axiom (c) defeated Chase University (Andre Chase and Duke Hudson) (with Riley Osborne and Thea Hail) by pinfall	Tag team match for the NXT Tag Team Championship	13:50
5	Roxanne Perez (c) defeated Lola Vice by pinfall	Singles match for the NXT Women's Championship	12:49
6	Ethan Page defeated Trick Williams (c), Je'Von Evans, and Shawn Spears by pinfall	Fatal four-way match for the NXT Championship	17:22
(c) / – the champion(s) heading into the match; P / – the match was broadcast on the pre-show

== See also ==
- WWE in Canada
- Professional wrestling in Canada
