= NXT: Heatwave (2022) =

WWE television special

- Promotional poster featuring various WWE wrestlers
- Promotion: WWE
- Brand: NXT 2.0
- Date: August 16, 2022
- City: Orlando, Florida
- Venue: WWE Performance Center

NXT special episodes chronology
← Previous; The Great American Bash	Next → New Year's Evil

Heat Wave chronology
← Previous; 2000	Next → 2023

The 2022 NXT: Heatwave was a professional wrestling television special produced by WWE, held exclusively for wrestlers from the promotion's developmental brand, NXT 2.0. It was WWE's first annual NXT Heatwave, and the eighth Heatwave overall, and it aired as a special episode of the weekly series NXT 2.0 on the USA Network. The event took place on August 16, 2022, at NXT's home venue, the WWE Performance Center in Orlando, Florida.

This was the first Heatwave event held by WWE, as it was previously produced by the former Extreme Championship Wrestling (ECW) as an annual event from 1994 to 2000. ECW folded in 2001, after which, WWE acquired its assets in 2003, making this the first Heatwave since 2000, which was previously stylized as "Heat Wave"; this 2022 event changed it to "Heatwave". This in turn also made it the first Heatwave to broadcast as a television special and it subsequently became an annual event for NXT. This would also be the only Heatwave in which NXT was referred to as "NXT 2.0" as the brand reverted to simply "NXT" in September.

Five matches were contested at the event. In the main event, Bron Breakker defeated JD McDonagh to retain the NXT Championship. In other prominent matches, Tony D'Angelo defeated Santos Escobar in a Street Fight, which banned Escobar from NXT, and in the opening bout, Carmelo Hayes defeated Giovanni Vinci to retain the NXT North American Championship.

== Production ==
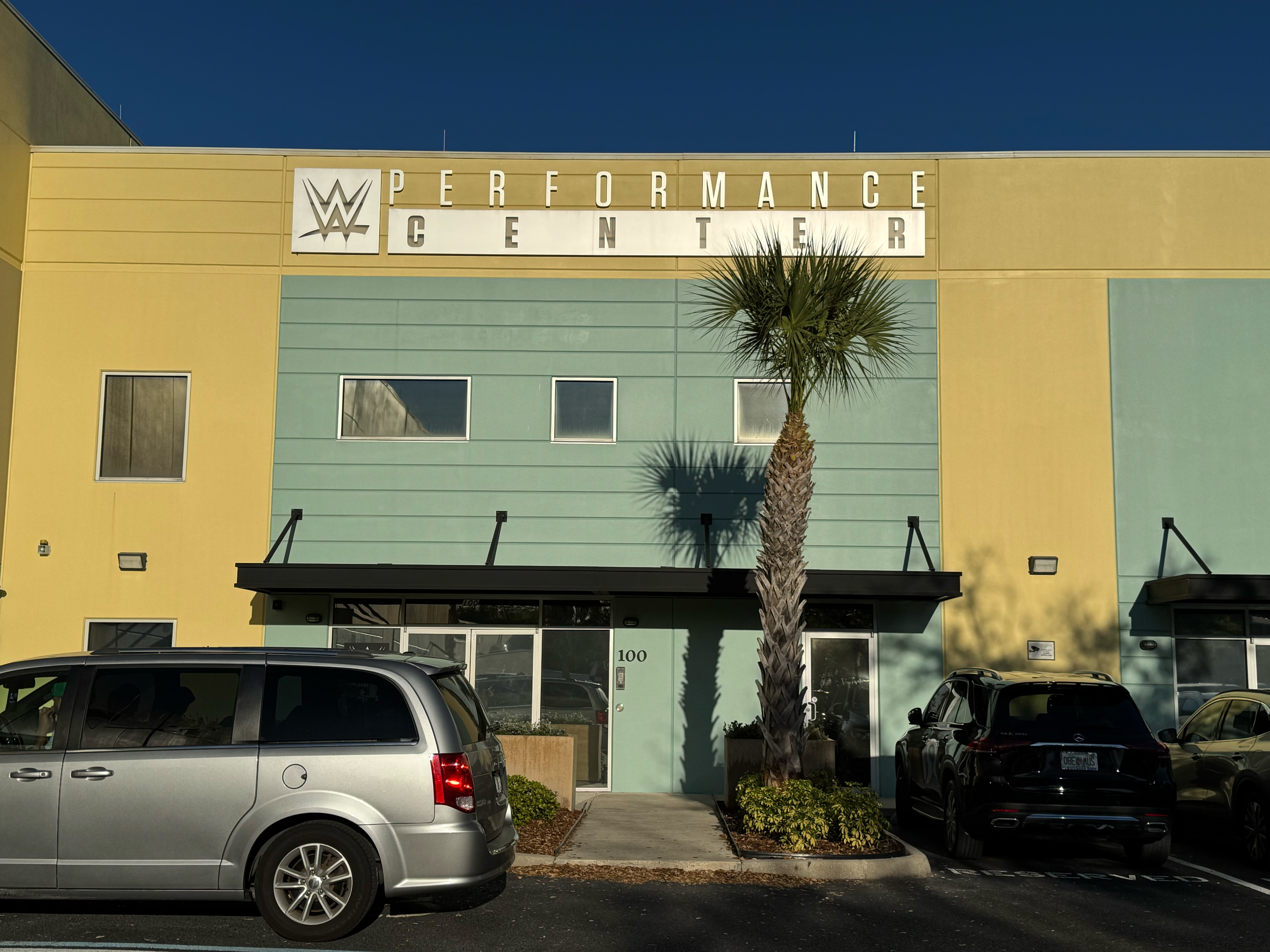
NXT's first annual Heatwave was held at the brand's home venue, the WWE Performance Center in Orlando, Florida.

=== Background ===
Heat Wave was originally the name of a professional wrestling event produced by Extreme Championship Wrestling (ECW) that took place annually from 1994 to 2000. The event's name was a reference to its summer scheduling. The 1997 event was an Internet pay-per-view (iPPV), while the 1998 to 2000 iterations aired on traditional pay-per-view (PPV). ECW folded in 2001, and WWE acquired its assets in 2003.

On the July 26, 2022, episode of NXT 2.0, WWE announced that it would reinstate Heat Wave, but changed to "Heatwave", for its developmental brand, NXT 2.0, to air as a special episode of NXT on August 16, 2022. This marked the first Heatwave since 2000, the first produced by WWE, and the eighth Heatwave overall. The event was held at NXT's home venue, the WWE Performance Center in Orlando, Florida, and aired live on the USA Network.

=== Storylines ===
The card included matches that resulted from scripted storylines. Results were predetermined by WWE's writers on the NXT brand, while storylines were produced on NXT's weekly television program, NXT and the supplementary online streaming show, Level Up.

At NXT: The Great American Bash on July 5, after Bron Breakker's successful NXT Championship defense, he was attacked and put through a table by JD McDonagh. On the August 2 episode of NXT, Breakker and McDonagh signed a contract for an NXT Championship match at Heatwave, with the latter signing it with his blood.

On the July 19 episode of NXT, Zoey Stark, in her first appearance since suffering an injury in November 2021, won a 20-woman battle royal to become the number one contender for Mandy Rose's NXT Women's Championship. The following week, the match was scheduled for Heatwave.

After Cora Jade and Roxanne Perez won the NXT Women's Tag Team Championship at NXT: The Great American Bash, Perez cashed in her women's breakout tournament contract on Mandy Rose for the NXT Women's Championship. The match was scheduled for the July 12 episode of NXT, but Perez failed to win the title due to Jade betraying her. The following week, Jade stated that her friendship with Perez was over before throwing her half of the tag team championship in a trash can. This led to the NXT Women's Tag Team Championship being vacated and a fatal four-way tag team elimination match for the vacant title being scheduled for the August 2 episode of NXT. On the August 9 episode, Jade lost her match after interference from Perez, who attacked Jade with a kendo stick afterwards. Later that night, a match between Jade and Perez was made official for Heatwave.

In the spring of 2022, Legado Del Fantasma (Santos Escobar, Cruz Del Toro, Elektra Lopez, and Joaquin Wilde) began feuding with The D'Angelo Family (Tony D'Angelo, Channing "Stacks" Lorenzo, and Troy "Two Dimes" Donovan). This led to a six-man tag team match at In Your House on June 4 where The D'Angelo Family won, resulting in Legado Del Fantasma joining The D'Angelo Family's stable. With Legado joining The D'Angelo Family, they would accompany each other during matches with them usually losing. On the June 21 episode of NXT, Escobar cost D'Angelo his NXT North American Championship match. At NXT: The Great American Bash, D'Angelo revealed that Escobar was hospitalized and the other members of Legado began working with The D'Angelo Family. Escobar returned on the August 2 episode of NXT, where he cost D'Angelo and Lorenzo their NXT Tag Team Championship match, signaling that their alliance had ended. The following week, D'Angelo and Escobar had one final meeting where they agreed to a Street Fight at Heatwave, with the stipulations being that if D'Angelo won, Escobar and the rest of Legado would be banned from NXT, but if Escobar won, Legado would be free from The D'Angelo Family.

On the August 2 episode of NXT, Carmelo Hayes issued an open challenge for the NXT North American Championship. Giovanni Vinci accepted, but was attacked by Nathan Frazer, who answered the challenge himself. Hayes retained after interference from Vinci. The following week, a match between Vinci and Hayes for the title was scheduled for Heatwave.

== Event ==
=== Preliminary matches ===
The television special began with Carmelo Hayes (accompanied by Trick Williams) defending the NXT North American Championship against Giovanni Vinci. During the match, Vinci attempted a suplex on Hayes, but botched it. Vinci adjusted and performed a brainbuster on Hayes for a nearfall. Hayes performed a Final Cut Suplex on Vinci for a nearfall. Vinci performed a moonsault on Hayes, but Williams placed Hayes' foot on the bottom rope to void the pin. In the climax, Vinci powerbombed Williams onto Hayes. Vinci then performed a Spirit Bomb on Williams and looked to do the same to Hayes, but Hayes reversed into a headscissors takedown to retain the title.

Following this, Diamond Mine (Roderick Strong, Damon Kemp, and NXT Tag Team Champions Julius Creed and Brutus Creed) made their appearance to talk about The Creed Brothers' (Brutus and Julius) success in WWE, only for Gallus (Mark Coffey, Joe Coffey, and Wolfgang) to attack them and stand tall to end the segment.

In the second match, Roxanne Perez took on Cora Jade. In the closing moments, Jade took a kendo stick, but missed Perez. Perez then took the kendo stick and was about to hit Jade with it, but decided not to. Jade took advantage with a DDT onto the kendo stick to win the match.

Afterwards, a backstage segment took place where NXT UK Tag Team Champions Josh Briggs and Brooks Jensen were interrupted by Gallus (Joe Coffey, Mark Coffey, and Wolfgang). A brawl between the two teams followed, setting up a match between the two teams for the NXT UK Tag Team Championship for the following week.

In the third match, Santos Escobar (accompanied by Elektra Lopez, Cruz Del Toro, and Joaquin Wilde) took on Tony D'Angelo (accompanied by Channing "Stacks" Lorenzo) in a street fight. Lorenzo performed a suicide dive on Wilde and Toro outside the ring. Escobar went for the Arrow From the Depths of Hell dive, but D'Angelo intercepted it with a trash can lid shot. Lopez slapped D'Angelo, and Escobar took him out with an Arrow From the Depths of Hell. Toro distracted D'Angelo, allowing Escobar to roll him up for a nearfall. In the climax, as Lopez gave a crowbar to Escobar, D'Angelo tackled her. D'Angelo followed up with a low blow on Escobar, who recovered and performed a twisting thrust kick on D'Angelo when D'Angelo brought the crowbar in the ring. Escobar retrieved brass knuckles and D'Angelo had a crowbar, and D'Angelo struck Escobar with the crowbar first to win the match. As a result, Escobar and the rest of Legado were gone from NXT.

In the penultimate match, Mandy Rose (with Gigi Dolin and Jacy Jayne) defended the NXT Women's Championship against Zoey Stark. Rose slammed Stark's injured leg into the announce table. Dolin and Jayne tripped up Stark. The referee saw this and ejected them from ringside. Afterwards, Dolin and Jayne were sent backstage by Nikkita Lyons. Throughout the remainder of the match, Rose focused on Stark's injured leg. Stark was able to perform the Tilt-a-whirl GTS on Rose, but couldn't capitalize due to the injury, allowing Rose to roll out of the ring. Rose then took of Stark's knee brace and attempted a Bicycle Knee, but Stark countered into a roll-up for a nearfall. In the closing moments, Rose performed a Bicycle Knee on Stark for a nearfall, after which, Rose put the knee brace on before performing a second Bicycle Knee, with an assist from the knee brace, to retain the title.

=== Main event ===
In the main event, Bron Breakker defended the NXT Championship against JD McDonagh. The two started with a chain wrestling sequence that was dominated by Breakker. McDonagh sidestepped a Spear attempt from Breakker, who crashed into the ring post. McDonagh then applied a crossface on Breakker, who made it to the rope to escape. McDonagh performed a Spanish Fly suplex on Breakker and followed up with a brainbuster for a nearfall. In the climax, McDonagh attempted a moonsault, but Breakker avoided it and performed a Spear on McDonagh, who rolled out of the ring to avoid being pinned. When McDonagh returned to the ring, Breakker performed a second Spear on McDonagh, who dared Breakker to perform another. Breakker followed up with a Military Press Powerslam on McDonagh to retain the title. After the match, Breakker was confronted by NXT UK Champion Tyler Bate. The two then held their respective championships in the air as the show ended.

== Aftermath ==
NXT Champion Bron Breakker opened the following episode of NXT to talk about the NXT UK invasion at Heatwave, and being confronted by NXT UK Champion Tyler Bate at the end of the event when Bate interrupted. The two then agreed to a championship unification match for Worlds Collide, where Breakker won to unify the titles.

JD McDonagh would stay in the NXT Championship picture. On the September 20 episode of NXT, he defeated Tyler Bate to earn a rematch against NXT Champion Bron Breakker at a future date. Afterwards, he was confronted by Breakker and Ilja Dragunov, setting up a triple threat match between the three for the NXT Championship at Halloween Havoc.

Cora Jade and Roxanne Perez would also continue their rivalry. On the October 4 episode of NXT, they were guests on the Waller Effect, which was hosted by Grayson Waller. Waller announced another match between the two at Halloween Havoc as a Weapons Wild match after he spun the wheel with it landing on "Weapons Wild".

Gallus (Mark Coffey and Wolfgang) (with Joe Coffey) and Josh Briggs and Brooks Jensen (with Fallon Henley) had their match for the NXT UK Tag Team Championship on the following episode of NXT. The ending came when Lash Legend attacked Henley, leading to Pretty Deadly (Kit Wilson and Elton Prince) brawling with Briggs and Jensen outside the ring. As a result, Gallus won via countout, but Briggs and Jensen retained. The following week, Briggs and Jensen teamed with Henley to take on Wilson, Prince, and Legend in a winning effort after interference from Mark and Wolfgang. Later that night, after Mark, Joe, and Wolfgang defeated Damon Kemp and NXT Tag Team Champions The Creed Brothers (Brutus Creed and Julius Creed), a brawl between the two teams broke out, and Pretty Deadly and Briggs and Jensen got involved in the brawl, leading to a fatal four-way tag team elimination match between the four teams to unify the NXT and NXT UK Tag Team Championships being made official for Worlds Collide.

This ended up being Giovanni Vinci's final NXT appearance, as at Clash at the Castle on September 3, Vinci made his main roster debut, where he and Ludwig Kaiser accompanied Gunther (who defended his Intercontinental Championship against Sheamus at the event), reforming Imperium in the process.

Even through Santos Escobar's loss at Heatwave banned Legado Del Fantasma (Escobar, Joaquin Wilde, Cruz Del Toro, and Elektra Lopez) from NXT, Wilde and Toro had one further match on the following episode of NXT, which they lost. Later that night, Escobar picked up the rest of Legado Del Fantasma and drove away from the Performance Center with them, signaling the end of their time in NXT. They were then promoted to the main roster on SmackDown and debuted on the October 7 episode of SmackDown with a returning Zelina Vega replacing Lopez, who stayed in NXT.

A second NXT Heatwave was confirmed for August 22, 2023, thus establishing Heatwave as an annual August event for NXT. This 2022 event would also be the only Heatwave in which NXT was referred to as "NXT 2.0" as the brand reverted to simply "NXT" in September.

== Results ==
No.	Results	Stipulations	Times
1	Carmelo Hayes (c) (with Trick Williams) defeated Giovanni Vinci by pinfall	Singles match for the NXT North American Championship	11:56
2	Cora Jade defeated Roxanne Perez by pinfall	Singles match	11:41
3	Tony D'Angelo (with Channing "Stacks" Lorenzo) defeated Santos Escobar (with Legado Del Fantasma (Cruz Del Toro, Joaquin Wilde, and Elektra Lopez)) by pinfall	Street Fight; Since D'Angelo won, Escobar was banned from NXT. Had Escobar won, Legado Del Fantasma would have been free from the D'Angelo Family.	12:44
4	Mandy Rose (c) (with Toxic Attraction (Gigi Dolin and Jacy Jayne)) defeated Zoey Stark by pinfall	Singles match for the NXT Women's Championship	11:26
5	Bron Breakker (c) defeated JD McDonagh by pinfall	Singles match for the NXT Championship	13:17
(c) / – the champion(s) heading into the match

== See also ==
- 2022 in professional wrestling
- List of WWE NXT special episodes
