= NXT: Heatwave (2023) =

WWE television special

- Promotional poster
- Promotion: WWE
- Brand: NXT
- Date: August 22, 2023
- City: Orlando, Florida
- Venue: WWE Performance Center

NXT special episodes chronology
← Previous; Gold Rush	Next → Halloween Havoc

Heatwave chronology
← Previous; 2022	Next → 2024

The 2023 NXT: Heatwave was a professional wrestling television special produced by WWE, held for wrestlers from the promotion's developmental brand, NXT. It was WWE's second annual NXT Heatwave, and the ninth Heatwave overall, and it aired as a special episode of the weekly series NXT on the USA Network. The event took place on August 22, 2023, at NXT's home venue, the WWE Performance Center in Orlando, Florida for a second consecutive year. This was NXT's last Heatwave to air as a television special, as it became a premium live event (PLE) in 2024.

Five matches were contested at the event. While primarily held for NXT, a couple of wrestlers from the main roster brand, Raw, also performed. In the main event, Carmelo Hayes defeated Wes Lee to retain the NXT Championship.

== Production ==
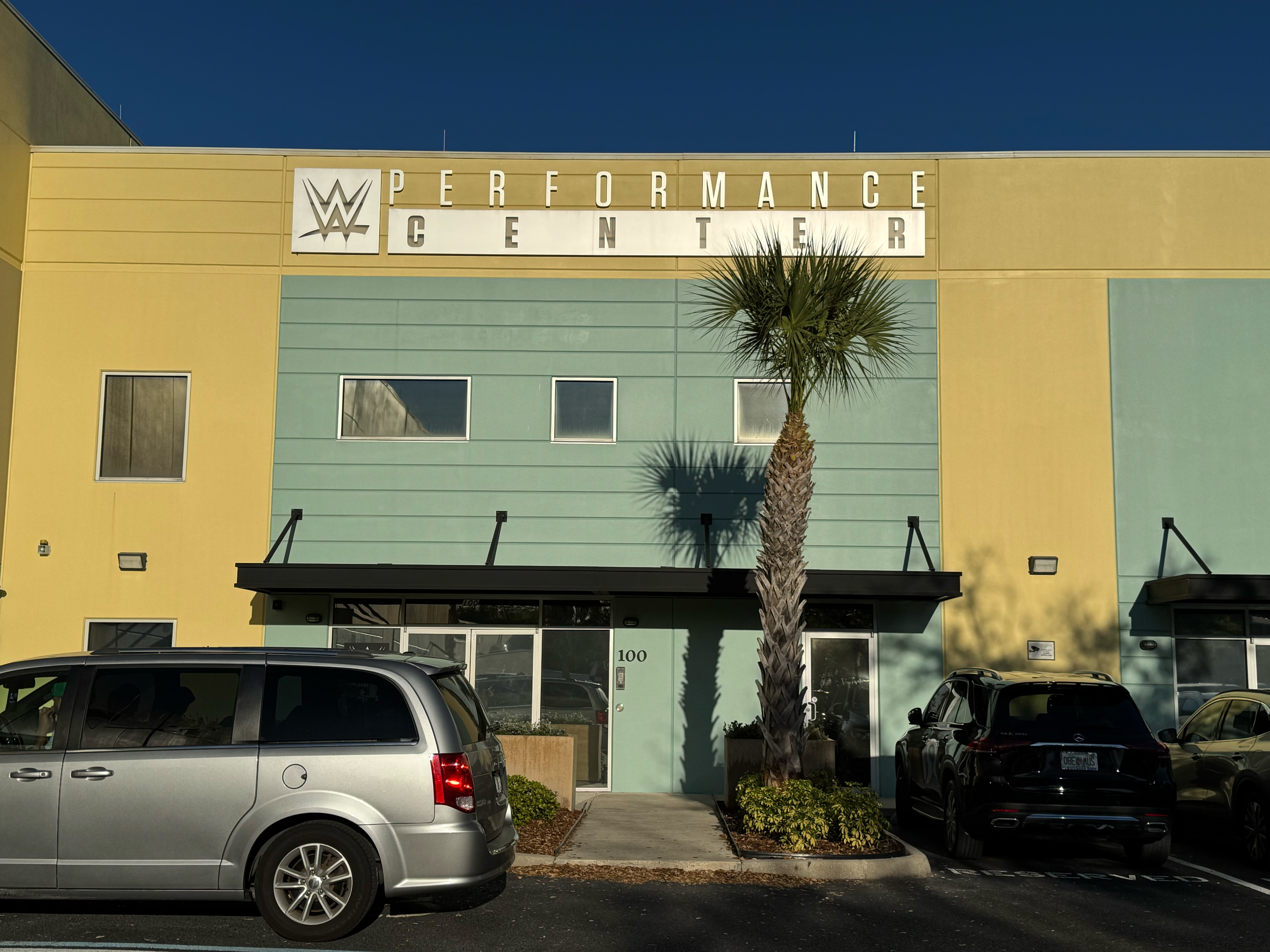
NXT's second annual Heatwave was held at the brand's home venue, the WWE Performance Center in Orlando, Florida for a second consecutive year.

=== Background ===
Heatwave was originally the name of a professional wrestling event produced by Extreme Championship Wrestling (ECW) that took place annually from 1994 to 2000. The event's name was a reference to its summer scheduling. ECW folded in 2001 and WWE acquired its assets in 2003. In August 2022, WWE reinstated Heatwave to be held as a television special of NXT, the weekly program for WWE's developmental brand, NXT.

On the August 8, 2023, episode of NXT, it was announced that WWE's second NXT Heatwave, and ninth Heatwave overall, would be held as the August 22 episode. It took place at NXT's home venue, the WWE Performance Center in Orlando, Florida for a second consecutive year, and aired live on the USA Network.

=== Storylines ===
The card included matches that resulted from scripted storylines. Results were predetermined by WWE's writers on the NXT brand, while storylines were produced on WWE's weekly television program, NXT, and the supplementary online streaming show, Level Up.

During Trick Williams, Carmelo Hayes, and Ilja Dragunov's six-man tag team match on the July 25 episode of NXT, Dragunov accidentally hit Williams. The following week during a backstage segment, Williams told Hayes that he needed to do things for himself, ending their partnership. At the end of the same episode, Dragunov said that he was not finished with Williams. On the August 8 episode, a match between Dragunov and Williams was set for Heatwave.

During Carmelo Hayes and Wes Lee's tag team match on the August 1 episode of NXT, Lee accidentally hit Hayes with a Cardiac Kick, which cost them the match, which caused a post-match argument. The following week, Dijak confronted Hayes and said that he was coming for Hayes's NXT Championship. Lee showed up and got in Hayes's face to talk about the previous week. Dijak interrupted and told Lee that he was no longer in the title picture. Lee stood up to Dijak, who left. Lee looked for Hayes, but was attacked from behind by Dijak, who tossed him around the locker room. Later that same episode, it was announced that Lee would face Dijak to determine the #1 contender for the Hayes's title at Heatwave. On the August 15 episode, Lee defeated Dijak.

On the June 13 episode of NXT, Nathan Frazer defeated Oro Mensah—who wrestled on behalf of Meta-Four stablemate Noam Dar due to Dar suffering an injury—to win the NXT Heritage Cup. Over the next few weeks, Dar became depressed and could not accept that he was no longer champion until the July 25 episode, where Lash Legend and Jakara Jackson gave Dar an "undisputed Heritage Cup", which would snap Dar out of his depressed state. The following week, Tyler Bate caught Meta-Four backstage and challenged Dar to a match for his title. On the August 8 episode, Bate defeated Dar to win his Heritage Cup. Later that same episode, Meta-Four demanded it returned to Dar. Frazer showed up and suggested that Bate could give the cup back as long as Dar acknowledged that Bate's cup was a fake. Dar agreed and Bate returned the cup to him. On the August 15 episode, it was announced that Frazer would face Dar to determine the undisputed NXT Heritage Cup Champion.

On the August 15 episode of NXT, Baron Corbin said he was ushering in a new era for himself during a promo, but was interrupted by Von Wagner and his manager Mr. Stone. Wagner challenged Corbin to a match at Heatwave, which was made official.

Since May, Schism (Joe Gacy, Jagger Reid, Rip Fowler, and Ava) had been feuding with Diamond Mine (Brutus Creed, Julius Creed, and Ivy Nile). On the July 4 episode of NXT, The Dyad (Reid and Fowler) defeated The Creed Brothers (Brutus and Julius) with a stipulation that the losing team had to leave NXT. Over the next few weeks, unidentified individuals wearing Schism masks began costing matches for the group. Schism suspected the masked individuals were the Creed Brothers, but the latter denied involvement. A match between Ava and Nile (the former's debut singles match) was later scheduled for Heatwave.

On the June 27 episode of NXT, during a confrontation between Lyra Valkyria and Jacy Jayne, Women's World Champion Rhea Ripley from Raw showed up to praise Valkyria. Three weeks later, Ripley pulled Valkyria aside in a backstage segment and called her a "badass". Valkyria said she would prove her right, and a match between them was set up for the next week, in which Ripley came out victorious but said Valkyria proved her right. The following week, Dragon Lee interrupted Ripley and her Judgment Day stablemate, NXT North American Champion "Dirty" Dominik Mysterio, and challenged him to a title match the following week, which Mysterio accepted. On the August 8 episode, Valkyria encouraged Ripley to let Mysterio fight his own battles in a backstage segment, but Ripley refused. Later that night, Mysterio defeated Lee to retain his title after interference from Ripley. After this match, Valkyria attacked Ripley. The following week, Ripley and Mysterio challenged Valkyria and Lee to a mixed tag team match at Heatwave, which they accepted and was later made official.

== Aftermath ==
Due to the segment that took place on Heatwave between Tiffany Stratton, Gigi Dolin, Kiana James, Blair Davenport, and Roxanne Perez, a fatal four-way match was announced for the August 29 episode of NXT between the latter four to determine who would face Stratton for the NXT Women's Championship.

Backstage, after Ivy Nile defeated Ava earlier, Nile and The Creed Brothers (Julius Creed and Brutus Creed) (who had earlier been banned from NXT) "kidnapped" Ava. A tag team Steel Cage match was then made official between The Creed Brothers and The Dyad (Rip Fowler and Jagger Reid), with the stipulation being that if The Creeds win, they would be reinstated back in NXT.

After Noam Dar won the NXT Heritage Cup, during a celebration of Meta-Four on backstage, Dar received a letter. The letter stated that next week a global number one contender's tournament would start and Dar will defend against the winner at No Mercy. On August 23 during WWE The Bump, has been revealed a rules of NXT Global Heritage Invitational. Tournament will be a round-robin style tournament featuring two groups with four wrestlers in each group. Matches will have a 12-minute limit, and victories will earn a wrestler two points, while a 12-minute draw would earn both wrestlers one point. The winner of Group A will face the winner of Group B on the September 26 episode of NXT, and the winner of that match would face Noam Dar for the Heritage Cup.

This was NXT's last Heatwave to air as a television special, as it became a premium live event (PLE) in 2024.

== Results ==
No.	Results	Stipulations	Times
1	Ilja Dragunov defeated Trick Williams by pinfall	Singles match	12:48
2	Ivy Nile defeated Ava (with Schism (Jagger Reid, Rip Fowler, and Joe Gacy)) by submission	Singles match	2:12
3	Noam Dar (with Meta-Four (Oro Mensah, Lash Legend, and Jakara Jackson)) defeated Nathan Frazer (c) (with Tyler Bate) 2–1	British Rounds Rules match to determine the Undisputed NXT Heritage Cup Champion	15:40
4	Lyra Valkyria and Dragon Lee defeated The Judgment Day (Rhea Ripley and "Dirty" Dominik Mysterio) by pinfall	Mixed tag team match	14:04
5	Carmelo Hayes (c) defeated Wes Lee by pinfall	Singles match for the NXT Championship	11:38
(c) / – the champion(s) heading into the match

== See also ==
- 2023 in professional wrestling
- List of WWE NXT special episodes
