= The Meta-Four =

Stable
- Name: Meta-Four
- Former members: Noam Dar; Oro Mensah; Jakara Jackson; Lash Legend
- Debut: May 28, 2023
- Disbanded: April 29, 2025
- Years active: 2023–2025

Meta-Four was a professional wrestling stable that performed in WWE on their NXT brand. The stable was led by Noam Dar and included Oro Mensah, Jakara Jackson, and Lash Legend. Dar was a two-time NXT Heritage Cup Champion as part of the stable.

== History ==
At NXT Battleground on May 28, 2023, Noam Dar defeated Dragon Lee to retain the NXT Heritage Cup with assistance from Jakara Jackson, Lash Legend and Oro Mensah. On the June 6 episode of NXT during a backstage segment, Dar accepted Nathan Frazer's challenge to a match for the NXT Heritage Cup and introduced the group as The Meta-Four. On the June 13 episode of NXT, Dar was set to defend his title against Frazer until it was revealed that he had a knee injury. Mensah took Dar's place in the match but lost to Frazer after Valentina Feroz and Yulisa León thwarted Jackson and Legend's attempts to interfere. A match between the two teams would be scheduled for NXT: Gold Rush the following week, in which Jackson and Legend defeat Feroz and León. At NXT: Heatwave on August 22, Dar defeated Frazer to win the NXT Heritage Cup for a record-setting third time. At NXT: Halloween Havoc Night 1, Akira Tozawa returned to NXT and stole the NXT Heritage Cup under The Meta-Four's noses. Tozawa returned the Cup to Dar on Night 2 before managing to spook Dar into a match for the Cup on the following week's NXT, with Dar winning the match 2–1. On the February 20, 2024 episode of NXT, Legend faced Lyra Valkyria for the NXT Women's Championship in an open challenge after Valkyria's initial opponent, Shotzi, suffered a torn ACL halfway through their title match. However, Legend failed to defeat Valkyria for the title. On the February 27 episode of NXT, Dar lost the NXT Heritage Cup to Charlie Dempsey after interference from Dempsey's No Quarter Catch Crew stablemates Drew Gulak, Damon Kemp and Myles Borne, losing the match 2–1 and ending Dar's third reign at 189 days.

On March 26, it was announced that The Meta-Four will be the hosts of NXT Stand & Deliver. At the event, NXT general manager Ava announced the newly created NXT Women's North American Championship, and Legend went through as one of the top 12 participants from the preliminary combine to compete for a spot in the six-woman ladder match to crown the inaugural champion at NXT Battleground. Around this time, Dar started a rivalry with new NXT Champion Trick Williams. During a Supernova Sessions on the May 7 episode of NXT, Dar said that in a match between them where Williams won, Dar's leg was under the ropes which should have broken the pinfall and called Williams a fraud. Dar proceeded to attack Williams shortly after Legend revealed that she was having an affair with Williams. On the May 14 episode of NXT, Dar was found attacked by an unknown assailant. Later that night, Legend defeated Diamond Mine's Ivy Nile from Raw to qualify for a spot at NXT Battleground whereas Mensah lost to Je'Von Evans after interference from Williams. Later that night, Mensah was also found attacked backstage. On the May 28 episode of NXT, a debuting Ethan Page revealed himself as Mensah's and Dar's attacker. On the following week, Legend seemingly broke up with Williams. At NXT Battleground, Legend failed to win the NXT Women's North American Championship. With Dar out of action, Mensah began feuding with Page on his behalf, turning Mensah and all of Meta-Four face in the process.

At Week 1 of NXT: The Great American Bash on July 30, Jackson and Legend failed to defeat The Unholy Union (Alba Fyre and Isla Dawn) for the WWE Women's Tag Team Championship. On the following week at Week 2 of NXT: The Great American Bash, Mensah challenged Page for his NXT Championship but lost the match. On the October 11 episode of SmackDown, Legend and Jackson made their main roster debut where they unsuccessfully challenged WWE Women's Tag Team Champions Bianca Belair and Jade Cargill for the title. Legend and Jackson made their second main roster appearance days later on the October 14 episode of Raw, where they costed Damage CTRL (Iyo Sky and Kairi Sane) their WWE Women's Tag Team Championship match from ringside. On the October 18 episode of SmackDown, Legend defeated Piper Niven to win her debut singles match on the main roster. On the October 22 episode of NXT, Legend and Jackson fought Damage CTRL to a no contest after interference from Niven and Chelsea Green. On the following episode of SmackDown, the three brands' general managers announced that Belair and Cargill will defend their titles against Legend and Jackson, Sky and Sane, and Green and Niven in a fatal four-way tag team match at Crown Jewel where Belair and Cargill retained their titles. On the November 29 tape delay episode of SmackDown, Legend replaced Cargill in the preliminary round of the tournament to crown the inaugural Women's United States Championship, where she lost to Michin in a triple threat match also involving Niven.

On the April 22, 2025 episode of NXT, Dar made his return from injury after an eleven-month hiatus, defeating Lexis King to win the NXT Heritage Cup for a record-setting fourth time (second time for the stable). On the following week, the group met up in a backstage segment in which they announced their mutual agreement to disband, citing personal singles ventures. On May 2, Jackson and Mensah were released from their WWE contracts.

== Championships and accomplishments ==
- WWE
  - NXT Heritage Cup (2 times) – Dar
