= Oba Femi =

Nigerian professional wrestler (born 1998)

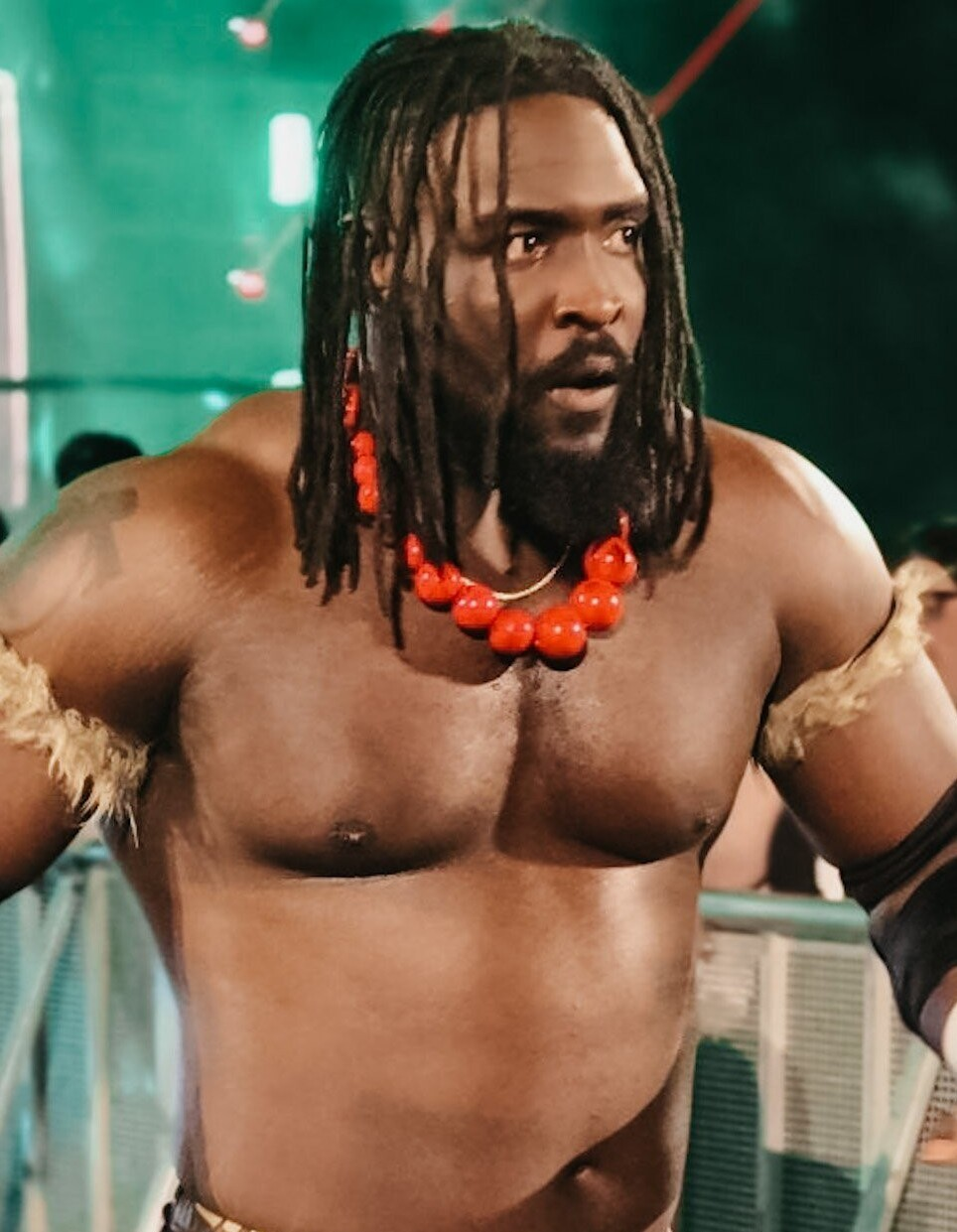
- Femi in 2024

Personal information
- Born: Torioluwa Oshiumi Isaac Odugbesan; April 22, 1998 (age 28) Lagos, Nigeria
- Education: University of Alabama

Professional wrestling career
- Ring name(s): Isaac Odugbesan; Oba Femi
- Billed height: 6 ft 6 in (1.98 m)
- Billed weight: 302 lb (137 kg)
- Billed from: Lagos, Nigeria
- Trained by: WWE Performance Center
- Debut: November 11, 2022

Torioluwa Oshiumi Isaac Odugbesan (born April 22, 1998) is a Nigerian professional wrestler. He is signed to WWE, where he performs on the Raw brand under the ring name Oba Femi and is the incumbent King of the Ring.

Femi is a former two-time NXT Champion, and a former one-time NXT North American Champion. He also retired Brock Lesnar, by defeating him in his final match.

== Early life ==
Isaac Odugbesan was born in Lagos and is the son of Maria and Niyi Odugbesan. He has been a fan of professional wrestling since the age of six, with Triple H and The Undertaker being his favourite wrestlers. Odugbesan attended the University of Lagos, where he won ten shot put medals in the Nigerian University Games Association during his freshman season in 2016.

In the fall of 2017, Odugbesan relocated to the United States to attend Middle Tennessee State University on a track and field scholarship, being named Conference USA Male Freshmen of the Year and an outdoor first-team All-USA selection. Odugbesan transferred to the University of Alabama in 2019, where he majored in studio arts and won the shot put title at the SEC Indoor Track and Field Championships in 2021 and 2022, also winning the outdoor title the year prior. He graduated in May 2022 with a degree in visual arts.

== Professional wrestling career ==
=== WWE (2021–present) ===
==== NXT (2021–2026) ====
After participating in a WWE tryout in August 2021, Odugbesan signed with the company on December 8 as part of its new Next In Line program to develop college athletes into potential WWE wrestlers. In August 2022, he reported to the WWE Performance Center. On the following month, Odugbesan made his first NXT on-screen appearance as a student of Chase University during a pep rally segment. He made his in-ring debut at an NXT live event on November 11, losing to Channing "Stacks" Lorenzo. Under the ring name Oba Femi, he made his on-screen ring debut on the November 18 episode of NXT Level Up, losing to Dante Chen. In his formal NXT debut, Femi defeated Oro Mensah at Spring Breakin' on April 25, 2023. After a hiatus from television, he won the 2023 Men's NXT Breakout Tournament by defeating Riley Osborne in the finals on January 2, 2024, at NXT: New Year's Evil, earning a contract for a championship opportunity for a title of his choosing.

The following week, on NXT, Femi cashed in his Breakout Tournament contract and defeated Dragon Lee to win the NXT North American Championship, becoming the first Next In Line (NIL) program graduate to win a championship in WWE while also establishing himself as a heel. Femi would go on to retain the title against Lee at NXT Vengeance Day on February 4, Dijak and Josh Briggs in a triple threat match at NXT Stand & Deliver on April 6, Wes Lee in a triple threat match (also involving Joe Coffey) at NXT Battleground on June 9 and a last chance match at NXT Heatwave on July 7, and Tony D'Angelo at NXT No Mercy on September 1. On October 5, Femi surpassed Wes Lee's 269 day title reign, becoming the longest-reigning NXT North American Champion. At Week 2 of NXT's CW premiere on October 8, Femi lost the title to D'Angelo, ending his reign at a record 273 days and suffering his first loss in 2024 after a 30 match winning streak. He failed to regain the title from D'Angelo in a Tables, Ladders and Scares match on October 27 at NXT Halloween Havoc after interference from The D'Angelo Family.

Following a short hiatus, Femi returned at NXT Deadline on December 7, 2024, where he entered the Iron Survivor Challenge match in place of an injured Eddy Thorpe and won, earning an NXT Championship match at NXT: New Year's Evil on January 7, 2025, where he defeated Trick Williams in a triple threat match also involving Thorpe to win the title, becoming the first NIL program graduate to win a top championship in WWE. He successfully defended the title against Austin Theory and Grayson Waller in a triple threat match at NXT Vengeance Day on February 15. As part of WWE's partnership with TNA Wrestling, Femi appeared on two episodes of Impact! in February. At NXT Roadblock on March 11, Femi defeated TNA X Division Champion Moose to retain the title. Over the following months, he successfully defended the title against Williams and Je'Von Evans in a triple threat at NXT Stand & Deliver on April 19, Myles Borne at NXT Battleground on May 25, Yoshiki Inamura at NXT The Great American Bash on July 12, and Evans at NXT Heatwave on August 24. At NXT No Mercy on September 27, Femi lost the NXT Championship to Ricky Saints, ending his first reign at 263 days, but regained the title on December 6 at NXT Deadline. As a result, Femi wrestled his main roster debut match against Undisputed WWE Champion Cody Rhodes in a non-title Champion vs. Champion match at Saturday Night's Main Event XLII on December 13, which ended in a no-contest after interference from Drew McIntyre. After successfully defending the title against Leon Slater at NXT: New Year's Evil on January 6, 2026, Femi left the NXT Championship belt in the ring. The next day, it was revealed that Femi had officially vacated the title, ending his reign at 32 days.

==== Main roster (2026–present) ====
Over the next several weeks, vignettes of Femi would be shown on both Raw and SmackDown, but not joining any brand. On January 31, Femi entered the Royal Rumble as the first entrant, eliminating five wrestlers before being eliminated by Brock Lesnar. On the March 16 episode of Raw, Femi answered Lesnar's open challenge for WrestleMania 42, defeating him at Night 2 of the event on April 19. Following his victory, Femi began a weekly open challenge series, until Lesnar returned on the May 18 episode of Raw. At Clash in Italy on May 31, Femi lost to Lesnar in a WrestleMania rematch, marking his first loss on the main roster. Femi subsequently entered and won the King of the Ring tournament, defeating Jey Uso in the finals on June 27 at Night of Champions to earn a world title match at SummerSlam. However, he chose to relinquish his world title match and instead challenge Lesnar at SummerSlam in a Hell in a Cell match, which Femi won at Night 1 of the event on August 1, ending their feud. At Sunday Night's Main Event on September 6, Femi defeated Bron Breakker by disqualification after a returning Bronson Reed attacked him. At Money in the Bank on October 10, Femi defeated Reed despite interference from The Vision.

== Championships and accomplishments ==
- Pro Wrestling Illustrated
  - Ranked No. 9 of the top 500 singles wrestlers in the PWI 500 in 2026
- WWE
  - NXT Championship (2 times)
  - NXT North American Championship (1 time)
  - King of the Ring (2026)
  - Men's Iron Survivor Challenge (2024)
  - NXT Men's Breakout Tournament (2023)
  - NXT Year-End Award (3 times)
    - Match of the Year (2024) – vs. Dijak and Josh Briggs at NXT Stand & Deliver
    - Male Superstar of the Year (2024)
    - Match of the Year (2025) – vs. Je'Von Evans and Trick Williams at NXT Stand & Deliver
