= NXT Battleground (2024) =

WWE premium live event

NXT Battleground: Las Vegas
- Promotional poster featuring Roxanne Perez, Oba Femi, Trick Williams, Tony D'Angelo, and Lola Vice
- Promotion: WWE
- Brand: NXT
- Date: June 9, 2024
- City: Enterprise, Nevada
- Venue: UFC Apex
- Attendance: 679

WWE event chronology
← Previous; King and Queen of the Ring	Next → Clash at the Castle

Battleground chronology
← Previous; 2023	Next → 2025

NXT major events chronology
← Previous; Stand & Deliver	Next → Heatwave

The 2024 NXT Battleground, also promoted as NXT Battleground: Las Vegas, was a professional wrestling premium live event (PLE) produced by WWE, held for wrestlers from the promotion's developmental brand, NXT. It was NXT's second annual Battleground, and WWE's seventh overall, and took place on Sunday, June 9, 2024, at the UFC Apex in the Las Vegas suburb of Enterprise, Nevada. Rapper Sexyy Red hosted the event.

The event was originally scheduled for Memorial Day weekend on Sunday, May 26, 2024, at the Enmarket Arena in Savannah, Georgia, which would have put it head-to-head against All Elite Wrestling's (AEW) pay-per-view event, Double or Nothing, like the previous year's event did. However, in partnership with Ultimate Fighting Championship (UFC), WWE's sister company under TKO Group Holdings, the event was pushed back to June 9 and moved to the UFC Apex in Las Vegas, marking WWE's first event held at the venue. NXT Battleground returned to Memorial Day weekend in 2025, once again going head-to-head with AEW's event. This was also the first Battleground to livestream on Abema in Japan and the final Battleground to air on Disney+ Hotstar in Indonesia, Binge in Australia, and the standalone WWE Network in most other international markets, as WWE's content in those areas moved to Netflix in January 2025, as well as the last on SonyLIV in India, which moved to Netflix in April 2025.

Six matches were contested at the event. While the event was primarily held for NXT, a couple of wrestlers from WWE's main roster brands, Raw and SmackDown, also performed, as well as one wrestler from Total Nonstop Action Wrestling (TNA) by way of an agreement between WWE and TNA. In the main event, Trick Williams defeated Ethan Page to retain the NXT Championship. In other prominent matches, Roxanne Perez defeated TNA's Jordynne Grace to retain the NXT Women's Championship, Oba Femi defeated Wes Lee and Joe Coffey in a triple threat match to retain the NXT North American Championship, and in the opening bout, Kelani Jordan won a Ladder match to become the inaugural NXT Women's North American Champion.

== Production ==
=== Background ===
Battleground is a professional wrestling premium live event (PLE) established by WWE in 2013. It was originally held annually for its main roster until 2017, and it was originally broadcast exclusively via pay-per-view (PPV) before it began simulcasting on WWE's livestreaming platforms in 2014. Battleground was discontinued after its 2017 event as WWE ceased producing brand-exclusive PLEs for the main roster brands, Raw and SmackDown, resulting in less of these events held per year. However, in 2023, the company reinstated the event as a PLE for its developmental brand, NXT.

On January 26, 2024, WWE announced a second Battleground for NXT, and WWE's seventh overall, thus establishing it as an annual PLE for NXT. The event was originally scheduled for Memorial Day weekend on Sunday, May 26, 2024, at the Enmarket Arena in Savannah, Georgia, which would have put it head-to-head against All Elite Wrestling's pay-per-view event, Double or Nothing, like the 2023 event did. However, on April 22, 2024, the company announced that in partnership with Ultimate Fighting Championship (UFC), WWE's sister company under TKO Group Holdings, the event would instead be held at the UFC Apex in the Las Vegas suburb of Enterprise, Nevada on Sunday, June 9, with the event also promoted as NXT Battleground: Las Vegas. Tickets went on sale on May 24.

=== Broadcast outlets ===
The PLE was broadcast on WWE's livestreaming platforms. These included Peacock in the United States, SonyLIV in India, Disney+ Hotstar in Indonesia, Disney+ in the Philippines, Binge in Australia, Abema in Japan, and the WWE Network everywhere else. This was the first Battleground to livestream on Abema after the Japanese version of the WWE Network merged under Abema in October 2023.

Following an announcement made on January 23, this was the final Battleground to air on the standalone WWE Network in most international markets where it was still available, as well as Disney+ Hotstar and Binge, as its content moved to Netflix in January 2025; a select few territories maintained the standalone WWE Network until early 2026 due to pre-existing contracts before they also merged under Netflix when those contracts expired.

=== Storylines ===
The event included matches that result from scripted storylines. Results were predetermined by WWE's writers on the NXT brand, while storylines were produced on WWE's weekly television program, NXT, and the supplementary online streaming show, Level Up.

At Stand & Deliver on April 6, NXT General Manager Ava announced a new secondary women's championship, the NXT Women's North American Championship, subsequently making it the first women's secondary championship in WWE. During NXT: Spring Breakin' – Night 2, Ava announced that the inaugural champion would be crowned at Battleground in a six-woman ladder match, with the participants determined through qualifying matches and the participants in those qualifiers would come from the results of an NXT Women's Combine. The combine evaluated the athletes' speed, power, strength, and conditioning with the top 12 moving on to the qualifiers. The top 12 from the combine in order were Sol Ruca, Chase University's Thea Hail, OTM's Jaida Parker, Brinley Reece, The O.C.'s Michin from SmackDown, Fallon Henley, The Meta-Four's Lash Legend, Diamond Mine's Ivy Nile from Raw, Izzi Dame, Kelani Jordan, Tatum Paxley, and Wren Sinclair. The first two qualifying matches took place on the May 14 episode of NXT, where Ruca and Legend defeated Dame and Nile, respectively. On the May 21 episode, Henley and Parker qualified by defeating Hail and Reece, respectively. The last two qualifying matches took place on the May 28 episode, where Michin and Jordan qualified by defeating Paxley and Sinclair, respectively.

At Stand & Deliver on April 6, Oba Femi retained the NXT North American Championship in a triple threat match involving Josh Briggs and Dijak. On the following episode of NXT, while Femi was celebrating his successful title defense, he was interrupted by Raw's Ivar, who wanted a title match. Femi accepted and the match took place at NXT: Spring Breakin' – Night 2, where Femi retained the title. After the match, Wes Lee, who had been sidelined with a back injury since December 2023, made his return and stared down Femi. On the May 14 episode, Lee, Ivar, and Briggs argued over who should get a title match. Femi decided to let the three fight amongst themselves, and a triple threat match between Lee, Ivar, and Briggs was scheduled for the following week, where the winner would face Femi for the title at NXT Battleground. Later that same night, Gallus (Joe Coffey, Mark Coffey, and Wolfgang) made their return and attacked the three competitors. Ivar ended up getting injured and taken out of action for an indefinite period of time. Later, NXT General Manager Ava announced that Joe would replace Ivar in the triple threat match. The following week, both Lee and Joe pinned Briggs, and the two men were considered the winner. Later that night, NXT General Manager Ava set up a triple threat match between Femi, Lee, and Joe for the title at Battleground.

During NXT: Spring Breakin' – Night 1, Raw's Shayna Baszler returned to NXT to accompany Lola Vice in her NXT Underground match against Natalya, also from Raw, who was accompanied by Karmen Petrovic. During Night 2 of the event, Vice won the match. After that, the rivalry between the two teams continued, and on the May 14 episode of NXT, Natalya and Petrovic challenged Baszler and Vice to a tag team match on next week's episode, which was made official. There, Natalya and Petrovic won the match. After that, Vice turned on Baszler, and a brawl started between the two. NXT General Manager Ava then announced a match between the two at NXT Battleground, where Baszler proposed an NXT Underground match, which was made official.

On the May 21 episode of NXT, after talking to Raw General Manager Adam Pearce and SmackDown General Manager Nick Aldis, NXT General Manager Ava announced that Roxanne Perez would be defending the NXT Women's Championship at NXT Battleground against somebody from the main roster, and her opponent would be announced the following week. On the next episode, however, Ava revealed that reigning TNA Knockouts World Champion Jordynne Grace from Total Nonstop Action Wrestling (TNA) would challenge Perez for the NXT Women's Championship at Battleground.

On the February 20 episode of NXT, SmackDown's The O.C. (Luke Gallows and Karl Anderson) made a surprise return to NXT and attacked Axiom and Nathan Frazer. The two teams later entered a tournament for an NXT Tag Team Championship match at Stand & Deliver, which Axiom and Frazer won. On the May 21 episode of NXT, Gallows and Anderson attacked Axiom and Frazer after their successful title defense. One week later, a title match between the two teams was scheduled for Battleground.

On the May 14 episode of NXT, Noam Dar was found attacked backstage by an unknown assailant. Dar's Meta Four stablemates, Oro Mensah and Jakara Jackson assumed NXT Champion Trick Williams attacked Dar, but fellow stablemate Lash Legend defended Williams. The following week, Meta Four interrupted Williams, with Mensah and Jackson still accusing Williams of attacking Dar, but Legend still defended him, saying that Williams knows all about getting jumped backstage due to his recent feud with Carmelo Hayes and that he would not do the same to Dar. On the May 28 episode, Mensah was attacked by the same unknown assailant. Later that night, the unknown assailant was revealed to be the debuting Ethan Page, who attacked Williams and posed with the NXT Championship. The following week, Page (kayfabe) signed a contract with NXT, which granted him a match against Williams for the NXT Championship at Battleground.

== Event ==
Other on-screen personnel
Role:	Name:
Host	Sexyy Red
Commentators	Vic Joseph
Commentators	Booker T
Spanish commentators	Marcelo Rodríguez
Spanish commentators	Jerry Soto
Ring announcer	Mike Rome
Referees	Adrian Butler
Referees	Chip Danning
Referees	Dallas Irvin
Referees	Derek Sanders
Referees	Felix Fernandez
Referees	Jeremy Marcus
Interviewer	Sarah Schreiber
Pre-show panel	Megan Morant
Pre-show panel	Sam Roberts

=== Preliminary matches ===
The PLE began with the ladder match to determine the inaugural NXT Women's North American Champion, featuring Sol Ruca, Jaida Parker, Michin, Fallon Henley, Lash Legend, and Kelani Jordan. In the closing moments, Ruca performed Sol Snatchers on Parker and Henley. After Michin disposed of Ruca, Parker performed a Pele Kick on Michin. Jordan then performed a split-legged moonsault on Michin and retrieved the belt to become the inaugural champion.

In the second match, Nathan Frazer and Axiom defended the NXT Tag Team Championship against The O.C. (Luke Gallows and Karl Anderson). In the climax, Gallows performed a chokeslam on Frazer on the ring apron followed by a Super TKO by Anderson for a nearfall. Axiom performed a Spanish Fly on Gallows and Frazer pinned Anderson with a Phoenix Splash to retain the title.

After that, Shayna Baszler faced Lola Vice in an NXT Underground match. Baszler and Vice were able to escape the other's submission holds throughout the match. In the end, Vice performed a spinning backfist and struck Baszler with mounted strikes to win the match.

In the fourth match, Oba Femi defended the NXT North American Championship against Wes Lee and Joe Coffey in a triple threat match. Lee performed a Cardiac Kick on Coffey, but Mark Coffey pulled the referee out of the ring. Lee then performed a suicide dive on Mark and Wolfgang. Inside the ring, Femi performed two powerbombs on Joe to retain the title.

In the penultimate match, Roxanne Perez defended the NXT Women's Championship against TNA Knockouts World Champion Jordynne Grace. Grace dominated most of the match. Grace performed a Kinniku Buster on Perez for a nearfall. As Perez applied a crossface, Grace countered it into a roll-up for a nearfall. In the end, Tatum Paxley tried to steal the TNA Knockouts World Championship, but Ash by Elegance (who previously wrestled in WWE as Dana Brooke) prevented that from happening, and Grace took them both out. Inside the ring, Grace performed a Death Valley Driver on Perez and attempted a Grace Driver, but Perez countered it into Pop Rox to retain the NXT Women's Championship.

=== Main event ===
In the main event, Trick Williams defended the NXT Championship against Ethan Page. In the climax, Page performed a Border Toss on Williams for a nearfall. After arguing with the referee, Page pummeled Williams in the corner until the referee pulled him away. Williams then performed the Trick Shot on Page to retain the title. After the match, Williams celebrated with host Sexyy Red.

== Aftermath ==
In addition to the majority of countries moving to Netflix in January 2025, this would also be the final NXT Battleground to air on SonyLIV in India following the expiration of WWE's contract with SonyLIV with India then moving to Netflix on April 1, 2025. NXT Battleground would also return to Memorial Day weekend in 2025, once again putting the event head-to-head against All Elite Wrestling's Double or Nothing.

== Results ==
No.	Results	Stipulations	Times
1	Kelani Jordan defeated Sol Ruca, Lash Legend, Fallon Henley, Jaida Parker, and Michin by retrieving the championship belt	Ladder match for the inaugural NXT Women's North American Championship	12:24
2	Nathan Frazer and Axiom (c) defeated The O.C. (Luke Gallows and Karl Anderson) by pinfall	Tag team match for the NXT Tag Team Championship	11:38
3	Lola Vice defeated Shayna Baszler by technical knockout	NXT Underground match	10:17
4	Oba Femi (c) defeated Wes Lee and Joe Coffey by pinfall	Triple threat match for the NXT North American Championship	12:03
5	Roxanne Perez (c) defeated Jordynne Grace by pinfall	Singles match for the NXT Women's Championship	13:57
6	Trick Williams (c) defeated Ethan Page by pinfall	Singles match for the NXT Championship	12:11
(c) / – the champion(s) heading into the match

=== Inaugural NXT Women's North American Championship Tournament ===
Qualifiers; NXT; May 14–28, 2024
Sol Ruca	Pinfall
Izzi Dame	5:38
Lash Legend	Pinfall
Ivy Nile	3:54
Fallon Henley	Pinfall
Thea Hail	10:29
Jaida Parker	Pinfall
Brinley Reece	4:54
Tatum Paxley	9:12
Michin	Pinfall
Kelani Jordan	Pinfall
Wren Sinclair	3:15

Championship match Battleground; June 9, 2024
Sol Ruca	—
Lash Legend	—
Fallon Henley	—
Jaida Parker	—
Michin	12:24
Kelani Jordan	Win
