= NXT Heritage Cup =

Former WWE men's professional wrestling championship

- The NXT Heritage Cup °trophy

Details
- Promotion: WWE
- Date established: September 10, 2020
- Date retired: July 12, 2025

Other names
- NXT UK Heritage Cup (2020–2022); NXT Heritage Cup (2023–2025)
Statistics
- First champion: A-Kid
- Final champion: Channing "Stacks" Lorenzo
- Most reigns: Noam Dar (4 reigns)
- Longest reign: Noam Dar (2nd reign, 341 days) (Note: WWE officially recognizes 292 days due to tape delay.)
- Shortest reign: Mark Coffey (14 days) (Note: WWE officially recognizes 42 days due to tape delay, and thus officially recognize Channing "Stacks" Lorenzo's reign as the shortest at 17 days.)
- Oldest champion: Mark Coffey (32 years, 130 days)
- Youngest champion: A-Kid (23 years, 201 days)
- Heaviest champion: Tony D'Angelo (250 lb (110 kg))
- Lightest champion: A-Kid (154 lb (70 kg))

The NXT Heritage Cup was a men's professional wrestling championship created and promoted by the American promotion WWE. It was a specialized championship for NXT, the promotion's developmental brand, defended exclusively under British Rounds Rules. The inaugural champion was A-Kid while the final champion was Channing "Stacks" Lorenzo.

Unveiled on September 10, 2020, as the NXT UK Heritage Cup, it was originally established as a secondary championship for NXT UK, which was a sister brand of NXT based in the United Kingdom. At Worlds Collide on September 4, 2022, all other NXT UK championships were unified into their respective NXT championship counterparts due to the closure of NXT UK. The Heritage Cup, however, was the only championship from either brand that was not contested at the event. The title then saw months of inactivity until April 4, 2023, when it was transferred to NXT. During Lexis King's reign from January to April 2025, the British Rounds Rules were suspended.

WWE lists the title's official retirement as July 12, 2025, but it remained active on their website for nearly a year until June 2026. Channing "Stacks" Lorenzo won the vacant title by defeating Tony D'Angelo by 2–1 on the June 24, 2025, episode of NXT. During The Great American Bash on July 12, D'Angelo stole the Heritage Cup and threw it off a bridge, after which it was not seen on television again. In June 2026, WWE updated the history, officially retiring the title with Stacks's reign retroactively ending on July 12, 2025.

== History ==
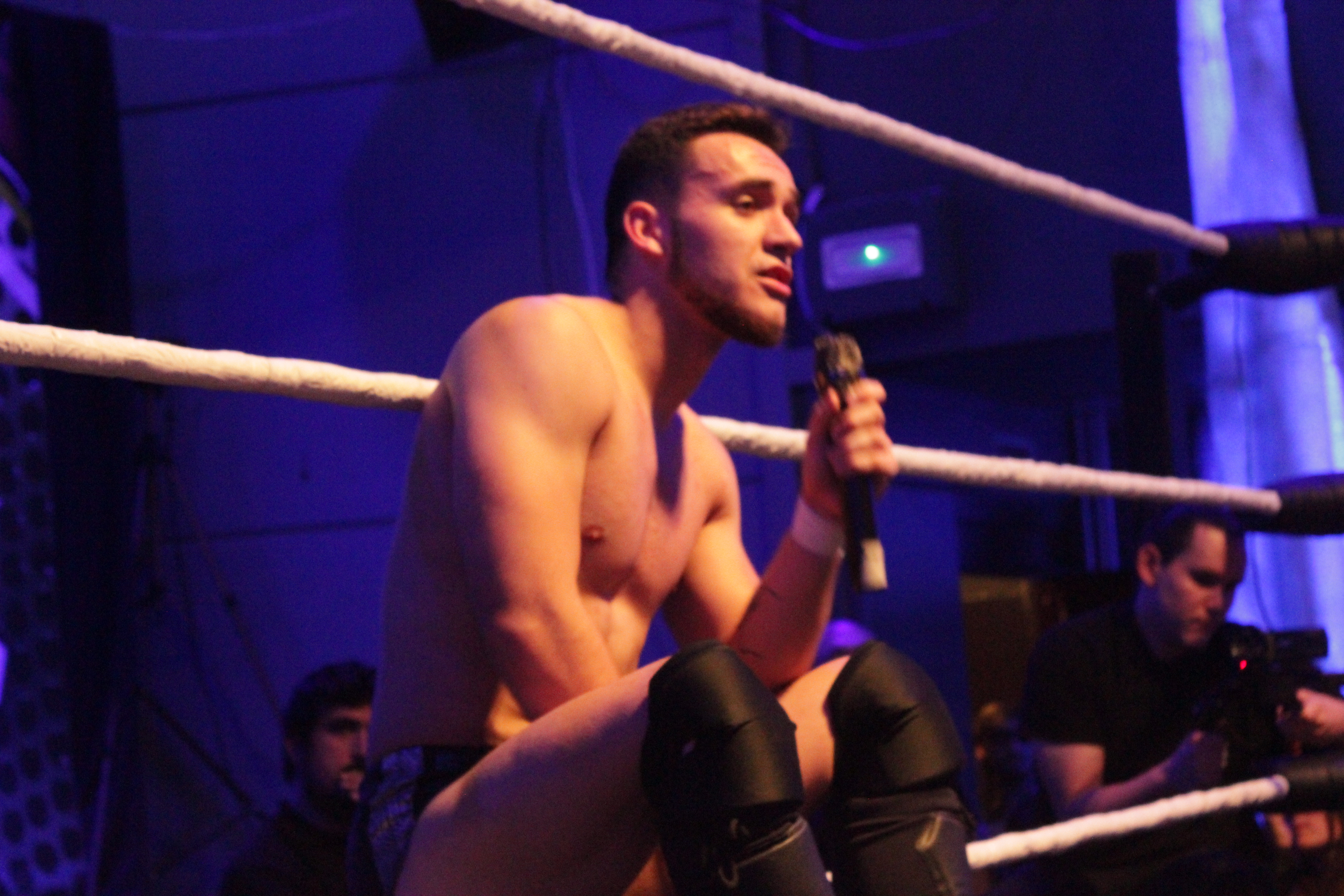
Inaugural champion A-Kid

On September 10, 2020, the American professional wrestling promotion WWE announced the relaunch of the United Kingdom-based NXT UK brand, following a production hiatus since March due to the COVID-19 pandemic. Along with the relaunch, the promotion announced the NXT UK Heritage Cup tournament to crown the inaugural NXT UK Heritage Cup Champion. The announcement also revealed that the Heritage Cup would be defended just like any other championship, but all matches would be contested under British Rounds Rules.

Only seven of the eight competitors for the tournament were revealed during the initial announcement: "Flash" Morgan Webster, Noam Dar, Alexander Wolfe, A-Kid, Dave Mastiff, Trent Seven, and Joseph Conners. The eighth competitor was determined on the October 1 episode of NXT UK in a triple threat match in which Kenny Williams defeated Ashton Smith and Amir Jordan to win the final spot. The tournament itself also began on October 1 and took place across episodes of NXT UK. The final aired on tape delay on November 26 where A-Kid defeated Seven to become the inaugural champion (the date the episode was taped is unknown).

In August 2022, WWE announced that NXT UK would go on hiatus after the Worlds Collide event on September 4, and the brand would relaunch as NXT Europe at a later time. At Worlds Collide, all other NXT UK championships were retired after they were unified into their respective American-based NXT championship counterparts. The Heritage Cup was the only title from either brand to not be contested at the event. The last match for the title occurred during the July 7, 2022, taping of NXT UK, which aired on tape delay on August 25, where Noam Dar became a two-time Heritage Cup Champion. Following this, the title saw months of inactivity until the April 4, 2023, episode of NXT when Dar, with the Heritage Cup, made his NXT debut and stated he would defend the title whenever he wanted. The title was subsequently transferred to NXT and renamed NXT Heritage Cup, with the first NXT defense of the championship coming at NXT Battleground on May 28, which was also the first time the title was defended in the United States.

After Charlie Dempsey won the Heritage Cup in February 2024, his stable, No Quarter Catch Crew, announced the "Catch Clause", where any member of the stable—Dempsey, Drew Gulak, Damon Kemp, and Myles Borne—could defend the Cup, but only Dempsey was officially recognized as champion. The Catch Clause was invoked for the first and only time on the March 19 episode of NXT, with Gulak defeating Chase University's Riley Osborne by 2–1. On the December 24 episode of NXT (taped December 17), Dempsey lost the Heritage Cup to Lexis King by disqualification, the first instance of the Heritage Cup changing hands by disqualification. However, according to NXT general manager Ava, there was a grey area in British Rounds Rules regarding disqualification of the reigning champion, and announced that Dempsey and King would compete for the Heritage Cup in a sudden death one-fall match at NXT: New Year's Evil on January 7, 2025, the first instance of the Heritage Cup not being contested under British Rounds Rules. King won to solidify his win of the Heritage Cup. Subsequently on the February 4 episode of NXT, King announced that his Heritage Cup defenses going forward would be one-fall matches instead of British Rounds Rules. After Noam Dar defeated King on the April 23 episode of NXT to win his record fourth Heritage Cup, the British Rounds Rules were reinstated.

During reigning champion Channing "Stacks" Lorenzo's feud with Tony D'Angelo in mid-2025, the latter stole the NXT Heritage Cup and tossed it off a bridge during The Great American Bash on July 12, 2025. Following this incident, Lorenzo did not appear with the Cup nor was he referred to as champion on-screen, but the championship remained listed as active with Lorenzo as the reigning champion in the official title history on WWE's website. In February 2026, Lorenzo jokingly acknowledged that he was still the champion on social media. On June 3, 2026, WWE's website was updated to list the Cup as retired, with the end date of Lorenzo's reign and the official retirement date listed as July 12, 2025.

=== British Rounds Rules ===
- Matches consisted of six three-minute rounds with 20-second breaks between each round.
- Matches were 2-out-of-3 falls.
- Falls could be won by pinfall, submission, or knockout (countout).
- Once a fall occurred, the round ended.
- The match ended once a wrestler had won two falls.
- In the event of a disqualification or knockout, the match instantly ended without the need for two falls.
- If all six rounds were completed, whoever was ahead on falls won the match. If tied, the champion retained.

== Tournaments ==
Color key

KO	Won the match via knockout
✔	Scored a fall via pinfall
✔	Scored a fall via submission
—	Round ended in a 3-minute time limit draw

=== Inaugural tournament ===
Tournament bracket

Quarterfinals; NXT UK; Aired: October 1–22, 2020
Alexander Wolfe	—	2:48	—	✔	2:57
Noam Dar (Note: Pete Dunne was the special guest referee.)	—	✔	—	0:58	✔
A-Kid	—	2:00	—	✔	✔
Flash Morgan Webster	—	✔	—	0:48	2:57
Dave Mastiff	—	—	KO
Joseph Conners	—	—	0:26
Trent Seven	—	—	✔	0:38	✔
Kenny Williams	—	—	2:57	✔	2:22

Semifinals; NXT UK; Aired: November 5–12, 2020
Noam Dar	—	—	✔	1:26	—	2:11
A-Kid	—	—	2:04	✔	—	✔
Dave Mastiff	—	1:22	—	✔	1:03
Trent Seven	—	✔	—	1:42	✔

Final; NXT UK; Aired: November 26, 2020
A-Kid	—	—	✔	—	—	2:30	✔
Trent Seven	—	—	1:33	—	—	✔	5:17

=== NXT UK Heritage Cup #1 Contender's Tournament ===
Tournament bracket

1st Round; NXT UK; August 12 – September 9, 2021
Mark Andrews	—	—	2:43	✔	2:39
Noam Dar	—	—	✔	1:38	✔
Oliver Carter	—	2:13	✔	1:43
Kenny Williams	—	✔	1:34	✔
Wolfgang	—	—	0:24	✔	✔
Sam Gradwell	—	—	✔	1:49	1:19
Nathan Frazer	—	1:04	—	✔	✔
Teoman	—	✔	—	1:50	2:47

Semifinals; NXT UK; September 16–23, 2021
Noam Dar	—	2:24	—	✔	✔
Kenny Williams	—	✔	—	1:27	2:29
Wolfgang	✔	—	1:12	✔
Teoman	2:01	—	✔	2:15

Final; NXT UK; October 7, 2021
Noam Dar	—	✔	0:06	—	—	✔
Wolfgang	—	1:27	✔	—	—	2:20

== Heritage Cup trophy design ==
Unlike other professional wrestling championships, the Heritage Cup was represented by a trophy instead of a title belt. The trophy itself was a silver cup, the front of which had a gold shield-shaped plaque that had a vertical NXT logo and below it the text "Heritage Cup". Below the cup was a physical representation of what was formerly the NXT UK logo, which was modeled after the United Kingdom's royal coat of arms, featuring a lion and a horse (instead of the traditional unicorn) on either side of the arms in gold, with a red shield at the center which had a gold vertical NXT logo. A small WWE logo was affixed at the center of the X in both NXT logos. A gold banner below this also said "Heritage Cup". This all sat atop a wooden base that was circled in gold name plaques which notated both the reigning and previous champions.

== Reigns ==
Over the title's near six-year history, there were 12 reigns between eight different champions and one vacancy. A-Kid was the inaugural champion. Noam Dar had the most reigns at four and his second reign was the longest at 341 days; however, due to tape delay, WWE officially recognizes his second reign as lasting 292 days, but still the longest. Dar also had the longest combined reign at 850 days (799 days as recognized by WWE due to tape delay). Mark Coffey had the shortest reign at 14 days, but WWE officially recognizes 42 days due to tape delay, and as a result, WWE officially recognize that Channing "Stacks" Lorenzo had the shortest reign at 17 days. Coffey was also the oldest champion at 32 years old, while A-Kid was the youngest at 23. The final champion was Channing "Stacks" Lorenzo.

Name	Years
NXT UK Heritage Cup	September 10, 2020 – April 18, 2023
NXT Heritage Cup	April 18, 2023 – July 12, 2025

Key
No.	Overall reign number
Reign	Reign number for the specific champion
Days	Number of days held
Days recog.	Number of days held recognized by the promotion
N/A	Unknown information
+	Current reign is changing daily

No.	Champion	Championship change			Reign statistics			Notes	Ref.
No.	Champion	Date	Event	Location	Reign	Days	Days recog.	Notes	Ref.
WWE: NXT UK
1	A-Kid	November 26, 2020 (air date)	NXT UK	London, England	1	N/A	174	Defeated Trent Seven by 2–1 in a tournament final to become the inaugural champion. WWE recognizes this reign as beginning on November 26, 2020, and ending on May 20, 2021, when the matches aired on tape delay. The actual dates of when the matches took place are unknown.	
2	Tyler Bate	May 20, 2021 (air date)	NXT UK	London, England	1	N/A	160	Won 1–0. WWE recognizes this reign as beginning on May 20, 2021, and ending on October 28, 2021, when the matches aired on tape delay. The actual date of when the title change took place is unknown.	
3	Noam Dar	October 6, 2021	NXT UK	London, England	1	260	258	Won 2–1 after Bate's partner, Trent Seven, who was ringside, accidentally threw in the towel. WWE recognizes Dar's reign as beginning on October 28, 2021, and ending on July 14, 2022, when the matches aired on tape delay.	
4	Mark Coffey	June 23, 2022	NXT UK	London, England	1	14	42	Won 2–1. Sha Samuels was banned from ringside. WWE recognizes this reign as beginning on July 14, 2022, and ending on August 25, 2022, when the matches aired on tape delay.	
5	Noam Dar	July 7, 2022	NXT UK	London, England	2	341	292	Won 2–1. WWE recognizes this reign as beginning on August 25, 2022, when the match aired on tape delay. Following Worlds Collide in September 2022, the championship saw months of inactivity until it was brought back on the April 4, 2023, episode of NXT, thus transferring the Cup to NXT and was subsequently renamed to NXT Heritage Cup.	
WWE: NXT
6	Nathan Frazer	June 13, 2023	NXT	Orlando, FL	1	70	69	Defeated Oro Mensah by 2–1, who defended the Heritage Cup on behalf of an injured Noam Dar.	
7	Noam Dar	August 22, 2023	NXT: Heatwave	Orlando, FL	3	189	189	Won 2–1.	
8	Charlie Dempsey	February 27, 2024	NXT	Orlando, FL	1	77	76	Won 2–1. At NXT: Roadblock, No Quarter Catch Crew (Dempsey, Drew Gulak, Myles Borne, and Damon Kemp) announced the "Catch Clause" where any member of the stable could defend the Heritage Cup, but only Dempsey was officially recognized as champion. The Catch Clause was invoked on the March 19 episode of NXT, where Gulak defeated Chase University's Riley Osborne by 2–1.	
9	Tony D'Angelo	May 14, 2024	NXT	Orlando, FL	1	91	90	Won 2–1.	
10	Charlie Dempsey	August 13, 2024	NXT	Orlando, FL	2	126	133	Won 2–1. WWE recognizes this reign as ending on December 24, 2024, when the match aired on tape delay.	
11	Lexis King	December 17, 2024	NXT	Lowell, MA	1	126	118	Won 1–0 due to disqualification. WWE recognizes this reign as beginning on December 24, 2024, when the match aired on tape delay. Due to the grey area regarding disqualification of the defending champion in British Rounds Rules, King and Charlie Dempsey faced each other in a one-fall sudden death match at NXT: New Year's Evil on January 7, 2025, that King won to solidify his win of the Heritage Cup. After solidifying his win, King announced that all of his defenses going forward would be one-fall matches instead of British Rounds Rules.	
12	Noam Dar	April 22, 2025	NXT	Paradise, NV	4	60	59	This match was not contested under British Rounds Rules, but the rules were reinstated following Dar's win.	
—	Vacated	June 21, 2025	—	—	—	—	—	Noam Dar vacated the championship due to injury.	
13	Channing "Stacks" Lorenzo	June 24, 2025	NXT	Orlando, FL	1	344	17	Defeated Tony D'Angelo by 2–1 to win the vacant championship.	
—	Deactivated	July 12, 2025	NXT The Great American Bash	—	—	—	—	At the event, Tony D'Angelo stole the Heritage Cup and threw it off a bridge. While the championship remained listed as active on WWE.com, on June 3, 2026, it was retroactively retired on this date.	

== Combined reigns ==
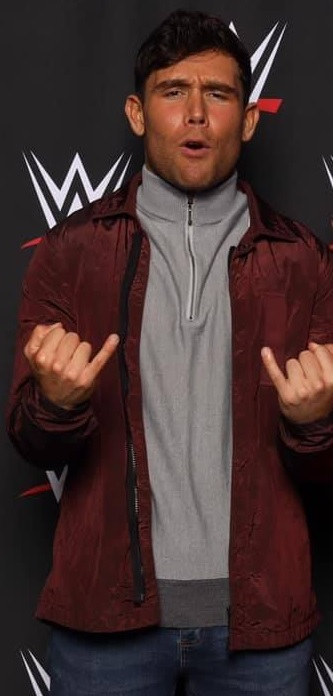
Record four-time champion Noam Dar, whose second reign is the longest-reign for the title at 341 days and he has the most cumulative days as champion at 850 days (292 days and 798 days, respectively, as recognized by WWE due to tape delay).

†	Indicates the current champion

Rank	Wrestler	No. of reigns	Combined days	Combined days rec. by WWE
1	Noam Dar	4	850	798
2	Channing "Stacks" Lorenzo	1	344	17
3	Charlie Dempsey	2	203	209
4	A-Kid	1	N/A (Note: The actual number is undeterminable as both tape dates of when he won and lost the title are unknown.)	174
5	Tyler Bate	1	N/A (Note: The actual number is undeterminable as the tape date of when he won the title is unknown.)	160
6	Lexis King	1	126	118
7	Tony D'Angelo	1	91	90
8	Nathan Frazer	1	70	69
9	Mark Coffey	1	14	42
