= The Unholy Union =

Professional wrestling stable

Tag team
- Members: Alba Fyre; Isla Dawn
- Name(s): The Unholy Union; Alba Fyre and Isla Dawn
- Billed heights: 5 ft 8 in (1.73 m) – Fyre; 5 ft 7 in (1.70 m) – Dawn
- Debut: 31 January 2023
- Disbanded: 8 February 2025
- Years active: 2023–2025

The Unholy Union was a Scottish villainous professional wrestling tag team consisting of Alba Fyre and Isla Dawn. They were best known for their tenures in WWE.

== History ==
=== Feud and formation (2022–2023) ===
On the 15 November 2022 episode of NXT, Fyre wrestled Mandy Rose for the NXT Women's Championship in Last Woman Standing match, a rematch from NXT Halloween Havoc, but she failed to win when a returning Dawn interfered to cost her the match. This led to a match between Fyre and Dawn at NXT Deadline on 10 December where Dawn was victorious. Fyre defeated Dawn in an Extreme Resolution match on the 3 January 2023 episode of NXT, and failed to win the NXT Women's Tag Team Championship three weeks later. Fyre turned heel again and joined forces with Dawn on the 31 January episode of NXT.

=== Women's Tag Team Championship reigns (2023–2025) ===
At NXT Stand & Deliver on 1 April, Fyre and Dawn defeated Fallon Henley and Kiana James to win the NXT Women's Tag Team Championship. As part of the 2023 WWE Draft, Fyre and Dawn were drafted to the SmackDown brand together. Fyre and Dawn made their SmackDown debut on 19 May, defeating Valentina Feroz and Yulisa Leon. On the 9 June episode of SmackDown, Fyre and Dawn were confronted by the WWE Women's Tag Team Champions Ronda Rousey and Shayna Baszler and challenged them to a unification match on the 23 June episode of SmackDown where Fyre and Dawn lost the match, ending their reign at 83 days and were recognised as the final NXT Women's Tag Team Champions. Fyre and Dawn returned on the 22 December episode of SmackDown to attack Damage CTRL during the Holiday Havoc Match.

On Night 1 of the 2024 WWE Draft, both Fyre and Dawn were drafted to the Raw brand. On the 27 May 2024 episode of Raw, Fyre and Dawn interfered in the title match between Shayna Baszler and Zoey Stark against WWE Women's Tag Team Champions Bianca Belair and Jade Cargill, attacking both teams and causing the match to end in no contest. On that week's episode of SmackDown, a brawl occurred between the three teams, ultimately resulting in SmackDown General Manager Nick Aldis booking a triple threat tag team match for the titles at Clash at the Castle: Scotland. At the event on 15 June in their home country of Scotland, The Unholy Union won the titles after Dawn pinned Baszler, making The Unholy Union the second tag team, after Kayden Carter and Katana Chance, to have won the NXT and WWE Women's Tag Team Championships. On 30 July at Night 1 of NXT: The Great American Bash, Fyre and Dawn defeated The Meta-Four (Jakara Jackson and Lash Legend) to retain their titles in the first title defense. On the 2 August episode of SmackDown, Fyre and Dawn defended their titles against Belair and Cargill, which they lost by disqualification after Blair Davenport attacked Cargill, allying herself with The Unholy Union. Since championships do not change hands via countout or disqualification unless otherwise stipulated, Fyre and Dawn remained champions. At Bash in Berlin on 31 August, Fyre and Dawn lost the titles back to Belair and Cargill ending their reign at 77 days. Their last match in WWE was on 14th January, 2025 episode of NXT where they lost to The Meta-Four (Jakara Jackson and Lash Legend)

On 8 February 2025, Dawn was released from her WWE contract officially disbanding the team, while Fyre would then subsequently move to SmackDown, joining Chelsea Green's Secret Hervice stable, before she herself was released in April 2026.

== Championships and accomplishments ==
- Pro Wrestling Illustrated
  - Ranked No. 53 of the top 100 Tag Teams in the PWI Tag Team 100 in 2022
- WWE
  - WWE Women's Tag Team Championship (1 time)
  - NXT Women's Tag Team Championship (1 time, final)
