= WWE Women's Intercontinental Championship =

Professional wrestling championship

- The WWE Women's Intercontinental Championship belt with default side plates

Details
- Promotion: WWE
- Brand: Raw
- Date established: November 25, 2024
- Current champion: Iyo Sky
- Date won: November 16, 2026
Statistics
- First champion: Lyra Valkyria
- Most reigns: Becky Lynch (3 reigns)
- Longest reign: Becky Lynch (1st reign, 163 days)
- Shortest reign: Becky Lynch (3rd reign, 43 days)
- Oldest champion: Becky Lynch (39 years, 78 days)
- Youngest champion: Sol Ruca (26 years, 278 days)
- Heaviest champion: Raquel Rodriguez (175 lb (79 kg))
- Lightest champion: AJ Lee (115 lb (52 kg))

The WWE Women's Intercontinental Championship is a women's professional wrestling championship created and promoted by the American promotion WWE, defended on the Raw brand division. It is one of two secondary women's championships on WWE's main roster, along with the WWE Women's United States Championship on SmackDown. Established in November 2024, the inaugural champion was Lyra Valkyria. The current champion is Iyo Sky, who is in her first reign. She won the title by defeating Raquel Rodriguez on the November 16, 2026, episode of Raw.

== History ==
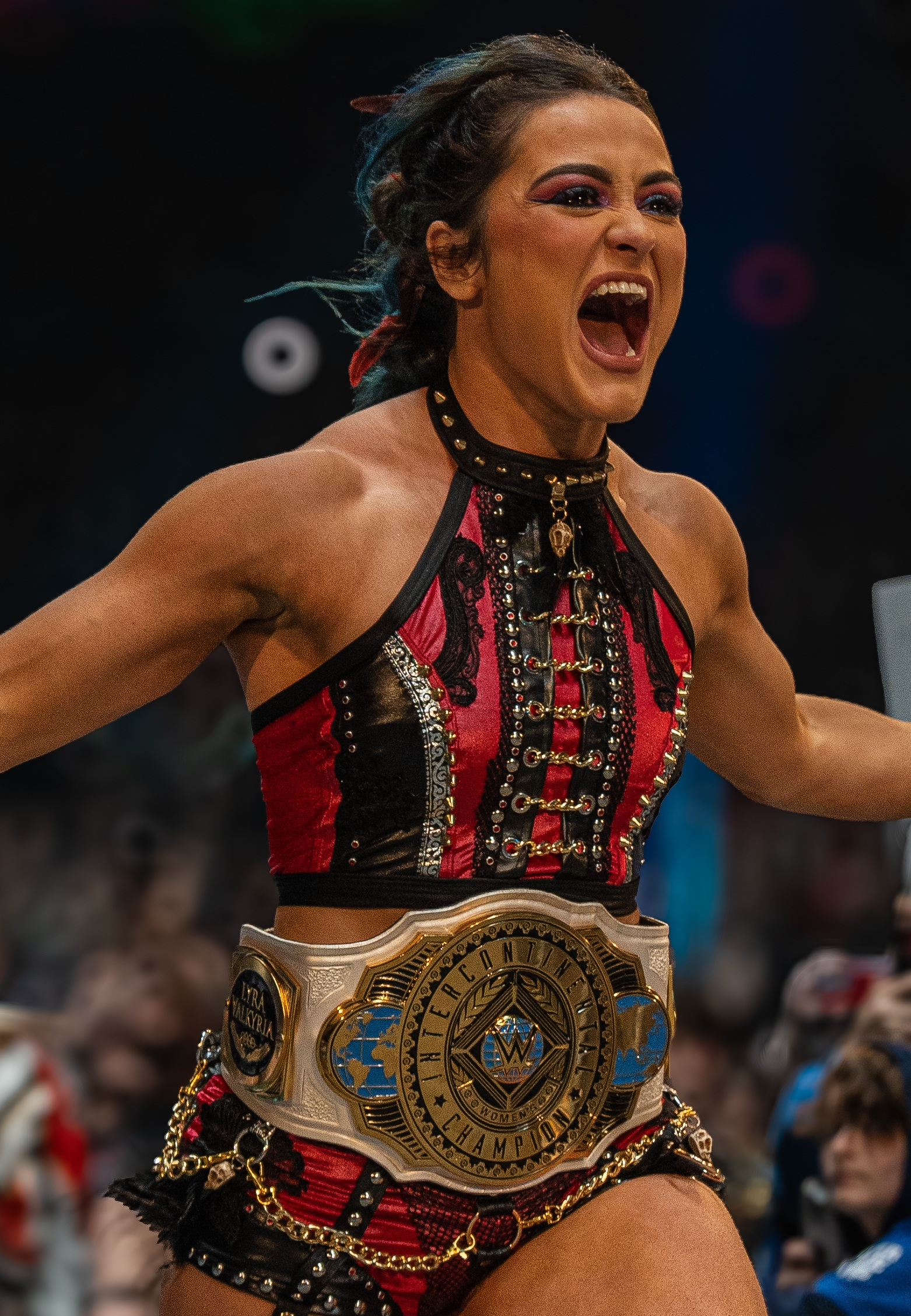
Inaugural champion Lyra Valkyria

The American professional wrestling promotion WWE was founded in April 1963, and recognized a women's world champion from its outset, but it never had a secondary women's championship until April 2024 when the NXT Women's North American Championship was introduced for the developmental brand NXT, followed by the WWE Women's United States Championship for the main roster brand SmackDown in early November. Later that same month prior to the November 25 episode of Raw, the brand's general manager Adam Pearce unveiled the WWE Women's Intercontinental Championship for the main roster women's division on the Raw brand, countering the men's WWE Intercontinental Championship.

The inaugural Women's Intercontinental Champion was determined by a tournament that began on the December 2 episode of Raw. Prior to that episode's broadcast, WWE Chief Content Officer Paul "Triple H" Levesque revealed the tournament bracket, featuring 12 women from the Raw roster in four triple threat matches for the first round, with the winners of each advancing to the semifinals in singles matches, with those winners then facing off in the tournament final on Raw on January 13, 2025. Tournament participants announced were Dakota Kai, Shayna Baszler, Katana Chance, Zoey Stark, Raquel Rodriguez, Kayden Carter, Lyra Valkyria, Zelina Vega, Ivy Nile, Alba Fyre, Kairi Sane, and Natalya. In the tournament final on January 13, Valkyria defeated Kai to become the inaugural champion.

== Tournaments ==
=== Inaugural tournament ===
First round Raw; December 2 – 23, 2024
Katana Chance Shayna Baszler	7:00 —
Dakota Kai	Pinfall
Raquel Rodriguez Kayden Carter	— 9:25
Zoey Stark	Pinfall
Zelina Vega Ivy Nile	— 7:50
Lyra Valkyria	Pinfall
Alba Fyre Natalya	— 8:05
Iyo Sky (Note: Kairi Sane was originally slated to participate, but was attacked backstage by Pure Fusion Collective during the December 16 episode of Raw and was pulled from the tournament. She was replaced by fellow Damage CTRL stablemate Iyo Sky.)	Pinfall

Semifinals; Raw; December 30, 2024
Dakota Kai	Pinfall
Zoey Stark	8:15
Lyra Valkyria	Pinfall
Iyo Sky	11:45

Final; Raw; January 13, 2025
Dakota Kai	8:31
Lyra Valkyria	Pinfall

== Belt design ==
The belt design is identical to the men's version, but like all women's championships in WWE, it is smaller and on a white strap. It also replaced the word "Heavyweight" with "Women's". Like all of WWE's other championship belts, the two side plates feature a removable center section which can be customized with the champion's logos; the default side plates feature a WWE logo over a blue globe.

=== Custom designs ===
One week after winning the title, reigning champion Raquel Rodriguez introduced her own custom design of the title on the August 3, 2026, episode of Raw. It was the standard championship belt but wrapped in barbed wire. However, this custom version was only used for one week as she reverted to the original standard title belt the following week.

== Reigns ==
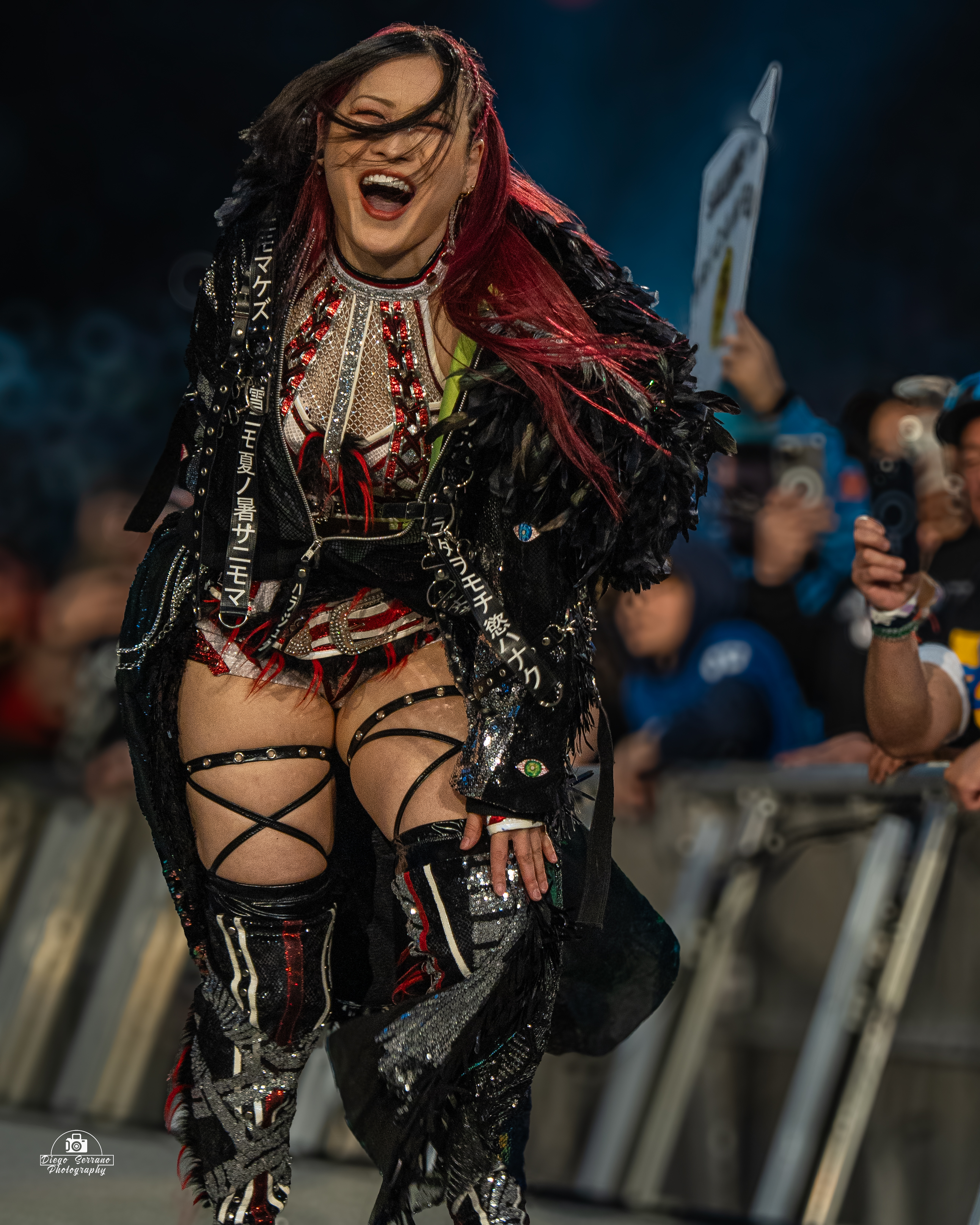
Current champion Iyo Sky

As of November 17, 2026, there have been nine reigns between seven champions. The inaugural champion was Lyra Valkyria. Becky Lynch has the most reigns with three, and she has the records for both the longest and shortest reigns, with her first reign being the longest at 163 days, while her third reign was the shortest at 43 days. Lynch is also the oldest title holder, winning the title for a third time at 39 years old, while Sol Ruca is the youngest at 26.

Iyo Sky is the current champion in her first reign. She won the title by defeating Raquel Rodriguez on the November 16, 2026, episode of Raw in Raleigh, North Carolina.

Key
No.	Overall reign number
Reign	Reign number for the specific champion
Days	Number of days held
Days recog.	Number of days held recognized by the promotion
+	Current reign is changing daily

No.	Champion	Championship change			Reign statistics			Notes	Ref.
No.	Champion	Date	Event	Location	Reign	Days	Days recog.	Notes	Ref.
WWE: Raw
1	Lyra Valkyria	January 13, 2025	Raw	San Jose, CA	1	145	144	Defeated Dakota Kai in a tournament final to become the inaugural champion.	
2	Becky Lynch	June 7, 2025	Money in the Bank	Inglewood, CA	1	163	163	This was a Last Chance match where if Lynch had lost, she would have never been able to challenge for the title again for as long as Lyra Valkyria was champion. Since Valkyria lost, she had to raise Lynch's hand and acknowledge her as the better woman.	
3	Maxxine Dupri	November 17, 2025	Raw	New York, NY	1	49	48		
4	Becky Lynch	January 5, 2026	Raw on Netflix Anniversary Show	Brooklyn, NY	2	54	53		
5	AJ Lee	February 28, 2026	Elimination Chamber	Chicago, IL	1	49	48		
6	Becky Lynch	April 18, 2026	WrestleMania 42; Night 1	Paradise, NV	3	43	42		
7	Sol Ruca	May 31, 2026	Clash in Italy	Turin, Italy	1	57	57		
8	Raquel Rodriguez	July 27, 2026	Raw	Inglewood, CA	1	112	112		
9	Iyo Sky	November 16, 2026	Raw	Raleigh, NC	1	1+	1+		

== Combined reigns ==
As of November 17, 2026.

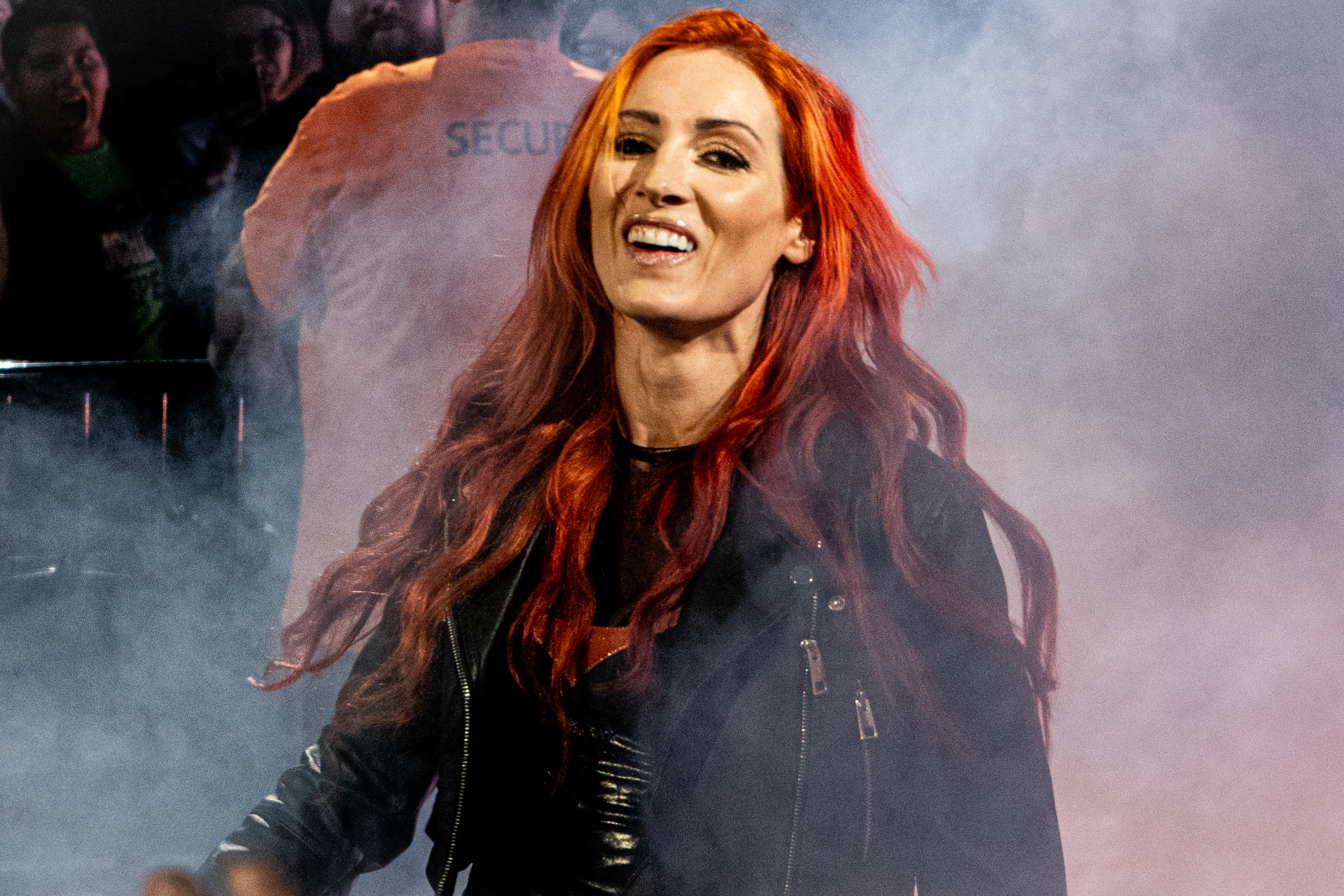
Three-time champion Becky Lynch, who held the title for 260 days combined. Her first reign is the longest reign of the title with 163 days.

†	Indicates the current champion

Rank	Wrestler	No. of reigns	Combined days	Combined days rec. by WWE
1	Becky Lynch	3	260	258
2	Lyra Valkyria	1	145	144
3	Raquel Rodriguez	1	112	
4	Sol Ruca	1	57	
5	AJ Lee	1	49	48
5	Maxxine Dupri	1	49	48
7	Iyo Sky †	1	1+	

== See also ==
- Women's championships in WWE
