= 2024 WWE Draft =

Intra-brand draft

- 2024 WWE Draft logo

General information
- Sport: Professional wrestling
- Date: April 26–29, 2024
- Location: Heritage Bank Center (April 26, 2024); T-Mobile Center (April 29, 2024)

Overview
- League: WWE
- Teams: Raw; SmackDown; NXT (outgoing only)

The 2024 WWE Draft was the 18th WWE Draft produced by the American professional wrestling promotion WWE between their Raw and SmackDown brand divisions. The two-night event began with the April 26 episode of Friday Night SmackDown (in Cincinnati, Ohio) and concluded with the April 29 episode of Monday Night Raw (in Kansas City, Missouri), with SmackDown airing on Fox and Raw on the USA Network. This was the first draft held with WWE under TKO Group Holdings. Draft results went into effect beginning with the May 6 episode of Raw.

== Production ==
=== Background ===
The WWE Draft is a process used by the American professional wrestling promotion WWE while a brand extension, or brand split, is in effect. The original brand extension occurred from 2002 to 2011, while the second and current brand split began in 2016. During a brand extension, the company divides its roster into what they call brands and wrestlers exclusively perform for each brand's respective television show, albeit with some exceptions. The draft is used to refresh the rosters of the brand divisions, typically between the Raw and SmackDown brands, which are regarded as the main roster. Since 2016, wrestlers from WWE's developmental brand, NXT, have been eligible to be drafted to either Raw or SmackDown.

During an appearance on WWE wrestler Logan Paul's podcast Impaulsive on April 5, 2024, WWE Chief Content Officer (CCO) Triple H revealed that the 2024 draft was imminent. Just three days later on April 8, the draft was confirmed for the April 26 and April 29 episodes of Friday Night SmackDown on Fox and Monday Night Raw on the USA Network, respectively. Draft results went into effect beginning with the May 6 episode of Raw, two days after the Backlash France pay-per-view and livestreaming event.

== Selections ==
The draft pools were announced on April 24, 2024. It was also announced that the reigning champions—World Heavyweight Champion Damian Priest, Women's World Champion Becky Lynch, Intercontinental Champion Sami Zayn, and World Tag Team Champions Awesome Truth (The Miz and R-Truth) for Raw and Undisputed WWE Universal Champion Cody Rhodes, WWE Women's Champion Bayley, United States Champion Logan Paul, and WWE Tag Team Champions A-Town Down Under (Austin Theory and Grayson Waller) for SmackDown—were ineligible to be drafted and would remain on their respective brands. While the WWE Women's Tag Team Championship would remain eligible to challengers from all three brands, reigning champions The Kabuki Warriors (Asuka and Kairi Sane) were still eligible to be drafted as the brand that picked them was where they would be assigned upon loss of the title.

=== Night 1: SmackDown (April 26) ===
There were four rounds of draft picks on Night 1 with each brand receiving two picks each round; SmackDown went first due to Night 1 taking place as that night's episode of SmackDown. Draft selections were announced by various WWE Hall of Famers, veterans, and wrestlers. In the first round, Undisputed WWE Universal Champion Cody Rhodes announced SmackDown's picks while Hall of Famer and WWE CCO Triple H announced Raw's. Round two picks were announced by women's wrestling veteran Michelle McCool for SmackDown and Hall of Famer Torrie Wilson for Raw. The third round picks were announced by Hall of Famers The Dudley Boyz (Bubba Ray Dudley and D-Von Dudley), with Bubba announcing SmackDown's and D-Von announcing Raw's. The fourth and final round picks were announced by Hall of Famers Theodore Long for SmackDown and John "Bradshaw" Layfield for Raw.

Round	Brand pick #	Overall pick #	Wrestler(s)	Pre-draft brand	Post-draft brand	Role
1	1	1	Bianca Belair	SmackDown	SmackDown	Female wrestler
1	1	2	Jey Uso	Raw	Raw	Male wrestler
1	2	3	Carmelo Hayes	NXT	SmackDown	Male wrestler
1	2	4	Seth "Freakin" Rollins	Raw	Raw	Male wrestler
2	3	5	Randy Orton	SmackDown	SmackDown	Male wrestler
2	3	6	Bron Breakker	SmackDown	Raw	Male wrestler
2	4	7	Nia Jax	Raw	SmackDown	Female wrestler
2	4	8	Liv Morgan	Raw	Raw	Female wrestler
3	5	9	LA Knight	SmackDown	SmackDown	Male wrestler
3	5	10	Ricochet	Raw	Raw	Male wrestler
3	6	11	The Bloodline (Solo Sikoa, Tama Tonga, and Paul Heyman)	SmackDown	SmackDown	Male tag team with manager
3	6	12	Sheamus	SmackDown	Raw	Male wrestler
4	7	13	AJ Styles	SmackDown	SmackDown	Male wrestler
4	7	14	Alpha Academy (Chad Gable, Otis, Akira Tozawa, and Maxxine Dupri)	Raw	Raw	Mixed stable
4	8	15	Andrade	Raw	SmackDown	Male wrestler
4	8	16	Kiana James	NXT	Raw	Female wrestler

==== Night 1 supplemental picks ====
These wrestlers were included in the Night 1 draft pool, but were not drafted on SmackDown. Their draft selections were revealed on WWE's social media platforms after SmackDown went off air.

Wrestler(s)	Pre-draft brand	Post-draft brand	Role
Alba Fyre and Isla Dawn	SmackDown	Raw	Female tag team
Baron Corbin	NXT	SmackDown	Male wrestler
Cedric Alexander and Ashante "Thee" Adonis	SmackDown	SmackDown (Note: Alexander and Adonis were moved to NXT on July 9, 2024.)	Male tag team
Ivar	Raw	Raw	Male wrestler
Shayna Baszler	Raw	Raw	Female wrestler
The O.C. (Luke Gallows, Karl Anderson, and Michin)	SmackDown	SmackDown	Mixed stable
Zoey Stark	Raw	Raw	Female wrestler

=== Night 2: Raw (April 29) ===
There were six rounds of draft picks on Night 2 with each brand receiving two picks each round; Raw went first due to Night 2 taking place as that night's episode of Raw. Draft selections were announced by various Hall of Famers, veterans, wrestlers, as well as a celebrity. Both Raw and SmackDown's first round picks were announced by Stephanie McMahon. YouTuber and rapper iShowSpeed announced Raw's second round picks while SmackDown's were announced by United States Champion Logan Paul. Round three picks were announced by Hall of Famers John "Bradshaw" Layfield and Ron Simmons of the Acolytes Protection Agency, with Bradshaw announcing Raw's picks and Simmons announcing SmackDown's. The fourth round picks were announced by Hall of Famers Teddy Long and Alundra Blayze, with Long announcing Raw's picks and Blayze announcing SmackDown's. Hall of Famers The Dudley Boyz (Bubba Ray Dudley and D-Von Dudley) returned to announce the fifth round picks, with Bubba announcing Raw's picks and D-Von announcing SmackDown's. The sixth and final round picks were announced by the respective General Managers of Raw and SmackDown, Adam Pearce and Nick Aldis.

Round	Brand pick #	Overall pick #	Wrestler(s)	Pre-draft brand	Post-draft brand	Role
1	1	1	Imperium (Gunther and Ludwig Kaiser)	Raw	Raw	Male tag team
1	1	2	Jade Cargill	SmackDown	SmackDown	Female wrestler
1	2	3	Damage CTRL (Dakota Kai, Iyo Sky, Asuka, and Kairi Sane)	SmackDown	Raw	Female stable WWE Women's Tag Team Champions (Asuka and Sane)
1	2	4	Kevin Owens	SmackDown	SmackDown	Male wrestler
2	3	5	CM Punk	Raw	Raw	Male wrestler
2	3	6	The Pride (Bobby Lashley, Angelo Dawkins, Montez Ford, and B-Fab)	SmackDown	SmackDown	Mixed stable
2	4	7	Braun Strowman	Raw	Raw	Male wrestler
2	4	8	Tiffany Stratton	SmackDown	SmackDown	Female wrestler
3	5	9	Latino World Order (Rey Mysterio, Dragon Lee, Joaquin Wilde, Cruz Del Toro, Zelina Vega, and Carlito) (Note: Carlito left the group during Night 1 of the draft after attacking Dragon Lee and leader Rey Mysterio, but he was still drafted to Raw as part of the group.)	SmackDown	Raw	Mixed stable
3	5	10	Legado Del Fantasma (Santos Escobar, Angel, Berto, and Elektra Lopez)	SmackDown	SmackDown	Mixed stable
3	6	11	Drew McIntyre	Raw	Raw	Male wrestler
3	6	12	Shinsuke Nakamura	Raw	SmackDown	Male wrestler
4	7	13	The Judgment Day (Finn Bálor, "Dirty" Dominik Mysterio, and JD McDonagh)	Raw	Raw	Male stable
4	7	14	Naomi	SmackDown	SmackDown	Female wrestler
4	8	15	Ilja Dragunov	NXT	Raw	Male wrestler
4	8	16	Chelsea Green and Piper Niven	Raw	SmackDown	Female tag team
5	9	17	The New Day (Kofi Kingston and Xavier Woods)	Raw	Raw	Male tag team
5	9	18	Pretty Deadly (Kit Wilson and Elton Prince)	SmackDown	SmackDown	Male tag team
5	10	19	Lyra Valkyria	NXT	Raw	Female wrestler
5	10	20	Candice LeRae and Indi Hartwell	Raw	SmackDown	Female tag team
6	11	21	The Final Testament (Karrion Kross, Akam, Rezar, Scarlett, and Paul Ellering)	SmackDown	Raw	Mixed stable and managers
6	11	22	#DIY (Johnny Gargano and Tommaso Ciampa)	Raw	SmackDown	Male tag team
6	12	23	Bronson Reed	Raw	Raw	Male wrestler
6	12	24	Blair Davenport	NXT	SmackDown	Female wrestler

==== Night 2 supplemental picks ====
These wrestlers were included in the Night 2 draft pool, but were not drafted on Raw. Their draft selections were revealed on WWE's social media platforms after Raw went off air.

Wrestler(s)	Pre-draft brand	Post-draft brand	Role
Apollo Crews	Raw	SmackDown	Male wrestler
Diamond Mine (Brutus Creed, Julius Creed, and Ivy Nile)	Raw	Raw	Mixed stable
Dijak	NXT	Raw	Male wrestler
Giovanni Vinci	Raw	SmackDown	Male wrestler
Kayden Carter and Katana Chance	Raw	Raw	Female tag team
Natalya	Raw	Raw	Female wrestler
New Catch Republic (Pete Dunne and Tyler Bate)	SmackDown	Raw	Male tag team
Odyssey Jones	Raw	Raw	Male wrestler
Tegan Nox	Raw	SmackDown	Female wrestler

=== Wrestlers not included ===
The following wrestlers were not listed in either draft pool, mostly due to inactivity as a result of medical reasons.

Wrestler(s)	Pre-draft brand	Reason for omission (if any)	Subsequent status	Date	Role	Notes
The Rock	SmackDown	Inactive, due to outside commitments. Rock would return at RAW’s Netflix premiere in non-wrestling capacity.	Free agent	May 6, 2024	Part time male wrestler, Director of Operations	Last appeared on the RAW after WWE WrestleMania XL. Only making sporadic appearances following the draft.
Brock Lesnar	Free agent	Inactive, reportedly due to being referenced in the allegations against Vince McMahon and was directly named in an amended claim in January 2025.	Free agent	May 6, 2024	Male wrestler	Last appeared on August 5, 2023, at SummerSlam. Remained listed as a free agent following the draft. Returned at SummerSlam on August 3, 2025.
Omos and MVP	Free agents	Unknown	Free agents	May 6, 2024	Male wrestler and manager	Last appeared on the April 5, 2024, episode of SmackDown. Remained listed as free agents following the draft. MVP left WWE shortly after the draft and was signed by rival promotion All Elite Wrestling (AEW) in September 2024. Omos subsequently began performing in the Japanese promotion Pro Wrestling Noah in December 2024 but left in January 2025 to return to WWE.
Rhea Ripley	Raw	Inactive due to shoulder injury	Raw	May 6, 2024	Female wrestler	Last appeared on the April 15, 2024, episode of Raw. Remained listed on the Raw roster following the draft. Returned on the July 8, 2024, episode.
Sonya Deville	Raw	Inactive due to ACL injury	Raw	May 20, 2024	Female wrestler	Last appeared on the July 28, 2023, episode of SmackDown. Returned on the May 20, 2024, episode of Raw; however, her WWE contract expired in February 2025 and was not renewed. Now appears in Total Nonstop Action Wrestling (TNA) as Daria Rae.
Dexter Lumis	Raw	Unknown	Raw	June 17, 2024	Male wrestler	Last appeared on the June 1, 2023, episode of Main Event (taped on May 29). Returned on the June 17, 2024, episode of Raw.
Nikki Cross	Raw	Unknown	Raw	June 17, 2024	Female wrestler	Last appeared on the February 12, 2024, episode of Raw. Returned on the June 17, 2024, episode.
Bo Dallas/Uncle Howdy	SmackDown (Note: Uncle Howdy was also not included in the 2023 WWE Draft for the same reason, but SmackDown was his previous brand before then.)	Was originally inactive due to Bray Wyatt's absence, but took extended time off following Wyatt's death in August 2023.	Raw	June 17, 2024	Male wrestler	Last appeared on the March 3, 2023, episode of SmackDown. Returned on the June 17, 2024, episode of Raw, now portraying both Howdy and his original persona of Bo Dallas.
Roman Reigns	SmackDown	Originally included as part of The Bloodline in the Night 1 draft pool, but his special counsel Paul Heyman withdrew Reigns from eligibility prior to draft selections being made due to the turmoil within The Bloodline.	SmackDown	August 3, 2024	Male wrestler	Last appeared in the Night 2 main event of WrestleMania XL on April 7, 2024. Returned at SummerSlam on August 3, 2024.
Jimmy Uso	SmackDown	Inactive due to undisclosed injury	SmackDown	October 5, 2024	Male wrestler	Last appeared on the April 12, 2024, episode of SmackDown. Returned at Bad Blood on October 5, 2024.
Raquel Rodriguez	Raw	Inactive due to mast cell activation syndrome	Raw	October 5, 2024	Female wrestler	Last appeared on the February 26, 2024, episode of Raw. Returned at Bad Blood on October 5, 2024.
Erik	Raw	Inactive due to neck injury	Raw	October 7, 2024	Male wrestler	Last appeared on the September 14, 2023, episode of Main Event (taped on September 11). Returned with Ivar as the renamed War Raiders on the October 14, 2024, episode of Raw (taped on October 7).
Shotzi	SmackDown	Inactive due to ACL injury	NXT	December 10, 2024	Female wrestler	Last appeared on the February 20, 2024, episode of NXT (taped on February 13). Returned on the December 10 episode; however, she was released from WWE in May 2025.
Charlotte Flair	SmackDown	Inactive due to knee injury	SmackDown	February 1, 2025	Female wrestler	Last appeared on the December 8, 2023, episode of SmackDown. On the January 17, 2025, episode, Flair appeared in a vignette announcing that she would be returning to in-ring competition, and subsequently returned at the Royal Rumble on February 1.
Alexa Bliss	Raw (Note: Alexa Bliss was also not included in the 2023 WWE Draft for the same reason, but Raw was her previous brand before then.)	Inactive due to maternity leave	SmackDown	February 1, 2025	Female wrestler	Last appeared at the Royal Rumble on January 28, 2023. Returned at the Royal Rumble on February 1, 2025, and was subsequently assigned to SmackDown on February 7.
Carmella	Raw (Note: Carmella was also not included in the 2023 WWE Draft for the same reason, but Raw was her previous brand before then.)	Inactive due to maternity leave	Released	February 21, 2025	Female wrestler	Last appeared on March 31, 2023, for the WrestleMania 39 set reveal. Her WWE contract expired in February 2025 and was not renewed.
Valhalla	Raw	Inactive due to maternity leave	Released	June 2, 2025	Female wrestler	Last appeared on the March 4, 2024, episode of Raw. Her WWE contract expired in June 2025 and was not renewed.
Tamina	SmackDown	Unknown			Female wrestler	Last appeared on the March 2, 2023, episode of Main Event (taped on February 27). Removed from active roster in July 2024.
