= Jacy Jayne =

American professional wrestler (born 1996)

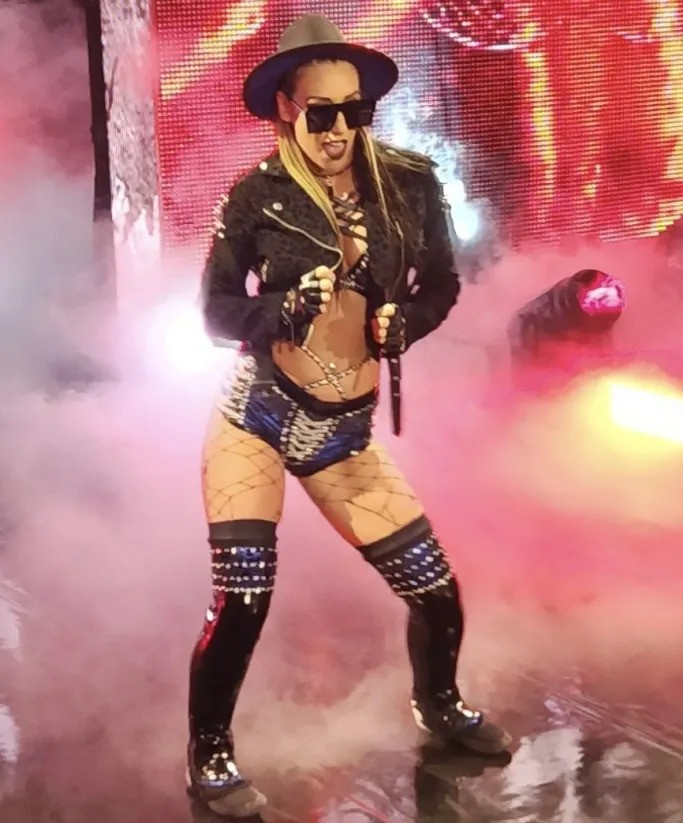
- Jayne in 2023

Personal information
- Born: Taylor Grado; June 2, 1996 (age 30) New Jersey, U.S.

Professional wrestling career
- Ring name(s): Avery Taylor; Jacy Jayne
- Billed height: 5 ft 6 in (168 cm)
- Billed weight: 114 lb (52 kg)
- Billed from: Jersey City, New Jersey
- Trained by: Jay Lethal; Matt Sydal; WWE Performance Center
- Debut: May 30, 2018

Taylor Grado (born June 2, 1996) is an American professional wrestler. As of August 2021, she is signed to WWE, where she performs on the SmackDown brand under the ring name Jacy Jayne, and is the leader of the Fatal Influence stable. She is the current WWE Women's United States Champion in her first reign.

Jayne is a former two-time NXT Women's Champion and record-tying two-time NXT Women's Tag Team Champion (with Gigi Dolin). She also made appearances in WWE's partner promotion Total Nonstop Action Wrestling (TNA), where she is a former one-time TNA Knockouts World Champion. Jayne is also the first woman to co-hold the NXT Women's Championship and the TNA Knockouts World Championshp.

== Professional wrestling career ==
=== Early career (2017–2021) ===
Grado began her professional wrestling training at World Wrestling Academy in New Port Richey, Florida in 2017. On May 30, 2018, under the ring name Avery Taylor, she made her debut in American Combat Wrestling (ACW). She went on to establish a career in the Florida wrestling promotions including ACW, Shine Wrestling, Evolve, and Full Impact Pro (FIP). Taylor became a two-time Women's Champion in ACW and a former one-time Women's Champion in World Xtreme Wrestling (WXW).

=== WWE ===
==== Toxic Attraction (2021–2023) ====
Prior to signing to WWE, she appeared on the September 23, 2020 episode of NXT, where she competed in a battle royal, which was won by Candice LeRae. On February 24, 2021, it was announced that Grado signed a developmental contract with WWE. She made her debut under the ring name Jacy Jayne on the July 20 episode of NXT, losing to Franky Monet.

On the debut episode of NXT 2.0 on September 14, Jayne and Gigi Dolin faced Kacy Catanzaro and Kayden Carter in a tag team match, which ended in no contest after Mandy Rose interfered, and they subsequently wrestled Catanzaro, Carter, and Sarray in a six-woman tag team match, in which Rose, Dolin, and Jayne emerged victorious. Jayne quickly joined the stable Toxic Attraction led by Rose, thus establishing herself as a heel. On the September 28 episode of NXT 2.0, Dolin and Jayne wrestled their first in-ring match in a NXT Women's Tag Team Championship match won by Io Shirai and Zoey Stark. At NXT: Halloween Havoc, Dolin and Jayne defeated Shirai and Stark and Indi Hartwell and Persia Pirotta in a Scareway to Hell Ladder triple threat tag team match for the NXT Women's Tag Team Championship, marking the first championship wins for both Dolin and Jayne in the company. On the November 16 episode of NXT 2.0, Toxi Attraction joined Dakota Kai in a WarGames match at NXT WarGames to face Raquel González, Kay Lee Ray, Cora Jade, and Io Shirai. At the event, Toxic Attraction and Kai lost the match.

At NXT: Vengeance Day, Dolin and Jayne retained their NXT Women's Tag Team Championship against Hartwell and Pirotta. At NXT Stand & Deliver, Dolin and Jayne lost the NXT Women's Tag Team Championship to Dakota Kai and Raquel González with the help of Wendy Choo, ending their reign at 158 days. They regained the titles with the help of Rose's distraction three days later. At NXT: The Great American Bash on July 5, 2022, Dolin and Jayne lost the NXT Women's Tag Team Championship to Cora Jade and Roxanne Perez. After the titles were vacated, Dolin and Jayne participated in a fatal four-way elimination match on the August 2 episode of NXT 2.0, where Dolin and Jayne were part of the final two teams in the match but eventually lost to Katana Chance and Kayden Carter. On the August 19 episode of SmackDown, Jayne made her main roster debut alongside Dolin as participants in the WWE Women's Tag Team Championship tournament. They would win the first match but were forced out of the tournament due to an injury suffered by Dolin. Dolin and Jayne made their return to SmackDown in a losing effort against new WWE Women's Tag Team Champions Aliyah and Raquel Rodriguez.

On December 14, Rose was released by WWE, thus turning Toxic Attraction into a tag team. At NXT: New Year's Evil on January 10, 2023, Dolin and Jayne were declared co-winners of a 20-woman battle royal after eliminating each other simultaneously to earn an NXT Women's Championship match against Roxanne Perez in a triple threat match at NXT Vengeance Day, where Perez successfully retained her title. On the February 7, 2023, edition of NXT, during a Ding Dong, Hello! segment hosted by Bayley, Jayne turned on Dolin, ending Toxic Attraction. Jayne faced Dolin at NXT: Roadblock on March 7 with Dolin winning the match. The former best friends went on to face each other again on May 2, where Jayne pinned Dolin. Their feud finally culminated on the May 30 episode of NXT, where Dolin defeated Jayne in a Weaponized Steel Cage match.

==== Chase University (2023–2024) ====
On the August 15 episode of NXT, Jayne defeated Chase University's Thea Hail after Hail was distracted by her stablemates Andre Chase and Duke Hudson. Backstage after the match, Jayne gave praise to Hail and subsequently became a mentor to Hail, turning face for the first time since 2021, with Jayne eventually joining Chase University. At Night 2 of NXT: Halloween Havoc, Hail and Jayne failed to win WWE Women's Tag Team Championship from Chelsea Green and Piper Niven after Chase refused to allow Jayne to use the title belt against Green. After helping with a storyline money problem, Chase thanked Jayne and officially accepted her into the stable. Around the same time, Jayne took on a new protégé, Jazmyn Nyx, who would help Jayne win matches by cheating which Hail refused to do. On the March 12 edition of NXT, after Hail and Fallon Henley lost a tag team match with Jayne refusing to be her partner the previous week, an emotional Hail disavowed her friendship with Jayne and declaring she was returning to the "old Thea Hail".

On the following week of NXT, Jayne (with Nyx) turned on Chase University and cost Riley Osborne the NXT Heritage Cup Championship match against No Quarter Catch Crew's Drew Gulak, turning both women heel in the process. On April 2, a six-woman tag team match was made official for NXT Stand & Deliver with Jayne, Kiana James and Izzi Dame facing Hail, Henley and Kelani Jordan where Jayne's team lost the match. On the April 16 episode of NXT, Jayne and Nyx assisted Tatum Paxley in defeating Hail. A match between Jayne and Hail was then made official for Week 2 of Spring Breakin' on April 30 where Jayne lost, ending their feud. Jayne suffered a legitimate broken nose during the match and had to undergo surgery. She made her return on the June 4 episode of NXT sporting a face mask for her broken nose.

==== Fatal Influence (2024–present) ====
On the July 9 episode of NXT, Jayne and Nyx formed an alliance with Fallon Henley, who took issue with wrestlers with no independent backgrounds getting more opportunities in NXT (Nyx was given an exception by Jayne and Henley despite having never competed in the independent circuit herself) and eventually calling themselves Fatal Influence. The trio teamed up for the first time at Week 1 of NXT: The Great American Bash on July 30, where they defeated Karmen Petrovic, Lola Vice, and Sol Ruca in a 6-woman tag team match. Beginning in September, Fatal Influence set their sights on the NXT Women's North American Championship held by Kelani Jordan. At NXT Halloween Havoc on October 27, Jordan faced Fatal Influence in a gauntlet match for the NXT Women's North American Championship. Nyx and Jayne were the first and second person in the gauntlet respectively and assisted Henley to defeat Jordan to win the title. Fatal Influence would soon after begin feuding with Tatum Paxley, Shotzi, and Jayne's former tag team partner and friend Gigi Dolin, with the two teams facing each other at NXT: New Year's Evil in a six-woman tag team match with Fatal Influence coming out on the losing end.

Over the next few months, there were signs of dissension within Fatal Influence, particularly between Jayne and Henley. On the May 27 episode of NXT, Jayne defeated Stephanie Vaquer to win the NXT Women's Championship. Jayne made her first successful title defense on the June 10 episode of NXT against Lainey Reid. On September 27 at No Mercy, Jayne retained the title against Vice, after an assist from Reid whom would later replace Nyx in Fatal Influence. At NXT Halloween Havoc on October 25, Jayne lost the title to Tatum Paxley, ending her first reign at 151 days. At Gold Rush on November 18, Jayne defeated Paxley to regain the title after Izzi Dame turned on Paxley. On January 31, 2026 at Royal Rumble, Jayne made her women's Royal Rumble match debut as the 24th entrant, eliminating Kelani Jordan before being eliminated by Ruca. At NXT Stand & Deliver, Jayne lost the title to Vice in a triple threat match also involving Kendal Grey, ending her second reign at 137 days. At NXT: Revenge Night 1 on April 14, Jayne failed to regain the title from Vice despite assistance from Henley and Reid in what would be her final match in NXT.

On the April 24, 2026 episode of SmackDown, Fatal Influence officially moved to the SmackDown brand, interrupting a title match between Alexa Bliss and Charlotte Flair against WWE Women's Tag Team Champions Brie Bella and Paige. Later that night, Jayne lost to WWE Women's Champion Rhea Ripley by disqualification after Henley and Reid attacked Ripley during the match. At Night 1 of SummerSlam on August 1, Fatal Influence defeated the team of The Bella Twins (Brie Bella and Nikki Bella) and Paige in a Six-Woman Tag Team Match. On the August 14 episode of SmackDown, Jayne defeated Tiffany Stratton to win the Women's United States Championship for the first time in her career. On the August 28 episode of SmackDown, Jayne defeated Paige to retain the title in her first title defense. On the September 18 episode of SmackDown, Jayne defeated Bliss and Jade Cargill to qualify for the Women's Money in the Bank ladder match. At the event on October 10, Jayne failed to win the match as it was won by Stratton. In November, Fatal Influence allied with Cargill and Michin (with B-Fab) as they face Flair, Bliss, Paxley, Bayley, and Stephanie Vaquer in a WarGames match at Survivor Series: WarGames on November 28. This will be Jayne's second WarGames match.

=== Total Nonstop Action Wrestling (2025) ===
On the March 20, 2025, episode of Impact!, Grado, as Jacy Jayne, made her unannounced Total Nonstop Action Wrestling (TNA) debut by attacking TNA Knockouts World Champion Masha Slamovich from behind. On Impact! the following week, Jayne made her TNA in-ring debut, facing Slamovich in a losing effort. At Slammiversary on July 20, Jayne defeated Slamovich in a Winner Takes All match to retain her NXT Women's Championship and also become the TNA Knockouts World Champion, becoming a double champion and the first wrestler to hold championships in both WWE and TNA simultaneously. At Heatwave, Jacy lost the TNA Knockouts World Championship to Ash by Elegance in a triple threat match also involving Slamovich, whom Elegance pinned, after interference from The Elegance Brand, ending her reign at 36 days.

== Other media ==
Grado, as Jacy Jayne, made her video game debut as a playable character in WWE 2K23, and has since appeared in WWE 2K24, WWE 2K25, and WWE 2K26.

== Personal life ==
Grado is a self described animal lover and resides at home with 3 dogs and 1 cat.

== Championships and accomplishments ==
- American Combat Wrestling
  - ACW Women's Championship (2 times)
  - ACW Women's Title #1 Contendership Tournament (2018)
- Pro Wrestling Illustrated
  - Ranked No. 49 of the top 150 female singles wrestlers in the PWI Women's 150 in 2022
  - Ranked No. 14 of the top 100 Tag Teams in the PWI Tag Team 100 in 2022 – with Toxic Attraction
  - Ranked No. 11 of the top 250 women's wrestlers in the PWI Women's 250 in 2025
- Total Nonstop Action Wrestling
  - TNA Knockouts World Championship (1 time)
- World Xtreme Wrestling
  - WXW Women's Championship (1 time)
- WWE
  - WWE Women's United States Championship (1 time, current)
  - NXT Women's Championship (2 times)
  - NXT Women's Tag Team Championship (2 times) – with Gigi Dolin
