= NXT Women's Tag Team Championship =

Former WWE professional wrestling championship

- The NXT Women's Tag Team Championship belt with default side plates

Details
- Promotion: WWE
- Date established: March 10, 2021
- Date retired: June 23, 2023 (unified with the WWE Women's Tag Team Championship)
Statistics
- First champions: Dakota Kai and Raquel González
- Final champion: Alba Fyre and Isla Dawn
- Most reigns: As tag team (2 reigns): Dakota Kai and Raquel González; Toxic Attraction (Gigi Dolin and Jacy Jayne); As individual (2 reigns): Dakota Kai; Gigi Dolin; Jacy Jayne; Raquel González
- Longest reign: Katana Chance and Kayden Carter (186 days)
- Shortest reign: Dakota Kai and Raquel González (1st reign, 56 minutes)
- Oldest champion: Candice LeRae (35 years, 224 days)
- Youngest champion: Roxanne Perez (20 years, 242 days)
- Heaviest champion: Dakota Kai and Raquel González (296 lb (134 kg) combined)
- Lightest champion: Katana Chance and Kayden Carter (210 lb (95 kg) combined)

The NXT Women's Tag Team Championship was a professional wrestling women's tag team championship created and promoted by the American promotion WWE. It was defended on the company's developmental brand, NXT, and was briefly featured on the main roster brand, SmackDown, before its retirement. The championship was established on March 10, 2021, and the team of Dakota Kai and Raquel González were the inaugural champions. On the June 23, 2023, episode of SmackDown, the title was unified into the WWE Women's Tag Team Championship, officially retiring the title in the process, with Alba Fyre and Isla Dawn recognized as the final champions.

The championship was created as a result of a controversial finish to a WWE Women's Tag Team Championship match. After the team of Dakota Kai and Raquel González won the first-ever Women's Dusty Rhodes Tag Team Classic, they received a match for the WWE Women's Tag Team Championship, which at the time was available to NXT, but they did not win the title due to the controversial finish in which Kai was submitted although she was not the legal woman. The NXT Women's Tag Team Championship was then created and awarded to Kai and González due to the controversy and for winning the Dusty Classic. At the time the title was introduced, NXT was regarded as WWE's "third brand". In September 2021, however, NXT reverted to its original function as WWE's developmental brand.

== History ==
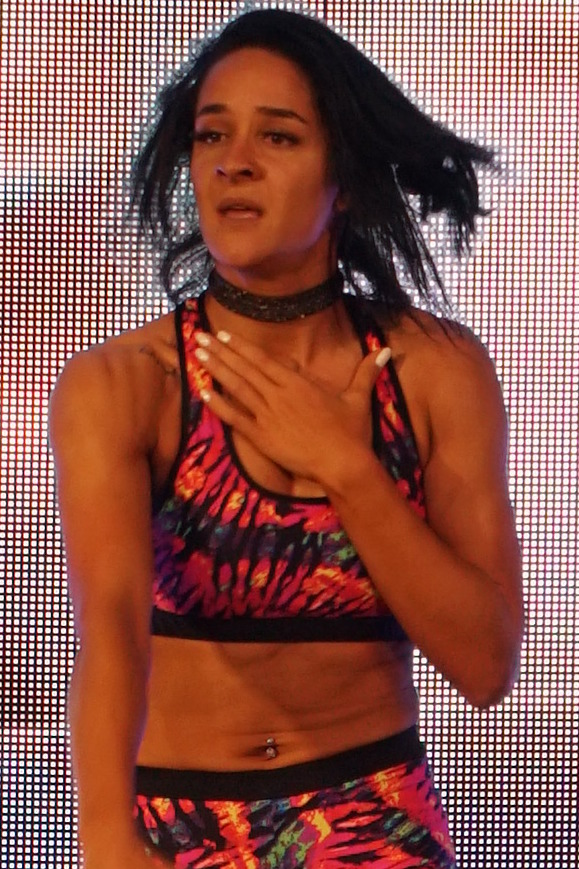
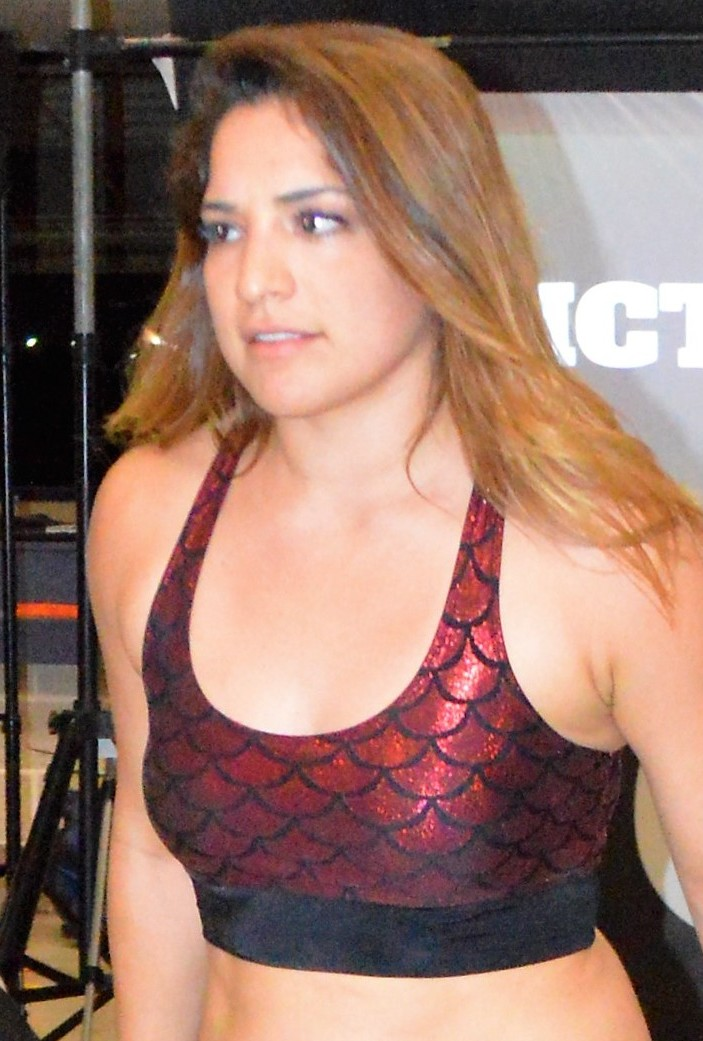
Inaugural and record-tying two-time champions Dakota Kai and Raquel González

In December 2018, the WWE Women's Tag Team Championship was established as the sole women's tag team championship for WWE, shared across the Raw, SmackDown, and NXT brands, and the inaugural champions were crowned in February 2019. Two years later, on the March 3, 2021, episode of NXT, Dakota Kai and Raquel González, who had earned a title opportunity for winning the first-ever Women's Dusty Rhodes Tag Team Classic, faced reigning WWE Women's Tag Team Champions Nia Jax and Shayna Baszler (whose home brand was Raw). After the referee had been knocked out during the match, Adam Pearce, who was the WWE official of Raw and SmackDown at the time, sent down a second referee to declare Kai had submitted to Baszler, although Kai was not the legal woman. This led to a backstage argument between Pearce and then-NXT General Manager William Regal.

The following week on the March 10 episode, Regal introduced the NXT Women's Tag Team Championship and awarded the titles to Kai and González due to winning the Dusty Classic; the WWE Women's Tag Team Championship subsequently became no longer available to NXT. Their reign would not last long, as that same night, they defended the titles against the runner ups of the tournament, Ember Moon and Shotzi Blackheart, who defeated Kai and González to win the championship.

As a result of the 2023 WWE Draft, reigning NXT Women's Tag Team Champions Alba Fyre and Isla Dawn were drafted to SmackDown and took the titles with them, claiming they would defend the title across all three brands, although they never did and only had non-title matches on SmackDown. On the June 9 episode, as they were about to have an in-ring interview, Fyre and Dawn were interrupted by reigning WWE Women's Tag Team Champions Ronda Rousey and Shayna Baszler, who challenged Fyre and Dawn to a championship unification match, which was accepted and scheduled for the June 23 episode of SmackDown. Rousey and Baszler won to become the undisputed WWE Women's Tag Team Champions, thus making the WWE Women's Tag Team Championship available to NXT again. The NXT Women's Tag Team Championship was subsequently retired in the process, with Dawn and Fyre recognized as the final champions.

According to Fightful, the unification match was planned to happen right after the draft, but due to various injuries within the division, it got delayed. Fightful also noted there had been confusion regarding the original creation of the NXT Women's Tag Team Championship, as the company already had the WWE Women's Tag Team Championship and there were not many women's tag teams in the division. Furthermore, it was noted that the plan after the unification was that the WWE Women's Tag Team Championship would appear on NXT programming "when needed", which was the original plan for the title.

== Belt design ==
The belt design of the NXT Women's Tag Team Championship was nearly identical to the men's NXT Tag Team Championship, with a few exceptions. The straps were smaller for the women and they were white instead of black. Above the vertical NXT logo on the center plate said "Women's Tag Team" instead of just "Tag Team". For the customizable side plates, the default side plates had the vertical NXT logo instead of the WWE logo. The WWE logo was also missing from the very center of the NXT logo on the center plate.

== Reigns ==
Over the championship's two-year history, there were 11 reigns between nine teams composed of 18 individual champions and one vacancy. The inaugural championship team was Dakota Kai and Raquel González and they tied Toxic Attraction (Gigi Dolin and Jacy Jayne) for the most reigns at two, both as a team and individually. Toxic Attraction also had the longest combined reign at 249 days (247 as recognized by WWE). The team of Katana Chance and Kayden Carter had the longest singular reign at 186 days, while Kai and González's first reign was the shortest at 56 minutes (being named as first champions then losing the title later the same night). Candice LeRae was the oldest champion at 35 years old, while Roxanne Perez was the youngest, winning the title at 20. The final champions were the team of Alba Fyre and Isla Dawn.

Key
No.	Overall reign number
Reign	Reign number for the specific team—reign numbers for the individuals are in parentheses, if different
Days	Number of days held
Days recog.	Number of days held recognized by the promotion
<1	Reign lasted less than a day

No.	Champion	Championship change			Reign statistics			Notes	Ref.
No.	Champion	Date	Event	Location	Reign	Days	Days recog.	Notes	Ref.
WWE: NXT
1	Dakota Kai and Raquel González	March 10, 2021	NXT	Orlando, FL	1	<1	<1	NXT General Manager William Regal awarded the titles to the Women's Dusty Rhodes Tag Team Classic winners Kai and González after a screwjob finish to their WWE Women's Tag Team Championship match against Nia Jax and Shayna Baszler the week prior.	
2	Ember Moon and Shotzi Blackheart	March 10, 2021	NXT	Orlando, FL	1	55	55		
3	The Way (Candice LeRae and Indi Hartwell)	May 4, 2021	NXT	Orlando, FL	1	63	62	This was a Street Fight match.	
4	Io Shirai and Zoey Stark	July 6, 2021	NXT: The Great American Bash	Orlando, FL	1	112	111		
5	Toxic Attraction (Gigi Dolin and Jacy Jayne)	October 26, 2021	NXT 2.0: Halloween Havoc	Orlando, FL	1	158	157	This was a Spin the Wheel, Make the Deal: Triple threat tag team Scareway to Hell Ladder match also involving the team of Indi Hartwell and Persia Pirotta.	
6	Dakota Kai and Raquel González	April 2, 2022	Stand & Deliver; Kickoff	Dallas, TX	2	3	3		
7	Toxic Attraction (Gigi Dolin and Jacy Jayne)	April 5, 2022	NXT 2.0	Orlando, FL	2	91	90		
8	Cora Jade and Roxanne Perez	July 5, 2022	NXT 2.0: The Great American Bash	Orlando, FL	1	14	14		
8	Roxanne Perez	July 19, 2022	NXT 2.0	Orlando, FL	—	7	7	On the July 12, 2022, episode of NXT 2.0, Cora Jade turned on Perez. The following week, Jade threw her championship belt in a trashcan, vacating her half of the championship. WWE.com lists this as a separate entry on the official title history, but it is unclear if WWE views this as an official second reign for Perez or just a continuation from her reign with Jade.	
—	Vacated	July 26, 2022	NXT 2.0	Orlando, FL	—	—	—	Roxanne Perez vacated the other half of the championship due to not having a tag team partner.	
9	Katana Chance and Kayden Carter	August 2, 2022	NXT 2.0	Orlando, FL	1	186	186	Defeated the teams of Ivy Nile and Tatum Paxley, Toxic Attraction (Gigi Dolin and Jacy Jayne), and Yulisa Leon and Valentina Feroz in a fatal four-way tag team elimination match to win the vacant title.	
10	Fallon Henley and Kiana James	February 4, 2023	Vengeance Day	Charlotte, NC	1	56	55		
11	Alba Fyre and Isla Dawn	April 1, 2023	Stand & Deliver	Los Angeles, CA	1	83	83	As a result of the 2023 WWE Draft, Fyre and Dawn were drafted to SmackDown, although the title remained on NXT.	
—	Unified	June 23, 2023	SmackDown	Lafayette, LA	—	—	—	Ronda Rousey and Shayna Baszler defeated Alba Fyre and Isla Dawn to unify the NXT Women's Tag Team Championship into the WWE Women's Tag Team Championship. The NXT Women's Tag Team Championship was retired with Fyre and Dawn recognized as the final champions.	

== Combined reigns ==
=== By team ===
Rank	Team	No. of reigns	Combined days	Combined days rec. by WWE
1	Toxic Attraction (Gigi Dolin and Jacy Jayne)	2	249	247
2	Katana Chance and Kayden Carter	1	186	
3	Io Shirai and Zoey Stark	1	112	111
4	Alba Fyre and Isla Dawn	1	83	
5	The Way (Candice LeRae and Indi Hartwell)	1	63	62
6	Fallon Henley and Kiana James	1	56	55
7	Ember Moon and Shotzi Blackheart	1	55	
8	Cora Jade and Roxanne Perez	1	14	
9	Dakota Kai and Raquel González	2	3	

=== By wrestler ===
Rank	Wrestler	No. of reigns	Combined days	Combined days rec. by WWE
1	Gigi Dolin	2	249	247
1	Jacy Jayne	2	249	247
3	Katana Chance	1	186	
3	Kayden Carter	1	186	
5	Io Shirai	1	112	111
5	Zoey Stark	1	112	111
7	Alba Fyre	1	83	
7	Isla Dawn	1	83	
9	Candice LeRae	1	63	62
9	Indi Hartwell	1	63	62
11	Fallon Henley	1	56	55
11	Kiana James	1	56	55
13	Ember Moon	1	55	
13	Shotzi Blackheart	1	55	
15	Roxanne Perez	1	21	
16	Cora Jade	1	14	
17	Dakota Kai	2	3	
17	Raquel González	2	3	

== See also ==
- Tag team championships in WWE
- Women's championships in WWE
