= Kiana James =

American professional wrestler (born 1997)

Personal information
- Born: Kayla Inlay; May 23, 1997 (age 29) Sioux City, Iowa, U.S.
- Education: Morningside University
- Spouse: Zach Klingensmith (m. 2022)

Professional wrestling career
- Ring name(s): Kayla Inlay; Kiana James; Xtina Kay
- Billed from: Sioux City, Iowa
- Trained by: Shawn Spears; Tyler Breeze; WWE Performance Center; Sara Amato
- Debut: September 11, 2021

Kayla Klingensmith (née Inlay; born May 23, 1997) is an American professional wrestler. She is signed to WWE, where she performs on the SmackDown brand under the ring name Kiana James, and in WWE's sister promotion Lucha Libre AAA Worldwide (AAA). She is a former one-time NXT Women's Tag Team Champion (with Fallon Henley).

== Early life ==
Kayla Inlay was born on May 23, 1997 in Sioux City, Iowa. She completed her secondary education at East High School and later graduated from Morningside University in 2019 with a degree in science.

== Professional wrestling career ==
=== Early career (2021–2022) ===
Inlay trained to become a professional wrestler at the Flatbacks Wrestling School in Apopka, Florida under Shawn Spears and Tyler Breeze. On the September 21, 2021 episode of AEW Dark (taped on September 11), she made her in-ring debut under the ring name Xtina Kay, losing to The Bunny.

=== WWE (2022–present) ===
==== NXT (2022–2024) ====
Inlay made her WWE debut under her real name on the February 1, 2022 episode of NXT, losing to Sarray. Inlay was repackaged as Kiana James and took on a heel businesswoman gimmick, debuting in the NXT Women's Breakout Tournament on May 17, losing to Roxanne Perez in the first round. James would have her first televised win on the June 24 episode of NXT Level Up by defeating Brooklyn Barlow. On the July 19 episode of NXT, James competed in a 20-woman battle royal to determine the number one contender for the NXT Women's Championship, eliminating Fallon Henley but was eliminated by Nikkita Lyons. James then feuded with Lyons after insulting her looks but lost to her on the August 9 episode of NXT and in a tag match alongside Arianna Grace against Lyons and Zoey Stark on the September 13 episode of NXT. James would have a short feud with Dana Brooke on Main Event, defeating her on November 3. James would start a feud against Henley with whom she would bet her parents' bar against the offer that James offered her. On the November 29 episode of NXT, James defeated Henley. At NXT Deadline, James competed in the Women's Iron Survivor Challenge to determine the number one contender to Mandy Rose's NXT Women's Championship, which was won by Perez. On the December 27 episode of NXT, James ended her feud with Henley after losing to her in a Battle for the Bar.

At NXT: New Year's Evil on January 10, 2023, James competed in a 20-woman battle royal to determine the number one contender to Roxanne Perez's NXT Women's Championship, being eliminated by Lyra Valkyria. On February 5, at NXT Vengeance Day, James and Fallon Henley defeated Katana Chance and Kayden Carter to win the NXT Women's Tag Team Championship, making it the first title in James' career, and turning face in the process. On April 1, at NXT Stand & Deliver, James and Henley lost the tag titles to Alba Fyre and Isla Dawn. On the April 25 episode of NXT, After James and Jensen were defeated by Josh Briggs and Fallon Henley, James walked out on Jensen causing Jensen to go back to Briggs and Henley, thus reverting James back to a heel. On the May 9 episode of NXT, in the first round of the tournament for the vacated NXT Women's Championship, James was eliminated by Lyra Valkyria. James would then succeed in winning a fatal four-way number one contender's match for the title on the August 29 episode of NXT. The following week, she would be defeated by champion Tiffany Stratton.

Onward, she would begin a short rivalry with new NXT Women's Champion Becky Lynch, even as so far as to aid Tiffany Stratton in their attacks. They eventually lost to Lynch and Lyra Valkyria in a tag team match on the September 19 episode of NXT. She then started a feud with Roxanne Perez, after attacking her when she lost to Asuka on the October 10 episode of NXT, only for Shotzi to emerge from commentary and fend off James. The following week, James lost to Shotzi. That same night, Perez challenged James to a Spin the Wheel, Make the Deal Devil's Playground match on Night 1 of NXT: Halloween Havoc, in which Perez was victorious. On the November 14 episode of NXT, James interfered in Perez's qualifying match for the Women's Iron Survivor Challenge at NXT Deadline, helping Lash Legend gain the victory. Two weeks later, James lost her qualifying match against Kelani Jordan, with Perez causing the distraction. At NXT Deadline on December 9, James defeated Perez in a Steel Cage match, with assistance from Izzi Dame. At NXT Stand & Deliver on April 6, 2024, James and Dame teamed up with Jacy Jayne in her feud against Chase University's Thea Hail, who teamed up with Fallon Henley and Kelani Jordan, where the latter team won in a six-woman tag team match. On the following episode of NXT, James and Dame defeated Henley and Jordan in a tag team match in James' final match for NXT.

==== Main roster (2024–present) ====
At the Night 1 of the WWE Draft on the April 26, 2024 episode of SmackDown, James was drafted to the Raw brand. On the June 3 episode of Raw, James defeated Natalya in her main roster debut match. On the June 17 episode of Raw, James competed in a triple threat money in the bank qualifying match which was won by Iyo Sky. It was later revealed that James had suffered a leg injury and would be out of action for over a year. James returned from injury on the July 18, 2025 episode of Main Event, where she lost to Michin. She would make her SmackDown debut on the July 25 episode of SmackDown, revealing that she would represent Women's United States Champion Giulia, thus moving over to the SmackDown brand. On January 31, 2026 at Royal Rumble, James made her women's Royal Rumble match debut as the third entrant, lasting 27 minutes before being eliminated by Raquel Rodriguez. On the February 6 episode of SmackDown, James and Giulia faced WWE Women's Tag Team Champions Rhiyo (Rhea Ripley and Iyo Sky) for the titles but lost the match. On February 20 episode of SmackDown, James defeated Charlotte Flair and Nia Jax to qualify for the Elimination Chamber on February 28. At the event, James failed to win the match after being eliminated by Raquel Rodriguez. Her alliance with Giulia ended when James blamed her for James' failure to advance to the semifinals of the Queen of the Ring tournament on the June 5 episode of SmackDown, prompting Giulia to retaliate against her former ally.

=== Lucha Libre AAA Worldwide (2026–present) ===
On the November 21, 2026 episode of Lucha Libre AAA, a vignette of James was aired teasing her debut to the promotion.

== Championships and accomplishments ==
- WWE
  - NXT Women's Tag Team Championship (1 time) – with Fallon Henley
- Pro Wrestling Illustrated
  - Ranked No. 166 of the top 250 female singles wrestlers in the PWI Women's 250 in 2023
