= Zoey Stark =

American professional wrestler (born 1994)

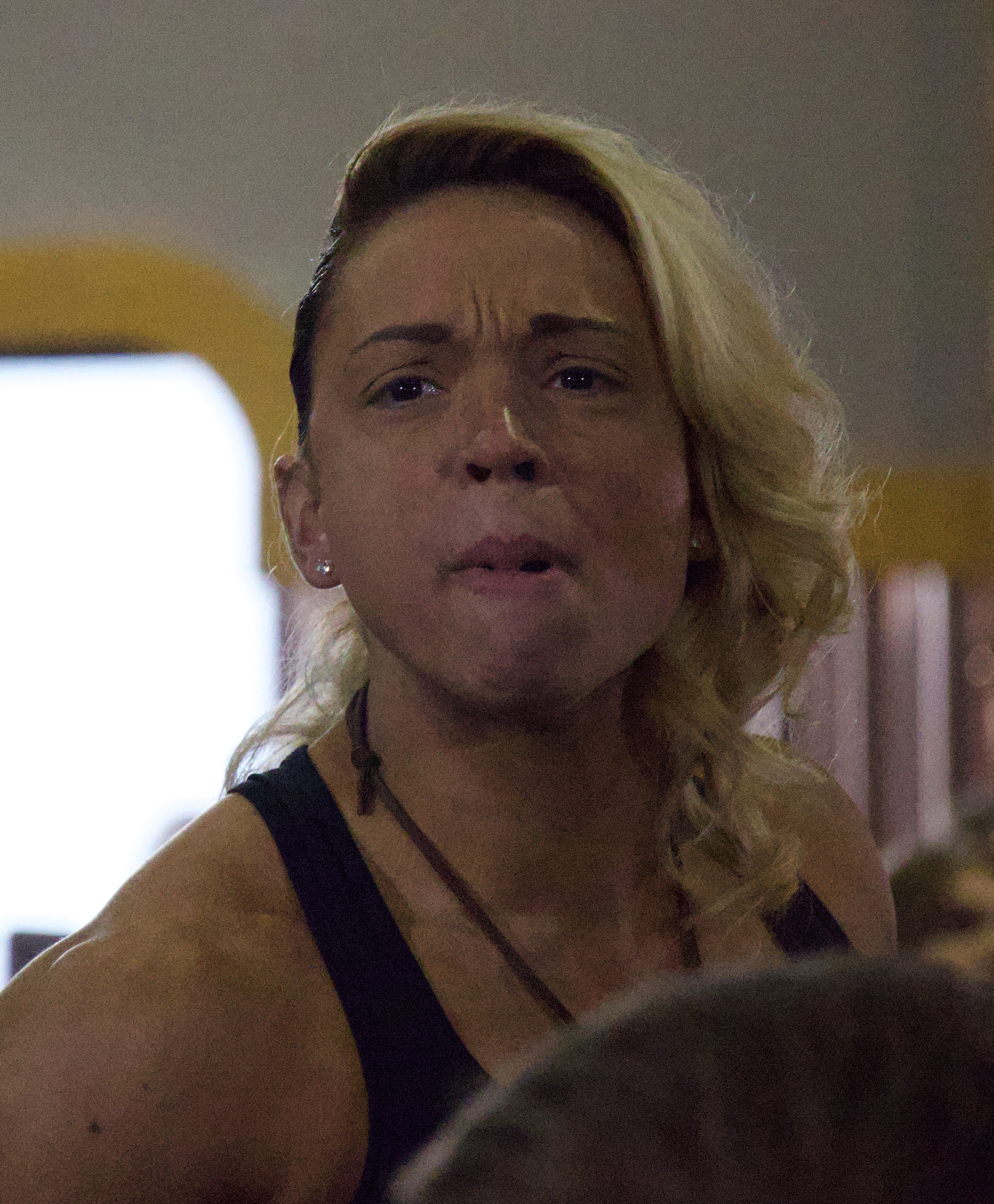
- Stark in 2024

Personal information
- Born: Theresa Serrano; January 25, 1994 (age 32) Salt Lake City, Utah, U.S.

Professional wrestling career
- Ring name(s): Lacey Ryan; Serrano; Zoey Serrano; Zoey Stark
- Billed height: 5 ft 7 in (170 cm)
- Billed from: Las Vegas, Nevada
- Trained by: Allison Danger; Cheerleader Melissa; Tom Howard; D'Lo Brown; Derrick Hubbard; Sinn Bodhi; WWE Performance Center
- Debut: 2013

Theresa Serrano (born January 25, 1994) is an American professional wrestler. As of August 2026, she is signed to Total Nonstop Action Wrestling (TNA), where she performs under the ring name Zoey Serrano, and is one-half of the tag team Apex, holding the TNA Knockouts World Tag Team Champions alongside Shayna Baszler. She is best known for her tenure in WWE, where she performed under the ring name Zoey Stark. She is a former NXT Women's Tag Team Champion.

== Early life ==
Theresa Serrano was born on January 25, 1994, in Salt Lake City. She and her family frequently moved before settling in San Bernardino, California.

== Professional wrestling career ==
=== Independent circuit (2013–2021) ===
Serrano began her professional wrestling career on the independent circuit in 2013. She made her debut for Ultra Championship Wrestling-Zero (UCW-Zero) on November 16 under the ring name Lacey Ryan, defeating Larry Butabi. During her tenure with UCW-Zero, she won the UCW-Zero Ultra-X Championship twice, losing the title the first time to The Durango Kid on January 25, 2014. She regained the title on May 10 and held it until she lost to Manny Fresh on August 2. Ryan did not wrestle for four years until returning on August 16, 2018, when she fought Thunder Rosa to a no contest at a Dallas Championship Wrestling (DCW) show.

On September 29, 2019, Ryan defeated Taya Valkyrie to win the Future Stars of Wrestling (FSW) Women's Championship. During this time, Ryan began wrestling for Championship Wrestling from Hollywood (CWFH), where she feuded with Heather Monroe. She successfully defended the title against Mazzerati on November 15. On October 11, 2020, she appeared for Shimmer Women Athletes at Volume 118, defeating Davienne. On November 10, she retained the title against Vipress on an episode of United Wrestling Network's (UWN) Primetime Live. Ten days later, Ryan lost the FSW Women's Championship to Mazzerati. Her last appearance on the independent circuit was on December 11 for Mission Pro Wrestling (MPW), where she lost to La Rosa Negra in a two-out-of-three falls match for the vacant MPW Championship.

=== Impact Wrestling (2020) ===
Serrano, as Lacey Ryan, appeared for Impact Wrestling on the March 11, 2020 episode of Impact!, after confronting Kiera Hogan the previous week, challenging Jordynne Grace for the TNA Knockouts World Championship in a losing effort. She subsequently lost to Hogan on the following episode of Impact!.

=== WWE (2021–2026) ===
==== NXT (2021–2023) ====
Prior to signing with the company, Serrano participated in a WWE tryout in November 2020. On January 20, 2021, it was reported that Serrano had signed a contract with WWE and was given the new ring name Zoey Stark. She made her debut as Marina Shafir's tag team partner in the Women's Dusty Rhodes Tag Team Classic tournament on the January 29 episode of 205 Live, losing to Ember Moon and Shotzi in the first round. The following month, she reported to the WWE Performance Center. On the February 17 episode of NXT, she made her NXT debut as a face, defeating Valentina Feroz.

The following week on NXT, Stark lost to NXT Women's Champion Io Shirai in a non-title match. On Night 1 of NXT TakeOver: Stand & Deliver on April 7, she defeated Toni Storm on the pre-show. In June, Stark allied with Shirai as a tag team, winning a triple threat match to become the number one contenders for the NXT Women's Tag Team Championship. At The Great American Bash on July 6, Stark and Shirai defeated The Way (Candice LeRae and Indi Hartwell) to win the titles. They successfully defended the titles against Kacy Catanzaro and Kayden Carter and Toxic Attraction (Gigi Dolin and Jacy Jayne) on the September 7 and 28 episodes of NXT, before losing them to Toxic Attraction at Halloween Havoc on October 26 in a triple threat tag team "Scareway to Hell" ladder match, also involving Hartwell and Persia Pirotta. On the November 2 episode of NXT, Stark was attacked backstage by Jayne and Dolin. This was used to write her off television as she suffered a legitimate knee injury (a torn ACL and meniscus) which required surgery. During her time off, she worked as a producer.

On the July 19, 2022 episode of NXT, Stark returned from injury, winning a 20-woman battle royal to become the number one contender for the NXT Women's Championship. However, she failed to win the title from Mandy Rose at Heatwave on August 16. On the November 8 episode of NXT, Stark and Nikkita Lyons failed to win the NXT Women's Tag Team Championship from Kayden Carter and Katana Chance. After the match, Stark attacked Lyons, turning heel for the first time in her WWE career. At NXT Deadline on December 10, she competed in the women's Iron Survivor Challenge, which was won by Roxanne Perez. On January 28, 2023, at the Royal Rumble pay-per-view, Stark entered her first Royal Rumble match at number 13, lasting 26:34 before she was eliminated by Sonya Deville. At NXT Stand & Deliver on April 1, she competed in a ladder match for the NXT Women's Championship, which was won by Hartwell. Stark wrestled her final NXT match on the April 18 episode of NXT, losing to Perez.

==== Raw (2023–2026) ====
As part of the 2023 WWE Draft, Stark was drafted to the Raw brand. On the May 8 episode of Raw, Stark made her main roster debut, defeating Nikki Cross. At Night of Champions on May 27, Stark assisted Trish Stratus in defeating Becky Lynch, aligning with Stratus in the process. On the June 5 episode of Raw, Stark defeated Natalya to qualify for the women's Money in the Bank ladder match at Money in the Bank on July 1. She and Stratus teamed throughout the match to prevent Lynch from winning, including a failed attempt to restrain Lynch with handcuffs; the match was won by Iyo Sky. Stark wrestled her first main event match on the main roster against Lynch in a falls count anywhere match on the August 28 episode of Raw. Stark accidentally struck Stratus through a table, which allowed Lynch to put Stark through another table to win the match. At Payback on September 2, Stark unsuccessfully aided Stratus in the latter's steel cage match against Lynch. Stark then ended her alliance with Stratus when Stratus slapped and berated her after the match, prompting Stark to attack Stratus in retaliation.

Two nights later on Raw, Stark lost to Shayna Baszler by technical submission, after fainting to Baszler's Kirifuda Clutch. After the match, Baszler gave praise to Stark's toughness. The next week, Stark ran out to save Baszler from an attack by Chelsea Green and Piper Niven after Baszler's match with Green. On the September 18 episode of Raw, Stark and Baszler teamed up for the first time, facing Green and Niven; the match ended in a no contest after interference from Nia Jax. At Crown Jewel on November 4, Stark failed to win the Women's World Championship from Rhea Ripley in a fatal-five way match, also involving Raquel Rodriguez, Jax and Baszler, who Ripley pinned to retain the title. On the following episode of Raw, Stark won a battle royal for a Women's World Championship match against Ripley at Survivor Series: WarGames on November 25, which she lost. In May 2024, Stark competed in the Queen of the Ring tournament, where she lost to Lyra Valkyria in the quarterfinals. At Clash at the Castle on June 14, she and Baszler competed in a triple threat match for the WWE Women's Tag Team Championship, which was won by The Unholy Union (Alba Fyre and Isla Dawn). At Money in the Bank on July 6, Stark competed in the namesake ladder match, which was won by Tiffany Stratton.

On the July 8 episode of Raw, Stark and Baszler aligned themselves with the returning Sonya Deville, after weeks of declining the latter's offer, calling themselves Pure Fusion Collective (P.F.C.). In December, Stark entered the tournament to crown the inaugural Women's Intercontinental Champion, where she lost to Dakota Kai in the semifinals. At Royal Rumble on February 1, 2025, Stark entered the match at number 8, where she helped Baszler and Deville eliminate Maxxine Dupri, before being eliminated by Bianca Belair and Naomi. Six days later, Deville's contract was not renewed by WWE, relegating P.F.C. to a tag team consisting of only Stark and Baszler. On May 2, Baszler was released by WWE, effectively ending P.F.C.

On the May 19 episode of Raw, Stark faced Ripley and Kairi Sane in a triple threat Money in the Bank qualifying match in what would be her final match in WWE. During the match, as Stark attempted a missile dropkick from the top rope, she landed awkwardly on her right knee. Stark was removed from the match immediately, and she later confirmed she had torn her ACL, MCL, and meniscus in a social media post. On April 24, 2026, Stark was released from WWE, ending her five-year tenure with the promotion.

=== Return to independent circuit (2026–present) ===
Serrano made her return to the independent scene as Zoey Serrano, on July 25, 2026 for Revolution Pro Wrestling (RevPro). Serrano competed in the Women’s Grand Prix, where she was eliminated by Zeuxis in the first round. The following day, Serrano reunited with former tag team partner Shayna Baszler to defeat Kanji and Myla Grace.

=== Return to Total Nonstop Action Wrestling (2026–present) ===
On the August 27, 2026, episode of Thursday Night Impact!, Serrano returned to Total Nonstop Action Wrestling (TNA) as a heel, where she attacked Indi Hartwell. At Bound for Glory on October 11, Serrano teamed with a debuting Shayna Baszler to defeat Allie and Kiera Hogan for the TNA Knockouts World Tag Team Championship. Serrano and Baszler later adopted the tag team name of "Apex".

== Other media ==
Serrano, as Zoey Stark, made her video game debut as a playable character in WWE 2K23 and later appeared in WWE 2K24, WWE 2K25 and WWE 2K26.

== Personal life ==
Serrano is in a long term relationship with professional wrestler, actor, and wrestling instructor Thomas Merrett Howard, who goes by the ring name Tom Howard.

== Championships and accomplishments ==
- Future Stars Of Wrestling
  - FSW Women's Championship (1 time)
- Pro Wrestling Illustrated
  - Ranked No. 86 of the top 150 female wrestlers in the PWI Women's 150 in 2021
- Rising Stars Women's Wrestling
  - Rising Stars Women's Championship (1 time, current)
- Total Nonstop Action Wrestling
  - TNA Knockouts World Tag Team Championship (1 time, current) – with Shayna Baszler
- Ultra Championship Wrestling-Zero
  - NWA UCW-Zero Ultra X Championship (2 times)
- World Series Wrestling
  - WSW Women's Championship (1 time, current)
- WWE
  - NXT Women's Tag Team Championship (1 time) – with Io Shirai
  - WWE Women's Speed Championship #1 Contender Tournament (February 5–February 26, 2025)
