= Isla Dawn =

Scottish professional wrestler (born 1994)

Personal information
- Born: Courtney Stewart; 2 February 1994 (age 32) Glasgow, Scotland
- Education: Langside College

Professional wrestling career
- Ring name(s): Courtney; Courtney Stewart; Isla Dawn; Stacy Coates
- Billed height: 5 ft 7 in (170 cm)
- Billed weight: 150 lb (68 kg)
- Billed from: Glasgow, Scotland
- Trained by: Big Damo; Aleister Black; Mikey Whiplash
- Debut: 21 December 2013

Courtney Stewart (born 2 February 1994) is a Scottish professional wrestler She is best known for her time in WWE, where she performed under the ring name Isla Dawn. She was one-half of The Unholy Union with Alba Fyre, with whom she was a one-time (and final) holder of the NXT Women's Tag Team Championship as well as a one-time WWE Women's Tag Team Champion.

== Early life ==
Courtney Stewart was born in Glasgow and grew up in the northern district of Balornock. She studied acting at Langside College, initially wanting to become an actress and a dancer. She is the youngest daughter of Johnie Stewart and Annette Florence Stewart (7 April 1965). Stewart has three older sisters: Louise Florence Stewart (25 June 1984), Debbie Florence Stewart (12 February 1986), and Melissa Florence Stewart (21 April 1987). Her uncle is Burnistoun co-creator and star Robert Florence.

== Professional wrestling career ==
=== Early career ===
On 17 October 2014, Stewart made her Tidal Championship Wrestling debut, defeating Ruby Summers at their Dark Waters event. On 3 March 2016, at Reckless Intent's Under Pressure event, Stewart defeated Nikki Storm in the first women's match for the promotion. On 20 March, Stewart competed in Pro-Wrestling: EVE's first all-female professional wrestling show in London titled "Let's Make History!", losing to April Davids by submission.

Stewart made her debut for World Wonder Ring Stardom when she was announced as one of the twelve names competing in the 2016 5Star Grand Prix Tournament. From 21 August to 9 September, she competed in the "Red Stars" block, garnering two wins and four losses, and ending with a total of four points.

=== WWE (2017–2025) ===
==== NXT UK (2018–2022) ====
On 6 November 2017 episode of Raw, Stewart wrestled under the name Stacy Coates, losing to Asuka in a squash. She later competed in the 2018 Mae Young Classic tournament, debuting the ring name Isla Dawn. She was eliminated in the first round after losing to Nicole Matthews on 8 August 2018.

On 18 June 2018, during day one of the United Kingdom Championship Tournament, Dawn made her debut on NXT in a triple threat match to determine the number one contender for the NXT Women's Championship, when Toni Storm defeated her and Killer Kelly. On 25 August (which aired on tape delay on 21 November), she competed in the first round of the NXT UK Women's Championship Tournament, losing to Storm. On 31 October episode of NXT UK, Dawn picked up her first televised win by defeating Nina Samuels. On 19 December episode of NXT UK, Dawn fought Rhea Ripley for the NXT UK Women's Championship in a losing effort. On 19 June 2019 episode of NXT UK, Dawn competed in a battle royal to determine the number one contender for the NXT UK Women's Championship, which was won by Kay Lee Ray. On 30 April 2020 (which was taped on 15 June 2019), Dawn fought Shayna Baszler for the NXT Women's Championship, but failed to capture the title.

On 11 February 2021 episode of NXT UK, Dawn fought against the debuting Meiko Satomura, where Dawn was defeated. In March, vignettes started airing of Dawn conducting occult readings through a ouija board and tarot cards. On 25 March episode of NXT UK, Dawn returned and defeated Aleah James. On 1 April episode of NXT UK, Dawn attacked the returning Emilia McKenzie, turning Dawn heel in the process. The following week, she teamed with NXT UK Women's Champion Kay Lee Ray and faced Satomura and McKenzie at NXT UK: Prelude, but they were defeated. On 15 April episode of NXT UK, Dawn defeated McKenzie. On 13 May episode of NXT UK, Dawn competed in a gauntlet match to determine the number one contender for the NXT UK Women's Championship, which was won by Satomura. The following months saw Dawn take items from various wrestlers in the women's division for a ritual.

On 24 February 2022 episode of NXT UK, Dawn interrupted NXT UK Women's Champion Meiko Satomura's celebration and wanted a shot at her title, then she attacked Satomura and stole her flowers. She received her title match on 24 March episode of NXT UK, but she lost. After the match, Dawn stole the title belt. On 14 April episode of NXT UK, Dawn returned the belt to Satomura but demanded another match under her own 'chaotic' rules, then she spat black mist into Satomura's face. On 5 May episode of NXT UK, Dawn got her rematch against Satomura in a World of Darkness match, but failed to win the title again. On 23 June episode of NXT UK, Dawn returned and defeated Myla Grace. On 21 July episode of NXT UK, Dawn defeated NXT 2.0's Fallon Henley. On 4 August episode of NXT UK, Dawn fought Blair Davenport to determine the number one contender for the NXT UK Women's Championship, ending in a no contest. On the final episode of NXT UK, Dawn competed in a four-way elimination match to determine the number one contender to the NXT UK Women's Championship, which was won by Davenport.

==== The Unholy Union (2022–2025) ====
On 15 November episode of NXT, Dawn made her first appearance on the American brand by interfering in the Last Woman Standing match for the NXT Women's Championship, spitting black mist into Alba Fyre's face, then pushing her off a ladder into the announce table, allowing Mandy Rose to retain her title. She made her in-ring debut on 6 December episode of NXT by defeating Thea Hail. After the match, Dawn was attacked by Fyre and sprayed poison mist into a referee's face that was intended for Alba Fyre. Four days later, at Deadline, the two had a match where Dawn was victorious. On 3 January 2023 episode of NXT, Dawn fought Fyre in an Extreme Resolution match, which she lost. On 13 January episode of NXT Level Up, Dawn defeated Jakara Jackson. On 1 April, at Stand & Deliver, Dawn and Fyre defeated Fallon Henley and Kiana James to win the NXT Women's Tag Team Championship, making it the first title in Dawn's career.

As part of the 2023 WWE Draft, Dawn, along with teammate Fyre, was drafted to the SmackDown brand. Dawn and Fyre made their SmackDown debut on 19 May 2023, defeating Valentina Feroz and Yulisa Leon. On 9 June episode of SmackDown, Dawn and Fyre were confronted by the WWE Women's Tag Team Champions Ronda Rousey and Shayna Baszler, who challenged them to a unification match where Dawn and Fyre lost the match on 23 June episode of SmackDown and were recognised as the final NXT Women's Tag Team Champions. Dawn and Fyre returned on 22 December episode of SmackDown to attack Damage CTRL during the Holiday Havoc Match. The team of Fyre and Dawn was renamed to The Unholy Union.

On Night 1 of the 2024 WWE Draft, both Dawn and Fyre were drafted to Raw. On 15 June 2024 at Clash at the Castle: Scotland, The Unholy Union defeated Bianca Belair and Jade Cargill for the WWE Women's Tag Team Championships in a triple threat tag team match, making The Unholy Union the second female tag team to have won the WWE and NXT Women's Tag Team Championships, but lost it to the former champions at Bash in Berlin. Dawn's last match in WWE was on 7 February 2025 episode of WWE Speed as a replacement for Alba Fyre where she lost to Shotzi in the first round of the WWE Women's Speed Championship No. 1 Contendership tournament

On 8 February 2025, Dawn was released from WWE, ending her seven-year tenure with the company and effectively disbanding The Unholy Union.

=== All Elite Wrestling / Ring of Honor (2025–present) ===
Stewart made her All Elite Wrestling debut on the August 20th, 2025 taping of Collision (aired on August 23rd), in a losing effort against Megan Bayne.

Since 2025, Dawn has begun managing The Grizzled Young Veterans (James Drake & Zack Gibson) on ROH TV.

=== Major League Wrestling (2025) ===
Dawn made her MLW debut on November 20, 2025 at Don Gato Tequila, where she lost to Scarlett Bordeaux.

== Other media ==
Isla Dawn made her video game debut as a playable character in WWE 2K24 and also included in WWE 2K25.

== Championships and accomplishments ==
- Pro Wrestling Illustrated
  - Ranked No. 96 of the top 100 female wrestlers in the PWI Women's 100 in 2019
  - Ranked No. 53 of the top 100 Tag Teams in the PWI Tag Team 100 in 2022 – with Alba Fyre
- WWE
  - WWE Women's Tag Team Championship (1 time) – with Alba Fyre
  - NXT Women's Tag Team Championship (1 time, final) – with Alba Fyre
