= Kacy Catanzaro =

American professional wrestler, gymnast and television personality (born 1990)

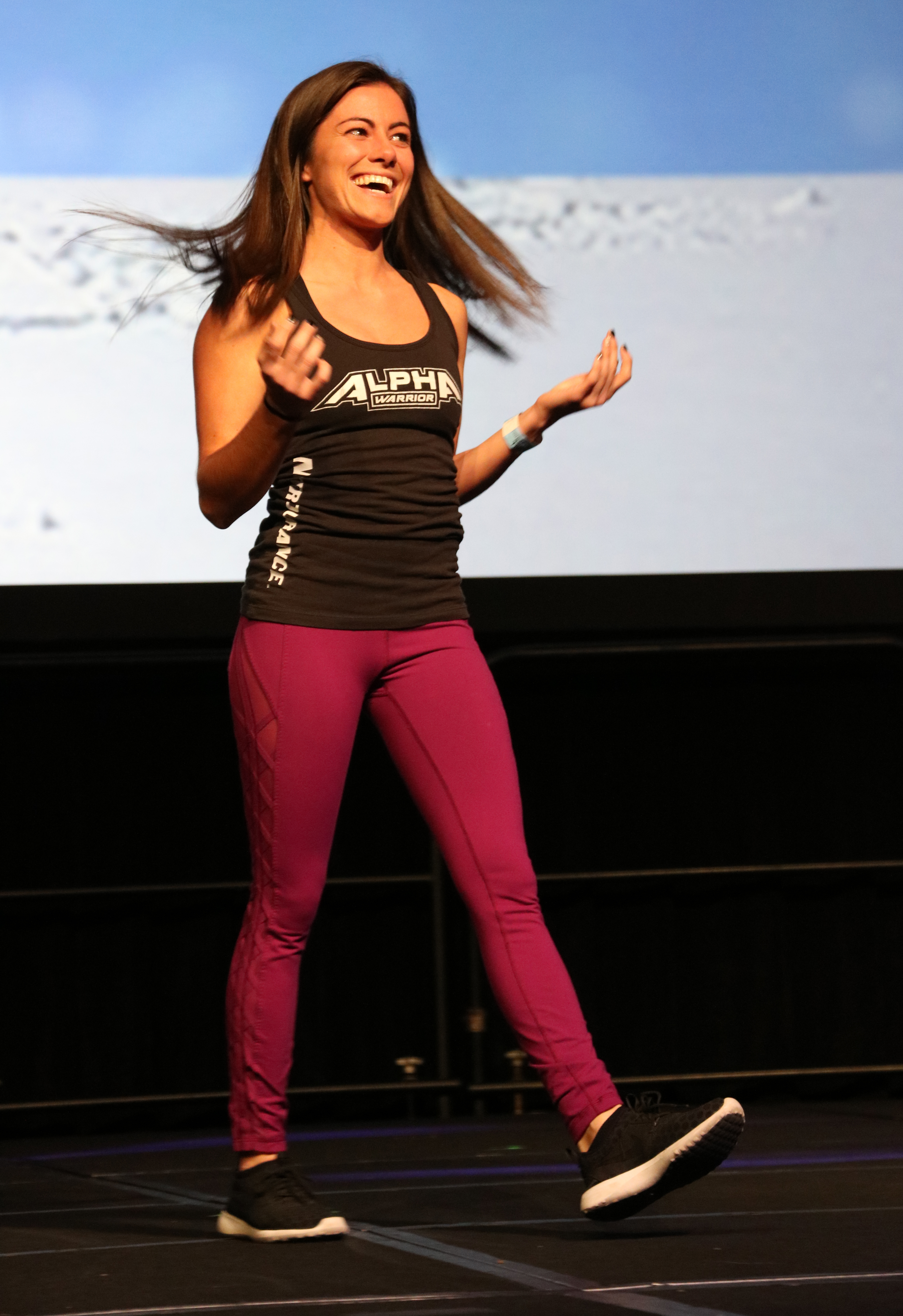
- Catanzaro in 2016
- Born: Kacy Esther Catanzaro; January 14, 1990 (age 36); Glen Ridge, New Jersey, U.S.
- Other name: Mighty Kacy
- Education: Towson University
- Occupations: Gymnast; Television personality; Professional wrestler
- Employers: Alpha Warrior (2013–2017); WWE (2017–2025)
- Professional wrestling career
- Ring name(s): Kacy Catanzaro; Katana Chance
- Billed height: 5 ft 0 in (152 cm)
- Billed weight: 100 lb (45 kg)
- Trained by: WWE Performance Center
- Debut: April 19, 2018

Kacy Esther Catanzaro (born January 14, 1990) is an American professional wrestler and a former gymnast and obstacle racer. She is known for her time in WWE, where she performed under the ring name Katana Chance. Alongside Kayden Carter, she is a one-time NXT Women's Tag Team Champion, holding the record for the longest reign in the title's history, and a one-time WWE Women's Tag Team Champion. Carter and Chance are also the first women's tag team to have won the WWE and NXT Women's Tag Team Championships.

Prior to her professional wrestling career, Catanzaro competed on the television sports show American Ninja Warrior and became the first woman to complete a City Qualifiers course and the first woman to complete a City Finals course.

== Early life and education ==
Born in Glen Ridge, New Jersey, Catanzaro grew up in nearby Belleville, where she attended Belleville High School. She is of Italian descent. Catanzaro attended Towson University in Towson, Maryland from 2009 until 2012, studying early childhood education on an athletic scholarship.

== Gymnastics career ==
=== Junior Olympic ===
Catanzaro was a Junior Olympic gymnast, having started training at age 6. She reached level 10 in 2007 and competed at the 2007 New Jersey Level 10 State Championships where she placed fifth in the Senior-A division. The following year Catanzaro competed at the 2008 New Jersey Level 10 State Championships where she placed third and advanced to the 2008 Junior Olympic National Championships. She finished 23rd overall but finished 6th on the balance beam.

=== NCAA ===
Catanzaro competed in gymnastics for Towson in Division I of the National Collegiate Athletic Association. She made her debut in the 2009 season. Catanzaro helped the Towson Tigers gymnastics team win the Eastern College Athletic Conference Championships in 2009 and 2010. In her senior year she was named the Southeast Regional Gymnast of the Year in 2012. She was also named the 2012 Eastern College Athletic Conference Gymnast of the Year and was the top-ranked competitor in that conference for that year.

== Obstacle racing career ==
=== American Ninja Warrior ===
She worked for Alpha Warrior, an obstacle-course gym in San Antonio, Texas, from February 2013.

Catanzaro spent two years training for American Ninja Warrior alongside her then-boyfriend and co-competitor Brent Steffensen. She did not complete the qualifying course in Venice, California, but was an invited wildcard at the 2013 finals, where she fell early on the Giant cycle/ring.

In 2014, Catanzaro became the first woman to complete the qualifying course of American Ninja Warrior (season 6), making it up the warped wall on her second try at 5:26.18 at the Dallas qualifiers, ranking her 21 out of 30; this also makes her the first woman to make it up the warped wall in competition. Later in 2014, Catanzaro competed in the Dallas finals of American Ninja Warrior. She was the first woman ever to complete a city finals course (and the second woman to attempt it after Jessie Graff in season 5), qualifying for the national finals in Las Vegas with a time of 8 minutes, 59 seconds. (Not until five years later, during the 2019 season, was her accomplishment of a woman completing a City Finals course matched.)

Of the 2014 city finals run, host commentator Akbar Gbaja-Biamila remarked "I've seen greatness during my NFL career...And I've been in awe of people, but I am really in awe of Kacy". The run had been especially notable because due to her short stature, many of the obstacles looked difficult to manage and in one case, she had to leap between boards whereas other competitors could traverse them. Her achievement made her a social media phenomenon, with her run being viewed over 100 million times; supporters on Twitter coined the hashtag #MightyKacy.

Catanzaro failed to complete the first stage of the National Finals in Las Vegas. She made it past the first three obstacles, including the Giant Ring and the Silk Slider, before she fell attempting the Jumping Spider, where her full extension was simply too short to hold the position.

==== Subsequent seasons ====
In the 2015 Houston Qualifying round (season 7), Catanzaro failed to complete the course after falling on the cargo crossing. She was given a wild card spot in Vegas and she failed due to a mistimed trampoline jump at the Propeller Bar at Stage 1 of the national finals. By this time the pressure she felt to live up to her broadcast reputation as Ninja's greatest female competitor was reportedly showing and she was tearful in her post-run interview with Kristine Leahy.

In 2016, Catanzaro was invited to compete in the 32nd competition of the original Japanese version of ANW, Sasuke. Catanzaro performed well, completing 8 of the stage 1 obstacles before timing out on the final obstacle, the Lumberjack Climb. Since the course's renewal and increased difficulty, Catanzaro set the record for the furthest a female athlete has gone and the closest a female athlete has gotten to completing stage 1 since the 2nd competition (until 2017 when Jessie Graff completed stage 1 and became the first woman ever to complete stage 2.)

In the 2016 Oklahoma City Qualifying round (season 8), Catanzaro failed to complete the course after falling on an early obstacle, the Log Runner; however, she was again given a Wild Card spot in Las Vegas. In the Las Vegas National Finals, Stage 1, she fell on the second obstacle.

In December 2016 Catanzaro co-hosted as a broadcaster the Team Ninja Warrior College Madness series of shows.

In 2017, Catanzaro competed in American Ninja Warrior season 9 in the San Antonio city qualifier and finals. In the former she failed on the fourth obstacle, but did well enough to qualify for city finals under the show's new rules. In that latter run she had her best performance since 2014, making it past the Sky Hooks and the fifth obstacle to get to the now-higher Warped Wall, which she failed to surmount. Nonetheless she qualified for the national finals. At the national finals, she failed on Stage 1 at the Double Dipper.

In 2017, Catanzaro announced her retirement from American Ninja Warrior, with season 9 being her last.

== Professional wrestling career ==
=== WWE (2017–2025) ===
==== Early career (2017–2020) ====
On January 4, 2017, Catanzaro received a tryout with WWE at their WWE Performance Center. It was announced on August 28 during the Mae Young Classic that Catanzaro had been signed to a contract with WWE. On January 18, 2018, WWE officially announced Catanzaro had reported to the WWE Performance Center. She made her in-ring debut at a NXT live event on April 19, in Sanford, Florida, in a losing effort to Reina González.

Catanzaro continued to make appearances during 2018, both in house shows and on NXT television; she wrestled as a face and took inspiration from WWE's Alexa Bliss's slogan "Five Feet of Fury", making reference to Catanzaro's own diminutive size. In the second episode of the Mae Young Classic, which aired on September 12, Catanzaro made her televised debut in a winning effort against Reina González in the first round match. On Episode 5, she lost in the second round to Rhea Ripley. On January 27, 2019, Catanzaro made her main roster debut, entering the Royal Rumble at number 19 and lasting 10:45, before being eliminated by Ripley. She would make her NXT debut afterwards, on March 13.

In September 2019, it was reported that Catanzaro had resigned from WWE and retired from professional wrestling due to an ongoing back injury she suffered. She returned on the January 15, 2020, episode of NXT as a surprise entrant in a women's battle royal. Catanzaro revealed in an interview that she took some time off because she had doubts about continuing in the professional wrestling business.

==== Teaming with Kayden Carter (2020–2025) ====
On the September 16 episode of NXT, Catanzaro teamed with Kayden Carter in a winning effort against Jessi Kamea and Xia Li. They participated in the 2021 Women's Dusty Rhodes Tag Team Classic tournament, defeating Mercedes Martinez and Toni Storm in the quarterfinals, but were beaten by Dakota Kai and Raquel Rodriguez in the semifinals. They would then feud with Xia Li after constantly being attacked by her throughout the following weeks. Catanzaro lost to Li on the February 24 episode of NXT and got her leg injured afterwards. The next year, Catanzaro and Carter participated in the 2022 Women's Dusty Rhodes Tag Team Classic where they defeated Diamond Mine's Ivy Nile and Tatum Paxley in the first round, but lost to Kay Lee Ray and Io Shirai in the semifinals. On April 19, Catanzaro's ring name was changed to Katana Chance. Chance and Carter won the NXT Women's Tag Team Championship in a fatal four-way tag team elimination match, lastly eliminating Toxic Attraction (Gigi Dolin and Jacy Jayne), on the August 2 episode of NXT, marking Kacy's first professional wrestling championship. They defended their titles against Doudrop and Nikki A.S.H. at Worlds Collide, and against Nikkita Lyons and Zoey Stark on the October 25 and November 8 episodes of NXT. On January 8, 2023, Catanzaro and Carter became the longest reigning NXT Women's Tag Team Champions. On the January 24 episode of NXT, they retained against Alba Fyre and Sol Ruca. At NXT Vengeance Day, Chance and Carter lost the NXT Women's Tag Team Championship to Fallon Henley and Kiana James, ending their record-setting reign at 186 days.

As part of the 2023 WWE Draft, Chance and Carter were drafted to the Raw brand. Chance and Carter made their main roster debut on the June 5 episode of Raw in a losing effort against the WWE Women's Tag Team Champions Ronda Rousey and Shayna Baszler. Almost six months later, they defeated Chelsea Green and Piper Niven for the titles, becoming the first women's tag team to have won the WWE and NXT Women's Tag Team Championships. Chance and Carter had their first successful title defense on the January 8, 2024, episode of Raw where they defeated Green and Niven in a rematch. On the January 26 episode of SmackDown, they lost the titles to Damage CTRL's The Kabuki Warriors (Asuka and Kairi Sane), ending their reign at 39 days.

In February 2025, Chance and Carter were transferred to the SmackDown brand as part of the post-2024 WWE Draft transfer window. On May 2, Chance and Carter were released from WWE.

== Other media ==
Catanzaro made her video game debut in the Banzai Pack DLC for WWE 2K22. She also appeared in WWE 2K23, WWE 2K24 and WWE 2K25 under her Katana Chance ring name.

== Personal life ==
Catanzaro previously dated fellow American Ninja Warrior competitor Brent Steffensen, and fellow professional wrestler Trevor Mann, best known under the ring name Ricochet. She is currently in a relationship with fitness trainer Naoufal Abouelhouda.

== Championships and accomplishments ==
=== Gymnastics ===
- USA Gymnastics Junior Olympics Program
  - Level 10 (USA Gymnastics)
- National Collegiate Athletic Association
  - Eastern College Athletic Conference Championships (2009, 2010)
  - Southeast Regional Gymnast of the Year (2012)
  - Eastern College Athletic Conference's Gymnast of the Year (2012)

=== Professional wrestling ===
- Pro Wrestling Illustrated
  - Ranked No. 63 of the top 100 female wrestlers in the PWI Female 100 in 2019
  - Ranked No. 78 of the top 100 Tag Teams in the PWI Tag Team 100 in 2023 - with Kayden Carter
- WWE
  - WWE Women's Tag Team Championship (1 time) – with Kayden Carter
  - NXT Women's Tag Team Championship (1 time) – with Kayden Carter
