= Toxic Attraction =

Professional wrestling stable

- Logo of Toxic Attraction

Stable
- Leader: Mandy Rose
- Members: Gigi Dolin; Jacy Jayne
- Name: Toxic Attraction
- Billed heights: Rose: 5 ft 4 in (1.63 m); Dolin: 5 ft 5 in (1.65 m); Jayne: 5 ft 6 in (1.68 m)
- Combined billed weight: 391 lb (177 kg)
- Debut: September 14, 2021
- Disbanded: February 7, 2023
- Years active: 2021–2023

Toxic Attraction was an American villainous professional wrestling stable in WWE on the NXT brand. The group originally consisted of Mandy Rose, Gigi Dolin, and Jacy Jayne. After Rose was released from her WWE contract in December 2022, Toxic Attraction became a tag team of Dolin and Jayne before they split in February 2023, ending the group.

The stable originally formed in August 2021. During their time together, Rose held the NXT Women's Championship for 413 days and unified the NXT UK Women's Championship into the NXT Women's Championship, while Dolin and Jayne held the NXT Women's Tag Team Championship for a record-tying two times. Toxic Attraction was at the forefront of the NXT women's division during the NXT 2.0 era until Rose was released in December 2022 and after Jayne turned on Dolin following an unsuccessful attempt at the NXT Women's Championship in February 2023. After the breakup, the two women would feud until the end of May. As of 2026, only Jayne remains a former member of the stable still employed with WWE.

== History ==
=== Formation and dominace (2021–2022) ===
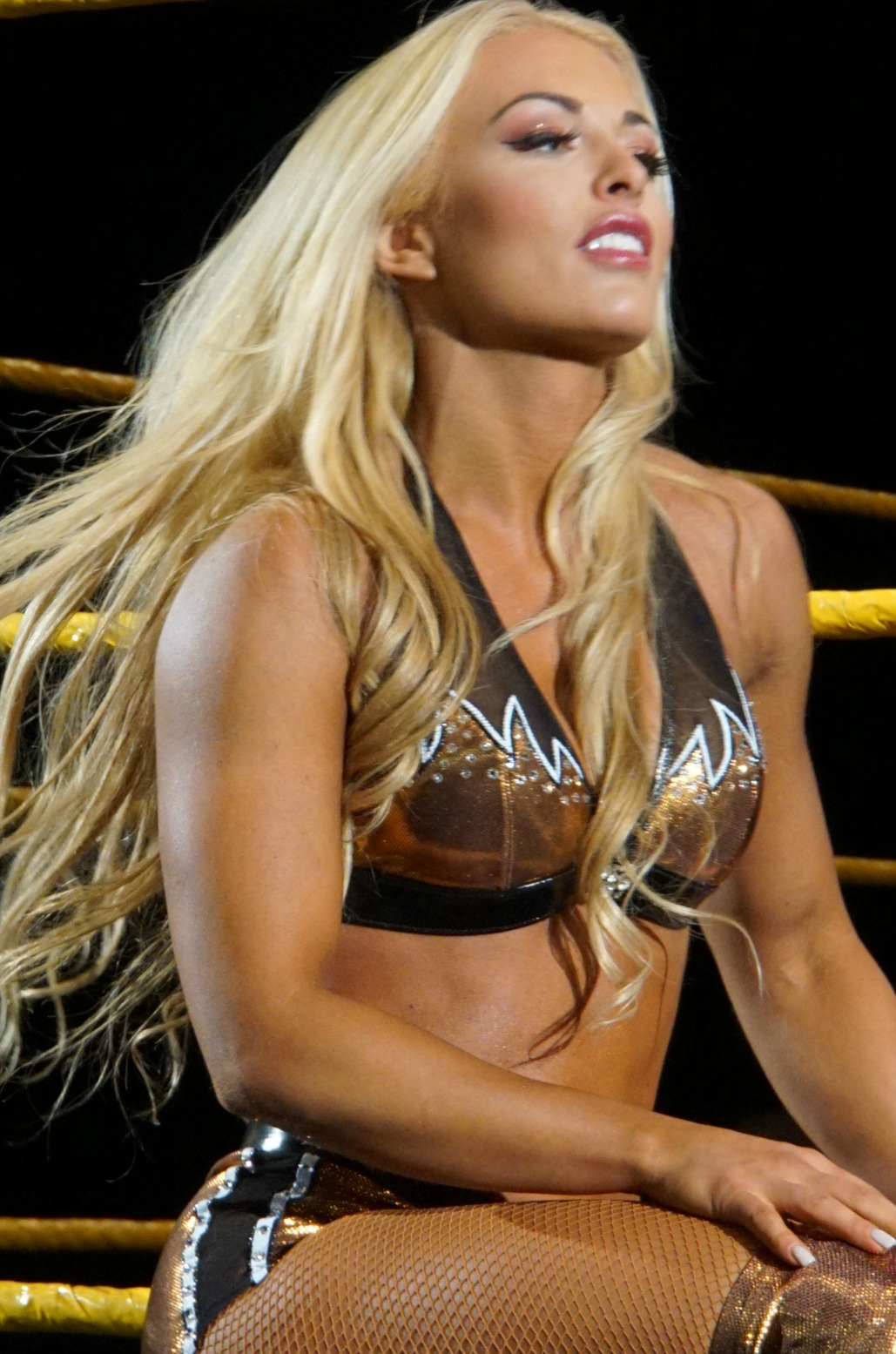
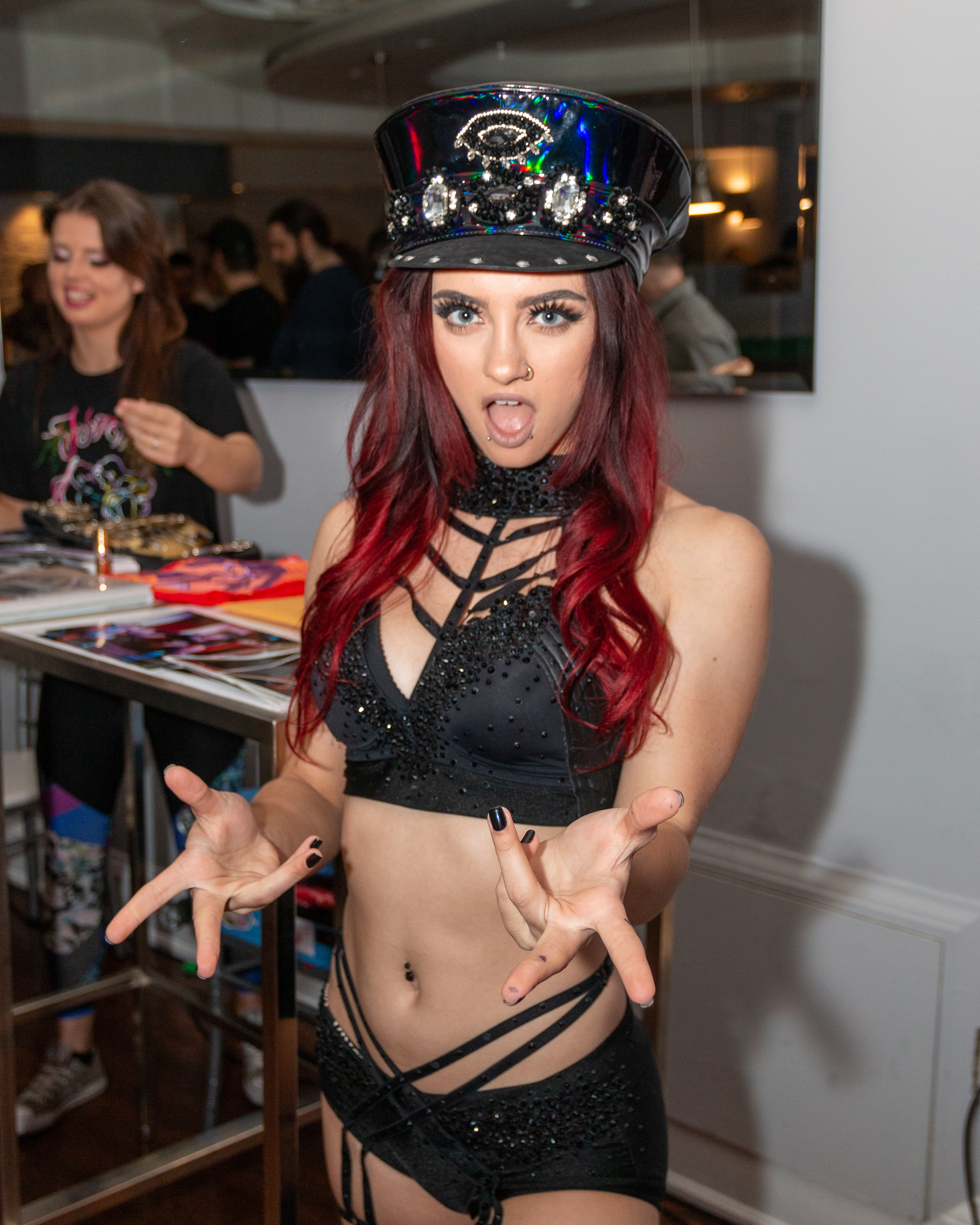
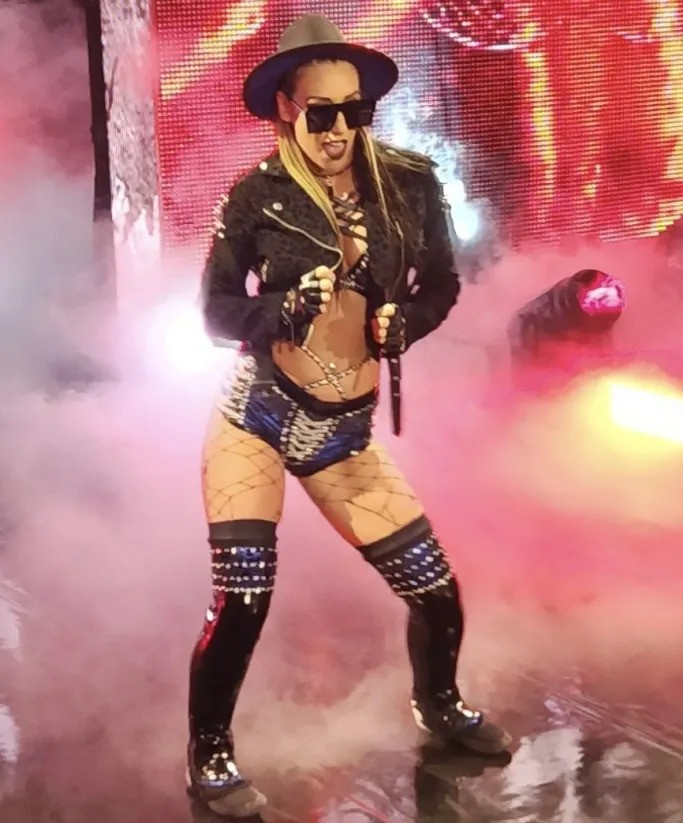
The members of Toxic Attraction: Mandy Rose (left), Jacy Jayne (right) and Gigi Dolin (middle)

On the July 13, 2021, episode of NXT, Mandy Rose, who had been performing on WWE's main roster, returned to the NXT brand and was paired with Gigi Dolin and Jacy Jayne. The trio established themselves as heels and Rose debuted a new dark-haired look. The following week, the trio named themselves "Toxic Attraction".

Following this, Rose began feuding with NXT Women's Champion Raquel González, while Dolin and Jayne began feuding with Io Shirai and Zoey Stark over the NXT Women's Tag Team Championship. At NXT: Halloween Havoc, Dolin and Jayne won a ladder match to win the NXT Women's Tag Team Championship, while Rose defeated González for the NXT Women's Championship, marking Rose's first title in her career and making Toxic Attraction the first stable to simultaneously hold all the titles in the NXT women's division in one night.

=== Breakup and feud (2022–2023) ===
Dolin and Jayne would hold the NXT Women's Tag Team Championship for 158 days, losing it during the NXT Stand & Deliver Kickoff show to Dakota Kai and Raquel González. They regained the titles three days later and held it for 91 days, losing it at NXT: The Great American Bash against Cora Jade and Roxanne Perez. Rose would hold the NXT Women's Championship for 413 days and, during her reign, she also won a triple threat match at the 2022 Worlds Collide event against NXT UK Women's Champion Meiko Satomura and Blair Davenport to unify both championships. On the December 13, 2022, episode of NXT, Rose lost her title to Perez. The next morning, Rose was released from WWE due to allegations of explicit content being posted on her FanTime page. This in turn made Toxic Attraction a standard tag team of Dolin and Jayne.

At NXT: New Year's Evil on January 10, 2023, Dolin and Jayne were declared co-winners of a 20-woman battle royal after eliminating each other simultaneously, earning an NXT Women's Championship match against Perez in a triple threat match at NXT Vengeance Day, where both women failed to win the title. Three days later on the February 7 episode of NXT, during a "Ding Dong, Hello!" segment hosted by Bayley, Jayne turned on Dolin, ending Toxic Attraction. The two then entered a feud where Dolin defeated Jayne at Roadblock in March, but Jayne won the rematch in May. In the rubber match to end their feud, Dolin defeated Jayne in a Weaponized Steel Cage match on the May 30 episode of NXT.

=== Aftermath ===
Following the end of the feud between Jayne and Dolin, Jayne would ally with Chase University before going on to forming an alliance with Jazmyn Nyx and Fallon Henley, forming Fatal Influence in 2024, though its goals and format were similar to Toxic Attraction, but not considered as a continuation of the previous group. Jayne would go on to win the NXT Women's Championship and the TNA Knockouts World Championship each. Dolin formed an alliance with Tatum Paxley and Shotzi from 2024 until Dolin was released from her WWE contract in 2025. Shotzi would also leave the company after her contract expired, ending the possibility of a reunion between Jayne and Dolin.

== Championships and accomplishments ==
- Pro Wrestling Illustrated
  - Ranked No. 21 of the top 150 female singles wrestlers in the PWI Women's 150 in 2022 – Rose
  - Ranked No. 48 of the top 150 female singles wrestlers in the PWI Women's 150 in 2022 – Dolin
  - Ranked No. 49 of the top 150 female singles wrestlers in the PWI Women's 150 in 2022 – Jayne
  - Ranked No. 14 of the top 100 Tag Teams in the PWI Tag Team 100 in 2022 – Dolin and Jayne
- WWE
  - NXT Women's Championship (1 time) – Rose
  - NXT Women's Tag Team Championship (2 times) – Dolin and Jayne
