= Fallon Henley =

American professional wrestler (born 1994)

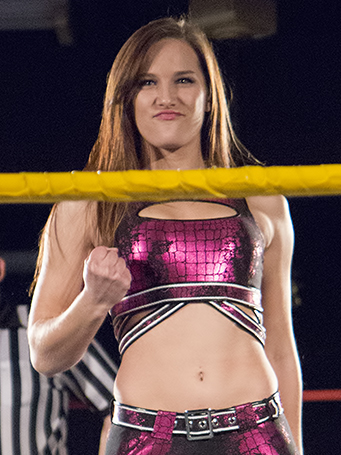
- Henley in 2018

Personal information
- Born: Theresa Lee Schuessler; September 25, 1994 (age 32) Tampa, Florida, U.S.
- Education: University of South Florida

Professional wrestling career
- Ring name(s): Anna Scheer; Fallon Henley; Tenilla Price; Tesha Price
- Billed height: 5 ft 7 in (1.70 m)
- Billed from: Chelsea, Michigan
- Trained by: Rain; WWE Performance Center
- Debut: June 24, 2017

Theresa Lee Schuessler (born September 25, 1994) is an American professional wrestler. As of 2022, she is signed to WWE, where she performs on the SmackDown brand under the ring name Fallon Henley and is a member of the Fatal Influence stable.

She is a former one-time NXT Women's North American Champion, a one-time WWE Women's Speed Champion, a one-time WWE Women's Tag Team Champion, and a one-time NXT Women's Tag Team Champion.

== Early life ==
Theresa lee Schuessler was born in Tampa, Florida, but moved with her family at the age of one to Chelsea, Michigan owing to her father's work as a pilot. Schuessler graduated from Chelsea High School in 2012 and left when she was 17 years old for college. She attended the University of South Florida and graduated with a Bachelors in Criminology and a Business certificate. Schuessler would pursue a wrestling career in 2015, while finishing her senior year.

== Professional wrestling career ==
=== Early career (2017–2021) ===
Schuessler made her professional wrestling debut at an event held by World Xtreme Wrestling (WXW) on June 24, 2017, under the ring name Tesha Price. On December 16, Price made her Shine Wrestling debut at Shine 47, competing in a battle royal to determine the number one contender for the Shine Championship, which was won by Rain. Later that night, she also competed in a four way match against Dynamite DiDi, Kikyo, and Robyn Reid, which would be won by DiDi.

Price made her All Elite Wrestling (AEW) debut on the November 6, 2020 episode of AEW Dark in a match against Big Swole, which she lost. She made her AEW Dynamite debut on December 9, where she lost to Abadon. She went on to have 21 matches in AEW from 2020 to 2021. On December 15, 2021, it was announced she would no longer take independent bookings.

=== WWE (2018–present) ===
==== Early appearances (2018–2022) ====
Schuessler appeared on the July 25, 2018 episode of NXT under the ring name Tenilla Price, losing to Lacey Evans. On August 8, now back under the ring name Tesha Price, she lost to Britt Baker in a dark match held during the second annual Mae Young Classic. On the September 21, 2021 episode of NXT, she appeared under the ring name Anna Scheer, losing to Elektra Lopez. She also appeared under the ring name Fallon Henley on the November 30 episode of NXT, faced Joe Gacy in a intergender match, which ended in a no contest. Throughout the remainder of late 2021 and into early 2022, Henley competed on 205 Live and NXT 2.0 in losing efforts against the likes of Ivy Nile, Tiffany Stratton, and Lash Legend, she would score her first victory against Tiffany Stratton at Roadblock with the help of Sarray.

==== Country Grit (2022–2024) ====
On March 17, 2022, it was announced that she officially signed a developmental contract with WWE. In April 2022, Henley's backstory was explained as she was a country girl who worked at her family's bar to pay for her wrestling training. She developed a friendship with Brooks Jensen and Josh Briggs who had similar blue collar characters, accompanying them going forward in their matches, establishing herself as a babyface in the process. Henley entered the NXT Women's Breakout Tournament, defeating Sloane Jacobs in the first round before being eliminated by Tiffany Stratton in the semifinals.

Later that year, Henley began being involved in a storyline with Kiana James. James, as part of her businesswoman gimmick, was looking to buy the Henley Family Bar and redevelop the land for condos. After a while, Henley and James developed a grudging respect and formed a tag team. At NXT Vengeance Day, on February 4, 2023, Henley and James defeated Katana Chance and Kayden Carter to win the NXT Women's Tag Team Championship, the first title in her professional wrestling career. At NXT Stand & Deliver, they lost the tag titles to Alba Fyre and Isla Dawn. Later on NXT, Henley and James tried to regain their titles against Dawn and Fyre, but they were unsuccessful. After discovering that James was cheating on Brooks Jensen with a man named Sebastian, Henley parted ways with James while Jensen choose to stay with James. However, on April 25 at Spring Breakin', Henley and Josh Briggs defeated James and Jensen, which caused James to admit to Jensen that she never actually loved him. It led to Jensen ultimately reuniting with Henley and Briggs.

On the December 5 episode of NXT, Henley took the final spot in the Women's Iron Survivor Challenge by winning a last-chance fatal four-way match against James, Roxanne Perez, and Thea Hail. At NXT Deadline, she failed to win the match. On the December 27 episode of NXT, Henley, Briggs, and Jensen agreed to go their separate ways, splitting up the team. At New Year's Evil on January 2, 2024, Henley's win over Tiffany Stratton made the latter become a "Ranch Hand for a Day". At NXT Stand & Deliver on April 6, Henley teamed up with Kelani Jordan and Thea Hail to defeat Kiana James, Izzi Dame, and Jacy Jayne in a six-woman tag team match.

==== Fatal Influence (2024–present) ====
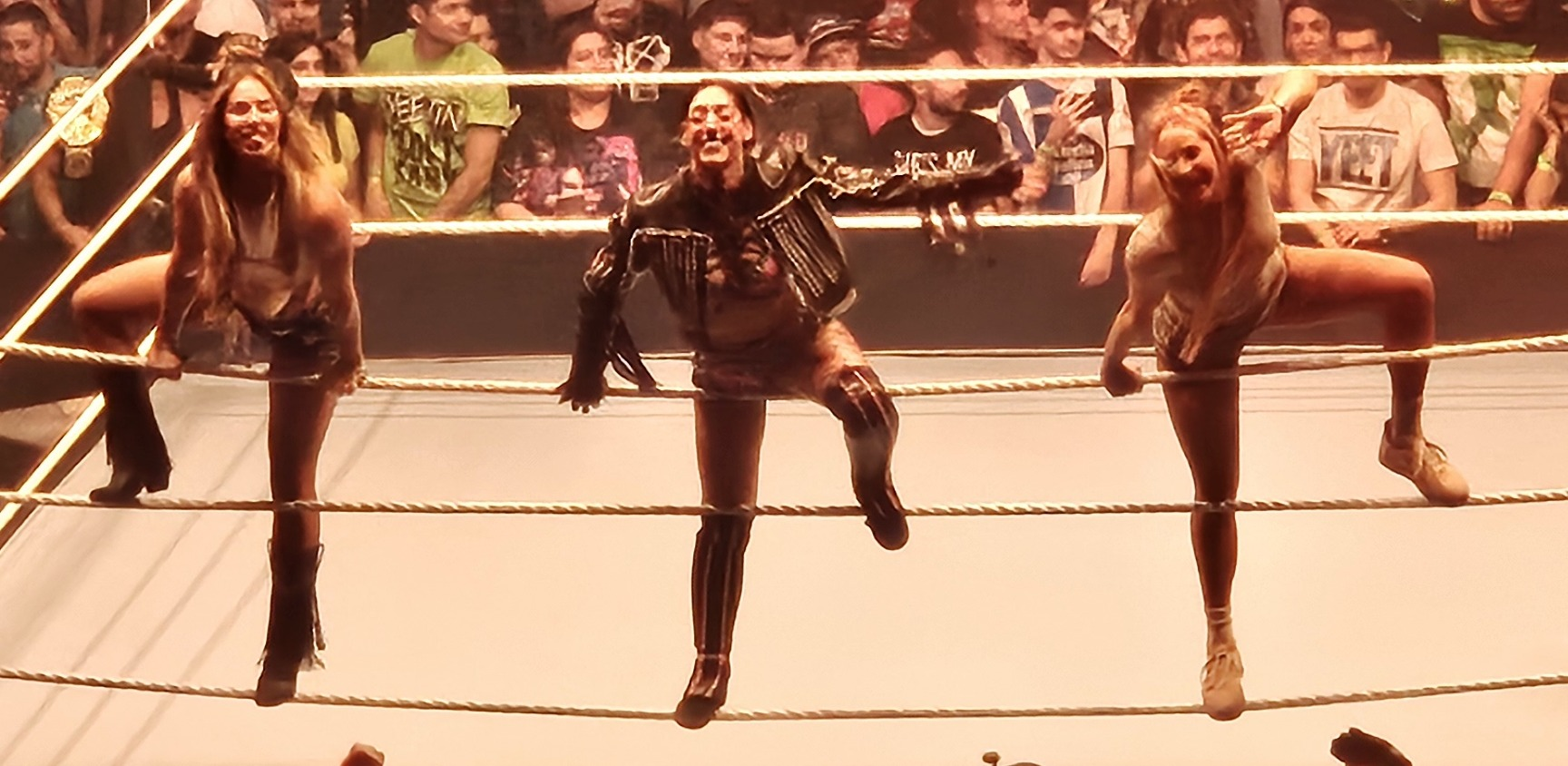
Henley (left) with Jacy Jayne (center) and Lainey Reid (right) as Fatal Influence

On April 30, at Night 2 of Spring Breakin', Henley turned heel for the first time in her career by attacking Hail following Hail's victory over Jayne. At NXT Battleground, she participated in a six-women ladder match for the newly created NXT Women's North American Championship but failed to win the title at the event. Henley’s frustrations would increase when the winner and new NXT Women's North American Champion, Kelani Jordan, chose to give Sol Ruca, the first title match at Heatwave despite both women's past friendship. Jacy Jayne would return to TV to play on Henley's frustrations, with the promise of helping her win the coveted NXT Women's North American Championship, if she were to join her and fellow associate Jazmyn Nyx. On the July 9 episode of NXT, Henley, who took issue with wrestlers with no independent wrestling background getting more opportunities in NXT, formed an alliance with Jacy Jayne. A vignette centered around their dream to become wrestlers revealed that Henley and Jayne had known each other prior to WWE, with both accepting NIL recruit Nyx as a third member who didn't fall in line with the other new Performance Center athlete recruits. The group would eventually go by the name Fatal Influence. The trio teamed up for the first time at Night 1 of NXT: The Great American Bash on July 30, where they defeated Karmen Petrovic, Lola Vice, and Sol Ruca in a six-woman tag team match.

At NXT Halloween Havoc on October 27, Kelani Jordan faced Fatal Influence in a gauntlet match for the NXT Women's North American Championship. Henley defeated Jordan to win the title as the third person in the gauntlet after interference from Jayne and Nyx, winning her first singles championship in her wrestling career. On the November 26 episode of NXT, Henley defended her title against Tatum Paxley, after which she along with Jayne and Nyx would deliver a beatdown to Paxley, until Gigi Dolin came down to even the odds, thus starting a feud with Dolin and Paxley (after which Shotzi would align with Dolin and Paxley a week later). The two teams would face off at NXT: New Year's Evil, with Fatal Influence coming out on the losing end. At NXT Vengeance Day on February 15, 2025, Henley lost the NXT Women's North American Championship to Stephanie Vaquer, ending her reign at 111 days.

Henley would make her livestreaming main event debut at The Great American Bash, teaming up with Jayne in a loss against Jordynne Grace and Blake Monroe. On November 25 at Night 2 of NXT: Gold Rush (taped November 18), Henley, who had qualified to the tournament final for the vacant WWE Women's Speed Championship, defeated Zaria to win the title. On March 17, 2026 episode of NXT, Henley would sacrifice herself during a triple threat with Jayne, Ruca, & Zaria, to help Jayne win, but ultimately leaving herself vulnerable for her Speed title defense later that night, where she would lose the title to Wren Sinclair ending her reign at 112 days.

On the April 24 episode of SmackDown, Fatal Influence officially moved to the SmackDown brand, interrupting a title match between Alexa Bliss and Charlotte Flair against WWE Women's Tag Team Champions Brie Bella and Paige. Later that night, Jayne lost to WWE Women's Champion Rhea Ripley by disqualification after Henley and Reid attacked Ripley during the match. On Saturday Night's Main Event, Henley & Reid would defeat Bella & Paige to win the WWE Women's Tag Team championships. At Night 1 of SummerSlam on August 1, Fatal Influence defeated the team of The Bella Twins (Brie Bella and Nikki Bella) and Paige in a Six-Woman Tag Team Match. On the October 9 episode of SmackDown, Henley and Reid lost the WWE Women's Tag Team Championship to Bliss and Tatum Paxley, ending their reign at 83 days.In November, Fatal Influence allied with Jade Cargill and Michin (with B-Fab) as they face Flair, Bliss, Paxley, Bayley, and Stephanie Vaquer in a WarGames match at Survivor Series: WarGames on November 28. This will be Henley's WarGames match debut.

== Other media ==
Schuessler, as Fallon Henley, made her video game debut as a playable character in WWE 2K24 and has since appeared in WWE 2K25 and WWE 2K26.

== Championships and accomplishments ==
- Pro Wrestling Illustrated
  - Ranked No. 41 of the top 250 female singles wrestlers in the PWI Women's 250 for 2025
- WWE
  - NXT Women's North American Championship (1 time)
  - WWE Women's Speed Championship (1 time)
  - WWE Women's Tag Team Championship (1 time) – with Lainey Reid
  - NXT Women's Tag Team Championship (1 time) – with Kiana James
  - WWE Women's Speed Championship Tournament (2025)
