= Kayden Carter =

American professional wrestler (born 1988)

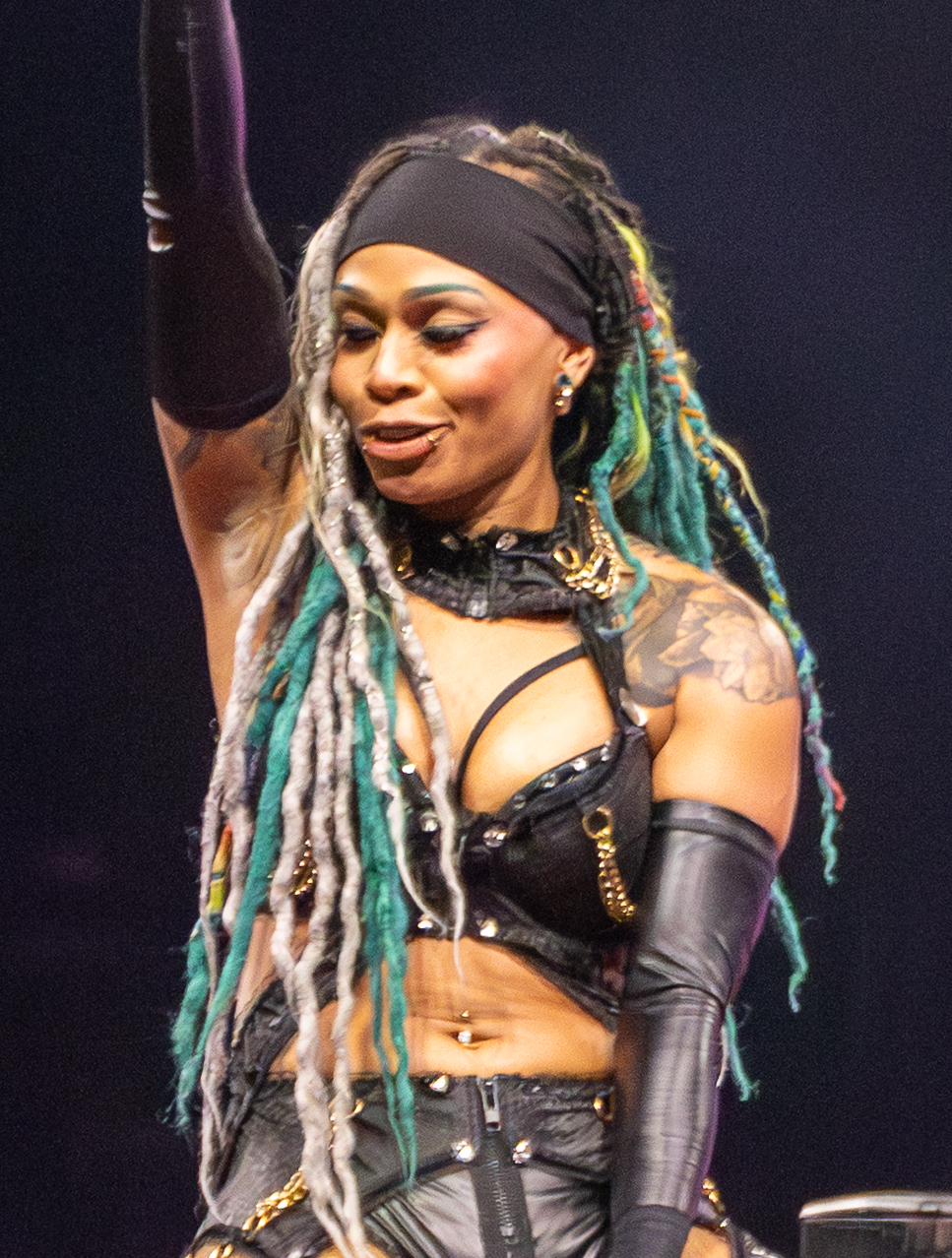
- Lane in May 2026

Personal information
- Born: Allysa Lyn Lane; May 20, 1988 (age 38) Winter Park, Florida, U.S.

Professional wrestling career
- Ring name(s): Kayden Carter; Lacey Lane
- Billed height: 5 ft 2 in (157 cm)
- Billed from: The Philippine Islands
- Trained by: The Dudley Boyz; WWE Performance Center
- Debut: August 20, 2016

Allyssa Lyn Lane (born May 20, 1988) is an American professional wrestler. She is signed to All Elite Wrestling (AEW) and Ring of Honor (ROH), where she performs under the ring name Lacey Lane.

She is best known for her time in WWE, where she performed under the ring name Kayden Carter from 2018 to 2025. Carter, alongside Katana Chance, is a former one-time and the longest-reigning NXT Women's Tag Team Champion and one-time WWE Women's Tag Team Champion.

== Early life ==
Allyssa Lyn Lane was born on May 20, 1988 in Winter Park, Florida, the daughter of a Filipina mother and Jamaican father. She played basketball at Monroe Community College before transferring to Shaw University, where she won an NCAA Division II championship in 2012 and graduated magna cum laude later that year with a BA in recreational management.

== Professional wrestling career ==
=== Early career (2016–2018) ===
Lane enrolled in the Team 3D Academy in 2016, and wrestled regularly for a number of different Florida-based independent promotions. Her first public match was a winning effort against Trish Adora for the Go Wrestle promotion in Daytona Beach in August 2016. Lane had a tryout at the WWE Performance Center in February 2017, after which she was offered a developmental contract. However, a physical examination revealed arthritis in her knee, and the contract was rescinded. Lane spent four months rehabbing her knee, and in November 2017 she joined The Crash Lucha Libre in Tijuana, Baja California, Mexico, eventually winning their Women's Championship from Keyra on January 20, 2018. She held the title for 175 days before losing it to Tessa Blanchard in a triple threat match that also included Santana Garrett on July 14, 2018.

=== WWE (2018–2025) ===
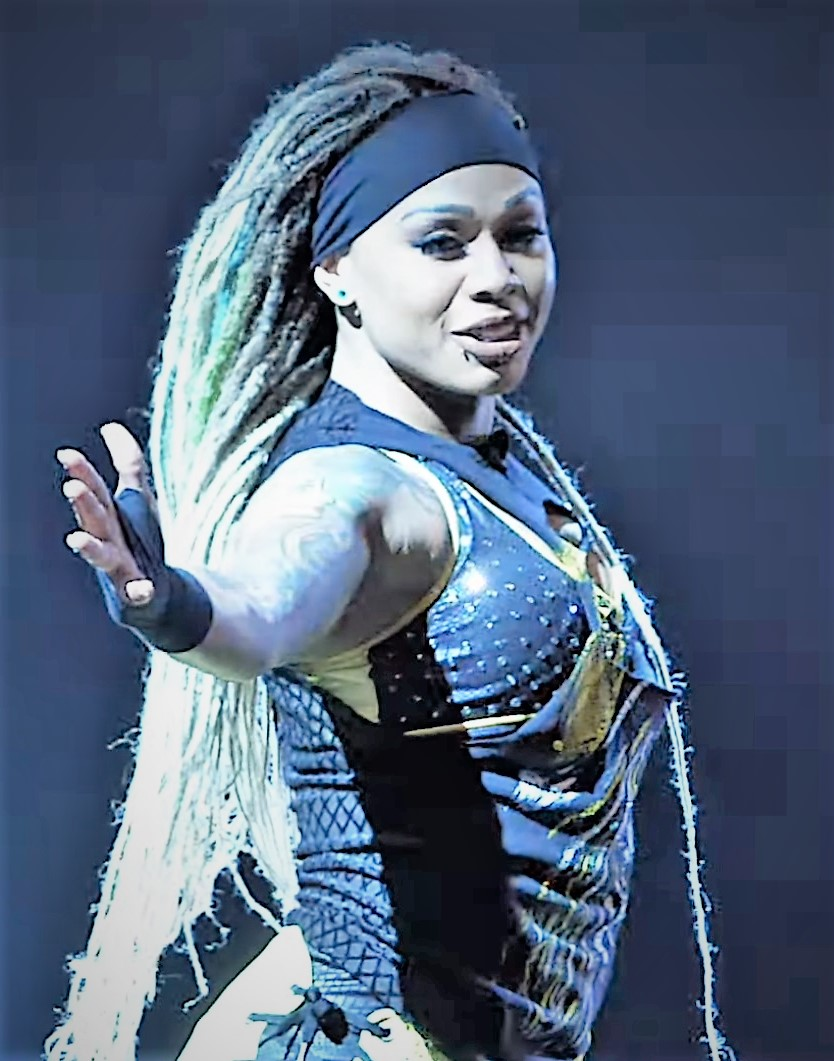
Carter in 2020

After passing a second physical, Lane signed with WWE in July 2018. Lane took part in that year's Mae Young Classic, defeating Vanessa Kraven in the first round and Taynara Conti in the second round, before being defeated by Meiko Satomura in the quarterfinals. In September 2019, Lane's ring name was changed to Kayden Carter. On the January 29, 2020, episode of NXT, Carter had her first victory on television, defeating Chelsea Green. She was defeated in their rematch on the February 19 episode of NXT.

On the September 16 episode of NXT, Carter teamed with Kacy Catanzaro in a winning effort against Jessi Kamea and Xia Li. They took part in the 2021 Women's Dusty Rhodes Tag Team Classic tournament, defeating Mercedes Martinez and Toni Storm in the quarterfinals, but were beaten by Dakota Kai and Raquel González in the semifinals. They would then feud with Xia Li after constantly being attacked by her throughout the following weeks. On the March 10 episode of NXT, Carter lost to Li by disqualification after Catanzaro hit the latter with a crutch. The next year, Catanzaro and Carter participated in the 2022 Women's Dusty Rhodes Tag Team Classic where they defeated Diamond Mine's Ivy Nile and Tatum Paxley in the first round, but lost to Kay Lee Ray and Io Shirai in the semifinals. After defeating Yulisa León and Valentina Feroz on the April 26 episode of NXT, Chance (whose name had officially been changed by WWE from Kacy Catanzaro to "Katana Chance" one week earlier) and Carter pursued the NXT Women's Tag Team Championship where they failed to win the titles at NXT In Your House from Toxic Attraction.

Carter and Chance won the vacant NXT Women's Tag Team Championship in a fatal four-way elimination match, lastly eliminating Toxic Attraction, on the August 2 episode of NXT, marking Chance's first professional title and Carter's first title in WWE. They defended their titles against Doudrop and Nikki A.S.H. at Worlds Collide, and against Nikkita Lyons and Zoey Stark on the October 25 and November 8 episodes of NXT. On January 8, 2023, Catanzaro and Carter became the longest reigning NXT Women's Tag Team Champions. On the January 24 episode of NXT, they retained against Alba Fyre and Sol Ruca. At NXT Vengeance Day, Carter and Chance lost the NXT Women's Tag Team Championship to Fallon Henley and Kiana James, ending their historic reign at 186 days.

As part of the 2023 WWE Draft, Carter, along with tag team partner Chance, was drafted to the Raw brand. Carter and Chance made their main roster debut on the June 5 episode of Raw in a losing effort against the WWE Women's Tag Team Champions Ronda Rousey and Shayna Baszler. On the December 11 episode of Raw, it was announced that Carter and Chance became the new number one contenders for the WWE Women's Tag Team Championship and would challenge Chelsea Green and Piper Niven for the titles. On the December 18 episode of Raw, Carter and Chance defeated Green and Niven to become the new WWE Women's Tag Team Champions, becoming the first female tag team to have won the WWE and NXT Women's Tag Team Championships. Carter and Chance had their first successful title defense on the January 8, 2024, episode of Raw where they defeated Green and Niven in a rematch. On the January 26 episode of SmackDown, they lost the titles to Damage CTRL's The Kabuki Warriors (Asuka and Kairi Sane), ending their reign at 39 days.

Carter and Chance were transferred to the SmackDown brand as part of the post-2024 WWE Draft transfer window in February 2025, but were released from WWE on May 2.

=== All Elite Wrestling / Ring of Honor (2025–present) ===
In October 2025, Lane began to work for All Elite Wrestling (AEW) and its sister promotion Ring of Honor (ROH), wrestling against Mina Shirakawa for the Interim ROH Women's World Television Championship and Mercedes Moné for the AEW TBS Championship, but failed to win the titles. On November 26, it was reported Lane signed with AEW.

On the January 8, 2026 episode of ROH on HonorClub, Lane joined CRU (Action Andretti and Lio Rush). At Supercard of Honor on May 15, CRU disbanded after Andretti cost Rush an ROH World Television Championship match.

== Other media ==
Lane, as Kayden Carter, made her video game debut as a playable character in WWE 2K23 and has since appeared in WWE 2K24 and WWE 2K25.

== Championships and accomplishments ==
=== Basketball ===
- CIAA women's basketball tournament champion (2 times) (2011, 2012)
- NCAA Division II national championship (1 time) (2012)

=== Professional wrestling ===
- Pro Wrestling Illustrated
  - Ranked No. 78 of the top 100 Tag Teams in the PWI Tag Team 100 in 2023 - with Katana Chance
- The Crash Lucha Libre
  - The Crash Women's Championship (1 time)
- WWE
  - NXT Women's Tag Team Championship (1 time) – with Katana Chance
  - WWE Women's Tag Team Championship (1 time) – with Katana Chance
