= Yulisa León =

Mexican professional wrestler

Personal information
- Born: Jennifer Michell Cantú Iglesias; April 9, 1996 (age 30) Monterrey, Nuevo León, Mexico

Professional wrestling career
- Ring name(s): Julisa; Julissa; Julissa Mexa; Yulisa León
- Trained by: Tony Salazar
- Debut: October 21, 2021

Jennifer Michell Cantú Iglesias (born April 9, 1996) is a Mexican professional wrestler. She is best known for her time in WWE, where she performed under the ring name Yulisa León, and was the first Mexican woman to sign with promotion. She is a second generation wrestler, her father Ulises Cantú Gutiérrez wrestled under the name of Bronco. She currently wrestles on the independent circuit in Mexico under the ring name Julissa Mexa.

== Professional wrestling career ==
=== WWE (2021–2023) ===
After she participated in some physical tests carried out in December 2019 by the WWE Performance Center, on February 26, 2021, it was reported that Iglesias had signed a contract with WWE. However, it was not until April 23 that the company announced her official arrival, presenting her as part of a new class of international recruits who would begin to hone their wrestling skills at the WWE Performance Center.

On October 19, she made her professional wrestling debut on an episode of 205 Live airing through the 22nd of the same month. There she introduced herself with the name of Yulisa León and she participated in a match between teams, where she teamed up with La Catalina to face Valentina Feroz and Amari Miller, being defeated. On the November 23 episode of NXT, she made her debut for the brand and had her first singles match against Ivy Nile, in which she was defeated. On the September 13, 2022 episode of NXT, she revealed that she had suffered an injury estimated to keep her out of action for nine months, being a torn ACL. León underwent surgery the same month, and in the words she wrote, it would be the first surgery in her fifteen years as an athlete.

After recovering, León made her return to the ring on the May 19, 2023 episode of SmackDown, where she was defeated alongside her NXT partner Valentina Feroz by the NXT Women's Tag Team Championship Alba Fyre and Isla Dawn. On September 21, 2023, Yulisa Leon was released by WWE.

=== Independent circuit (2023–present) ===
On November 3, 2023, she debuted at The Crash Lucha Libre under the ring name Julissa Mexa in Tijuana, Baja California, Mexico, where she defeated Dulce Tormenta to win The Crash Women's Championship, her first professional title in her wrestling career.

== Championships and accomplishments ==
- The Crash Lucha Libre
  - The Crash Women's Championship (1 time)
