= Royal Rumble (2024) =

WWE premium live event

- Promotional poster featuring various WWE wrestlers
- Promotion: WWE
- Brand(s): Raw; SmackDown; NXT
- Date: January 27, 2024
- City: St. Petersburg, Florida
- Venue: Tropicana Field
- Attendance: 48,044

WWE event chronology
← Previous; NXT Deadline	Next → NXT Vengeance Day

Royal Rumble chronology
← Previous; 2023	Next → 2025

The 2024 Royal Rumble was a professional wrestling premium live event (PLE) produced by WWE, held for wrestlers from the promotion's Raw, SmackDown, and NXT brand divisions. It was the 37th annual Royal Rumble event and took place on Saturday, January 27, 2024, at Tropicana Field in St. Petersburg, Florida. It was the third Royal Rumble held in the Tampa Bay area, following the 1995 and 2021 events, and the second at Tropicana Field after 2021; however, as that event was held without an audience via the ThunderDome due to the COVID-19 pandemic, this was the first Royal Rumble at the stadium to have live fans in attendance. It was subsequently the seventh Royal Rumble held in the U.S. state of Florida, including 1990, 1991, 2006, and 2016.

The event was based around the Royal Rumble match, a modified 30-person battle royal in which the participants enter at timed intervals instead of all beginning in the ring at the same time and the respective men's and women's winners received a world championship match at WrestleMania. For the 2024 event, the men's and women's winners received a choice of which championship to challenge for at WrestleMania XL. The men's winner could choose to challenge for either Raw's World Heavyweight Championship or SmackDown's Undisputed WWE Universal Championship, while the women's winner had the choice between Raw's Women's World Championship and SmackDown's WWE Women's Championship. This was the first Royal Rumble to feature this version of the World Heavyweight Championship after it was introduced in April 2023, subsequently being the first Royal Rumble since 2022 in which the men's winner had two separate choices. The 2024 Men's Royal Rumble match, which was the main event of the card, was won by Raw's Cody Rhodes for a second consecutive year. This made Rhodes the first wrestler since "Stone Cold" Steve Austin (1997 and 1998) to win back-to-back Royal Rumble matches, and fourth overall, after Austin, Shawn Michaels (1995 and 1996), and Hulk Hogan (1990 and 1991). It also made him the 10th overall two-time winner. The 2024 Women's Royal Rumble match opened the show and was won by Bayley from SmackDown, who also broke the record for longest time spent in the women's match, lasting 1:03:03.

In addition to the two Royal Rumble matches, two other matches were contested on the card, which were for SmackDown championships. In the first, Roman Reigns retained the Undisputed WWE Universal Championship in a fatal four-way match against Randy Orton, LA Knight, and AJ Styles, while Logan Paul defeated Kevin Owens by disqualification to retain the WWE United States Championship. Notably, this was WWE's first PLE since the 2022 Elimination Chamber in which Roman Reigns wrestled in a match that was not the main event.

This was the first Royal Rumble event to officially be promoted for NXT. The women's Royal Rumble match notably marked the WWE in-ring debut of Jade Cargill, who signed with the company in September 2023. TNA Knockouts World Champion Jordynne Grace from Total Nonstop Action Wrestling (TNA) also made a surprise appearance in the women's eponymous match. The event also saw the returns of Naomi, Liv Morgan, Andrade, and Omos in the men's and women's Royal Rumble matches, while the men's match was also notable for CM Punk's first WWE televised match since the 2014 Royal Rumble. This was also the first Royal Rumble to livestream on Abema in Japan and the final Royal Rumble to air on Disney+ Hotstar in Indonesia, Binge in Australia, and the standalone WWE Network in most other international markets, as WWE's content in those areas moved to Netflix in January 2025. This was also WWE's first PLE not to involve Vince McMahon or any member of the McMahon family in any capacity—excluding his son-in-law, Paul "Triple H" Levesque—since his resignation as executive chairman of TKO Group Holdings a day before amidst a sex trafficking scandal.

== Production ==
=== Background ===
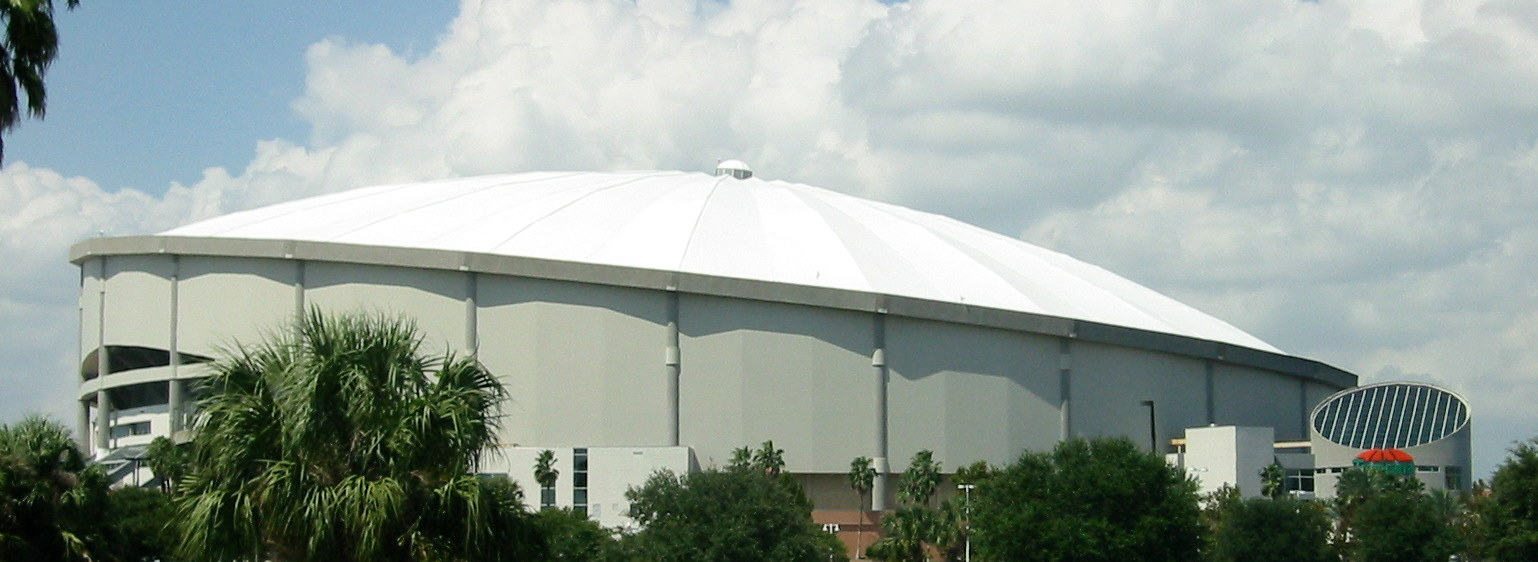
The 37th annual Royal Rumble was the second time for the event to be held at Tropicana Field in St. Petersburg, Florida, after the 2021 event, but the first time with live fans in attendance due to the COVID-19 pandemic that year.

The Royal Rumble is an annual professional wrestling premium live event (PLE), produced every January by WWE since 1988; that first event was a television special before it became a pay-per-view (PPV) event beginning in 1989 and then also simulcast on WWE's livestreaming platforms since 2015. It is one of the promotion's original four PPVs, along with WrestleMania, SummerSlam, and Survivor Series, referred to as the "Big Four", and as of August 2021, it is considered one of the "Big Five", along with Money in the Bank. It is named after and centered on the Royal Rumble match.

Announced on September 13, 2023, the 37th Royal Rumble was scheduled to be held on Saturday, January 27, 2024, at Tropicana Field in St. Petersburg, Florida, and it featured wrestlers from the Raw, SmackDown, and NXT brand divisions, which made this the first Royal Rumble to officially be promoted for NXT. This was the second Royal Rumble to be held at Tropicana Field after the 2021 event, but the first with live fans in attendance as the 2021 event was produced by way of a bio-secure bubble called the WWE ThunderDome due to the COVID-19 pandemic that year. This in turn marked the third Royal Rumble to be held in the Tampa Bay area, but the first with fans in attendance since the 1995 event, which was in Tampa itself. It was subsequently the seventh Royal Rumble held in the U.S. state of Florida, including the 1990, 1991, 2006, and 2016 events. Tickets went on sale on October 20, 2023, with premium hospitality packages also available.

The Royal Rumble match is a modified battle royal in which the participants enter at timed intervals instead of all beginning in the ring at the same time, and the match generally features 30 wrestlers. Since 1993, the winner traditionally earns a world championship match at that year's WrestleMania. For 2024, the men and women could choose to challenge for either brand's top championship at WrestleMania XL: the men had their choice between Raw's World Heavyweight Championship Championship or SmackDown's Undisputed WWE Universal Championship, while the women could choose either Raw's Women's World Championship or SmackDown's WWE Women's Championship. This was the first Royal Rumble to feature this version of the World Heavyweight Championship after it was introduced in April 2023 and became exclusive to Raw after the Undisputed WWE Universal Championship became exclusive to SmackDown in the 2023 WWE Draft, subsequently being the first Royal Rumble since 2022 in which the men's winner had two separate choices.

Days before the Royal Rumble event, Janel Grant, a former employee at WWE headquarters between 2019 and 2022, filed a lawsuit against WWE as well as TKO (by proxy of ownership). Grant alleged that WWE owner Vince McMahon had coerced her into a sexual relationship and, along with WWE executive John Laurinaitis and a WWE wrestler who was described as a former fighter in Ultimate Fighting Championship (UFC), (Note: The WWE/UFC talent in question was not named in the original lawsuit, but was identified by The Wall Street Journal as Brock Lesnar, who was later named in an amended lawsuit.) sexually trafficked her and repeatedly sexually assaulted her during 2020–2021. Grant alleged that she was subjected to "extreme cruelty and degradation" by McMahon, including being defecated upon during a sexual encounter. Grant stated that McMahon had agreed to pay her US$3 million in 2022 in return for a non-disclosure agreement, but stopped paying after only $1 million had been paid following the initial public emergence of the sexual misconduct allegations the same year. Federal prosecutors subpoenaed McMahon, and took up the filing in question. One day after the report of the claims, on January 26, 2024, McMahon resigned from TKO. In a statement, McMahon said the decision was made "out of respect for the WWE Universe, the extraordinary TKO business and its board members and shareholders, partners and constituents, and all of the employees". Ari Emanuel took over as the Chairman of TKO. In response, Slim Jim, the sponsor of the event, temporarily paused its promotional work due to allegations, only to resume the next day after McMahon resigned. The removal of McMahon from the TKO board made the 2024 edition of the Royal Rumble the first major WWE PLE without him or any of his family involved in any capacity, aside from his son-in-law, Paul "Triple H" Levesque. (Note: Vince's daughter, Stephanie McMahon, would eventually appear at WrestleMania XL in April.)

=== Broadcast outlets ===
The Royal Rumble was available through traditional PPV outlets worldwide. It was also available to livestream on Peacock in the United States, SonyLIV in India, Disney+ Hotstar in Indonesia, Disney+ in the Philippines, Binge in Australia, Abema in Japan, and the WWE Network everywhere else. It was the first Royal Rumble to livestream on Abema, after the Japanese version of the WWE Network merged under Abema in October 2023.

Four days before the event on January 23, WWE announced that all of the WWE Network content would move to Netflix in most countries where the former was still available as a standalone service in January 2025, making the 2024 event the final Royal Rumble to livestream on the WWE Network in those areas, as well as Disney+ Hotstar and Binge, which also moved to Netflix at that time. A select few territories maintained the standalone WWE Network until early 2026 due to pre-existing contracts before they also merged under Netflix when those contracts expired.

=== Storylines ===
The event included four matches that resulted from scripted storylines. Results were predetermined by WWE's writers on the Raw and SmackDown brands, while storylines were played out on WWE's weekly television shows, Monday Night Raw and Friday Night SmackDown.

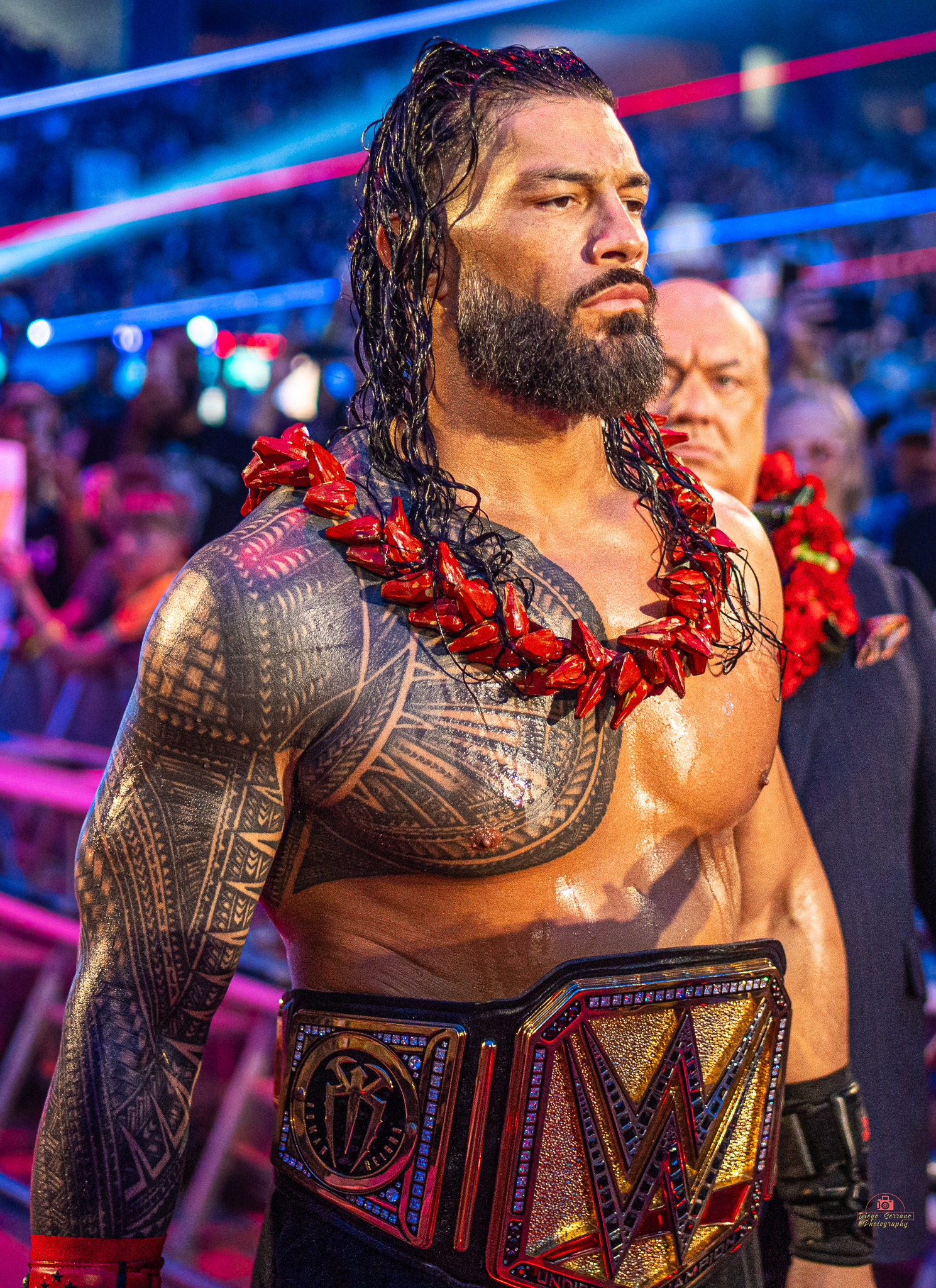
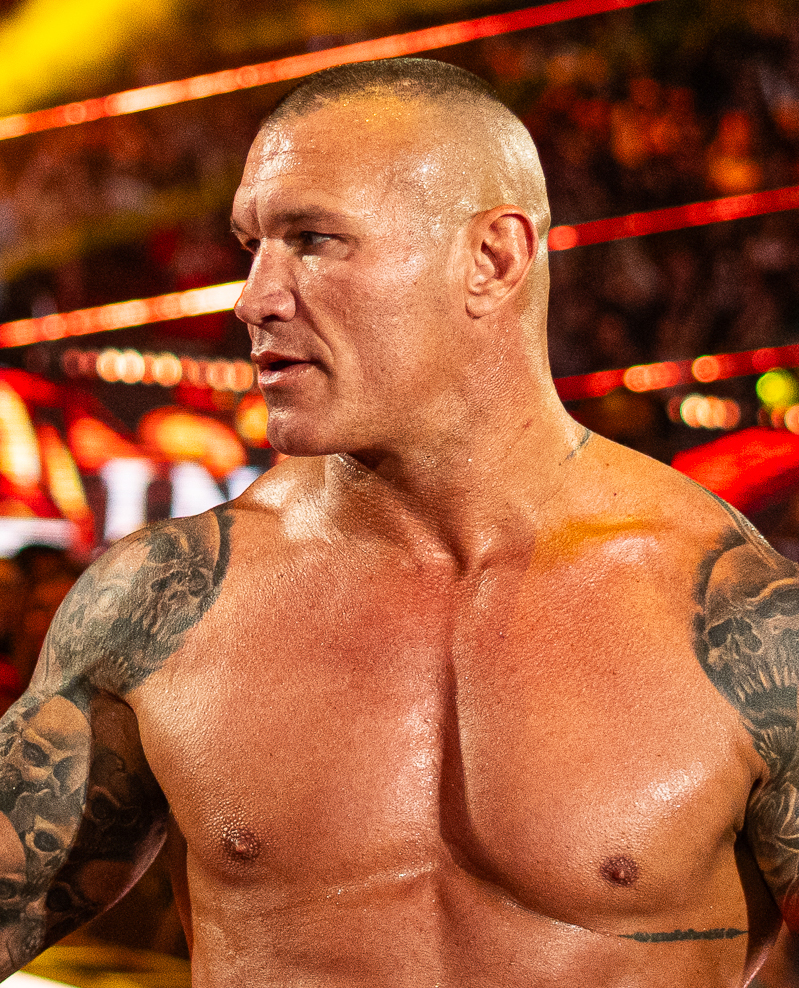
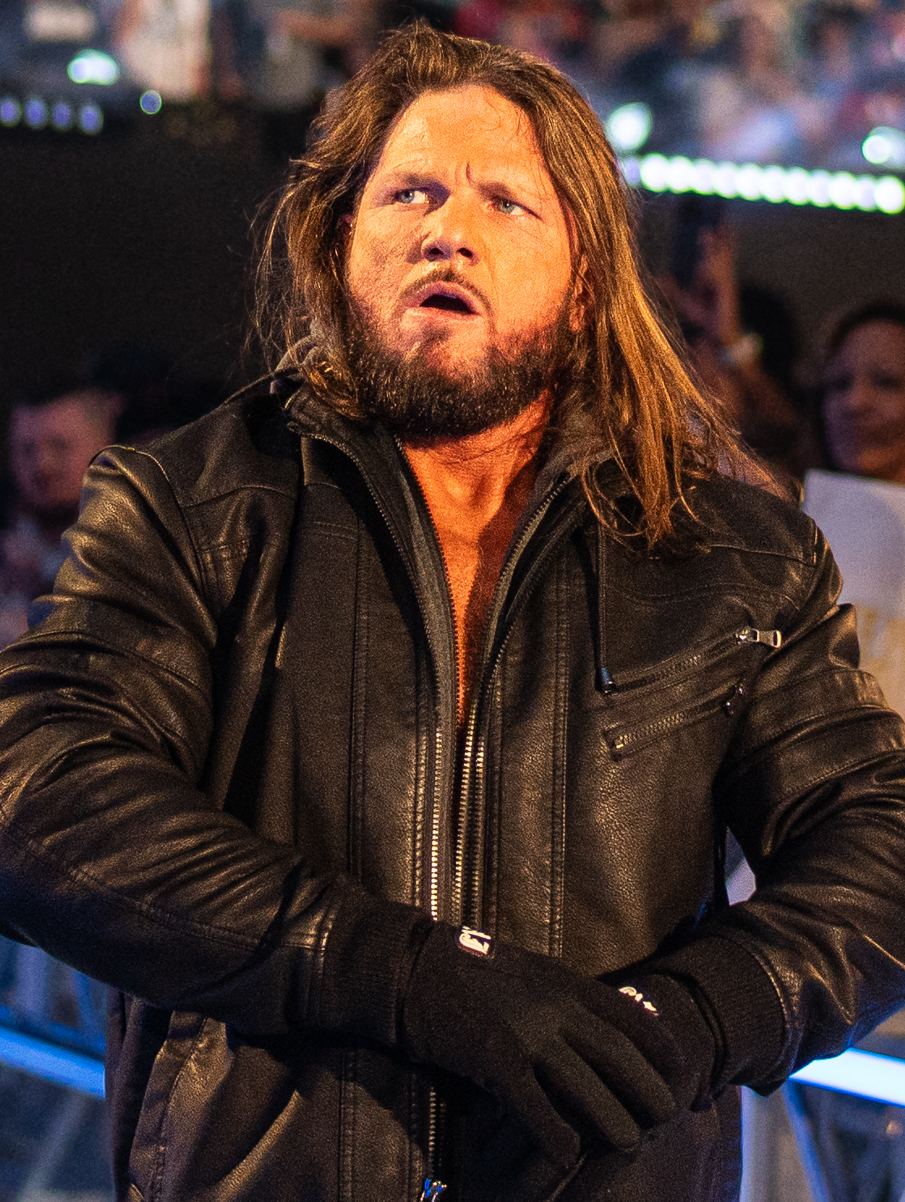
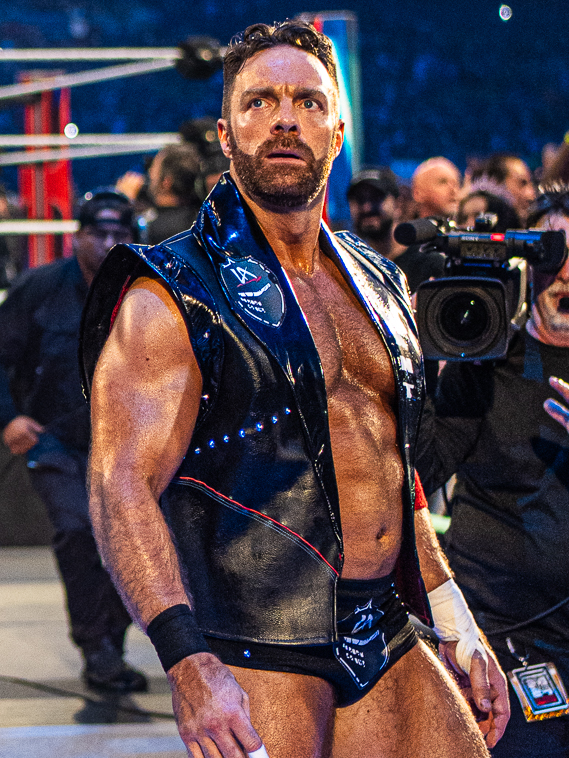
Roman Reigns defended his Undisputed WWE Universal Championship against Randy Orton, AJ Styles, and LA Knight in a fatal four-way match.

Before he went on hiatus in May 2022 due to a back injury, Randy Orton had been feuding with The Bloodline (Roman Reigns, Jey Uso, and Jimmy Uso). The following year at Crown Jewel in November 2023, Reigns defeated LA Knight to retain the Undisputed WWE Universal Championship after interference from The Bloodline. On the following episode of SmackDown, Knight stated that he was not done with The Bloodline until he defeated Reigns for the title. Orton then returned at Survivor Series: WarGames later that same month, and on the December 1 episode of SmackDown, he signed with the SmackDown brand after fending off an attack by The Bloodline (which had since added Solo Sikoa, while Jey had left the group and the SmackDown brand earlier that summer), vowing to get revenge. Two weeks later, the returning AJ Styles helped Knight and Orton fend off The Bloodline before attacking Knight. The following week, Styles explained that he attacked Knight for taking his spot in a tag team match at Fastlane in October 2023. After Orton interrupted and said that he also wanted a title match against Reigns, SmackDown General Manager Nick Aldis announced that Orton, Styles, and Knight would compete in a triple threat match at SmackDown: New Year's Revolution on January 5, 2024, where the winner would face Reigns for the Undisputed WWE Universal Championship at the Royal Rumble. However, the match ended in a no contest after The Bloodline attacked all three competitors. As a result, Aldis announced that Reigns would instead defend his championship in a fatal four-way match against Orton, Knight, and Styles at the Royal Rumble.

At Crown Jewel on November 4, 2023, Logan Paul won his first WWE title, the United States Championship. Paul made his first appearance as champion on the December 1 episode of SmackDown where he announced that his first challenger would be determined by an eight-man tournament. The tournament was won by Kevin Owens at SmackDown: New Year's Revolution on January 5, 2024, thus earning him a match against Paul for the title at the Royal Rumble.

== Event ==
Other on-screen personnel
Role:	Name:
English commentators	Michael Cole
English commentators	Corey Graves
English commentators	Pat McAfee
Spanish commentators	Marcelo Rodriguez
Spanish commentators	Jerry Soto
Ring announcer	Samantha Irvin
Referees	Danilo Anfibio
Referees	Shawn Bennett
Referees	Jessika Carr
Referees	Dan Engler
Referees	Daphanie LaShaunn
Referees	Eddie Orengo
Referees	Ryan Tran
Referees	Rod Zapata
Interviewer	Kayla Braxton
Pre-show panel	Jackie Redmond
Pre-show panel	Peter Rosenberg
Pre-show panel	Booker T
Pre-show panel	Wade Barrett

=== Preliminary matches ===
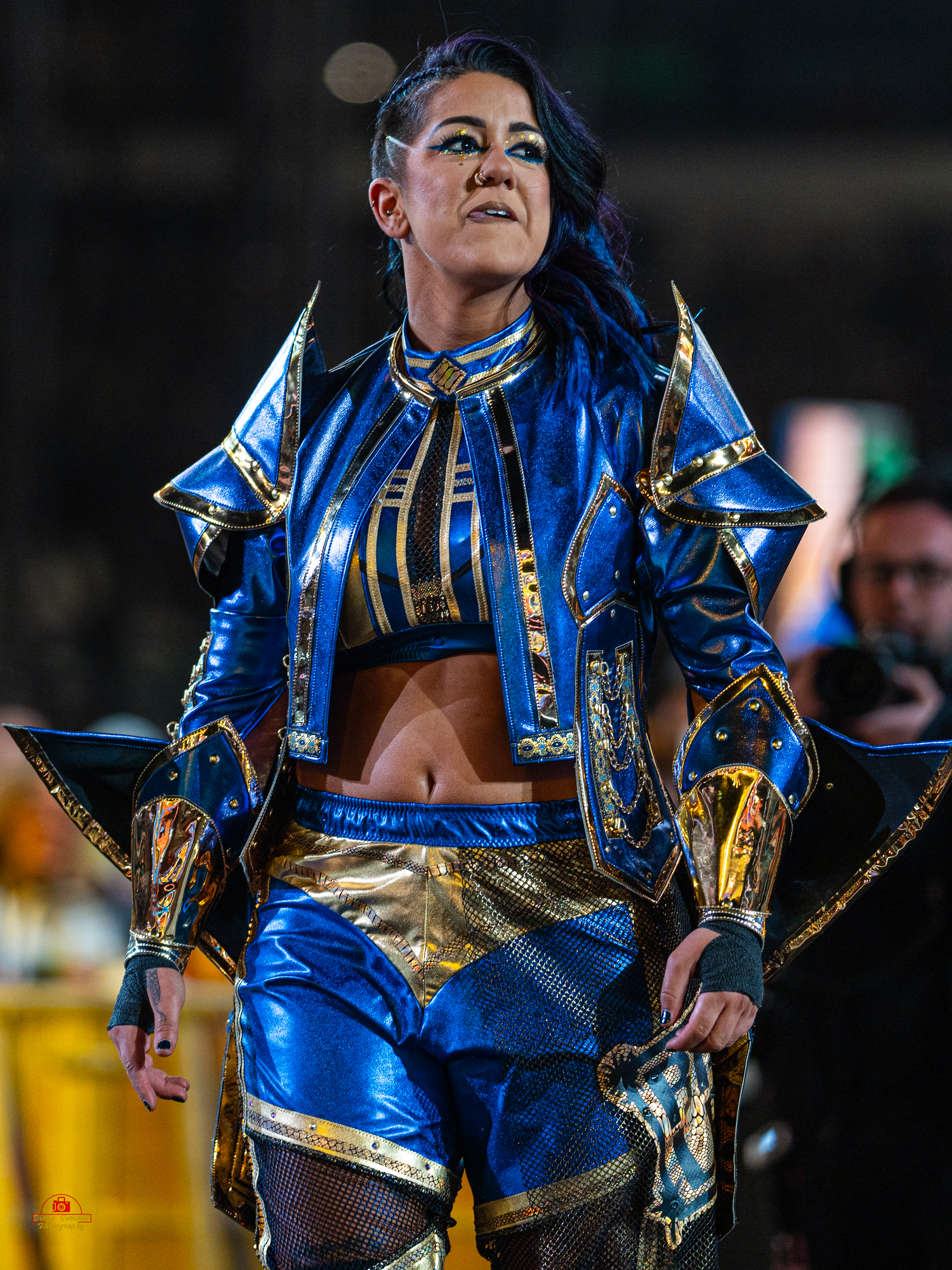
Bayley, the winner of the 2024 women's Royal Rumble match

The PLE opened with the Women's Royal Rumble match. The first two entrants were Natalya from Raw, who continued her streak of being in every Women's Rumble, and Naomi, who returned to WWE after walking out of the company in May 2022 and after performing in Total Nonstop Action Wrestling (TNA) the preceding few months. She was followed by SmackDown's Bayley at number three. TNA Knockouts World Champion Jordynne Grace entered at number five as a surprise entrant, and briefly reignited her feud with Naomi, who she defeated in Naomi's final TNA match for the title. Past Women's Rumble winners Asuka (2018) and Bianca Belair (2021), both from SmackDown, later entered at numbers seven and 10, respectively. As the ring filled up, Raw's Nia Jax entered at number 19 and went on a run of eliminations. 2019 winner Becky Lynch from Raw entered at number 21. As Raw's Valhalla was making her entrance as the 24th entrant, R-Truth (who was assigned as the 24th entrant for the Men's match) also tried to enter the match, not realizing that this was the Women's Rumble. Jade Cargill was another surprise entrant at number 28, making her WWE in-ring debut, and eliminated Jax and Naomi (who lasted for over an hour). Raw's Liv Morgan was the final entrant, making her return after over six months due to injury, and also continuing her streak of being in every Women's Rumble. Bayley, Cargill, and Morgan were the final three, and after Morgan eliminated Cargill, Bayley then eliminated Morgan to win the Rumble, and in the process set the new Women's Rumble longevity record at 1:03:03. She was also the second woman to win the match from the #3 position after Belair in 2021 and third person overall. In addition to the win this made Bayley the first Mexican-American female wrestler to win the Royal Rumble and the second ethnicity wrestler after Rey Mysterio in 2006 to win the event.

After that, Roman Reigns defended the Undisputed WWE Universal Championship against Randy Orton, AJ Styles, and LA Knight in a fatal four-way match. All three challengers started the match by triple teaming Reigns, then eventually paired off into their own battles. Orton hit his RKO finishing move on all of the other participants and attempted to pin Reigns, before Solo Sikoa attacked Orton on Reigns' behalf. Reigns eventually hit the spear on Styles to score the pinfall, winning the match and retaining his title.

The penultimate match saw Logan Paul defend the United States Championship against Kevin Owens. Paul spent much of the match attacking Owens' injured right hand. One of Paul's friends, Jeff Levin tried to give Paul a pair of brass knuckles, but he was ejected by the referee. Austin Theory and Grayson Waller—who had been feuding with Owens as well as forming an alliance with Paul—then came out during this moment with Theory instead giving Paul the brass knuckles. Owens, however, got a hold of them and knocked out Paul, but during the pin, the referee saw the knuckles on Owens' hand, resulting in Owens being disqualified and giving Paul the victory to retain. After the match, Owens powerbombed Paul through the announcers' table.

=== Main event ===
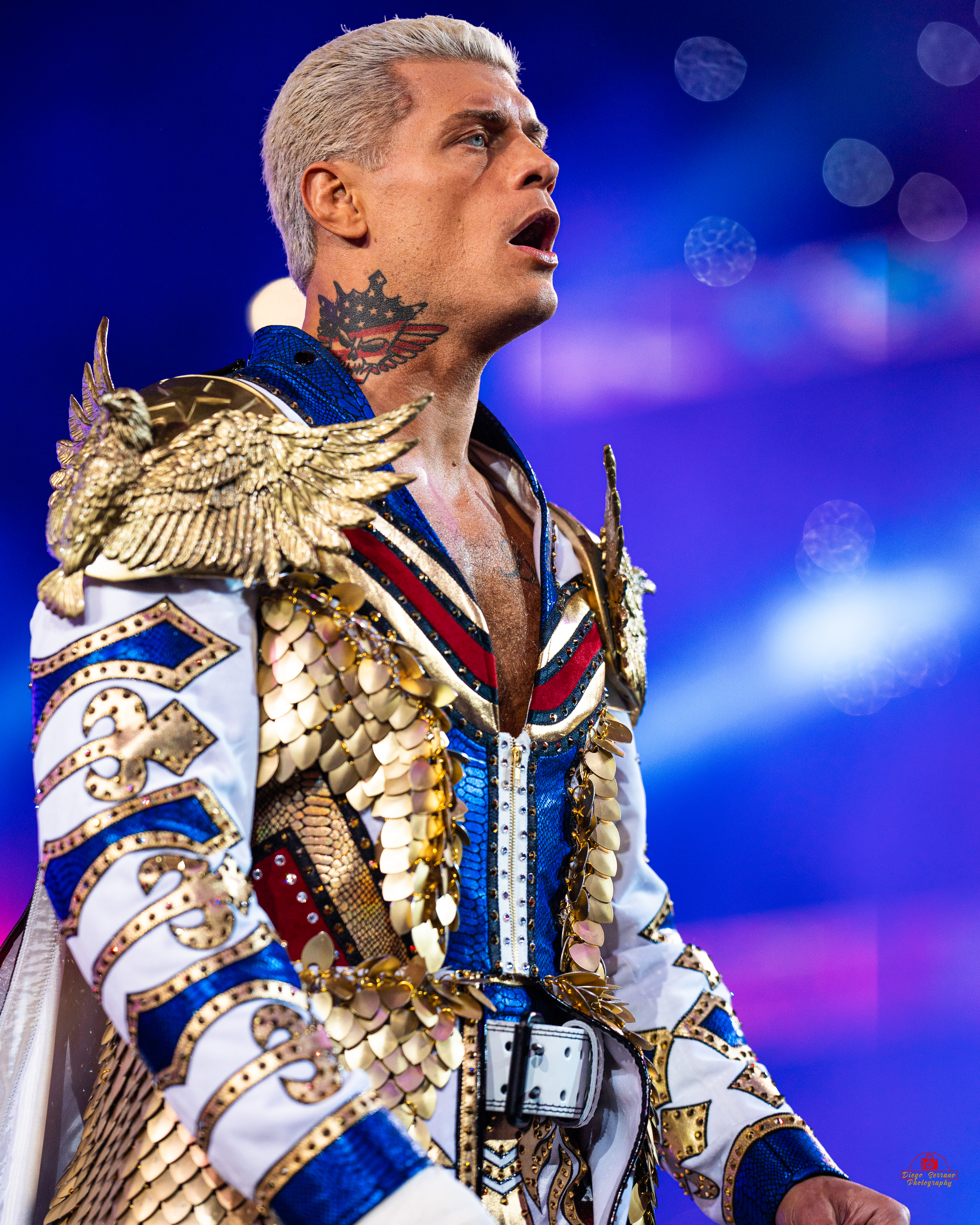
For a second consecutive year, Cody Rhodes won the men's Royal Rumble match, becoming only the fourth person to win back-to-back Rumbles, after "Stone Cold" Steve Austin (1997 and 1998), Shawn Michaels (1995 and 1996), and Hulk Hogan (1990 and 1991).

The main event was the Men's Royal Rumble match. It began with Raw's Jey Uso at number one and his brother Jimmy from SmackDown at number two. Andrade, who returned to WWE after leaving the company in March 2021 and then worked for All Elite Wrestling, entered as a surprise participant at number four, as did Carmelo Hayes from NXT, who made his Rumble debut at number five, followed by 2018 Rumble winner Shinsuke Nakamura from Raw at number six. SmackDown's Bobby Lashley (#11) eliminated eighth entrant Karrion Kross also from SmackDown, but Kross' Final Testament stablemates Authors of Pain (Akam and Rezar) stormed the ring, leading to Kross coming back in to eliminate Lashley, resulting in a ringside brawl between the Final Testament, Lashley, and his associates The Street Profits (Angelo Dawkins and Montez Ford). As the ring filled up, 2023 Rumble winner Cody Rhodes from Raw entered at number 15. NXT's Bron Breakker made his Rumble debut at number 20, and scored several rapid eliminations. Omos was next at number 21, followed by surprise entrant Pat McAfee (#22), who had earlier made a surprise return as a commentator for the event. After coming face to face with the over seven foot tall Omos, McAfee backed away and eliminated himself by climbing over the top rope and returned to commentary. Raw's CM Punk, who returned to WWE at Survivor Series: WarGames in November 2023, entered at number 27, marking his first WWE televised match since the 2014 Royal Rumble match. 2020 Rumble winner Drew McIntyre entered at number 29 followed by Sami Zayn as the number 30 and final entrant, both from Raw.

Jey was eliminated after a stint of 50 minutes and 50 seconds. The final four were Rhodes, Raw's Gunther (#18), Punk, and McIntyre. After Punk and Rhodes eliminated McIntyre and Gunther, respectively, Punk and Rhodes engaged in a lengthy back and forth exchange of attempted eliminations, before Rhodes finally threw him over the top rope to win the match for a second consecutive year. With this victory, Rhodes became the first wrestler since "Stone Cold" Steve Austin (1997 and 1998) to win back-to-back Rumbles, and fourth overall after Austin, Shawn Michaels (1995 and 1996), and Hulk Hogan (1990 and 1991). After pointing to the WrestleMania sign, Rhodes pointed to Roman Reigns and his Undisputed WWE Universal Championship, who was spectating the main event from the audience, seemingly choosing him as his opponent for WrestleMania XL.

== Reception ==
WrestleTix reported 46,082 tickets had been distributed, whilst WWE reported a sell-out crowd of 48,044 fans.

== Aftermath ==
=== Raw ===
During the Royal Rumble post-event press conference, Cody Rhodes, who won the men's Royal Rumble as a Raw wrestler, seemingly made his decision of which world championship he would challenge for at WrestleMania XL. He stated that while he respected Seth "Freakin" Rollins and his run with the World Heavyweight Championship on Raw, Rhodes said that he needed to finish his story and defeat Roman Reigns for the Undisputed WWE Universal Championship, as he failed to do so at WrestleMania 39 the previous year. However, on the following episode of Raw, Rollins explained why Rhodes should instead challenge him at WrestleMania, stating that the title Reigns held lost its luster due to Reigns defending it so infrequently, and the shady reputations of other past champions, while Rollins made his title representative of the blue collar, workhorse style that Cody's father Dusty Rhodes embodied. A conflicted Rhodes said he would think about it. Rhodes then appeared on SmackDown and confronted Reigns and said that he would eventually win Reigns' title, but not at WrestleMania. The Rock then came out and stared down Reigns in the ring as the episode went off the air, seemingly challenging for Reigns' title at WrestleMania, which has since drawn intense fan backlash. However, during the WrestleMania XL Kickoff event on February 8, Rhodes announced that he had in fact chosen Reigns, much to the dismay of Reigns and Rock.

Two days after the event, reports emerged that CM Punk had gotten injured during the men's Royal Rumble match. Punk, with his arm in a sling, opened that night's episode of Raw and confirmed that he tore his right triceps and would have to miss WrestleMania XL. He was interrupted by Drew McIntyre, who Punk had eliminated in the match. McIntyre said he had hoped Punk would get injured so he could instead go to WrestleMania and challenge for a world championship. Punk then said that whenever he comes back, McIntyre would be his first target.

On the same episode of Raw, it was announced that Pat McAfee had returned to WWE full-time to be a commentator alongside Michael Cole for the brand, and on the heels of his return at the Royal Rumble, Andrade became a member of the Raw roster.

Jey Uso and Jimmy Uso's rivalry continued after the Royal Rumble. On the February 19 episode of Raw, Jimmy cost Jey the Intercontinental Championship. They were eventually scheduled for a match at WrestleMania XL, which Jey won.

=== SmackDown ===
On WWE The Bump the day after the Royal Rumble, Bayley, who won the women's Royal Rumble as a SmackDown wrestler, seemingly confirmed that she would challenge Rhea Ripley for the Women's World Championship at WrestleMania XL due to her Damage CTRL stablemate Iyo Sky holding the WWE Women's Championship. Bayley subsequently appeared on the following episode of Raw to officially announce her decision, but after being interrupted by Ripley and then Ripley being attacked by Nia Jax, who warned Bayley that Ripley would not make it to WrestleMania, Bayley said she would make her announcement on SmackDown. On that episode, Bayley eavesdropped on Sky and The Kabuki Warriors (Asuka and Kairi Sane) say something in Japanese with Sky saying they would end Bayley that night. Later in the ring, Bayley confronted Sky, Asuka, and Sane, revealing she understood what they were saying and wondered why they made fun of her. The three then attacked Bayley, who decided that she would challenge Sky for the WWE Women's Championship at WrestleMania, turning face. Meanwhile, on the February 5 episode of Raw, Ripley was scheduled to defend the Women's World Championship against Jax at Elimination Chamber: Perth.

On the same episode of SmackDown, Naomi and Tiffany Stratton—both surprise entrants in the Women's Rumble—announced they had signed with SmackDown full time (Naomi coming in as a free agent after leaving TNA and Stratton from NXT). Two weeks later, Bron Breakker—a surprise Rumble entrant on the men's side—had signed with SmackDown, coming over from NXT.

The rivalries between LA Knight and AJ Styles continued, as well as Kevin Owens and United States Champion Logan Paul. During the men's Elimination Chamber match at Elimination Chamber: Perth, Styles snuck into the chamber and attacked Knight with a steel chair, resulting in his elimination, while Randy Orton eliminated Owens and Paul, who in turn caused Orton to be eliminated by punching him with brass knuckles. A triple threat match between Orton, Owens, and Paul for the United States Championship was then scheduled for WrestleMania XL, as well as a match between Styles and Knight.

The Pride (Bobby Lashley, Angelo Dawkins, and Montez Ford) also continued their rivalry with The Final Testament (Akam, Rezar, Karrion Kross, Paul Ellering, and Scarlett), leading to a six-man tag team Philadelphia Street Fight between the two teams at WrestleMania XL.

== Results ==
No.	Results	Stipulations	Times
1	Bayley won by last eliminating Liv Morgan	30-woman Royal Rumble match for a world championship match at WrestleMania XL	1:05:00
2	Roman Reigns (c) (with Paul Heyman) defeated AJ Styles, LA Knight, and Randy Orton by pinfall	Fatal four-way match for the Undisputed WWE Universal Championship (Note: The name "Undisputed WWE Universal Championship" referred to both the WWE Championship and Universal Championship being held and defended together, although both titles remained independently active despite the undisputed championship being represented by one title belt.)	19:30
3	Logan Paul (c) defeated Kevin Owens by disqualification	Singles match for the WWE United States Championship	14:00
4	Cody Rhodes won by last eliminating CM Punk	30-man Royal Rumble match for a world championship match at WrestleMania XL	1:08:25
(c) / – the champion(s) heading into the match

=== Women's Royal Rumble match entrances and eliminations ===
– Raw
– SmackDown
– NXT
– TNA
– Unaffiliated
– Winner

Draw	Entrant	Brand/Status	Order	Eliminated by	Time	Elimination(s)
1	Natalya	Raw	3	Tegan Nox	20:57	0
2	Naomi	Unaffiliated	25	Jade Cargill	1:02:18 (Note: Naomi broke the longevity record for the Women's Royal Rumble match, previously held by Rhea Ripley and Liv Morgan, who both lasted 1:01:08 in 2023's Royal Rumble. This record was broken by Bayley less than a minute later.)	2
3	Bayley	SmackDown	—	Winner	1:03:03	7
4	Candice LeRae	Raw	2	Bayley, Asuka, and Kairi Sane	15:23	0
5	Jordynne Grace	TNA	7	Bianca Belair	19:10	0
6	Indi Hartwell	Raw	1	Bayley	03:23	0
7	Asuka	SmackDown	6	Katana Chance and Kayden Carter	12:59	1
8	Ivy Nile	Raw	10	Nia Jax	23:27	0
9	Katana Chance	Raw	13	Nia Jax	25:48	1
10	Bianca Belair	SmackDown	26	Bayley	47:46	1
11	Kairi Sane	SmackDown	5	Kayden Carter	05:00	1
12	Tegan Nox	Raw	4	Bayley	01:22	1
13	Kayden Carter	Raw	8	Piper Niven	11:48	2
14	Chelsea Green	Raw	14	Becky Lynch	17:32	0
15	Piper Niven	Raw	12	Nia Jax	12:39	1
16	Xia Li	Raw	9	Nia Jax	06:46	0
17	Zelina Vega	SmackDown	17	Shayna Baszler and Zoey Stark	20:00	0
18	Maxxine Dupri	Raw	11	Bayley	06:39	0
19	Nia Jax	Raw	21	Jade Cargill	20:15	8
20	Shotzi	SmackDown	20	Nia Jax	15:14	0
21	Becky Lynch	Raw	24	Jade Cargill and Naomi	22:29	1
22	Alba Fyre	SmackDown	16	Naomi	06:21	0
23	Shayna Baszler	Raw	18	Nia Jax	08:27	1
24	Valhalla	Raw	15	Nia Jax	00:05	0
25	Michin	SmackDown	19	Nia Jax	05:02	0
26	Zoey Stark	Raw	22	Liv Morgan	09:58	1
27	Roxanne Perez	NXT	23	Tiffany Stratton	08:29	0
28	Jade Cargill	Unaffiliated	28	Liv Morgan	11:03	3
29	Tiffany Stratton	NXT	27	Bayley	06:52	1
30	Liv Morgan	Raw	29	Bayley	06:26	2

=== Men's Royal Rumble match entrances and eliminations ===
– Raw
– SmackDown
– NXT
– Unaffiliated
– Winner

Draw	Entrant	Brand/Status	Order	Eliminated by	Time	Elimination(s)
1	Jey Uso	Raw	23	Gunther	50:55	1
2	Jimmy Uso	SmackDown	12	Bron Breakker	34:09	0
3	Grayson Waller	SmackDown	1	Carmelo Hayes	04:05	0
4	Andrade	Unaffiliated	8	Bronson Reed	22:59	0
5	Carmelo Hayes	NXT	6	Finn Bálor	17:06	1
6	Shinsuke Nakamura	Raw	9	Cody Rhodes	20:51	0
7	Santos Escobar	SmackDown	2	Carlito	06:37	0
8	Karrion Kross	SmackDown	4	Bobby Lashley	06:20	1
9	"Dirty" Dominik Mysterio	Raw	21	CM Punk	33:19	1
10	Carlito	SmackDown	3	Bobby Lashley	02:23	1
11	Bobby Lashley	SmackDown	5	Karrion Kross (Note: Karrion Kross was already eliminated when he returned to eliminate Bobby Lashley later in the match.)	01:34	2
12	Ludwig Kaiser	Raw	10	Kofi Kingston	09:29	0
13	Austin Theory	SmackDown	7	Cody Rhodes	03:58	0
14	Finn Bálor	Raw	13	Bron Breakker	11:21	1
15	Cody Rhodes	Raw	—	Winner	43:21	4
16	Bronson Reed	Raw	14	Omos	10:39	1
17	Kofi Kingston	Raw	11	Gunther	03:34	1
18	Gunther	Raw	28	Cody Rhodes	30:10	3
19	Ivar	Raw	15	Bron Breakker	04:57	0
20	Bron Breakker (Note: Brock Lesnar was originally supposed to enter in the match, but due to being referenced in a sex trafficking lawsuit against Vince McMahon, he was pulled from the match and his spot was given to Breakker.)	NXT	18	"Dirty" Dominik Mysterio	05:19	4
21	Omos	Unaffiliated	17	Bron Breakker	02:43	1
22	Pat McAfee	Unaffiliated	16	Himself	00:38	1
23	JD McDonagh	Raw	19	Jey Uso	00:03	0
24	R-Truth	Raw	20	Damian Priest	02:56	0
25	The Miz	Raw	22	Gunther	06:06	0
26	Damian Priest	Raw	25	Sami Zayn	10:24	1
27	CM Punk	Raw	29	Cody Rhodes	21:45	2
28	Ricochet	Raw	24	Drew McIntyre	05:10	0
29	Drew McIntyre	Raw	27	CM Punk	09:52	2
30	Sami Zayn	Raw	26	Drew McIntyre	03:19	1

=== WWE United States Championship #1 Contender Tournament ===
First round SmackDown; December 8–15, 2023
Dragon Lee	9:09
Santos Escobar	Pin
Bobby Lashley	Pin
Karrion Kross	9:46
Carmelo Hayes	Pin
Grayson Waller	10:23
Austin Theory	13:32
Kevin Owens	Pin

Semifinals; SmackDown; December 15, 2023 (aired December 22)
Santos Escobar	Pin
Bobby Lashley	8:44
Carmelo Hayes	10:04
Kevin Owens	Pin

Final; SmackDown: New Year's Revolution; January 5, 2024
Santos Escobar	16:35
Kevin Owens	Pin
