= SummerSlam (2025) =

WWE premium live event

- Promotional poster featuring John Cena and Cody Rhodes
- Promotion: WWE
- Brand(s): Raw; SmackDown
- Date: August 2–3, 2025
- City: East Rutherford, New Jersey
- Venue: MetLife Stadium
- Attendance: Night 1: 53,161; Night 2: 60,561; Combined: 113,722

WWE event chronology
← Previous; Evolution	Next → NXT Heatwave

SummerSlam chronology
← Previous; 2024	Next → 2026

The 2025 SummerSlam, also promoted as SummerSlam: New Jersey, was a two-part professional wrestling premium live event (PLE) produced by WWE, held for wrestlers from the promotion's main roster brands, Raw and SmackDown. It was the 38th annual SummerSlam and took place as a two-night event on Saturday, August 2, and Sunday, August 3, 2025, at MetLife Stadium in East Rutherford, New Jersey, marking the first SummerSlam to take place across two nights, which was previously only reserved for WrestleMania since WrestleMania 36 in 2020. Rapper Cardi B served as the hostess of the event.

This was WWE's third PLE to be held at MetLife Stadium, after WrestleMania 29 in 2013 and WrestleMania 35 in 2019, and it was subsequently the fourth SummerSlam to take place in East Rutherford, after the 1989, 1997, and 2007 events. It was also the first SummerSlam to broadcast on Netflix in most international markets after the WWE Network merged under the platform in January 2025 in those areas, and it would also be the last on the WWE Network in any country as the last few countries that were still on the service due to pre-existing contracts merged under Netflix on April 1, 2026. It was also the final SummerSlam to air on Disney+ in the Philippines before it too merged under Netflix on January 1, 2026, as well as the last to air on Peacock in the United States as ESPN's direct-to-consumer streaming service assumed the streaming rights for WWE's main roster PLEs in the US beginning in September. The event also featured John Cena's last match at a SummerSlam due to his retirement from professional wrestling at the end of 2025.

The card comprised a total of 13 matches, with seven on the first night (including an impromptu match) and six on the second. In the main event of Night 1, CM Punk defeated Gunther to win Raw's World Heavyweight Championship, after which, Seth Rollins cashed in his Money in the Bank contract and defeated Punk to win the title. In other prominent matches, Tiffany Stratton defeated Jade Cargill to retain SmackDown's WWE Women's Championship and in the opening bout, Roman Reigns and Jey Uso defeated Bron Breakker and Bronson Reed.

In the main event of Night 2, Cody Rhodes defeated John Cena in a Street Fight to win SmackDown's Undisputed WWE Championship. In other prominent matches, Dominik Mysterio defeated AJ Styles to retain Raw's WWE Intercontinental Championship, The Wyatt Sicks (Dexter Lumis and Joe Gacy) won a Six-Pack Tables, Ladders, and Chairs match to retain SmackDown's WWE Tag Team Championship, and in the opening bout, Naomi defeated Rhea Ripley and Iyo Sky in a triple threat match to retain Raw's Women's World Championship. The second night of the event was also notable for the surprise return of Brock Lesnar, who had been on hiatus from WWE since the 2023 SummerSlam.

The event received mostly positive reviews, with the main events of both nights being universally acclaimed, while the first night's opening tag team match, the TLC match, the Women's World Championship match, the WWE Women's Intercontinental Championship match, and Jelly Roll's performance during his bout, where he teamed with Randy Orton in a losing effort against Logan Paul and Drew McIntyre in a tag team match, garnered widespread praise. Criticism was directed towards Sami Zayn vs. Karrion Kross and the WWE Women's Championship match. The return of Lesnar amidst his involvement in the Vince McMahon sex trafficking scandal was met with intense controversy among analysts and fans alike.

== Production ==
=== Background ===
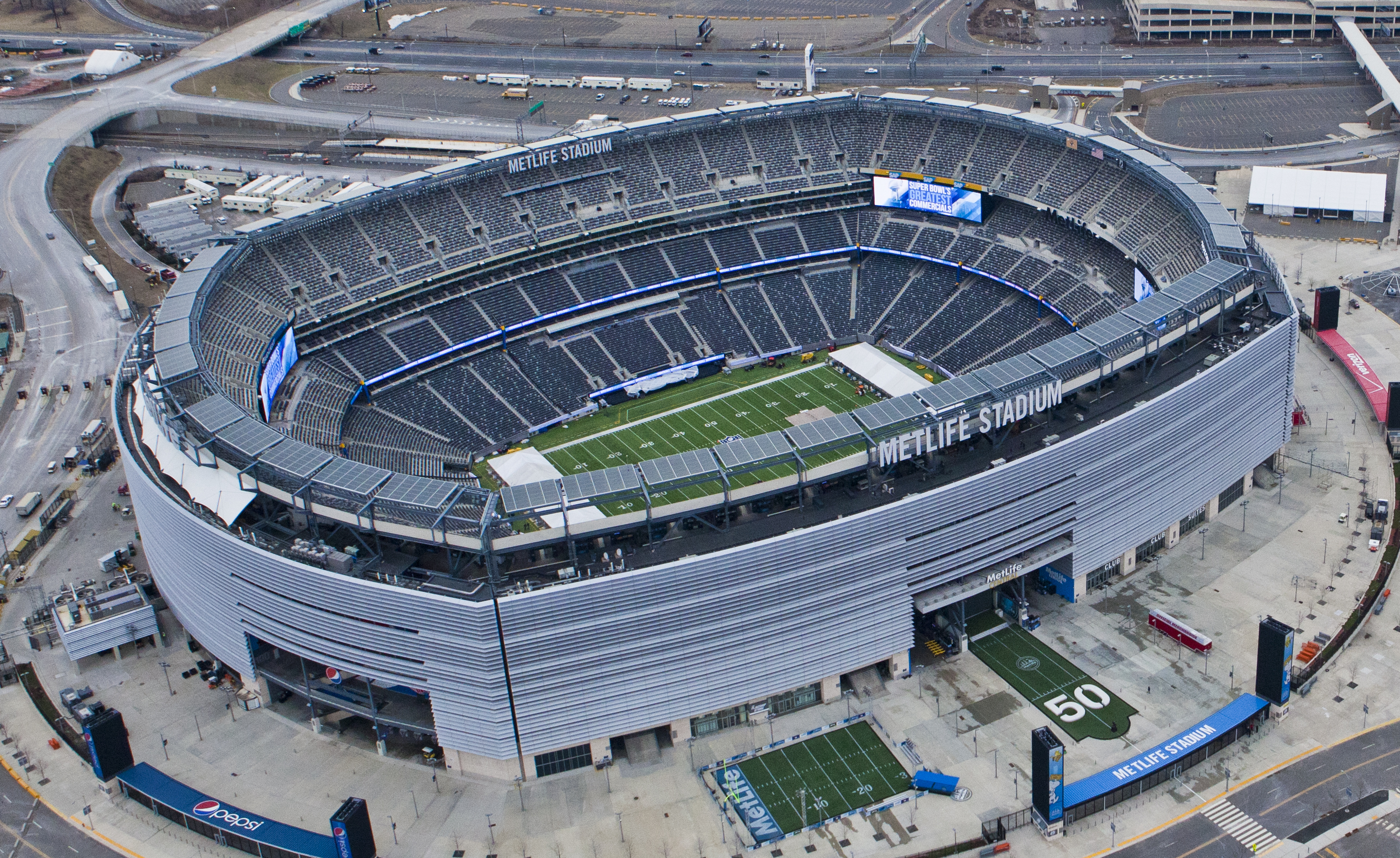
The 39th annual SummerSlam, and first to be two nights, was held at MetLife Stadium in East Rutherford, New Jersey.

SummerSlam is an annual professional wrestling premium live event (PLE) traditionally held in August by WWE since 1988. It was originally broadcast exclusively via pay-per-view (PPV) before it began simulcasting on WWE's livestreaming platforms in 2014. Dubbed "The Biggest Party of the Summer", it is one of the promotion's original four PPVs, along with WrestleMania, Royal Rumble, and Survivor Series, referred to as the "Big Four", and as of August 2021, it is considered one of the "Big Five", along with Money in the Bank. Out of the five, it is considered WWE's second biggest event of the year behind WrestleMania.

On September 26, 2024, in conjunction with the New Jersey Sports and Exposition Authority (NJSEA), WWE announced that the 38th SummerSlam would be held across two nights on Saturday, August 2, and Sunday, August 3, 2025, at MetLife Stadium in East Rutherford, New Jersey with a special start time of 6:00 p.m. Eastern Time (ET) for both nights. The event was in turn promoted as SummerSlam: New Jersey. MetLife Stadium previously hosted WrestleMania 29 in 2013 and WrestleMania 35 in 2019, and this was the fourth SummerSlam in East Rutherford, after the 1989, 1997, and 2007 events, which were all held at the Meadowlands Arena under the venue's previous names during those years. This would also be the first two-night SummerSlam, though WWE had originally announced that the event would expand to two nights beginning with the 2026 edition in Minneapolis. Previously, only WrestleMania had been held as a two-night PLE since WrestleMania 36 in 2020, originally done as a precaution due to the COVID-19 pandemic before becoming permanent with WrestleMania 37 the following year. The event featured wrestlers from the Raw and SmackDown brand divisions, with rapper Cardi B serving as the event's hostess.

To help secure the event, NJSEA committed US$7.125 million from New Jersey's allotment of federal funds under the American Rescue Plan Act of 2021 (ARP), specifically from a fund intended to provide aid to industries affected by the COVID-19 pandemic, including travel and tourism. NJSEA said it expected the event to generate $80 million in economic impact for the region. Bergen newspaper The Record reported that the $6.24 billion in total funds New Jersey received under the ARP had to be allocated by the end of 2024 and spent before the end of 2026, and noted there was "still money to be used".

During SummerSlam weekend, WWE partnered with independent wrestling promotion Game Changer Wrestling (GCW) to co-promote a WWE ID Showcase event on August 1 at The Williams Center in Rutherford, New Jersey, which saw the inaugural Men's WWE ID and Women's ID Champions crowned. WWE had also scheduled a comedy event called WWE Late Night, which was to be hosted by comedian Tony Hinchcliffe at the Bergen Performing Arts Center in Englewood, New Jersey after SummerSlam Saturday's conclusion; however, on July 25, ticket holders were notified that the event was cancelled and refunds would be issued.

=== Broadcast outlets ===
Both nights of SummerSlam were broadcast on traditional PPV outlets worldwide. They were also available to livestream on Peacock in the United States, SuperSport in Sub-Saharan Africa, Disney+ in the Philippines, Abema in Japan, Netflix in most other international markets, and the WWE Network in a select few countries that had not yet transferred to Netflix due to pre-existing contracts. This marked the first SummerSlam to livestream on Netflix following the WWE Network's merger under the service in January 2025 in those areas. WWE also partnered with Fandango to broadcast WWE's PLEs in select theaters across the United States, beginning with the 2025 SummerSlam, which was exclusive to select Regal Cinemas, with events after SummerSlam expanding to other theater chains.

=== Storylines ===
Night 1's card had seven matches, including one impromptu one, while Night 2 included six, for a total of 13 matches, which resulted from scripted storylines. Results were predetermined by WWE's writers on the Raw and SmackDown brands, while storylines were produced on WWE's weekly television programs, Monday Night Raw and Friday Night SmackDown.

==== Main event matches ====
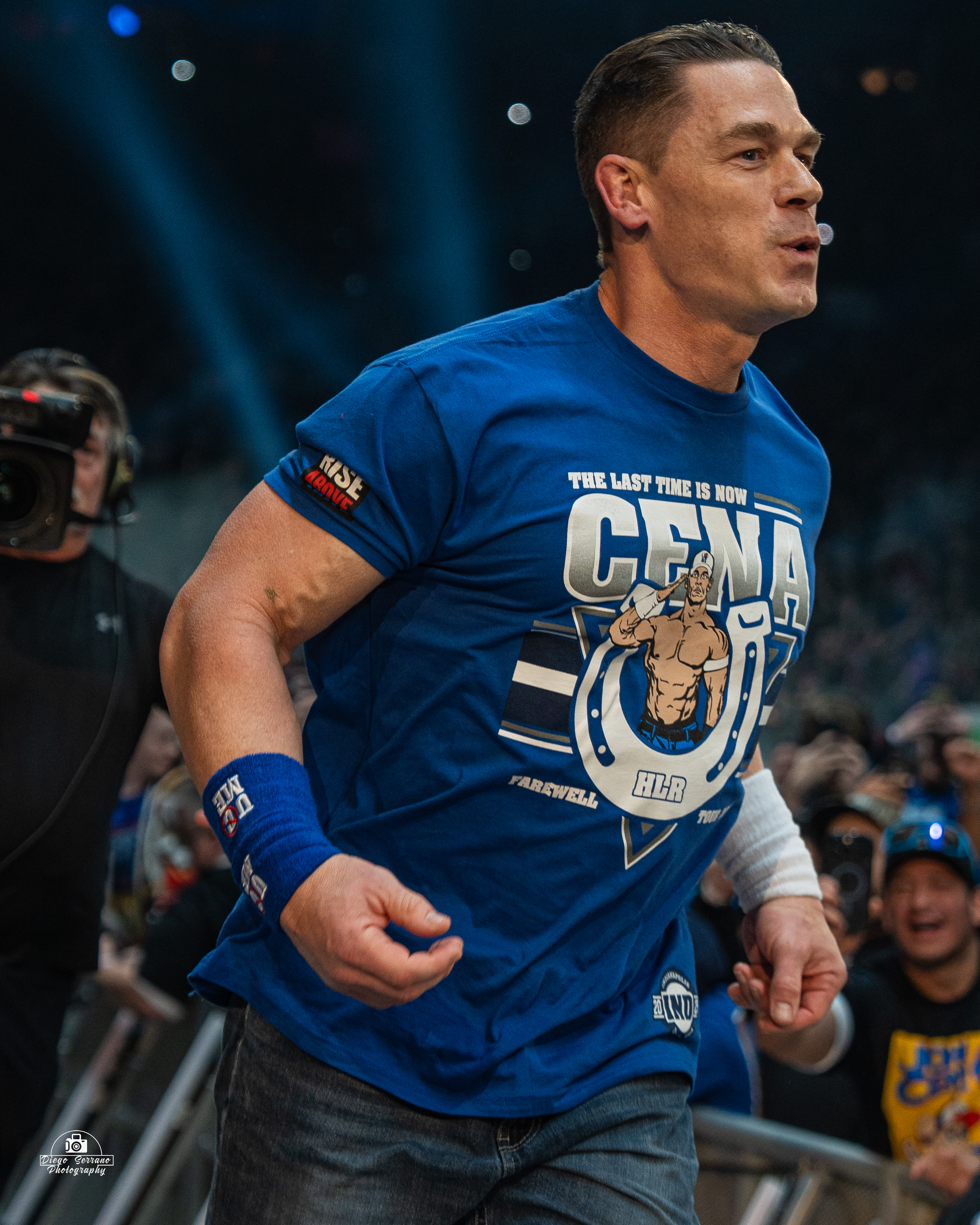
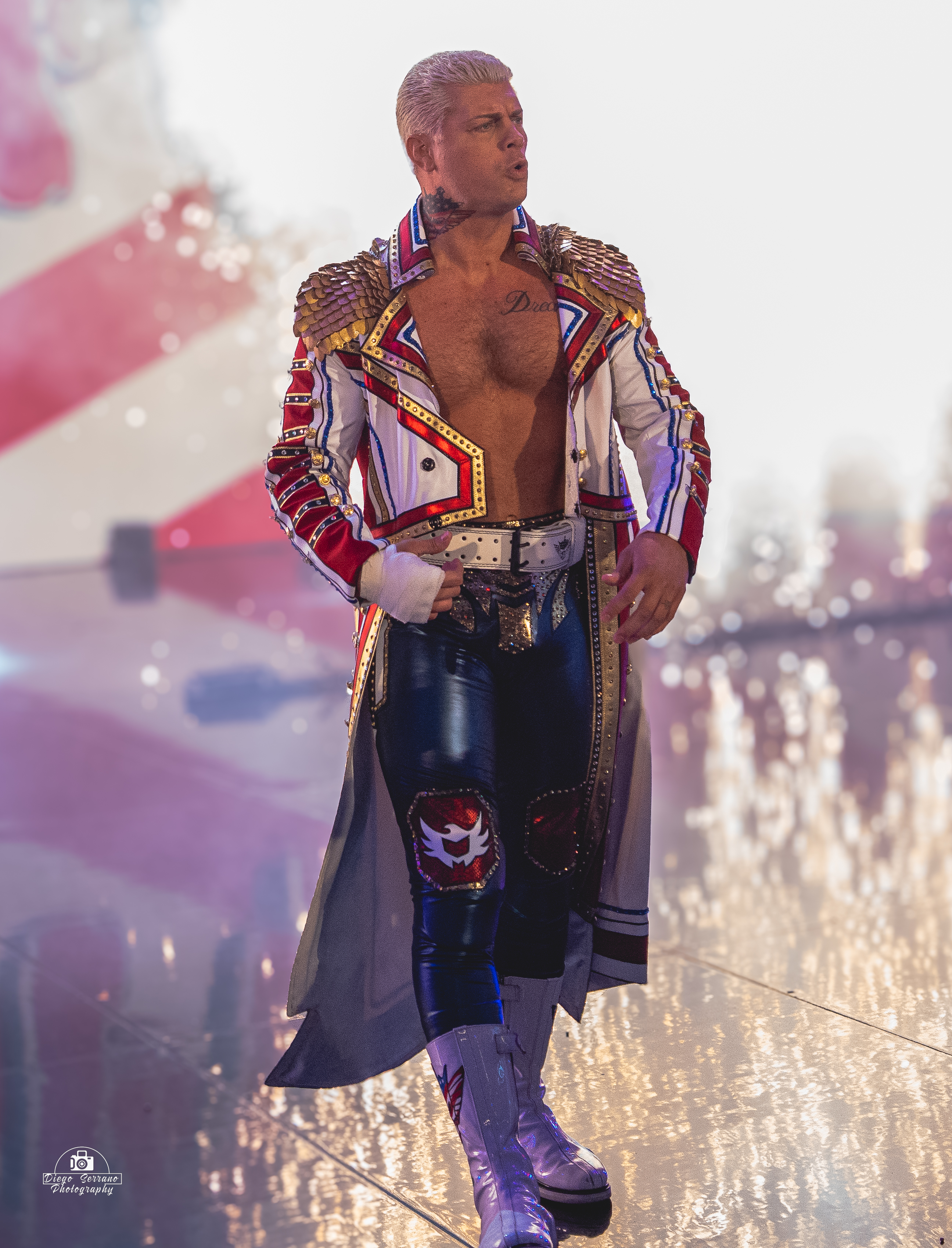
In his final match at a SummerSlam, John Cena defended SmackDown's Undisputed WWE Championship against 2025 King of the Ring winner Cody Rhodes in a Street Fight in the main event of Night 2.

At Night of Champions, the King and Queen of the Ring finals took place, with the winners receiving a match for the world championship of their respective brand at SummerSlam. The King of the Ring final was won by SmackDown's Cody Rhodes, while in the main event of Night of Champions, John Cena retained SmackDown's Undisputed WWE Championship; this confirmed that Rhodes would challenge Cena for the title at SummerSlam, setting up a rematch from the main event of Night 2 of WrestleMania 41 where Cena had controversially defeated Rhodes to win the title. During the contract signing on the July 18 episode of SmackDown, Cena feigned that he was not ready to defend the title and refused signing the contract so that he would not have to face Rhodes at SummerSlam, after which, a brawl ensued which ended with Rhodes forcing Cena to sign the contract and subsequently then revealed the fine print which was that their match would be a Street Fight. On the final SmackDown before SummerSlam, Cena seemingly turned face, stating that Rhodes's actions knocked sense into him and that he should have never turned heel.

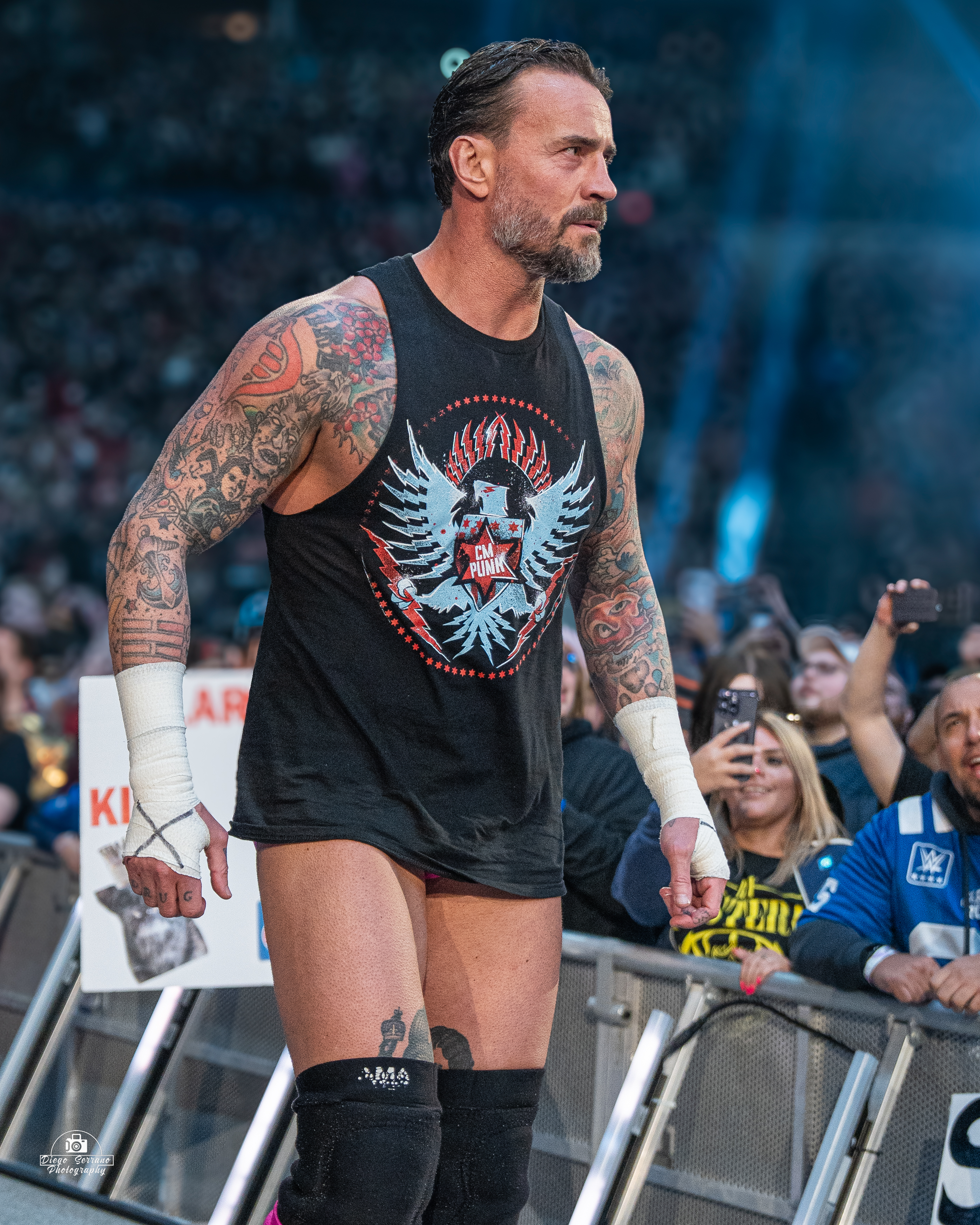
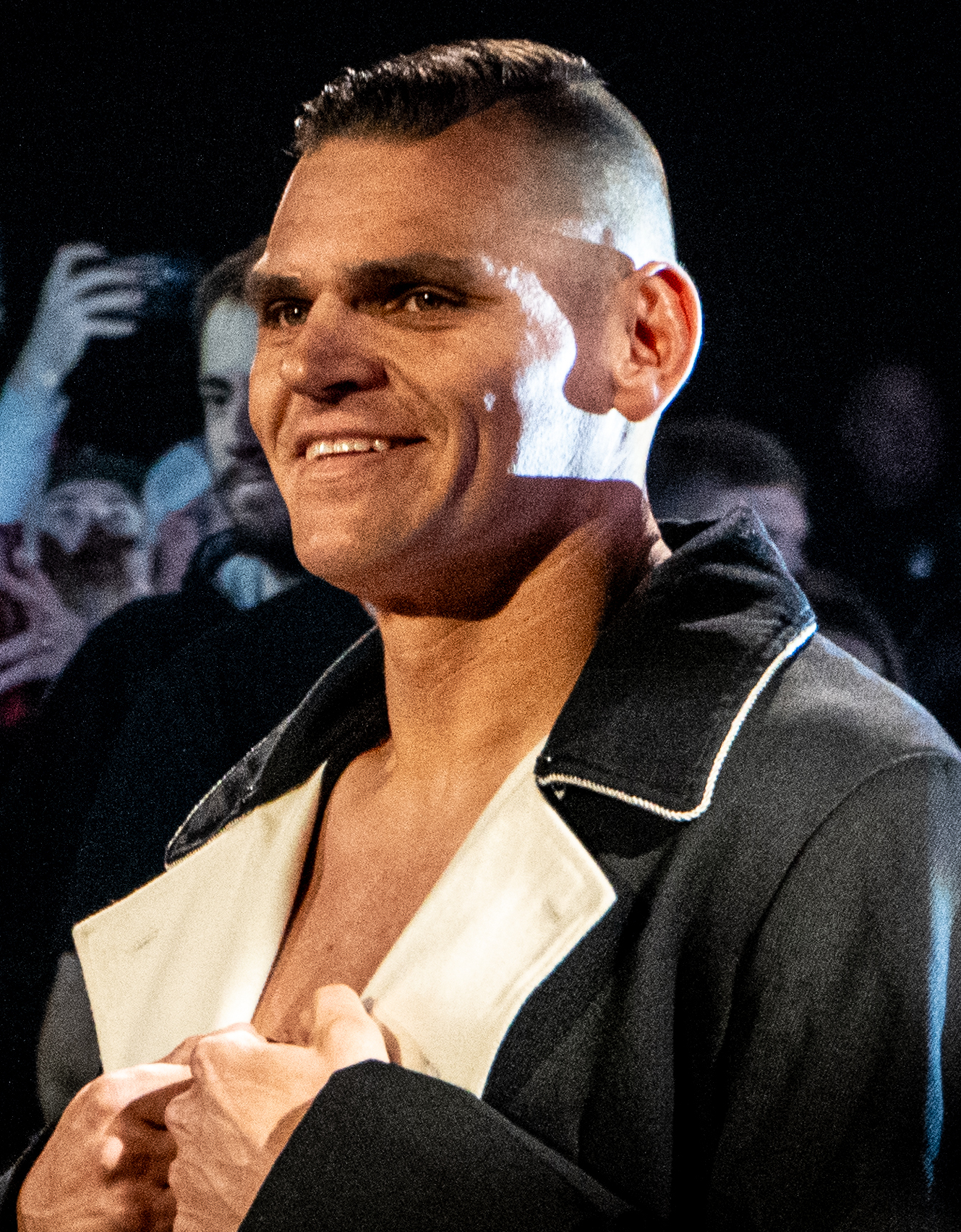
CM Punk challenged Gunther for Raw's World Heavyweight Championship in the main event of Night 1.

On the July 14 episode of Raw, a gauntlet match was held to determine the number one contender for the brand's World Heavyweight Championship against reigning champion Gunther at SummerSlam. The match was ultimately won by CM Punk, who vowed to win the championship at the event.

==== Undercard matches ====
The Queen of the Ring final at Night of Champions was won by SmackDown's Jade Cargill. Subsequently at Evolution the following month, Tiffany Stratton retained SmackDown's WWE Women's Championship, thus confirming that Cargill would challenge Stratton for the title at SummerSlam.

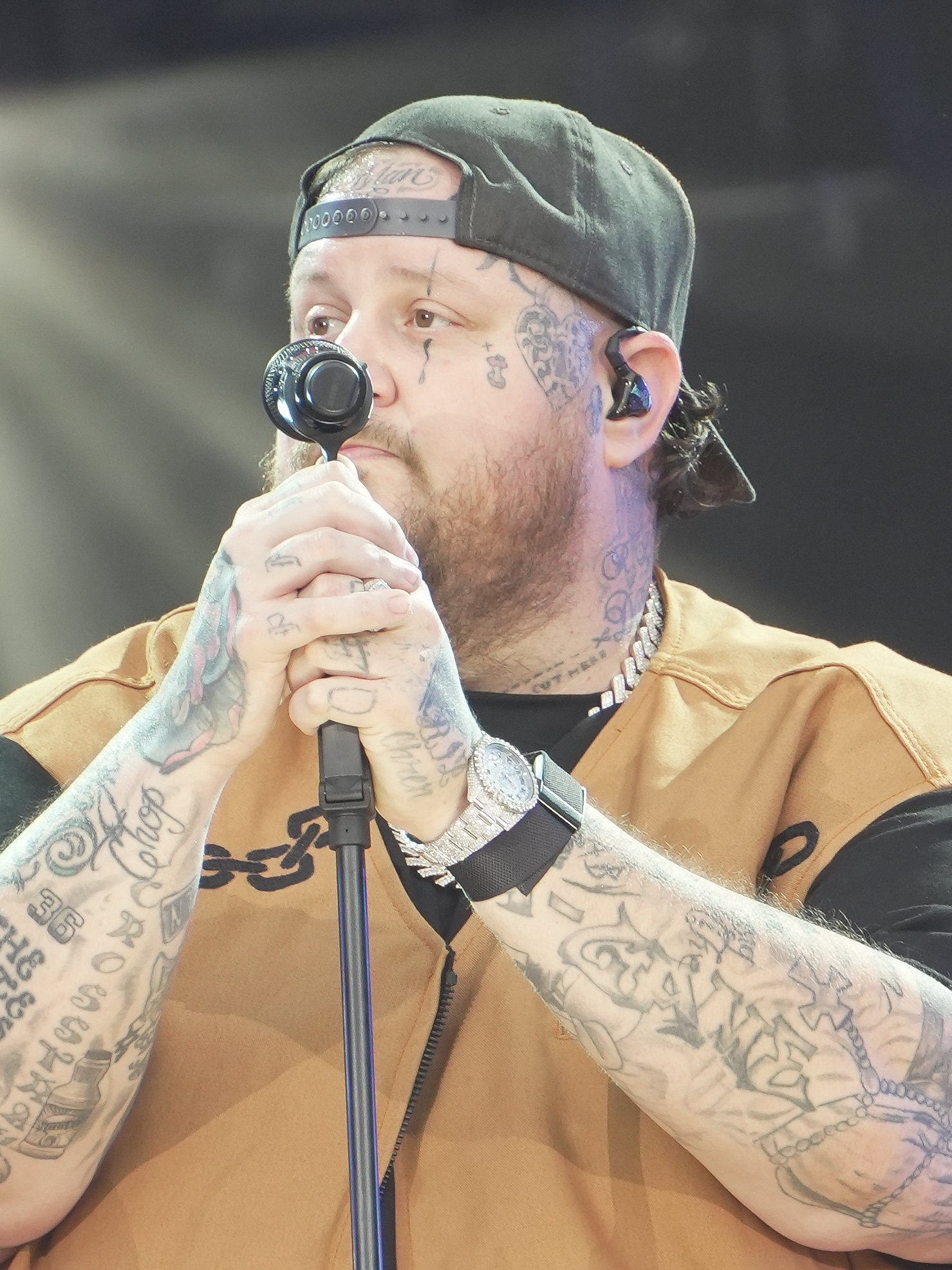
American country singer Jelly Roll made his professional wrestling in-ring debut when he teamed with Randy Orton against Drew McIntyre and Logan Paul in a tag team match.

On the July 4 episode of SmackDown, Drew McIntyre made a return in his first appearance since Saturday Night's Main Event XXXIX, interrupting Randy Orton and taunting him for not punting Cody Rhodes's head in the final of the King of the Ring tournament at Night of Champions, stating that the legend of Orton was dead; Orton responded by performing an RKO on McIntyre. On the following episode while country singer Jelly Roll was performing his song "Liar", he was interrupted by Logan Paul, who stated that no one wanted to see an outsider in WWE. Orton interrupted, demanding that Paul show respect to Jelly Roll. McIntyre appeared and performed a Claymore Kick on Orton. Paul then attacked Orton further only for Jelly Roll to intervene. Paul then dismantled Jelly Roll's music set. The next evening at Saturday Night's Main Event XL, Orton, who was accompanied by Jelly Roll, defeated McIntyre, who was accompanied by Paul. Following the match, Paul attacked Orton, which prompted Jelly Roll to attack Paul, only for McIntyre to attack Jelly Roll with a Claymore Kick. Later, Jelly Roll stated that he wanted both McIntyre and Paul in a match, with Orton suggesting that the match should take place at SummerSlam. It was subsequently confirmed that Jelly Roll and Orton would face McIntyre and Paul in a tag team match at the event.

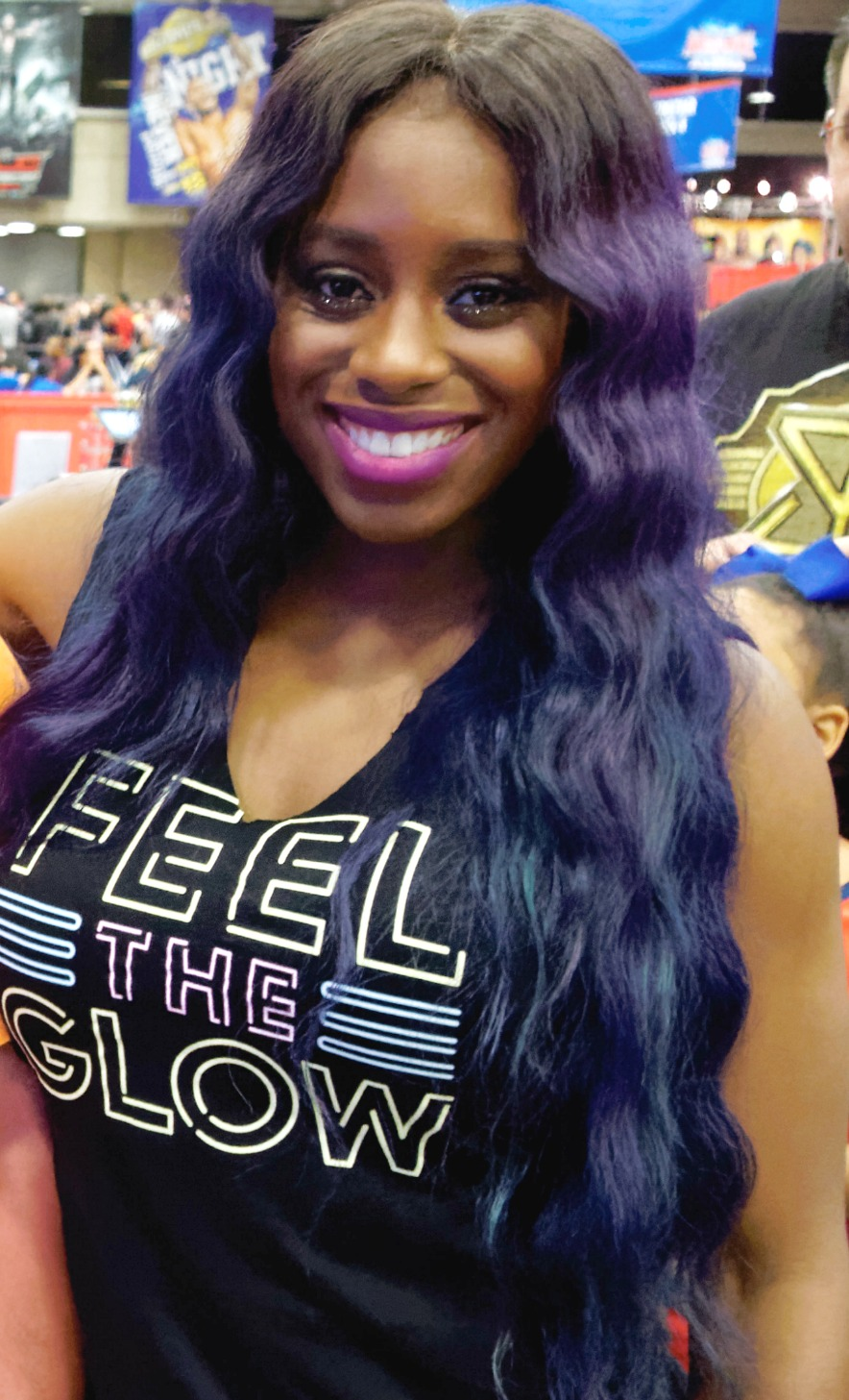
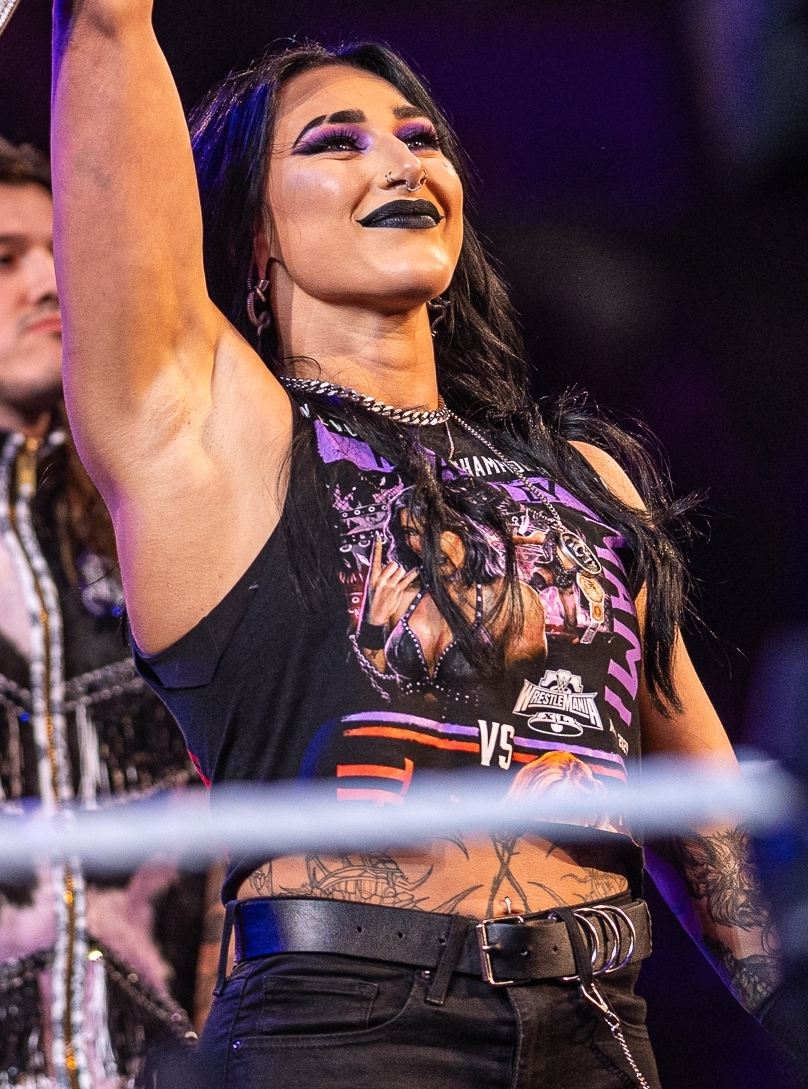
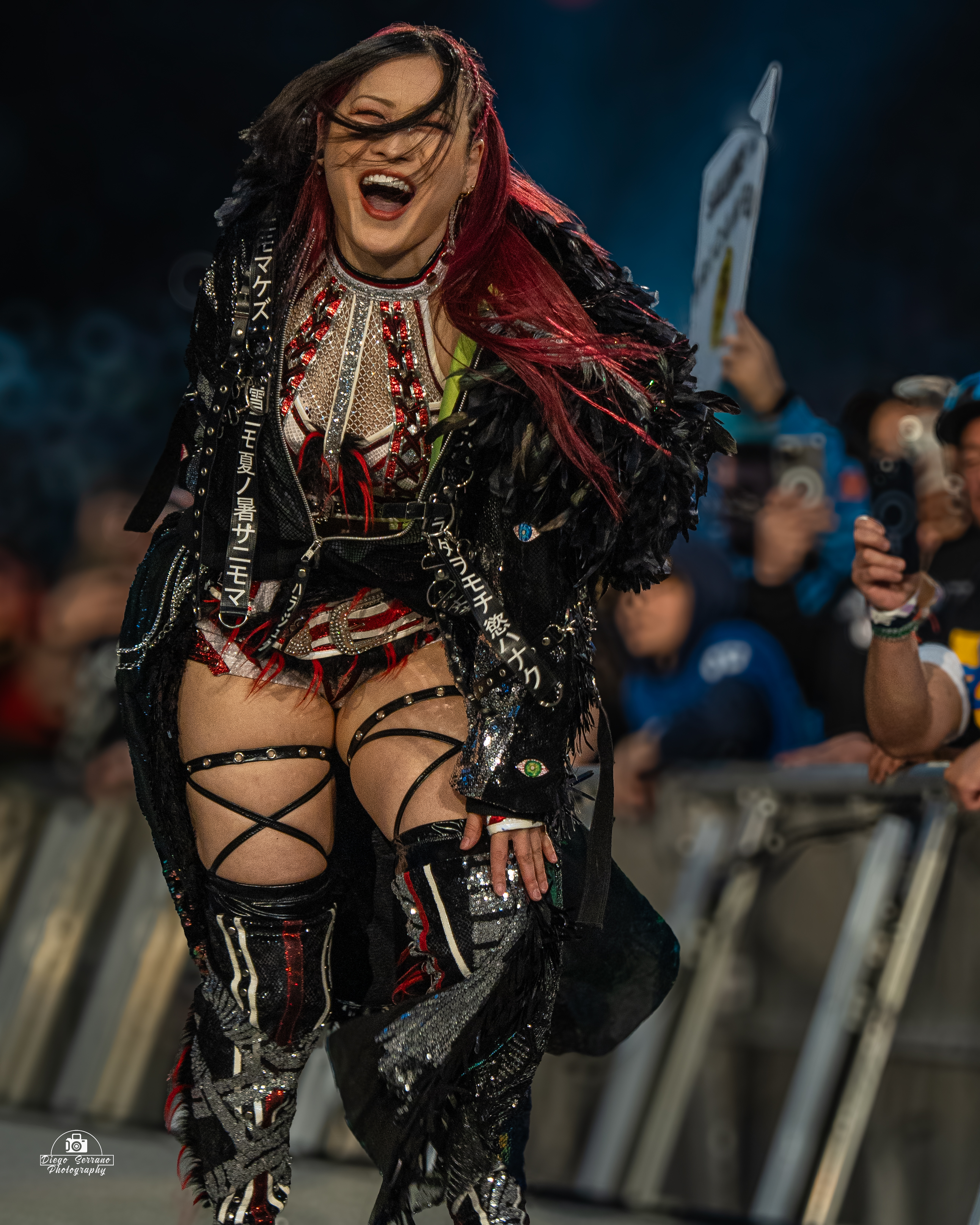
Naomi defended Raw's Women's World Championship against Rhea Ripley and Iyo Sky in a triple threat match in the opening match of Night 2.

At Evolution, SmackDown's Naomi cashed in her Money in the Bank contract during a singles match between champion Iyo Sky and Rhea Ripley, converting it into a triple threat match to win Raw's Women's World Championship; Naomi was subsequently transferred to the Raw brand. During Naomi's celebration on Raw the following night, both Sky and Ripley interrupted, wanting another title match. Raw General Manager Adam Pearce then announced that Naomi would defend the title against both Ripley and Sky in a triple threat match at SummerSlam.

At Evolution, Becky Lynch defeated Bayley and Lyra Valkyria to retain the WWE Women's Intercontinental Championship in a triple threat match. The next night on Raw, Valkyria defeated Bayley in a two out of three falls match to earn a rematch against Lynch for the title at SummerSlam. On the following episode, Lynch proposed for the match stipulation to be a Last Chance match in which Valkyria would never be able to challenge for the title again for as long as Lynch was champion, the same stipulation from Money In the Bank where Lynch had defeated Valkyria to win the title. Valkyria accepted and added that the match should be a No Disqualification, No Countout match to guarantee a winner, which Lynch accepted.

After failing to win the WWE Women's Championship at WrestleMania 41, Charlotte Flair was approached by former rival Alexa Bliss, who suggested the two form a tag team, with Flair declining several times before eventually agreeing. At Evolution, Bliss and Flair were part of a fatal four-way tag team match for the WWE Women's Tag Team Championship, where champions The Judgment Day (Raquel Rodriguez and Roxanne Perez) retained, although neither Bliss or Flair were pinned. On the following episode of SmackDown, Flair announced that after speaking with Raw General Manager Adam Pearce, who was filling in for SmackDown General Manager Nick Aldis that night, she and Bliss would face Rodriguez and Perez for the title at SummerSlam.

At Night of Champions, Solo Sikoa defeated Jacob Fatu to win the WWE United States Championship after interference from JC Mateo, a returning Tonga Loa, and a debuting Talla Tonga. On the July 4 episode of SmackDown, Fatu defeated Mateo and Sikoa in a tag team match, with Fatu pinning Sikoa. Two weeks later, Fatu was taken by police after an alleged involvement in a car accident involving Sikoa's group (kayfabe), however, later that night, Fatu returned. Following an altercation between Fatu and Sikoa's group, Raw General Manager Adam Pearce, who was filling in for SmackDown General Manager Nick Aldis that night, announced that Sikoa would defend the championship against Fatu in a Steel Cage match at SummerSlam. Sikoa in turn was taken by the police after allegedly faking the car accident.

Dominik Mysterio was originally scheduled to defend the WWE Intercontinental Championship against AJ Styles at Night of Champions; however, as a result of an (kayfabe) injury sustained by Mysterio, the match was postponed. Over the following weeks, Mysterio continued to avoid wrestling Styles, claiming that he was not medically cleared. However, on the July 14 episode of Raw, Raw General Manager Adam Pearce announced that on the following episode, Mysterio would be re-evaluated by the medical team, and if Mysterio was cleared to compete, he would defend the championship against Styles at SummerSlam. On the next episode, Mysterio continually evaded re-evaluation, however, Pearce stated that if Mysterio was not re-evaluated, he would be stripped of the Intercontinental Championship. Later, Mysterio attacked Styles before announcing that he was medically cleared to compete, confirming that he would defend the title against Styles at SummerSlam.

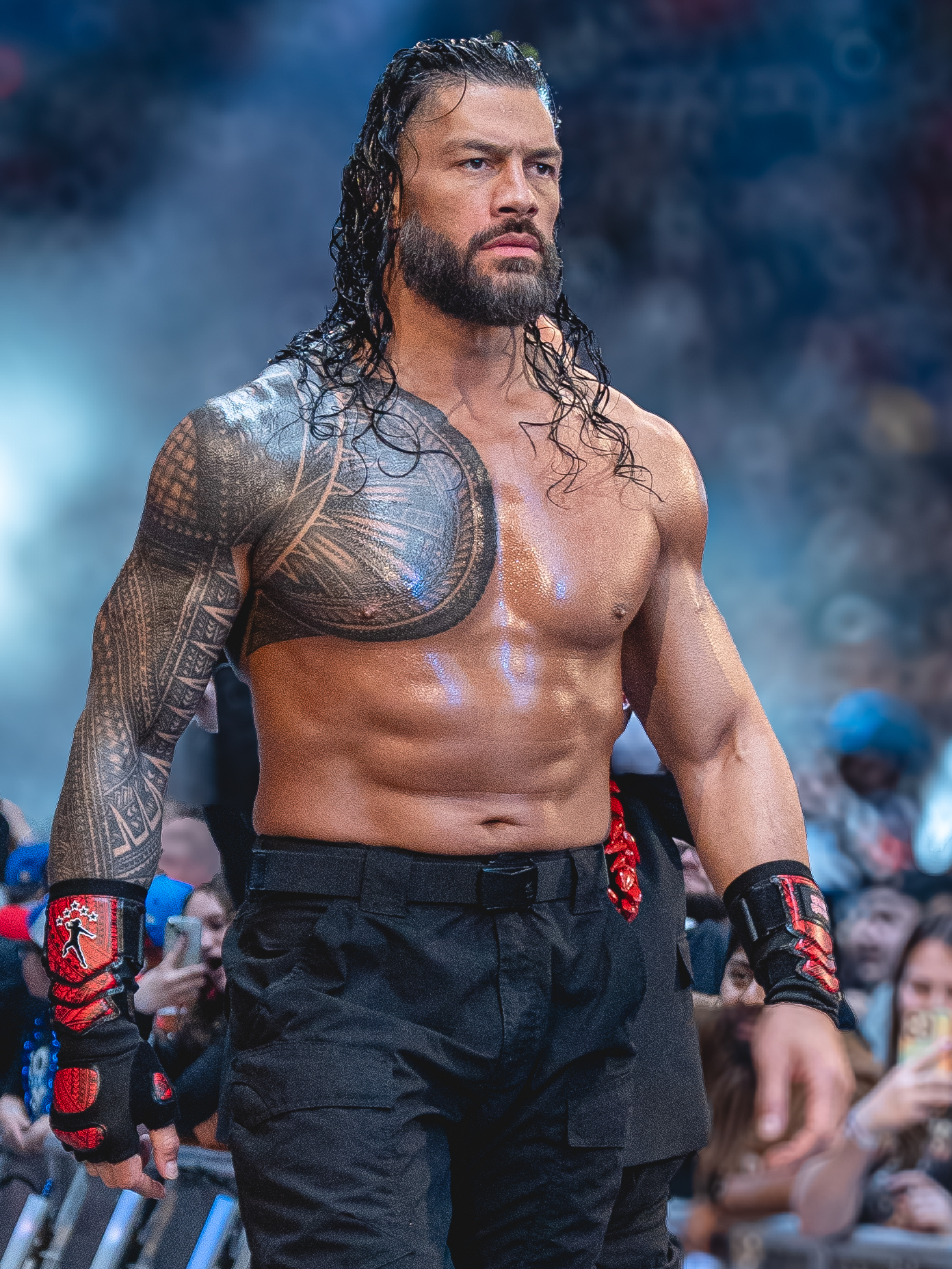
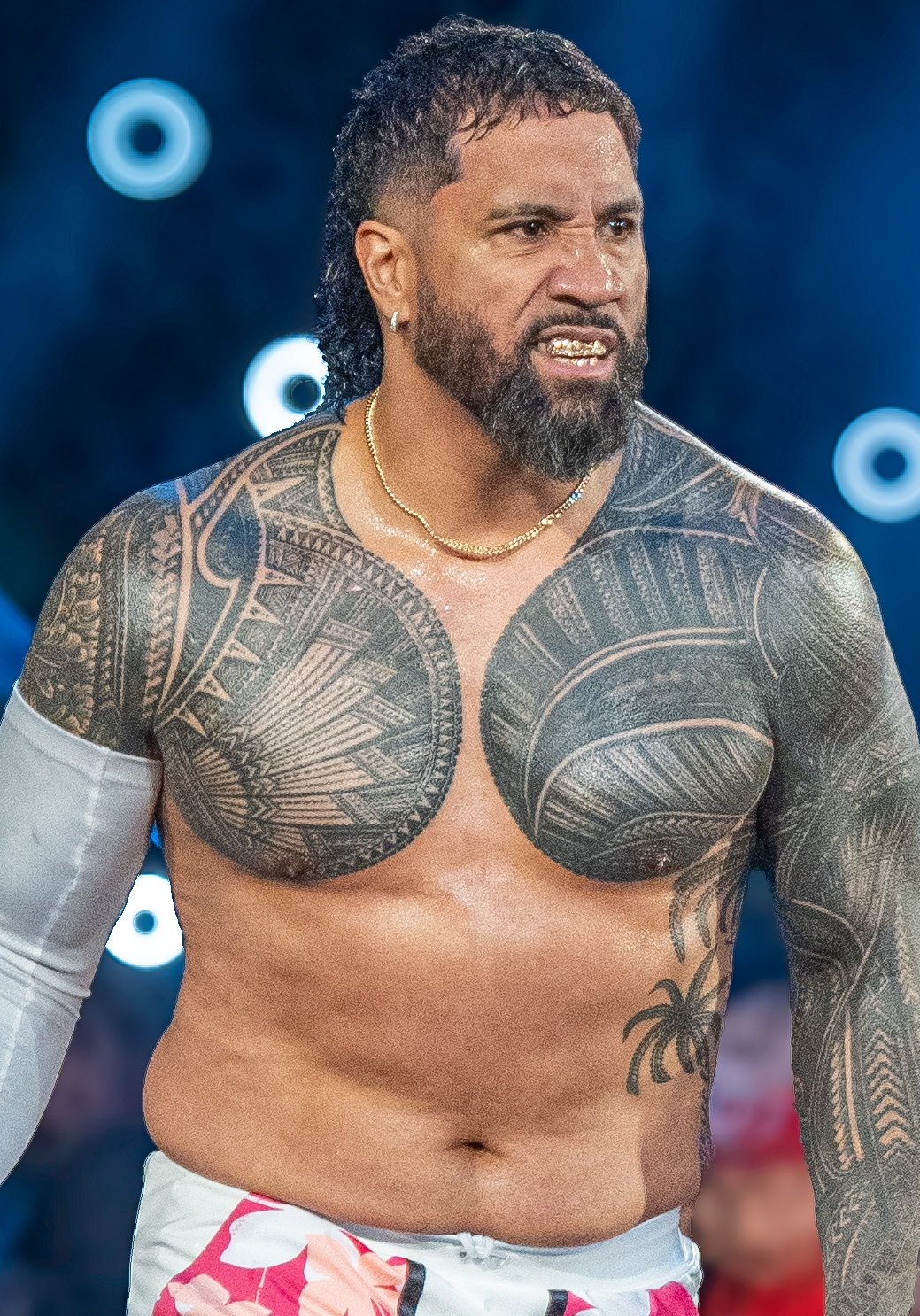
Cousins Roman Reigns and Jey Uso teamed up to take on Bron Breakker and Bronson Reed in a tag team match in the opening match of Night 1.

In the main event of Night 1 of WrestleMania 41, Roman Reigns's special counsel Paul Heyman accompanied his former client CM Punk to the ring as a favor for Punk teaming with Reigns at Survivor Series: WarGames in November 2024, much to Reigns's dismay. However, Heyman betrayed both Reigns and Punk, siding with Seth Rollins and assisted Rollins in winning the match. On the following episode of Raw, Bron Breakker was added to Rollins's alliance and attacked Reigns, with him subsequently taking a hiatus over the next couple of months, during which Bronson Reed, who had been on the losing team against Reigns and Punk's team at Survivor Series: WarGames, was also added to Rollins's alliance. Rollins, however, suffered a knee injury at Saturday Night's Main Event XL on July 12. On the July 14 episode of Raw, Breakker and Reed attacked Punk and Reigns's cousin Jey Uso after their gauntlet match, however, Reigns returned from hiatus and attacked Reed and Breakker. The following week, Reigns chastised Heyman for his betrayal, only to be attacked by Breakker and Reed. However, Uso appeared and assisted Reigns. In a video message posted on X on July 22, Reigns proposed a tag team match with himself and Uso against Breakker and Reed at SummerSlam. Uso subsequently accepted and the match was made official.

Since early 2025, Karrion Kross had been playing mind games with Sami Zayn, believing that Zayn was a liar and not the good guy he portrayed himself to be due to Zayn's past as a heel. This came to a head at Night of Champions where Zayn defeated Kross. On the following episode of Raw, Kross attacked Zayn with a pipe, which costed Zayn a tag team match later that night. The following week, Kross further targeted Zayn and attempted to once again strike Zayn with the pipe, however, he was stopped by Raw General Manager Adam Pearce and some WWE personnel. This in turn cost Zayn another match. Kross then defeated Zayn on the July 21 episode after striking Zayn with the pipe once again. On July 25 during a SummerSlam card reveal event, it was announced that they would have a rematch at SummerSlam. On the final Raw before SummerSlam, both agreed that if Kross won, Zayn would have to admit that Kross was right about Zayn, but if Zayn won, Kross would have to admit that he was wrong about Zayn.

On the May 23 episode of SmackDown, The Wyatt Sicks (Uncle Howdy, Dexter Lumis, Erick Rowan, Joe Gacy, and Nikki Cross) made a surprise return after being on hiatus since December 2024, attacking both Fraxiom (Axiom and Nathan Frazer) and WWE Tag Team Champions The Street Profits (Angelo Dawkins and Montez Ford) during their championship defense, ending the match in a no-contest. The following week, The Wyatt Sicks continued to target the tag team division, again attacking Fraxiom and The Street Profits, as well as Motor City Machine Guns (Alex Shelley and Chris Sabin) and #DIY (Johnny Gargano and Tommaso Ciampa). Lumis and Gacy then defeated Motor City Machine Guns on the June 13 episode, and proceeded to a match for the title two weeks later, which ended in a no-contest after the aforementioned teams and Los Garzas (Angel and Berto) interfered. On the July 4 episode, The Wyatt Sicks defeated Ford, Gargano, Sabin, and Berto in an eight-man tag team match, earning another championship match the following week, where Lumis and Gacy defeated The Street Profits to win the title, much to the dismay of the other teams, who wanted to prevent the championship from going to The Wyatt Sicks. The following week, the newly formed tag team of Andrade and Rey Fenix defeated #DIY, Motor City Machine Guns, and Fraxiom to become the number one contenders the following week, where the match ended in a no-contest after Cross pulled the referee out of the ring during a pin. After a brawl between The Wyatt Sicks, Andrade and Fénix, #DIY, Fraxiom, Motor City Machine Guns, and The Street Profits, SmackDown General Manager Nick Aldis announced that The Wyatt Sicks would defend the WWE Tag Team Championship against the five other teams in a Six-Pack Tables, Ladders, and Chairs match at SummerSlam.

== Event ==
=== Night 1 ===
Other on-screen personnel – Saturday
Role:	Name:
Host	Cardi B
English commentators	Michael Cole
English commentators	Wade Barrett
Spanish commentators	Marcelo Rodríguez
Spanish commentators	Jerry Soto
Ring announcer	Alicia Taylor
Referees	Shawn Bennett
Referees	Jessika Carr
Referees	Daphanie LaShaunn
Referees	Chad Patton
Referees	Ryan Tran
Referees	Rod Zapata
Interviewers	Cathy Kelley
Interviewers	Byron Saxton
Pre-show panel	Michael Cole
Pre-show panel	Wade Barrett
Pre-show panel	Jackie Redmond
Pre-show panel	Joe Tessitore
Pre-show panel	Big E
Pre-show panel	Peter Rosenberg

==== Preliminary matches ====
SummerSlam Saturday began with singer and rapper Breland singing "God Bless America". Hostess Cardi B then welcomed and hyped up the fans for the event.

Night 1 began with Roman Reigns and Jey Uso taking on Bron Breakker and Bronson Reed (accompanied by Paul Heyman). During the match. Reed and Breakker dominated Reigns and Uso. Later in the match, as Reed attempted a Tsunami, Reigns performed a Superman Punch on Reed. Reigns and Uso performed a 1D on Reed, only for Breakker to break up the pin attempt. In the end, as Breakker attempted a Spear on Uso, Reigns shoved Uso aside and received the Spear instead. Uso then performed a superkick on Breakker and then performed a Spear and an Uso Splash on Reed to win the match.

Next, Raquel Rodriguez and Roxanne Perez defended the WWE Women's Tag Team Championship against Alexa Bliss and Charlotte Flair. During the match, as Flair applied the Figure Eight Leglock on Rodriguez, Bliss attempted to attack Rodriguez, who evaded Bliss, causing Bliss to accidentally strike Flair. In the closing moments, Flair performed a big boot on Rodriguez and Bliss performed a Sister Abigail DDT on Perez to win the title.

After that, Sami Zayn took on Karrion Kross (accompanied by Scarlett). During the match, Zayn performed a Blue Thunder Bomb on Kross. Scarlett tossed a pipe at Zayn's feet and a conflicted Zayn grabbed it, ready to strike Kross with it, however, Zayn refused and Kross rolled up Zayn for a nearfall. In the closing moments, Zayn then performed an Exploder Suplex and a Helluva Kick on Kross to win the match. This was the final WWE appearance for both Kross and Scarlett before their contracts expired on August 11.

In the fourth match, Tiffany Stratton defended the WWE Women's Championship against Jade Cargill. During the match, Cargill performed Jaded on Stratton, who placed her foot on the middle rope to void the pin attempt. In the end, as Cargill attempted Jaded from the middle rope, Stratton countered and performed the Prettiest Moonsault Ever on Cargill to retain the title.

In the penultimate match, Jelly Roll and Randy Orton took on Drew McIntyre and Logan Paul. During the match, Paul performed a Frog Splash on Jelly Roll through the announce table. In the end, Orton performed an RKO on McIntyre, only for Paul to send Orton into the ringpost. Paul performed a Frog Splash on Jelly Roll to win the match.

==== Main event ====
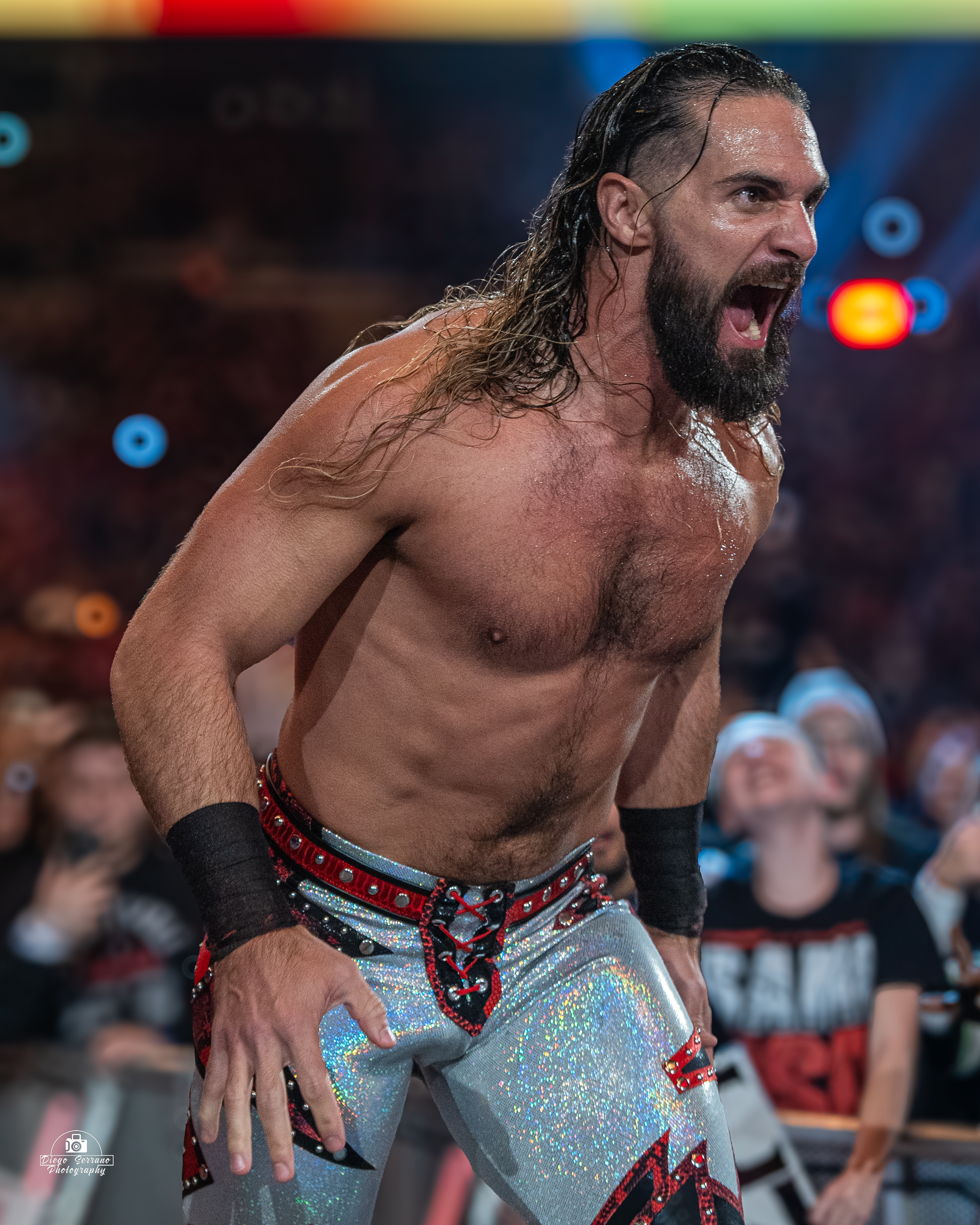
Seth Rollins cashed-in the Money in the Bank contract after the main event to become a two-time World Heavyweight Champion.

In the main event, Gunther defended the World Heavyweight Championship against CM Punk. During the match, as Punk attempted a top-rope elbow drop, Gunther performed a chop on Punk and performed a top-rope splash on Punk for a nearfall. As Punk attempted a Go To Sleep, Gunther countered and performed a powerbomb, a dropkick, and another powerbomb on Punk for a nearfall. At ringside, while Gunther was perched atop the announce table and played to the crowd, Punk tripped Gunther off the announce table causing Gunther to bleed. Back in the ring, as Punk attempted a Go To Sleep, Gunther countered into a sleeper hold who escaped. In the closing moments, Punk escaped the submission and performed the Go To Sleep twice on Gunther to win the title.

Following the match, Money in the Bank contract holder Seth Rollins, sporting crutches and a brace on his right knee, arrived with Paul Heyman and sent a warning shot to Punk. Rollins turned around to exit the stage and paused momentarily before dropping his crutches and removing his brace, thus revealing that he was faking his injury, grabbing his briefcase from Heyman, and running to the ring. As Punk attempted a Go To Sleep, Rollins countered and attacked Punk with the briefcase. Rollins then cashed in his Money in the Bank contract and performed a Stomp on Punk to win the title. Rollins then celebrated with Heyman, Bron Breakker, and Bronson Reed. Post-match, the commentators described Rollins' cash-in as "the ruse of the century". Punk's reign lasted five minutes and nine seconds.

=== Night 2 ===
Other on-screen personnel – Sunday
Role:	Name:
English commentators	Michael Cole
English commentators	Wade Barrett
Spanish commentators	Marcelo Rodríguez
Spanish commentators	Jerry Soto
Ring announcer	Alicia Taylor
Referees	Danilo Anfibio
Referees	Jessika Carr
Referees	Dan Engler
Referees	Daphanie LaShaunn
Referees	Eddie Orengo
Referees	Ryan Tran
Interviewers	Cathy Kelley
Interviewers	Byron Saxton
Pre-show panel	Michael Cole
Pre-show panel	Wade Barrett
Pre-show panel	Jackie Redmond
Pre-show panel	Joe Tessitore
Pre-show panel	Big E
Pre-show panel	Peter Rosenberg

==== Preliminary matches ====
Country music duo Tigirlily Gold kicked off SummerSlam Sunday by singing "God Bless America". Triple H then arrived, hyping up the crowd for the event.

Night 2 began with Naomi defending the Women's World Championship against Rhea Ripley and Iyo Sky in a triple threat match. During the match, Sky performed a 619 on Naomi followed by a German Suplex by Ripley. As Ripley positioned Sky onto her shoulders, Sky countered into a poisonrana, which Naomi broke up. Ripley performed Razor's Edge and a powerbomb on Sky only for Naomi to pull Ripley out of the ring. Sky then performed a moonsault on Naomi and Ripley. Ripley performed Riptide on Naomi, however, Sky broke up the pin attempt. In the end, as Ripley performed an Avalanche Riptide on Sky, Naomi caught Ripley with a roll-up to retain the title.

Next, The Wyatt Sicks (Dexter Lumis and Joe Gacy) defend SmackDown's WWE Tag Team Championship against The Street Profits (Angelo Dawkins and Montez Ford), #DIY (Johnny Gargano and Tommaso Ciampa), The Motor City Machine Guns (Alex Shelley and Chris Sabin), Fraxiom (Nathan Frazer and Axiom), and Andrade and Rey Fénix in a TLC match. Throughout the match, there were various table and ladder crashes, and involvement from Candice LeRae, B-Fab, Nikki Cross, Erick Rowan, and Uncle Howdy. In the end, as Fénix ascended a ladder, Lumis struck Fenix with a chair, and he and Gacy performed a suplex-powerbomb combo on Fénix. Gacy then ascended the ladder and unhooked the belts to retain. This would be Andrade's last match in WWE as on September 13, he departed the company.

After that, Becky Lynch defended the Women's Intercontinental Championship against Lyra Valkyria in a no disqualification, no countout match. During the match, Lynch tied Valkyria's hands together with a ziptie. Valkyria went under the ring to free her hands from the ziptie. As Lynch attempted a Manhandle Slam on Valkyria from the steps, Valkyria countered into Nightwing. Inside the ring, Lynch performed a Manhandle Slam on Valkyria through two chairs for a nearfall. As Lynch attempted to strike Valkyria with a crowbar, Bayley appeared and snatched the crowbar away from Lynch. Lynch then told a conflicted Bayley to strike Valkyria with the crowbar, however, Bayley refused. Bayley and Lynch fought each other at ringside which saw Lynch take Bayley out and Valkyria performed a diving leg drop on Lynch through a table. In the end, as Bayley attempted to strike Lynch with a chain, Bayley struck Valkyria instead. Lynch performed a Manhandle Slam on Valkyria to retain the title, barring Valkyria from challenging for the title while Lynch was the champion.

In the fourth match, Solo Sikoa defended SmackDown's United States Championship against Jacob Fatu in a Steel Cage match. Fatu performed a double-jump top rope moonsault on Sikoa twice for a nearfall. Tonga Loa, JC Mateo, and Talla Tonga then arrived to surround the cage. Jimmy Uso then performed superkicks on Loa and Mateo before Talla sent him over the announce table. Sikoa performed a Samoan Spike on Fatu for a nearfall. In the end, Talla handcuffed Fatu to the cage, but Fatu broke out. As Fatu prevented Sikoa from escaping, Talla kicked the door into Fatu's head, allowing Sikoa to escape the cage and retain the title.

In the penultimate match, Dominik Mysterio defended Raw's Intercontinental Championship against AJ Styles. Styles attempted a Frog Splash, but Mysterio got his knees up. Styles applied a Calf Crusher on Mysterio, who grabbed the ropes to break the submission. As Mysterio tossed a chair to Styles before falling, the referee was about to end the match, but Styles and Mysterio got up. In the end, as Styles applied a Calf Crusher, Mysterio escaped when his boot came loose. Mysterio then hit Styles with the boot and pinned him with a Frog Splash to retain the title.

Before the main event, Stephanie McMahon arrived to announce Night 2's attendance as 60,561.

==== Main event ====
In the main event, John Cena defended the Undisputed WWE Championship against Cody Rhodes in a Street Fight. Cena and Rhodes embraced before fighting. Cena grabbed a crutch from Indiana Pacers point guard Tyrese Haliburton and struck Rhodes with it. Cena attempted an Attitude Adjustment, but Rhodes countered and slammed Cena onto the steps. Cena and Rhodes then attacked each other with chairs. Cena attempted an Attitude Adjustment, but Rhodes countered and performed a Cody Cutter on Cena for a nearfall. Cena performed an Attitude Adjustment on Rhodes, who fired back with a moonsault and a Disaster Kick, all resulting in nearfalls. Rhodes performed another Cody Cutter, Cena performed an electric chair drop, and Rhodes performed a piledriver, which resulted in nearfalls. Cena then performed an Attitude Adjustment on Rhodes. Cena applied the STF on Rhodes, who crawled out of the ring to escape. Cena struck Rhodes in the head with a microphone and performed Code Red on the floor. Cena performed an Attitude Adjustment on Rhodes through an announce table for a nearfall. Rhodes performed Cross Rhodes on Cena for a nearfall. Cena performed a diving leg drop and an Attitude Adjustment on Rhodes for a nearfall. Cena grabbed a table from under the ring, but Rhodes performed a DDT on Cena.

Cena and Rhodes then fought through the crowd and under the stage. Cena emerged from the stage through the elevator Rhodes used for his entrance, carrying Rhodes on his shoulders and delivered an Attitude Adjustment before carrying him once more to the ring. Rhodes sent Cena through the table and performed Cross Rhodes for a nearfall. Rhodes struck Cena in the head with a steel chair and an exposed turnbuckle pad. Cena applied the STF on Rhodes, this time wrapping the rope around Rhodes's neck, but Rhodes wrapped the rope around Cena's head. Cena escaped and attempted an Attitude Adjustment, but Rhodes countered and performed Cross Rhodes three times for a nearfall. Rhodes attempted to strike Cena with the title belt, but Cena ducked and performed the Attitude Adjustment twice before tossing the title aside and performing an Avalanche Attitude Adjustment on Rhodes for a nearfall. In the end, as Cena attempted an Avalanche Attitude Adjustment on Rhodes through a table, Rhodes countered and performed a Cody Cutter through a table. As Cena struggled to stand, Rhodes saluted Cena and then pinned him following Cross Rhodes to win the title.

After the match, Cena picked up the title and handed it to Rhodes, and the two embraced, solidifying Cena's face turn. Rhodes left the ring to let Cena thank the fans. Brock Lesnar then returned for the first time since SummerSlam in August 2023. Cena attempted a clothesline on Lesnar, who ducked and countered with an F-5.

== Reception ==
The event received mostly positive reviews, with the main events of both nights being universally acclaimed. Shakiel Mahjouri of CBS Sports gave the main event of Night 1 a grade of A, remarking that "the talented wrestlers evoked an old school match rife with psychology, chain wrestling and rugged strikes", He called it "the best match by a mile on a mostly stale card" and that "Punk and Gunther executed a slow burn with a great finish". Talking about Seth Rollins's Money in the Bank cash-in, he said that he was "mixed" on its execution, but stated that "Rollins did a fantastic job faking his injury" and that the cash-in "wasn't a shocker by any stretch, but a dramatic conclusion to SummerSlam Night 1 and an important commitment to Rollins' push". John Canton of TJR Wrestling gave it a rating of four stars out of five, and wrote in his review "I liked the match quite a bit. I wouldn’t call it a Match of the Year or anything like that, but a four-star main event is nice to see", and that "from a storytelling standpoint, I thought they did an excellent job". He called the cash-in "something that a lot of us expected" and that "they played it perfectly, and it worked". Overall, he rated SummerSlam Saturday 7.5 out of 10.

Reviewing the main event of Night 2, Erik Beaston of Bleacher Report graded the match an A+, analysing it as "an all-timer; a Match of the Year candidate that ranks as one of the best in either man's long lineage of excellence". Beaston called it "Cena's best performance since his series of matches against AJ Styles in 2016-17 and was on a par with Rhodes' recent classics against Reigns and Styles". Pro Wrestling Torch's Wade Keller called it "way above expectations" and "a strong performance from Cena and Cody". Jason Powell of Pro Wrestling Dot Net wrote "[Cena] worked hard and put together a hell of a brawl with Cody" and "it was much better than I anticipated". Brent Brookhouse of CBS Sports graded it a B, saying that "it was a good match for Cena and was far, far better than their disaster of a match at WrestleMania". Canton rated the match five stars out of five, stating that "it was an excellent match that was easily Cena's best singles match this year". He said that "this was a classic Cena PLE main event match and to John's credit, he put on an epic performance", and that "Cody winning was the right call because it was great to see Cena as a 17-time WWE World Champion, but I felt like he should lose the title before retiring and putting the title back on Cody makes a lot of sense". Overall, Canton rated SummerSlam Sunday 8.5 out of 10.

Writing for the Wrestling Observer Newsletter for Night 1, professional wrestling journalist Dave Meltzer rated Roman Reigns and Jey Uso vs. Bron Breakker and Bronson Reed four stars, the WWE Women's Tag Team Championship match three stars, Sami Zayn vs. Karrion Kross 1.5 stars (the lowest rated match across both nights), the WWE Women's Championship match two stars, Randy Orton and Jelly Roll vs. Drew McIntyre and Logan Paul 3.75 stars, and the World Heavyweight Championship bout between Gunther and CM Punk 4.5 stars. For Night 2, he rated the Women's World Championship triple threat match four stars, the WWE Tag Team Championship Six-Pack TLC match 4.75 stars, the Women's Intercontinental Championship match 3.75 stars, the United States Championship Steel Cage match two stars, the Intercontinental Championship match 2.75 stars, and lastly, the Undisputed WWE Championship Street Fight main event between John Cena and Cody Rhodes five stars, the highest rated match of the event.

=== Brock Lesnar return controversy ===
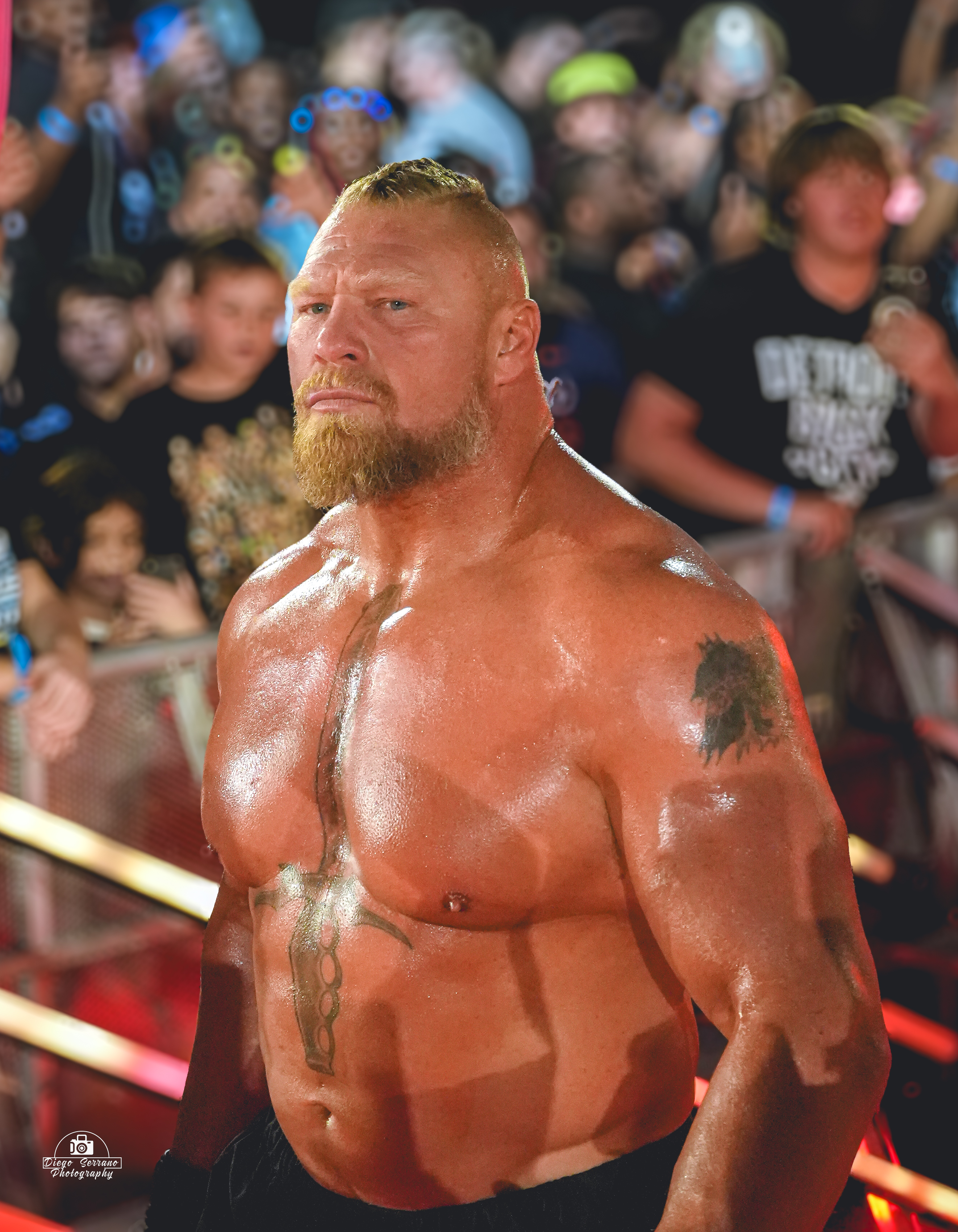
The return of Brock Lesnar from hiatus was a subject of intense controversy due to his involvement in the Vince McMahon sex trafficking scandal.

The return of Brock Lesnar caused controversy, as he had been on hiatus from WWE since SummerSlam in 2023 after he was named in the Vince McMahon sex trafficking scandal. Dave Meltzer of the Wrestling Observer Newsletter revealed that Lesnar had been cleared to return in the weeks leading up to the event and that his return is why a post-show press conference was not held. Chief content officer Paul "Triple H" Levesque stated that a feud with Lesnar was John Cena's "wish", although this was disputed by Meltzer and fellow journalist Bryan Alvarez.

Following the event, a representative of Janel Grant, the subject of the sex trafficking scandal, released a statement saying:

"For far too long, abuse was allowed to thrive under WWE's leadership. Instead of righting this wrong, WWE has done nothing to ensure those responsible are held accountable. This attempt to sweep misconduct under the rug will backfire. We look forward to the full set of facts, including those about Mr. Lesnar, coming out in a court of law where they belong but, in the meantime, we refer you back to Janel Grant's updated complaint, which outlines, in detail, the abuse she endured by McMahon and others while employed at WWE."

She also shared revised sections of Grant's lawsuit which named Brock Lesnar, and alleged that McMahon had arranged for Lesnar to receive explicit content of Grant as an incentive to sign a new deal with WWE in 2021.

== Aftermath ==
=== Raw ===
New World Heavyweight Champion Seth Rollins (accompanied by Bron Breakker, Bronson Reed, and Paul Heyman, now known as The Vision) opened the following episode of Raw to talk about his Money in the Bank cash-in. LA Knight interrupted, citing his win over Rollins at Saturday Night's Main Event XL after Rollins got injured. A match between Rollins and Knight for the title was scheduled for the main event with Breakker and Reed banned from ringside, which Rollins won by disqualification after CM Punk interfered and attacked Rollins. Afterwards, Breakker and Reed attacked Knight and Punk until Roman Reigns made the save. However, Rollins stood tall after laying out Reigns with a stomp, followed by a spear by Breakker and a trio of Tsunamis by Reed. The following week, Punk and Knight defeated Breakker and Reed via disqualification after Rollins attacked Punk. Jey Uso then appeared to help Knight and Punk, brawling with The Vision. Raw General Manager Adam Pearce then announced that Rollins would defend the World Heavyweight Championship against Punk, Knight, and Uso in a fatal four-way match at Clash in Paris. The following week on the August 18 episode, Rollins and Reed attempted to interfere in an Extreme Rules match between Uso and Breakker on the latter's behalf, only to be thwarted by a returning Reigns. Reigns subsequently issued a challenge for a match against Reed at Clash in Paris, which Reed accepted.

Also on Raw, Alexa Bliss and Charlotte Flair celebrated their WWE Women's Tag Team Championship win. Raquel Rodriguez and Roxanne Perez interrupted, setting up a title rematch, where Bliss and Flair retained.

Rhea Ripley wished Iyo Sky luck on her upcoming match against Naomi for the Women's World Championship on the August 11 episode of Raw. However, the match never happened as Naomi was not medically cleared to compete. It was subsequently revealed the following week that Naomi was legitimately pregnant with her first child, and that she would be taking maternity leave, thus vacating the title.

A rematch between Dominik Mysterio and AJ Styles for the Intercontinental Championship was scheduled for the September 1 episode of Raw, where Mysterio retained after interference by El Grande Americano.

=== SmackDown ===
John Cena opened the following episode of SmackDown, addressing his loss at SummerSlam and subsequent assault by Brock Lesnar before Logan Paul interrupted. Following an exchange of words a match between Cena and Paul was scheduled for Clash in Paris. Paul and Drew McIntyre then attacked Cena until new Undisputed WWE Champion Cody Rhodes made the save. This led to a tag team match where Cena and Rhodes defeated Paul and McIntyre via disqualification after Paul attacked Cena with a low blow. After the match, Cena and Paul brawled to the backstage while Rhodes and McIntyre fought ringside. McIntyre struck Rhodes with the WWE title belt and stared at it. McIntyre then hit a Claymore Kick on Rhodes through the side of the announce table. In reality, this was done to write Rhodes off television allowing him time to film the movie Street Fighter. After McIntyre defeated Randy Orton on the September 12 episode, he attempted to hit a Claymore Kick on Orton through the side of the announce table, only to be thwarted by a returning Rhodes. An Undisputed WWE Championship match between Rhodes and McIntyre was subsequently scheduled for Wrestlepalooza.

Brock Lesnar would next appear on the September 5 episode of SmackDown, attacking John Cena during Cena's bout. A match between Cena and Lesnar was subsequently scheduled for Wrestlepalooza.

After SummerSlam, Jade Cargill wanted another shot at Tiffany Stratton's WWE Women's Championship, and they both won a tag team match on the August 22 episode of SmackDown with Cargill making the pin. Because of that, Cargill was subsequently named the number one contender for the title the following week. The title match was scheduled for the September 12 episode, which ended in a double countout, after which, Nia Jax attacked Cargill and Stratton. Stratton would successfully defended the championship against both Cargill and Jax in a triple threat match on the September 26 episode of SmackDown. Cargill would eventually defeat Stratton at Saturday Night's Main Event XLI to win the title.

=== Broadcasting changes ===
In continuing WWE's near worldwide transition to Netflix, this would be the final SummerSlam to air on Disney+ in the Philippines before moving to Netflix on January 1, 2026. Throughout 2025, many of the select few countries that were still on the WWE Network due to pre-existing contracts gradually merged to Netflix with nearly all international markets on Netflix by January 1, 2026. The last few remaining countries that were still on the WWE Network merged under Netflix on April 1, 2026, making this 2025 event the last SummerSlam to air on the WWE Network in any country. Additionally, on August 6, 2025, WWE announced that ESPN's direct-to-consumer streaming service would assume the streaming rights of WWE's main roster PLEs in the United States. This was originally to begin with WrestleMania 42 in April 2026, but was pushed up to September 2025 with Wrestlepalooza. As such, this was the last SummerSlam to livestream on Peacock in the US.

== Results ==
Night 1 (August 2)
No.	Results	Stipulations	Times
1	Roman Reigns and Jey Uso defeated Bron Breakker and Bronson Reed (with Paul Heyman) by pinfall	Tag team match	21:10
2	Alexa Bliss and Charlotte Flair defeated The Judgment Day (Raquel Rodriguez and Roxanne Perez) (c) by pinfall	Tag team match for the WWE Women's Tag Team Championship	13:30
3	Sami Zayn defeated Karrion Kross (with Scarlett) by pinfall	Singles match Since Zayn won, Kross had to admit he was wrong about Zayn. Had Kross won, Zayn would have had to admit that Kross was right about Zayn that he was not the good guy he portrayed himself to be.	8:10
4	Tiffany Stratton (c) defeated Jade Cargill by pinfall	Singles match for the WWE Women's Championship	7:05
5	Drew McIntyre and Logan Paul defeated Randy Orton and Jelly Roll by pinfall	Tag team match	17:10
6	CM Punk defeated Gunther (c) by pinfall	Singles match for the World Heavyweight Championship	30:20
7	Seth Rollins (with Paul Heyman) defeated CM Punk (c) by pinfall	Singles match for the World Heavyweight Championship; This was Rollins's Money in the Bank cash-in match.	0:10
(c) / – the champion(s) heading into the match

Night 2 (August 3)
No.	Results	Stipulations	Times
1	Naomi (c) defeated Rhea Ripley and Iyo Sky by pinfall	Triple threat match for the Women's World Championship	16:20
2	The Wyatt Sicks (Dexter Lumis and Joe Gacy) (c) defeated Andrade and Rey Fénix, #DIY (Johnny Gargano and Tommaso Ciampa), Fraxiom (Axiom and Nathan Frazer), Motor City Machine Guns (Alex Shelley and Chris Sabin), and The Street Profits (Angelo Dawkins and Montez Ford) by retrieving the championship belts	Six-Pack tag team Tables, Ladders, and Chairs match for the WWE Tag Team Championship	16:00
3	Becky Lynch (c) defeated Lyra Valkyria by pinfall	No Disqualification, No Countout Last Chance match for the WWE Women's Intercontinental Championship; Since Lynch won, Valkyria could no longer challenge for the title for as long as Lynch was champion.	25:05
4	Solo Sikoa (c) defeated Jacob Fatu by escaping the cage	Steel Cage match for the WWE United States Championship	12:40
5	Dominik Mysterio (c) defeated AJ Styles by pinfall	Singles match for the WWE Intercontinental Championship	10:45
6	Cody Rhodes defeated John Cena (c) by pinfall	Street Fight for the Undisputed WWE Championship	37:45
(c) / – the champion(s) heading into the match
