= SummerSlam (2024) =

WWE premium live event

- Promotional poster featuring The Bloodline (Jacob Fatu, Tonga Loa, Solo Sikoa, and Tama Tonga)
- Promotion: WWE
- Brand(s): Raw; SmackDown
- Date: August 3, 2024
- City: Cleveland, Ohio
- Venue: Cleveland Browns Stadium
- Attendance: 57,791

WWE event chronology
← Previous; NXT Heatwave	Next → Bash in Berlin

SummerSlam chronology
← Previous; 2023	Next → 2025

The 2024 SummerSlam, also promoted as SummerSlam: Cleveland, was a professional wrestling premium live event (PLE) produced by WWE, held for wrestlers from the promotion's main roster brands, Raw and SmackDown. It was the 37th annual SummerSlam and took place on Saturday, August 3, 2024, at Cleveland Browns Stadium in Cleveland, Ohio. This was the second SummerSlam held in Cleveland, after the 1996 event, which was at the Gund Arena. WWE wrestler and Cleveland area native The Miz served as the host of the event.

This was the first SummerSlam held after WWE merged with the Endeavor subsidiary Ultimate Fighting Championship (UFC) in September 2023, under the banner of TKO Group Holdings. It was also the first SummerSlam to livestream on Abema in Japan and the final SummerSlam to air on Disney+ Hotstar in Indonesia, Binge in Australia, and the standalone WWE Network in most other international markets, as WWE's content in those areas moved to Netflix in January 2025, as well as the last on SonyLIV in India, which moved to Netflix in April 2025. The 2024 event also marked the final SummerSlam to be held as a one-night event as the following year was expanded to two nights, adopting the format used by WrestleMania since WrestleMania 36 in 2020.

Seven matches were contested at the event. In the main event, which was the main match from SmackDown, Cody Rhodes defeated Solo Sikoa in a Bloodline Rules match to retain the Undisputed WWE Championship. In the penultimate match, which was Raw's main match, Gunther defeated Damian Priest to win the World Heavyweight Championship. The event marked the return of Roman Reigns since going on hiatus following WrestleMania XL in April.

== Production ==
=== Background ===
The 37th annual SummerSlam was held at the Cleveland Browns Stadium in Cleveland, Ohio.

SummerSlam is an annual professional wrestling premium live event (PLE) traditionally held in August by WWE since 1988. It was originally broadcast exclusively via pay-per-view (PPV) before it began simulcasting on WWE's livestreaming platforms in 2014. Dubbed "The Biggest Party of the Summer", it is one of the promotion's original four PPVs, along with WrestleMania, Royal Rumble, and Survivor Series, referred to as the "Big Four", and as of August 2021, it is considered one of the "Big Five", along with Money in the Bank. Out of the five, it is considered WWE's second biggest event of the year behind WrestleMania.

Announced on March 12, 2024, the 37th SummerSlam was scheduled to be held on Saturday, August 3, 2024, at Cleveland Browns Stadium in Cleveland, Ohio and featured wrestlers from the Raw and SmackDown brand divisions. The event was in turn promoted as SummerSlam: Cleveland. This marked the second SummerSlam held in Cleveland, after the 1996 event, which was held at the Gund Arena.

On July 15, 2024, two official theme songs by country singer Jelly Roll, "Dead End Road" and "Liar", were presented for the event. Jelly Roll subsequently appeared in the SummerSlam promo video. During the July 22 episode of Monday Night Raw, it was announced that Jelly Roll would perform "Liar" live at SummerSlam. Japanese wrestler Naomichi Marufuji from Pro Wrestling Noah was also announced to be a special guest at SummerSlam, which was later confirmed to be a guest commentator role for the event's broadcast on Japan's Abema streaming service. This announcement came just days after WWE wrestler AJ Styles faced Marufuji at Noah Destination 2024. Additionally on July 29, WWE wrestler and Cleveland area native The Miz was announced as the host of the event.

=== Broadcast outlets ===
The PLE was broadcast on traditional PPV outlets worldwide. It was also available to livestream on Peacock in the United States, SonyLIV in India, Disney+ Hotstar in Indonesia, Disney+ in the Philippines, Binge in Australia, Abema in Japan, and the WWE Network everywhere else. This was the first SummerSlam to livestream on Abema after the Japanese version of the WWE Network merged under Abema in October 2023.

Following an announcement made on January 23, this was the final SummerSlam to air on the standalone WWE Network in most international markets where it was still available, as well as Disney+ Hotstar and Binge, as its content moved to Netflix in January 2025; a select few territories maintained the standalone WWE Network until early 2026 due to pre-existing contracts before they also merged under Netflix when those contracts expired.

=== Other SummerSlam related events ===
As part of SummerSlam weekend, the August 2 episode of Friday Night SmackDown was held at the nearby Rocket Mortgage FieldHouse, while Damian Priest, Sami Zayn, and WWE Hall of Famer The Undertaker all held events at the nearby Agora Theatre and Ballroom. Priest hosted a showing and panel discussion of his documentary on Friday afternoon prior to SmackDown, Zayn hosted a comedy show late Friday night following SmackDown, and Undertaker hosted his 1 deadMan Show on Saturday afternoon prior to SummerSlam.

=== Storylines ===
The card included seven matches that resulted from scripted storylines. Results were predetermined by WWE's writers on the Raw and SmackDown brands, while storylines were produced on WWE's weekly television programs, Monday Night Raw and Friday Night SmackDown.

During an appearance at the WWE Experience attraction in Saudi Arabia on May 23, 2024, WWE Chief content officer Paul "Triple H" Levesque announced that the winners of both the King of the Ring and Queen of the Ring tournaments would receive a match for the world championship of their respective brand at SummerSlam. At King and Queen of the Ring two days later, Raw's Gunther and SmackDown's Nia Jax won the respective tournaments, thus earning matches for the World Heavyweight Championship, held by Damian Priest, and the WWE Women's Championship, held by Bayley, respectively.

After Rhea Ripley cost Liv Morgan the WWE Women's Tag Team Championship in mid-2023, the two were scheduled for a match, however, the match never began as Ripley viciously attacked Morgan with a steel chair, injuring Morgan's shoulder and taking her out for several months. Morgan made her return at the 2024 Royal Rumble in January, and embarked on a "revenge tour", with her goal to take the Women's World Championship from Ripley due to Ripley taking months of her career. On the April 8 episode of Raw, Morgan attacked Ripley backstage, which legitimately injured Ripley's right arm and forced her to vacate the championship. Over the next few weeks, Morgan began to display more villainous traits. At King and Queen of the Ring, Morgan won the Women's World Championship after accidental interference from Ripley's onscreen love interest, "Dirty" Dominik Mysterio. Morgan then began trying to seduce Dominik, believing him to have intentionally assisted her in her victories, though members of Dominik's stable The Judgment Day attempted to keep the two separated. On the July 8 episode of Raw, Morgan and Dominik teamed up to defeat the Latino World Order (Rey Mysterio and Zelina Vega). The two celebrated Dominik's first win over his father and Dominik almost gave in and kissed Morgan, but Ripley made a surprise return and Morgan ran off while Ripley confronted Dominik. The following week, Ripley called out Morgan and challenged her to a match at SummerSlam for the Women's World Championship. Morgan appeared on the screen and accepted the challenge.

At WrestleMania XL in April, Cody Rhodes defeated Roman Reigns in a Bloodline Rules match to win the Undisputed WWE Championship, despite The Bloodline's efforts of preventing Rhodes from winning. Following the event, The Bloodline's leader Reigns and fellow member The Rock took a hiatus while Solo Sikoa became the acting leader, subsequently kicking Jimmy Uso out of the group and adding The Tongans (Tama Tonga and Tonga Loa) and Jacob Fatu to The Bloodline. The group's manager Paul Heyman was also later kicked out after he refused to acknowledge Sikoa as the new Tribal Chief of The Bloodline. At Money in the Bank, The Bloodline (Sikoa, Fatu, and Tama) defeated Rhodes, Kevin Owens, and Randy Orton in a six-man tag team match with Sikoa pinning Rhodes. On the following SmackDown, The Bloodline talked about their win when Rhodes interrupted and said he knew Sikoa wanted a match for the Undisputed WWE Championship at SummerSlam and accepted the challenge. The Bloodline then attacked him and fended off an attack by Orton before powerbombing Orton through the commentator's table. On SmackDown the night before SummerSlam, after Sikoa and Rhodes had a confrontation, Sikoa changed the stipulation of the match to a Bloodline Rules match and Rhodes accepted.

For months, LA Knight had been trying to get a match against Logan Paul for the WWE United States Championship. During a Money in the Bank qualifier match on the June 28 episode of SmackDown, Knight pinned Paul. Knight was unsuccessful in the Money in the Bank ladder match itself, but on the following SmackDown, he made an important note of how he pinned Paul to be in that ladder match and subsequently challenged Paul for the United States Championship. A contract signing was held on the July 19 episode, which made the match official for SummerSlam in Paul's native area of Cleveland.

At Money in the Bank, Sami Zayn defeated Bron Breakker to retain the WWE Intercontinental Championship. Breakker then began to viciously target Zayn and Ilja Dragunov over the next few weeks with the intent of facing Zayn again for the title. On the July 22 episode of Raw, Breakker was scheduled to face Dragunov with the winner facing Zayn for the Intercontinental Championship at SummerSlam. Breakker brutally beat Dragunov, causing a referee stoppage and thus naming Breakker the winner.

At Survivor Series: WarGames in November 2023, immediately following the men's WarGames match that Seth "Freakin" Rollins and Drew McIntyre both participated in, CM Punk made his return to WWE after being away for nearly 10 years. This caused great anger from both Rollins and McIntyre. Rollins and Punk subsequently began feuding, and Punk entered the men's Royal Rumble match in January with the intention of winning and challenging Rollins for the World Heavyweight Championship at WrestleMania XL. McIntyre also entered the Rumble and during the match, Punk legitimately tore his right triceps but not before Punk eliminated McIntyre from the match. Following this, McIntyre won the men's Elimination Chamber match at Elimination Chamber to face Rollins for the title at WrestleMania while also mocking Punk over his injury. Punk was subsequently appointed as a special guest commentator for Rollins and McIntyre's WrestleMania match, which McIntyre won to win the title. After the match, McIntyre gloated in front of Punk, who attacked McIntyre, allowing Damian Priest to cash in his Money in the Bank contract and ending McIntyre's reign at under six minutes. On the following Raw, Punk cost McIntyre a World Heavyweight Title No. 1 Contender's match. Punk would again cost McIntyre the title at Clash at the Castle and at the Money in the Bank event when McIntyre cashed in the Money in the Bank contract he had just won. For the latter, Punk's interference not only cost McIntyre the title, but it also cost Rollins as Rollins was facing Priest for the title when McIntyre cashed in his contract. This would ultimately lead to a match between McIntyre and Punk, who was medically cleared, being scheduled for SummerSlam with Rollins appointed as the special guest referee. On the final Raw before SummerSlam, Rollins claimed he would be lenient in calling the match, implying there would likely not be a disqualification or a countout.

== Event ==
Other on-screen personnel
Role:	Name:
Host	The Miz
Musical guest	Jelly Roll
English commentators	Michael Cole
English commentators	Corey Graves
English commentators	Pat McAfee
Spanish commentators	Marcelo Rodríguez
Spanish commentators	Jerry Soto
Japanese commentator	Naomichi Marufuji
Ring announcer	Samantha Irvin
Referees	Jason Ayers
Referees	Dan Engler
Referees	Daphanie LaShaunn
Referees	Eddie Orengo
Referees	Chad Patton
Referees	Seth "Freakin" Rollins (CM Punk vs. McIntyre)
Referees	Ryan Tran
Interviewers	Cathy Kelley
Interviewers	Byron Saxton
Pre-show panel	Jackie Redmond
Pre-show panel	Big E
Pre-show panel	Wade Barrett
Pre-show panel	Peter Rosenberg
Pre-show panel	X-Pac

=== Preliminary matches ===
The PLE opened with Triple H hyping up the crowd and introducing country singer Jelly Roll, who sang "God Bless America" and his own song, "Liar", which was one of Jelly Roll's two theme songs for SummerSlam. The event's host The Miz then appeared to further hype up the crowd for the event.

The first match on the card saw Liv Morgan defend Raw's Women's World Championship against Rhea Ripley (accompanied by "Dirty" Dominik Mysterio). Early in the match, Morgan continually attempted to avoid Ripley by diving in and out of the ring, but Ripley eventually tricked Morgan back into the ring and began to brutally beat her. Morgan managed to dodge a shoulder charge into the turnbuckle from Ripley, causing the latter to pop her shoulder out. Taking advantage of the injury, Morgan performed a Codebreaker, and Ripley responded by knocking Morgan down and retreating to ringside. Ripley forced her shoulder back into its socket by ramming it into the announcers table. Morgan continued to focus her assault on Ripley's shoulder. With Ripley stunned for a moment, Morgan went ringside to get a steel chair, while Ripley responded by landing the Riptide. Ripley then took the chair Morgan had retrieved, seemingly ready to attack her, but she was stopped by Mysterio, who told her that she would be disqualified if she attempted to use the chair; Morgan blindsided Ripley, landing Oblivion for another near fall. However, Mysterio then distracted the referee, allowing Morgan to perform Oblivion on Ripley onto the chair and then pinned Ripley to retain the championship. In the aftermath, Mysterio joined and kissed Morgan at ringside, grinning at Ripley to signify his betrayal and new loyalty to Morgan.

In the second match, Sami Zayn defended Raw's Intercontinental Championship against Bron Breakker. Breakker attempted to end the match early by hitting Zayn with a spear, but Zayn, having learned from previous matches, leapt over him, causing Breakker to crash into the corner. The match went back and forth, with Zayn seemingly holding his own despite Breakker's aggression, landing a Blue Thunder Bomb and several other maneuvers; however, after performing a Frankensteiner and avoiding Zayn's Helluva Kick by spearing him, Breakker ran the ropes to achieve high speed and speared Zayn once more and pinned him to win the Intercontinental Championship, his first title on the main roster.

Next, Logan Paul defended SmackDown's United States Championship against LA Knight. Paul, among loud boos from the crowd, was greeted by Cleveland's own Machine Gun Kelly (MGK), who was disguised as a security guard and joined Paul at ringside. Before the match officially started, Knight and Paul brawled around the ring before eventually forcing one another into the ring and officially starting the match. In the climax, Paul went to MGK and his other allies at ringside; Knight then attacked them, but Paul was able to obtain his signature brass knuckles from MGK. Managing to land a blow with the knuckles on Knight, Paul attempted to follow up with a Buckshot Lariat, but Knight prevented it, landing the BFT and pinning Paul to win the United States Championship, his first championship on the main roster.

After that, Bayley defended SmackDown's WWE Women's Championship against Nia Jax. In the final moments, Tiffany Stratton ran down to the ring, seemingly to cash in her Money in the Bank contract. Climbing the apron, Stratton was assaulted by Bayley, who put a stop to what she believed was a cash in; however, it was a ruse. Jax attempted to charge the distracted Bayley, but she was rolled up for a two count. Bayley attempted an attack, but Jax countered with a powerbomb, followed by 2 Annihilators, and subsequently pinned Bayley to win the WWE Women's Championship for a second time (her first reign was when the title was known as the Raw Women's Championship). Stratton then joined with Jax to celebrate the win.

In the fifth match, which was a match from Raw and the only non-title match on the card, Drew McIntyre faced CM Punk with Seth "Freakin" Rollins serving as the special guest referee. As Rollins implied on the Raw prior to SummerSlam, he did not disqualify or count out either combatant. In the closing moments, Punk managed to recover the bracelet with his wife (AJ Lee) and dog's (Larry) name on it that McIntyre had stolen weeks before but McIntyre managed to get it back as it fell in the ring. Rollins subsequently grabbed it and put it on to keep it out of the way, but Punk did not see this, thinking that Rollins was trying to mess with him. Rollins was eventually knocked down by the two combatants. Punk landed the GTS on McIntyre, pinning McIntyre for nearly ten seconds; however, Rollins only recovered at the last few seconds, leading to McIntyre being able to kick out. Punk berated Rollins, who in turn scolded Punk. A frustrated Punk then performed the GTS on Rollins before receiving a low blow from McIntyre. After one last Claymore, McIntyre pinned Punk; a visibly pained Rollins crawled over to the two, counting twice, hesitating before counting to three, giving McIntyre the win. McIntyre then, once again, took Punk's bracelet from him before leaving the ring.

In the penultimate match, Damian Priest defended Raw's World Heavyweight Championship against Gunther. Midway into the match, Priest was joined at ringside by fellow Judgment Day member Finn Bálor, who cheered him on, although Priest told him to stay backstage. Despite overwhelming force, Priest managed to land a South of Heaven on Gunther, pinning him; however, Bálor draped Gunther's leg over the rope, breaking the count. Priest saw the replay on the stadium screen, realizing Bálor had betrayed him. He viciously tried to attack Bálor, but was put into a chokehold by Gunther. Against all odds, Priest broke out of the chokehold, but instead of attacking Gunther, he continued to target Bálor. Gunther got him into another chokehold, this time forcing the referee to call the match, awarding Gunther with the World Heavyweight Championship.

Before the main event, SummerSlam host The Miz and his tag team partner R-Truth announced an attendance of 57,791. SmackDown tag team A-Town Down Under (Austin Theory and Grayson Waller) interrupted and mocked Miz, Truth, and Cleveland. They also poked fun at Jelly Roll, who entered the ring with a chair and attacked A-Town Down Under. Jelly Roll then performed a chokeslam on Theory, followed by he, Miz, and Truth simultaneously performing John Cena's Five Knuckle Shuffle on Theory.

=== Main event ===
In the main event, Cody Rhodes defended SmackDown's Undisputed WWE Championship against Solo Sikoa in a Bloodline Rules match. Before Rhodes could make his entrance, he was met by Arn Anderson backstage, making his first WWE appearance since 2019, assuring Rhodes that he would have backup in the match. During the match, Rhodes performed a Cross Rhodes on Sikoa, after which, The Bloodline's Tama Tonga and Tonga Loa came out and savagely attacked Rhodes. Kevin Owens and Randy Orton then came out to assist Rhodes, who chased away both of Sikoa's Bloodline allies. After Rhodes attacked Sikoa with the steel steps, he was then attacked by Jacob Fatu. Fatu placed Rhodes onto the announcer's table, and performed a frog splash from the top turnbuckle.

As Sikoa and Rhodes were lying in the ring, Roman Reigns made his return, his first appearance since WrestleMania XL, much to the chagrin of Sikoa, who had crowned himself as the Tribal Chief of The Bloodline in Reigns's absence and had been antagonizing Reigns, claiming that Reigns would never return and that if he did return and wanted his position back, he would have to take it from Sikoa. Reigns attacked Sikoa and performed a spear on him, after which, Reigns symbolically gestured a nod of approval to Rhodes before departing the ring, briefly gazing back at Rhodes from a distance. Following this, Rhodes performed the Cross Rhodes on Sikoa to retain the championship. During the pinfall, it was noted that Rhodes' gaze was fixated on Reigns who stood at ringside.

== Reception ==
Reviewing the event for the Wrestling Observer Newsletter, Dave Meltzer gave the opening bout for the Women's World Championship 3.5 stars, the match for the Intercontinental Championship and the match for the WWE Women's Championship 2.5 stars (the joint lowest scores of the night), the WWE United States Championship match and Undisputed WWE Championship 4 stars, the McIntyre/Punk match 3 stars, and the World Heavyweight Championship match 4.25 stars (the highest score of the night).

== Aftermath ==
The 2024 SummerSlam would be the final SummerSlam to take place as a one-night event, as the next year's event was expanded to two nights, adopting the format originally used for WrestleMania since WrestleMania 36 in 2020. In addition to the majority of countries moving to Netflix in January 2025, this would also be the final SummerSlam to air on SonyLIV in India following the expiration of WWE's contract with SonyLIV with India then moving to Netflix on April 1, 2025.

=== Raw ===
On the following episode of Raw, CM Punk talked about his match with Drew McIntyre and stated he was ready for another fight. Seth "Freakin" Rollins interrupted and they were about to engage in a brawl when McIntyre appeared from the crowd with Punk's bracelet. Punk then chased McIntyre away and afterwards, Bronson Reed, who previously told Raw General Manager Adam Pearce he would be paving his own path to the top, attacked Rollins with six Tsunamis, writing Rollins off television for the next few weeks. On the August 12 episode, McIntyre and Punk brawled, which ended with Punk whipping McIntyre with a belt. This set up a strap match between the two for Bash in Berlin.

Also on Raw, Finn Bálor excommunicated Damian Priest and Rhea Ripley from The Judgment Day, with it subsequently consisting of himself, "Dirty" Dominik Mysterio, Women's World Champion Liv Morgan, JD McDonagh, and Carlito. Later that night, Priest was attacked by Bálor during his match against McDonagh before Ripley came out to save him. This led to a mixed tag team match pitting Priest and Ripley, taking on the name the Terror Twins, against Mysterio and Morgan for Bash in Berlin. Priest would eventually earn a rematch against Gunther's World Heavyweight Championship by winning a fatal four-way match on the November 4 episode of Raw.

A two out of three falls match between Bron Breakker and Sami Zayn for the Intercontinental Championship was scheduled for the August 12 episode of Raw, where Breakker retained to end the feud.

=== SmackDown ===
After successfully defending his championship against Solo Sikoa, on the August 9 episode of SmackDown, Cody Rhodes was saved by an attack by the new Bloodline by Kevin Owens. Rhodes then offered Owens a title match for the Undisputed WWE Champion, which Owens initially rejected, claiming he didn't deserve it. Later, backstage, Rhodes and general manager Nick Aldis discussed his next championship match, with Aldis implying he would award a returning Roman Reigns; Owens reappeared, enraged at the prospect of Reigns getting the title shot, stating that if anyone in the locker room deserved it more; Aldis agreed, stating that everyone knows that Rhodes' next title match would be against Owens, setting the match for Bash in Berlin later that month.

After the return of Roman Reigns at SummerSlam, Solo Sikoa and the new Bloodline prepared for his arrival on the August 9 episode of SmackDown. Reigns arrived, fending off Tama Tonga and Tonga Loa, before dispatching Sikoa with a Superman Punch. With the Ula Fala - the sign of leadership of the Bloodline - laying on the ring, Reigns attempted to retrieve it; However, he was attacked by Tonga. Eventually, Sikoa and the Bloodline left, leaving Reigns standing tall in the ring. On the August 16 episode, Reigns and the Bloodline would once again battle, though this time Reigns was able to retrieve and wear the Ula Fala. However, he was ambushed by Jacob Fatu, leading to the Bloodline performing a powerbomb on Reigns through the table. Following his successful title defense at Bash in Berlin, Cody Rhodes was scheduled to defend the Undisputed WWE Championship against Sikoa in a Steel Cage match on the September 13 episode of SmackDown.

Miss Money in the Bank Tiffany Stratton celebrated Nia Jax's WWE Women's Championship win on the August 16 episode of SmackDown. Bayley returned on the August 30 episode during Jax's successful title defense to impede Stratton. On the September 13 episode, it was announced that Jax would defend the title at Bad Blood. Bayley and Naomi both wanted to face Jax for the title, and they simultaneously pinned Jax during a tag team match the following week. On the September 27 episode, Bayley defeated Naomi to earn a rematch against Jax for the title at Bad Blood.

== Results ==
No.	Results	Stipulations	Times
1	Liv Morgan (c) defeated Rhea Ripley (with "Dirty" Dominik Mysterio) by pinfall	Singles match for the Women's World Championship	15:55
2	Bron Breakker defeated Sami Zayn (c) by pinfall	Singles match for the WWE Intercontinental Championship	5:40
3	LA Knight defeated Logan Paul (c) (with Machine Gun Kelly) by pinfall	Singles match for the WWE United States Championship	12:00
4	Nia Jax defeated Bayley (c) by pinfall	Singles match for the WWE Women's Championship	12:30
5	Drew McIntyre defeated CM Punk by pinfall	Singles match Seth "Freakin" Rollins was the special guest referee.	17:00
6	Gunther defeated Damian Priest (c) by technical submission	Singles match for the World Heavyweight Championship	16:40
7	Cody Rhodes (c) defeated Solo Sikoa by pinfall	Bloodline Rules match for the Undisputed WWE Championship	29:10
(c) / – the champion(s) heading into the match
