= WWE Clash (disambiguation) =

WWE Clash was a series of events also held by WWE in the United Kingdom in 2022 and 2024.

WWE Clash may also refer to:

- WWE Clash of Champions, a series of events produced by WWE, themed around championship matches and was held from 2016 to 2020
- Clash in Paris, a pay-per-view and livestreaming event held by WWE in Nanterre, France on August 31, 2025
- Clash in Italy, an upcoming pay-per-view and livestreaming event to be hold by WWE in Turin, Italy on May 31, 2026
