= Bash in Berlin =

2024 WWE premium live event

- Promotional poster featuring Gunther
- Promotion: WWE
- Brand(s): Raw; SmackDown
- Date: August 31, 2024
- City: Berlin, Germany
- Venue: Uber Arena
- Attendance: 13,149

WWE event chronology
← Previous; SummerSlam	Next → NXT No Mercy

WWE in Europe chronology
← Previous; Clash at the Castle	Next → Clash in Paris

Bash in Berlin was a 2024 professional wrestling premium live event (PLE) produced by the American company WWE, held for wrestlers from the promotion's main roster brands, Raw and SmackDown. It took place on Saturday, August 31, 2024, at the Uber Arena in Berlin, Germany. This was WWE's first PLE to be held in Germany and it aired live at 7:00 p.m. Central European Time (1:00 p.m. Eastern Time).

Five matches were contested at the event. In the main event, which was the main match from Raw and was also an interbrand match, European native Gunther defeated SmackDown's Randy Orton by technical submission to retain the World Heavyweight Championship. In the opening match, which was SmackDown's main match, Cody Rhodes defeated Kevin Owens to retain the Undisputed WWE Championship. In another prominent match, CM Punk defeated Drew McIntyre in a strap match which was Punk's first WWE televised win in over a decade.

The event received generally positive reviews, with praise directed towards the World Heavyweight Championship match.

== Production ==
=== Background ===
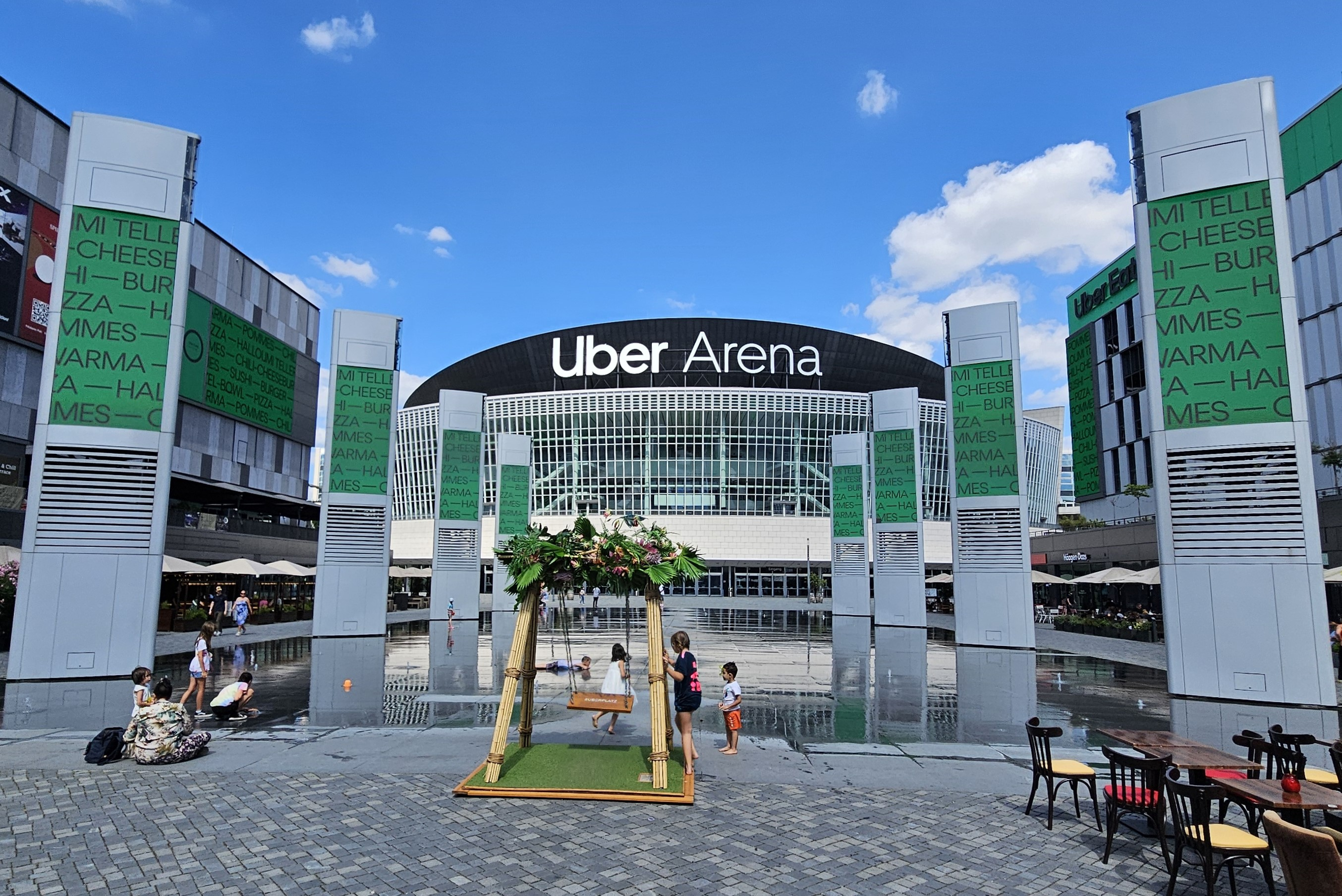
The event was held at the Uber Arena in Berlin, Germany, marking WWE's first premium live event to be held in the country.

On October 25, 2023, the American professional wrestling promotion WWE announced that it would be holding a premium live event (PLE) titled Bash in Berlin on Saturday, August 31, 2024, in Berlin, Germany at the Mercedes-Benz Arena, which was renamed to Uber Arena in March 2024, five months before the event was held. It featured wrestlers from the promotion's Raw and SmackDown brand divisions. This marked WWE's first-ever PLE to be held in Germany—this is not to be confused with WWE's first-ever event in the country, which was held on April 14, 1992, as part of the European Rampage Tour (then as World Wrestling Federation; WWF).

It was also announced that the August 30 episode of Friday Night SmackDown would air live locally from the same venue, which was the first time for the program to broadcast from Germany. Tickets went on sale on November 30, 2023. An additional five nights of WWE Live shows in Europe preceding SmackDown were also scheduled as part of the "Road to Bash in Berlin" tour, concluding with Bash in Berlin itself. The official theme song of the event was "Ratatata" by Babymetal and Electric Callboy.

=== Broadcast outlets ===
The PLE aired on traditional pay-per-view (PPV) worldwide. It was also available to livestream on Peacock in the United States, SonyLIV in India, Disney+ Hotstar in Indonesia, Disney+ in the Philippines, Binge in Australia, Abema in Japan, and the WWE Network everywhere else. With the event being held in Germany, it aired live at 7:00 p.m. Central European Time (1:00 p.m. Eastern Time).

=== Storylines ===
The card included five matches that resulted from scripted storylines. Results were predetermined by WWE's writers on the Raw and SmackDown brands, while storylines were produced on WWE's weekly television programs, Monday Night Raw and Friday Night SmackDown.

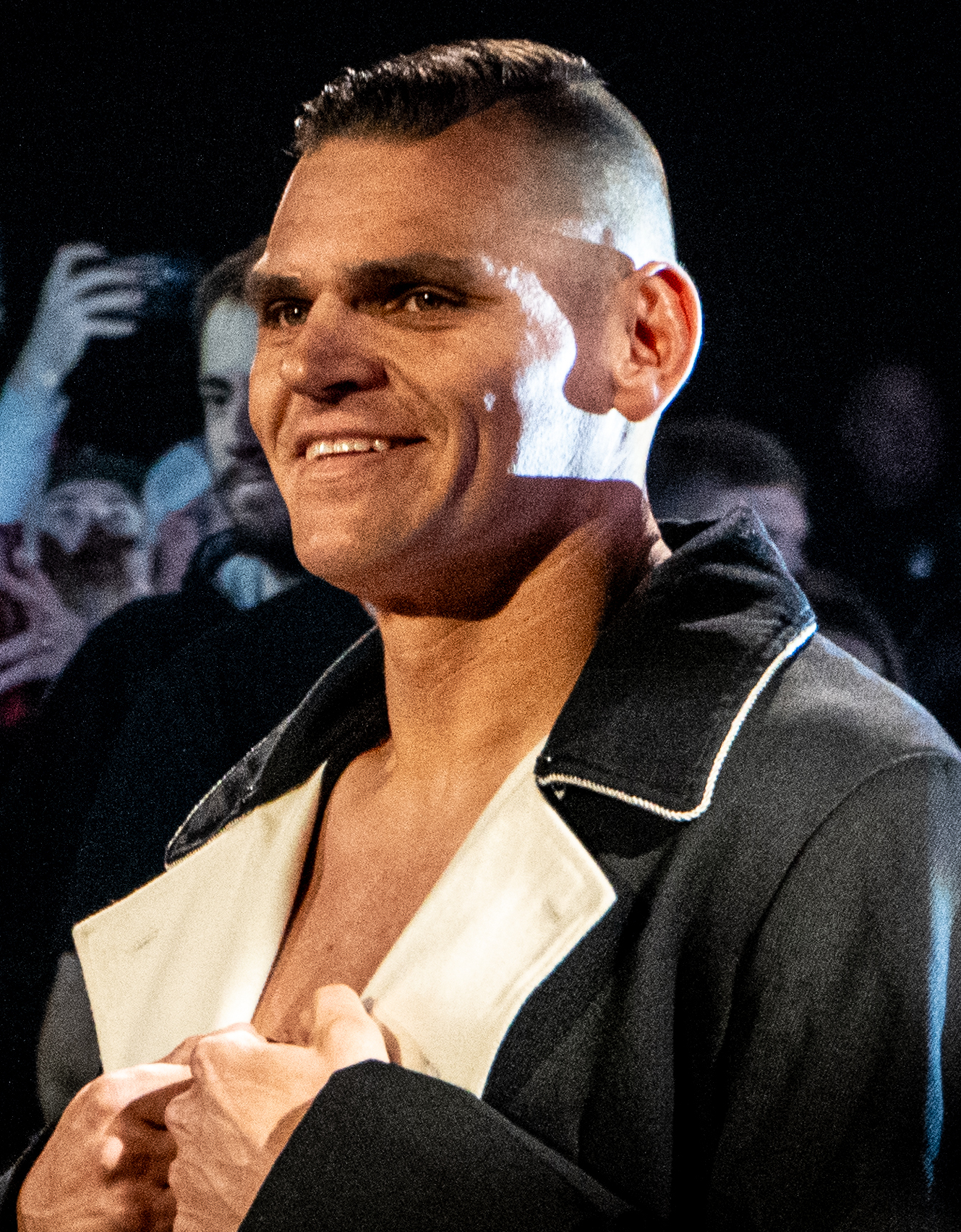
European native Gunther defended Raw's World Heavyweight Championship in the main event of Bash in Berlin.

At King and Queen of the Ring, Raw's Gunther defeated SmackDown's Randy Orton in the final of the King of the Ring tournament, which earned him a match for Raw's World Heavyweight Championship at SummerSlam. During the King of the Ring final, however, Orton's shoulder was not fully on the mat when the referee counted the pin. After the show, WWE Chief Content Officer Paul "Triple H" Levesque noted the mistake and said the referee's decision was final but that there would likely be a rematch between the two. At SummerSlam, Gunther won the World Heavyweight Championship, and during his speech on the following Raw, he was interrupted by Orton, who noted that because of that mistake in the King of the Ring final, that ultimately allowed Gunther to become champion. Orton then said that he wanted his rematch at Bash in Berlin so he could take the World Heavyweight Championship from Gunther, who accepted the challenge. It was later stipulated that if Orton won the championship, he would be transferred to Raw with Gunther transferred to SmackDown.

At SummerSlam, Cody Rhodes retained the Undisputed WWE Championship against Solo Sikoa in a Bloodline Rules match, which included aid from Kevin Owens in fending off other members of The Bloodline (Jacob Fatu, Tama Tonga, and Tonga Loa). On the following episode of SmackDown, Rhodes spoke about who he wanted to defend the title against at Bash in Berlin, but was interrupted by The Bloodline (Sikoa, Tama, and Loa), with Sikoa wanting a rematch. Rhodes declined, stating that Sikoa did not deserve it, and as The Bloodline were about to enter the ring to attack Rhodes, Owens again came to his aid. Rhodes then revealed that he wanted to defend the title against Owens as a token of gratitude for all the times Owens had helped Rhodes fend off The Bloodline. Owens felt that he had not earned the opportunity due to his win/loss record, but despite his objection, Rhodes spoke to SmackDown General Manager Nick Aldis and had the match approved for Bash in Berlin.

At SummerSlam, Liv Morgan defeated Rhea Ripley to retain the Women's World Championship after seemingly accidental interference from Ripley's on-screen love interest and Judgment Day stablemate, "Dirty" Dominik Mysterio. After the match, however, Mysterio turned on Ripley and kissed Morgan, ending their partnership. Later that night, fellow Judgment Day member Damian Priest lost the World Heavyweight Championship to Gunther after being betrayed by fellow stablemate Finn Bálor. On the following episode of Raw, Bálor excommunicated Priest and Ripley from the group, now consisting of himself, Mysterio, Morgan, JD McDonagh, and Carlito. Later that night, Priest was attacked by Bálor during his match against McDonagh before Ripley came out to save him. The following week, a mixed tag team match between the team of Priest and Ripley, who took on the name the Terror Twins, and Mysterio and Morgan was made official for Bash in Berlin.

At SummerSlam, Drew McIntyre defeated CM Punk in a match that featured Seth "Freakin" Rollins as the special guest referee. Weeks prior to the event, McIntyre had stolen Punk's bracelet that had his wife (AJ Lee) and dog's (Larry) names on it. During the match at SummerSlam, Punk retrieved the bracelet but accidentally dropped it. After Rollins picked it up to get it out of the way, Punk attacked Rollins as he thought Rollins was sabotaging him, which ultimately cost Punk the match and led to McIntyre stealing the bracelet again. On the August 12 episode of Raw, the two were involved in a brawl, which ended with Punk whipping McIntyre with a belt. On the following episode, Punk announced that Raw General Manager Adam Pearce approved a strap match at Bash in Berlin between him and McIntyre, who came out and accepted the challenge.

At Clash at the Castle, The Unholy Union (Alba Fyre and Isla Dawn) defeated defending champions Bianca Belair and Jade Cargill and the team of Shayna Baszler and Zoey Stark, who they pinned, to win the WWE Women's Tag Team Championship. Over the next few weeks, Belair and Cargill vowed to regain the title. On the August 2 episode of SmackDown, Belair and Cargill defeated Fyre and Dawn in a rematch via disqualification after interference from Blair Davenport. Since championships do not change hands by disqualification or countout unless otherwise stipulated, Fyre and Dawn retained the title. On August 23, SmackDown General Manager Nick Aldis announced that Fyre and Dawn would defend the WWE Women's Tag Team Championship against Belair and Cargill at Bash in Berlin.

== Event ==
Other on-screen personnel
Role:	Name:
English commentators	Michael Cole
English commentators	Wade Barrett
Spanish commentators	Marcelo Rodríguez
Spanish commentators	Jerry Soto
German commentators	Sebastian Hackl
German commentators	Manu Thiele
Ring announcer	Samantha Irvin
Ring announcer	Ludwig Kaiser (Gunther)
Referees	Jessika Carr
Referees	Dan Engler
Referees	Charles Robinson
Referees	Rod Zapata
Interviewers	Cathy Kelley
Interviewers	Byron Saxton
Pre-show panel	Jackie Redmond
Pre-show panel	Big E
Pre-show panel	The Miz
Pre-show correspondent	Peter Rosenberg

=== Preliminary matches ===
The PLE began with Cody Rhodes defending the Undisputed WWE Championship against Kevin Owens. Rhodes attempted to execute a Cody Cutter and Disaster Kick, both of which were countered by Owens. Rhodes went for a suicide dive outside of the ring, but Owens caught him and performed a cannonball on Rhodes. Rhodes applied the figure-four leg lock on Owens, who reached the ropes to void the submission. Owens performed a rolling senton on Rhodes from the middle rope for a nearfall. Owens performed a fisherman brainbuster on Rhodes from the top rope for a nearfall. In the climax, Owens attempted an apron powerbomb on Rhodes, but sent Rhodes inside the ring and performed a stunner for a nearfall. Rhodes performed the Cross Rhodes twice but Owens countered the third attempt into a stunner for a nearfall. Owens attempted a top-rope senton, but Rhodes got his knees up and performed the Cross Rhodes to retain the title. After the match, Rhodes and Owens hugged each other.

Next, The Unholy Union (Alba Fyre and Isla Dawn) defended the WWE Women's Tag Team Championship against Bianca Belair and Jade Cargill. The match was evenly controlled by both teams. Dawn performed a senton on Belair, but Cargill pulled Belair out of the ring. Dawn attempted a splash on Belair, who moved out of the way and caused Dawn to land on Fyre. Belair and Cargill then performed a DDT and wheelbarrow suplex combination on Fyre to win the title.

In the third match, Drew McIntyre faced CM Punk in a strap match. McIntyre had the early advantage when he attacked Punk before the match and touched three corners, before Punk prevented him from touching the fourth. McIntyre attempted a chop but Punk countered with a GTS. As Punk set up a table, McIntyre sent him inside the ring and performed a Claymore Kick. Punk applied the Sharpshooter on McIntyre and made him pass out, touching two corners before McIntyre executed a neckbreaker on Punk. McIntyre retrieved Punk's bracelet and performed a Claymore Kick on Punk. McIntyre touched three corners, but as he was about to touch the fourth, Punk performed the GTS twice before touching two corners. Punk performed the GTS two more times; the first before touching the third corner, and the second before touching the fourth corner with his wrist containing his bracelet to win the match.

The penultimate match saw Liv Morgan and "Dirty" Dominik Mysterio face Rhea Ripley and Damian Priest. In the climax, Ripley and Priest performed Razor's Edge powerbombs on Morgan and Mysterio. When Morgan had Ripley pinned, Carlito, JD McDonagh, and Finn Bálor interfered. Bálor performed a Slingblade on Priest and Mysterio performed a 619 and a Frog splash on Priest for a nearfall. McDonagh distracted Ripley before being taken out alongside the rest of the Judgment Day by Priest. Ripley then executed a Riptide on Morgan to win the match.

=== Main event ===
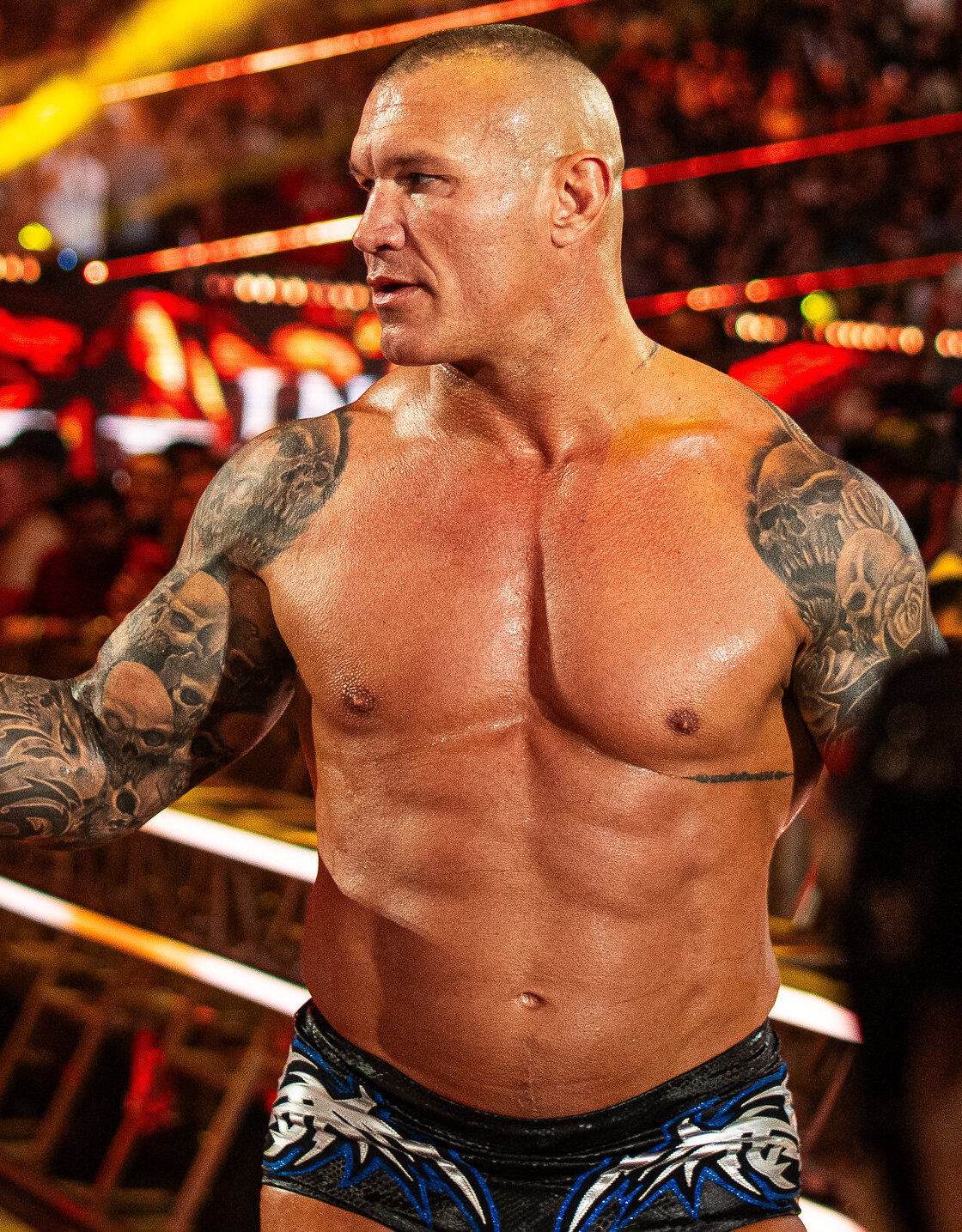
SmackDown's Randy Orton, who faced Gunther for Raw's World Heavyweight Championship in an interbrand match.

In the main event, Gunther defended the World Heavyweight Championship against Randy Orton. Orton performed a back body drop on Gunther onto the announce table four times. Orton performed a fallaway slam on Gunther for a one count. After Gunther took back control with a series of clotheslines, Orton performed a superplex on Gunther from the middle rope. Gunther countered an RKO attempt into a German suplex. Gunther followed up with a shotgun dropkick and a top-rope splash for a nearfall. Gunther performed a powerbomb on Orton for a nearfall. Orton countered a powerbomb attempt into an RKO for a nearfall. Orton performed a back body drop on Gunther onto the ring steps before doing the same through the announce table. Inside the ring, Orton attempted an RKO, but Gunther countered it into a sleeper hold, and Orton eventually passed out, meaning Gunther retained the title. After the match, Orton and Gunther shook hands.

== Reception ==
WrestleTix reported a total of 13,437 tickets sold, with announcer Michael Cole stating that there was a total, sold out attendance of 13,149 fans.

The event received generally positive reviews from critics. John Canton of TJR Wrestling gave the show a score of 8 out of 10, calling it one of the best PLE's of the year. He gave particular praise to the World Heavyweight Championship bout, deeming it a "slow paced, hard-hitting fight between two big dudes who... put on a classic championship match", and praising the finish of Gunther's sleeper hold as showcasing his role as a "badass". He called the rest of the card solid, particularly noting the Undisputed WWE Championship match as "excellent", both showcasing Rhodes's excellence as a champion and establishing Owens as a challenger. Writing for 411MANIA, Thomas Hall gave the show a score of 8.5 out of 10, noting the predictability of the championship matches, but said there was "nothing close to bad" within the event. He called the Heavyweight Championship bout "strong", but noted that it "probably went about ten minutes too long" whilst expressing his pleasure at Gunther's clean win over Orton. He was also very positive towards the strap match between McIntyre and Punk, stating that it was "the kind of brutal, violent match that it needed to be" and declaring it overall an "awesome fight".

Reviewing the show for the Wrestling Observer Newsletter, Dave Meltzer gave the Undisputed WWE Championship match 4.25 stars, the Women's Tag Team Championship match 3 stars, the Mixed Tag Team match 3.75 stars, and both the Strap Match and World Heavyweight Championship matches 4.5 stars, the highest ratings of the night.

== Aftermath ==
On the following episode of Raw, Women's World Champion Liv Morgan attacked Rhea Ripley and injured her leg, while later that night, Damian Priest and Jey Uso defeated The Judgment Day (Finn Bálor and JD McDonagh). The following week, it was announced that Morgan would defend the title against Ripley at Bad Blood, and Priest and Bálor agreed to a match at the event. It was also announced that the title match would feature "Dirty" Dominik Mysterio suspended above the ring in a shark cage. At Bad Blood, Priest defeated Bálor, and Ripley defeated Morgan via disqualification after interference from the returning Raquel Rodriguez, who later join The Judgment Day. Since championships do not change hands by disqualification or countout unless otherwise stipulated, Morgan retained the title.

Also on Raw, CM Punk addressed his victory over Drew McIntyre and began to focus on winning the World Heavyweight Championship from Gunther. However, he was brutally attacked by McIntyre, who snapped the bracelet and shoved the beads of the bracelet down Punk's throat. The following week, McIntyre claimed to have ended Punk's career, only for Raw General Manager Adam Pearce to inform McIntyre that he would face Punk in a Hell in a Cell match at Bad Blood. At Bad Blood, Punk defeated McIntyre to end their feud in a widely acclaimed match.

On the September 2 episode of Raw, The Unholy Union (Alba Fyre and Isla Dawn) defeated Damage CTRL (Iyo Sky and Kairi Sane) to become the number one contenders to the WWE Women's Tag Team Championship. The following week, Bianca Belair and Jade Cargill successfully defended the titles against Fyre and Dawn in a rematch.

== Results ==
No.	Results	Stipulations	Times
1	Cody Rhodes (c) defeated Kevin Owens by pinfall	Singles match for the Undisputed WWE Championship	23:16
2	Bianca Belair and Jade Cargill defeated The Unholy Union (Alba Fyre and Isla Dawn) (c) by pinfall	Tag team match for the WWE Women's Tag Team Championship	12:02
3	CM Punk defeated Drew McIntyre by touching all four corners uninterrupted	Strap match	19:15
4	Damian Priest and Rhea Ripley defeated The Judgment Day ("Dirty" Dominik Mysterio and Liv Morgan) by pinfall	Mixed tag team match	14:20
5	Gunther (c) defeated Randy Orton by technical submission	Singles match for the World Heavyweight Championship; Had Orton won the championship, he would have been transferred to Raw and Gunther would have been transferred to SmackDown.	34:28
(c) / – the champion(s) heading into the match
