= Clash in Paris =

2025 WWE premium live event

- Promotional poster featuring Roman Reigns, inspired by Vincent van Gogh's The Starry Night painting
- Promotion: WWE
- Brand(s): Raw; SmackDown
- Date: August 31, 2025
- City: La Défense, Nanterre, France
- Venue: Paris La Défense Arena
- Attendance: 30,343

WWE event chronology
← Previous; NXT Heatwave	Next → Worlds Collide: Las Vegas

Clash chronology
← Previous; Clash at the Castle (2024)	Next → Clash in Italy (2026)

WWE in Europe chronology
← Previous; Bash in Berlin	Next → Clash in Italy

Clash in Paris was a 2025 professional wrestling premium live event (PLE) produced by the American company WWE, held for wrestlers from the promotion's main roster brands, Raw and SmackDown. It was the third Clash event, truncated from the previous title of Clash at the Castle, and took place on Sunday, August 31, 2025, at the Paris La Défense Arena in La Défense, Nanterre, France. This was WWE's second PLE held in France, after Backlash in May 2024, but the first in the Paris metropolitan area, and it aired live at 8:00 p.m. Central European Time (2:00 p.m. Eastern Time).

Six matches were contested at the event. In the main event, Seth Rollins defeated CM Punk, LA Knight, and Jey Uso in a fatal four-way match to retain Raw's World Heavyweight Championship. In other prominent matches, John Cena defeated Logan Paul, and in the opening bout, Roman Reigns defeated Bronson Reed. This would be Cena's first and only appearance at a PLE in France as an in-ring performer due to his retirement from professional wrestling at the end of 2025.

This was the first Clash event to broadcast on Netflix in most international markets following the WWE Network's merger under Netflix in January 2025 in those areas, and it would also be the last on the WWE Network in any country as the last few countries that were still on the service due to pre-existing contracts merged under Netflix on April 1, 2026. It was also the final Clash event to air on Disney+ in the Philippines before it too merged under Netflix on January 1, 2026. This was also WWE's final main roster PLE to air on Peacock in the United States, as these events began airing on ESPN's direct-to-consumer streaming service with Wrestlepalooza the following month.

== Production ==
=== Background ===
The third Clash event was held at the Paris La Défense Arena in La Défense, Nanterre, France.

Following the critical and commercial success of the American professional wrestling promotion WWE's event Backlash in May 2024, which was the company's first premium live event (PLE) held in France, WWE President Nick Khan announced at a January 16, 2025, event in Las Vegas, Nevada that the company would be returning to France for another PLE sometime later that year. On January 29, WWE officially announced through its YouTube channel and website that the promotion would return to France on Sunday, August 31, 2025, for an event titled Clash in Paris, held in La Défense, Nanterre at the Paris La Défense Arena, featuring wrestlers from the Raw and SmackDown brands. This marked the company's first event in the Paris metropolitan area, and it would also be the third Clash event, a series of PLEs held in European countries, truncated from the previous title of Clash at the Castle that was used for the 2022 and 2024 editions.

It was also announced that the September 1 episode of Monday Night Raw would emanate from the same venue. An additional five nights of WWE Live shows in Europe and three televised broadcasts of WWE's weekly shows Raw and Friday Night SmackDown preceding Clash in Paris and Monday's Raw, were also scheduled as part of the "Road to Clash in Paris" tour, concluding with the Raw after Clash in Paris.

=== Broadcast outlets ===
The PLE was broadcast on traditional pay-per-view (PPV) outlets worldwide. It was also available to livestream on Peacock in the United States, SuperSport in Sub-Saharan Africa, Disney+ in the Philippines, Abema in Japan, Netflix in most other international markets, and the WWE Network in a select few countries that had not yet transferred to Netflix due to pre-existing contracts. This marked the first Clash event to livestream on Netflix following the WWE Network's merger under the service in January 2025 in those areas. With the event being held in France, it aired live at 8:00 p.m. Central European Time (2:00 p.m. Eastern Time).

On August 20, 2025, it was announced that beginning with Wrestlepalooza on September 20, WWE's main roster PLEs would begin broadcasting on ESPN's direct-to-consumer streaming service in the United States, which made Clash in Paris the final main roster PLE to air on Peacock. This changeover had originally been slated to begin with WrestleMania 42 in April 2026 upon the expiration of WWE's contract with Peacock that March, but as WWE had done some extra events, including each WrestleMania on Peacock since 2021 being two nights, Evolution in July 2025, and making the 2025 SummerSlam two nights, this fulfilled WWE's obligations to Peacock early for the main roster PLEs, allowing them to switch to ESPN sooner; Peacock still aired NXT's PLEs until March 2026, with some other content, such as Saturday Night's Main Event, remaining on the service until at least 2029.

=== Storylines ===
The event included six matches that resulted from scripted storylines. Results were predetermined by WWE's writers on the Raw and SmackDown brands, while storylines were produced on WWE's weekly television shows, Monday Night Raw and Friday Night SmackDown.

At Money in the Bank on June 7, a villainous John Cena and Logan Paul teamed together in a losing effort. On the August 8 episode of SmackDown, after turning face the previous week, a now heroic Cena reflected over his career and subsequently issued an open challenge, which was answered by Paul. After an exchange of words, Cena wanted to face Paul on that night's episode, which Paul refused, instead challenging Cena to a match at Clash in Paris that Cena accepted.

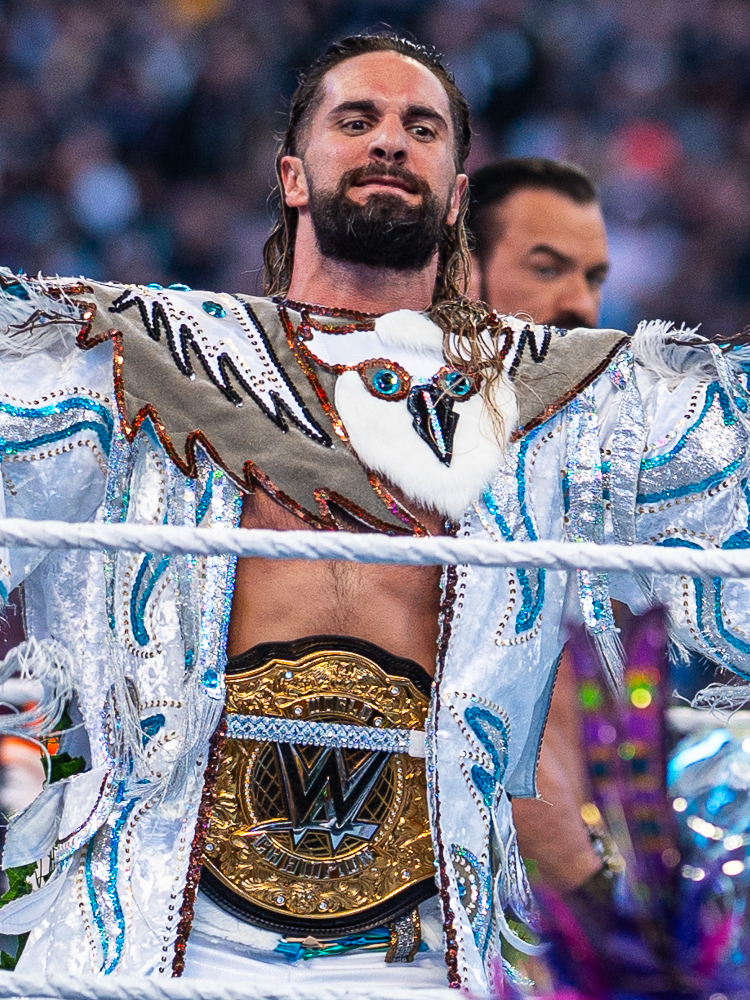
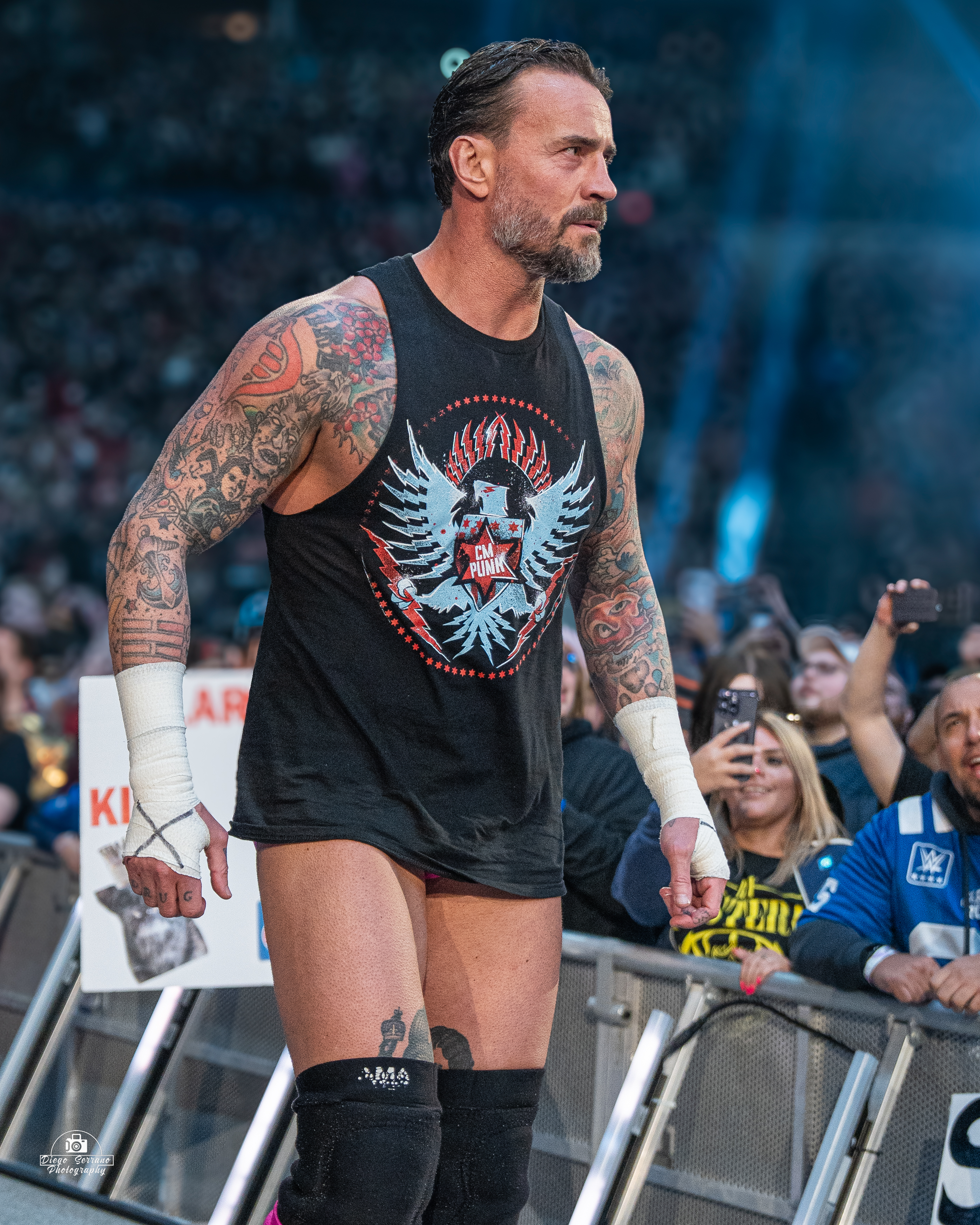
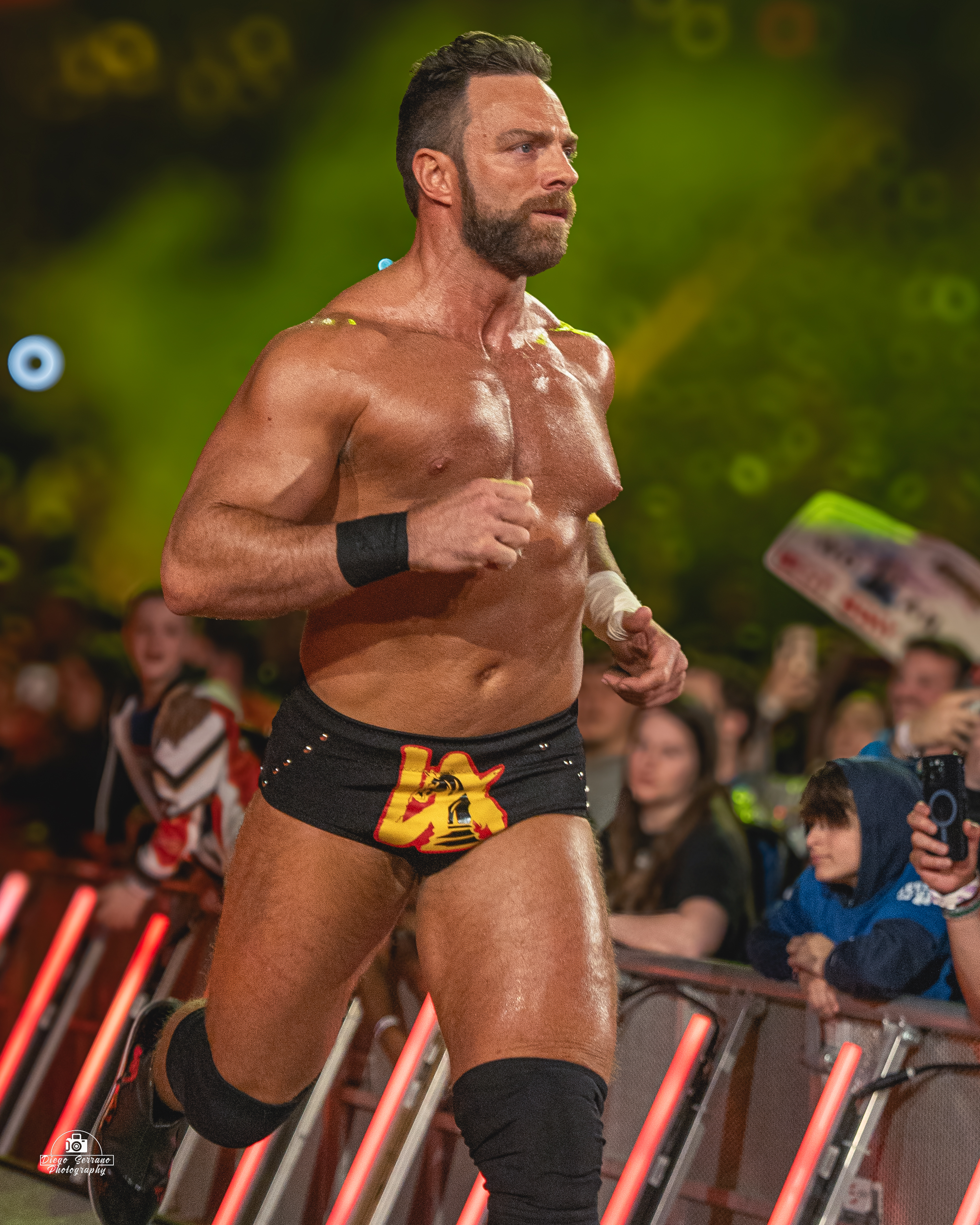
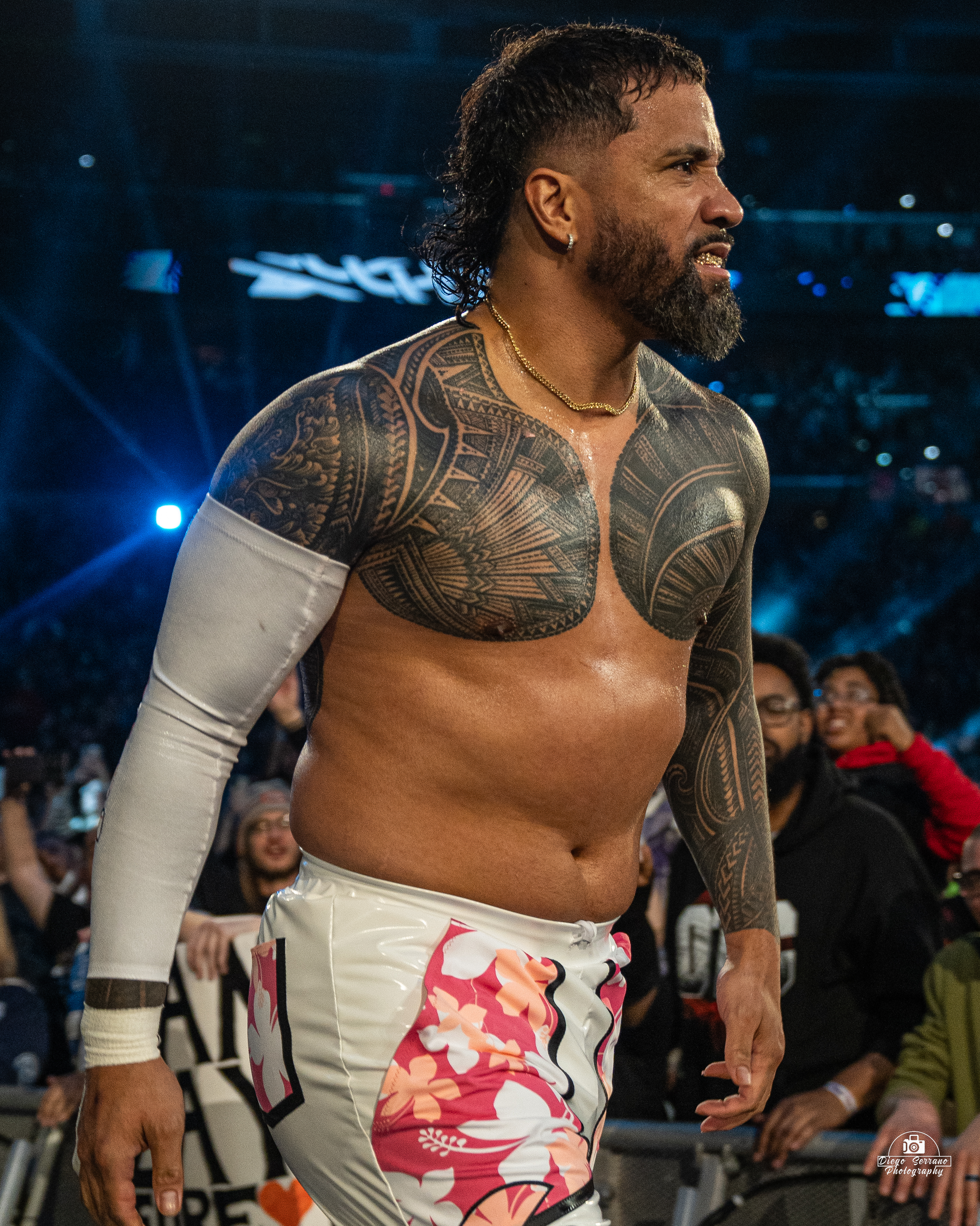
In the main event, Seth Rollins defended Raw's World Heavyweight Championship against CM Punk, LA Knight, and Jey Uso in a fatal four-way match.

In June, Seth Rollins began feuding with LA Knight, with both competing in the Money in the Bank ladder match at the eponymous event, where Rollins won the briefcase after Rollins's stablemates Bron Breakker and Bronson Reed interfered. Knight and Rollins continued feuding, leading to a match at Saturday Night's Main Event XL, where Knight won after Rollins seemingly injured his knee. After that, Breakker competed in a number one contender's gauntlet match for a World Heavyweight Championship match at SummerSlam. During the match, Breakker eliminated all competitors, including Knight and Jey Uso, who also had his own problems with Rollins's group since after WrestleMania 41, and also wanted to win back the World Heavyweight Championship he had lost back in June. However, Breakker was eliminated by Rollins's rival CM Punk, who earned the title match. On Night 1 of SummerSlam, Uso teamed with his cousin Roman Reigns to defeat Breakker and Reed in a tag team match, while later that night in the main event, Punk won the World Heavyweight Championship, only for Rollins to appear and reveal he had feigned his knee injury and subsequently cashed-in his Money in the Bank contract on Punk to win the championship. On the following episode of Raw, Rollins's group name was revealed as The Vision, and later that evening, Knight faced Rollins for the championship with Breakker and Reed banned from ringside, but it ended in a disqualification win for Rollins after Punk attacked him. The Vision subsequently got the upper hand on Punk and Knight. The following episode, Punk and Knight defeated Breakker and Reed by disqualification after Rollins attacked Punk. Uso then appeared to help Knight and Punk, brawling with The Vision. Raw General Manager Adam Pearce then announced that Rollins would defend the championship against Punk, Knight, and Uso in a fatal four-way match at Clash in Paris.

On the May 26 episode of Raw, after Rusev defeated Akira Tozawa, Rusev continued to attack Tozawa, with Sheamus making the save. Three weeks later, both Rusev and Sheamus competed in a King of the Ring tournament fatal-four way qualifying match, but neither won. They subsequently faced each other on the June 30 episode, where Rusev won, with a rematch taking place on the July 21 episode that Sheamus won. A third match between them took place on the August 4 episode, which ended in a double countout. On the August 18 episode, after several confrontations, Raw General Manager Adam Pearce announced that Sheamus and Rusev would face each other in a Good Ol' Fashioned Donnybrook match at Clash in Paris.

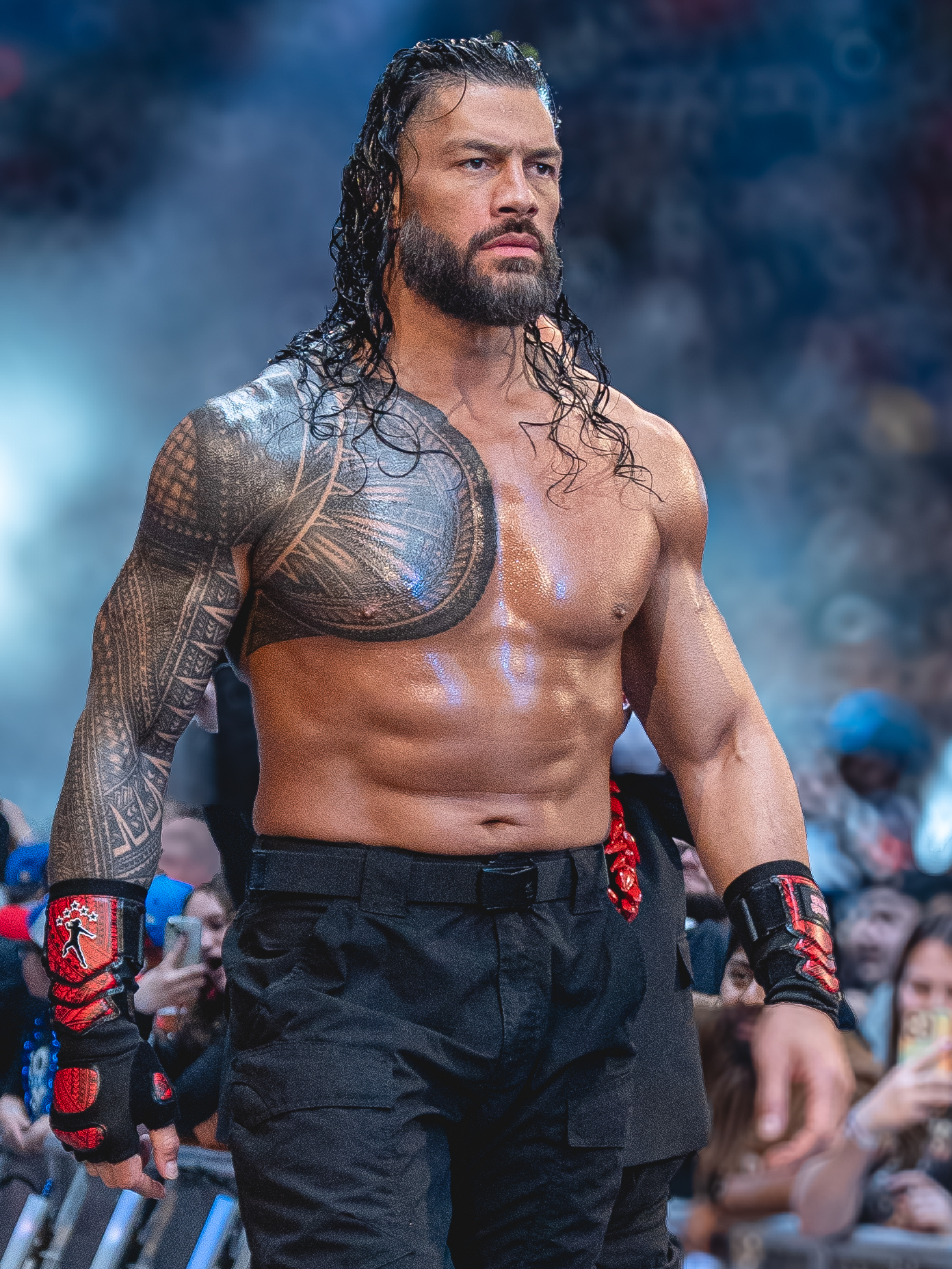
Roman Reigns (pictured) faced Bronson Reed in the opening contest.

At Survivor Series: WarGames in November 2024, Roman Reigns and Bronson Reed were both a part of the men's WarGames match, where Reigns's team defeated Reed's team. Reed would take a hiatus due to an injury he sustained during the match, while Reigns would go on to main event Night 1 of WrestleMania 41 in April 2025, where Reigns was defeated by Seth Rollins in a triple threat match also involving CM Punk after Paul Heyman betrayed Reigns and Punk. Two nights later on Raw, Bron Breakker joined Rollins and Heyman's alliance and attacked Reigns, taking him out indefinitely. During this time, at Saturday Night's Main Event XXXIX, Reed was also recruited into Rollins's group. Reigns returned on the July 14 episode of Raw, saving Punk and his cousin Jey Uso from a post-match assault by Reed and Breakker. Reigns and Uso subsequently defeated both Reed and Breakker in a tag team match at Night 1 of SummerSlam. Two nights later on Raw, Reigns was viciously attacked by Rollins's group, now known as The Vision, with Reed stealing Reigns's shoes after the assault, something Reed had also done a few weeks prior. Two weeks later on the August 18 episode, Reed and Rollins attempted to interfere in an Extreme Rules match between Uso and Breakker, only for Reigns to come out and thwart them, helping Uso defeat Breakker. After that, Reigns challenged Reed to a match at Clash in Paris, which Reed accepted. The match was subsequently made official by Raw General Manager Adam Pearce.

On the August 4 episode of Raw, Becky Lynch gloated over her successful defense of the WWE Women's Intercontinental Championship at SummerSlam, before being interrupted by Nikki Bella, who called Lynch a disappointment. After some exchange of words, Lynch punched Bella. Two weeks later, Lynch successfully defended the title against Natalya, who had taken issues with Lynch after her disrespect of Bella. After the match, Lynch attacked Natalya, but Bella appeared to make the save. On the next episode, Bella and Lynch engaged in another verbal confrontation, with Bella challenging Lynch for a match with the title on the line, which Lynch initially refused; however, she eventually agreed to defend the title against Bella at Clash in Paris.

On the July 11 episode of SmackDown, The Wyatt Sicks (Dexter Lumis and Joe Gacy) defeated The Street Profits (Angelo Dawkins and Montez Ford) to win the WWE Tag Team Championship. After that, The Street Profits vowed to regain the championship, and they competed in a Six-Pack Tables, Ladders, and Chairs match for the title at Night 2 of SummerSlam, where The Wyatt Sicks retained. On the subsequent episodes of SmackDown, both Melo Don't Miz (Carmelo Hayes and The Miz) and The Street Profits won their respective tag team matches; this led to a match between them on the August 29 episode in which the winning team would earn a WWE Tag Team Championship match. There, The Wyatt Sicks (Lumis, Gacy, Uncle Howdy, Erick Rowan, and Nikki Cross) distracted Miz, allowing The Street Profits to win the match and challenge Lumis and Gacy for the championship at Clash in Paris.

==== Cancelled match ====
At the all-women's event Evolution, Raw's Stephanie Vaquer won the Evolution Battle Royal to earn a women's world championship match at Clash in Paris. The next night on Raw, it was confirmed that the match would be for Raw's Women's World Championship. Subsequently at SummerSlam the following month, Naomi retained the title, thus confirming that Naomi would defend the Women's World Championship against Vaquer at Clash in Paris. However, on the August 18 episode of Raw, Naomi had to relinquish the title due to maternity leave as Naomi announced she was pregnant with her first child. The following week, Raw General Manager Adam Pearce announced that there would not be a match for the vacant Women's World Championship at Clash in Paris, and instead, Vaquer would challenge a to be announced opponent at a later date to determine the new champion. Vaquer's opponent was confirmed as Iyo Sky with the title match taking place at Wrestlepalooza on September 20.

== Event ==
Other on-screen personnel
Role:	Name:
English commentators	Michael Cole
English commentators	Wade Barrett
Spanish commentators	Marcelo Rodríguez
Spanish commentators	Jerry Soto
French commentators	Christophe Agius
French commentators	Philippe Chéreau
Ring announcer	Alicia Taylor
Referees	Danilo Anfibio
Referees	Shawn Bennett
Referees	Jessika Carr
Referees	Daphanie LaShaunn
Referees	Chad Patton
Interviewer	Cathy Kelley
Pre-show panel	Michael Cole
Pre-show panel	Wade Barrett
Pre-show panel	Jackie Redmond
Pre-show panel	Big E
Pre-show panel	Peter Rosenberg

=== Preliminary matches ===
The PLE began with Roman Reigns taking on Bronson Reed (accompanied by Paul Heyman). During the match, Reigns attempted a Samoan Drop on Reed only to collapse under Reed's weight. Reed slammed Reigns onto the announce table. Reigns responded by spamming Reed onto the ring post. Reed performed a slam on Reigns inside the ring for a near fall. Reed applied a chokehold on Reigns managed to escape only for Reed to perform a Samoan drop on Reigns for a nearfall. Reigns performed a clothesline on Reed sending him over the top rope and out of the ring and sent Reed into the ring post and steel steps. Back in the ring, As Reigns attempted a Superman Punch, Reed countered into an uranage senton combo for a nearfall. Reigns attempted another Superman Punch on Reed only to counter into the Death Valley Driver for a nearfall. Reigns eventually performed a Superman Punch on Reed for a nearfall. Reed performed a suicide dive on Reigns who was outside the ring. Reed countered a spear from Reigns into a powerbomb for a nearfall. In the end, as Reed climbed to the top rope, Reigns performed a Superman Punch and followed up with a second-rope Samoan Drop on Reed. Reigns then performed a spear on Reed to win the match. Following the match, Heyman acknowledged Reigns and handed the shoes back to him. Reigns responded by applying a Guillotine Choke on Heyman. Reigns then stood on an announce table, signed his shoes and tossed it into the crowd only for Bron Breakker to intercept Reigns with a spear through the announce table. Security personnel assisted Reigns to his feet while Breaker assisted Reed and Heyman in the ring. Breakker then performed another Spear on Reigns. Reed threw Reigns back into the ring and perform a Tsunami on Reigns. As medical personnel strapped Reigns onto a stretcher, Reed performed another Tsunami on Reigns. Jey Uso appeared, performed superkicks on Reed and Breakker, and tended to Reigns, after which, Breakker performed a Spear on Uso. Reed then performed a third Tsunami on Reigns.

In a backstage segment, Raw General Manager Adam Pearce banned Bron Breakker and Bronson Reed from ringside during the World Heavyweight Championship match and if they showed up, they would be suspended indefinitely.

In the second match, The Wyatt Sicks (Dexter Lumis and Joe Gacy, accompanied by Erick Rowan, Uncle Howdy, and Nikki Cross) defended SmackDown's WWE Tag Team Championship against The Street Profits (Angelo Dawkins and Montez Ford, accompanied by B-Fab). In the end, while the referee was distracted, Howdy performed Sister Abigail on Ford at ringside. Lumis threw Ford back into the ring and he and Gacy performed The Plague on Ford to retain the title.

After that, Becky Lynch defended Raw's Women's Intercontinental Championship against Nikki Bella. During the match, Bella applied the Fearless Lock on Lynch, who managed to reach the ropes to void the submission. At ringside, Lynch sent Bella into the steel steps. Bella then performed the Bella Buster on Lynch onto the steel steps. Inside the ring, Bella performed the Manhandle Slam on Lynch for a nearfall. In the end, as Bella attempted the Dis-arm-Lynch, Lynch countered into a backslide on Bella to retain the title.

In the fourth match, Rusev took on Sheamus in a Good Ol' Fashioned Donnybrook Match. During the match, Rusev and Sheamus attacked each other with shillelaghs, chairs, kendo sticks, steel stairs, and whiskey barrels. Sheamus performed the Ten Beats of the Bodhran on Rusev while Rusev was laying on a whiskey barrel. Rusev attempted to escape into the crowd, however, Sheamus intercepted Rusev with a shillelagh and performed the Ten Beats of the Bodhran on Rusev again. Rusev attacked Sheamus with the steel steps and performed a bodyslam on Sheamus through a bar cabinet. While both combatants were perched atop some whiskey barrels, Rusev applied the Accolade on Sheamus who countered into a White Noise on Rusev off a whiskey barrel through tables. Inside the ring, Sheamus performed a Brogue Kick on Rusev for a nearfall. Rusev performed a Matchka Kick on Sheamus and struck Sheamus' back with a shillelagh for a nearfall. In the closing moments, Rusev applied the Accolade on Sheamus while wedging a shillelagh between Sheamus' teeth, forcing Sheamus to submit.

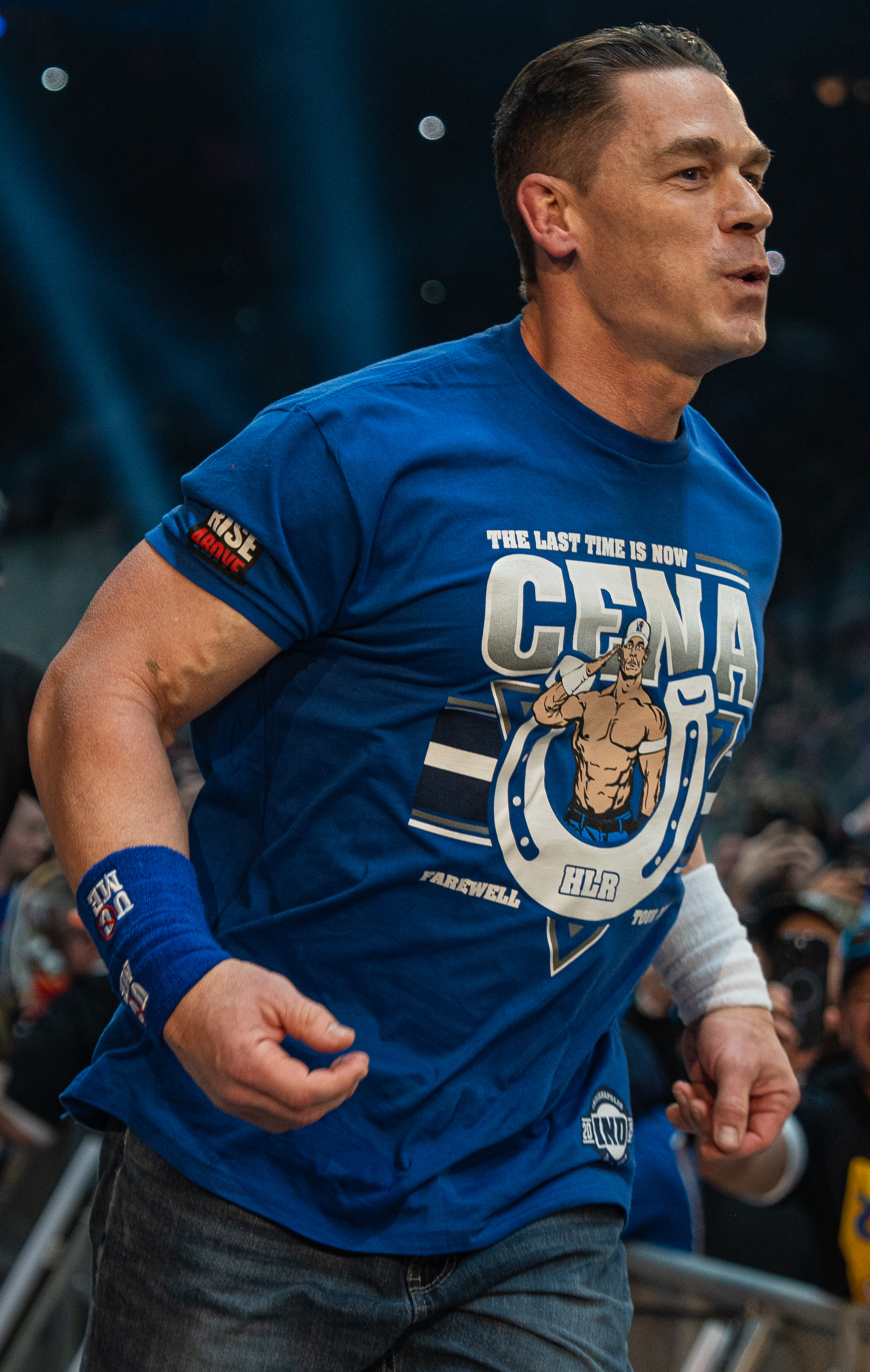
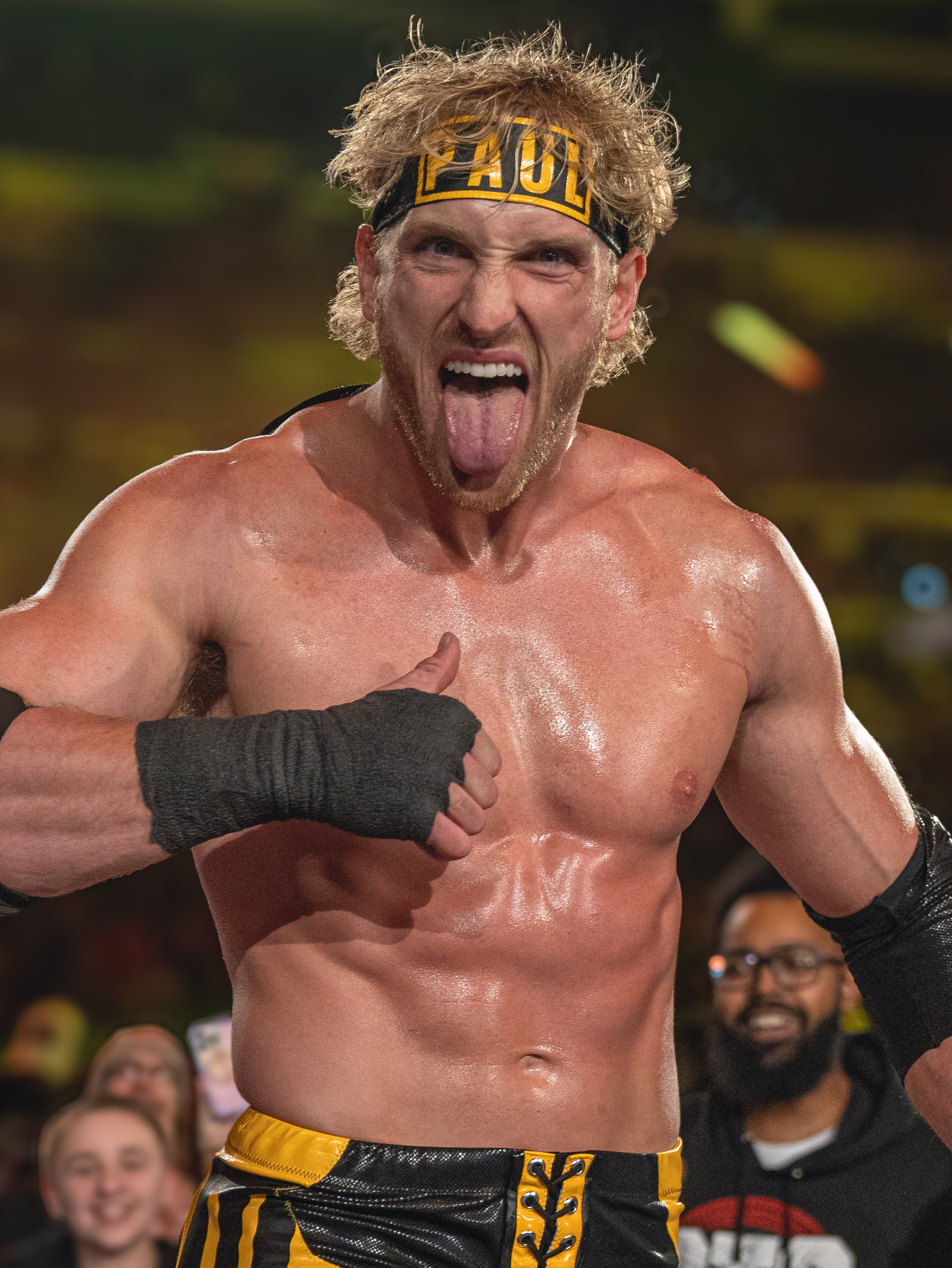
John Cena defeated Logan Paul in Cena's first and only appearance at a premium live event in France.

In the penultimate match, John Cena took on Logan Paul. During the match, Paul performed a pop-up European Uppercut on Cena. As Cena attempted an Attitude Adjustment on Paul, Paul countered into a buckshot lariat on Cena for a nearfall. Cena performed a Tornado DDT on Paul for a nearfall. Paul performed a Zig-Zag on Cena for a nearfall. Paul performed a swanton and a standing moonsault on Cena for nearfall. As Paul attempted Cena's "five moves of doom", Cena performed an Attitude Adjustment on Paul for a nearfall. Paul performed a Knockout Punch on Cena for a nearfall and Paul performed a Paul from Grace on Cena, for yet another nearfall. Cena performed a Styles Clash on Paul for a nearfall. In the end, Paul performed a middle-rope crossbody on Cena, who rolled through and performed the two more Attitude Adjustments on Paul to win the match.

=== Main event ===
In the main event, Seth Rollins defended Raw's World Heavyweight Championship against CM Punk, LA Knight, and Jey Uso in a fatal four-way match. As Rollins attempted a Phoenix Splash, Uso moved out of the way and performed a superkick and an Uso Splash on Rollins. Punk broke up the pin and performed the GTS on Uso. Rollins broke it up with a stomp, but Punk kicked out. Rollins then performed stomps on Uso and Knight outside the ring. The ending came when Punk countered a stomp by Rollins through a chair and performed the GTS on Rollins but as he attempted a second GTS, Becky Lynch, Rollins' real-life wife, ran in to perform a low blow on Punk. Rollins pinned Punk following the Stomp onto a chair to retain the title.

== Reception ==
With an attendance record of 30,343, WWE claimed that Clash in Paris had set the single event gate in this arena, beating out Taylor Swift's The Eras Tour in 2024 although the exact gate figures were unclear.

Writing for the Wrestling Observer Newsletter, Dave Meltzer rated the opening bout 3.5 stars, the WWE Tag Team Championship match 2.75 stars, the Women's Intercontinental Championship match 2 stars, the Good Ol' Fashioned Donnybrook match 4.25 stars, John Cena vs. Logan Paul 4.5 stars, and the World Heavyweight Championship fatal four-way main event 4.25 stars.

== Aftermath ==
=== Raw ===
On the following episode of Raw, it was announced that Roman Reigns would be out of action indefinitely with multiple fractured ribs, while Paul Heyman suffered a larynx contusion (in reality, Reigns' "injury" was used to write him off television which allowed him to take time off to film Street Fighter). Reigns would return on the September 29 episode of Raw, and a rematch with Bronson Reed, contested as an Australian Street Fight, was later scheduled for Crown Jewel.

Also on Raw, CM Punk wanted another shot at World Heavyweight Champion Seth Rollins for revenge. Punk was confronted by Women's Intercontinental Champion Becky Lynch. Lynch gloated about Rollins' accomplishments and what she and Rollins did to get WWE to where it was now. Rollins then appeared, inviting Punk to say whatever he had to say to him. Lynch then slapped Punk multiple times before mockingly wishing him well.

Jey Uso and LA Knight addressed their failure to win the World Heavyweight Championship when The Vision (Bronson Reed and Bron Breakker) interrupted. Breakker then scheduled a tag team match featuring himself and Reed against Uso and Knight for that episode's main event, which The Vision won. Following the match, Reed and Breakker attacked Jey which prompted his own twin brother, Jimmy Uso, to come out and aid Jey. The following week, it was confirmed that The Usos would face Reed and Breakker at Wrestlepalooza.

=== SmackDown ===
On the following SmackDown, which emanated from Chicago, CM Punk's hometown, World Heavyweight Champion Seth Rollins introduced Women's Intercontinental Champion Becky Lynch in the crowd. Lynch taunted the Chicago crowd, until Punk himself interrupted. Lynch slapped Punk again before Punk brought in his wife AJ Lee, making her return to WWE after over 10 years. Lee attacked Lynch before embracing Punk. Three days later on Raw, a mixed tag team match featuring Rollins and Lynch against Punk and Lee was scheduled for Wrestlepalooza.

=== Broadcasting changes ===
In continuing WWE's near worldwide transition to Netflix, this would be the final Clash event to air on Disney+ in the Philippines before moving to Netflix on January 1, 2026. Throughout 2025, many of the select few countries that were still on the WWE Network due to pre-existing contracts gradually merged to Netflix with nearly all international markets on Netflix by January 1, 2026. The last few remaining countries that were still on the WWE Network merged under Netflix on April 1, 2026, making Clash in Paris the last Clash event to air on the WWE Network in any country.

== Results ==
No.	Results	Stipulations	Times
1	Roman Reigns defeated Bronson Reed (with Paul Heyman) by pinfall	Singles match	22:05
2	The Wyatt Sicks (Joe Gacy and Dexter Lumis) (c) (with Uncle Howdy, Erick Rowan, and Nikki Cross) defeated The Street Profits (Angelo Dawkins and Montez Ford) (with B-Fab) by pinfall	Tag team match for the WWE Tag Team Championship	13:10
3	Becky Lynch (c) defeated Nikki Bella by pinfall	Singles match for the WWE Women's Intercontinental Championship	13:07
4	Rusev defeated Sheamus by submission	Good Ol' Fashioned Donnybrook match	20:08
5	John Cena defeated Logan Paul by pinfall	Singles match	26:20
6	Seth Rollins (c) defeated CM Punk, Jey Uso, and LA Knight by pinfall	Fatal four-way match for the World Heavyweight Championship	24:29
(c) / – the champion(s) heading into the match
