= Clash at the Castle (2024) =

WWE premium live event

Clash at the Castle: Scotland
- Promotional poster featuring Drew McIntyre
- Promotion: WWE
- Brand(s): Raw; SmackDown
- Date: June 15, 2024
- City: Glasgow, Scotland
- Venue: OVO Hydro
- Attendance: 11,391

WWE event chronology
← Previous; NXT Battleground	Next → Money in the Bank

Clash chronology
← Previous; 2022	Next → Clash in Paris (2025)

WWE in Europe chronology
← Previous; Backlash	Next → Bash in Berlin

The 2024 Clash at the Castle, also promoted as Clash at the Castle: Scotland, was a professional wrestling premium live event (PLE) produced by the American company WWE, held for wrestlers from the promotion's main roster brands, Raw and SmackDown. It was the second Clash at the Castle and took place on Saturday, June 15, 2024, at the OVO Hydro in Glasgow, Scotland, and aired live at 7:00 p.m. British Summer Time (2:00 p.m. Eastern Time). The event's title was in reference to the various castles in and around Glasgow.

Five matches were contested at the event. In the main event, Damian Priest defeated Scotland native Drew McIntyre to retain Raw's World Heavyweight Championship. In another prominent match, which was the opening bout, Cody Rhodes defeated AJ Styles in an "I Quit" match to retain SmackDown's Undisputed WWE Championship.

This was WWE's first PLE to be held in Scotland. It was also the first Clash at the Castle to livestream on Disney+ in the Philippines, Binge in Australia, and Abema in Japan. It would also be the only Clash at the Castle on Binge and the last to air on Disney+ Hotstar in Indonesia and the standalone WWE Network in most other international markets, as WWE's content in those areas moved to Netflix in January 2025, as well as the last on SonyLIV in India, which moved to Netflix in April 2025. This was also the last event titled as "Clash at the Castle" as in 2025, it was truncated to "Clash" beginning with that year's Clash in Paris, with subsequent events following this naming convention.

== Production ==
=== Background ===
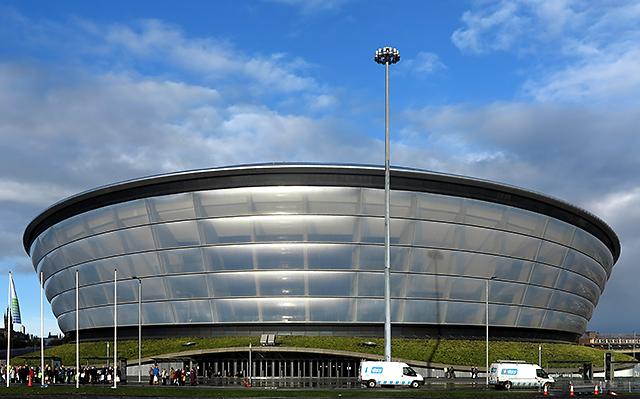
The second Clash at the Castle was held at the OVO Hydro in Glasgow, Scotland, which was WWE's first premium live event to be held in Scotland.

In September 2022, the American professional wrestling promotion WWE held a premium live event (PLE) in Cardiff, Wales called Clash at the Castle. Its title was in reference to the Cardiff Castle, located near the event's venue, the Principality Stadium. This was WWE's first PLE to be held in the United Kingdom since Insurrextion in 2003, and in a UK stadium since the 1992 SummerSlam.

During the April 1, 2024, episode of Monday Night Raw, it was announced that a second Clash at the Castle would take place on Saturday, June 15, 2024. Its location was confirmed the next day as the OVO Hydro in Glasgow, Scotland with the event promoted as Clash at the Castle: Scotland, although with no reference to any specific castle in Glasgow and instead a general reference to the various castles in and around the city. This marked WWE's first PLE to be held in the country as well as establishing Clash at the Castle as a recurring European event, featuring wrestlers from the Raw and SmackDown brands. It was also announced that the preceding night's episode of Friday Night SmackDown would be held at the same venue. Tickets went on sale on April 26 with combo packages available.

=== Broadcast outlets ===
The PLE was broadcast on traditional pay-per-view (PPV) outlets worldwide. It was also available to livestream on Peacock in the United States, SonyLIV in India, Disney+ Hotstar in Indonesia, Disney+ in the Philippines, Binge in Australia, Abema in Japan, and the WWE Network everywhere else. This was the first Clash at the Castle to livestream on Disney+, Binge, and Abema after those countries' respective versions of the WWE Network merged under those services in November 2022, January 2023, and October 2023, respectively. With the event held in Glasgow, Scotland, it aired live at 7:00 p.m. British Summer Time (2:00 p.m. Eastern Time).

Following an announcement made on January 23, this was the final Clash at the Castle to air on the standalone WWE Network in most international markets where it was still available, as well as Disney+ Hotstar and Binge, as its content moved to Netflix in January 2025; a select few territories maintained the standalone WWE Network until early 2026 due to pre-existing contracts before they also merged under Netflix when those contracts expired.

=== Storylines ===
The event comprised five matches that resulted from scripted storylines. Results were predetermined by WWE's writers on the Raw and SmackDown brands, while storylines were produced on WWE's weekly television shows, Monday Night Raw and Friday Night SmackDown.

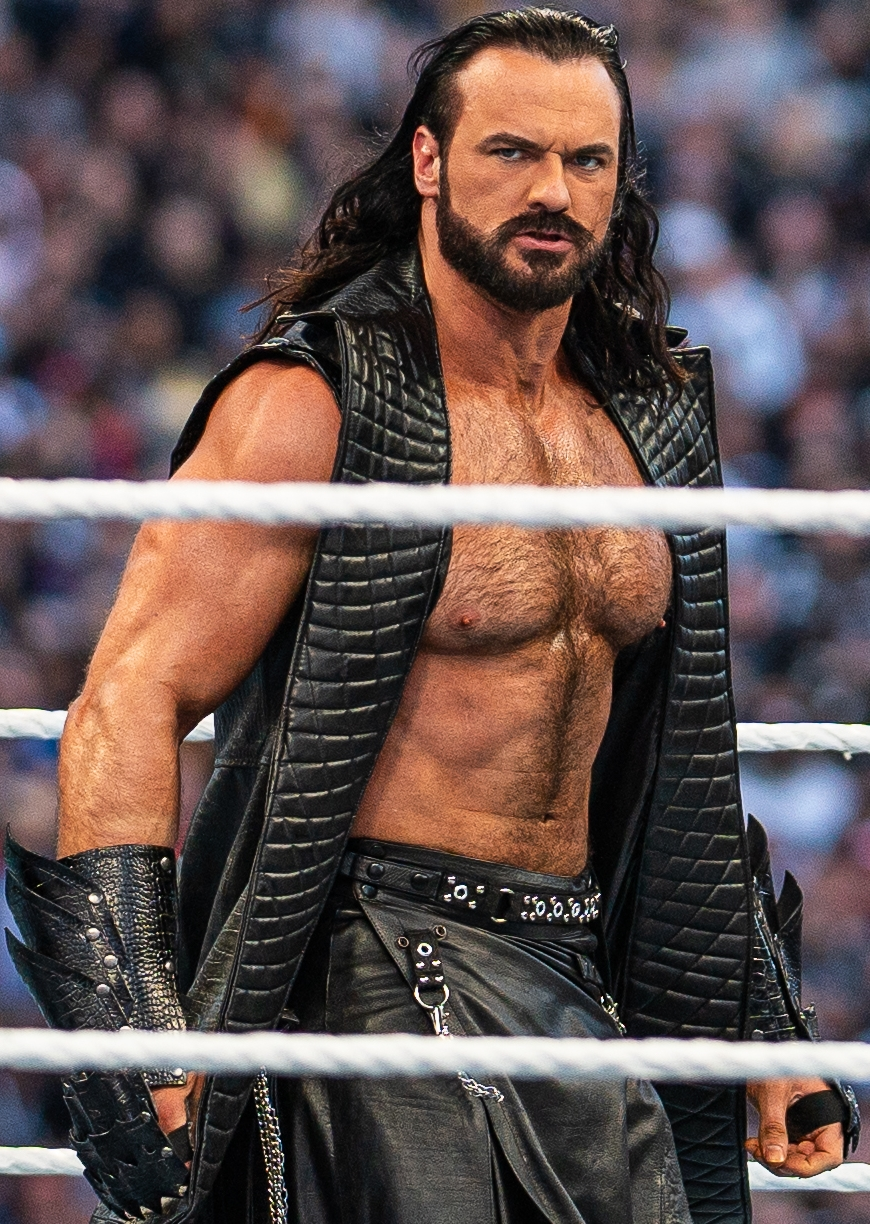
Scotland native Drew McIntyre challenged for Raw's World Heavyweight Championship in the main event against Damian Priest.

On Night 2 of WrestleMania XL on April 7, Drew McIntyre won the World Heavyweight Championship. After the match, McIntyre taunted special guest commentator CM Punk, who he had been mocking for months, only for Punk to attack him. The Judgment Day's Damian Priest subsequently cashed in his Money in the Bank contract on McIntyre to win the title. On the May 13 episode of Raw, Priest agreed to give McIntyre a rematch once he was medically cleared from an elbow injury. At King and Queen of the Ring on May 25, WWE Chief Content Officer Paul "Triple H" Levesque announced that McIntyre was medically cleared and that Priest would defend the title against McIntyre in the latter's home country at Clash at the Castle: Scotland. On the last Raw before the event, after McIntyre claimed that Priest could not retain his championship without his Judgment Day stablemates ("Dirty" Dominik Mysterio, Finn Bálor, and JD McDonagh), Priest said that Bálor would face McIntyre later that night where if McIntyre won, all members of Judgment Day would be banned from ringside during the championship match, but if Bálor won, then Judgment Day would be allowed at ringside. McIntyre subsequently defeated Bálor.

On the May 10 episode of SmackDown, Chelsea Green and Piper Niven were unhappy after WWE Women's Champion Bayley said she was looking forward to seeing Jade Cargill in the Queen of the Ring tournament; Cargill was scheduled to face Niven later that night, where Niven lost. Green and Niven continued to provoke Bayley, and a non-title match between Bayley and Green took place on the May 24 episode, where Bayley won. On the next episode, Green and Niven viciously attacked Bayley, and later that night, they both defeated Bayley in a tag team match. Later, Bayley was scheduled to defend the WWE Women's Championship against Niven in the latter's home country at Clash at the Castle: Scotland.

Since mid-April, Intercontinental Champion Sami Zayn had been feuding with Alpha Academy's Chad Gable; after being defeated by Zayn for the championship, Gable viciously attacked him, turning heel in the process. After that, Gable began humiliating his Alpha Academy stablemates, Otis, Akira Tozawa, and Maxxine Dupri. Zayn and Gable's rivalry continued and at King and Queen of the Ring, Zayn retained his title in a triple threat match also involving Gable, after the latter accidentally got hit by Otis. On the May 27 episode of Raw, after Otis lost a match, Gable said he would discipline him. When Gable was about to hit Otis with a strap, he was interrupted by Zayn, who asked how long Alpha Academy would put up with Gable's humiliation. After more provocation, Zayn and Gable brawled, with the latter coming out on top. On the next episode, Zayn called out Gable, however, he sent the Alpha Academy with a letter from Gable, who challenged Zayn for another Intercontinental Championship match. Zayn then agreed to defend the title against Gable at Clash at the Castle: Scotland.

At Backlash, Cody Rhodes defeated AJ Styles to retain the Undisputed WWE Championship. On the May 24 episode of SmackDown, Styles met with SmackDown General Manager Nick Aldis to request another championship match against Rhodes, noting he did not have much time left in his career and it may be his last opportunity, but Aldis declined, stating Styles would have to earn it. The following week, as Styles was seemingly announcing his retirement, he called out Rhodes for a passing of the torch moment; however, after celebrating, Styles viciously attacked Rhodes. On the next episode, angered at Styles, Rhodes accepted Styles's challenge for another championship match at Clash at the Castle: Scotland, but as an "I Quit" match and Aldis made it official.

On the May 20 episode of Raw, Shayna Baszler and Zoey Stark won a fatal four-way tag team match to become the number one contenders for Bianca Belair and Jade Cargill's WWE Women's Tag Team Championship. The following week, The Unholy Union (Alba Fyre and Isla Dawn) mocked Baszler and Stark, saying that they had never beat them. On the next episode of Raw, Baszler and Stark called out Belair and Cargill. After some mocking, the title match took place, but ended in a disqualification win for Belair and Cargill after Unholy Union interfered. On that week's SmackDown, a brawl broke out between the three teams. Later, Belair and Cargill spoke with SmackDown General Manager Nick Aldis and announced that they would defend the Women's Tag Team Championship in a triple threat tag team match against Baszler and Stark, and The Unholy Union, in the latter team's home country at Clash at the Castle: Scotland.

== Event ==
Other on-screen personnel
Role:	Name:
English commentators	Michael Cole
English commentators	Corey Graves
English commentators	Wade Barrett
Spanish commentators	Marcelo Rodríguez
Spanish commentators	Jerry Soto
Ring announcer	Samantha Irvin
Referees	Jessika Carr
Referees	Dan Engler
Referees	Eddie Orengo
Referees	Charles Robinson
Interviewer	Cathy Kelley
Pre-show panel	Jackie Redmond
Pre-show panel	Big E
Pre-show panel	Kevin Owens

=== Preliminary matches ===
The PLE opened with Cody Rhodes defending the Undisputed WWE Championship against AJ Styles in an "I Quit" match. Cody Rhodes started the match off with a flurry of strikes until Styles countered a Disaster Kick into an Atomic Drop. The brawl extended beyond the ring, spilling into the backstage area, before eventually returning to ringside. During the match, after handcuffing Rhodes, Styles taunted Rhodes' mother (Michelle Rhodes) in the crowd, prompting her to slap Styles in the face. Freeing himself from the handcuffs, Rhodes put the Cody Cutter and three Cross Rhodes on Styles, handcuffed Styles to the turnbuckle ropes and picked up the steel steps coming towards Styles. Styles, alarmed, then screamed "I quit", causing Rhodes to pick up the victory and retain his title. After the match, Rhodes hit Styles with the steel steps. Solo Sikoa and The Bloodline attacked Rhodes before Randy Orton and Kevin Owens stormed in to fight off the Bloodline.

In the second match, Bianca Belair and Jade Cargill defended the WWE Women's Tag Team Championship against Shayna Baszler and Zoey Stark and Scotland natives Alba Fyre and Isla Dawn, collectively known as the Unholy Union. In the closing moments, Belair and Cargill connected with the DDT/Wheelbarrow Suplex combination to Baszler, but Dawn pushed Cargill out of the way and pinned Baszler to win the titles. After the match, Fyre and Dawn celebrated with their hometown crowd as well as their families who sat in the front row.

In the third match, Sami Zayn defended his Intercontinental Championship against Chad Gable (accompanied by his Alpha Academy stablemates, Otis and Maxxine Dupri). In the closing moments, Gable put the Ankle Lock on Zayn, but inadvertently chop blocked Dupri on her injured leg. Otis picked up Dupri and walked away from Gable. Zayn subsequently connected with the Helluva Kick on Gable to retain the title.

In the penultimate match, Bayley defended the WWE Women's Championship against Scotland native Piper Niven (accompanied by Chelsea Green). Halfway through the match, Green tripped Bayley on the outside as Bayley stepped on Green's fingers. Green started yelling at the referee before Green was ejected from ringside. Green returned to ringside wearing a luchador mask to distract the referee. Niven headbutted Bayley, who planted Niven with The Crucifix Driver to retain the title.

=== Main event ===
In the main event, Damian Priest defended the World Heavyweight Championship against Scotland native Drew McIntyre, with his Judgment Day stablemates ("Dirty" Dominik Mysterio, Finn Balor, and JD McDonagh) barred from ringside. Notably, during the match, Priest's ankle became caught in the ropes, leaving him suspended and open to blows from McIntyre, however, he managed to be freed from the ropes without major injury.

In the climax of the match, Priest inadvertently attacked the referee, knocking him out cold. McIntyre hit Priest with a Claymore and pinned him, but with the referee (kayfabe) unconscious, he was unable to be declared the winner. A second referee appeared, seemingly to replace the unconscious but only counted to two, despite McIntyre still pinning Priest. The referee was revealed to be CM Punk, who McIntyre had been feuding with for the past few months. McIntyre, enraged, attempted to attack Punk, only for Punk to hit McIntyre with a low blow. Priest subsequently delivered the South of Heaven on McIntyre to retain the title with the referee now awake, having not seen Punk's interference. After the match, Punk celebrated with the crowd, whilst McIntyre verbally berated and shoved various officials in protest of Punk's interference.

== Reception ==
Reviewing the event for the Wrestling Observer Newsletter, Dave Meltzer gave both the opening match for the Undisputed WWE Championship and the WWE Intercontinental Championship 4.5 stars, the highest scores of the night, the Triple Threat Match for the WWE Women's Tag Team Championship 2.75 stars, the lowest score of the night, the singles match for the WWE Women's Championship 3.5 stars, and the main event for the World Heavyweight Championship 3.75 stars.

== Aftermath ==
This was the last event titled as "Clash at the Castle" as in 2025, it was truncated to "Clash" beginning with that year's Clash in Paris, with subsequent events following this naming convention.

In addition to the majority of countries moving to Netflix in January 2025, this would also be the final Clash to air on SonyLIV in India following the expiration of WWE's contract with SonyLIV with India then moving to Netflix on April 1, 2025.

=== Raw ===
On the following episode of Raw, Seth Rollins returned for the first time since WrestleMania XL. Rollins teased entering the Money in the Bank match, before being interrupted by Damian Priest. Priest showed respect towards Rollins, and offered him a title shot at Money in the Bank, which Rollins accepted. On the following episode, Rollins added a stipulation to their match - if Rollins loses, he would not be able to challenge for the title as long as Priest held it; however, if Priest lost, he would have to leave the Judgment Day. Rollins would later lose the title match, partially due to interference from the winner of the men's Money in the Bank match, Drew McIntyre, and the latter's assault at the hands of CM Punk.

On the next episode of Raw, Drew McIntyre came into the ring to talk about his loss at Clash at the Castle, before being met with chants of CM Punk; McIntyre declared he couldn't put up with it any longer, disparaged WWE, and declared that he quit, shrugging off questions and demands from officials looking for explanations. Following an attack on Punk on the June 21 episode of SmackDown, McIntyre reappeared without warning on the June 24 episode of Raw, declaring he would be entering Money in the Bank and cash in the very same night, becoming the World Heavyweight Champion in spite of Punk. He would later go on to do just that, winning the match and cashing in on the match between Seth "Freakin" Rollins and Damian Priest. However, he was once again attacked by Punk, leading to him being pinned by Priest, costing him the match.

After his loss to Sami Zayn, Chad Gable demanded another shot at the Intercontinental Champion from Adam Pierce on the next episode of Raw, who denied it due to his string of losses. After losing to Braun Strowman, Gable berated his junior members of the Alpha Academy, before Otis attacked Gable and the members abandoned their former leader. Now alone, Gable declared he would enter Money in the Bank and cash in as champion. However, later that night, he was amongst the carnage and the injuries inflicted by the debuting Wyatt Sicks, putting his participation in the qualifiers in doubt. However, on the June 24 episode of Raw, a visibly shaken and disturbed Gable declared he was still participating, and defeated Strowman and Bronson Reed to earn his place in the Money in the Bank match. However, he was once again menaced by a member of the Wyatt Sicks, this time Nikki Cross, though he was not the target.

=== SmackDown ===
On the following episode of SmackDown, Randy Orton and Tama Tonga competed in a Money in the Bank qualifying match, which they lost. Later, Kevin Owens was attacked by Tama and Tonga Loa, which also cost him a qualifying match. Also, a non-title match between Solo Sikoa and Undisputed WWE Champion Cody Rhodes ended in a no-contest after another interference from The Bloodline. Owens and Orton tried to save Rhodes, but they were all attacked by another new Bloodline member, revealed to be Jacob Fatu. This led to a six-man tag team match pitting The Bloodline against Rhodes, Owens, and Orton at Money in the Bank.

Following their loss, Bianca Belair and Jade Cargill vowed to regain the WWE Women's Tag Team Championship. They faced The Unholy Union (Alba Fyre and Isla Dawn) for the title on the August 2 episode of SmackDown, which ended in a disqualification win for Belair and Cargill after interference from Blair Davenport; as a result, Fyre and Dawn retained. On the August 23 episode, another title match was scheduled for Bash in Berlin.

== Results ==
No.	Results	Stipulations	Times
1	Cody Rhodes (c) defeated AJ Styles by making Styles say "I quit"	"I Quit" match for the Undisputed WWE Championship	27:45
2	The Unholy Union (Alba Fyre and Isla Dawn) defeated Bianca Belair and Jade Cargill (c) and Shayna Baszler and Zoey Stark by pinfall	Triple threat tag team match for the WWE Women's Tag Team Championship	12:10
3	Sami Zayn (c) defeated Chad Gable (with Otis and Maxxine Dupri) by pinfall	Singles match for the WWE Intercontinental Championship	22:15
4	Bayley (c) defeated Piper Niven (with Chelsea Green) by pinfall	Singles match for the WWE Women's Championship	13:30
5	Damian Priest (c) defeated Drew McIntyre by pinfall	Singles match for the World Heavyweight Championship; The Judgment Day ("Dirty" Dominik Mysterio, Finn Bálor, and JD McDonagh) were barred from ringside.	20:20
(c) / – the champion(s) heading into the match
