= Clash in Italy =

2026 WWE premium live event

- Promotional poster featuring Cody Rhodes and the Turin skyline
- Promotion: WWE
- Brand(s): Raw; SmackDown
- Date: May 31, 2026
- City: Turin, Italy
- Venue: Inalpi Arena
- Attendance: 12,977

WWE event chronology
← Previous; Saturday Night's Main Event XLIV	Next → Night of Champions

Clash chronology
← Previous; Clash in Paris (2025)	Next → —

WWE in Europe chronology
← Previous; Clash in Paris	Next → —

Clash in Italy was a 2026 professional wrestling premium live event (PLE) produced by the American company WWE, held for wrestlers from the promotion's main roster brands, Raw and SmackDown. It was the fourth Clash event and took place on Sunday, May 31, 2026, at the Inalpi Arena in Turin, Italy. This was WWE's first-ever PLE held in Italy and it aired live at 8:00 p.m. Central European Time (2:00 p.m. Eastern Time). It was also the first Clash event to livestream on ESPN Unlimited in the United States with the first hour simulcast on ESPN's linear channel.

Five matches were contested at the event. In the main event, Roman Reigns defeated Jacob Fatu in Tribal Combat to retain Raw's World Heavyweight Championship as well as his position as the Tribal Chief of the Anoaʻi family. In the other matches contested on the card, Brock Lesnar defeated Oba Femi, Rhea Ripley defeated Jade Cargill to retain SmackDown's WWE Women's Championship, Sol Ruca defeated Becky Lynch to win Raw's WWE Women's Intercontinental Championship, and in the opening bout, Cody Rhodes defeated Gunther to retain SmackDown's Undisputed WWE Championship. The event was generally received well by critics. This was Brock Lesnar's first Clash match and also his only due to his retirement from professional wrestling in August 2026.

== Production ==
=== Background ===
The event was held at Inalpi Arena in Turin, Italy, which was WWE's first premium live event to be held in the country.

Clash is a series of professional wrestling premium live events (PLE) produced by the American company WWE since 2022, held in European countries. In September 2025, WWE president Nick Khan announced that the promotion would be hosting its first-ever PLE in Italy in 2026. On February 18 that year, WWE Chief Content Officer Paul "Triple H" Levesque confirmed this Italian PLE as the fourth Clash event, titled Clash in Italy. It was scheduled for Sunday, May 31, 2026, in the Inalpi Arena in Turin and held for wrestlers from the Raw and SmackDown brand divisions. It was also announced that the June 1 episode of Monday Night Raw would emanate from the same venue. Tickets for both events went on sale on April 10.

=== Broadcast outlets ===
The PLE was broadcast on traditional pay-per-view (PPV) outlets worldwide. It was also available to livestream on ESPN Unlimited in the United States, SuperSport in Sub-Saharan Africa, Abema in Japan, and Netflix everywhere else. This marked the first Clash event to livestream on ESPN's app in the United States, as WWE's contract with Peacock to air main roster PLEs expired at the conclusion of Clash in Paris in August 2025. During the May 22 episode of Friday Night SmackDown, WWE announced that in the United States, the first hour would also be simulcast on ESPN's linear channel. With the event being held in Italy, it aired live at 8:00 p.m. Central European Time (2:00 p.m. Eastern Time).

=== Storylines ===
The event included five matches that resulted from scripted storylines. Results were predetermined by WWE's writers on the Raw and SmackDown brands, while storylines were produced on WWE's weekly television shows, Monday Night Raw and Friday Night SmackDown.

On the March 30 episode of Raw, Gunther saved Paul Heyman from an attack by Seth Rollins, and later backstage, Gunther told Heyman that he was owed a favor. On the May 1 episode of SmackDown after Undisputed WWE Champion Cody Rhodes won his match, he was attacked by Gunther, who subsequently posed with the title. The following week, Gunther, alongside Heyman, was about to sign the contract for Gunther to officially join SmackDown, however, Rhodes appeared in the ring and called out Gunther. Heyman appeared instead and revealed another contract, which was a match against Rhodes for the title, however, Rhodes stated that he would fight Gunther on that night's episode and a contract was not needed. Heyman then stated that the match would not happen there, and revealed that the favor he owed Gunther was a contract for a title match at Clash in Italy. Heyman then handed the contract to Rhodes and stated that if he wanted Gunther's name on the contract, he would have to get Gunther's signature himself. Gunther subsequently appeared and a brawl between both men ensued with Rhodes getting the upper hand. On the May 15 episode, Rhodes tried to convince Gunther to sign the contract to join SmackDown and also to have a title match at Clash in Italy, which Gunther initially declined, stating that Rhodes had ruined the contract signing the previous week. After demanding that Rhodes be respectful when introducing him and stalling on signing the contract, Royce Keys appeared and stated he would sign the contract instead. Gunther then stopped him, with SmackDown General Manager Nick Aldis scheduling a match between Gunther and Keys later that night, with the winner challenging Rhodes for the title at Clash in Italy, which was won by Gunther.

At Backlash, Roman Reigns retained Raw's World Heavyweight Championship against his cousin Jacob Fatu from SmackDown. After the match, however, Fatu viciously attacked Reigns, leading to WWE officials coming out to break up the brawl, including Raw General Manager Adam Pearce. On the following Raw, Pearce wanted to fire Fatu, but Reigns did not allow it, stating that Fatu should acknowledge him first. Despite a warning from The Usos (Jey Uso and Jimmy Uso) to not confront Reigns, Fatu attacked The Usos and engaged in a brawl with Reigns, which ended with Fatu standing tall against them. The following week as Reigns was coming to the ring to call out Fatu, he appeared first, calling out Reigns. The Usos came out instead, and after some exchange of words, Jey attacked Fatu, prompting Jimmy to interfere. Fatu got the upper hand on both men until Reigns appeared, and they subsequently outnumbered Fatu. As Pearce was about to fire Fatu, however, Fatu challenged Reigns to Tribal Combat for both the title of Tribal Chief of the Anoaʻi family and the World Heavyweight Championship, which Reigns accepted, and the match was subsequently scheduled for Clash in Italy.

On Night 2 of WrestleMania 42, Raw's Rhea Ripley defeated Jade Cargill to win SmackDown's WWE Women's Championship despite interference from Cargill's allies B-Fab and Michin; Ripley was in turn transferred to SmackDown. On the May 8 episode of SmackDown, Cargill returned and attacked Ripley during her six-woman tag team match, costing her team the win. Ripley was outnumbered by Cargill, B-Fab, and Michin following her match. On the May 15 episode, Cargill challenged Ripley to a rematch for the title at Clash in Italy, which Ripley accepted on the following episode.

On the May 4 episode of Raw during Sol Ruca's contract signing to become the newest member of the Raw brand, she was interrupted by WWE Women's Intercontinental Champion Becky Lynch, who chastised Raw General Manager Adam Pearce as she assumed Ruca's contract signing would instead be a "celebration of greatness". After some exchange of words, Ruca threatened that if Lynch ever interrupted her again, she would attack her. Lynch attempted to punch Ruca, who avoided it, and Lynch instead struck Pearce. Ruca subsequently performed a Sol Snatcher on Lynch. After Lynch continually mocked Ruca, she called out Lynch on the May 18 episode and challenged her to a title match on that night's episode. Lynch declined, however, she agreed to face Ruca at Saturday Night's Main Event XLIV but without the title on the line. At the event, Ruca attempted to hit a Sol Snatcher on Lynch, who shoved referee Jessika Carr into Ruca, who was declared the winner of the match via disqualification as a result. Lynch then attacked Ruca aftewards. Later that night, SmackDown General Manager Nick Aldis informed Lynch that, after speaking with Pearce and as a result of her actions, she would defend the title against Ruca at Clash in Italy.

On Night 2 of WrestleMania 42, Brock Lesnar, accompanied by Paul Heyman, lost to Oba Femi. Following the match, an emotional Lesnar removed his gloves and boots and left them in the center of the ring, seemingly retiring from professional wrestling. In the weeks that followed, Femi held weekly open challenges where he remained unbeaten. During the May 18 episode of Raw, after Femi made his entrance and was posing in the ring, he was jumped by a returning Lesnar, who performed four F5s on Femi. Later backstage, Paul Heyman handed Raw General Manager Adam Pearce a contract for a rematch between Lesnar and Femi at Clash in Italy with Lesnar's signature already on it. The match was subsequently made official, and Femi signed the contract on the following episode.

== Event ==
Other on-screen personnel
Role:	Name:
English commentators	Michael Cole
English commentators	Corey Graves
Spanish commentators	Marcelo Rodríguez
Spanish commentators	Jerry Soto
Italian commentators	Michele Posa
Italian commentators	Luca Franchini
Ring announcer	Alicia Taylor
Referees	Danilo Anfibio
Referees	Jason Ayers
Referees	Jessika Carr
Referees	Dan Engler
Referees	Chad Patton
Interviewers	Cathy Kelley
Interviewers	Byron Saxton
Pre-show panel	Joe Tessitore
Pre-show panel	Big E
Pre-show panel	Corey Graves
Pre-show panel	Peter Rosenberg

=== Preliminary matches ===
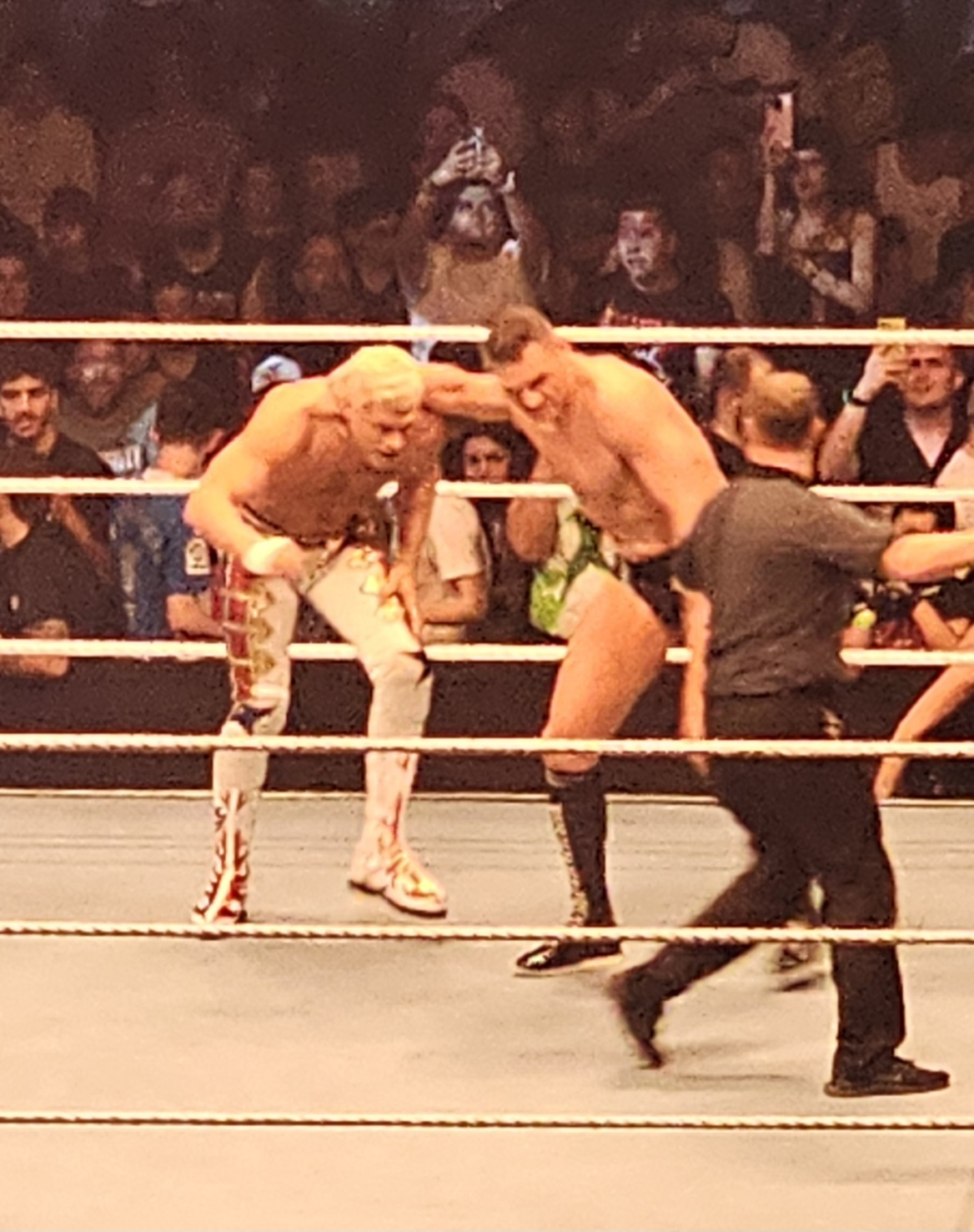
After WrestleMania 42, Gunther (right) wrestled Cody Rhodes (left) for SmackDown's Undisputed WWE Championship.

The opening bout featured Cody Rhodes defending the Undisputed WWE Championship against Gunther, who delivered a heavy chop early. Rhodes retaliated with a Cody Cutter, but Gunther countered with another chop. Gunther attempted a sleeper hold, but Rhodes escaped and hit a Pedigree. Gunther landed a powerbomb, but Rhodes responded with a Cross Rhodes. As he attempted the Cody Cutter, Gunther caught him into a sleeper hold, forcing him to grab the ropes to survive. Rhodes unsuccessfully attempted his own sleeper hold, but he did execute the Cody Cutter and the Cross Rhodes to retain his title. After the match, Gunther complained to the referee, claiming that his foot was under the bottom rope during the last pinfall attempt, which was confirmed by the broadcast.

Next, Rhea Ripley defended the WWE Women's Championship against Jade Cargill in a WrestleMania 42 rematch. When Ripley attempted a cannonball senton off the ring apron, Cargill caught her and slammed her against the apron. Cargill missed a charge, colliding with the ring post. Ripley attempted a Razor's Edge, but Cargill countered. She then attempted to execute Jaded, but Ripley blocked it and hit the Razor's Edge. Cargill hit a Blue Thunder Bomb, but Ripley executed an elevated back body drop. B-Fab and Michin helped Cargill survive a pinfall attempt after getting hit with the Riptide. Charlotte Flair took out B-Fab and Michin, which allowed Cargill to execute Jaded, but Ripley survived with the help of Flair. Ripley fought back to perform the Riptide and remain as champion.

The WrestleMania 42 rematch between Brock Lesnar versus Oba Femi followed. When the match officially began, Lesnar hit four consecutive F5s. He then applied the Kimura Lock, but Femi powered his way out. Lesnar reapplied the hold again, but Femi countered again by slamming Lesnar into the turnbuckles. Femi attempted a chokeslam, but Lesnar countered with another F5. Femi countered another F5 attempt into a successful chokeslam. At ringside, Lesnar whipped Femi into the ring post before applying another Kimura Lock, which Femi broke out of by slamming Lesnar onto the ring post. Lesnar executed an F5 through the announce table, but Femi willed his way back into the ring. He attempted the Fall from Grace, but Lesnar countered with another F5 for the victory, handing Femi his first loss on the main roster.

Sol Ruca (pictured) defeated Becky Lynch at the event to win Raw's WWE Women's Intercontinental Championship.

The penultimate match was for the WWE Women's Intercontinental Championship as Becky Lynch defended her title against Sol Ruca. Ruca executed a moonsault to the outside, but Lynch later whipped Ruca into the barricade. She then hit a diving leg drop for a two-count. Ruca attempted the Sol Snatcher, but Lynch caught her and locked in an armbar, but Ruca reversed it. Lynch failed to hit the Manhandle Slam, allowing Ruca to land a diving X-Factor instead. As Ruca was on the top rope, Lynch shoved the referee onto the ropes to knock down Ruca. She evaded a DDT from Lynch, so Lynch retreated, but Ruca connected with a handspring dive. Lynch attempted Ruca's Sol Snatcher, but Ruca countered with Lynch's Manhandle Slam instead. She then hit the Sol Snatcher to win the championship.

=== Main event ===
The main event was Roman Reigns versus Jacob Fatu for the World Heavyweight Championship. When Fatu attempted the Tongan Death Grip, he instead dove onto a retreating Reigns. They brawled in the crowd, slamming each other onto their surrounding environment. Reigns sent Fatu into the ring post and retrieved a table. Fatu then drove Reigns into the steps, which Fatu threw into the ring. Reigns threw the steps at Fatu over the ropes. Reigns attempted a Superman Punch, but Fatu evaded. Reigns then attempted a spear, but Fatu countered with a superkick and the Tongan Death Grip. Reigns escaped and hit a Superman Punch between the ropes. He repeatedly struck Fatu's hand with a toolbox, and then placed a table in the corner. He attempted a spear, but Fatu stopped him. At ringside, Fatu attempted a spear through the table, but he was speared through the barricade instead. Reigns hit another spear, but Fatu kicked out at two. As Reigns exposed three top turnbuckles, Fatu tried the Tongan Death Grip, but he failed due to his damaged hand. Instead, Fatu hit a spear. He then attempted the Mighty Moonsault, but Reigns evaded. He then attempted a spear, but Fatu countered with a pop-up Samoan Drop and the Mighty Moonsault. Reigns hit him with a low blow while kicking out at two. Reigns repeatedly drove Fatu's face into an exposed turnbuckle before landing a spear through the table in the corner and another spear to retain the title.

== Reception ==
The event received generally positive reviews from critics. Alfred Konuwa of Forbes gave all matches high reviews with none of the matches receiving a grade below B+. Cody Rhodes versus Gunther and Rhea Ripley versus Jade Cargill received a B+ and A, respectively. The highest-rated match was Brock Lesnar versus Oba Femi with an A+. Sol Ruca versus Becky Lynch and Roman Reigns versus Jacob Fatu both received a B+.

Adam Silverstein of CBS Sports gave all matches positive reviews. He gave the opening bout featuring Cody Rhodes and Gunther received a B+, stating "it shockingly let a lot to be desired" due to 12-minute match time, the talent of both competitors, and the weak finish. Rhea Ripley versus Jade Cargill received an A, which was described as a "superb follow-up to their tremendous WrestleMania match that in some ways, exceeded it". He gave Oba Femi versus Brock Lesnar an A+, praising how WWE booked Lesnar's victory over Femi. Silverstein rated Becky Lynch versus Sol Ruca a B+, stating that they delivered on a title change that the event needed. The main event received an A− as it was seen as "Another well-wrestled match between the cousins".

Erik Beaston of the Bleacher Report gave the event an overall grade of B+. Beaston rated the opening bout with a B, stating that it felt like they rushed going through the greatest moments in their previous matches together. He thought the WWE Women's Championship match was as good as their match at WrestleMania and gave it a B+. Oba Femi vs Brock Lesnar received a B as he believed that although Femi looked strong in defeat, he still should have won. He gave the Women's Intercontinental Championship match a B+, and he poked fun at the "Becky Hogan" complaints from fans. He rated the main event with a B+, describing it as a "hardcore, chaotic brawl".

Thomas Hall of 411Mania rated the event an 8 out of 10. Hall stated that the event failed to meet expectations despite being a good show. He felt the same way with the opening bout, rating it a B−. With a rating of B, Rhea Ripley versus Jade Cargill was viewed as Cargill's best match. He rated Brock Lesnar versus Oba Femi with a B−, questioning the decision to have Femi lose. Becky Lynch versus Sol Ruca also received a B−. Hall gave the main event a B, stating that it was a good, violent fight that failed to be great.

Scott Slimmer of 411Mania rated the event a 7.9 out of 10, describing it as a "solid and enjoyable show, but it was also a show that lacked big headlines". Slimmer gave the opening bout 3 3/4 stars, the WWE Women's championship match 4 stars, Oba Femi vs. Brock Lesnar and the main event 4 1/4 stars, and Becky Lynch vs. Sol Ruca 3 1/2 stars.

Dave Meltzer of the Wrestling Observer Newsletter rated the opening match 3 3/4 stars, the WWE Women's Championship match 3 stars, Oba Femi versus Brock Lesnar 4 stars, the WWE Women's Intercontinental Championship match 3 stars, and the World Heavyweight Championship main event 3 1/2 stars.

== Aftermath ==
=== Raw ===
Brock Lesnar would next appear on the June 29 episode of Raw, congratulating Oba Femi for winning the 2026 King of the Ring tournament at Night of Champions before attacking him with an F-5. Femi challenged Lesnar to a match at SummerSlam, which Lesnar accepted on the condition that the match be a Hell in a Cell match.

=== SmackDown ===
Gunther opened the following episode of SmackDown, stating that Undisputed WWE Champion Cody Rhodes cheated to win and demanded a rematch. Rhodes was about to give Gunther the match when Sami Zayn interrupted, also wanting a shot at the title. The three then engaged in a brawl with Gunther standing tall. Later, another title match between Rhodes and Gunther was scheduled for the June 19 episode with Zayn as the special guest referee. Rhodes retained the title when Zayn interfered on various occasions, including making a fast count at the end. Later, Rhodes demanded a new referee start the match with Gunther knocking out Zayn. The second title match ended in a disqualification win for Gunther after interference by Zayn. After the match, Gunther blamed SmackDown General Manager Nick Aldis for the reason he is not champion. Afterwards, Rhodes informed Aldis that he would be defending the Undisputed WWE Championship against Gunther and Zayn in a triple threat match at Night of Champions.

== Results ==
No.	Results	Stipulations	Times
1	Cody Rhodes (c) defeated Gunther by pinfall	Singles match for the Undisputed WWE Championship	11:35
2	Rhea Ripley (c) defeated Jade Cargill by pinfall	Singles match for the WWE Women's Championship	16:57
3	Brock Lesnar (with Paul Heyman) defeated Oba Femi by pinfall	Singles match	6:21
4	Sol Ruca defeated Becky Lynch (c) by pinfall	Singles match for the WWE Women's Intercontinental Championship	14:02
5	Roman Reigns (c) defeated Jacob Fatu by pinfall	Tribal Combat for the World Heavyweight Championship	27:12
(c) / – the champion(s) heading into the match
