= WWE Clash =

Pay-per-view and livestreaming event series

- WWE Clash at the Castle 2022 logo
- Promotions: WWE
- Brands: Raw (2022, 2024–present); SmackDown (2022, 2024–present)
- Other names: Clash at the Castle (2022, 2024)
- First event: 2022
- Last event: 2026

Clash (originally known as Clash at the Castle) is a recurring European professional wrestling event produced by the American company WWE. It is broadcast live and available only through pay-per-view (PPV) and WWE's livestreaming platforms and features wrestlers from the Raw and SmackDown brand divisions. Established in 2022, the event's title is in reference to castles found in or around the host city.

The inaugural event was held in September 2022 in Cardiff, Wales with its name in reference to the Cardiff Castle. This was also WWE's first PPV and livestreaming event to be held in the United Kingdom since Insurrextion in 2003, and the company's first UK stadium event since the 1992 SummerSlam. The event returned in June 2024 in Glasgow, Scotland, with its title referencing the various castles found in and around Glasgow. This was also WWE's first PPV and livestreaming event to be held in Scotland. The event once again returned, now on a yearly basis with Clash In Paris in 2025, and Clash in Italy in 2026.

== History ==
In September 2022, the American professional wrestling promotion WWE hosted a pay-per-view (PPV) and livestreaming event in the United Kingdom (UK) called Clash at the Castle. It was held in Cardiff, Wales at the Principality Stadium and its name was in reference to the Cardiff Castle, situated near the stadium. This marked the company's first major stadium event to be held in the UK in 30 years. Although WWE's last major event to take place in the UK was the 2003 Insurrextion, the promotion's last major event to be held in a stadium in the UK was the 1992 SummerSlam at the original Wembley Stadium. WWE had originally planned to host the event at present day Wembley Stadium; however, they were offered more money to host the event at the Principality Stadium. It featured the betrayal of Rey Mysterio and Edge by Rey's son Dominik, the final WWE appearance of Welsh professional wrestler Adrian Street due to his death in July 2023, and the main roster debut of Solo Sikoa.

After nearly two years, it was announced that a second Clash at the Castle would take place on June 15, 2024, promoted as Clash at the Castle: Scotland, and would be held at the OVO Hydro in Glasgow, Scotland, marking WWE's first PPV and livestreaming event to be held in the country as well as establishing Clash at the Castle as a recurring European event. Unlike the original event, the 2024 event's title did not reference any specific castle in Glasgow and instead was a general reference to the various castles found in and around the city.

== Events ==
#	Event	Date	City	Venue	Main event	Ref.
1	Clash at the Castle (2022)	September 3, 2022	Cardiff, Wales	Principality Stadium	Roman Reigns (c) vs. Drew McIntyre for the Undisputed WWE Universal Championship	
2	Clash at the Castle (2024)	June 15, 2024	Glasgow, Scotland	OVO Hydro	Damian Priest (c) vs. Drew McIntyre for the World Heavyweight Championship	
3	Clash in Paris (2025)	August 31, 2025	Paris, France	Paris La Défense Arena	Seth Rollins (c) vs. CM Punk vs. LA Knight vs. Jey Uso in a Fatal four-way match for the World Heavyweight Championship	
4	Clash in Italy (2026)	May 31, 2026	Turin, Italy	Inalpi Arena	Roman Reigns (c) vs. Jacob Fatu in Tribal Combat for the World Heavyweight Championship and position of Tribal Chief of the Anoaʻi family	
(c) – refers to the champion(s) heading into the match
