= Jackie Redmond =

Canadian sports journalist

- Born: April 12, 1987 (age 39); Halifax, Nova Scotia, Canada
- Occupations: Sports journalist; television host; writer
- Years active: 2011–present
- Height: 5 ft 6 in (168 cm)
- Spouse: Emmett Blois (married 2021)

Jackie Redmond (born April 12, 1987) is a Canadian sports broadcaster. She is signed to WWE, where she currently works on the Raw brand. She also currently works for TNT Sports and MSG Sportsnet, covering the NHL and the NHL Network.

== Biography ==
Jackie Redmond was born on April 12, 1987, in Halifax, Nova Scotia, Canada and grew up in London, Ontario. Before her current positions, she worked with the NHL, working for NHL Network, Sportsnet in Canada and MSG Sportsnet in the United States. She is a supporter of the Toronto Maple Leafs.

In an interview with Joe Vulpis: She revealed that she was cold called by her agent to organize a screen test, as she resides in New Jersey.

== Filmography ==
=== Television ===
Year	Title	Role	Notes
2016–2020	WWE NXT	Herself/backstage interviewer	
2022–2023; 2024–present	WWE Raw	Herself/backstage interviewer	
2023–2024	WWE SmackDown	Herself/backstage interviewer	
2024–present	Faceoff: Inside the NHL	Herself/host	Prime Video docuseries
