= Jerry Soto =

Puerto Rican wrestling announcer

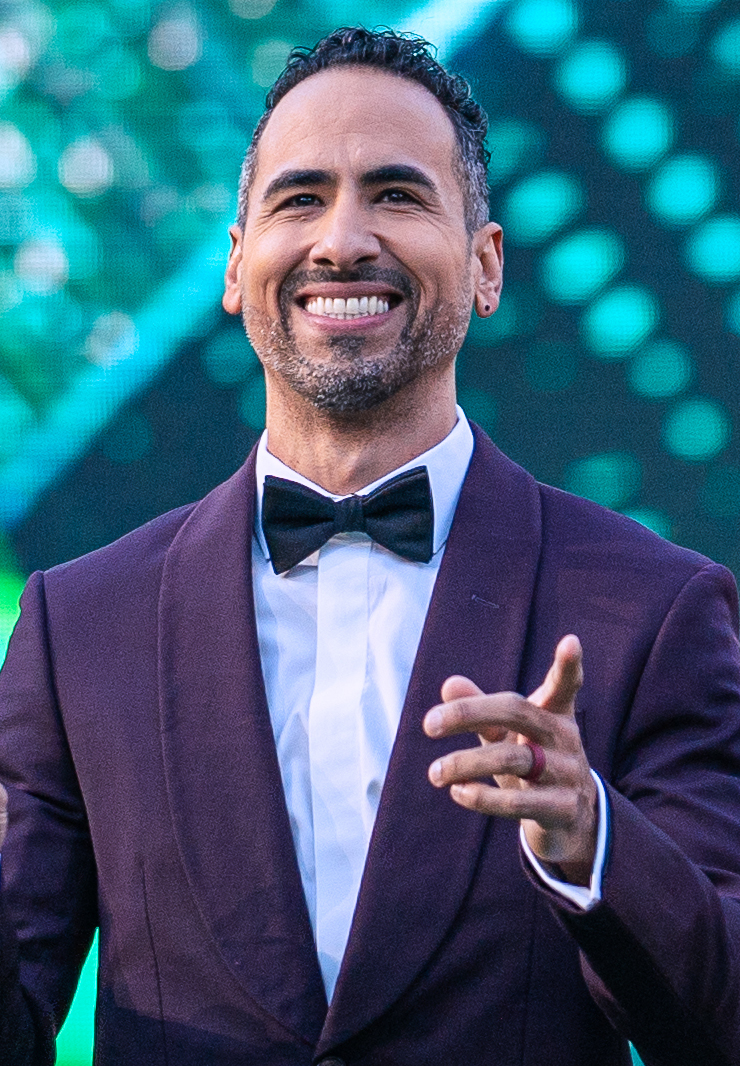
- Soto at WrestleMania XL (2024)

Personal information
- Born: Yauco, Puerto Rico

Professional wrestling career
- Ring name: Jerry Soto
- Debut: 2011

Jerry Soto is a Puerto Rican sports commentator, signed to WWE as part of the Spanish announce team, alongside Marcelo Rodríguez and (until 2020) Carlos Cabrera.

== Early life ==
Jerry Soto was born and raised in Yauco, Puerto Rico. He was a wrestling fan growing up in Yauco. He studied Arts at the University of Puerto Rico.

== Professional career ==
He was a member of the theater group Repertorio Español at the New York Performance Art Theatre where he met Marcelo Rodríguez. Since WWE was looking for a replacement for Hugo Savinovich, Marcelo Rodríguez got Soto a tryout as a Spanish announcer. Soto was hired by WWE in October 2011, but was released due to COVID-19 pandemic budget cuts in 2020. On February 17, 2022, Carlos Cabrera was released by the company, with Soto being re-hired to take his position.
