= Cathy Kelley =

American journalist (born 1988)

- Born: Catherine Anne Kelley; September 27, 1988 (age 38); Oak Park, Illinois, U.S.
- Education: Loyola University Chicago (BA)
- Occupations: Journalist; television presenter; actress; model
- Years active: 2008–present
- Height: 5 ft 7 in (170 cm)
- Professional wrestling career
- Ring name: Cathy Kelley
- Debut: April 1, 2016
- Website: cathykelley.com

Catherine Anne Kelley (born September 27, 1988) is an American journalist and television presenter. She is signed to WWE, working as a backstage interviewer on the SmackDown brand. Prior to signing with WWE, she was a panelist on Maria Menounos' online network AfterBuzz TV.

== Early life and education ==
Kelley was born on September 27, 1988, in Oak Park, Illinois. She is of Austrian and Irish descent. She was raised by a single mother, but spent much of her childhood on her father's farm in Vermont. Her grandfather, Bartram Kelley was an aviation pioneer, as the senior engineer of Bell Helicopters.

Kelley became interested in journalism when she was in high school, and started hosting for several of her school's news broadcasts. She graduated from Loyola University Chicago with a degree in multimedia journalism. She has stated that she is a member of Mensa International, the world's largest and oldest high IQ society.

== Career ==
Kelley began her career contributing to several local television stations, including WTTW, WOI-DT, and JUCE TV. She joined AfterBuzz TV in 2012, where she was a panelist for the network's recap programs of Monday Night Raw, NXT, and The Bachelor. In 2013, she began hosting a podcast called Chatting with Cathy, where she interviewed celebrities, social influencers, and friends of the network.

Kelley was signed to WWE in February 2016 and was a correspondent for NXT and special events. She made her official WWE debut on April 1, 2016, on the pre-show of NXT Takeover: Dallas. During her tenure, she hosted WWE Now, a show that airs on WWE's social media platforms and their official website that covers stories, breaking news, previews of upcoming episodes of Raw and SmackDown, and event recaps. She also contributed to Sam Roberts' radio programs on SiriusXM.

On September 25, 2019, Kelley made her official television debut during an episode of NXT. She also made a one night appearance on SmackDown as correspondent on November 1, 2019, after most of the WWE roster were stuck overseas. On February 13, 2020, Kelley announced on social media that she was leaving WWE. Her last day with the company was at NXT TakeOver: Portland on February 16. She later made her acting debut as a flight attendant on the Netflix sitcom #blackAF.

On October 6, 2022, WWE announced that Kelley would be returning to the company as a backstage interviewer on the Raw brand. She was moved to SmackDown in June 2023, and began hosting The OK Show alongside professional wrestler Kevin Owens six months later. She was moved back to the former brand in February 2024, where she stayed until swapping programs with Byron Saxton in July 2025.

== Personal life ==
Kelley is autistic.

== Filmography ==
=== Television ===
Year	Title	Role	Notes
2016–2020	WWE NXT	Backstage interviewer	
2020	#blackAF	Flight attendant	
2022–2023; 2024–2025	WWE Raw	Backstage interviewer	
2023–2024; 2025–present	WWE SmackDown	Backstage interviewer	
