= Damage CTRL =

Professional wrestling stable in WWE

- WWE merchandise logo

Stable
- Leader: Bayley
- Members: Dakota Kai; Iyo Sky; Kairi Sane; Asuka
- Name: Damage CTRL
- Debut: July 30, 2022
- Disbanded: May 2, 2025
- Years active: 2022–2025

Damage CTRL (pronounced "Damage Control") (ダメージコントロール, Damēji Kontorōru) was a professional wrestling stable in WWE. The group was formed in July 2022 at SummerSlam by Bayley alongside Dakota Kai and Iyo Sky. Damage CTRL quickly became prominent in WWE’s women’s division, with Kai and Sky capturing the WWE Women’s Tag Team Championship twice. In 2023, Sky won the women’s Money in the Bank ladder match and cashed in at SummerSlam to become WWE Women’s Champion. Later that year, Kairi Sane and Asuka joined the group, marking the return of The Kabuki Warriors under the Damage CTRL banner. In 2024, Sane and Asuka also won the WWE Women’s Tag Team Championship. Later that year, Bayley won the women’s Royal Rumble match.

== History ==
=== Formation and Bayley's leadership (2022–2023) ===
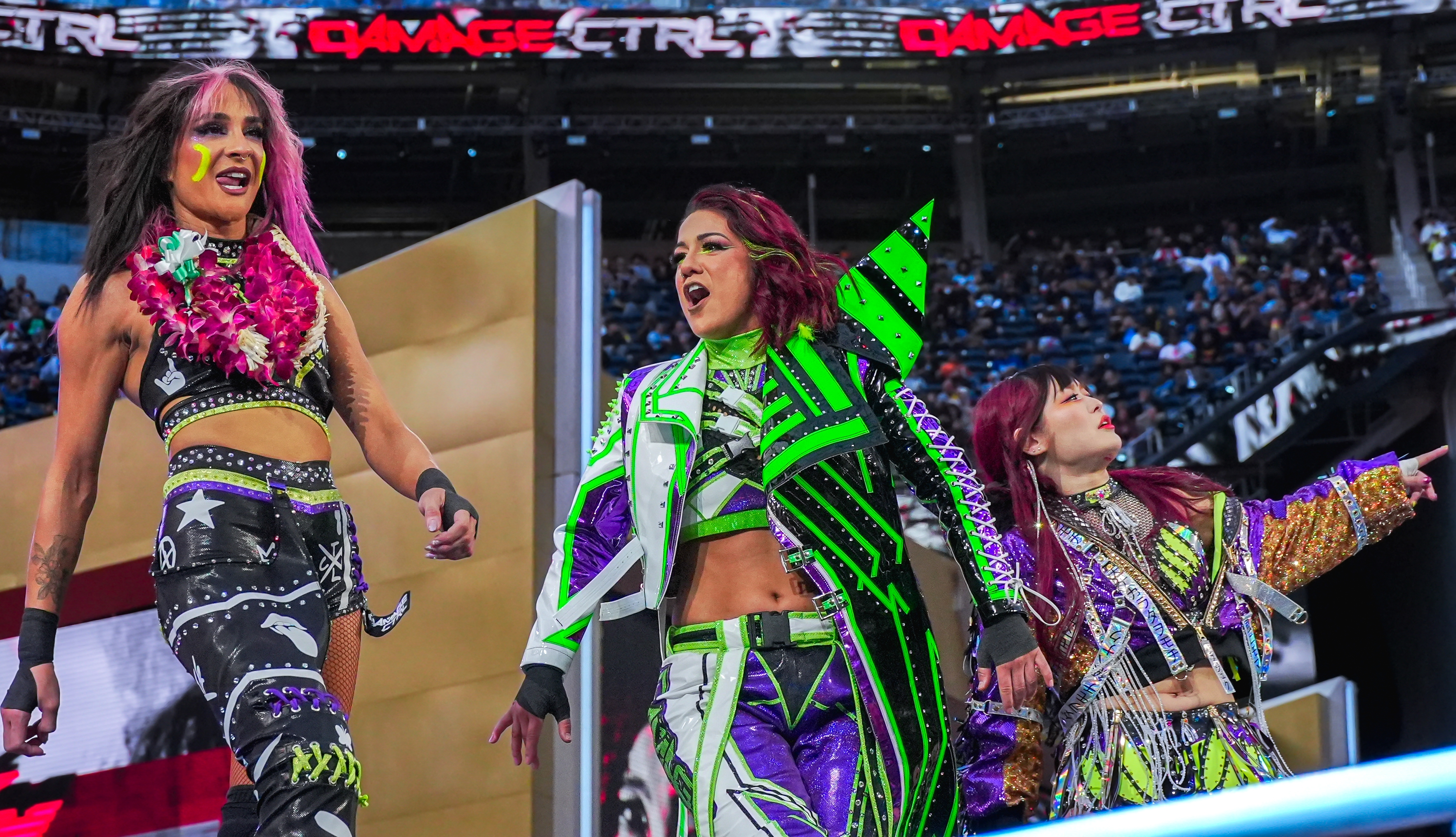
Damage CTRL at WrestleMania 39.

Damage CTRL debuted at SummerSlam on July 30, 2022, when Bayley returned from a year-long injury hiatus, aligning with the returning Dakota Kai and Iyo Sky (formerly Io Shirai), who was called up from NXT. The group confronted Raw Women’s Champion Bianca Belair following her successful title defense. Kai later revealed that the original concept for the faction included herself, Tegan Nox, and Candice LeRae.

Wrestling under the Damage CTRL name, the trio won their debut match at Clash at the Castle in September, where Bayley pinned Belair in a six-woman tag team match. On the September 12 episode of Raw, Kai and Sky defeated Aliyah and Raquel Rodriguez to win the WWE Women’s Tag Team Championship. Bayley challenged Belair for the Raw Women’s Championship at Extreme Rules in a ladder match and again at Crown Jewel in a Last Woman Standing match, but was unsuccessful both times. Meanwhile, Kai and Sky briefly lost the tag titles to Alexa Bliss and Asuka after a 49-day reign but regained them five days later at Crown Jewel. At Survivor Series: WarGames in November 2022, Damage CTRL teamed with Nikki Cross and Rhea Ripley in the women’s WarGames match but lost when Becky Lynch pinned Kai.

Following that, the group entered a feud with Lynch. On the December 19 episode of Raw, Bayley defeated her in singles competition. Kai and Sky later beat Lynch and Michin in a non-title match. A steel cage match between Bayley and Lynch was scheduled for Raw is XXX but did not take place due to a pre-match attack by Damage CTRL. The match was rescheduled for February 6, where Lynch defeated Bayley with assistance from Lita. Shortly after, Lynch and Lita challenged Kai and Sky for the Women's Tag Team Championship. Despite Bayley’s interference, Kai and Sky lost the titles on the February 27 episode of Raw due to help from returning Trish Stratus. At WrestleMania 39, Damage CTRL was defeated in a six-woman tag match by Lynch, Lita, and Stratus. On May 12, Bayley and Kai failed to recapture the tag titles from Liv Morgan and Raquel Rodriguez, during which Kai sustained a torn ACL and Morgan suffered a shoulder injury.

On June 9, both Bayley and Sky qualified for the women’s Money in the Bank ladder match at the namesake event, which Sky won. At SummerSlam, Sky successfully cashed in her contract on Belair to win the WWE Women’s Championship. Kai made her first appearance since injury to celebrate with Sky and began appearing in a non-wrestling role during recovery.

=== New members, injuries and disbandment (2023–2025) ===
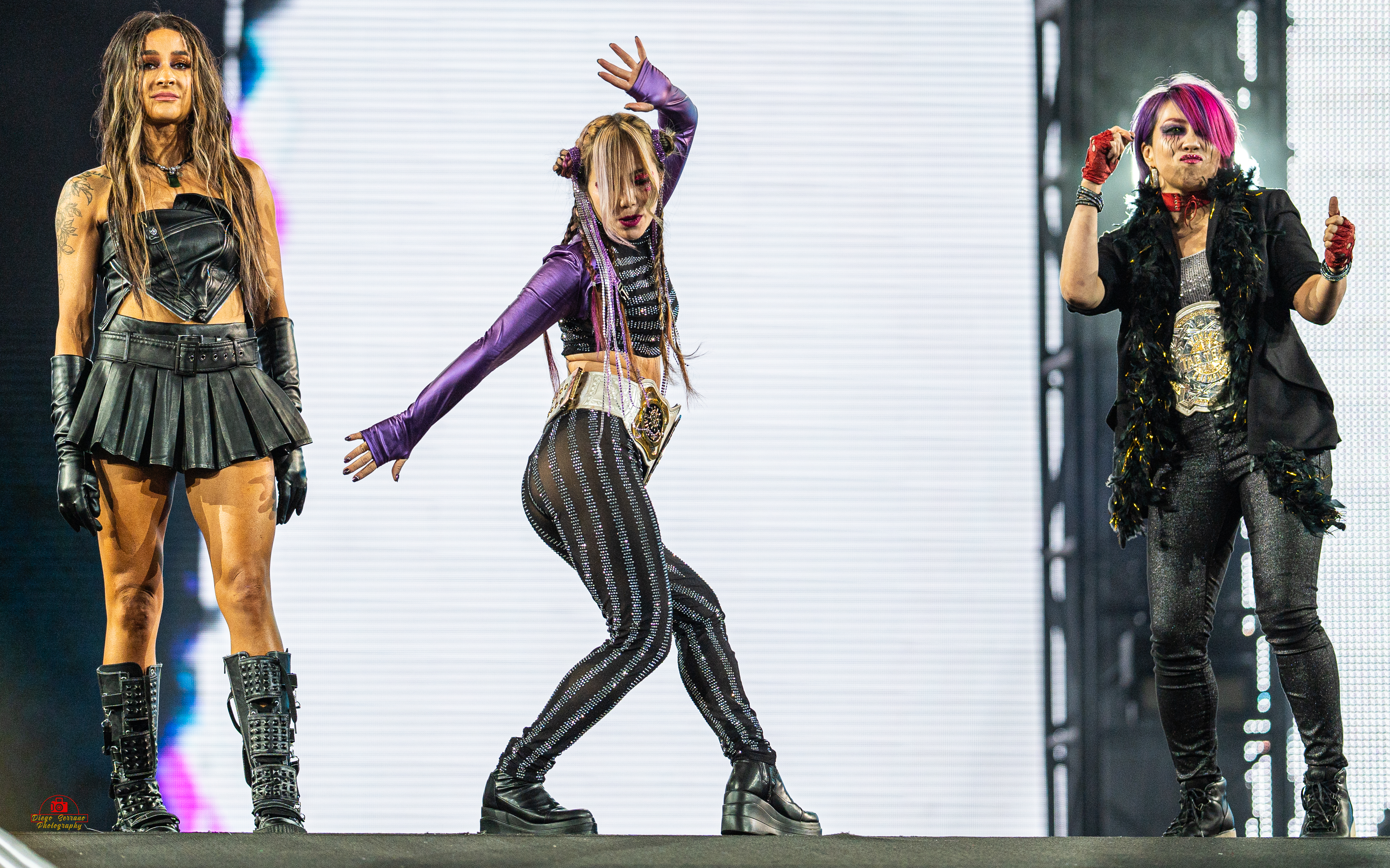
Damage CTRL at WrestleMania XL.

At Crown Jewel in November 2023, Kairi Sane made a surprise return to WWE and aided Sky in retaining the WWE Women's Championship against Belair. Sane officially joined the stable on the November 10 episode of SmackDown. That same night, Asuka reunited with Sane as The Kabuki Warriors and later formally joined Damage CTRL. At Survivor Series: WarGames, Damage CTRL lost in the women's WarGames match.

On January 26, 2024, The Kabuki Warriors defeated Katana Chance and Kayden Carter to win the WWE Women’s Tag Team Championship. The following night at Royal Rumble, Bayley won the women's Royal Rumble match. On the February 2 episode of SmackDown, Asuka and Sane turned on Bayley and expelled her from the group. Kai initially appeared to support Bayley, but on the March 1 episode of SmackDown, revealed it was a ruse and reunited with Asuka and Sane to attack Bayley. At Night 1 of WrestleMania XL, Kai, Sane, and Asuka lost a six-woman tag match to Belair, Jade Cargill, and Naomi. The following night, Bayley defeated Sky to win the WWE Women’s Championship, ending Sky’s 246-day reign. At Backlash: France, Asuka and Sane lost the tag titles to Belair and Cargill, ending their reign at 99 days. Both Asuka and Kai had to undergo surgery after suffering knee injury. The following months, Sky and Sane unsuccessfully challenged for the tag titles several times, including a fatal-four way tag match at Crown Jewel. Kai returned from injury in November but again suffered a concussion in January 2025. Sane also sustained an injury at the end of previous year. On March 3, Sky defeated Rhea Ripley on Raw to win the Women’s World Championship. She also retained the title in a triple threat match at WrestleMania 41 against Ripley and Belair.

On May 2, WWE announced the release of Kai, ending her second tenure with WWE. The release of Kai as well as the inactivity of Asuka and Sane signalled the silent disbanding of the stable. On the June 23 episode of Raw, as Sky congratulated Asuka for advancing to the Queen of the Ring tournament final, the latter declared that the group is no more, confirming the disbanding of Damage CTRL.. on April 24 2026, it was reported that Sane was too released by WWE

== Members ==
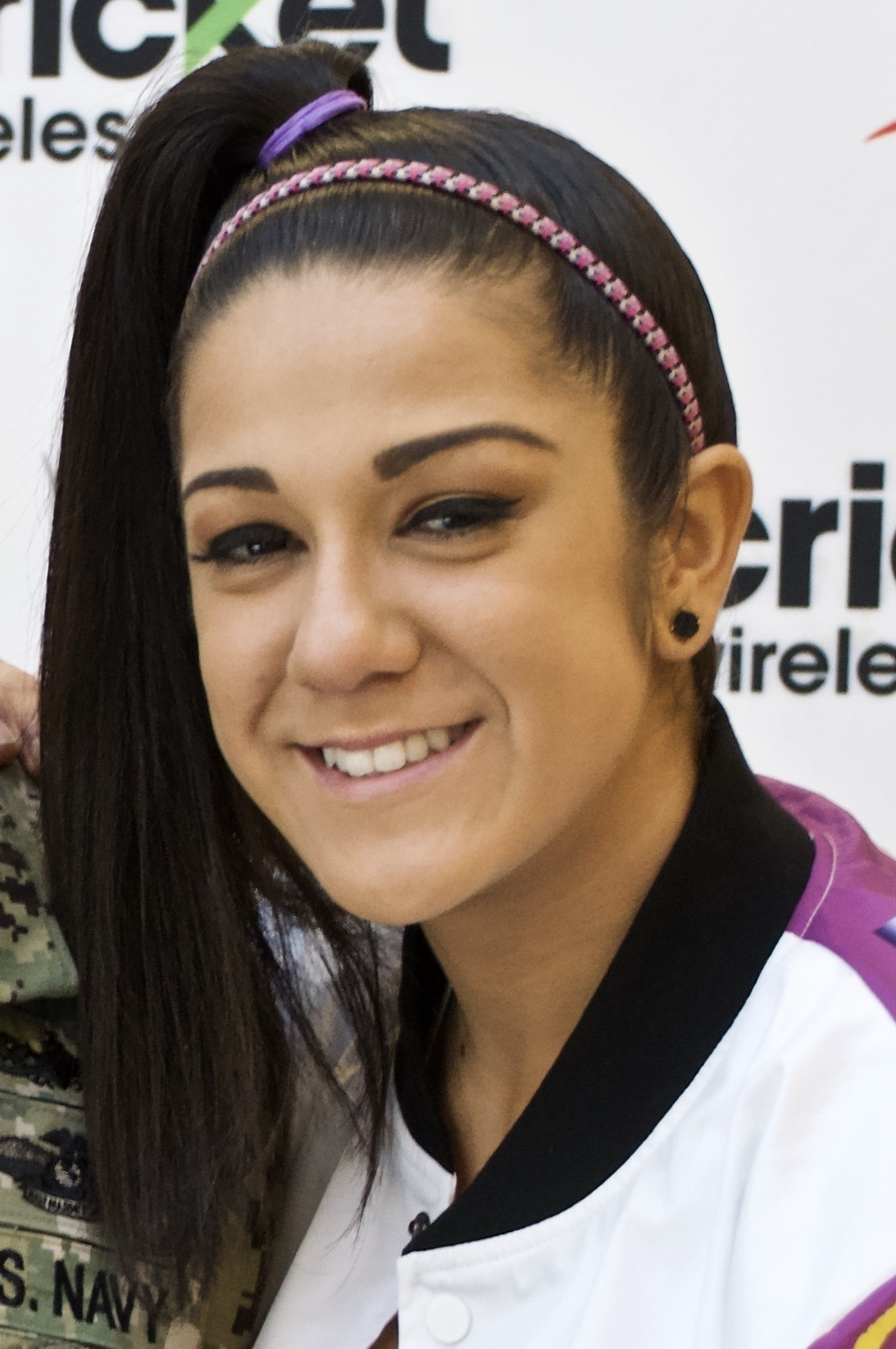
Bayley (L)

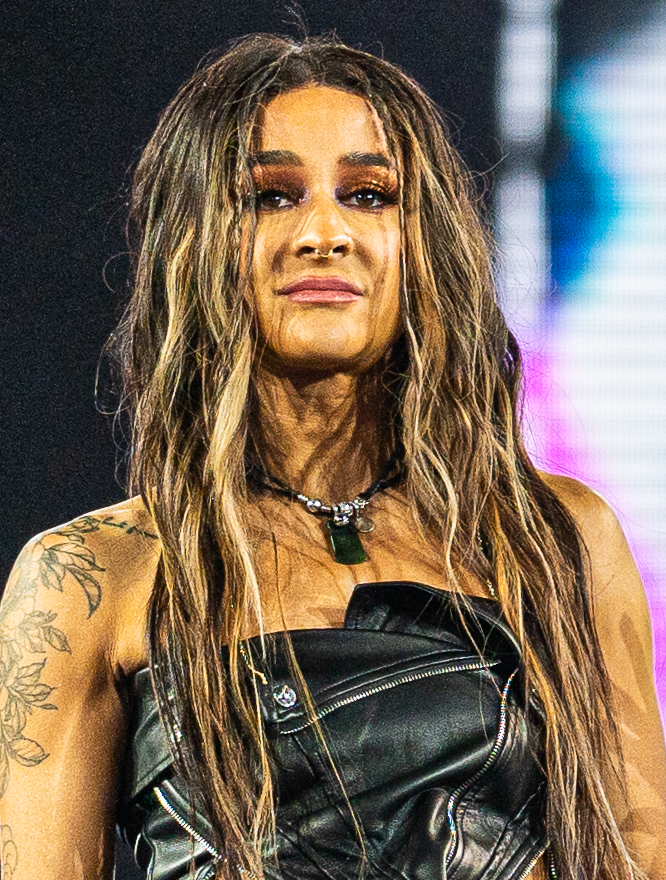
Dakota Kai (M)

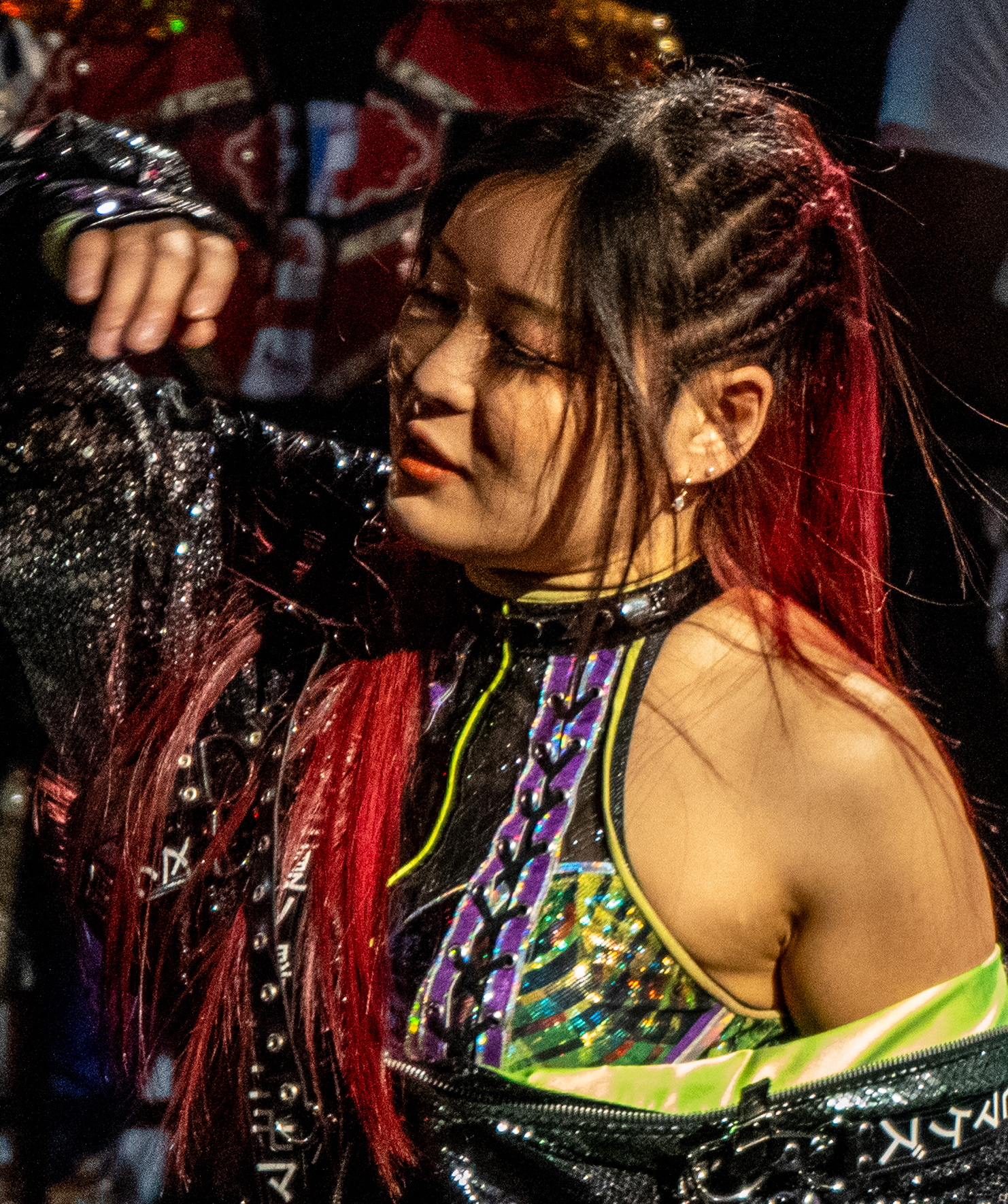
Iyo Sky

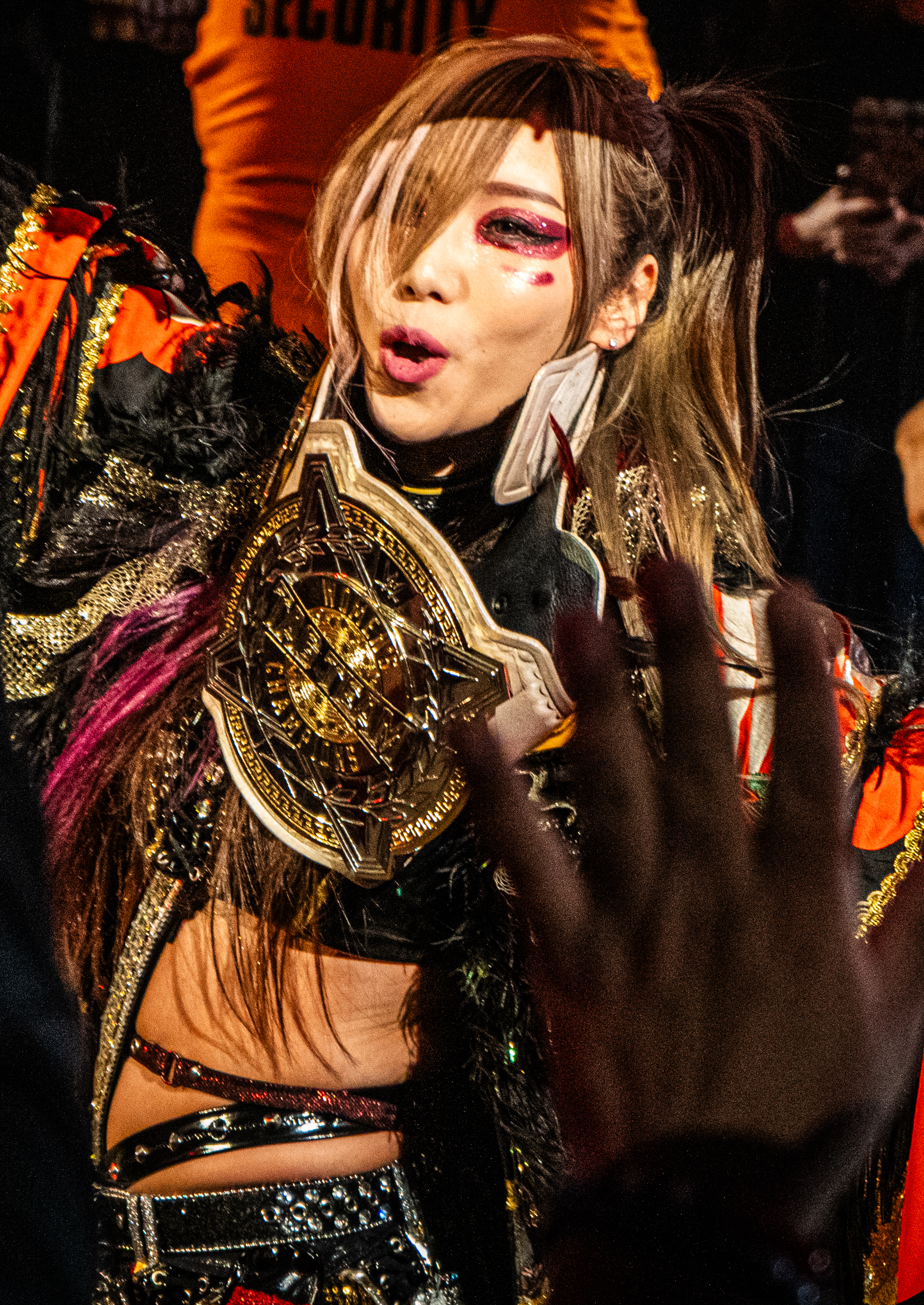
Kairi Sane

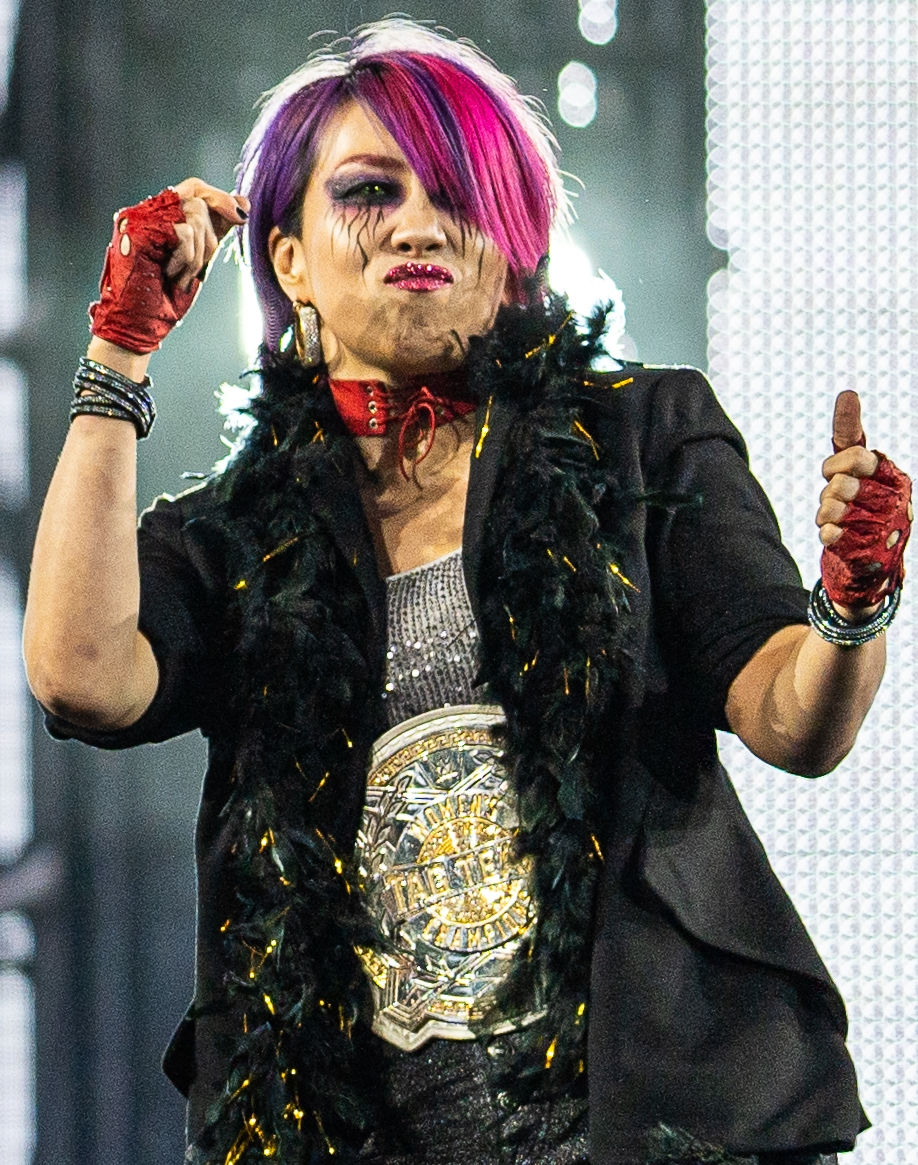
Asuka

*	Founding member(s)
L	Leader
M	Manager

Member		Joined	Left
Bayley	*L	July 30, 2022	February 2, 2024
Dakota Kai	*M (Note: During the period in which she was injured, she served as the group's manager. She returned as a full time competitor after being medically cleared to compete again.)	July 30, 2022	May 2, 2025
Iyo Sky	*	July 30, 2022	May 2, 2025
Asuka		November 17, 2023	May 2, 2025
Kairi Sane		November 10, 2023	May 2, 2025

== Sub-groups ==
Affiliate	Members	Tenure	Type
The Kabuki Warriors	Asuka; Kairi Sane	2023–2025	Tag team

== Championships and accomplishments ==
- Slam Wrestling Awards
  - Best WWE Tag Team Female (2022)
- WWE
  - WWE Women's Championship (1 time) – Sky
  - Women's World Championship (1 time) – Sky
  - WWE Women's Tag Team Championship (3 times) – Kai and Sky (2), Asuka and Sane (1)
  - Tenth WWE Women's Triple Crown Champion – Sky
  - Seventh WWE Women's Grand Slam Champion – Sky
  - Women's Money in the Bank (2023) – Sky
  - Women's Royal Rumble (2024) – Bayley
