= Liv Morgan and Raquel Rodriguez =

Professional wrestling tag team

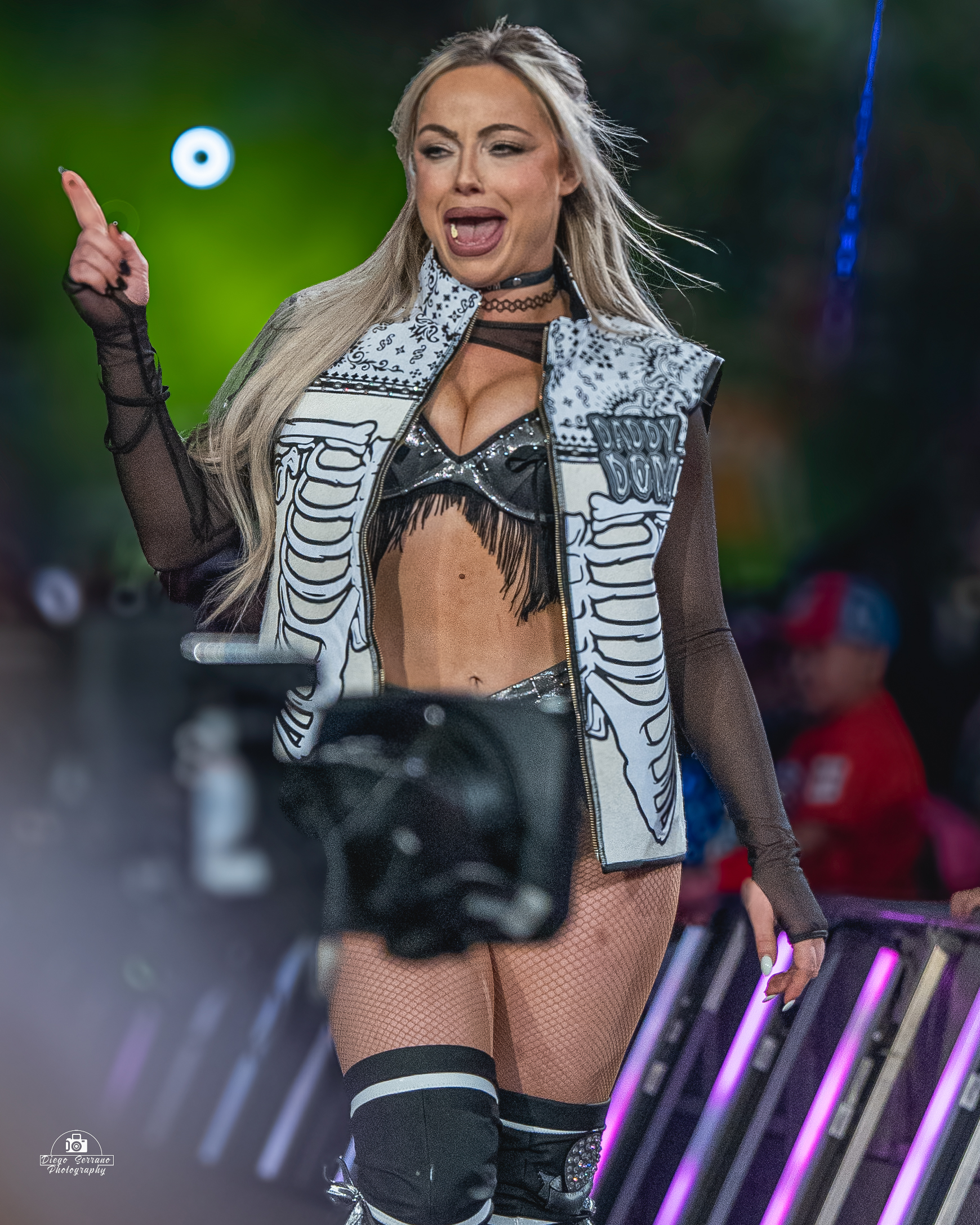
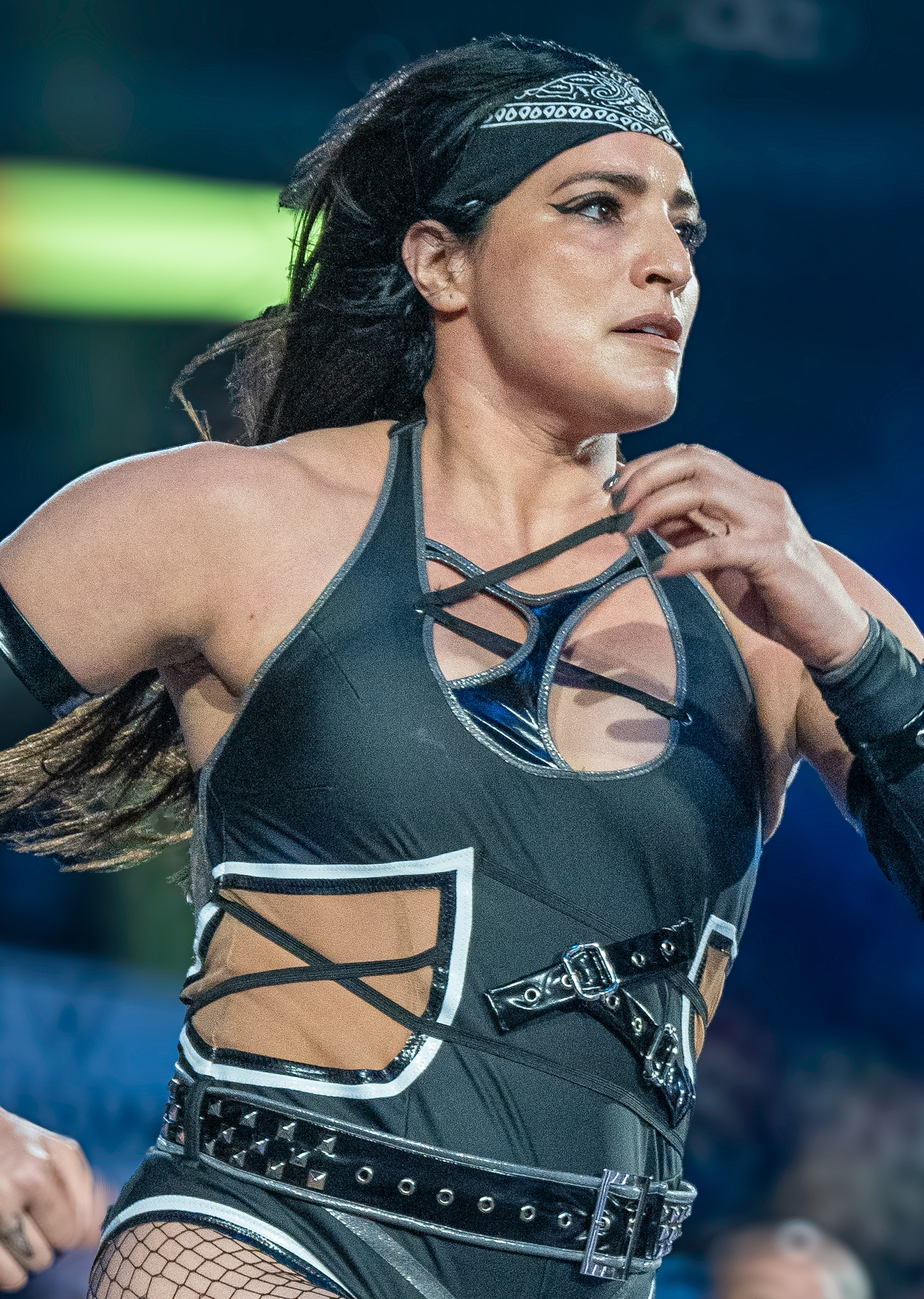
- Liv Morgan (left) and Raquel Rodriguez (right) in 2025.

Tag team
- Name(s): Liv Morgan and Raquel Rodriguez; The Judgment Day
- Members: Liv Morgan; Raquel Rodriguez
- Billed heights: Morgan: 5 ft 3 in (1.60 m); Rodriguez: 6 ft 0 in (1.83 m)
- Debut: February 10, 2023
- Years active: 2023–present

Liv Morgan and Raquel Rodriguez are an American professional wrestling tag team. They are signed to WWE, where they perform on the Raw brand and are both members of the villainous Judgment Day stable. They are a record-setting four-time WWE Women's Tag Team Champions. Morgan is the current and four-time Women's World Champion as well as the winner of the 2026 Women's Royal Rumble, and the inaugural WWE Women's Crown Jewel Champion. Rodriguez is a former WWE Women's Intercontinental Champion as well as a former NXT Women's Champion.

== History ==
=== Formation and Women's Tag Team Champions (2023) ===
On the February 10, 2023 episode of SmackDown, Liv Morgan and Raquel Rodriguez teamed for the first time, defeating Chelsea Green and Sonya Deville. At Night 2 of WrestleMania 39 on April 2, Morgan and Rodriguez took part in the women's WrestleMania Showcase fatal four-way tag team match, which was won by Ronda Rousey and Shayna Baszler. The following night on Raw, Morgan and Rodriguez defeated Damage CTRL (Dakota Kai and Iyo Sky) in a number one contenders match for the WWE Women's Tag Team Championship. The following week on Raw, they defeated Becky Lynch and Lita to win the WWE Women's Tag Team Championship.

As part of the 2023 WWE Draft, both Morgan and Rodriguez were drafted to the Raw brand. On the May 19 episode of SmackDown, Morgan and Rodriguez vacated the titles due to Morgan suffering a shoulder injury, ending their first reign at 39 days. Morgan would make her return on the June 23 episode of SmackDown. At Money in the Bank on July 1, Morgan and Rodriguez defeated Rousey and Baszler to win the WWE Women's Tag Team Championship for the second time. On the July 17 episode of Raw, Morgan and Rodriguez lost the titles to Chelsea Green and Sonya Deville after Rhea Ripley attacked them backstage before the match, ending their second reign at 16 days. The following week, Morgan was scheduled to face Ripley, however, the match never began as Ripley viciously attacked Morgan with a steel chair. This was done to write Morgan off television, as she suffered another shoulder injury, and the team went on hiatus. Rodriguez was diagnosed with mast cell activation syndrome, which kept her out of action for much of 2024.

=== The Judgment Day (2024–present) ===
While Rodriguez remained out of action, Morgan returned from her injury and resumed her feud with Ripley, with Morgan legitimately injuring Ripley during a backstage attack on the April 8, 2024 episode of Raw. In the aftermath, Morgan captured the Women's World Championship by defeating Becky Lynch at the King and Queen of the Ring event, while also beginning to display more villainous traits. Morgan succeeded in stealing Ripley's on-screen love interest Dominik Mysterio and excommunicating Ripley from The Judgment Day at SummerSlam, joining the group herself on the following episode of Raw, turning heel.

At Bad Blood on October 5, Rodriguez made her return after a seven-month hiatus and attacked Ripley to help Morgan retain her title, becoming the newest member of The Judgment Day and continuing her tag team with Morgan. At Crown Jewel, Morgan defeated WWE Women's Champion Nia Jax to win the inaugural WWE Women's Crown Jewel Championship after interference from Rodriguez and Mysterio. On the November 11 episode of Raw, Morgan and Rodriguez failed to win the WWE Women's Tag Team Championship from Bianca Belair and Jade Cargill. At Survivor Series WarGames on November 30, both Morgan and Rodriguez competed in the women's WarGames match alongside Jax, Candice LeRae, and Tiffany Stratton against Ripley, Belair, Bayley, Iyo Sky, and Naomi in a losing effort, with Morgan being pinned by Ripley. At the premiere of Raw on Netflix, Morgan lost the title to Ripley despite interference from Rodriguez and Mysterio, ending her reign at 226 days.

At the Royal Rumble on February 1, 2025, Morgan and Rodriguez participated in the namesake match, but were both eliminated by Nia Jax. On the February 24 episode of Raw, Morgan and Rodriguez defeated Belair and Naomi to win the WWE Women's Tag Team Championship for a record-setting third time after interference from Mysterio. On Night 2 of WrestleMania 41, Morgan and Rodriguez lost the titles to Lyra Valkyria and the returning Becky Lynch, ending their reign at 55 days. The next night on Raw, Morgan and Rodriguez regained the titles from Lynch and Valkyria in a rematch to become record four-time champions. On the June 16 episode of Raw, Morgan suffered a legitimate dislocated shoulder during a match against Kairi Sane, leading to Roxanne Perez joining The Judgment Day and replacing Morgan as champion. WWE recognizes this as a separate reign, thus ending Morgan and Rodriguez's fourth reign at 70 days. The team would then go on hiatus for 166 days following this event. At Survivor Series on November 29, Morgan returned from her absence and assisted Dominik Mysterio in defeating John Cena to help Mysterio reclaim his Intercontinental championship. Her return signaled the resumption of the partnership between Morgan and Rodriguez.

On the December 15 edition of Raw, Rodriguez faced Stephanie Vaquer for the Women's World Championship, though her efforts were unsuccessful when Nikki Bella, a rival of both women, interfered in the contest resulting in a disqualification. On the outside of the ring, Bella awkwardly threw Rodriguez head first into the steel steps, which resulted in Rodriguez being cut open on the forehead and suffering a legitimate concussion, once again putting the team on hiatus. The team would then resume as normal the following week.

At the 2026 Royal Rumble, Rodriguez and Morgan would both make the final four. After Rodriguez would eliminate Ripley to cut the field down to four (Rodriguez, Morgan, Sol Ruca, and Tiffany Stratton), Rodriguez was standing on the middle rope taunting Ripley, in which Morgan proceeded to eliminate Rodriguez from the match. On the February 23 episode of Raw, Morgan declared that she will challenge Stephanie Vaquer for the Women's World Championship at WrestleMania 42. On that same night, Rodriguez defeated Iyo Sky and Kairi Sane in a triple-threat match to qualify for the women's Elimination Chamber match. At the event, Rodriguez entered the Chamber at number 6, and eliminated Asuka and Kiana James before eventually being eliminated from the match by Stratton, placing third. At WrestleMania 42 Night 1 on April 18, Morgan defeated Vaquer to win the Women's World Championship for a third time.

Morgan subsequently entered the Queen of the Ring tournament with the goal of becoming a double world champion. At Night of Champions on June 27, Morgan lost to Iyo Sky in the tournament final. On the June 29 episode of Raw, Rodriguez defeated Maxxine Dupri in a match to determine the contendership for Sol Ruca's Women's Intercontinental Championship. The following week, she was unsuccessful in winning the title, but in a rematch on the July 27 episode, Rodriguez defeated Ruca to win the title, claiming her first singles title on the main roster. On the next episode, Rodriguez introduced her own custom championship belt with the standard belt wrapped in barbed wire. At SummerSlam Night 1 on At the event on August 1, Morgan successfully retained the title in her first defense against Sky. At a live event in Santiago, Chile on September 12, Morgan lost the Women's World Championship back to Vaquer after interference from guest referee Becky Lynch, ending her reign at 147 days. The feud between the three eventually led to a triple threat match on October 10, at Money in the Bank, where Morgan regained the title.

== Championships and accomplishments ==
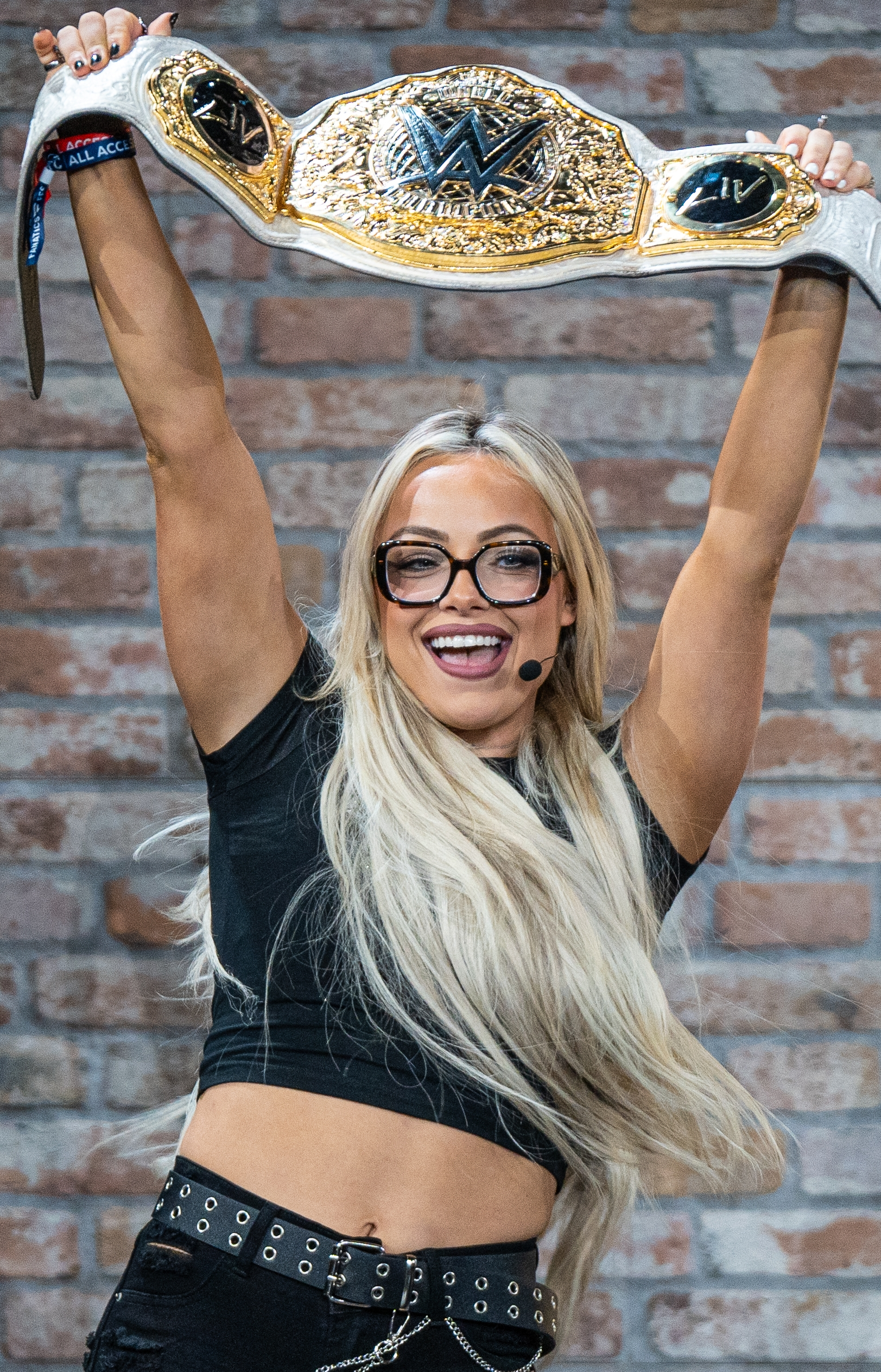
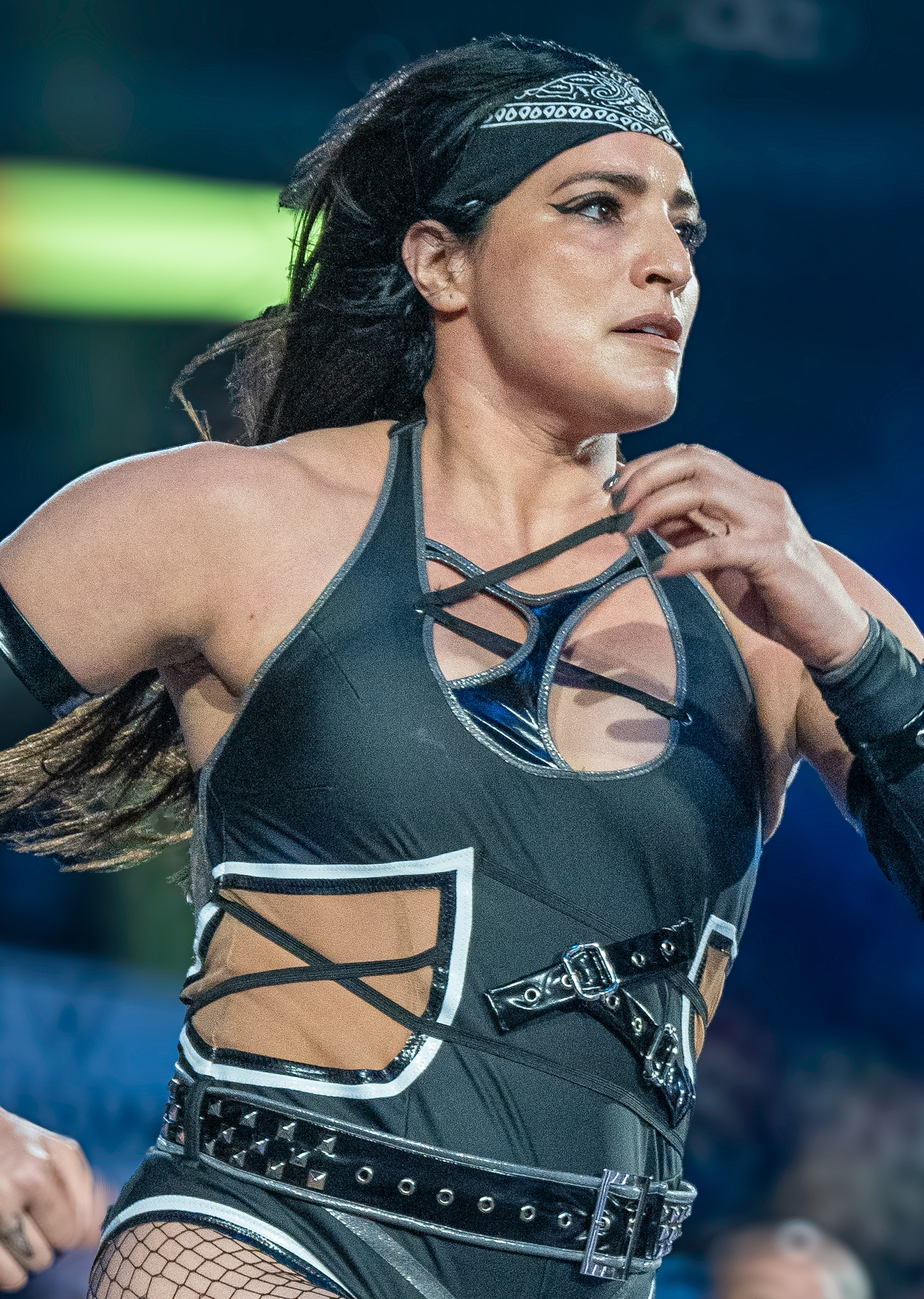
Liv Morgan is a four-time Women's World Champion. Morgan and Raquel Rodriguez are also four-time WWE Women's Tag Team Champions as a tag team.
- Fightful
  - Women’s Tag Team of the Year (2025)
- New York Post
  - Faction of the Year (2024) as part of The Judgment Day
  - Best OMG Moment (2024) Liv Morgan kisses Dominik Mysterio at SummerSlam
- Pro Wrestling Illustrated
  - Ranked No. 24 of the top 100 Tag Teams in the PWI Tag Team 100 in 2023
  - Ranked Morgan No. 12 of the top 250 female wrestlers in the PWI Women's 250 in 2024
- SiriusXM Busted Open Radio
  - Female Wrestler of the Year (2024) – Morgan
- Uncrowned
  - Ranked Morgan No. 1 of the top female wrestlers Uncrowned Pound For Pound Pro Wrestling in 2024
- WWE
  - Women's World Championship (3 times, current) – Morgan
  - WWE Women's Intercontinental Championship (1 time) - Rodriguez
  - WWE Women's Crown Jewel Championship (1 time, inaugural) – Morgan
  - Women's Royal Rumble (2026) – Morgan
  - WWE Women's Tag Team Championship (4 times)
  - Slammy Award (2 times)
    - Female Superstar of the Year (2025) – Morgan
    - Villain of the Year (2025) – Morgan with Dominik Mysterio
