= List of WWE Women's Tag Team Champions =

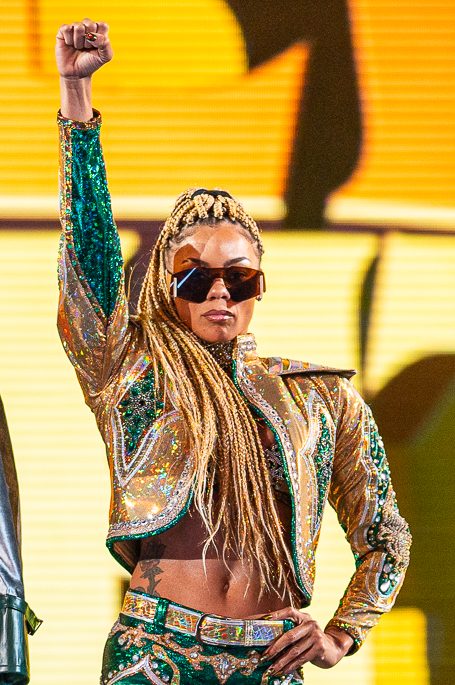
Current champions Michin and B-Fab

The WWE Women's Tag Team Championship is a women's professional wrestling world tag team championship created and promoted by the American promotion WWE. Announced on December 24, 2018, it is the only women's tag team championship in WWE, thus is available to both main roster brands, Raw and SmackDown. The championship was originally created to be available to all two brands, but it ceased appearing on NXT after the establishment of the NXT Women's Tag Team Championship in 2021. In June 2023, the WWE Women's Tag Team Championship became available to NXT again after the NXT Women's Tag Team Championship was unified into the WWE Women's Tag Team Championship.

The championship is generally contested in professional wrestling matches, in which participants execute scripted finishes rather than contend in direct competition. The inaugural championship team was Bayley and Sasha Banks from Raw, who at the time went by the team name of The Boss 'n' Hug Connection and won the title in a tag team Elimination Chamber match at the 2019 Elimination Chamber event. Michin and B-Fab from SmackDown are the current champions in their first reign, both as a team and individually. They won the title by defeating Alexa Bliss and Tatum Paxley on the October 23, 2026, episode of SmackDown in Ontario, California.

As of November 21, 2026, there have been 39 reigns between 29 teams composed of 44 individual champions and two vacancies. As a team, Liv Morgan and Raquel Rodriguez have the most reigns at four, while individually, Rodriguez has the most reigns at six. As a team, The Kabuki Warriors's (Asuka and Kairi Sane) first reign is the longest reign at 171–172 days (180 days as recognized by WWE due to tape delay), while the team of Becky Lynch and Lyra Valkyria have the shortest reign at 1 day (less than a day as recognized by WWE). As a team, The Kabuki Warriors have the longest combined reign at 270–271 days, while individually, Asuka has the longest combined reign at 317–318 days. Lita is the oldest champion, winning the title at 47 years old, while Roxanne Perez is the youngest, winning it at 23.

== Title history ==
Key
No.	Overall reign number
Reign	Reign number for the specific team—reign numbers for the individuals are in parentheses, if different
Days	Number of days held
Days recog.	Number of days held recognized by the promotion
<1	Reign lasted less than a day
+	Current reign is changing daily

No.	Champion	Championship change			Reign statistics			Notes	Ref.
No.	Champion	Date	Event	Location	Reign	Days	Days recog.	Notes	Ref.
WWE: Raw, SmackDown, and NXT
1	The Boss 'n' Hug Connection (Bayley and Sasha Banks)	February 17, 2019	Elimination Chamber	Houston, TX	1	49	49	This was a tag team Elimination Chamber match to determine the inaugural champions, also involving the teams of Nia Jax and Tamina, The Riott Squad (Liv Morgan and Sarah Logan), Mandy Rose and Sonya Deville, The IIconics (Billie Kay and Peyton Royce), and Carmella and Naomi. The Boss 'n' Hug Connection lastly eliminated Rose and Deville to become the inaugural champions.	
2	The IIconics (Billie Kay and Peyton Royce)	April 7, 2019	WrestleMania 35	East Rutherford, NJ	1	120	120	This was a fatal four-way tag team match, also involving the teams of Nia Jax and Tamina and the Divas of Doom (Beth Phoenix and Natalya).	
3	Alexa Bliss and Nikki Cross	August 5, 2019	Raw	Pittsburgh, PA	1	62	61	This was a fatal four-way tag team elimination match, also involving the teams of Mandy Rose and Sonya Deville and The Kabuki Warriors (Asuka and Kairi Sane). Bliss lastly pinned Sane to win the title.	
4	The Kabuki Warriors (Asuka and Kairi Sane)	October 6, 2019	Hell in a Cell	Sacramento, CA	1	171–172	180	WWE recognizes this reign as ending on April 4, 2020, when the following match aired on tape delay.	
5	Alexa Bliss and Nikki Cross	March 25–26, 2020	WrestleMania 36; Part 1	Orlando, FL	2	62–61	62	WrestleMania was taped on March 25 and 26, but it is unknown which day this match was taped. WWE recognizes this reign as beginning on April 4, 2020, and ending on June 5, 2020, when the matches aired on tape delay.	
6	Bayley and Sasha Banks	May 26, 2020	SmackDown	Orlando, FL	2	96	85	Previously known as The Boss 'n' Hug Connection. WWE recognizes this reign as beginning on June 5, 2020, when the match aired on tape delay.	
7	Nia Jax and Shayna Baszler	August 30, 2020	Payback	Orlando, FL	1	112	112		
8	Asuka and Charlotte Flair	December 20, 2020	TLC: Tables, Ladders & Chairs	St. Petersburg, FL	1 (2, 1)	42	41		
9	Nia Jax and Shayna Baszler	January 31, 2021	Royal Rumble; Kickoff	St. Petersburg, FL	2	103	103	With the establishment of the NXT Women's Tag Team Championship on March 10, 2021, the WWE Women's Tag Team Championship became no longer available to NXT.	
WWE: Raw and SmackDown
10	Natalya and Tamina	May 14, 2021	SmackDown	Tampa, FL	1	129	129		
11	Nikki A.S.H. and Rhea Ripley	September 20, 2021	Raw	Raleigh, NC	1 (3, 1)	63	63	Nikki A.S.H. was previously known as Nikki Cross.	
12	Carmella and Queen Zelina	November 22, 2021	Raw	Brooklyn, NY	1	132	131		
13	Naomi and Sasha Banks	April 3, 2022	WrestleMania 38; Night 2	Arlington, TX	1 (3, 1)	47	46	This was a fatal four-way tag team match, also involving the teams of Liv Morgan and Rhea Ripley, and Natalya and Shayna Baszler.	
—	Vacated	May 20, 2022	SmackDown	Grand Rapids, MI	—	—	—	The title was vacated after Naomi and Sasha Banks legitimately walked out of a scheduled appearance on the May 16, 2022, episode of Raw due to claims of mistreatment of the titles and the division as a whole, which led to the duo being suspended indefinitely (they both later left the company).	
14	Aliyah and Raquel Rodriguez	August 29, 2022	Raw	Pittsburgh, PA	1	14	13	Defeated Dakota Kai and Iyo Sky in the finals of an eight-team tournament to win the vacant championship.	
15	Damage CTRL (Dakota Kai and Iyo Sky)	September 12, 2022	Raw	Portland, OR	1	49	48		
16	Alexa Bliss and Asuka	October 31, 2022	Raw	Dallas, TX	1 (3, 3)	5	4		
17	Damage CTRL (Dakota Kai and Iyo Sky)	November 5, 2022	Crown Jewel	Riyadh, Saudi Arabia	2	114	114		
18	Becky Lynch and Lita	February 27, 2023	Raw	Grand Rapids, MI	1	42	41	For the title defense on the April 10, 2023 episode of Raw, Trish Stratus replaced an injured Lita, but was not recognized as champion.	
19	Liv Morgan and Raquel Rodriguez	April 10, 2023	Raw	Seattle, WA	1 (1, 2)	39	39	Trish Stratus filled in for Lita, who suffered a kayfabe injury prior to the match; Stratus also took the pin.	
—	Vacated	May 19, 2023	SmackDown	Columbia, SC	—	—	—	Liv Morgan and Raquel Rodriguez were forced to relinquish the title after Morgan suffered a legitimate shoulder injury.	
20	Ronda Rousey and Shayna Baszler	May 29, 2023	Raw	Albany, NY	1 (1, 3)	33	32	Defeated the teams of Raquel Rodriguez and Shotzi, Damage CTRL (Bayley and Iyo Sky), and Chelsea Green and Sonya Deville in a fatal four-way tag team match for the vacant title. On the June 23, 2023 episode of SmackDown, Rousey and Baszler defeated Alba Fyre and Isla Dawn to unify the NXT Women's Tag Team Championship into the WWE Women's Tag Team Championship, making the title available to NXT again.	
WWE: Raw, SmackDown, and NXT
21	Liv Morgan and Raquel Rodriguez	July 1, 2023	Money in the Bank	London, England	2 (2, 3)	16	16		
22	Chelsea Green and Sonya Deville/Piper Niven	July 17, 2023	Raw	Atlanta, GA	1	154 (28/126)	154	Green originally won the title with Deville, however, Deville later suffered a torn ACL and was forced to relinquish her share of the title. On the August 14, 2023 episode of Raw, Niven declared herself as Green's new championship partner; WWE recognizes this as a single uninterrupted reign.	
23	Katana Chance and Kayden Carter	December 18, 2023	Raw	Des Moines, IA	1	39	38		
24	The Kabuki Warriors (Asuka and Kairi Sane)	January 26, 2024	SmackDown	Miami, FL	2 (4, 2)	99	98		
25	Bianca Belair and Jade Cargill	May 4, 2024	Backlash	Décines-Charpieu, France	1	42	42		
26	The Unholy Union (Alba Fyre and Isla Dawn)	June 15, 2024	Clash at the Castle	Glasgow, Scotland	1	77	76	This was a triple threat tag team match, also involving the team of Shayna Baszler and Zoey Stark, who Fyre and Dawn pinned.	
27	Bianca Belair and Jade Cargill/Naomi	August 31, 2024	Bash in Berlin	Berlin, Germany	2 (2, 2/2)	177 (104/73)	177	Belair originally won the championship with Cargill. 104 days later Belair chose Naomi as a new partner but after Cargill suffered an injury on the December 20, 2024, episode of SmackDown (taped December 13); WWE recognizes this as a single uninterrupted reign.	
28	Liv Morgan and Raquel Rodriguez	February 24, 2025	Raw	Cincinnati, OH	3 (3, 4)	55	54		
29	Becky Lynch and Lyra Valkyria	April 20, 2025	WrestleMania 41; Night 2	Paradise, NV	1 (2, 1)	1	<1		
30	Liv Morgan and Raquel Rodriguez	April 21, 2025	Raw	Paradise, NV	4 (4, 5)	70	69		
31	The Judgment Day (Raquel Rodriguez and Roxanne Perez)	June 30, 2025	Raw	Pittsburgh, PA	1 (6, 1)	33	32	Due to a legitimate injury incurred by Rodriguez's previous partner Liv Morgan, Perez was chosen as Rodriguez's new partner; WWE recognizes this as a separate reign.	
32	Alexa Bliss and Charlotte Flair	August 2, 2025	SummerSlam; Night 1	East Rutherford, NJ	1 (4, 2)	100	100		
33	The Kabuki Warriors (Asuka and Kairi Sane)	November 10, 2025	Raw	Boston, MA	3 (5, 3)	56	55		
34	Rhiyo (Rhea Ripley and Iyo Sky)	January 5, 2026	Raw on Netflix Anniversary Show	Brooklyn, NY	1 (2, 3)	53	53	They originally won the title by simply the names of Rhea Ripley and Iyo Sky.	
35	The Irresistible Forces (Nia Jax and Lash Legend)	February 27, 2026	SmackDown	Louisville, KY	1 (3, 1)	50	49		
36	Brie Bella and Paige	April 18, 2026	WrestleMania 42; Night 1	Paradise, NV	1	91	91	This was a fatal four-way tag team match that also involved the team of Bayley and Lyra Valkyria and the team of Charlotte Flair and Alexa Bliss, with Paige pinning Bliss. Brie was originally scheduled to team with her sister Nikki Bella as The Bella Twins but just before the match, Nikki was replaced by Paige due to injury.	
37	Fatal Influence (Fallon Henley and Lainey Reid)	July 18, 2026	Saturday Night's Main Event XLV	New York, NY	1	83	83		
38	Alexa Bliss and Tatum Paxley	October 9, 2026	SmackDown	Lafayette, LA	1 (5, 1)	14	13	Alexa Bliss filled in for Charlotte Flair, who suffered a kayfabe injury prior to the match.	
39	Michin and B-Fab	October 23, 2026	SmackDown	Ontario, CA	1	29+	29+		

== Combined reigns ==
As of November 21, 2026.

†	Indicates the current champion
¤	The exact length of at least one title reign is uncertain; the combined length may not be correct
<1	Reign lasted less than a day

=== By team ===
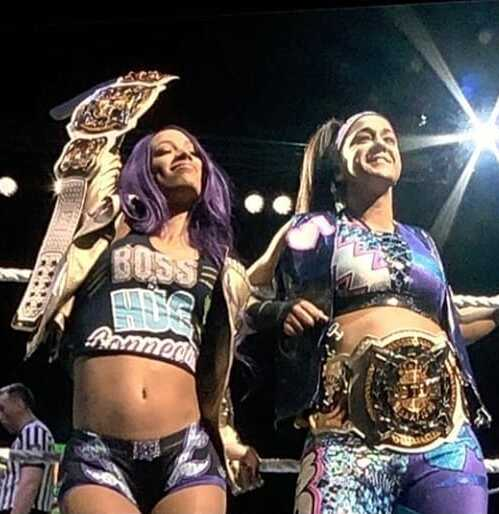
Inaugural and two-time champions Sasha Banks and Bayley; during their inaugural reign, they were known as The Boss 'n' Hug Connection, while during their second reign, they were known simply as Bayley and Sasha Banks.

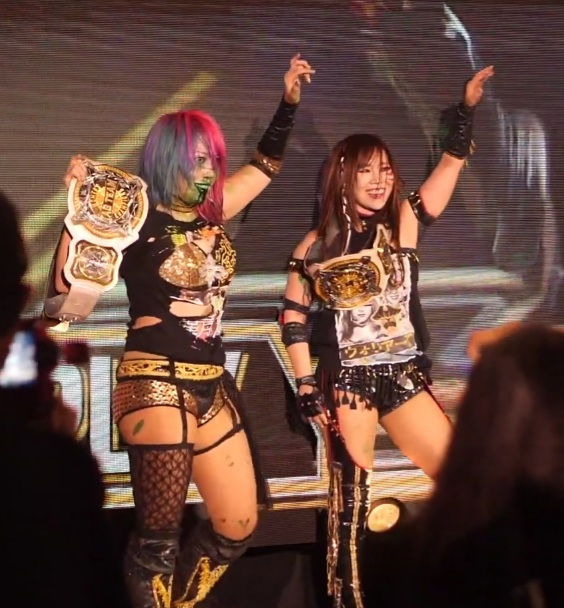
As a team, The Kabuki Warriors (Asuka and Kairi Sane) have both the longest single and combined reign at 171–172 days and 270–271 days, respectively (the date they originally lost the title is unknown, but WWE recognizes 180 days due to tape delay, which is still the longest; they also recognize their combined reign as lasting 278 days, also due to tape delay).

Rank	Team	No. of reigns	Combined days	Combined days rec. by WWE
1	The Kabuki Warriors (Asuka and Kairi Sane)	3	¤326	334
2	Bianca Belair and Jade Cargill/Naomi	2 (Note: Bianca Belair originally began her second reign with Jade Cargill, however, after Cargill suffered an injury (kayfabe), Belair was allowed to choose Naomi as her new championship partner.)	219	
3	Nia Jax and Shayna Baszler	2	215	
4	Liv Morgan and Raquel Rodriguez	4 (Note: The team represented The Judgment Day during their third and fourth reigns.)	180	178
5	Damage CTRL (Dakota Kai and Iyo Sky)	2	163	162
6	Chelsea Green and Sonya Deville/Piper Niven	1 (Note: Chelsea Green originally won the championship with Sonya Deville, but after Deville suffered a torn ACL and was forced to relinquish her share of the title, Piper Niven declared herself as Green's new championship partner.)	154	
7	Bayley and Sasha Banks	2 (Note: The team was known as The Boss 'n' Hug Connection during their first reign.)	145	134
8	Carmella and Queen Zelina	1	132	131
9	Natalya and Tamina	1	129	
10	Alexa Bliss and Nikki Cross	2	¤123	123
11	The IIconics (Billie Kay and Peyton Royce)	1	120	
12	Alexa Bliss and Charlotte Flair	1	100	
13	Brie Bella and Paige	1	91	
14	Fatal Influence (Fallon Henley and Lainey Reid)	1	83	
15	The Unholy Union (Alba Fyre and Isla Dawn)	1	77	76
16	Nikki A.S.H. and Rhea Ripley	1	63	
17	Rhiyo (Rhea Ripley and Iyo Sky)	1	53	
18	The Irresistible Forces (Nia Jax and Lash Legend)	1	50	
19	Naomi and Sasha Banks	1	47	46
20	Asuka and Charlotte Flair	1	42	41
20	Becky Lynch and Lita	1	42	41
22	Katana Chance and Kayden Carter	1	39	38
23	Raquel Rodriguez and Roxanne Perez	1 (Note: The team represented The Judgment Day during this reign.)	33	32
23	Ronda Rousey and Shayna Baszler	1	33	32
25	Michin and B-Fab †	1	29+	
26	Alexa Bliss and Tatum Paxley	1	14	
27	Aliyah and Raquel Rodriguez	1	14	13
28	Alexa Bliss and Asuka	1	5	4
29	Becky Lynch and Lyra Valkyria	1	1	<1

=== By wrestler ===
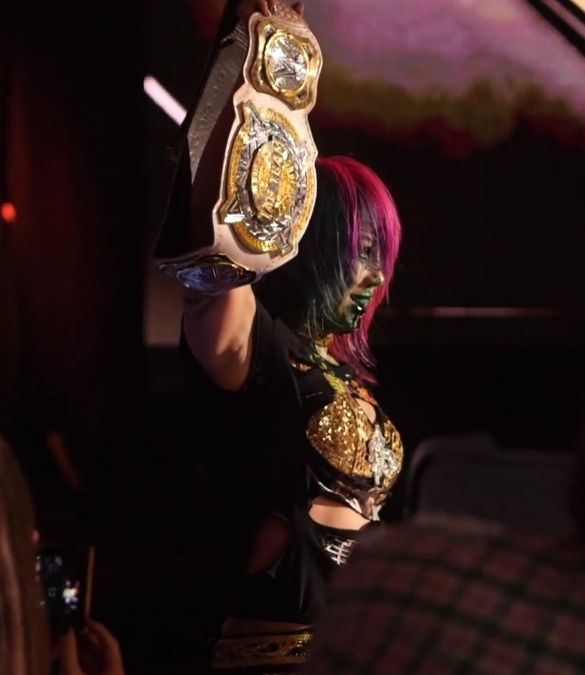
Individually, Asuka holds the record for the longest cumulative time as champion at 373–374 days (379 days as recognized by WWE).

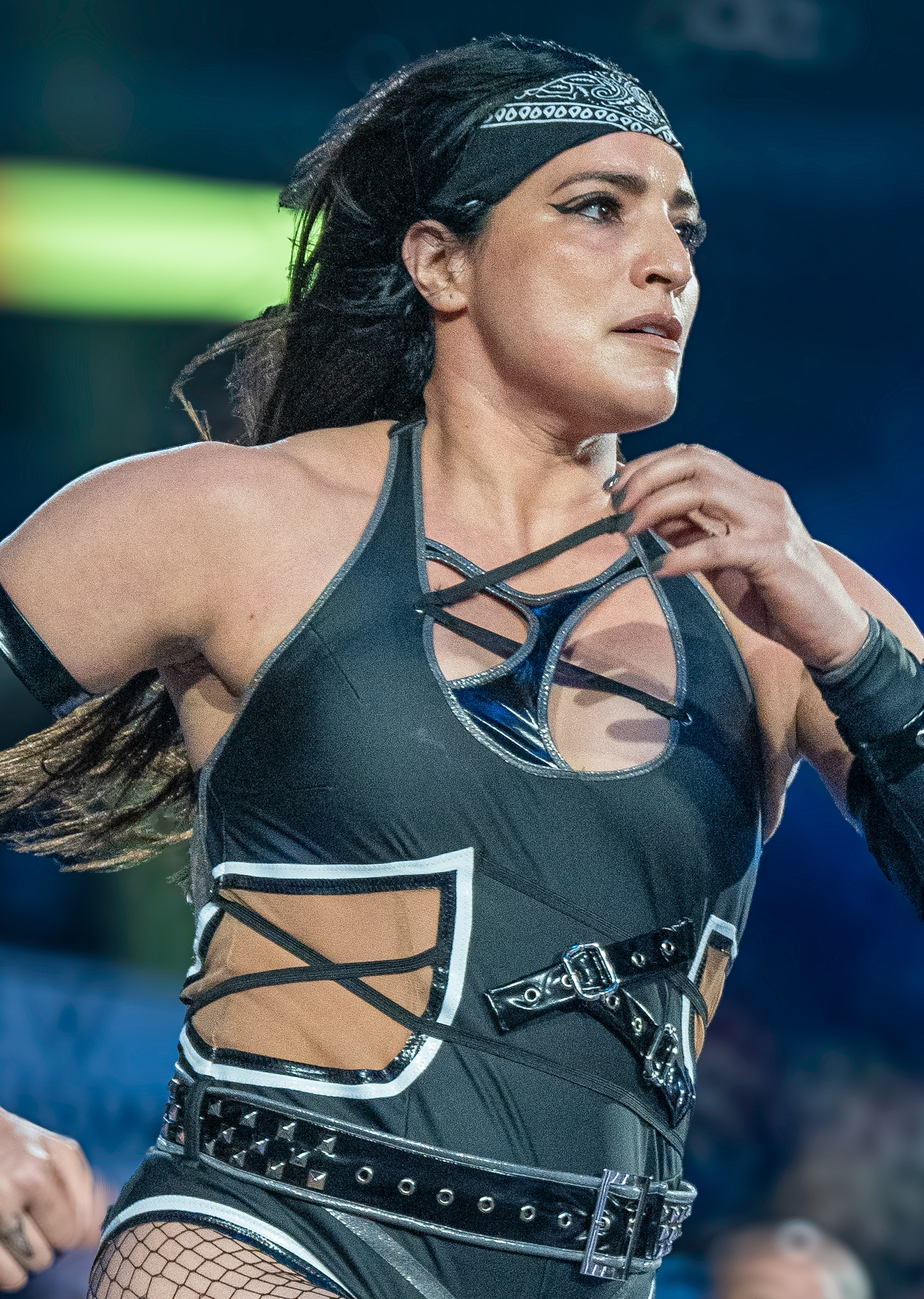
Record six-time champion Raquel Rodriguez.

Rank	Wrestler	No. of reigns	Combined days	Combined days rec. by WWE
1	Asuka	5	¤373	379
2	Kairi Sane	3	¤326	334
3	Nia Jax	3	265	
4	Shayna Baszler	3	248	247
5	Alexa Bliss	5	¤242	241
6	Raquel Rodriguez	6	227	223
7	Bianca Belair	2	219	
8	Iyo Sky	3	216	215
9	Sasha Banks	3	192	180
10	Nikki Cross	3 (Note: She was known as Nikki A.S.H. during her third reign with Rhea Ripley.)	¤186	186
11	Liv Morgan	4	180	178
12	Dakota Kai	2	163	162
13	Chelsea Green	1	154	
14	Jade Cargill	2	146	153
15	Bayley	2	145	134
16	Charlotte Flair	2	142	141
17	Carmella	1	132	131
17	Queen Zelina	1	132	131
19	Natalya	1	129	
19	Tamina	1	129	
21	Piper Niven	1	126	
22	Billie Kay	1	120	
22	Peyton Royce	1	120	
22	Naomi	2	120	112
25	Rhea Ripley	2	116	
26	Brie Bella	1	91	
26	Paige	1	91	
28	Fallon Henley	1	83	
28	Lainey Reid	1	83	
30	Alba Fyre	1	77	76
30	Isla Dawn	1	77	76
32	Lash Legend	1	50	
33	Becky Lynch	2	43	41
34	Lita	1	42	41
35	Katana Chance	1	39	38
35	Kayden Carter	1	39	38
37	Roxanne Perez	1	33	32
37	Ronda Rousey	1	33	32
39	B-Fab †	1	29+	
39	Michin †	1	29+	
41	Sonya Deville	1	28	
42	Aliyah	1	14	13
42	Tatum Paxley	1	14	
44	Lyra Valkyria	1	1	<1
