= Raquel Rodriguez (wrestler) =

American professional wrestler (born 1991)

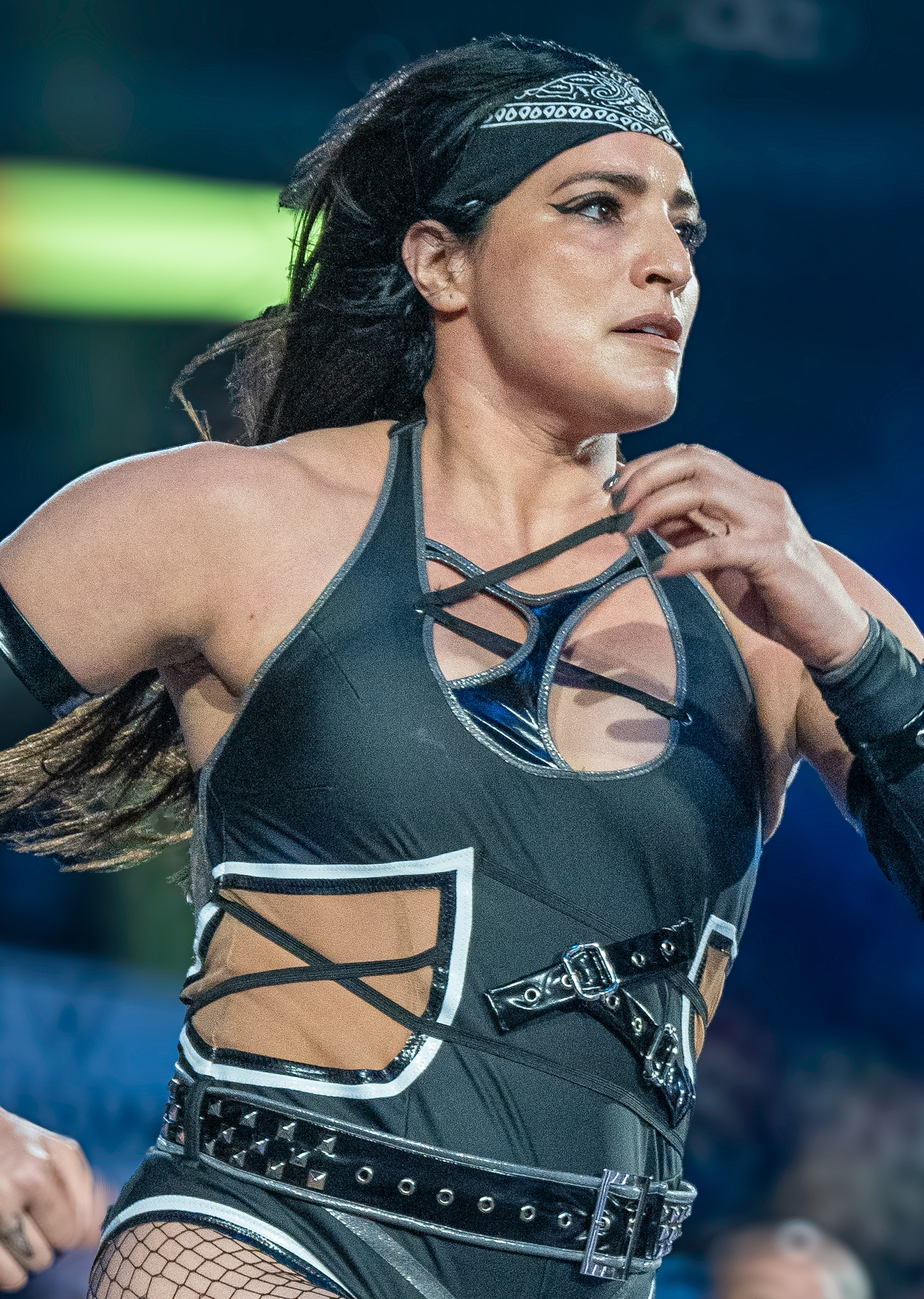
- Rodriguez in 2025

Personal information
- Born: Victoria González; January 12, 1991 (age 35) La Feria, Texas, U.S.

Professional wrestling career
- Ring name(s): Raquel González; Raquel Rodriguez; Reina González; Victoria González
- Billed height: 6 ft 0 in (1.83 m)
- Billed weight: 175 lb (79 kg)
- Billed from: Rio Grande Valley, Texas
- Trained by: George de la Isla; Richard Aleman; WWE Performance Center
- Debut: 2013

Victoria González (born January 12, 1991) is an American professional wrestler. She has been signed to WWE since October 2016, where she performs on the Raw brand under the ring name Raquel Rodriguez and is a member of The Judgment Day stable.

González is a second generation professional wrestler, following her father Rick González. After training at Americas Academy of Pro Wrestling under George de la Isla in 2013, she competed on the independent circuit. In October 2016, she signed with WWE, performing under her real name, and debuted for the company's developmental brand, NXT, in early 2017. Her ring name was changed to Reina González later that year, before it again changed to Raquel González in early 2020. In early 2021, she and Dakota Kai won the inaugural Women's Dusty Rhodes Tag Team Classic, then becoming the inaugural NXT Women's Tag Team Champions, a title they won again in early 2022 for a record-tying second time. (Note: She and Dakota Kai are tied with Toxic Attraction (Gigi Dolin and Jacy Jayne) for the most reigns as a team and individually.) She also won the NXT Women's Championship once. She moved to the main roster on the SmackDown brand in April 2022, with her ring name changed to Raquel Rodriguez, and then moved to Raw the next year. While on the main roster, she won the WWE Women's Tag Team Championship once with Aliyah, four times with Liv Morgan, and once with Roxanne Perez, giving her a record-setting six reigns with the title as an individual. She also holds the record for most title reigns as a tag team alongside Morgan. In July 2026, Rodriguez won the Women's Intercontinental Championship

== Early life and basketball career ==
Victoria González was born on January 12, 1991, in La Feria, Texas, and grew up in Lower Rio Grande Valley. She is of Mexican descent, with her family originating from the Monterrey area. She graduated from Hidalgo High School as part of the class of 2009. In her time at Hidalgo, she finished her basketball career with 2,470 points and 2,018 rebounds. As a senior, she averaged 22.2 points and 12.3 rebounds. She was named District 32-3A MVP, and The Monitor's All Valley MVP. She was also a National Honor Society member. A fan of professional wrestling growing up, she cites Madusa, Lita, and her father Rick, who wrestled as Desperado, as her inspirations. González played college basketball for Texas A&M Kingsville for two years, leading the team in shooting percentage and blocked shots. She transferred to Sam Houston in 2012, where she continued her collegiate basketball career, averaging 1 point per game, 1.3 rebounds per game, and 0.3 assists in 16 games played before she was cut from the team at the end of the year. She transferred once again in her senior year, this time to Texas A&M.

== Professional wrestling career ==
=== Early career (2013–2016) ===
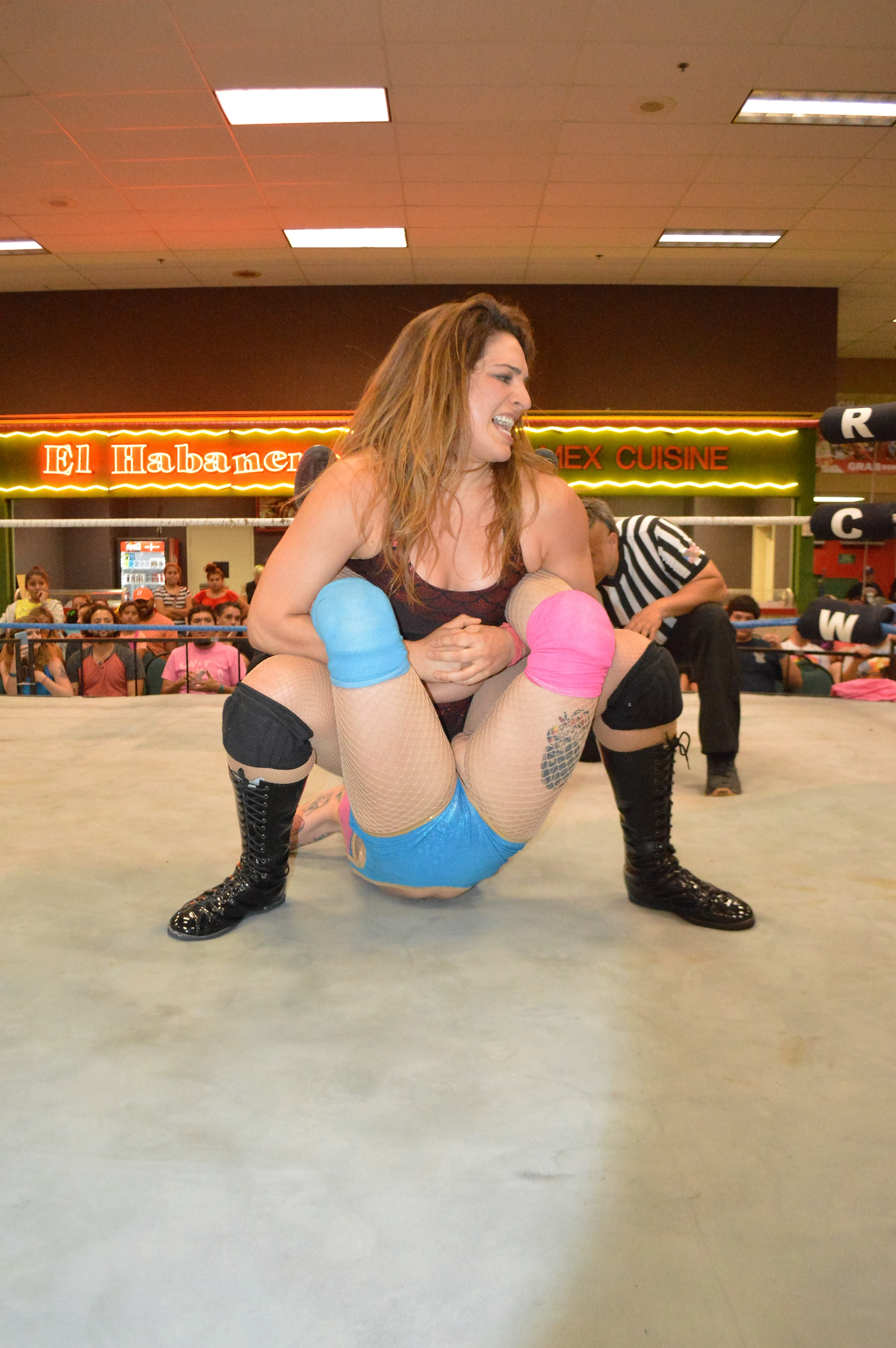
González performing a Boston Crab on Delilah Doom in 2016.

Following her graduation in 2013, González moved to Austin to train for a professional wrestling career under George de la Isla at Americas Academy of Pro Wrestling. She spent the next few years wrestling on the independent circuit, and due to her size, she was often paired against smaller opponents. Her last independent circuit match was on June 3, 2016, in a tag team match at a River City Wrestling (RCW) event, where she teamed with Claudia del Solis in a losing effort against Baby D and Delilah Doom.

=== WWE ===
==== Early appearances (2016–2020) ====
On October 25, 2016, González signed a contract with WWE, where she reported to the WWE Performance Center. She made her in-ring debut at an NXT live event on January 20, 2017, under her birth name, where she was unsuccessful in winning a 12-woman battle royal. On the May 3 episode of NXT, González made her televised debut, where she was eliminated in a battle royal to determine the number one contender for the NXT Women's Championship. Under the ring name Reina González, she competed in the inaugural Mae Young Classic tournament, where she was eliminated in the first round by Nicole Savoy, which aired on August 28. In September 2018, González competed in the following year's tournament, but was eliminated in the first round by Kacy Catanzaro.

==== Alliance with Dakota Kai (2020–2021) ====
On February 16, 2020, at NXT TakeOver: Portland, under the ring name Raquel González, she interfered in a street fight between Dakota Kai and Tegan Nox, slamming Nox through a table, allowing Kai to win the match, thus establishing herself as a heel. González became the bodyguard of Kai, helping Kai win her matches. In her first pay-per-view match at TakeOver: In Your House on June 7, González, Kai, and Candice LeRae lost to Mia Yim, Nox and Shotzi Blackheart in a six-woman tag team match. At NXT TakeOver XXX on August 22, González attacked NXT Women's Champion Io Shirai following her title match with Kai, before being confronted by Rhea Ripley, beginning a rivalry between the two. González lost to Ripley on October 28 at Halloween Havoc. At NXT TakeOver: WarGames on December 6, González participated in her first WarGames match, where she and Kai teamed with LeRae and Toni Storm to defeat Blackheart, Ember Moon, Shirai, and Ripley, after González pinned Shirai. At New Year's Evil on January 6, 2021, she defeated Ripley in a Last Woman Standing match, ending their feud.

Kai and González took part in the inaugural Women's Dusty Rhodes Tag Team Classic, defeating Blackheart and Moon in the finals at Vengeance Day on February 14, to win the tournament. With this win, they received a WWE Women's Tag Team Championship match against champions Nia Jax and Shayna Baszler on March 3; the match ended in controversy, with Jax and Baszler retaining after Baszler submitted Kai, despite Kai not being the legal competitor. The following week, González and Kai were awarded the newly created NXT Women's Tag Team Championship, the first title in González's career. However, later that night, they lost the titles to Blackheart and Moon in their first title defense.

==== NXT Women's Champion (2021–2022) ====
At Night 1 of NXT TakeOver: Stand & Deliver on April 7, González defeated Shirai to win the NXT Women's Championship. On the May 11 episode of NXT, she made her first successful title defense against Mercedes Martinez. At NXT TakeOver: In Your House on June 13, González defeated Moon to retain the title. On the July 27 episode of NXT, González was attacked by Kai, turning face and ending their alliance. At NXT TakeOver 36 on August 22, González successfully defended the title against Kai, and was confronted by Kay Lee Ray after the match.

On the September 28 episode of NXT, after retaining the title against Franky Monet, González was attacked by Toxic Attraction (Mandy Rose, Gigi Dolin, and Jacy Jayne). A Spin the Wheel, Make the Deal match between González and Rose for the title was scheduled for Halloween Havoc on October 26, where González lost the NXT Women's Championship to Rose in a Trick or Street Fight, due to the returning Kai's interference, ending her reign at 202 days. On December 5 at NXT WarGames, González, Cora Jade, Kay Lee Ray and Shirai defeated Kai and Toxic Attraction in a WarGames match. At New Year's Evil on January 4, 2022, González failed to regain the title in a triple threat match also involving Jade, who Rose pinned to retain the title. González and Jade took part in the Women's Dusty Rhodes Tag Team Classic, but lost to Kai and Wendy Choo in the semi-finals on March 8 at Roadblock. On the March 29 episode of NXT, González assisted Kai in attacking Toxic Attraction, with the two embracing afterwards. At the NXT Stand & Deliver pre-show on April 2, González and Kai defeated Dolin and Jayne to win the NXT Women's Tag Team Championship. They lost the titles in a rematch on the following episode of NXT, after interference from Rose; this was González's final appearance in NXT.

==== WWE Women's Tag Team Champion (2022–2023) ====
González made her main roster debut on the April 8 episode of SmackDown, in a backstage segment under the new ring name Raquel Rodriguez. On April 29, she made her in-ring debut for the brand, defeating a local competitor. On the May 13 episode of SmackDown, Rodriguez answered Ronda Rousey's open challenge for the SmackDown Women's Championship, but lost. She unsuccessfully competed in the Money in the Bank ladder match at the namesake event on July 2.

On the August 29 episode of Raw, Rodriguez and Aliyah defeated Damage CTRL (Dakota Kai and Iyo Sky) in a tournament final to win the WWE Women's Tag Team Championship, making Rodriguez the first woman to have held the NXT Women's and WWE Women's Tag Team Championships. However, they lost the titles back to Kai and Sky on the September 12 episode of Raw, ending their reign at 14 days. On the December 23 episode of SmackDown, Rodriguez won a gauntlet match to become the number one contender to the SmackDown Women's Championship, but failed to win the title from Rousey the following week, after interference from Shayna Baszler.

Rodriguez entered her first Royal Rumble match at the titular event on January 28, 2023, eliminating Nia Jax, Lacey Evans, and Piper Niven, before being eliminated by eventual winner Rhea Ripley. At Elimination Chamber on February 18, she competed inside the namesake structure for a Raw Women's Championship match at WrestleMania 39, eliminating Nikki Cross, before being eliminated by Asuka and Carmella. On Night 2 of WrestleMania 39 on April 2, Rodriguez teamed with Liv Morgan in the women's WrestleMania Showcase fatal four-way tag team match, which was won by Rousey and Baszler. On the April 10 episode of Raw, Rodriguez and Morgan defeated Becky Lynch and Trish Stratus to win the WWE Women's Tag Team Championship.

As part of the 2023 WWE Draft, Rodriguez was drafted to the Raw brand. On the May 19 episode of SmackDown, Rodriguez and Morgan vacated the WWE Women's Tag Team Championship, due to Morgan suffering an injury during their title defense against Kai and Bayley the previous week, ending their first reign at 39 days. She failed to win the vacant titles with her new tag team partner, Shotzi, on the May 29 episode of Raw, which were won by Rousey and Baszler. When Morgan returned from injury, she and Rodriguez regained the titles from Rousey and Baszler at Money in the Bank on July 1, after Baszler turned on Rousey. On the July 17 episode of Raw, Rodriguez and Morgan were scheduled to defend their titles against Sonya Deville and Chelsea Green, however, Ripley attacked Rodriguez and Morgan before the match, causing Rodriguez to sustain a left knee injury. Later that night, Rodriguez and Morgan lost the titles to Deville and Green, ending their second reign at 16 days. Rodriguez unsuccessfully challenged Ripley for the Women's World Championship at Payback on September 2, on the September 11 episode of Raw, and in a fatal five-way match at Crown Jewel on November 4.

==== The Judgment Day (2024–present) ====
In January 2024, Rodriguez revealed that she was diagnosed with mast cell activation syndrome, resulting in her absence from WWE programming. After a two-month hiatus, she returned on the February 19 episode of Raw, winning a Last Chance battle royal to earn the sixth and final spot in the women's Elimination Chamber match at Elimination Chamber: Perth on February 24, where she was eliminated by Bianca Belair. On March 18, she was pulled from the active roster, after her mast cell activation syndrome flared up at Elimination Chamber: Perth.

After a seven-month hiatus, Rodriguez returned at Bad Blood on October 5, attacking Ripley and helping Morgan retain the Women's World Championship, turning heel for the first time on the main roster and becoming the newest member of The Judgment Day. At Survivor Series WarGames on November 30, Rodriguez, Morgan, Jax, Tiffany Stratton and Candice LeRae lost to Ripley, Belair, Bayley, Iyo Sky and Naomi in a WarGames match. On February 1, 2025, at Royal Rumble, Rodriguez entered the titular match at number 26, but was eliminated by Jax. On the February 24 episode of Raw, Rodriguez and Morgan defeated Belair and Naomi to win the WWE Women's Tag Team Championship for a record-setting third time as a team (and record fourth for Rodriguez individually), after interference from "Dirty" Dominik Mysterio. On the March 24 episode of Raw, Rodriguez unsuccessfully challenged Lyra Valkyria for the WWE Women's Intercontinental Championship. On Night 2 of WrestleMania 41 on April 20, Rodriguez and Morgan lost the titles to Valkyria and the returning Becky Lynch, ending their reign at 55 days, but regained them in a rematch the next night on Raw, marking their record-setting fourth reign as a team and record fifth reign for Rodriguez individually. The following night on NXT, Rodriguez and Morgan successfully defended the titles against Gigi Dolin and Tatum Paxley. At Night of Champions on June 28, Rodriguez lost to Ripley in a Street Fight.

On the June 30 episode of Raw, due to a legitimate injury incurred by Morgan in mid-June, Roxanne Perez, who had been inserting herself into The Judgment Day, joined the group and officially replaced Morgan as Rodriguez's new tag partner. WWE considers this a separate reign for Rodriguez, ending her reign with Morgan at 70 days, and beginning a new reign with Perez, marking Rodriguez's record sixth reign with the title individually. At Evolution on July 13, Rodriguez and Perez successfully defended the titles against The Kabuki Warriors (Asuka and Kairi Sane), Charlotte Flair and Alexa Bliss and Sol Ruca and Zaria in a fatal four-way tag team match. On Night 1 of SummerSlam on August 2, Rodriguez and Perez lost the titles to Flair and Bliss, ending their reign at 33 days. They failed to regain the titles two nights later on Raw.

On the December 15 episode of Raw, Rodriguez faced Stephanie Vaquer for the Women's World Championship, though her efforts were unsuccessful when Nikki Bella, in storyline, interfered which resulted in a no contest. On the outside of the ring, Bella threw Rodriguez head first into the steel steps, which resulted in Rodriguez being cut open on the forehead and suffering a legitimate concussion.

At the 2026 Royal Rumble, Rodriguez would place 4th in the women's match, the highest she has ever finished. She would be eliminated by her Judgement Day factionmate, and eventual winner, Liv Morgan. On the February 2 episode of Raw, Rodriguez would once again challenge Vaquer for the Women's World Championship, this time in a street fight, and prior to the match, an irate Rodriguez would ask Morgan to let her attempt to win the match by herself without help. Despite Rodriguez's request, Morgan would insert herself into the match along with factionmate Roxanne Perez, in which Morgan attempted to hand Rodriguez the title belt to hit Vaquer with, and Rodriguez hesitated, resulting in Vaquer attacking Rodriguez, dispatching of Morgan and later Perez, and once again defeating Rodriguez, further deepening the tensions in the relationship between Rodriguez and Morgan.

On the February 23 episode of Raw in Atlanta, Rodriguez defeated Iyo Sky and Kairi Sane in a triple-threat match to qualify for the women's Elimination Chamber match in Chicago. At the event, Rodriguez entered the Chamber at number 6, and eliminated Asuka and Kiana James before eventually being eliminated from the match by Tiffany Stratton, placing third.

On the May 11 episode of Raw, Rodriguez and Roxanne Perez confronted Women's Tag Champions Brie Bella and Paige, challenging them for their titles on the following Raw in a face-off in the ring before it eventually devolved into a brawl after Liv Morgan attacked Bella from behind, resulting in an ensuing 3-on-2 and the Judgement Day girls standing tall at the end of the segment. Raquel and Roxanne then challenged for the titles the next week, but were unsuccessful.

On the June 29 episode of Raw, Rodriguez defeated Maxxine Dupri in a match to determine the contendership for Sol Ruca's Women's Intercontinental Championship. The following week, she was unsuccessful in winning the title, but in a rematch on the July 27 episode, Rodriguez defeated Ruca to win the title, claiming her first singles title on the main roster. On the next episode, Rodriguez introduced her own custom championship belt with the standard belt wrapped in barbed wire. On the November 16 episode of Raw, Rodriguez lost the title to Sky ending her reign at 112 days.

== Personal life ==
González is fluent in English and Spanish, and has a bachelor's degree from Texas A&M in mass communications. She interned at a news network in College Station in her senior year of college before becoming a professional wrestler.

González is a devout Episcopalian, and is known to regularly lead pre-show prayers for female wrestlers. On January 1, 2024, she revealed that she was diagnosed with mast cell activation syndrome, with alcohol and cologne being two of many known allergens. She is an avid fan of various sports teams, such as the Texans, Spurs, Dynamo, and Tigres. She maintains a close friendship with Liv Morgan outside of wrestling.

During the 2026 NFL Draft, González was selected as one of the celebrities to announce the Texans' draft selections on Day 3. She would announce the selection of Febechi Nwaiwu with the 106th pick in the 4th round.

== Championships and accomplishments ==
- Fightful
  - Women’s Tag Team of the Year (2025) - with The Judgement Day
- New York Post
  - Faction of the Year (2024) as part of The Judgment Day
- Pro Wrestling Illustrated
  - Ranked No. 10 of the top 150 female wrestlers in the PWI Women's 150 in 2021
  - Ranked No. 24 of the top 100 Tag Teams in the PWI Tag Team 100 in 2023 – with Liv Morgan
- WWE
  - WWE Women's Intercontinental Championship (1 time)
  - WWE Women's Tag Team Championship (6 times) – with Aliyah (1), Liv Morgan (4) and Roxanne Perez (1)
  - NXT Women's Championship (1 time)
  - NXT Women's Tag Team Championship (2 times, inaugural) – with Dakota Kai
  - WWE Women's Tag Team Championship Tournament (2022) – with Aliyah
  - Women's Dusty Rhodes Tag Team Classic (2021) – with Dakota Kai
