= The Kabuki Warriors =

Professional wrestling tag team

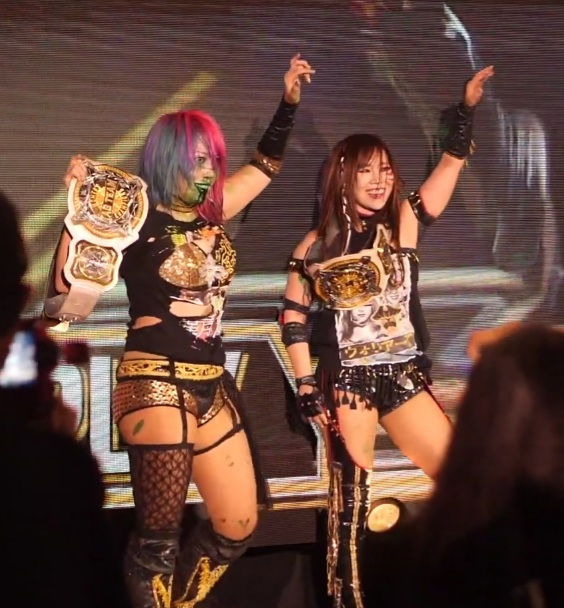
- The Kabuki Warriors (Asuka (left) and Kairi Sane (right)) in 2019.

Tag team
- Members: Asuka; Kairi Sane; Paige (manager)
- Name: The Kabuki Warriors
- Debut: April 16, 2019
- Disbanded: April 24, 2026
- Years active: 2019–2020; 2023–2026

The Kabuki Warriors (カブキウォリアーズ, Kabuki Woriāzu) were a Japanese professional wrestling tag team in WWE, consisting of Asuka and Kairi Sane. They are former three-time WWE Women's Tag Team Champions. As part of the team, Asuka is a former one-time WWE Raw Women's Champion and won the 2020 Women's Money in the Bank.

The team originally formed as faces in April 2019 with Paige as their manager before both of them turned heel and kicked Paige out in October of the same year. Asuka and Sane amicably split up in July 2020 when the latter left WWE to return to Japan. Sane returned to WWE in November 2023 at Crown Jewel and the pair immediately reunited.

== History ==
=== Formation and championship reigns (2019–2020) ===
==== WWE Women's Tag Team Champions (2019–2020) ====
After spending some weeks away to promote the movie Fighting with My Family, retired WWE wrestler Paige made a backstage appearance on the April 9, 2019, episode of SmackDown, where she announced that she would be bringing a new tag team to the SmackDown women's division to feud with The IIconics (Billie Kay and Peyton Royce) for the WWE Women's Tag Team Championship. A week later, Paige introduced the newly formed team of Asuka and Kairi Sane, dubbed "The Kabuki Warriors", who subsequently made their debut as a team by teaming with Bayley and Ember Moon to defeat The IIconics and the team of Mandy Rose and Sonya Deville. Kabuki Warriors would then pick up wins over local wrestlers on the April 30 episode of SmackDown and the team of Rose and Deville on the May 14 SmackDown, before beginning a feud with The IIconics over the WWE Women's Tag Team Championship throughout the summer. After defeating The IIconics at live events in Tokyo on June 28, The Kabuki Warriors received an opportunity against The IIconics for the tag team championship on the July 16 episode of SmackDown which they won by count out; however, The IIconics retained as titles do not change hands by count out unless stipulated.

On the August 5 episode of Raw, The Kabuki Warriors participated in a fatal four-way tag team elimination match for the WWE Women's Tag Team Championship but were the last ones eliminated by Alexa Bliss and Nikki Cross. They unsuccessfully challenged Bliss and Cross for the titles on the August 12 episode of Raw. The Kabuki Warriors received another title shot against Bliss and Cross at the Hell in a Cell event, where The Kabuki Warriors won the WWE Women's Tag Team Championship, after Asuka used green mist on Cross, thus showing signs of a villainous turn. The Kabuki Warriors were then drafted to the Raw brand on the October 14 episode of Raw. They solidified their status as villains on the October 28 episode of Raw by turning on their manager Paige when Asuka spat mist into Paige's face and thus ending their association with her.

The Kabuki Warriors retained the WWE Women's Tag Team Championship against Dakota Kai and Tegan Nox on the October 30 episode of NXT and Becky Lynch and Charlotte Flair on the November 11 episode of Raw. At Survivor Series, The Kabuki Warriors represented Raw in the 5-on-5-on-5 women's Survivor Series match against Team SmackDown and Team NXT, which Team NXT won. During the match, Asuka turned on her teammate Flair by spitting green mist on her, causing Flair to get eliminated, which led to The Kabuki Warriors beginning a feud with Lynch and Flair. They successfully defended the WWE Women's Tag Team Championship against Lynch and Flair, Alexa Bliss and Nikki Cross, and Bayley and Sasha Banks in a fatal four-way match at Starrcade. The Kabuki Warriors continued their feud with Lynch and Flair, which led to them defending the titles against Lynch and Flair in the namesake main event of the TLC: Tables, Ladders & Chairs event, which Kabuki Warriors retained. This led to Asuka entering a feud with Lynch in 2020 over the latter's Raw Women's Championship, which Asuka failed to win in subsequent matches at the Royal Rumble and the February 10 episode of Raw.

The Kabuki Warriors would then begin feuding with Alexa Bliss and Nikki Cross, which led to a match between the two teams at WrestleMania 36, where The Kabuki Warriors lost the titles back to Bliss and Cross. They unsuccessfully challenged Bliss and Cross for the titles in a rematch on the April 10 episode of SmackDown.

==== Asuka's Raw Women's Championship reign and first disbandment (2020) ====
On the April 13, 2020 episode of Raw, Asuka defeated Ruby Riott to qualify for the women's Money in the Bank ladder match while Kairi Sane lost to Nia Jax in a qualifying match. Asuka went on to win the match at the namesake event, thus winning the women's Money in the Bank contract which allowed her to cash in for a future title shot at the time and place of her choosing. The following night on Raw, however, Asuka was awarded the Raw Women's Championship by former champion Becky Lynch, who gave the title to Asuka due to her pregnancy, which led to Asuka embracing Lynch and it resulted in The Kabuki Warriors turning into fan favorites.

As the Raw Women's Champion, Asuka became the second Women's Grand Slam winner and the third Women's Triple Crown winner. The Kabuki Warriors then began feuding with Sasha Banks and Bayley as Banks and Asuka fought to a no contest at The Horror Show at Extreme Rules after Bayley interfered and counted the pinfall for Banks though Banks was not recognized as champion. On the July 27 episode of Raw, Sane was viciously attacked by Bayley backstage during the Raw Women's Championship match between Asuka and Sasha Banks which led to Asuka running to the backstage area where she was counted out and lost the title. This was done to write Sane out of the storylines as she announced her departure from WWE on Twitter as she was heading back to Japan to be with her husband, effectively disbanding The Kabuki Warriors.

=== Reunion (2023–2026) ===
==== Damage CTRL (2023–2025) ====
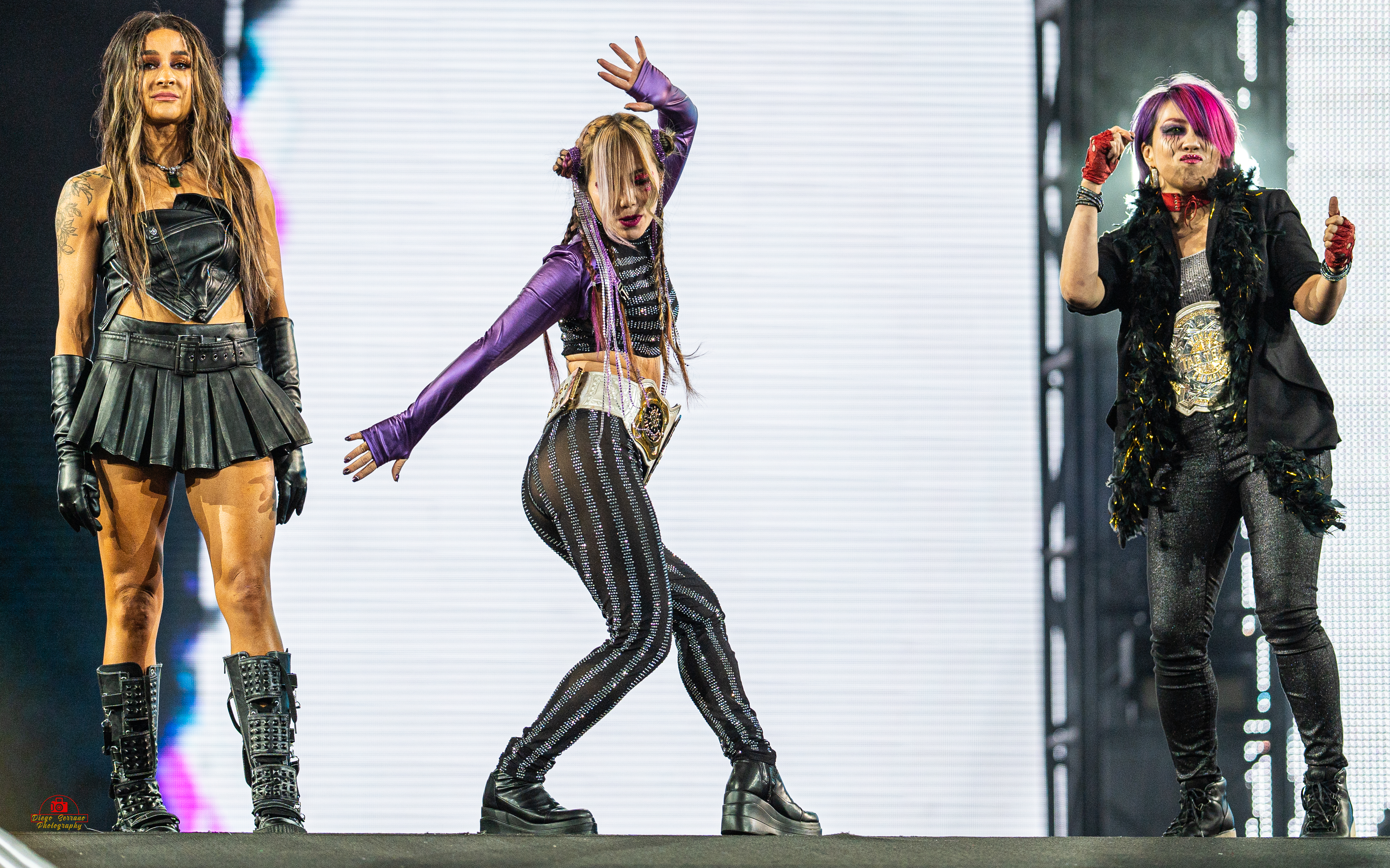
Damage CTRL (from left to right: Dakota Kai, Kairi Sane, and Asuka) at WrestleMania XL.

Sane returned to WWE at Crown Jewel on November 4, 2023, and assisted Iyo Sky in retaining her WWE Women's Championship, re-establishing herself as a heel. On the following episode of SmackDown, Sane forgave Bayley for her actions back in 2020 and joined Damage CTRL. Later that night, during a six-woman tag team match pitting Asuka with Bianca Belair and Charlotte Flair against Damage CTRL (Bayley, Sky, and Sane), Asuka turned on her teammates to reunite with Sane and Sky and subsequently joined Damage CTRL the following week. Damage CTRL faced the team of Belair, Flair, Shotzi and Becky Lynch in a WarGames match at Survivor Series: WarGames but were defeated after Lynch pinned Bayley. On the December 15 episode of SmackDown, Asuka and Sane defeated Michin and Zelina Vega in their first return tag team match as The Kabuki Warriors.

On the January 26, 2024 episode of SmackDown, The Kabuki Warriors defeated Katana Chance and Kayden Carter to become the new WWE Women's Tag Team Champions. This is The Kabuki Warriors' record-tying second reign as a team and Asuka's record-setting fourth reign individually as champion. The Kabuki Warriors went onto retain their titles against Chance and Carter in a rematch on the February 5 episode of Raw, and against Candice LeRae and Indi Hartwell at the Elimination Chamber: Perth pre-show. At NXT Roadblock on March 5, The Kabuki Warriors defeated Tatum Paxley and NXT Women's Champion Lyra Valkyria to retain their titles. At Backlash France on May 4, The Kabuki Warriors lost the WWE Women's Tag Team Championship to the team of Bianca Belair and Jade Cargill, ending their second reign at 99 days. Asuka later revealed that she was suffering from knee injury for months and had successfully undergo surgery. On the December 16 episode of Raw, Sane was found attacked backstage that was meant to write her off due to a legitimate injury. Sane was supposed to participate in the tournament to crown the inaugural Women's Intercontinental Champion alongside fellow Damage CTRL member Dakota Kai and was replaced by Sky. Damage CTRL was silently disbanded in May 2025.

==== Return from injuries and heel turn, second disbandment (2025–2026) ====
Sane returned from injury on the May 19 episode of Raw, where she participated in the triple threat match to qualify for the women's Money in the Bank ladder match, which was won by Rhea Ripley whereas Asuka returned from injury on the June 16 episode of Raw, where she won a fatal four-way first round qualifier of the Queen of the Ring tournament. Asuka made it to the tournament final at Night of Champions where she lost to Jade Cargill. On the July 7 episode of Raw, Asuka came to the aid of Sane from an attack by The Judgment Day (Raquel Rodriguez and Roxanne Perez). The Kabuki Warriors were subsequently scheduled to challenge for the WWE Women's Tag Team Championship held by Rodriguez and Perez in a fatal four-way tag team match at Evolution on July 13, where Rodriguez and Perez successfully retained their titles.

In August, tensions rise between Asuka and Sky, where the former contents that the latter should be accepting her help to win the Women's World Championship. On September 22 episode of Raw, Asuka lost to Ripley. Following the match, Asuka spew mist in Ripley's face and ordered a reluctant Sane to attack Ripley. Sky rushed out to stop them only to be attacked by the pair as well, turning both Asuka and Sane heel. At Crown Jewel on October 11, The Kabuki Warriors lost to Sky and Ripley. On the November 10 episode of Raw, The Kabuki Warriors defeated Alexa Bliss and Charlotte Flair to win their third WWE Women's Tag Team Championship. On Raw's Netflix Anniversary Show on January 5, 2026, The Kabuki Warriors lost the titles to Sky and Ripley, ending their third reign at 56 days. On April 20 on the Raw after WrestleMania 42, The Kabuki Warriors wrestled their last match as a tag team when they lost a tag team match to Rhea Ripley and Iyo Sky in Sane's last match with the company. On April 24, it was reported that Sane was released by WWE, disbanding the team for second time.

== Championships and accomplishments ==
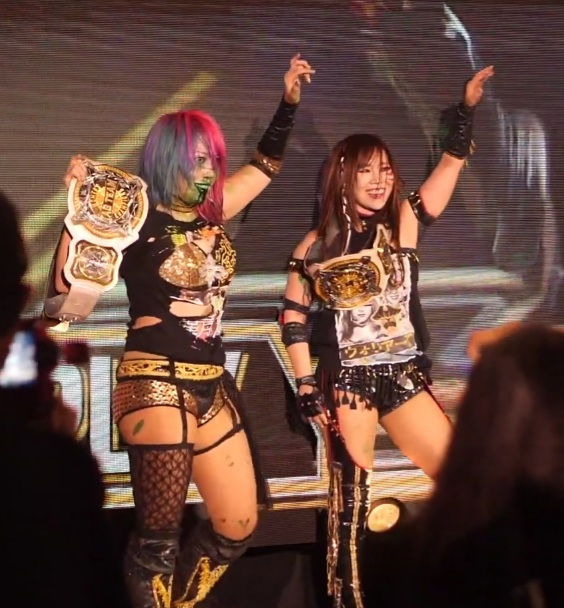
The Kabuki Warriors are three-time and the longest-reigning WWE Women's Tag Team Champions.

- Pro Wrestling Illustrated
  - Ranked No. 9 of the top 50 Tag Teams in the PWI Tag Team 50 in 2020
  - Ranked No. 3 of the top 100 female wrestlers in the PWI Women's 100 in 2020 – Asuka
  - Ranked No. 21 of the top 100 female wrestlers in the PWI Women's 100 in 2020 – Kairi Sane
- WWE
  - WWE Women's Tag Team Championship (3 times)
  - WWE Raw Women's Championship (1 time) – Asuka
  - Women's Money in the Bank (2020) – Asuka
  - Third Women's Triple Crown Champion – Asuka
  - Second Women's Grand Slam Champion – Asuka
  - WWE Year-End Award
    - Women's Tag Team of the Year (2019)
