= Aliyah (wrestler) =

Canadian professional wrestler (born 1994)

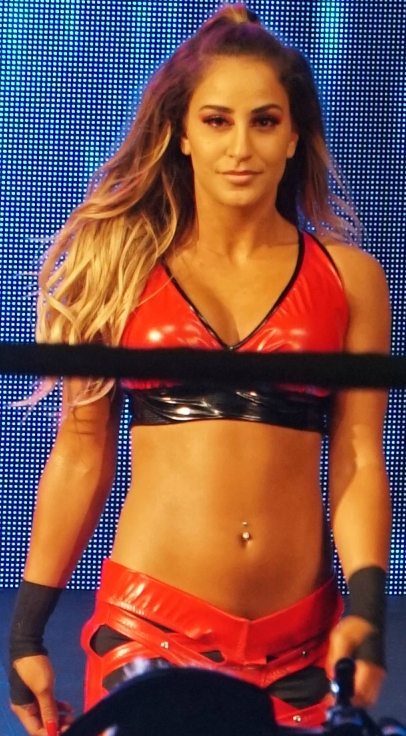
- Aliyah in April 2018

Personal information
- Born: Nhooph Al-Areebi; November 23, 1994 (age 31) Toronto, Ontario, Canada
- Education: George Brown College

Professional wrestling career
- Ring name(s): Aliyah; Jasmin; Jasmin Areebi; Nhooph Al-Areebi
- Billed height: 5 ft 3 in (160 cm)
- Billed weight: 112 lb (51 kg)
- Billed from: Toronto, Ontario, Canada
- Trained by: Rob Fuego; Jason Chase; WWE Performance Center
- Debut: January 20, 2013

Nhooph Al-Areebi (Arabic: نوف العريبي; born November 23, 1994) is a Canadian professional wrestler performing on the independent circuit under her real name. She is best known for her tenure in WWE from 2015 to 2023, where she performed under the ring name Aliyah. She is a former WWE Women's Tag Team Champion and holds the record for the fastest victory in WWE history at 3.17 seconds.

== Early life ==
Nhooph Al-Areebi was born in Toronto, Ontario. She’s of Iraqi descent on her father’s side and of Syrian descent on her mother’s side. Al-Areebi attended St. Joseph's College School, graduating in 2012, and later attended George Brown College, where she studied nursing. She also attended a circus training school. Al-Areebi decided to become a professional wrestler after watching Beth Phoenix and Mickie James compete at a taping of Raw on May 5, 2008.

== Professional wrestling career ==
=== Independent circuit (2013–2015) ===
Al-Areebi wrestled on the independent circuit under the ring name Jasmin Areebi, debuting for Squared Circle Wrestling (SCW) in Toronto in January 2013. She wrestled for a variety of promotions in Canada and the United States, including Pure Wrestling Association (PWA), Absolute Intense Wrestling (AIW), and New England Championship Wrestling (NECW).

=== WWE (2015–2023) ===
==== NXT (2015–2021) ====
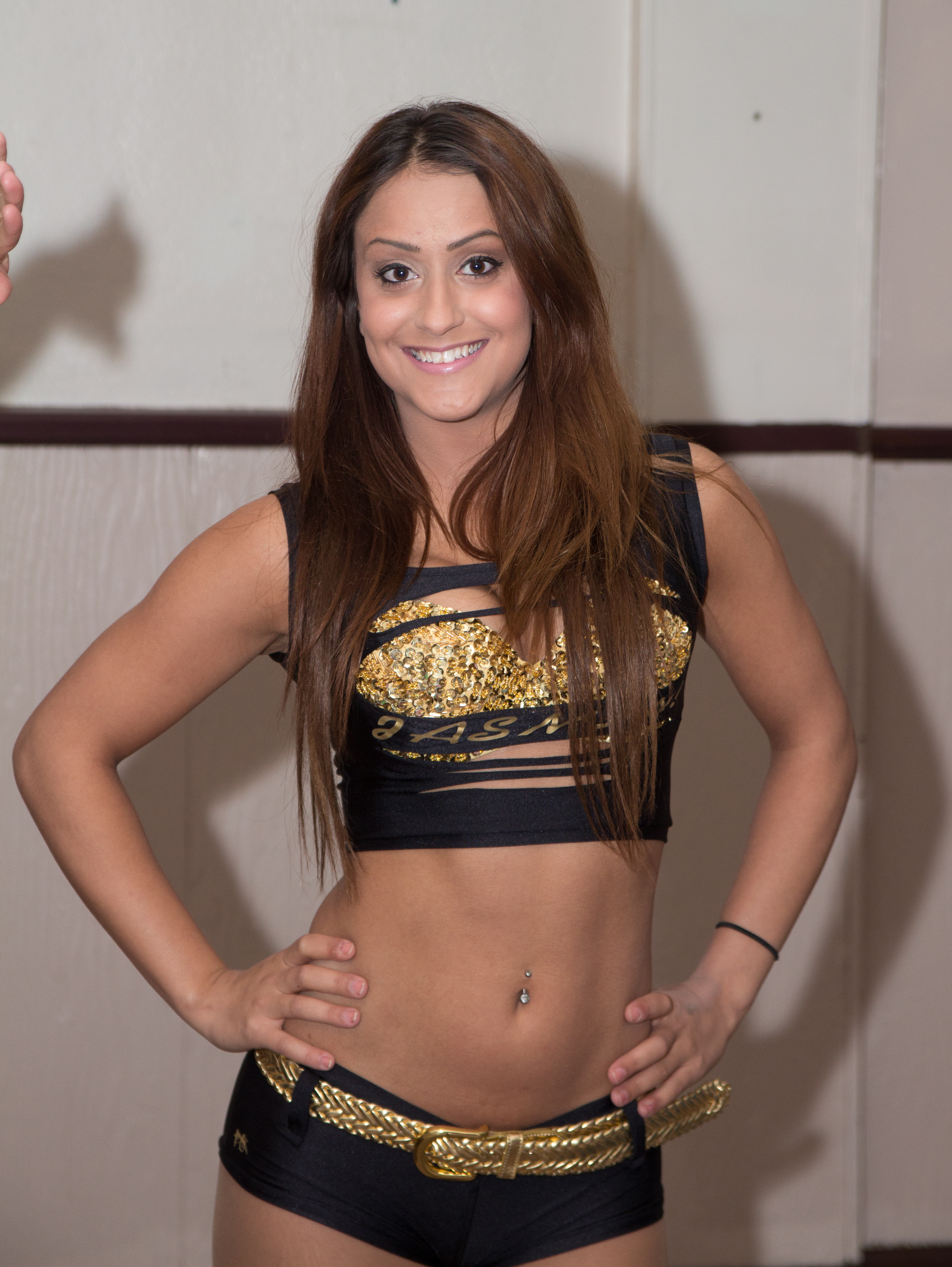
Aliyah in 2015

On March 17, 2015, it was reported that Al-Areebi had signed a developmental contract with WWE, being confirmed by the company one month later. She made her first appearance at the NXT TakeOver: Unstoppable event on May 20, as part of Tyler Breeze's entrance. She made her in–ring debut on June 20 during an NXT live event, where she competed in a six–person tag team match. In October, she was given the ring name Aliyah.

Aliyah's television debut took place on the January 12, 2016, episode of NXT, where she competed in a number one contender's battle royal for Bayley's NXT Women's Championship, which was won by Carmella. Towards the end of the year, Aliyah debuted new ring gear and entrance music, leaving her Arabian gimmick, and picked up her first victory as part of the brand, as she defeated Billie Kay after a distraction by Liv Morgan, only for both of them to be attacked by Kay and Peyton Royce. This set a six–woman tag team match between Aliyah, Morgan and Ember Moon against The Iconic Duo (Kay and Royce) and Daria Berenato, that was taped on NXT TakeOver: Toronto on November 19, where Aliyah's team was victorious.

On January 3, 2017, Aliyah made her first main roster appearance as she appeared on SmackDown Live, where she lost to Carmella. Throughout 2018, Aliyah continued losing to various competitors such as Lacey Evans, Ember Moon and Mae Young Classic winner Kairi Sane. On September, Aliyah as a heel, started a short alliance with Evans, and the two had an altercation with Dakota Kai and Deonna Purrazzo, which led to a tag team match, where Aliyah and Evans were victorious, making Aliyah's first victory in over a year. On February, she took time off television to get cosmetic surgery on her nose.

When she returned in 2020, she was written in a storyline where she tried to be included into the Robert Stone Brand, a stable led by Robert Stone. Stone joined forces with Aliyah on the June 17 and feuded with Rhea Ripley, facing her both of them at NXT: The Great American Bash.

==== SmackDown (2021–2023) ====
As part of the 2021 Draft, Aliyah was drafted to the SmackDown brand. Aliyah made her official main roster debut on the November 5 episode of SmackDown, where she participated in a backstage segment with Jeff Hardy and Sami Zayn. The following week, on the November 12 episode of SmackDown, Aliyah would have her debut match with the brand teaming with Naomi and Sasha Banks to defeat Shotzi, Shayna Baszler and Natalya. Later that same night, Sonya Deville removed her from the SmackDown Survivor Series team without explanation. She was eventually replaced by Toni Storm. In January, Aliyah would defeat Natalya, in 3.17 seconds, earning her the record for fastest victory in WWE history. At Royal Rumble, Aliyah competed in the 30-woman Royal Rumble match which was won by Ronda Rousey. On August 22 she made her Raw debut match against Bayley and was defeated. On the August 29 edition of Raw, Aliyah and Raquel Rodriguez defeated Dakota Kai and Iyo Sky to win the vacant WWE Women's Tag Team Championship. On September 12 episode of Raw they lost the WWE Women's Tag Team Championship to Kai and Sky, ending their reign at 14 days and it turned out to be her last match in WWE. On September 21, 2023, Aliyah was released from her WWE contract, ending her eight-year tenure with the company.

=== Destiny World Wrestling (2024–2025) ===
On November 3, 2024, Nhooph Al-Areebi defeated Tiffany Nieves to win the Destiny title. On February 16, 2025, Al-Areebi defeated Zayda Steel to ratain the title. On August 24, 2025, Al-Areebi would vacate the title.

== Other media ==
Al-Areebi's only video game appearance is in WWE 2K23.

== Championships and accomplishments ==
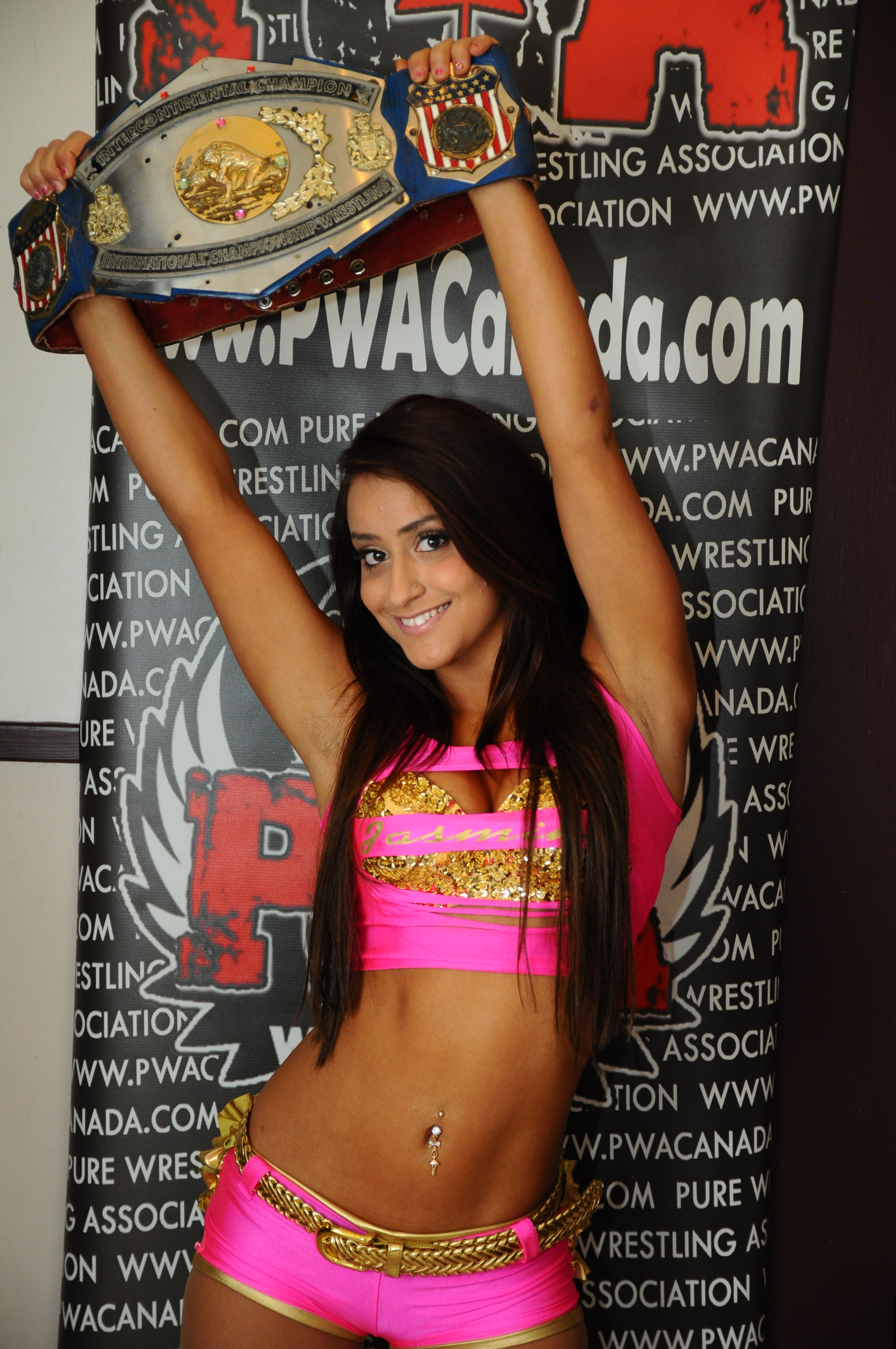
Aliyah is a one-time PWA Women's Champion

- Destiny World Wrestling
  - Destiny Women's Championship (1 time)
- Ground Xero Wrestling
  - GXW Women's Championship (1 time)
- Great Canadian Wrestling
  - GCW Women's Championship (1 time)
- Queens of Chaos
  - World Queens of Chaos Championship (1 time)
- Live Audio Wrestling End of Year Awards
  - Spinoff Series Awards (2 times)
    - Worst Wrestler: Female (2016)
    - Worst Match of the Year (2016) – with Liv Morgan
- Pro Wrestling Illustrated
  - Ranked No. 133 of the top 150 female singles wrestlers in the PWI Women's 150 in 2022
- Pure Wrestling Association
  - PWA Women's Championship (1 time)
- WWE
  - WWE Women's Tag Team Championship (1 time) – with Raquel Rodriguez
  - WWE Women’s Tag Team Championship Tournament (2022) – with Raquel Rodriguez
