= WWE Women's Tag Team Championship =

Professional wrestling championship

- The WWE Women's Tag Team Championship belt with default side plates

Details
- Promotion: WWE
- Brand: Raw (2019–present); SmackDown (2019–present); NXT (2019–2021, 2023–present)
- Date established: December 24, 2018
- Current champions: Michin and B-Fab
- Date won: October 23, 2026
Statistics
- First champions: The Boss 'n' Hug Connection (Bayley and Sasha Banks)
- Most reigns: As tag team (4 reigns): Liv Morgan and Raquel Rodriguez; As individual (6 reigns): Raquel Rodriguez
- Longest reign: As tag team: The Kabuki Warriors (Asuka and Kairi Sane) (1st reign, 180 days) (Note: WWE recognizes The Kabuki Warriors's first reign as lasting 180 days due to tape delay. It actually lasted either 171 or 172 days due to undisclosed taping dates during the 2020 COVID-19 pandemic.); As individual: Bianca Belair (177 days) (Note: Belair originally began her second reign with Jade Cargill, however, after Cargill suffered an injury (kayfabe), Belair was allowed to choose Naomi as her new championship partner. WWE recognizes this as a single uninterupted reign for Belair.)
- Shortest reign: Becky Lynch and Lyra Valkyria (1 day) (Note: WWE recognizes this reign as lasting less than a day.)
- Oldest champion: Lita (47 years, 319 days)
- Youngest champion: Roxanne Perez (23 years, 237 days)
- Heaviest champion: The Irresistible Forces (Nia Jax and Lash Legend) (408 lb (185 kg) combined)
- Lightest champion: Carmella and Queen Zelina (210 lb (95 kg) combined)

The WWE Women's Tag Team Championship is a professional wrestling women's world tag team championship created and promoted by the American promotion WWE. It is the only women's tag team championship in WWE, thus is defended across both main roster brand divisions, Raw and SmackDown, as well as the developmental brand NXT. The current champions are Michin and B-Fab from SmackDown, who are in their first reign, both as a team and individually. They won the title by defeating Alexa Bliss and Tatum Paxley on the October 23, 2026, episode of SmackDown.

The championship was announced on the December 24, 2018, episode of Monday Night Raw. Bayley and Sasha Banks, then going by the team name of The Boss 'n' Hug Connection, became the first champions in February 2019 and were part of the Raw brand during their inaugural reign. The title was originally established to be available to Raw, SmackDown, and NXT, but after a controversial finish to a title defense in March 2021, the NXT Women's Tag Team Championship was created, thus the WWE Women's Tag Team Championship became no longer available to NXT. After the titles were unified in June 2023, however, NXT's title was retired, and the WWE Women's Tag Team Championship became eligible to NXT once again. The title has been contested in the headlining match of one WWE pay-per-view and livestreaming event: TLC: Tables, Ladders & Chairs in 2019.

The title is distinct from the WWF Women's Tag Team Championship that was contested from 1983 to 1989 and does not share its lineage.

== History ==
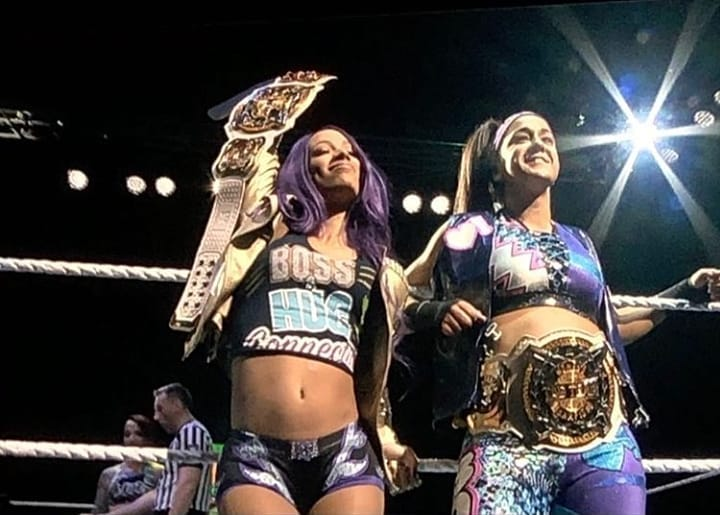
Inaugural and two-time champions The Boss 'n' Hug Connection (Sasha Banks and Bayley), who became the inaugural champions at Elimination Chamber 2019; during their second reign, they did not use their previous team name.

In 1989, the then-World Wrestling Federation (WWF) abandoned the WWF Women's Tag Team Championship due to a lack of women's tag teams in the division. This remained true up through the 2000s—in 2002, the WWF was renamed to World Wrestling Entertainment (WWE). In the early 2010s, the women's division began growing, and in 2012, WWE.com ran an article supporting the resurrection of the Women's Tag Team Championship. In 2014, The Bella Twins (Brie Bella and Nikki Bella) discussed a desire to establish a Divas Tag Team Championship—from 1999 to 2016, female performers were referred to as Divas and their top championship from 2010 to 2016 was the WWE Divas Championship. The idea for a women's tag team championship was seemingly forgotten about until mid-2018; in an interview with Sky Sports, WWE's Chief Brand Officer at the time, Stephanie McMahon, stated that in regards to the title debuting, "Not quite yet, but that's absolutely something we've heard loud and clear from our fan base and it's something we're keen on implementing as soon as we are able to". Prior to WWE's first all-female pay-per-view (PPV) and livestreaming event, Evolution, in October, speculations—including comments from the company's female performers—arose that the promotion would debut the title at the event. Just prior to the event, Stephanie said that the title would be coming "sooner than we think"; however, it was not debuted at Evolution. Speculation died down after the event, however, on the December 3, 2018, episode of Monday Night Raw, when questioned by a fan about what they wanted to bring to the women's division in 2019, Bayley and Sasha Banks stated that they wanted to become the inaugural WWE Women's Tag Team Champions.

During the December 24, 2018, special Christmas episode of Raw, WWE's Chairman and Chief Executive Officer at the time, Vince McMahon, officially announced that a new WWE Women's Tag Team Championship would be introduced in 2019. On the January 14, 2019, episode of Raw, the championship belts were unveiled by Alexa Bliss during her segment, "A Moment of Bliss". After the unveiling, Bliss announced that the inaugural champions would be decided at Elimination Chamber on February 17, 2019, in a tag team Elimination Chamber match, featuring three teams from Raw and three teams from SmackDown, making the title available to both brands. On the February 18 episode of Raw, it was revealed that the titles could also be defended on the NXT brand. To determine the three teams from Raw, qualification matches were held and began on the January 28 episode of Raw. The teams of Nia Jax and Tamina, and The Riott Squad (Liv Morgan and Sarah Logan) qualified by defeating the teams of Alexa Bliss and Mickie James, and Natalya and Dana Brooke, respectively. The following week, The Boss 'n' Hug Connection (Bayley and Sasha Banks) defeated Alicia Fox and Nikki Cross to win Raw's final spot. No qualification matches were held to determine the three teams from SmackDown due to its smaller roster, and instead, each team declared their participation. The team of Mandy Rose and Sonya Deville announced theirs on the January 29 episode of SmackDown Live, The IIconics (Billie Kay and Peyton Royce) confirmed their entry via Twitter, and Carmella and Naomi accepted the final spot on the February 5 episode. The Boss 'n' Hug Connection would go on and win the match, lastly eliminating Rose and Deville by way of Banks submitting Deville, to become the inaugural champions. The title headlined a pay-per-view and livestreaming event for the first time at TLC: Tables, Ladders & Chairs in 2019. The Kabuki Warriors (Asuka and Kairi Sane) defended the championship against Becky Lynch and Charlotte Flair in the first women's tag team Tables, Ladders, and Chairs match, where The Kabuki Warriors retained.

On the March 3, 2021, episode of NXT, reigning WWE Women's Tag Team Champions Nia Jax and Shayna Baszler defended the championship against NXT's Dakota Kai and Raquel González, who had earned the title opportunity for winning the inaugural Women's Dusty Rhodes Tag Team Classic. The match ended in controversy, however, as the referee was taken out and Adam Pearce, the WWE official of Raw and SmackDown at the time, sent a second referee to the ring, who ruled that Kai submitted to Baszler, although Kai was not the legal woman. The following week, in response to the controversy, then-NXT General Manager William Regal established the NXT Women's Tag Team Championship for the brand as to not deal with Raw and SmackDown's politics any longer, and awarded the championship to Kai and González. The WWE Women's Tag Team Championship effectively became no longer available to NXT.

During the May 16, 2022, episode of Raw, reigning champions Naomi and Sasha Banks reportedly walked out after a meeting with Vince McMahon due to a creative dispute. WWE released an official statement, in which the company stated that Naomi and Banks "walked into WWE Head of Talent Relations John Laurinaitis' office with their suitcases in hand, placed their tag team championship belts on his desk and walked out". The two were originally booked for the show's main event, which had to be reworked. On the following episode of SmackDown, it was announced that Naomi and Banks had been suspended indefinitely, therefore the title was vacated (they both later left the company although Naomi returned in January 2024). A tournament was also announced to determine new champions. On the August 5 episode of SmackDown, Adam Pearce announced that the tournament would begin on the August 8 episode of Raw. Although the championship was no longer defended on NXT, one team from the brand competed in the tournament as part of the SmackDown bracket. The team of Aliyah and Raquel Rodriguez (formerly Raquel González) won the tournament to win the vacant championship.

As a result of the 2023 WWE Draft, reigning NXT Women's Tag Team Champions Alba Fyre and Isla Dawn were drafted to SmackDown and took the titles with them, claiming they would defend the title across all three brands, although they never did and only had non-title matches on SmackDown. On the June 9 episode, as they were about to have an in-ring interview, Fyre and Dawn were interrupted by reigning WWE Women's Tag Team Champions Ronda Rousey and Shayna Baszler, who challenged Fyre and Dawn to a championship unification match, which was accepted and scheduled for the June 23 episode of SmackDown. Rousey and Baszler won to become the undisputed WWE Women's Tag Team Champions, thus making the WWE Women's Tag Team Championship available to NXT once again. The NXT Women's Tag Team Championship was subsequently retired in the process. According to Fightful, the unification match was planned to happen right after the draft, but due to various injuries within the division, it got delayed. Fightful also noted there had been confusion regarding the original creation of the NXT Women's Tag Team Championship, as the company already had the WWE Women's Tag Team Championship and there were not many women's tag teams in the division. Furthermore, it was noted that the plan after the unification was that the WWE Women's Tag Team Championship would appear on NXT programming "when needed", which was the original plan for the title.

=== WWE Women's Tag Team Championship Tournament (2022) ===
After Naomi and Sasha Banks had been suspended indefinitely and the WWE Women's Tag Team Championship had been vacated, SmackDown commentator Michael Cole announced that there would be a tournament to declare new champions.

Quarterfinals; Raw; August 8–15, 2022; SmackDown; August 12–19, 2022
Dana Brooke and Tamina	10:00
Dakota Kai and Iyo Sky	Pinfall
Raw
Alexa Bliss and Asuka	Submission
Doudrop and Nikki A.S.H.	9:00
Aliyah and Raquel Rodriguez	Pinfall
Shotzi and Xia Li	9:35
SmackDown
Toxic Attraction (NXT) (Note: Toxic Attraction replaced Nikkita Lyons and Zoey Stark because Stark was not medically cleared to compete and Lyons was denied entry to Canada due to her being unvaccinated against COVID-19.) (Gigi Dolin and Jacy Jayne)	Pinfall
Natalya and Sonya Deville	8:48

Semifinals; Raw; August 22, 2022; SmackDown; August 26, 2022
Dakota Kai and Iyo Sky	Pinfall
Alexa Bliss and Asuka	18:30
Aliyah and Raquel Rodriguez	Pinfall
Natalya and Sonya Deville (Note: Toxic Attraction was removed from the tournament due to an injury suffered by Dolin. Natalya and Sonya Deville replaced them after winning in a "Last Chance" fatal four-way match against Dana Brooke and Tamina, Doudrop and Nikki A.S.H., and Shotzi and Xia Li on the August 26 episode of SmackDown.)	8:00

Final; Raw; August 29, 2022
Dakota Kai and Iyo Sky	11:30
Aliyah and Raquel Rodriguez	Pinfall

== Belt design ==
The championship belts were unveiled by wrestler Alexa Bliss on the January 14, 2019, episode of Raw. The belts feature three plates on a white leather strap, which is smaller than the men's titles. The three plates are outlined in gold while the inner portion is mostly silver. The WWE logo is affixed at the top of the circular center plate, which has four protruding edges. At the center, the word "Tag Team" is prominently written in gold. Above that is a gold banner that reads "Women's" while below is a gold banner that reads "Champions". The design uses Greek-based elements, such as the center plate being encircled by a meander pattern with a margent ornamentation in the inner circle (the men's tag titles for WWE Tag Team Championship and World Tag Team Championship were also Greek inspired prior to their respective redesigns in 2024). Like all of WWE's championship belts, the two side plates feature a removable center section that can be customized with the champion's logos; the default side plates feature the WWE logo on a globe. Generally, the reigning team will have one side plate on each belt dedicated to each champion, unless the team has a name (e.g., The Kabuki Warriors).

== Reigns ==
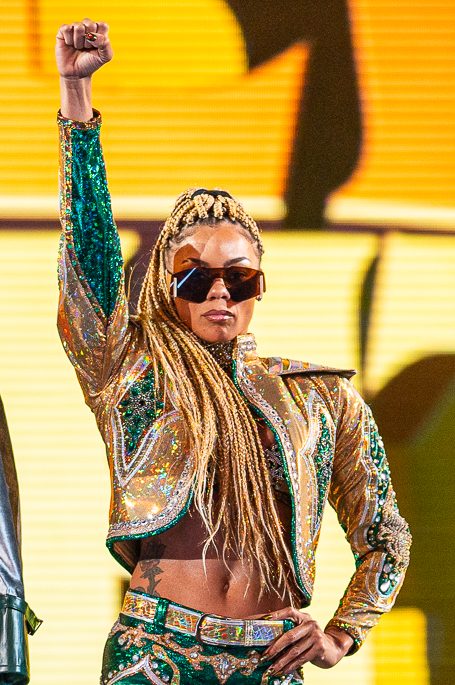
Current champions Michin and B-Fab

As of November 1, 2026, there have been 39 reigns between 29 teams composed of 44 individual champions and two vacancies. The inaugural championship team was Bayley and Sasha Banks, who at the time went by the team name of The Boss 'n' Hug Connection. Liv Morgan and Raquel Rodriguez have the most reigns as a team at four, while individually, Raquel Rodriguez has the most reigns at six. As a team, The Kabuki Warriors (Asuka and Kairi Sane) have the longest reign at 171–172 days (180 days as recognized by WWE due to tape delay), while the team of Becky Lynch and Lyra Valkyria have the shortest reign at 1 day (less than a day as recognized by WWE). As a team, The Kabuki Warriors have the longest combined reign at 270–271 days (278 days as recognized by WWE due to tape delay), while individually, Asuka has the longest combined reign at 317–318 days (323 days as recognized by WWE due to tape delay). Lita is the oldest champion, winning the title at 47 years old, while Roxanne Perez is the youngest, winning it at 23.

Michin and B-Fab from SmackDown are the current champions in their first reign, both as a team and individually. They won the title by defeating Alexa Bliss and Tatum Paxley on the October 23, 2026, episode of SmackDown in Ontario, California.

== See also ==
- Tag team championships in WWE
- Women's championships in WWE
- Women's World Tag Team Championship

== Notes ==
Sporting positions
Preceded by WWF Women's Tag Team Championship	WWE's women’s tag team championship 2019–present	Succeeded by Current
