= Elimination Chamber (2025) =

WWE premium live event

- Promotional poster featuring John Cena and the Elimination Chamber structure
- Promotion: WWE
- Brand(s): Raw; SmackDown
- Date: March 1, 2025
- City: Toronto, Ontario, Canada
- Venue: Rogers Centre
- Attendance: 38,493

WWE event chronology
← Previous; NXT Vengeance Day	Next → NXT Stand & Deliver

Elimination Chamber chronology
← Previous; 2024	Next → 2026

WWE in Canada chronology
← Previous; Survivor Series: WarGames	Next → —

The 2025 Elimination Chamber, also promoted as Elimination Chamber: Toronto (known as No Escape: Toronto in Germany), was a professional wrestling premium live event (PLE) produced by the American company WWE, held for wrestlers from the promotion's main roster brands, Raw and SmackDown. It was the 15th Elimination Chamber event and took place on Saturday, March 1, 2025, at Rogers Centre in Toronto, Ontario, Canada.

The event centered on the Elimination Chamber match, a type of roofed steel cage that surrounds the ring and ringside area with no disqualifications; the objective is to eliminate all other opponents either by pinfall or submission. At the 2024 event, both the men's and women's matches featured wrestlers from both brands and the respective winners earned a world championship match at WrestleMania, specifically for the respective championships that were not chosen by the Royal Rumble match winners the prior month. The 2025 event adopted this format, becoming standard for the event. As a result of the respective 2025 Royal Rumble winners choosing Raw's men's world championship and SmackDown's women's world championship, the respective Elimination Chamber winners earned matches for SmackDown's Undisputed WWE Championship and Raw's Women's World Championship at WrestleMania 41.

The event comprised four matches. The main event was the men's Elimination Chamber match, which was won by John Cena, marking his record-tying fourth win, while the women's match, which was the opening bout and also featured one wrestler from NXT, was won by SmackDown's Bianca Belair, becoming the first woman to win two Elimination Chamber matches. In the other matches on the card, Tiffany Stratton and Greater Toronto Area native Trish Stratus defeated Nia Jax and Candice LeRae in a tag team match while Canada native Kevin Owens defeated fellow Canadian Sami Zayn in an unsanctioned match. The event saw the returns of Randy Orton and Jade Cargill. It was also notable for Cena's heel turn, as well as being his final Elimination Chamber appearance and last PLE appearance in Canada as an in-ring performer due to his retirement from professional wrestling at the end of 2025.

This was the third Elimination Chamber to not take place in February, after the 2015 and 2020 events. It was also the first Elimination Chamber to broadcast on Netflix in most international markets and WWE's final PLE to broadcast on SonyLIV in India due to its content moving to Netflix on April 1. This was also the final Elimination Chamber to broadcast on Peacock in the United States as ESPN's direct-to-consumer streaming service assumed the streaming rights to the main roster PLEs in the US beginning in September, as well as the final Elimination Chamber on Disney+ in the Philippines, which moved to Netflix on January 1, 2026. This was also the first WWE event held at the venue since WrestleMania X8 in 2002 when it was known as the SkyDome and the first Elimination Chamber event in Toronto. It was the second Elimination Chamber overall in Canada, after 2023, and the fourth consecutive Elimination Chamber event held outside of the United States. This was also the first PLE to not feature a championship defense since Survivor Series in 2021.

== Production ==
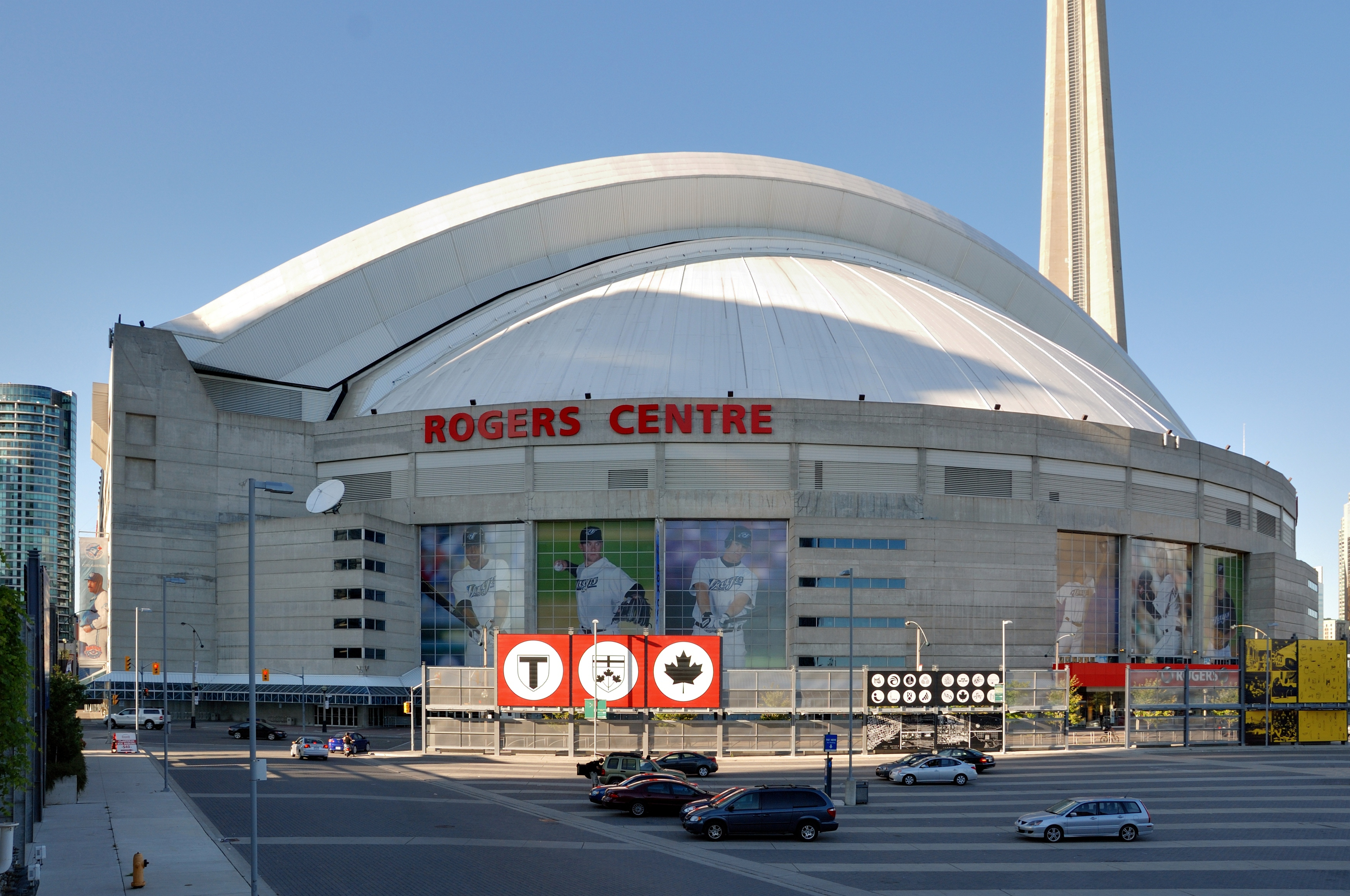
The 15th Elimination Chamber event was held at Rogers Centre in Toronto, Ontario, Canada, marking WWE's first event at the venue since WrestleMania X8 in 2002 when it was known as the SkyDome.

=== Background ===
Elimination Chamber is a professional wrestling premium live event (PLE) first produced by the American promotion WWE in 2010. It has been held every year since, except in 2016, generally in February. It was originally broadcast exclusively via pay-per-view (PPV) before it began simulcasting on WWE's livestreaming platforms in 2015. The concept of the event is that two main event matches are contested inside the Elimination Chamber.

Announced on November 8, 2024, the 15th Elimination Chamber event was scheduled to take place on Saturday, March 1, 2025, at Rogers Centre in Toronto, Ontario, Canada, and featured wrestlers from the Raw and SmackDown brand divisions, with the event promoted as Elimination Chamber: Toronto. This marked the second Elimination Chamber event to be held in Canada, after 2023, and the fourth consecutive to be held outside of the United States, after the 2022, 2023, and 2024 events, which were held in Saudi Arabia, Canada (Montreal), and Australia, respectively. This also marked WWE's first event to be held at the Rogers Centre since WrestleMania X8 in 2002 when the stadium was still known as the SkyDome. This was also the second Elimination Chamber event to have a subtitle named after its host city and to take place in an outdoor venue, both after 2024. The official theme song for the event was "New Way Out" by Poppy.

The Elimination Chamber match is an elimination-based match contested in a type of large roofed steel cage that surrounds the wrestling ring with an elevated platform around the ring. Within the Chamber are four inner pods, one behind each ring post. The match is contested by six participants. Two wrestlers start the match, while the other four are held within each inner pod with one selected randomly to enter the match at regular intervals, which continues until all four have been released. The objective is to eliminate all other opponents by pinfall or submission, and there are no disqualifications or count-outs. At the 2024 event, the respective men's and women's winners earned a world championship match at that year's WrestleMania, specifically for the respective championships that were not chosen by the previous month's Royal Rumble match winners, with the 2025 event adopting this format, becoming standard for the event.

In 2011 and since 2013, the event has been promoted as "No Escape" in Germany as it was feared that the name "Elimination Chamber" may remind people of the gas chambers used during the Holocaust; it was promoted as "No Way Out" in 2010 and 2012.

=== Broadcast outlets ===
The PLE was broadcast on traditional PPV outlets worldwide. It was also available to livestream on Peacock in the United States, SonyLIV in India, SuperSport in Sub-Saharan Africa, Disney+ in the Philippines, Abema in Japan, Netflix in most other international markets, and the WWE Network in a select few countries that had not yet transferred to Netflix due to pre-existing contracts. This marked the first Elimination Chamber to livestream on Netflix following the WWE Network's merger under the service in January 2025 in those areas.

Rogers Communications, the owner of Rogers Centre, has been a longstanding partner of WWE and its parent company TKO, having been its broadcast and WWE Network distribution partner in Canada from 2014 to 2024, and continuing as the Canadian broadcast partner of co-owned mixed martial arts promotion Ultimate Fighting Championship (UFC), WWE's sister company under TKO.

=== Storylines ===
The event comprised four matches that resulted from scripted storylines. Results were predetermined by WWE's writers on the Raw and SmackDown brands, while storylines were produced on WWE's weekly television shows, Monday Night Raw and Friday Night SmackDown.

On July 6, 2024, at Money in the Bank, John Cena officially announced that he would retire from professional wrestling at the end of 2025, having wrestled for WWE since 2002 (though part-time since 2018). Cena also stated that he would compete at Elimination Chamber, which would be his last Elimination Chamber event. After losing the Royal Rumble match at the 2025 Royal Rumble, during the event's post-show, Cena declared that he would compete in the men's Elimination Chamber match as it would be his last time at an opportunity to compete for a world championship in the main event of a WrestleMania. The next day, Raw General Manager Adam Pearce announced that qualifying matches for the remaining spots would begin the following night on Raw. CM Punk won the first qualifier by defeating Sami Zayn. The third spot was determined on the February 7 episode of SmackDown, where Drew McIntyre defeated Jimmy Uso and LA Knight in a triple threat match. The fourth spot was determined on the February 10 episode of Raw, where Logan Paul defeated Rey Mysterio. The fifth spot was determined on the February 14 episode of SmackDown by another triple threat match where Damian Priest defeated Braun Strowman and Jacob Fatu, while the final spot was determined on the February 17 episode of Raw where Seth "Freakin" Rollins defeated Finn Bálor. As a result of Royal Rumble winner Jey Uso choosing to challenge Gunther for Raw's World Heavyweight Championship at WrestleMania 41, this confirmed that the winner of the men's Elimination Chamber match would challenge Cody Rhodes for SmackDown's Undisputed WWE Championship at WrestleMania.

Qualifiers for the women's Elimination Chamber match also began on the February 3 episode of Raw. Liv Morgan won the first qualifier by defeating Iyo Sky by disqualification due to inadvertent interference from Women's World Champion Rhea Ripley. The second and third spots were determined on the February 7 episode of SmackDown, where Bianca Belair and Alexa Bliss defeated Piper Niven and Candice LeRae, respectively. The fourth spot was determined on the February 10 episode of Raw, where Bayley defeated Lyra Valkyria. The fifth spot was determined on the February 14 episode of SmackDown, where Naomi defeated Chelsea Green, while the final spot was determined on the February 17 episode of Raw where NXT's Roxanne Perez defeated Raquel Rodriguez. As a result of Royal Rumble winner Charlotte Flair choosing to challenge Tiffany Stratton for SmackDown's WWE Women's Championship at WrestleMania 41, this confirmed that the winner of the women's Elimination Chamber match would challenge for Raw's Women's World Championship at WrestleMania.

In June 2024, Tiffany Stratton and Nia Jax formed an alliance. During this time, Stratton won the Money in the Bank ladder match at the namesake event in July, while Jax won the WWE Women's Championship at SummerSlam in August. In October, Jax also formed an alliance with Candice LeRae. After months of teasing, Stratton finally turned on Jax and successfully cashed in her Money in the Bank contract on Jax on the January 3 episode of SmackDown to win the WWE Women's Championship. At the Royal Rumble on February 1, WWE Hall of Famer and Greater Toronto Area native Trish Stratus entered the namesake match at #25 and eliminated LeRae only for Jax to eliminate Stratus. On the February 14 episode of SmackDown, Jax had a rematch for the championship, however, the match ended in a disqualification win for Stratton after LeRae attacked Stratton. Following the match, Jax and LeRae continued to attack Stratton prompting Stratus, who was in the crowd, to come in and assist Stratton. Stratus then proposed to team up with Stratton at Elimination Chamber and a tag team match featuring Stratus and Stratton against Jax and LeRae was subsequently made official.

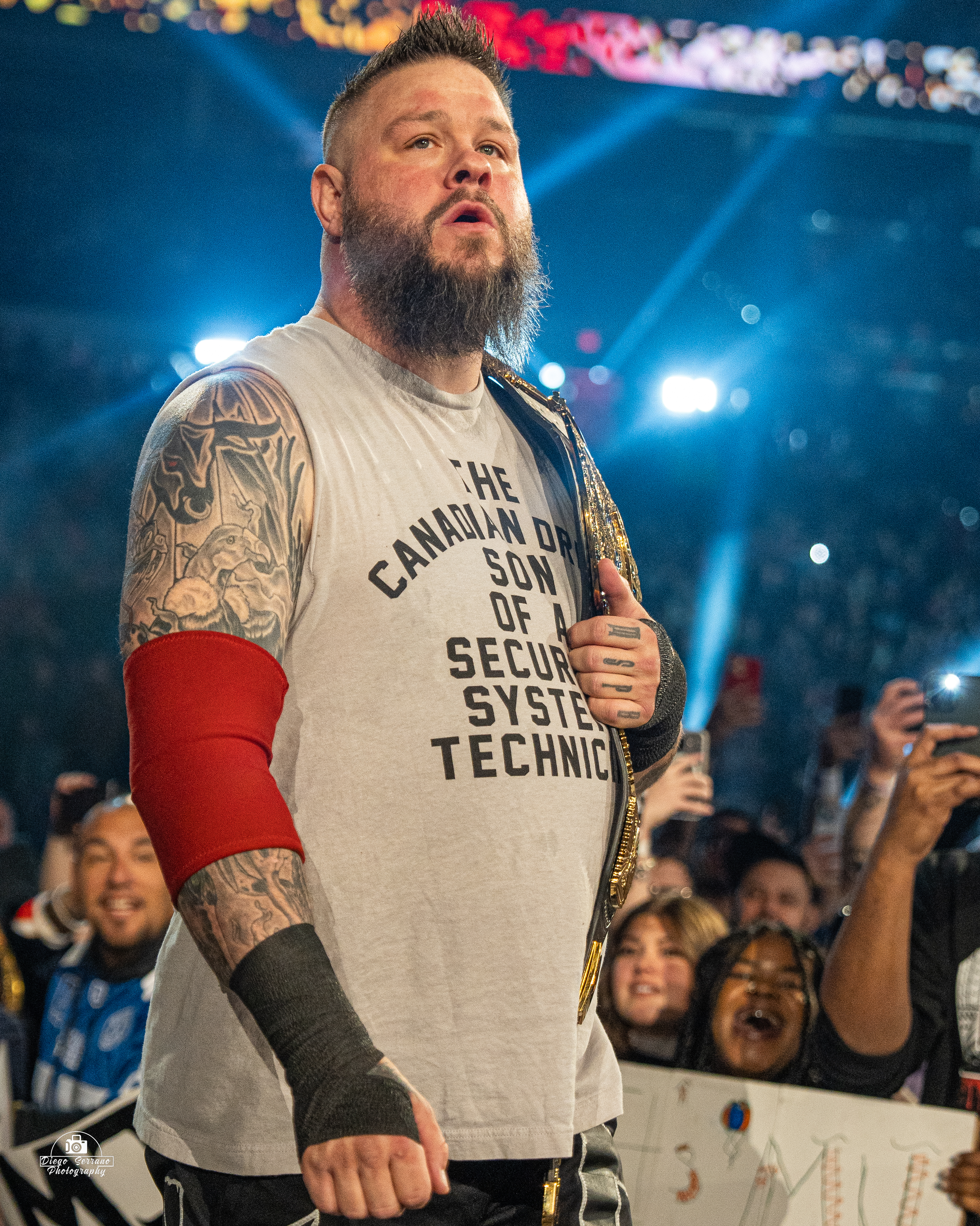
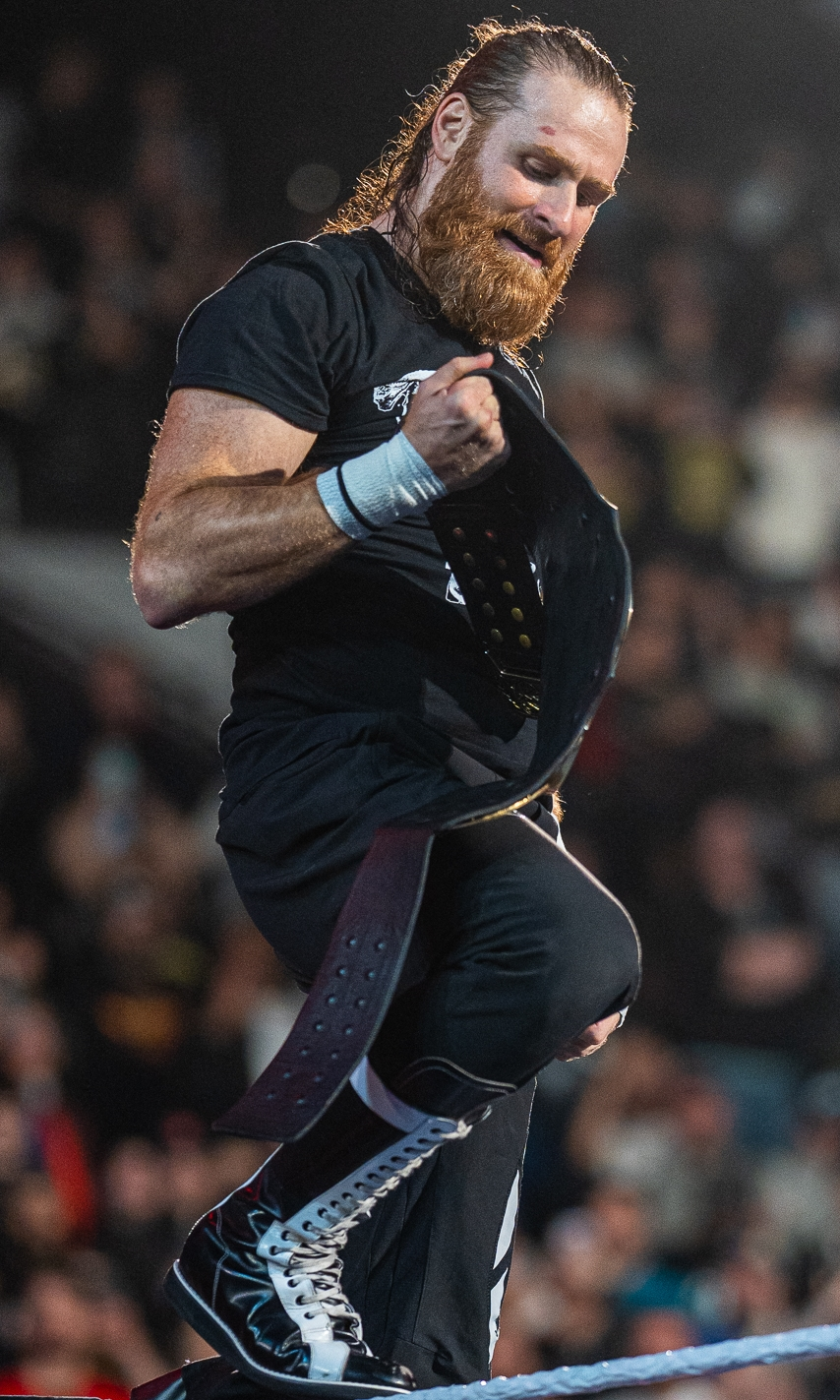
Canadians Kevin Owens and Sami Zayn fought in an Unsanctioned match

On the January 20 episode of Raw, Sami Zayn spoke about his hopes of winning the Royal Rumble match before being interrupted by longtime friend Kevin Owens. Owens supported him, assuring Zayn that he could win the Royal Rumble match, and that he would back him in his ladder match against Cody Rhodes for the Undisputed WWE Championship also at the Royal Rumble. At the event, Owens lost to Rhodes, and although Zayn was at ringside to check on Owens, he did not get involved in the match. Zayn also failed to win the Royal Rumble match that night. On the following episode of Raw, after Zayn failed to qualify for the Elimination Chamber match, Owens attacked Zayn with a package piledriver, injuring him and ruling him out of action indefinitely. Zayn would later state on social media that when he was medically cleared to wrestle, he would be coming for Owens, who responded by claiming that Zayn's refusal to help him during his championship match was a betrayal. Owens also challenged Zayn to a match at Elimination Chamber, regardless of whether or not Zayn would be medically cleared. On the February 17 episode of Raw, Zayn accepted Owens's challenge to a match in their home country, but Raw General Manager Adam Pearce refused to sanction the match due to Zayn's injury. Zayn did not leave the ring until Pearce agreed to make an unsanctioned match between the two official for Elimination Chamber.

On the February 21 episode of SmackDown, TKO Board of Directors member Dwayne "The Rock" Johnson made a special appearance where he called out Undisputed WWE Champion Cody Rhodes. Rock stated that although they stood against each other at WrestleMania XL the prior year, they had since become friends. Although Rock praised Rhodes for becoming a great champion and a champion of the people, he wanted Rhodes to be his champion. Rock claimed that he could elevate Rhodes's career even higher and could make anything possible for Rhodes and he would be present at Elimination Chamber to get Rhodes's answer.

== Event ==
Other on-screen personnel
Role:	Name:
English commentators	Michael Cole
English commentators	Wade Barrett
English commentators	Pat McAfee
Spanish commentators	Marcelo Rodríguez
Spanish commentators	Jerry Soto
Ring announcer	Alicia Taylor
Referees	Danilo Anfibio
Referees	Jason Ayers
Referees	Dan Engler
Referees	Dallas Irvin
Referees	Daphanie LaShaunn
Referees	Eddie Orengo
Referees	Chad Patton
Referees	Charles Robinson
Referees	Ryan Tran
Referees	Rod Zapata
Interviewer	Cathy Kelley
Interviewer	Byron Saxton
Pre-show panel	Jackie Redmond
Pre-show panel	Big E
Pre-show panel	Peter Rosenberg
Pre-show panel	Joe Tessitore

=== Preliminary matches ===
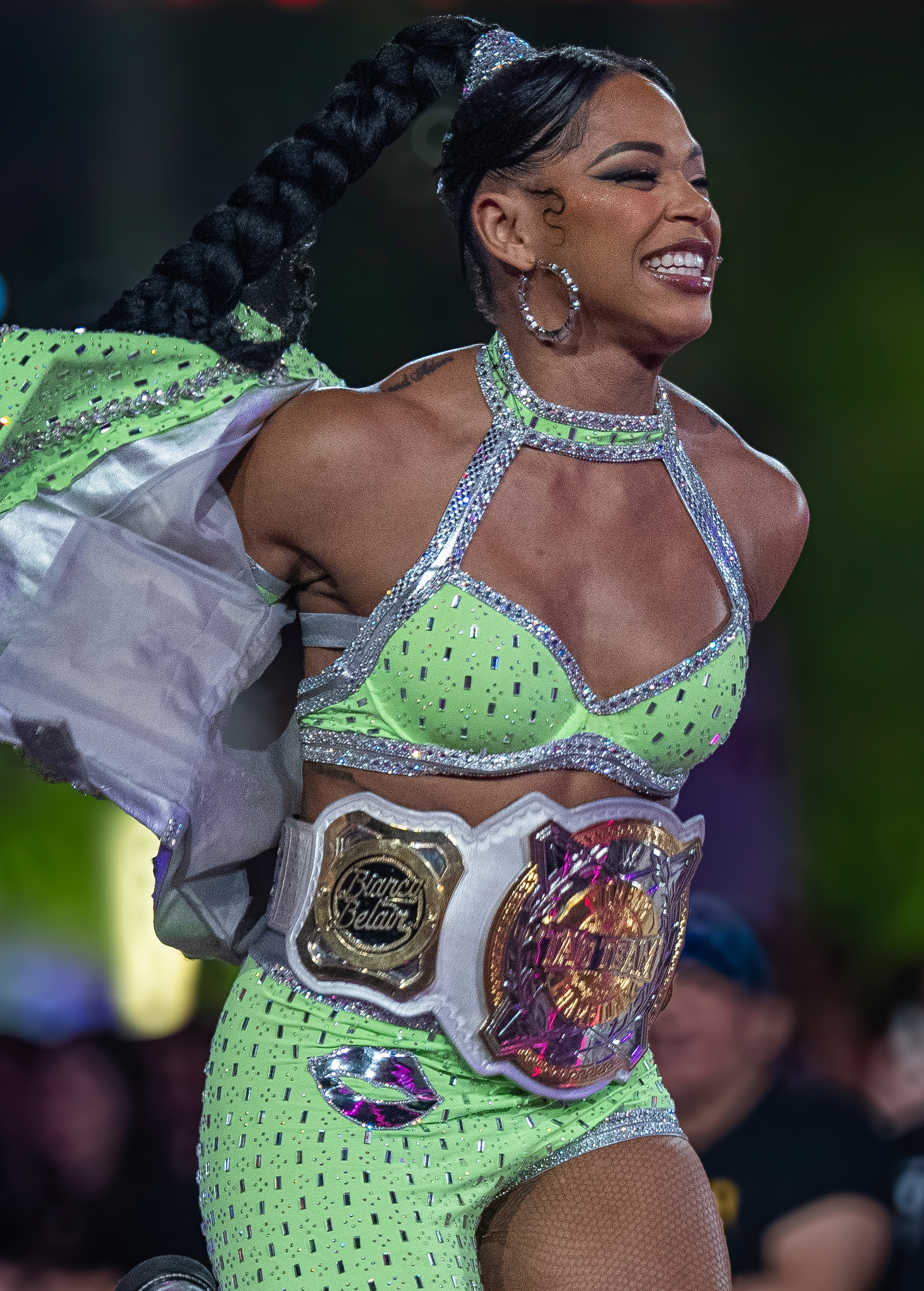
Bianca Belair won the Women's Elimination Chamber match for the second time in her career, becoming the first woman to win multiple Elimination Chamber matches.

The PLE began with the women's Elimination Chamber match where the winner would earn a Women's World Championship match at WrestleMania 41. Liv Morgan and Naomi began the match. Before the match officially began, Jade Cargill, who was last seen in December, returned from injury. Cargill instead viciously attacked Naomi, confirming that it was Naomi who had attacked Cargill back then. Cargill attacked Naomi in the corner in front of Bianca Belair's pod, before sending her into a turnbuckle, the chamber wall, the pods of Bayley and Alexa Bliss, and finished by slamming the chamber door into Naomi's head before leaving. The match then officially began and Morgan taunted Belair as Naomi was announced as no longer able to compete, and thus eliminated. Belair entered next, followed by Roxanne Perez, Bayley and Bliss. Perez slammed Bayley into the chamber wall and attempted a moonsault on Bayley, however, Bayley countered. As Bayley attempted a Rose Plant on Perez, Morgan intercepted and performed Oblivion on Bayley to eliminate her. Morgan climbed the top of a chamber pod, where Belair used her braid to whip Morgan, knocking her off the pod. Belair performed a crossbody on Morgan, Perez, and Bliss. Morgan and Perez both performed a powerbomb on Belair and Bliss from the top turnbuckle. Morgan performed a codebreaker on Perez followed by Bliss performing Twisted Bliss on Perez to eliminate her. Morgan performed a jackknife cover on Bliss to eliminate her. In the end, after trading counters, Belair countered Morgan's Oblivion and performed the Kiss of Death to win the match. Following the match, Women's World Champion Rhea Ripley and Iyo Sky, who challenged Ripley for the title on the March 3 episode of Raw, confronted Belair on the stage.

Next, Trish Stratus and WWE Women's Champion Tiffany Stratton took on Nia Jax and Candice LeRae. In the climax, Stratus performed a top-rope Stratusfaction on Jax and Stratus attempted a pin on Jax. LeRae tried to break up the pin with a Lionsault, however, Stratus moved out of the way and LeRae struck Jax instead. Stratton then performed the Prettiest Moonsault Ever on Jax to win the match.

In the penultimate match, Sami Zayn and Kevin Owens fought in an unsanctioned match. Throughout the match, they used various weapons and fought all over the arena, but they continued the match. Owens performed a Fisherman's Buster on Zayn through a table for a nearfall. Zayn performed a Helluva Kick on Owens for a nearfall. Zayn retrieved a barbed-wire steel chair and used it against Owens. Zayn set up the chair on top of two others and performed a Blue Thunderbomb on Owens through it for a nearfall. Owens performed multiple apron Powerbombs on Zayn to win the match. After the match, Owens exposed the concrete and attempted further damage to Zayn when a returning Randy Orton appeared and performed an RKO on Owens. Orton then attempted a Punt Kick, but was held back by security while Owens retreated. Orton then performed RKOs on four security guards.

=== Main event ===
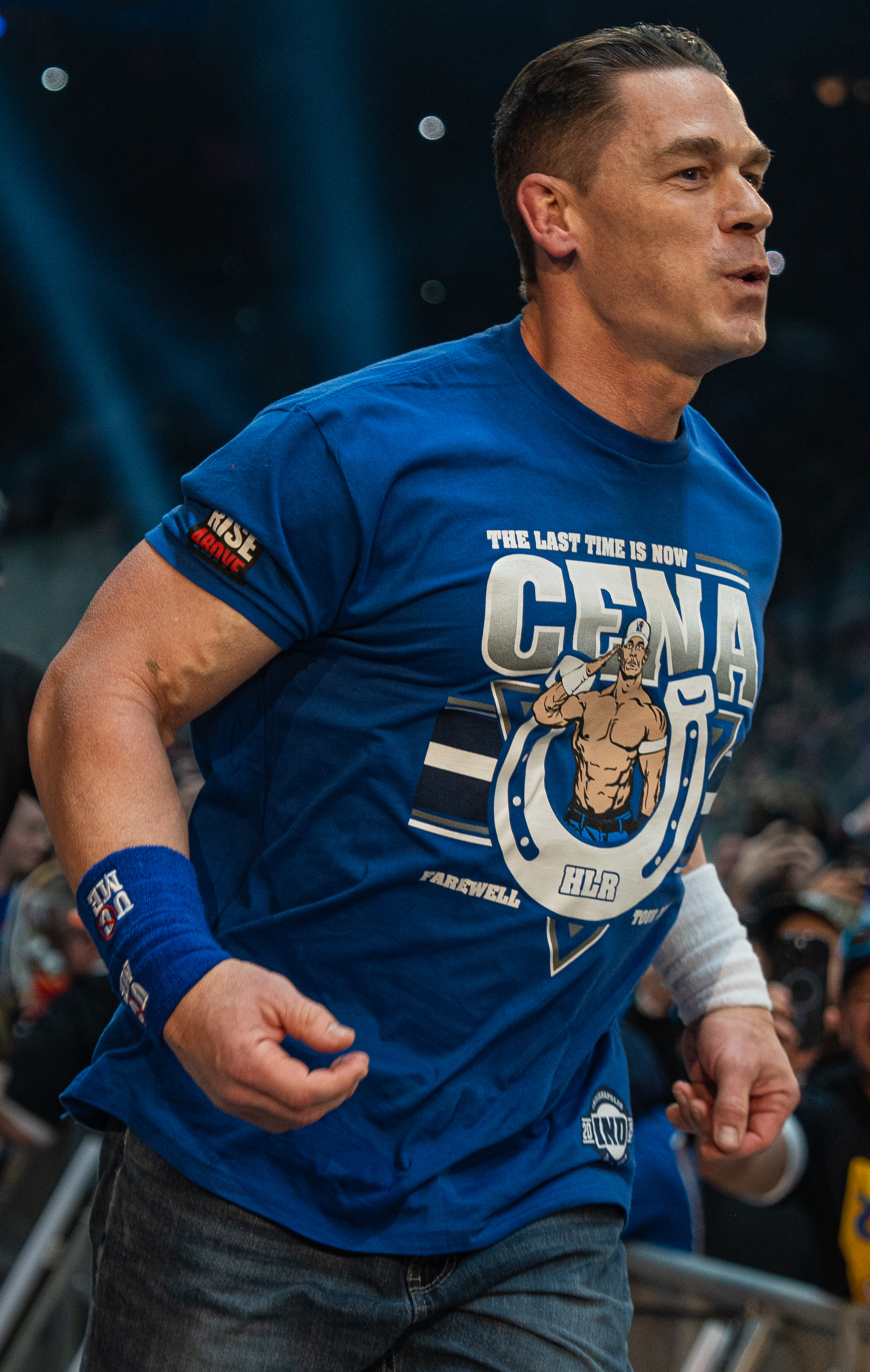
John Cena won the Men's Elimination Chamber match for a record-tying fourth time; (Note: Cena is tied with Triple H for the most Elimination Chamber match wins.) he then turned heel after the match, portraying a villain for the first time in 22 years.

The main event was the men's Elimination Chamber match to determine Cody Rhodes's challenger for the Undisputed WWE Championship at WrestleMania 41. Drew McIntyre and Seth "Freakin" Rollins began the match. McIntyre dominated Rollins, including sending him throat first into the exposed part of a turnbuckle. Damian Priest entered third, followed by Logan Paul. After Priest dominated, Paul performed a lucky punch on Priest and slammed him to the floor. Rollins performed a superkick on Paul for a nearfall. John Cena entered fifth and performed his signature moves on his opponents. McIntyre performed a Claymore Kick on Cena before Priest pinned him with a rollup. McIntyre performed a Claymore Kick on Priest before leaving. Paul performed a Frog Splash on Priest to eliminate him before CM Punk entered last. Cena had a staredown with Punk before brawling with Rollins. Paul took out both men and Punk performed the GTS on Paul to eliminate him. Cena and Punk performed a Hart Attack on Rollins. Cena offered a handshake, and he and Punk hugged it out. They began brawling with Cena getting the upper hand with his signature moves. They then traded submissions before Punk took out Rollins outside the ring. Cena countered a crossbody into an Attitude Adjustment for a nearfall. Rollins sent Cena through a chamber pod before turning his attention to Punk. After they traded finishers, Rollins was eliminated after a GTS by Punk and an Attitude Adjustment by Cena. Cena performed an Attitude Adjustment and Punk performed a GTS on Cena, with both resulting in nearfalls. In the end, Rollins performed a Stomp on Punk, allowing Cena to apply the STF on Punk, who passed out, to earn an Undisputed WWE Championship match at WrestleMania 41.

After the match, Rhodes appeared and had a staredown with Cena. The Rock (accompanied by rapper Travis Scott) then appeared, joining Rhodes and Cena in the ring. Rock demanded Rhodes's soul, to which Rhodes responded by declining and telling Rock to "go fuck yourself". Afterwards Rock signaled to Cena with a throat-slashing gesture while Cena was hugging Rhodes, and Cena hit Rhodes with a low blow, turning heel for the first time since 2003. Cena would then proceed to viciously attack Rhodes with a Rolex watch Rock had gifted Rhodes in an attempt to bribe him, a microphone, and the Undisputed WWE Championship belt, causing him to bleed. Cena would then rip Rhodes's shirt off and pin him to the floor while Rock whipped Rhodes with his weight belt and Scott slapping him. Cena then stood tall with the title belt before leaving the ring with Rock and Scott as the show went off the air.

== Reception ==
The event was the highest-grossing WWE event ever held in Canada.

Writing for the Wrestling Observer Newsletter, wrestling journalist Dave Meltzer rated the Women's and Men's Elimination Chamber matches at 4.5 stars and 4.75 stars respectively, the tag team match at 2.75 stars, and the Unsanctioned match at 5 stars (the highest rating of the night).

== Aftermath ==
=== Raw ===
CM Punk opened the following episode of Raw, where he addressed The Rock, John Cena, and Seth "Freakin" Rollins. Rollins came out and he and Punk engaged in a brawl. Later, Raw General Manager Adam Pearce scheduled a Steel Cage match between Punk and Rollins for the following week, which Rollins won thanks to the return of Roman Reigns who pulled him out of the cage in order to attack Rollins as revenge from the Royal Rumble match. Following the match, Reigns noticed Paul Heyman tending to Punk in the ring, which enraged Reigns, causing him to also attack Punk. On March 21, Punk, Reigns, and Rollins were scheduled for a triple threat match at WrestleMania 41.

Also on the following Raw, Iyo Sky defeated Rhea Ripley to win the Women's World Championship, confirming that women's Elimination Chamber match winner Bianca Belair would challenge Sky for the title at WrestleMania 41.

=== SmackDown ===
Randy Orton opened the following episode of SmackDown, recapping the problems he had with Kevin Owens and why he attacked him at Elimination Chamber. On the March 21 episode, Orton challenged Owens to a match at WrestleMania 41 which was made official. However, on April 4, the match was canceled after it was announced that Owens had a neck injury that required surgery. Owens would eventually return from injury seventeen months later at SummerSlam.

Also on SmackDown, Drew McIntyre attacked Damian Priest on the backstage. Later that match, after McIntyre won his match, he was attacked by Priest, who vowed to keep targeting McIntyre. On April 10, they were scheduled for a match at WrestleMania 41, with a Sin City Street Fight stipulation subsequently being added to the match.

Cody Rhodes, suffering a legitimate black eye, talked about the fans always supporting him and promised to walk out of WrestleMania 41 with a win over John Cena.

Naomi confessed to being the one who attacked Jade Cargill, turning heel for the first time since 2016, and was later attacked by Cargill again after berating Bianca Belair and the SmackDown audience. After Naomi won her match on the April 4 episode, she was scheduled for a match against Cargill at WrestleMania 41.

=== Broadcasting changes ===
In continuing WWE's near worldwide transition to Netflix, this would be the final Elimination Chamber to air on SonyLIV in India before migrating to Netflix on April 1. This would also be the final Elimination Chamber to air on Disney+ in the Philippines before moving to Netflix on January 1, 2026. Throughout 2025, many of the select few countries that were still on the WWE Network due to pre-existing contracts gradually merged to Netflix with nearly all international markets on Netflix by January 1, 2026. Additionally, on August 6, 2025, WWE announced that ESPN's direct-to-consumer streaming service would assume the streaming rights of WWE's main roster PLEs in the United States. This was originally to begin with WrestleMania 42 in April 2026, but was pushed up to September 2025 with Wrestlepalooza. As such, this was the last Elimination Chamber to livestream on Peacock in the US.

== Results ==
No.	Results	Stipulations	Times
1	Bianca Belair defeated Alexa Bliss, Bayley, Liv Morgan, Naomi, and Roxanne Perez	Elimination Chamber match for a Women's World Championship match at WrestleMania 41	29:15
2	Tiffany Stratton and Trish Stratus defeated Nia Jax and Candice LeRae by pinfall	Tag team match	11:40
3	Kevin Owens defeated Sami Zayn by pinfall	Unsanctioned match	27:35
4	John Cena defeated CM Punk, Damian Priest, Drew McIntyre, Logan Paul, and Seth "Freakin" Rollins	Elimination Chamber match for an Undisputed WWE Championship match at WrestleMania 41	32:40

=== Women's Elimination Chamber match ===
Eliminated	Wrestler	Entered	Eliminated by	Method	Time
1	Naomi	1	Unable to compete	Attacked by Jade Cargill	3:23
2	Bayley	5	Liv Morgan	Pinfall	19:05
3	Roxanne Perez	4	Alexa Bliss	Pinfall	23:05
4	Alexa Bliss	6	Liv Morgan	Pinfall	25:35
5	Liv Morgan	2	Bianca Belair	Pinfall	29:15
Winner	Bianca Belair	3	—		29:15

=== Men's Elimination Chamber match ===
Eliminated	Wrestler	Entered	Eliminated by	Method	Time
1	Drew McIntyre	1	Damian Priest	Pinfall	13:10
2	Damian Priest	3	Logan Paul	Pinfall	14:25
3	Logan Paul	4	CM Punk	Pinfall	18:30
4	Seth "Freakin" Rollins	2	CM Punk	Pinfall	30:00
5	CM Punk	6	John Cena	Technical submission	32:40
Winner	John Cena	5	—		32:40

== See also ==
- WWE in Canada
- Professional wrestling in Canada
