= Survivor Series: WarGames (2024) =

WWE premium live event

- Promotional poster featuring the former and current members of The Bloodline
- Promotion: WWE
- Brand(s): Raw; SmackDown
- Date: November 30, 2024
- City: Vancouver, British Columbia, Canada
- Venue: Rogers Arena
- Attendance: 17,828

WWE event chronology
← Previous; Crown Jewel	Next → NXT Deadline

Survivor Series chronology
← Previous; 2023	Next → 2025

WWE in Canada chronology
← Previous; Heatwave	Next → Elimination Chamber

The 2024 Survivor Series: WarGames was a professional wrestling premium live event (PLE) produced by the American company WWE, held for wrestlers from the promotion's main roster brands, Raw and SmackDown. It was the 38th annual Survivor Series, and the third annual branded as "WarGames", and it took place on Saturday, November 30, 2024, at the Rogers Arena in Vancouver, British Columbia, Canada. The event centered on the WarGames match, a type of roofless steel cage match that surrounds two rings placed side by side and is contested by teams of multiple wrestlers; the first team to score a pinfall or submission wins while escaping the cage is a forfeit.

This was the first Survivor Series to take place in Vancouver and WWE's first pay-per-view event held in the city and venue since Rock Bottom: In Your House in 1998. It was subsequently the third Survivor Series event held in Canada, after 1997 in Montreal and 2016 in Toronto. This was also WWE's final main roster PLE to air on Disney+ Hotstar in Indonesia, Binge in Australia, and the standalone WWE Network in most other international markets due to WWE's content in those areas moving to Netflix in January 2025, as well as the last Survivor Series to air on SonyLIV in India and Peacock in the United States, as India moved to Netflix in April 2025 and ESPN's direct-to-consumer streaming service assumed the streaming rights to the main roster PLEs in the US beginning in September 2025. This was also the first Survivor Series to air on Netflix in Brazil, Chile, Spain, and New Zealand.

Five matches were contested at the event, including two WarGames matches. In the main event, which was a men's WarGames match and was the main match from SmackDown but had involvement from Raw wrestlers, Roman Reigns, The Usos (Jey Uso and Jimmy Uso), Sami Zayn, and CM Punk defeated The Bloodline (Solo Sikoa, Jacob Fatu, Tama Tonga, and Tonga Loa) and Bronson Reed. For the women's WarGames match, which was the opening bout and was the main match from Raw but had involvement from SmackDown wrestlers, Rhea Ripley, Bianca Belair, Naomi, Iyo Sky, and Bayley) defeated The Judgment Day (Liv Morgan and Raquel Rodriguez), Nia Jax, Tiffany Stratton, and Candice LeRae.

== Production ==
=== Background ===
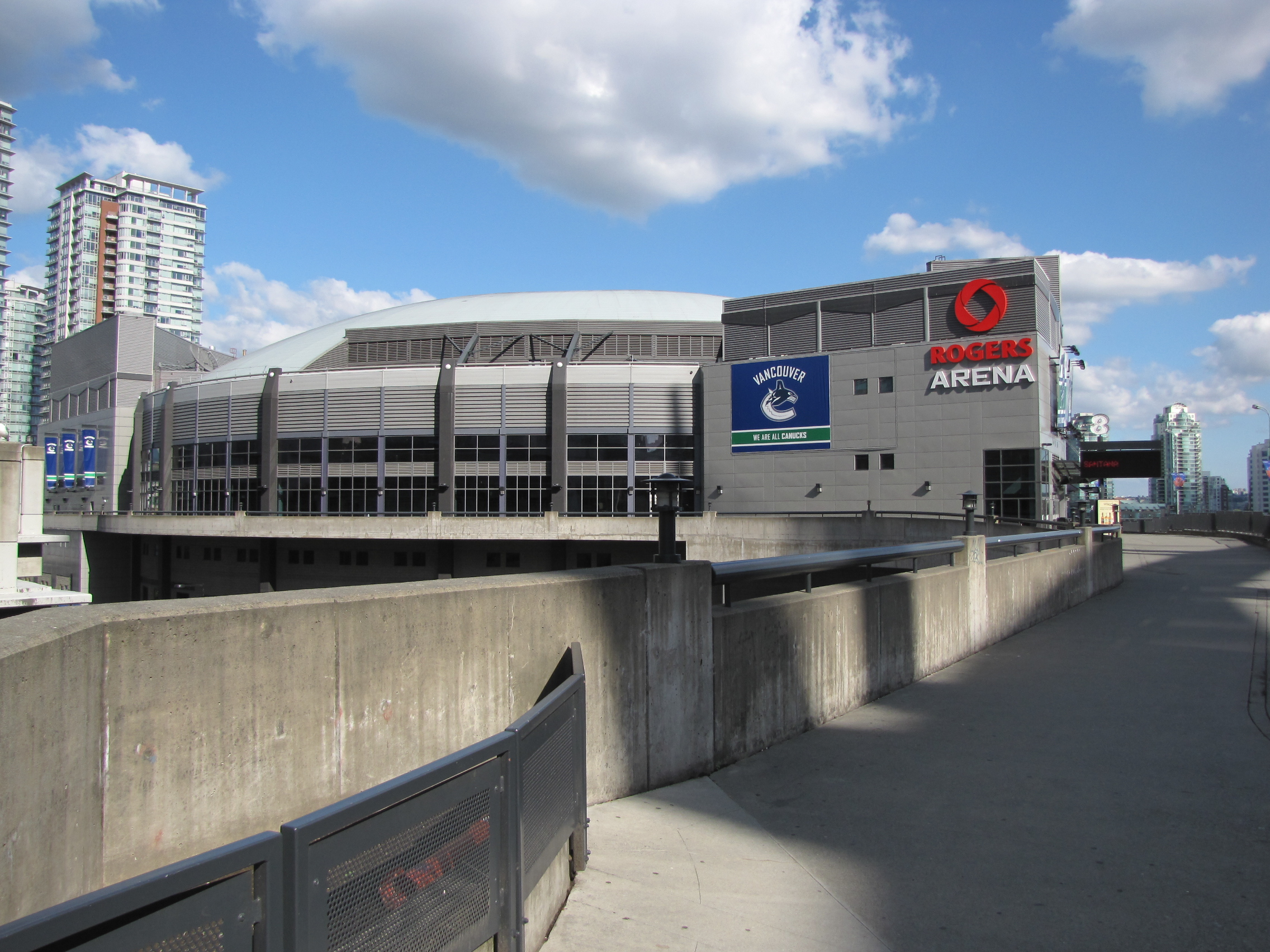
The 38th annual Survivor Series was held at the Rogers Arena in Vancouver, British Columbia, Canada, which was WWE's first pay-per-view event in the city since Rock Bottom: In Your House in 1998.

Survivor Series is an annual professional wrestling premium live event (PLE), produced every November by the American promotion WWE since 1987, generally held around Thanksgiving in the United States. It was originally broadcast exclusively via pay-per-view (PPV) before it began simulcasting on WWE's livestreaming platforms in 2014. In what has become the second longest-running PPV event in history (behind WWE's WrestleMania), it is one of the promotion's original four PPVs, along with WrestleMania, SummerSlam, and Royal Rumble, referred to as the "Big Four", and as of August 2021, it is considered one of the "Big Five", along with Money in the Bank.

From its inception in 1987 until 2021, the event was characterized by having Survivor Series matches, which were tag team elimination matches that typically featured teams of four or five wrestlers against each other. Since 2022, the event has been based around the WarGames match with the event rebranded as "Survivor Series: WarGames". The WarGames match is a type of roofless steel cage match that surrounds two rings placed side by side. It is contested by two or three teams composed of three to six members each. One member from each team starts in the cage, and every couple of minutes, another team member enters in a staggered format until all participants have entered. Once all participants are in the cage, the match officially begins and the first team to score a pinfall or submission wins, while escaping the cage is a forfeit.

On August 1, 2024, WWE Chief Content Officer Paul "Triple H" Levesque announced that the 38th Survivor Series, and third annual as WarGames, would be held on Saturday, November 30, 2024, at the Rogers Arena in Vancouver, British Columbia, Canada and feature wrestlers from the Raw and SmackDown brand divisions. This was the third Survivor Series to take place in Canada, after 1997 and 2016, but the first to be held in Vancouver as the prior two were in Montreal and Toronto, respectively. It was also WWE's first PPV event in the city since Rock Bottom: In Your House in 1998, which was held at the same venue when it was known as General Motors Place.

=== Broadcast outlets ===
Survivor Series: WarGames was broadcast live on traditional PPV worldwide. It was also available to livestream on Peacock in the United States, SonyLIV in India, Disney+ Hotstar in Indonesia, Disney+ in the Philippines, Binge in Australia, Abema in Japan, Netflix in Brazil, Chile, Spain, and New Zealand, and the WWE Network everywhere else—including the Canadian version, distributed by venue sponsor Rogers Communications. This was the first Survivor Series to air on Netflix in those specified countries, which moved to the platform on November 1.

Following an announcement made on January 23, this was the final Survivor Series, as well as WWE's final main roster PLE, to air on the standalone WWE Network in most international markets where it was still available, as well as Disney+ Hotstar and Binge, as its content moved to Netflix in January 2025; a select few territories maintained the standalone WWE Network until early 2026 due to pre-existing contracts before they also merged under Netflix when those contracts expired.

=== Storylines ===
The event included five matches that resulted from scripted storylines. Results were predetermined by WWE's writers on the Raw and SmackDown brands, while storylines were produced on WWE's weekly television shows, Monday Night Raw and Friday Night SmackDown.

From 2021 until 2023, Roman Reigns and his cousins The Usos (Jey Uso and Jimmy Uso) led The Bloodline stable, managed by Paul Heyman, holding both the Undisputed WWE Universal Championship and Undisputed WWE Tag Team Championships, respectively, until their respective losses at WrestleMania 39 and WrestleMania XL. Also during this time, Sami Zayn joined as an honorary member until January 2023, with The Usos's younger brother Solo Sikoa also joining. After an internal strife, The Usos left the group and emerged victorious during the Bloodline Civil War tag team match at the 2023 Money in the Bank; however, The Usos split up, with Jey moving to Raw and Jimmy remaining on SmackDown and rejoined The Bloodline, but despite being on different brands, this led to a match at WrestleMania XL where Jey defeated Jimmy. Reigns also lost the Undisputed WWE Universal Championship to Cody Rhodes at the event. In the months after Reigns's defeat, Sikoa assumed leadership of The Bloodline while forcibly exiling Jimmy and Heyman, and excommunicating Reigns, subsequently adding The Tongans (Tama Tonga and Tonga Loa) and Jacob Fatu. Reigns returned at SummerSlam, beginning a rivalry with Sikoa, while Jimmy returned at Bad Blood, which led to a reunion of Reigns and The Usos. At Crown Jewel, Reigns and The Usos lost to Sikoa, Fatu, and Tama after interference from Loa, with Sikoa pinning Reigns. Following the match, Sikoa's Bloodline outnumbered Reigns and The Usos until Raw's Zayn came out to save them, however, Zayn accidentally performed a Helluva Kick on Reigns intended for Sikoa. On the following Raw, Zayn was confronted by The Usos, with Jimmy claiming Zayn attacked Reigns on purpose. Jey then urged Zayn to appear on that week's SmackDown to make amends with Reigns. On SmackDown, Zayn told Reigns that the kick was an accident and stated it felt good to team with Reigns and The Usos again, however, he would only reunite with them against Sikoa's Bloodline if Reigns apologized to Jey for his past mistreatment of him, but Reigns refused. Later that night, Reigns confronted Sikoa and his Bloodline with Sikoa challenging Reigns and a team of his choosing to a WarGames match at Survivor Series: WarGames. Sikoa then introduced Zayn as the fifth member of his team, however, Zayn attacked Sikoa with Reigns acknowledging Zayn, officially reuniting the original iteration of The Bloodline (Reigns, The Usos, and Zayn). It was then announced that they would face the new Bloodline in a WarGames match at the event with a fifth member of each team to be determined. On the November 15 episode of SmackDown, Sikoa's Bloodline recruited Bronson Reed from Raw, while the following week, Heyman returned and revealed his old client, CM Punk from Raw, as the original Bloodline's fifth member. On the November 29 episode of SmackDown, Punk explained that he joined Reigns's team to get revenge for what Sikoa's Bloodline did to Heyman and that Heyman owed him a favor for agreeing to the match. Later that night, Fatu defeated Jey to earn the WarGames advantage.

At SummerSlam, Gunther defeated Damian Priest to win the World Heavyweight Championship. Three months later on the November 4 episode of Raw, Priest won a fatal four-way match to earn a rematch for the title, which was confirmed for Survivor Series: WarGames.

At Bad Blood, Liv Morgan defended Raw's Women's World Championship against Rhea Ripley, which Ripley won by disqualification after being attacked by the returning Raquel Rodriguez—Morgan retained since championships do not change hands by disqualification or countout unless stipulated. Rodriguez subsequently became a member of The Judgment Day alongside Morgan. On the October 29 episode of NXT, Ripley was attacked by Morgan and Rodriguez in the WWE Performance Center parking lot, suffering an orbital bone injury, taking her out of action indefinitely. At Crown Jewel on November 2, Morgan defeated SmackDown's WWE Women's Champion Nia Jax to win the inaugural WWE Women's Crown Jewel Championship after interference from Rodriguez and "Dirty" Dominik Mysterio. On the following episode of Raw, Morgan, Rodriguez, and Mysterio celebrated her victory before being interrupted by WWE Women's Tag Team Champions Bianca Belair and Jade Cargill and a brawl ensued between the two teams. Later that night, a battle royal took place to determine Morgan's next challenger, during which, Morgan and Rodriguez eliminated Belair and Cargill despite not being involved in the match, which was ultimately won by Iyo Sky. Belair and Cargill then defeated Morgan and Rodriguez on the next episode to retain their title. On that Friday's SmackDown, Morgan and Rodriguez attacked Belair and Cargill backstage during Jax's title defense against Naomi, which she ultimately won after interference from her allies, Tiffany Stratton and Candice LeRae. On the following episode of Raw, the team of Belair, Cargill, Naomi, and Sky confronted the team of Morgan, Rodriguez, Jax, Stratton, and LeRae before Ripley made a surprise return as the fifth member of Belair's team. Ripley declared WarGames and the two teams brawled with a WarGames match subsequently being scheduled for Survivor Series: WarGames. During the November 22 episode of SmackDown, Cargill was attacked backstage by an unknown assailant, taking her out of action indefinitely. Three days later on Raw, Belair defeated Jax after interference from Bayley to earn the WarGames advantage. Bayley was subsequently added to Belair's team as Cargill's replacement.

On the November 18 episode of Raw, Bron Breakker defended the Intercontinental Championship against Sheamus. During the match, Imperium's Ludwig Kaiser, who had been embroiled in a rivalry with Sheamus over the past few months, attacked Breakker, causing a disqualification win for Breakker to retain the title. The following week, Breakker faced Kaiser in a non-title match, which ended in a disqualification win for Kaiser after Sheamus attacked him. A brawl subsequently ensued between all three men. Raw General Manager Adam Pearce then scheduled Breakker to defend the title against both Sheamus and Kaiser in a triple threat match at Survivor Series: WarGames.

After LA Knight's successful defense of the United States Championship on the November 15 episode of SmackDown, he was attacked by a returning Shinsuke Nakamura, who would attack Knight once again the following week after another successful title defense. During the November 25 episode of Raw, it was announced that Knight would defend the title against Nakamura at Survivor Series: WarGames.

== Event ==
Other on-screen personnel
Role:	Name:
English commentators	Michael Cole
English commentators	Corey Graves
Spanish commentators	Marcelo Rodríguez
Spanish commentators	Jerry Soto
Ring announcer	Alicia Taylor
Referees	Shawn Bennett
Referees	Daphanie LaShaunn
Referees	Eddie Orengo
Referees	Charles Robinson
Referees	Ryan Tran
Referees	Rod Zapata
Interviewers	Cathy Kelley
Pre-show panel	Jackie Redmond
Pre-show panel	Wade Barrett
Pre-show panel	Big E
Pre-show panel	Peter Rosenberg

=== Preliminary matches ===
The first match was the Women's WarGames match in which the team of Rhea Ripley, Bianca Belair, Iyo Sky, Naomi, and Bayley faced the team of The Judgment Day (Liv Morgan and Raquel Rodriguez), Nia Jax, Tiffany Stratton, and Candice LeRae, with Ripley's team having the WarGames advantage. Jax and Bayley started the match. Naomi entered first followed by LeRae, Belair, Stratton, Sky, Rodriguez, Ripley, and finally Morgan. Jax hit a Samoan Drop on Bayley for a nearfall. Sky, with a trash can on her head, hit a Moonsault from the top of the right side of the cage while Stratton simultaneously performed a Swanton from the top of the left side of the cage. Belair and Naomi hit a Powerbomb on Jax through a table. Morgan hit the Oblivion on Bayley onto a chair for a nearfall. Morgan used a steel chair and hit a Codebreaker on Ripley. Morgan placed Ripley on a table and went to the ropes, but Ripley recovered and hit Morgan with a Riptide from the top rope through a table to win the match.

In the second match, LA Knight defended SmackDown's United States Championship against Shinsuke Nakamura. Knight performed a Diving Elbow Drop on Nakamura for a nearfall. Knight attempted the Blunt Force Trauma, but Nakamura rolled out to the diamond plate between the two rings where Nakamura gouged Knight's eyes and hit Knight with a reverse DDT, before rolling him into the ring and hitting Knight with a Kinshasa to win the title for the third time.

Next, Bron Breakker defended Raw's Intercontinental Championship against Sheamus and Ludwig Kaiser in a triple threat match. Throughout the match, Kaiser attacked Sheamus with a shillelagh, injuring Sheamus's ribs. Sheamus hit the High Cross on Breakker for a nearfall. Sheamus attempted a Brogue Kick, but could not connect due to his injured ribs. In the end, Breakker performed a Spear on Kaiser, driving him from the ring. Breakker then performed another Spear on Sheamus to retain the title.

In the penultimate match, Gunther defended Raw's World Heavyweight Championship against Damian Priest. Throughout the match, Gunther targeted Priest's injured shoulder. Priest locked Gunther in a triangle choke but Gunther was able to shift his weight into a pin attempt for a nearfall. Priest attempted to perform both the Razor's Edge and the South of Heaven Chokeslam, but was unable to do so as a result of the injured arm. Gunther locked Priest in a Kimura Lock but Priest was able to make it to the ropes to break the hold. In the end, Priest's former Judgment Day stablemate Finn Bálor appeared and hit a Coup de Grâce to Priest off the steel steps. Gunther then performed a Big Boot on Bálor before positioning Priest back in the ring, where he ultimately locked Priest in a modified Sleeper with Priest passing out, thus Gunther retained the title.

=== Main event ===
The main event was the Men's WarGames match in which the team of Roman Reigns, The Usos (Jimmy Uso and Jey Uso), Sami Zayn, and CM Punk faced the team of The Bloodline (Solo Sikoa, Tama Tonga, Tonga Loa, and Jacob Fatu) and Bronson Reed, with The Bloodline having the WarGames advantage. Jey and Tama started the match. Reed entered first followed by Jimmy and Fatu. As Punk tried to enter the match, Reigns blocked him and sent Zayn to the ring instead. Loa entered next and when Reigns tried to enter, Punk pushed Reigns out of the way and entered the match himself. Punk performed a Bulldog to Fatu on a toolbox but Fatu jumped right up and hit a Samoan Drop on Punk. Sikoa entered next as he and his team knocked down Reigns's team. Sikoa subsequently locked the cage in an attempt to prevent Reigns from entering. Reigns scaled the cage to enter the match to fight off his opponents. A brawl then ensued between both teams. As Reigns and Punk began to argue, Paul Heyman came out and pleaded with them to work together or they would lose. As Punk attempted a Go To Sleep on Loa, Reigns attempted a Spear on Sikoa but he moved and Reigns accidentally speared Punk. Sikoa hit a Samoan Spike on Reigns for a nearfall. Reed attempted a Tsunami to put Reigns through a table but Punk pulled Reigns out of the way as Reed crashed through the table. Reigns extended his hand and helped Punk back to his feet. Jimmy hit an Uso Splash off the top of the cage driving Fatu through a table. The team surrounded Sikoa where The Usos performed a Double Superkick on him followed by a Helluva Kick by Zayn. Punk hit Sikoa with the Go to Sleep and then Reigns hit Sikoa with a Spear and pinned him to win the match. Afterwards, Reigns and Punk shook hands. As they exited the cage, Punk embraced Heyman and told him that when he wanted the favor, he would come asking for it.

== Reception ==
Dave Meltzer of the Wrestling Observer Newsletter gave the Men's WarGames match and the Intercontinental Championship match 4.25 stars each. The Women's WarGames match received 3 stars, the United States Championship match received 2.25 stars, and the World Heavyweight Championship match received 3.75 stars.

== Aftermath ==
During the men's WarGames match, three wrestlers suffered injuries: Bronson Reed suffered a broken ankle, Tonga Loa suffered a torn bicep, and Jimmy Uso suffered a broken toe.

=== Raw ===
On the following episode of Raw, after Liv Morgan and Raquel Rodriguez defeated Iyo Sky and Kairi Sane, they attacked Sky. However, Rhea Ripley made the save and brawled with Rodriguez, which ended with Rodriguez shoving Ripley eye first into the corner of the announce table. The following week, Ripley defeated Rodriguez in an Anything Goes match. At Saturday Night's Main Event XXXVII, Morgan retained the Women's World Championship against Sky. On the December 16 episode of Raw, Ripley declared herself as the number one contender for Morgan's title, and the title match was subsequently scheduled for Raw's premiere on Netflix, where Rhea won the title, ending the feud.

Also on Raw, after World Heavyweight Champion Gunther defeated "Dirty" Dominik Mysterio, he was attacked by Finn Bálor with three Coup de Grâces. Bálor was then scheduled to face Gunther for the title at Saturday Night's Main Event XXXVII. The following week, Bálor claimed that he was the reason why Gunther retained the title several times. Gunther stated that he used to look up to Bálor before the latter joined The Judgment Day and played second fiddle to Damian Priest. The Judgment Day (Bálor, Carlito, JD McDonagh, and Mysterio) then took out Gunther and Priest. Priest was then added to the title match, where Gunther retained. On the December 16 episode of Raw, Priest cost Bálor and McDonagh the World Tag Team Championship. Two weeks later, Priest's team defeated The Judgment Day (Bálor, McDonagh, and Mysterio) in a six-man tag team match. They faced each other in a street fight on the January 13, 2025, episode, where Priest was victorious to end the feud.

In a backstage segment, Intercontinental Champion Bron Breakker mentioned that Sheamus sustained a cracked rib from Survivor Series: WarGames. Ludwig Kaiser interrupted, wanting to face Breakker for the title one-on-one. On the December 16 episode, Breakker defeated Kaiser to retain the title. Sheamus then returned two weeks later to attack Kaiser with a Brogue Kick. On the January 13, 2025, episode, Sheamus defeated Kaiser and confronted Breakker after the match. Afterwards, it was announced that Breakker would defend the Intercontinental Championship against Sheamus at Saturday Night's Main Event XXXVIII.

=== SmackDown ===
On the December 13 episode of SmackDown, Roman Reigns challenged Solo Sikoa for a Tribal Combat for the Ula Fala and recognition as Tribal Chief of the Anoaʻi family at Raw's premiere on Netflix on January 6, 2025, where Sikoa lost, thus ending the feud. The alliance with Reigns and Heyman would end at WrestleMania 41 Night 1 when Heyman turned on Reigns and aligned with Seth Rollins. However, Jacob Fatu left The Bloodline, which also added JC Mateo and Talla Tonga was renamed to MFT (My Family Tree) in July 2025.

LA Knight and Shinsuke Nakamura would continue feuding over the United States Championship, leading to two more title matches. The first occurred on the January 10, 2025, episode of SmackDown, which ended in a no-contest after interference from Tama Tonga and Jacob Fatu. The second occurred on the March 7 episode, where Knight reclaimed the title.

In the women's division, Bayley, Bianca Belair, and Naomi defeated Tiffany Stratton, Candice LeRae, and WWE Women's Champion Nia Jax in a six-woman tag team match on the December 27 episode of SmackDown. Naomi then faced Jax for the WWE Women's Championship the following week, where Stratton helped Jax retain the title. After the match, however, Stratton turned on Jax and cashed in her Money in the Bank contract to win the title. On the January 10, 2025, episode, Bayley defeated Naomi, Belair, and Jax in a fatal four-way match to become the number one contender for the title.

=== Broadcasting changes ===
In addition to the majority of countries moving to Netflix in January 2025, this would also be the final Survivor Series to air on SonyLIV in India following the expiration of WWE's contract with SonyLIV with India then moving to Netflix in April 2025. Additionally, on August 6, 2025, WWE announced that ESPN's direct-to-consumer streaming service would assume the streaming rights of WWE's main roster PLEs in the United States. This was originally to begin with WrestleMania 42 in April 2026, but was pushed up to September 2025 with Wrestlepalooza. As such, this was the last Survivor Series to livestream on Peacock in the US.

== Results ==
Match Card
No.	Results	Stipulations	Times
1	Rhea Ripley, Bianca Belair, Naomi, Iyo Sky, and Bayley defeated The Judgment Day (Liv Morgan and Raquel Rodriguez), Nia Jax, Tiffany Stratton, and Candice LeRae by pinfall	Women's WarGames match	38:15
2	Shinsuke Nakamura defeated LA Knight (c) by pinfall	Singles match for the WWE United States Championship	9:45
3	Bron Breakker (c) defeated Sheamus and Ludwig Kaiser by pinfall	Triple threat match for the WWE Intercontinental Championship	14:25
4	Gunther (c) defeated Damian Priest by technical submission	Singles match for the World Heavyweight Championship	19:20
5	The OG Bloodline (Roman Reigns, The Usos (Jey Uso and Jimmy Uso) and Sami Zayn), and CM Punk (with Paul Heyman) defeated The New Bloodline (Solo Sikoa, Jacob Fatu, Tama Tonga, and Tonga Loa) and Bronson Reed by pinfall	Men's WarGames match	41:55
(c) / – the champion(s) heading into the match

== See also ==
- WWE in Canada
- Professional wrestling in Canada
