= Bianca Belair =

American professional wrestler

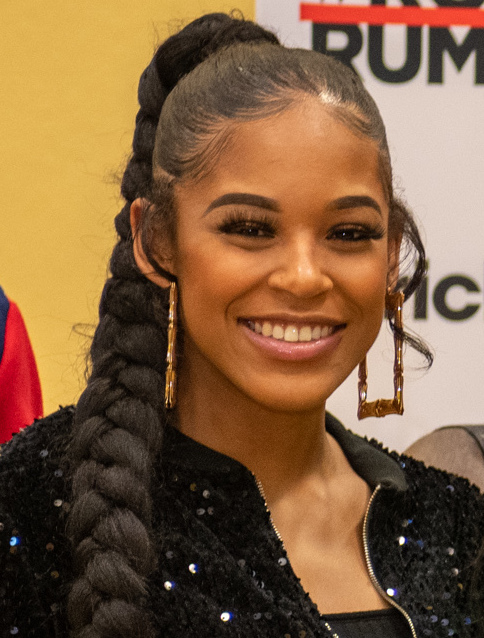
- Belair in 2023

Personal information
- Born: Bianca Nicole Blair; April 9, 1989 (age 37) Knoxville, Tennessee, U.S.
- Spouse: Montez Ford (m. 2018)
- Children: 1

Professional wrestling career
- Ring name(s): Bianca Belair; Bianca Blair; Binky Blair
- Billed height: 5 ft 7 in (170 cm)
- Billed from: Knoxville, Tennessee
- Trained by: Sara Del Rey; WWE Performance Center
- Debut: September 29, 2016

Bianca Nicole Crawford (née Blair; born April 9, 1989) is an American professional wrestler and fitness and figure competitor. As of April 2016, she is signed to WWE, where she performs on the SmackDown brand under the ring name Bianca Belair. Belair is one of two women to win at a WrestleMania main event and her 420-day reign as Raw Women's Champion (Note: The Raw Women's Championship was renamed as the WWE Women's Championship in June 2023. Belair's first reign was as the Raw Women's Champion.) stands as the longest in the championship's history.

Crawford made her professional wrestling debut in 2016 for WWE's developmental brand NXT, competing for the NXT Women's Championship on multiple occasions. After being drafted to SmackDown, she won the 2021 Women's Royal Rumble match, becoming the second African American after The Rock to win a Royal Rumble match. She successfully challenged for the SmackDown Women's Championship against Sasha Banks in the main event of WrestleMania 37 – Night 1, which marked the second time women main-evented WrestleMania, as well as the first time two African-Americans main-evented WWE's flagship event. In 2021, she was ranked No. 1 of the top 150 female wrestlers by Pro Wrestling Illustrated (PWI).

In 2023, she became the longest-reigning Raw Women's Champion with her reign of 420 days. This would also be the longest reign of any WWE women's championship since 2006, with WWE promoting her as the longest-reigning women's champion of the modern era. This reign also broke a couple of other records within WWE, including the longest-reigning African-American world champion (male or female) and the longest-reigning African-American for any singles championship. After winning the WWE Women's Tag Team Championship with Jade Cargill in May 2024, she became the ninth WWE Women's Triple Crown Champion.

== Early life ==
Bianca Nicole Blair was born on April 9, 1989, in Knoxville, Tennessee. Blair attended Austin-East Magnet High School in Knoxville, Tennessee, where she succeeded in many sports such as track. She was a track and field athlete who competed in the hurdles and had what ESPN writer Sean Hurd called "a volatile six-year track career" that saw her attend three universities. She first attended the University of South Carolina and then Texas A&M University, and later did not compete for a year, before going back home to Knoxville to complete her college career at the University of Tennessee, where she became All-SEC and All-American as well as being named to the SEC's academic honor roll in 2011 and 2012. Blair was also a CrossFit competitor and powerlifter, having appeared in RX magazine, Femme Rouge magazine, and CrossFit.com. Blair was forced to abandon her CrossFit career due to intercostal chondritis, also known as shifting rib syndrome, which she attributed to overtraining.

== Professional wrestling career ==
=== WWE (2016–present) ===
==== NXT (2016–2020) ====
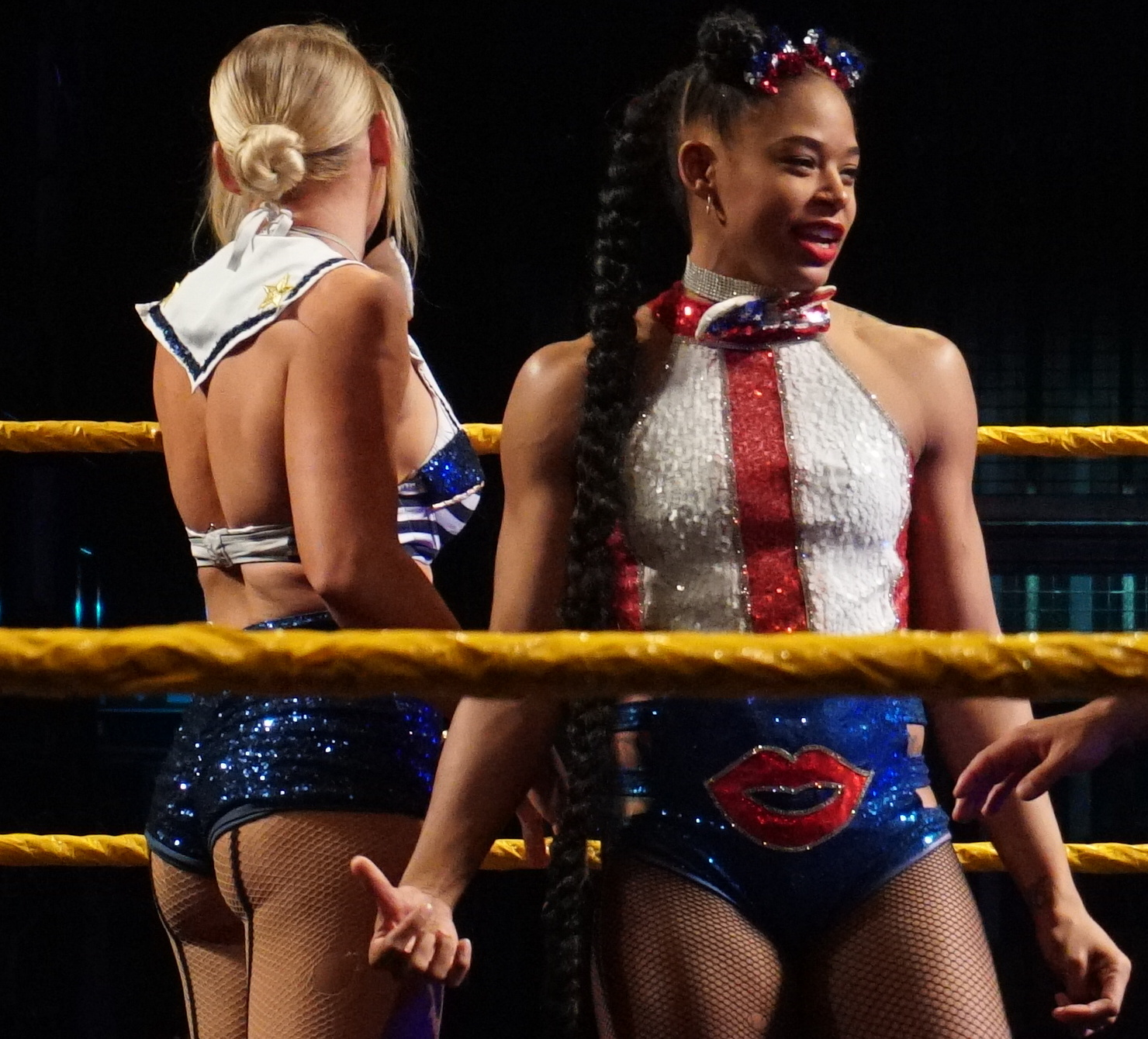
Belair (right) and Lacey Evans (left) before a tag team match at a house show in 2018

Blair entered her information into the WWE prospects database shortly after the premature end of her CrossFit career. Less than two weeks later, while working phone sales at a flavoring company in Atlanta, she received a message from Mark Henry, saying he could get her a tryout.

After two official tryouts, Blair signed a contract with WWE on April 12, 2016, and was assigned to the WWE Performance Center. Blair made her first appearance during an in–ring segment at an NXT live event on June 25 as Binky Blair, where she proclaimed to be the "EST of NXT... prettiest, baddest, strongest". She made her in–ring debut on September 29, losing to Aliyah. On the May 3, 2017, episode of NXT, Blair made her television debut under the ring name Bianca Belair, taking part in a battle royal to determine the number one contender for the NXT Women's Championship, but was eliminated by Billie Kay and Peyton Royce. Belair then participated in the 2017 Mae Young Classic, defeating Sage Beckett in the first round, but was eliminated in the second round by the eventual tournament winner Kairi Sane.

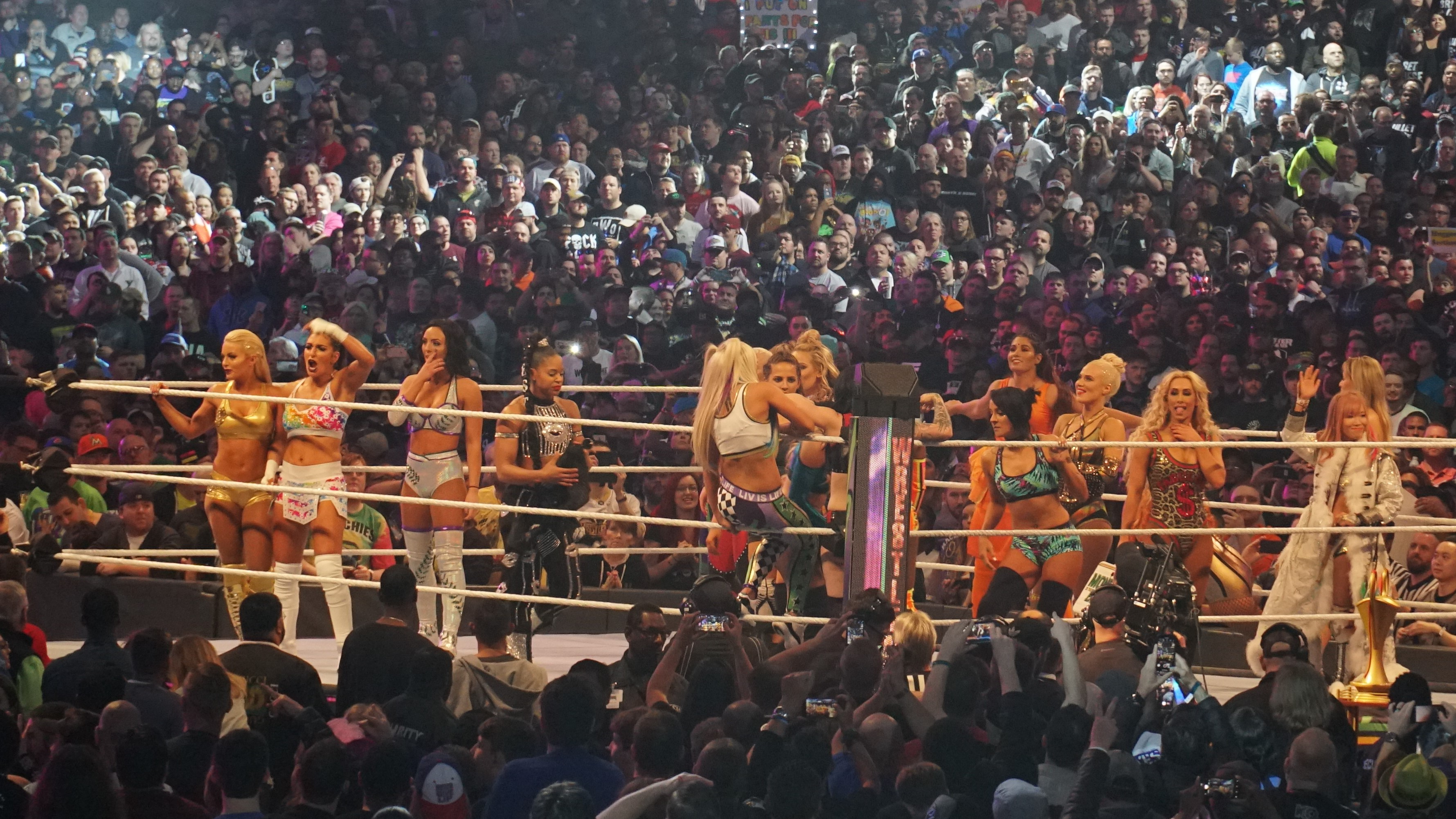
Belair (fourth from the left) at WrestleMania 34

In January 2018, Belair began an undefeated streak by defeating various competitors including Lacey Evans, Candice LeRae, Dakota Kai and Deonna Purrazzo. She made her WrestleMania debut by participating in the WrestleMania Women's Battle Royal at WrestleMania 34, but was eliminated by Becky Lynch.

In January 2019, At TakeOver: Phoenix, Belair unsuccessfully challenged Shayna Baszler for the NXT Women's Championship after interference from Jessamyn Duke and Marina Shafir, ending her undefeated streak at 367 days. At TakeOver: New York, Belair failed to win the title as she was submitted by Baszler in a fatal four-way match also involving Kairi Sane and Io Shirai. At WarGames, Belair and Team Baszler (NXT Women's Champion Shayna Baszler, Io Shirai, and NXT UK Women's Champion Kay Lee Ray) lost to Team Ripley (Rhea Ripley, Candice LeRae, Dakota Kai, and Tegan Nox) in the first ever women's WarGames match. The following night, she participated at Survivor Series, where the three brands (Raw, SmackDown, and NXT) faced each other in several matches; she was part of Team NXT, who defeated Team Raw and Team SmackDown in a 5-on-5-on-5 women's Survivor Series match.

In January 2020, at Royal Rumble, Belair entered her first women's Royal Rumble match at No. 2, eliminating a record 8 other superstars (tied with Baszler), before she was eliminated by eventual winner Charlotte Flair. At TakeOver: Portland, Belair faced Ripley for the NXT Women's Championship in a losing effort. On the February 26 episode of NXT, she competed in her final match in NXT, losing to Flair.

==== SmackDown Women's Champion (2020–2021) ====
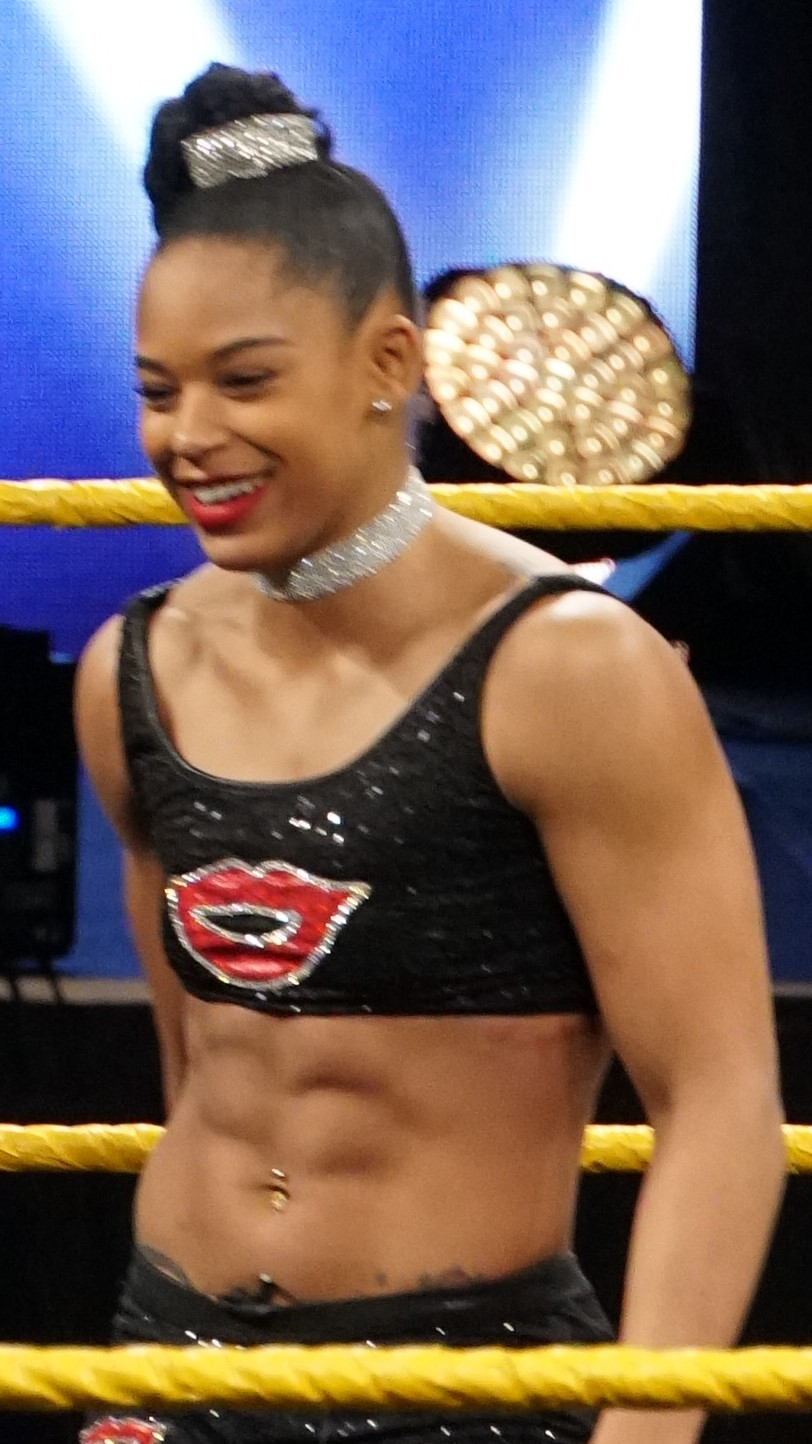
Belair in 2018

At WrestleMania 36, Belair made her main roster debut as a face by saving The Street Profits (Angelo Dawkins and Montez Ford) from Zelina Vega, Angel Garza, and Austin Theory, establishing herself as a member of the Raw roster. As part of the 2020 WWE Draft, Belair was drafted to the SmackDown brand. On the October 30 episode of SmackDown, she defeated Billie Kay and Natalya in a triple threat match to qualify for Team SmackDown at Survivor Series. At the event, she was eliminated by countout and her team lost the match to Team Raw.

In January 2021, at Royal Rumble, Belair won the Royal Rumble match by last eliminating Rhea Ripley, becoming the second-ever Black wrestler to achieve this feat in WWE history after The Rock. She was in the match for over 56 minutes, a record at the time for a participant in the Women's Royal Rumble match, having entered at No. 3. At Elimination Chamber, she and SmackDown Women's Champion Sasha Banks failed to win the WWE Women's Tag Team Championship from Shayna Baszler and Nia Jax. On the following episode of SmackDown, Belair officially challenged Banks to a title match at WrestleMania 37. They also failed to win the tag team titles at Fastlane. At the first night of WrestleMania, Belair defeated Banks in the main event to win the SmackDown Women's Championship. She then retained the title against Bayley at WrestleMania Backlash, and at Hell in a Cell, inside the namesake structure. Belair was scheduled to defend the title against Bayley in a "I Quit" match at Money in the Bank, but the match was cancelled due to Bayley suffering a torn ACL while training at the WWE Performance Center.

At SummerSlam, Belair was scheduled to defend her title against Sasha Banks, but during the event, it was announced that Banks could not compete. She was seemingly replaced by Carmella, who was attacked by a returning Becky Lynch, who challenged Belair for the title. Belair accepted and lost the title in a squash match, ending her reign at 133 days. She described the loss as one of the lowest points of her career, "losing the title in 26 seconds in front of all of your fans". At Extreme Rules, Belair defeated Lynch by disqualification due to interference by a returning Sasha Banks, thus not earning the title. As part of the 2021 WWE Draft, Belair was drafted to the Raw brand. At Crown Jewel, Belair failed to regain the title in a triple threat match against Lynch and Banks. At Survivor Series, Belair made history by becoming the first person to overcome a four-on-one handicap to win the event's traditional Survivor Series match.

==== Raw Women's Champion (2022–2023) ====
In 2022, at Elimination Chamber, Belair won the Elimination Chamber match to become the No. 1 contender for the Raw Women's Championship at WrestleMania 38, thus continuing her feud with Lynch. The rivalry between the two heightened and on the March 28 episode of Raw, Lynch appeared and attempted to cut Belair's hair with a pair of scissors in revenge for being scarred from a ponytail whip from Belair, however, she attacked Lynch with a Kiss of Death and chopped off her hair instead. At night one of WrestleMania 38, Belair defeated Lynch to win the Raw Women's Championship. Belair then retained the title against Asuka and Lynch in a triple threat match at Hell in a Cell, and against Carmella at Money in the Bank. At SummerSlam, Belair retained the title against Lynch, and after the match, they would embrace each other, ending their feud. However, they were confronted by the returning Bayley and her new allies Dakota Kai and Iyo Sky. On the August 8 episode of Raw, they challenged Belair, Alexa Bliss, and Asuka to a six-woman tag team match at Clash at the Castle, which they accepted. At the event, they lost to Damage CTRL when Bayley pinned her. At Extreme Rules, Belair retained the Raw Women's Championship against Bayley in a ladder match. On October 19, Belair reached 200 days as champion, making her the longest-reigning Black world champion in WWE history. At Crown Jewel, Belair retained the title against Bayley in a Last Woman Standing match. At Survivor Series: WarGames, Belair, Asuka, Bliss, Lynch, and Mia Yim defeated Damage CTRL (Bayley, Kai, Sky), Nikki Cross, and Rhea Ripley in a WarGames match.

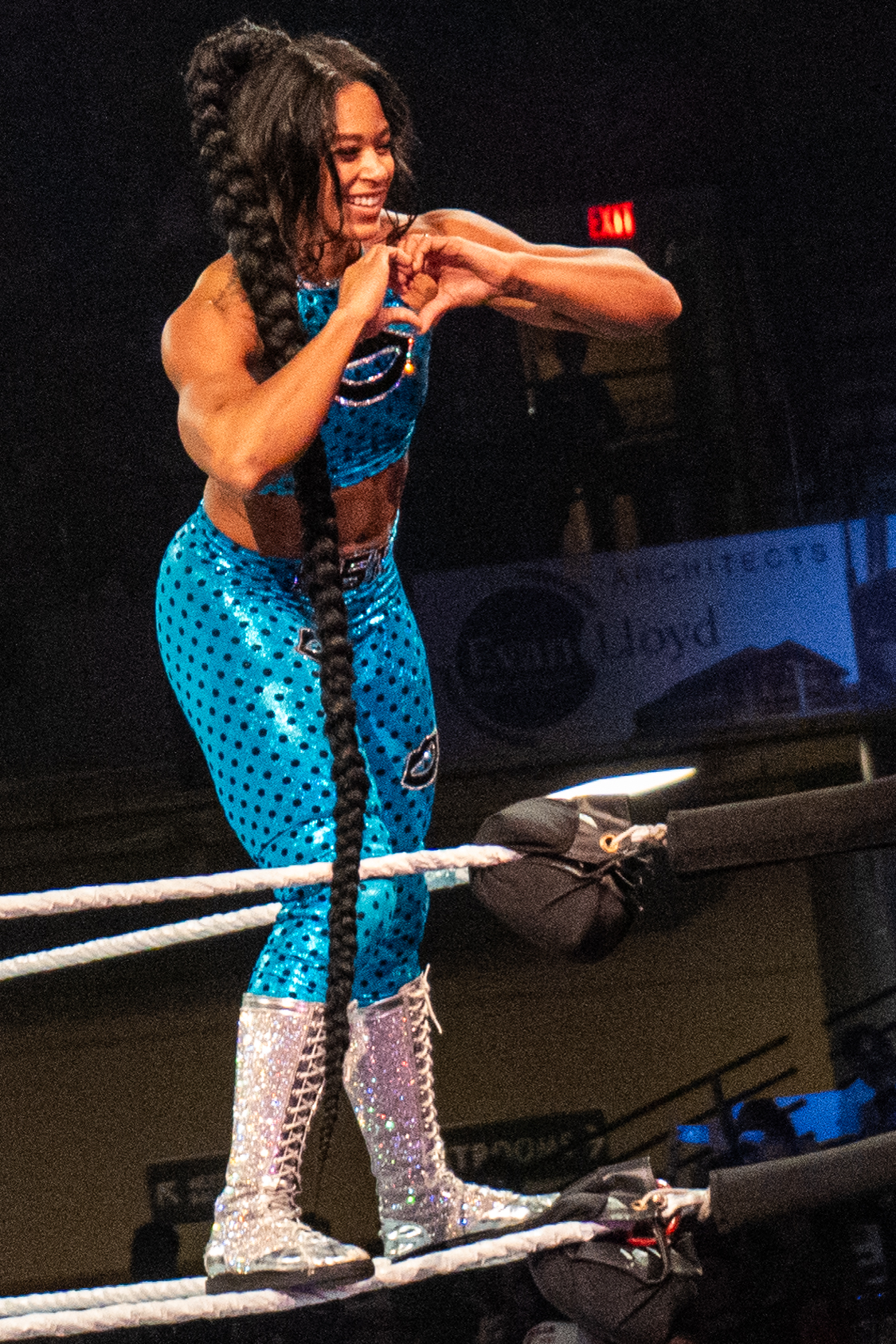
Belair in 2024

On the January 2, 2023 episode of Raw, Belair retained the title against Bliss by disqualification after Bliss attacked Belair and the referee. A rematch between the two was later scheduled for the Royal Rumble, where Belair retained the title against Bliss. At Night 2 of WrestleMania 39, Belair retained the title against Asuka. As part of the 2023 WWE Draft, Belair was drafted to the SmackDown brand along with the Raw Women's Championship. At Backlash, Belair retained the title against Iyo Sky. This win made Belair the longest-reigning Raw Women's Champion, surpassing Becky Lynch's reign of 398 days, subsequently being the longest reign of any WWE women's championship since Trish Stratus' reign with the original WWE Women's Championship in 2006, with WWE promoting Belair as the longest-reigning women's champion of the modern era. At Night of Champions, Belair lost the championship to Asuka, ending her first reign at a record-setting 420 days.

At SummerSlam, Belair regained the title by defeating Asuka and Charlotte Flair in a triple threat match to win her second WWE Women's Championship. However, she lost the title to Iyo Sky after Sky cashed-in her Money in the Bank contract, ending Belair's second reign in 1 minute and 35 seconds. This marks the title's shortest reign in history. After a two-month hiatus, Belair challenged Sky for the title at Crown Jewel but was unsuccessful due to interference by a returning Kairi Sane. At Survivor Series WarGames, Belair, Flair, Lynch and Shotzi defeated Damage CTRL (Bayley, Sky, Sane, and Asuka) in a WarGames match.

==== Triple Crown Champion and hiatus (2024–present) ====
In January 2024 at Royal Rumble, Belair entered the Royal Rumble match at number 10, eliminating TNA Knockouts World Champion Jordynne Grace in the process, before being eliminated by the winner, Bayley. She then took part in the women's Elimination Chamber match at the titular event, but was eliminated by Liv Morgan. At WrestleMania XL, the team of Belair, Jade Cargill, and Naomi defeated Damage CTRL.

In May 2024 at Backlash, Belair and Cargill defeated Damage CTRL's The Kabuki Warriors (Asuka and Sane) to win the WWE Women's Tag Team Championship. With this win, Belair became the ninth WWE Women's Triple Crown Champion. Belair then participated in the 2024 Queen of the Ring tournament, defeating Candice LeRae in the first round, and Tiffany Stratton in the quarterfinals. but lost to Nia Jax in the semifinals. At King and Queen of the Ring, Belair and Cargill defended their titles against Candice LeRae and Indi Hartwell. At Clash at the Castle, Cargill and Belair lost the titles to The Unholy Union (Alba Fyre and Isla Dawn) in a triple threat match, but regained the titles at Bash in Berlin. They then retained at Crown Jewel. At Survivor Series WarGames, Belair was a member of team Rhea Ripley which defeated team Liv Morgan in a WarGames match. After Cargill suffered an injury (kayfabe), Naomi volunteered to be Belair's new tag team partner. On the February 24 episode of Raw, Belair and Naomi lost the titles to The Judgment Day (Liv Morgan and Raquel Rodriguez) after interference from "Dirty" Dominik Mysterio, ending their reign at 73 days and Belair's individual reign at 177 days. Five days later at Elimination Chamber, Belair won the namesake match by last eliminating Morgan, becoming the first woman to win the Elimination Chamber match more than once and earning a Women's World Championship match at WrestleMania 41. At Night 2 of WrestleMania, Belair faced Iyo Sky for the Women's World Championship in a triple threat match also involving Rhea Ripley, which she lost after being pinned by Sky, thus ending her undefeated WrestleMania streak. Dave Meltzer of the Wrestling Observer Newsletter rated the match five stars, making it the first women's match in WWE history to achieve such a rating. On the April 25 episode of SmackDown, Belair revealed after the match at WrestleMania 41 that she had suffered broken fingers on her left hand and would be taking time off to heal. She appeared at Evolution, as the guest referee of the match between Cargill and Naomi. At WrestleMania 42 on April 18, 2026, Belair made another appearance to announce her pregnancy.

== Professional wrestling style and persona ==
Belair wrestles in a powerhouse style and is noted for her strength. She uses the nickname The EST of WWE (or NXT during her time there), which she describes as being "the fastest, the strongest, the quickest, the roughest and the toughest" – emphasis on the "est". She uses a torture rack into an argentine facebuster as her finisher, which she calls the Kiss of Death (often shortened as the K.O.D). Belair is known for her signature braided ponytail, which she often uses against her opponents as a weapon. She has also been known for making her own ring gear with a sewing machine and also making pre-match repairs with a makeshift sewing kit.

== Fitness and figure competition career ==
On December 4, 2022, Blair revealed that she would make her fitness and figure competition debut for World Beauty Fitness & Fashion (WBFF) at the Atlantic City ProAm. Two days later, Blair confirmed that she won the first place at Wellness, second place at Fitness, while also receiving a WBFF pro card.

== Other media ==
In late January 2020, WWE.com revealed Belair's first action figure debuting in Mattel's Basic Series 107. On August 25, 2022, Blair signed with Hollywood agency WME.

== Filmography ==
=== Television ===
Year	Title	Role	Notes
2022	Table for 3	Herself	1 episode
2024	Love & WWE: Bianca & Montez	Herself	Main cast
2024	WWE: Next Gen	Herself	Documentary
2024	Celebrity Family Feud	Herself	Episode: "Men of WWE vs. Women of WWE"
2024	Bel-Air	Herself	Episode: "Gimmie a Break"
2025	WWE Unreal	Herself	Documentary

=== Video games ===
Year	Title	Notes	Ref.
2018	WWE 2K19	Video game debut	
2019	WWE 2K20	—N/a	
2022	WWE 2K22	—N/a	
2023	WWE 2K23	—N/a	
2023	Fall Guys	Crossover WWE character (cosmetic)	
2023	Fortnite	Crossover WWE character	
2024	WWE 2K24	Deluxe Edition cover art	
2025	WWE 2K25	—N/a	
2026	WWE 2K26	—N/a	

== Personal life ==
Blair's father was in a band called the Blair Brothers and her brother played football. Her grandfather Edward G. High was a professor and chairman of biochemistry at Meharry Medical College, her great-grandfather Edward N. Toole was the first licensed African American electrician in Durham, North Carolina, and her aunt Miranda Hunt was one of the first African Americans to integrate St. Cecilia High School in Nashville, Tennessee.

Blair has been open about her struggles with an eating disorder, crediting a past track coach at Texas A&M University with helping her to prioritize her mental health and move onto recovery from the disorder.

On June 9, 2017, Blair announced that she was engaged to fellow professional wrestler Kenneth Crawford, better known as Montez Ford. The couple married on June 23, 2018. Blair is the stepmother of Crawford's two children from a previous relationship. During the first night of WrestleMania 42, Blair announced that she was expecting her first child with Crawford. On August 4, on her social media, she announced that she gave birth to her first child, who is a son.

== Championships and accomplishments ==
=== Fitness and figure competition ===
- World Beauty Fitness & Fashion
  - 1st place (Wellness Class; 2022)
  - 2nd place (Fitness Class; 2022)

=== Professional wrestling ===
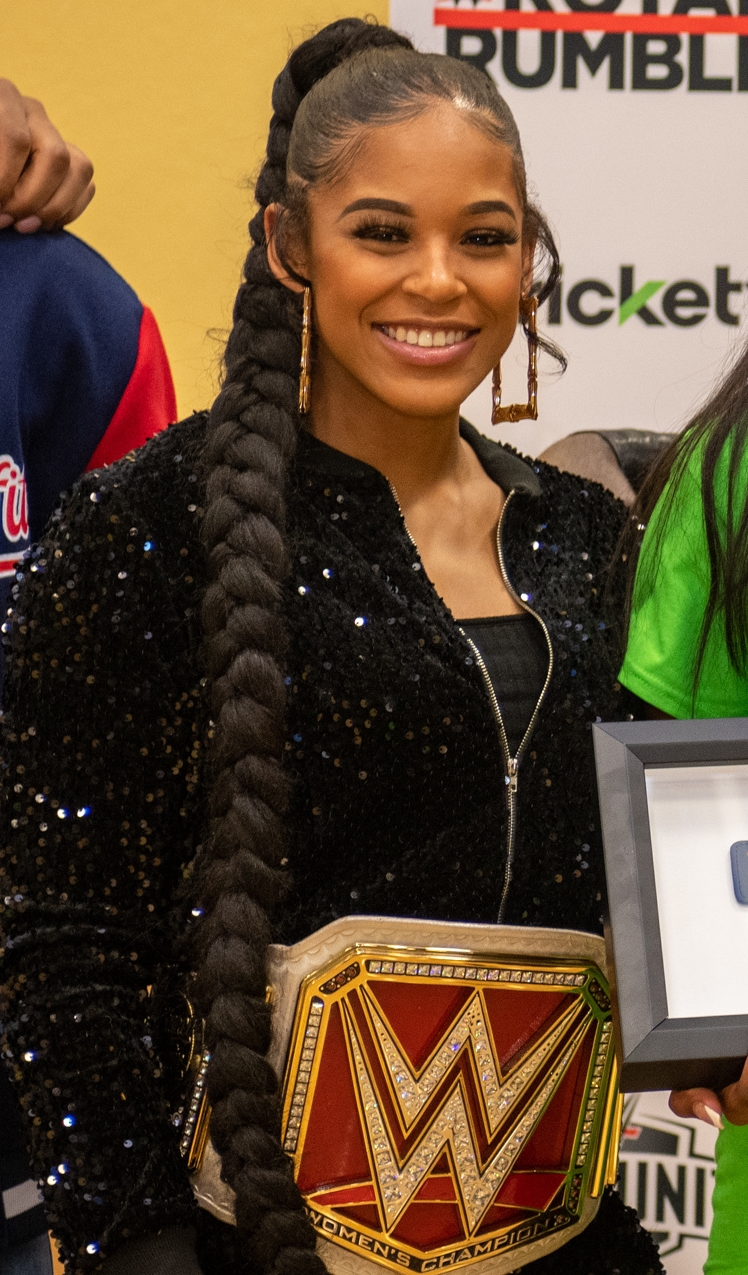
Belair is a two-time WWE Women's Champion...

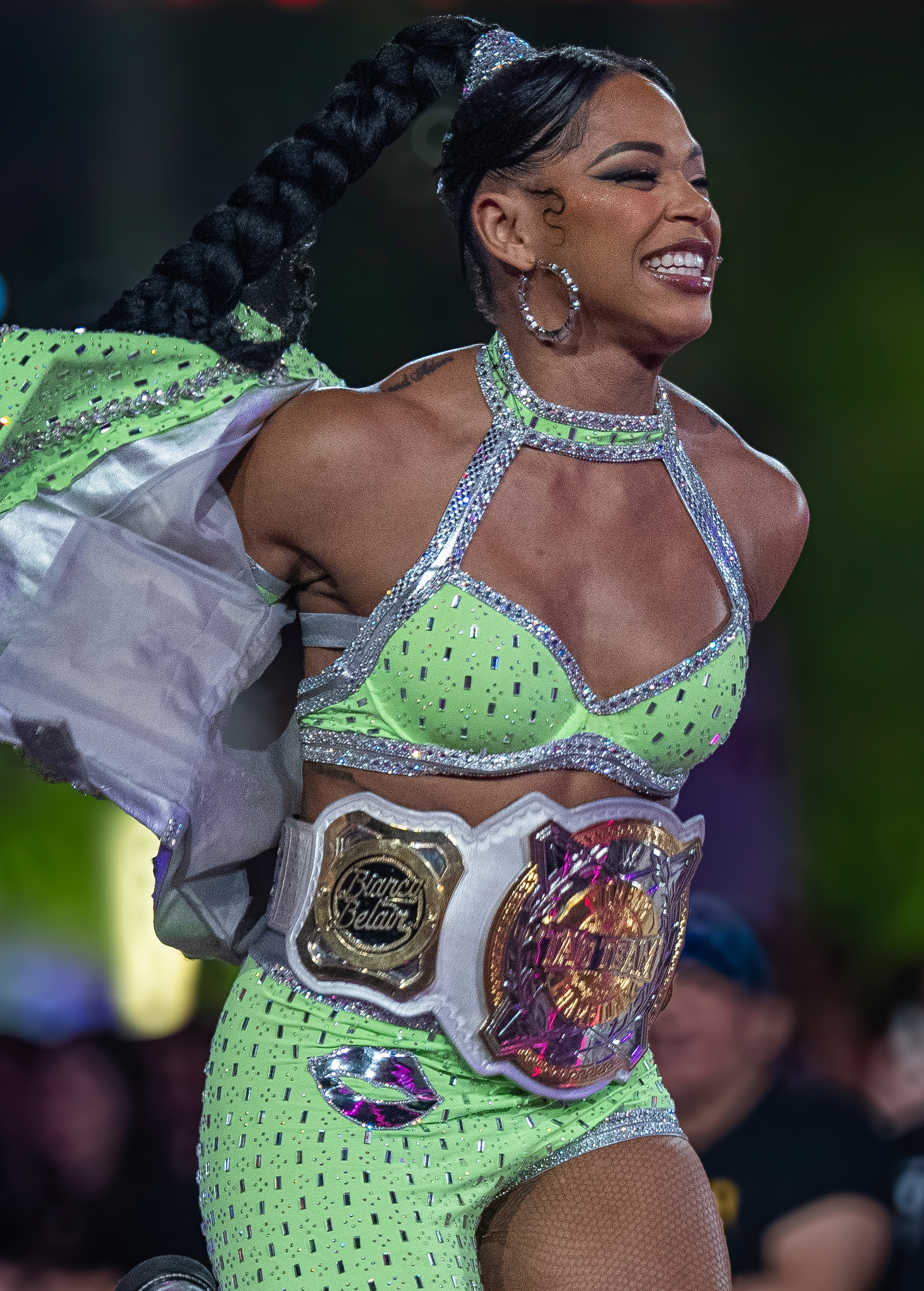
...and a two-time WWE Women's Tag Team Champion.

- ESPN
  - Best WWE Moment ESPY Award (2021) – Belair and Sasha Banks make history as the first Black women to main event WrestleMania
  - Female Wrestler of the Year (2022)
- New York Post
  - Female Wrestler of the Year (2022)
- Pro Wrestling Illustrated
  - Woman of the Year (2022)
  - Ranked No. 1 of the top 150 female wrestlers in the PWI Women's 150 in 2021
  - Ranked No. 1 of the top 100 tag teams in the PWI Tag Team 100 in 2024 – with Jade Cargill
  - Tag Team of the Year in 2024 – with Jade Cargill
- Slam Wrestling Awards
  - Best WWE Female (2022)
- Sports Illustrated
  - Match of the Year (2025) vs Iyo Sky vs Bianca Belair at WrestleMania 41
  - Ranked No. 9 in the top 10 women's wrestlers in 2018
  - Ranked No. 3 in the top 10 wrestlers in 2021 and 2022
- WWE
  - WWE Women's Championship (2 times)
  - WWE SmackDown Women's Championship (1 time)
  - WWE Women's Tag Team Championship (2 times) – with Jade Cargill (1), and Jade Cargill/Naomi (1) (Note: During Belair’s second reign, she originally won the title with Cargill but after Cargill got injured, she was replaced by Naomi. WWE recognizes this as a single uninterrupted reign.)
  - Women's Royal Rumble (2021)
  - Women's World's Collide Battle Royale (2019)
  - Ninth Women's Triple Crown Champion
  - Slammy Award
    - Tag Team of the Year (2025) – with Jade Cargill
  - Bumpy Award (1 time)
    - Best Match of the Half-Year (2021) – vs. Sasha Banks at WrestleMania 37

=== Track and Field ===
- All-American (NCAA Division I) (2011, 2012)
- All-SEC (2011, 2012)
- SEC Academic Honor Roll (2011, 2012)
