= Liv Morgan =

American professional wrestler (born 1994)

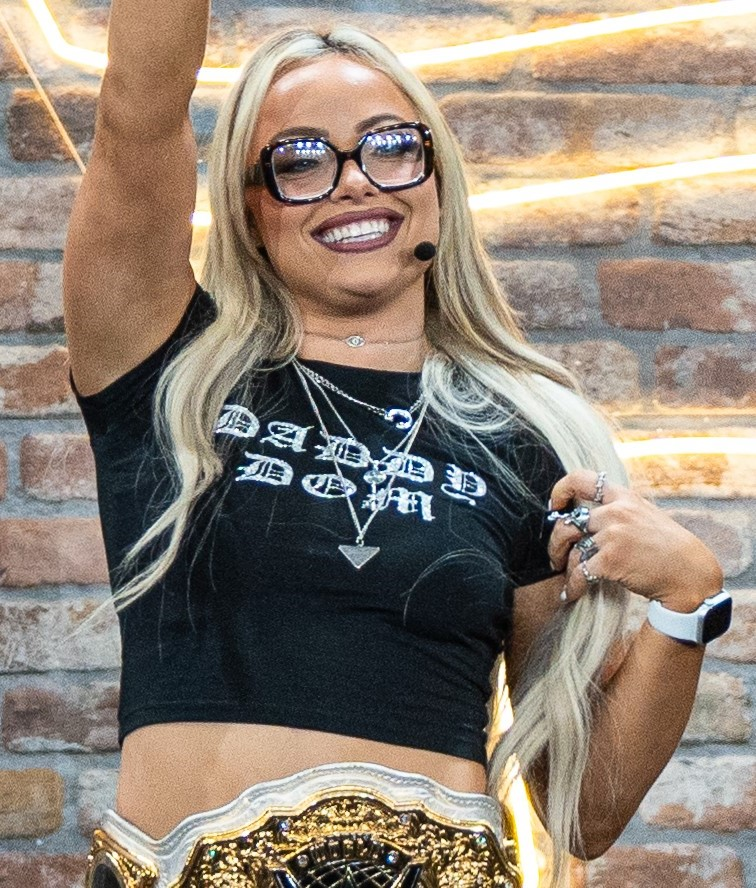
- Morgan in 2024

Personal information
- Born: Gionna Jene Daddio; June 8, 1994 (age 32) Morristown, New Jersey, U.S.

Professional wrestling career
- Ring name(s): Gionna Daddio; Liv Morgan; Marley
- Billed height: 5 ft 3 in (160 cm)
- Billed from: Elmwood Park, New Jersey
- Trained by: WWE Performance Center; Sara Amato
- Debut: June 27, 2015

Gionna Jene Daddio (born June 8, 1994) is an American professional wrestler and actress. She has been signed to WWE since October 2014, where she performs on the Raw brand under the ring name Liv Morgan. She is a member of The Judgment Day stable and the current Women's World Champion in her fourth reign.

In 2014, Daddio signed a contract with WWE and was assigned to the WWE Performance Center, later appearing in NXT (WWE's developmental brand) under the Liv Morgan ring name. She was promoted to the main roster in 2017 and was paired with Ruby Riott and Sarah Logan to form the stable The Riott Squad. After the stable disbanded in 2019, she became a singles competitor. After a few months of her singles run, she reunited with the returning Riott. They performed together until Riott's release in 2021. In 2022, Morgan won the Women's Money in the Bank ladder match and cashed in the same night, defeating Ronda Rousey to win the SmackDown Women's Championship, the first title in her wrestling career. In 2023, she formed a tag team with Raquel Rodriguez and they have since won the WWE Women's Tag Team Championship a record-setting four times as a tag team.

== Early life ==
Gionna Jene Daddio was born on June 8, 1994, in Morristown, New Jersey, and raised in Elmwood Park. She has four older brothers and a sister; following the death of Daddio's father, her mother raised all six children as a single mother. She dropped out of Becton Regional High School after being asked to repeat a grade; however, she went on to earn a GED diploma, and enrolled at Bergen Community College.

Daddio is a longtime fan of professional wrestling, and would participate in backyard wrestling with her siblings. She has described the matches as core to start her foray into wrestling:

I would literally take pedigrees and powerbombs like it was my job. I always pretended to be Lita. All the Divas were so glamorous and girly, and I was such a tomboy and didn't have nice clothes. When I saw Lita come out in baggy pants and sneakers, wrestling the boys, I thought she was the coolest thing ever. I related to her.

Daddio was a former competitive cheerleader, and worked and modelled for the restaurant chain Hooters. There, she met her former partner Eric Arndt, who got her in touch with a wrestling gym and WWE.

== Professional wrestling career ==
=== WWE ===
==== NXT (2014–2017) ====
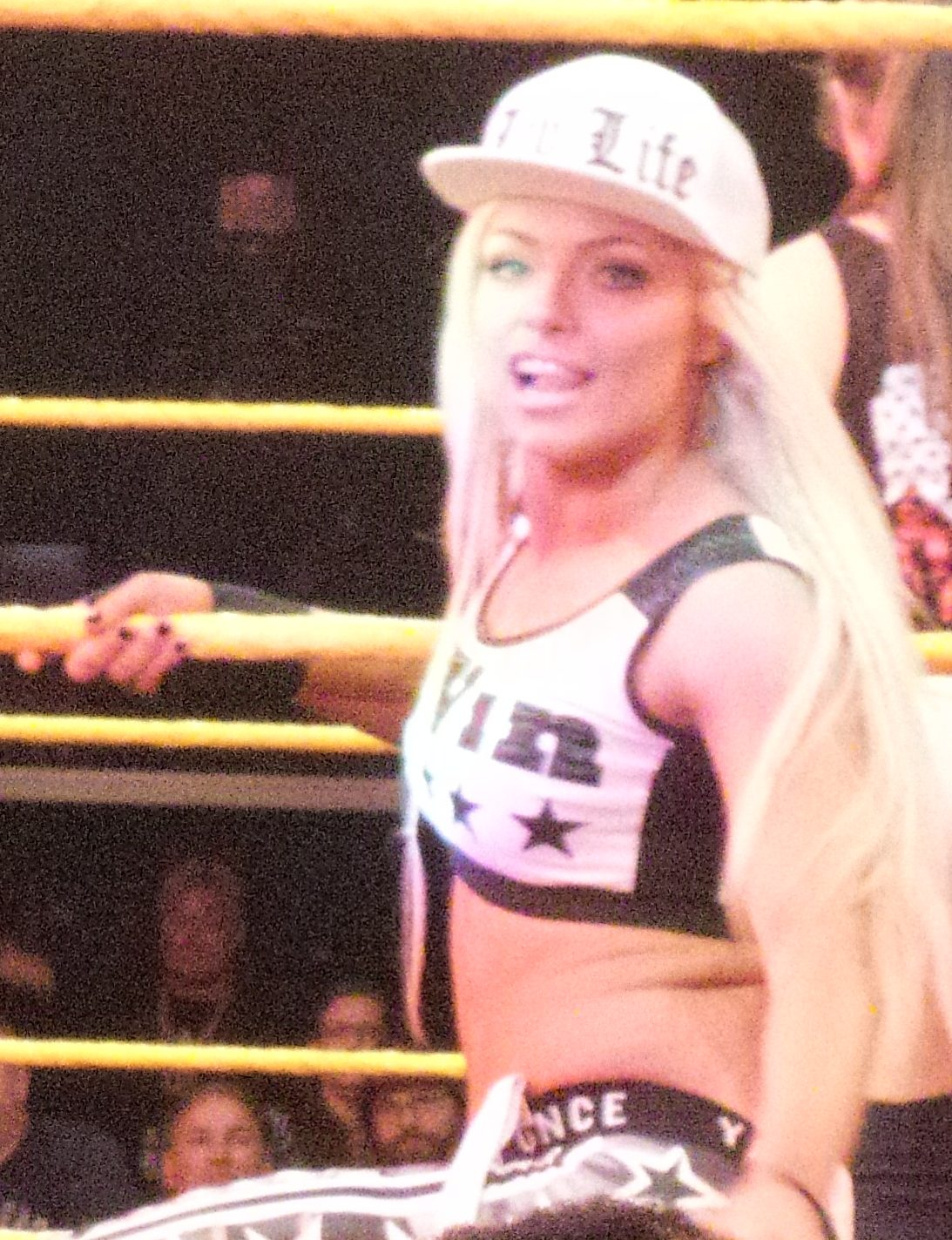
Morgan at an event in 2017

In 2014, after being discovered at Joe DeFranco's gym in Wyckoff, New Jersey, Daddio signed a contract with WWE, assigning her to their developmental territory, NXT in October 2014. She made her first televised appearance at the NXT TakeOver: Rival pay-per-view on February 11, 2015, as a planted fan who jumped on Tyler Breeze during his entrance. She appeared at NXT TakeOver: Unstoppable on May 20, again as part of Breeze's entrance. In October 2015, she began working as a face singles wrestler. Initially performing under the ring name "Marley", Daddio made her in-ring debut on the November 4 episode of NXT, where she worked as a jobber and lost to Eva Marie.

On the December 2 episode of NXT, Daddio made her return under the new ring name "Liv Morgan", losing to Emma. On the January 13, 2016, episode of NXT, Morgan competed in a battle royal to determine the number one contender to Bayley's NXT Women's Championship, which was won by Carmella. On the August 31 episode of NXT, Morgan picked up her first televised singles win, defeating Aliyah. She later began a rivalry with the Iconic Duo (Billie Kay and Peyton Royce), with both women confronting her following her match, leading to a match between Morgan and Kay two weeks later, which Kay won after interference by Royce. She then competed against Royce on the November 16 episode of NXT, which ended in a disqualification after Kay interfered in the match, attacking Morgan and Aliyah until Ember Moon made the save. The three faced off in a six-person tag team match against Kay, Royce, and Daria Berenato on the November 23 episode of NXT, with Morgan's team coming out victorious.

==== The Riott Squad (2017–2019) ====
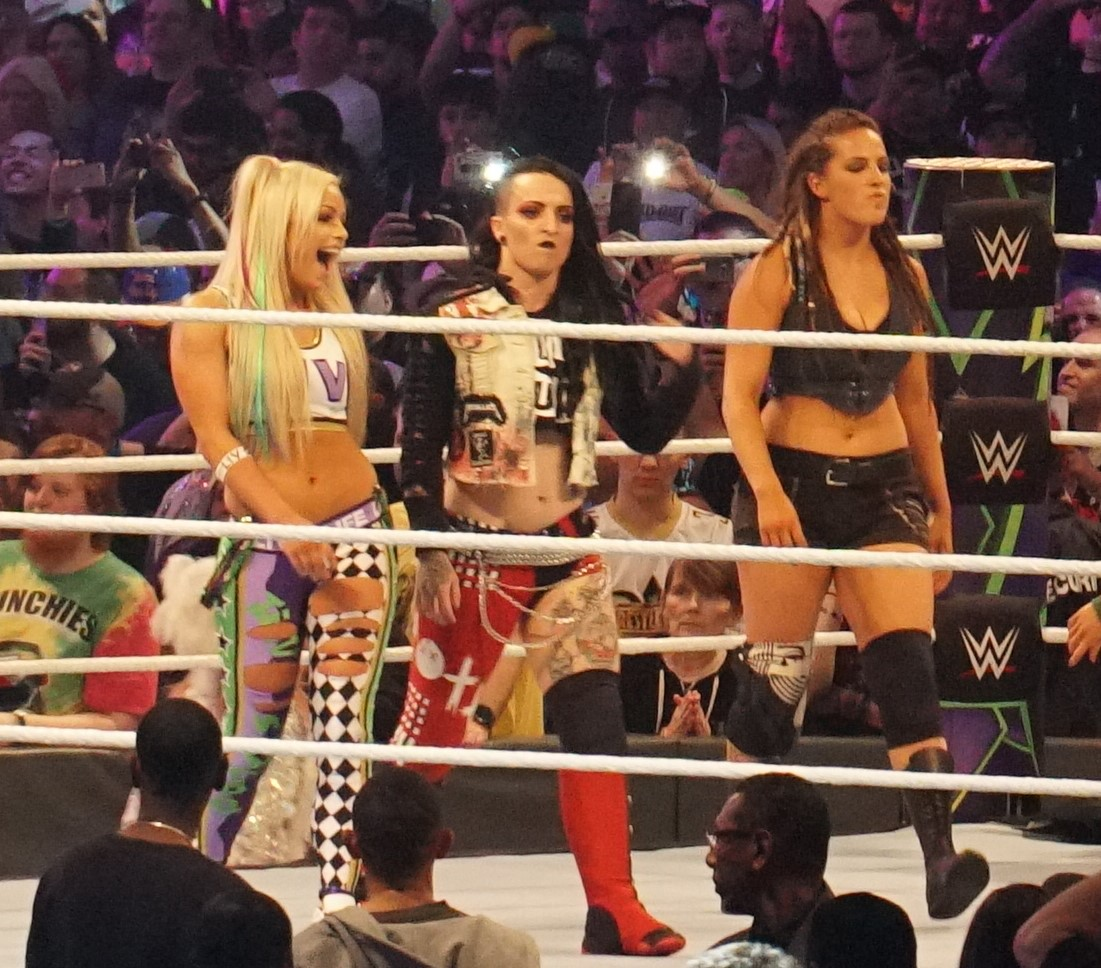
Morgan (left) along with fellow members of the Riott Squad Ruby Riott (center) and Sarah Logan (right) at WrestleMania 34

On the November 21, 2017, episode of SmackDown, Morgan made her main roster debut alongside Ruby Riott and Sarah Logan, attacking both Becky Lynch and Naomi, establishing themselves as heels in the process. On the same night, they interrupted a match between SmackDown Women's Champion Charlotte Flair and Natalya, then proceeded to attack both of them. The following week on SmackDown, the trio, now called "The Riott Squad", made their in-ring debuts for the brand, defeating Flair, Naomi, and Natalya in a six-woman tag team match. On January 28, 2018, Morgan participated in the first women's Royal Rumble match at the Royal Rumble pay-per-view as the eleventh entrant, but was eliminated by Michelle McCool. Morgan made her WrestleMania debut at WrestleMania 34 on April 8 by participating in the 20-woman WrestleMania Women's Battle Royal, but failed to win the match.

On April 16, the Riott Squad were drafted to Raw brand as part of the 2018 WWE Superstar Shake-up, and caused the match between Bayley and Sasha Banks to end in a no contest. At the inaugural all women's pay-per-view Evolution on October 28, the Riott Squad lost to Natalya, Bayley and Sasha Banks. On January 27, 2019, at Royal Rumble, Morgan participated in the women's Royal Rumble match, only to be the first to be eliminated after lasting 8 seconds, setting the record for the shortest time in the women's Royal Rumble match. Morgan and Logan competed in a six-team Elimination Chamber match for the inaugural WWE Women's Tag Team Championship at the namesake pay-per-view on February 17, where they were the third team eliminated by Nia Jax and Tamina. Morgan competed at WrestleMania 35 on April 7 in a women's battle royal match that was eventually won by Carmella.

==== Brand switches (2019–2022) ====
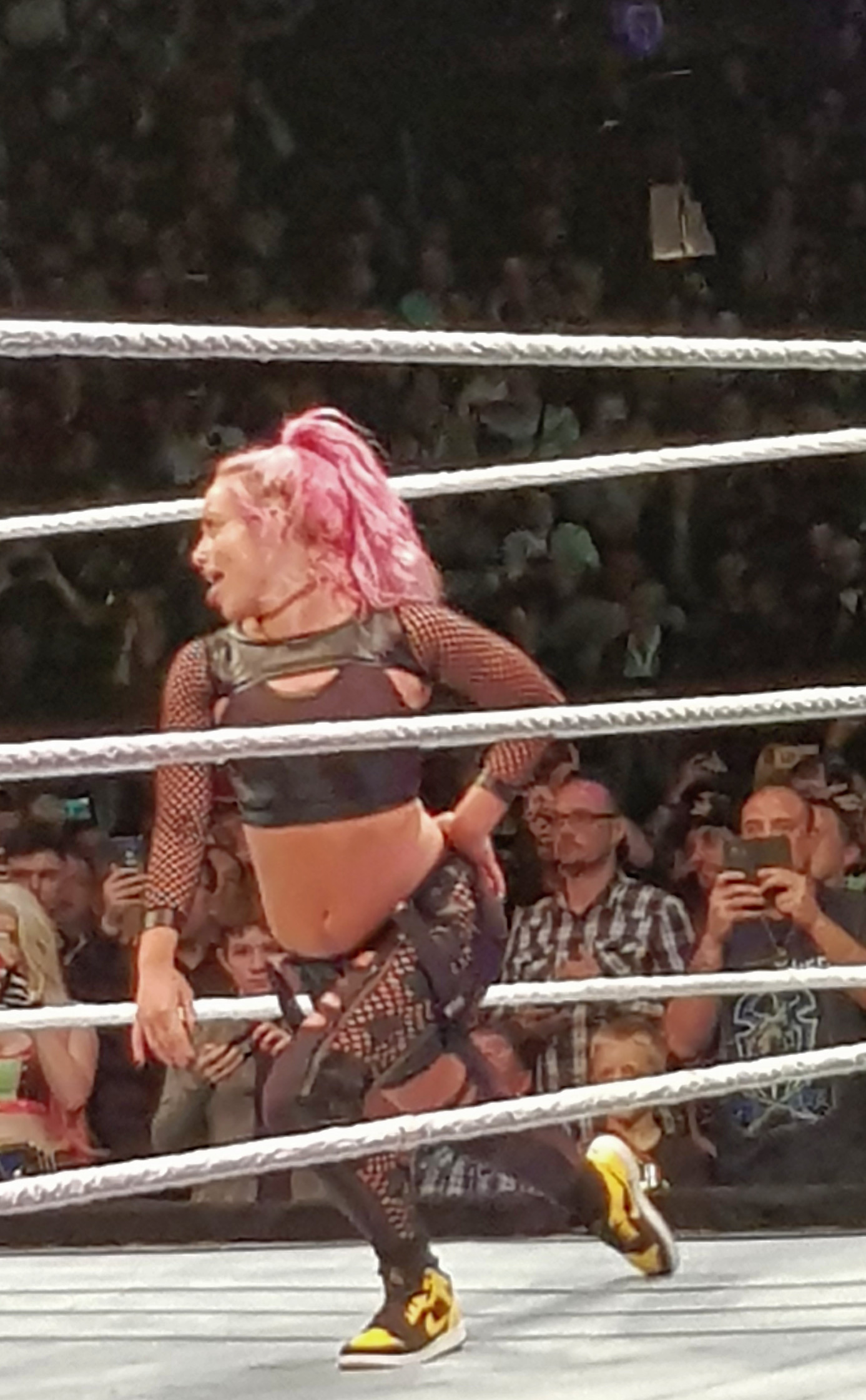
Morgan in 2019

On April 16, Morgan was moved to the SmackDown brand as part of the Superstar Shake-up, effectively dissolving the Riott Squad in the process. On the July 16 episode of SmackDown, Morgan turned face when she confronted Charlotte Flair and faced her in a match, in which Morgan lost by submission.

On the October 14 episode of Raw, Morgan was the final overall pick of the year's draft, being drafted back to the Raw brand. Throughout the month of December, vignettes aired promoting Morgan's return. Morgan returned to television on the December 30 episode of Raw, during Bobby Lashley and Lana's storyline wedding, interrupting the proceedings and professing her love for Lana. After Lana subsequently attacked her, she aligned herself with Rusev, who had been feuding with Lana and Lashley, thus cementing her face turn. Morgan defeated Lana on the January 27, 2020, episode of Raw, doing so once again the following week. After her feud with Lana ended, Morgan entered a feud with her former Riott Squad teammate Ruby Riott who turned on her upon returning. On the March 2 episode of Raw, Morgan defeated Riott with Sarah Logan as the special guest referee. At Elimination Chamber on March 8, Morgan entered her second Elimination chamber match, during which she was eliminated by eventual winner Shayna Baszler. On the WrestleMania 36 pre-show on April 5, Morgan defeated Natalya. After WrestleMania, Morgan continued her feud with Riott and defeated her on the April 20 and 27 episodes of Raw respectively.

After Morgan lost to Natalya on the June 22 episode of Raw, Ruby Riott attempted to console Morgan backstage after her loss, which she rebuffed. On the August 3 episode of Raw, Riott asked Morgan to join her in reforming the Riott Squad, only to be interrupted by the IIconics, who mocked the two; this led to a tag team match where Morgan and Riott defeated the IIconics. At Payback on August 30, Morgan and Riott (now officially known as the Riott Squad again) defeated the IIconics and once more the following night on Raw, forcing the IIconics to disband, per stipulation.

As part of the 2020 Draft in October, Morgan and Riott were drafted to the SmackDown brand. She won a fatal four-way match during her first night on SmackDown after the Draft to qualify for the women's team at Survivor Series on November 22, in which she and her brand partners lost. They challenged for a shot at the Women's Tag Team Championship on the first night of WrestleMania 37 on April 10, but failed to win the match. Riott was released by WWE on June 2, 2021, effectively disbanding the Riott Squad for the second time.

Morgan competed in the Money in the Bank ladder match at the eponymous event on July 18, but failed to win the match. At Extreme Rules on September 26, Morgan defeated Carmella in the pre-show. As part of the 2021 Draft, Morgan was drafted to the Raw brand. In October, Morgan entered the Queen's Crown tournament, where she lost to Carmella in the first round. On the November 8 episode of Raw, Morgan won a fatal 5-way match to earn a shot at the Raw Women's Championship, which was held by Becky Lynch. Morgan received her title match against Lynch on the December 6 episode of Raw, but lost. Morgan failed to win the title in a rematch at Day 1 on January 1, 2022. She participated in the Royal Rumble match at the namesake event on January 19, entering at #6 but was eliminated by Brie Bella. At Elimination Chamber on February 19, Morgan entered the Elimination Chamber match for a Raw Women's Championship match at WrestleMania 38, eliminating Doudrop but was eliminated by Alexa Bliss. In March, Morgan began teaming with Rhea Ripley, challenging for the Women's Tag Team Championship in a fatal four-way tag team match on the second night of WrestleMania 38 on April 3 in a losing effort. On the April 18 episode of Raw, they faced new champions Sasha Banks and Naomi for the titles, but lost, and after the match, Ripley would attack Morgan, ending their partnership. At Hell in a Cell on June 5, Morgan, AJ Styles and Finn Bálor lost to the Judgment Day (Edge, Damian Priest and Rhea Ripley) in a six-person mixed tag team match.

==== Championship reigns (2022–2023) ====
On the June 13 episode of Raw, Morgan and Alexa Bliss defeated Doudrop and Nikki A.S.H. to qualify for the women's Money in the Bank ladder match. At the event on July 2, Morgan won the Money in the Bank contract, granting her a women's championship match at any time of her choosing. Later that night, following the SmackDown Women's Championship match between Natalya and Ronda Rousey, Morgan cashed in her contract on the latter to win the title, making her the third woman and fifth superstar to successfully cash-in the Money in the Bank contract the same night after winning it. A rematch between Morgan and Rousey was set for SummerSlam on July 30, where Morgan controversially retained the title; Morgan tapped out to Rousey's armbar, but the referee had counted Rousey's shoulders down, giving the pinfall win to Morgan. After the match, both Morgan and the referee were attacked by Rousey. At Clash at the Castle on September 3, Morgan retained the title against Shayna Baszler. Rousey won a fatal five-way elimination match on the September 9 episode of SmackDown, earning a rematch against Morgan at Extreme Rules. The following week, Morgan challenged Rousey to an Extreme Rules match for the title, which Rousey accepted. At the event on October 8, Morgan lost the SmackDown Women's Championship back to Rousey, ending her reign at 98 days.

Morgan entered the women's Royal Rumble match at the titular event on January 28, 2023. She entered at #2 and lasted over one hour before being the last one eliminated by the match's winner and first entrant Rhea Ripley; Ripley and Morgan hence eclipsed Bianca Belair's record of 56:52 set at the 2021 Royal Rumble, with official times of 1:01:08 and 1:01:07 respectively. She then took part in the women's Elimination Chamber match at the titular event on February 18, but was eliminated by Natalya and Asuka. At Night 2 of WrestleMania 39, Morgan teamed with Raquel Rodriguez to take part in the women's WrestleMania Showcase fatal four-way tag team match, which was won by Ronda Rousey and Shayna Baszler. The following night on Raw, Morgan teamed with Rodriguez to defeat Damage CTRL in a number one contenders match for the WWE Women's Tag Team Championship, with the match being scheduled for the following week against reigning champions Lita and Becky Lynch. On the April 10 episode of Raw, they won their title match and became the new Tag Team Champions, with Morgan winning the title for the first time individually. On the April 21 episode of SmackDown, Morgan and Rodriguez retained their titles against Sonya Deville and Chelsea Green.

As part of the 2023 WWE Draft, Morgan was drafted to the Raw brand. On the May 19 episode of SmackDown, Morgan and Rodriguez vacated the titles due to Morgan suffering a shoulder injury, ending their first reign at 39 days. Morgan would make her return on the June 23 episode of SmackDown. At Money in the Bank on July 1, Morgan and Rodriguez successfully challenged Rousey and Baszler for the WWE Women's Tag Team Championship; Baszler turned on her partner and attacked Rousey, opening the door for Morgan to pin her and win the match, earning Morgan and Rodriguez their second reign as the Women's Tag Team Champions. On the July 17 episode of Raw, Morgan and Rodriguez lost the WWE Women's Tag Team Championship to Sonya Deville and Chelsea Green due to Rhea Ripley attacking them backstage before their match, ending their second reign at 16 days. The following week, Morgan was scheduled to face Ripley, however, the match never began as Ripley viciously attacked Morgan with a steel chair. This was done to write Morgan off television, as she suffered another shoulder injury.

==== The Judgment Day (2024–present) ====
After a 6-month hiatus, Morgan returned at the 2024 Royal Rumble entering the Royal Rumble match at number 30. Morgan went on to be runner-up in the match for a second year in a row, eliminating Zoey Stark and Jade Cargill in the process, before being eliminated by the winner, Bayley. She then took part in the women's Elimination Chamber match at the titular event, but was the last woman eliminated by Becky Lynch.

On the April 8 episode of Raw, Morgan attacked Rhea Ripley in a backstage segment, during which Ripley legitimately injured her right arm and was forced to vacate the Women's World Championship. Over the next few weeks, Morgan began to display more villainous traits. At King and Queen of the Ring on May 25, Morgan defeated Lynch to win the title for the second time after accidental interference from Ripley's love interest, "Dirty" Dominik Mysterio. Two nights later on Raw, Morgan defeated Lynch in a steel cage match to retain her title after another accidental interference from Dominik, before forcefully kissing Dominik after the match concluded. One week later, she continued her pursuit of Mysterio, believing him to have intentionally assisted her in her victories over Lynch, though members of The Judgment Day attempted to keep the two separated. On the June 24 episode of Raw, Morgan helped Judgment Day members Finn Bálor and JD McDonagh defeat Awesome Truth (The Miz and R-Truth) for the World Tag Team Championship. Two weeks later on Raw, Ripley made her return and Morgan ran off while Ripley confronted Dominik. The following week, Ripley called out Morgan and challenged her to a match at SummerSlam for the title, Morgan appeared on the screen and accepted the challenge.

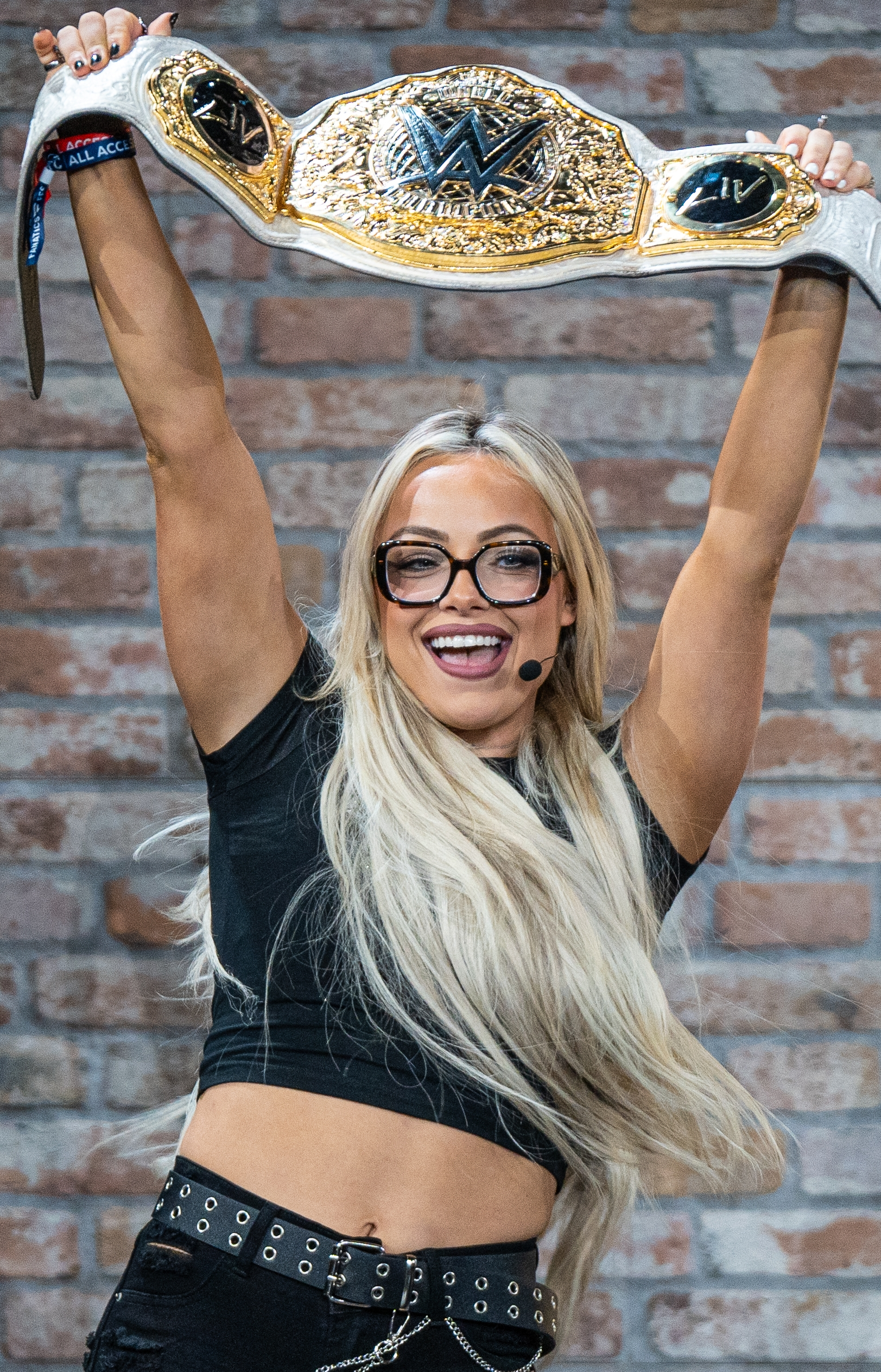
Morgan as Women's World Champion in August 2024

At SummerSlam on August 3, Morgan defeated Ripley to retain her title after interference from Dominik, giving Ripley her first pinfall loss since May 2022. After the match, Dominik turned on Ripley and kissed Morgan, officially becoming an on-screen couple and fully turning Morgan heel for the first time since 2019. On the following episode of Raw, Morgan officially joined The Judgment Day as Ripley and Damian Priest were excommunicated from the group. At Bash in Berlin on August 31, Morgan and Mysterio lost to Ripley and Priest in a mixed tag team match despite interference from Bálor, McDonagh, and Carlito, with Morgan being pinned by Ripley. At Bad Blood on October 5, Morgan lost to Ripley by disqualification after a returning Raquel Rodriguez attacked Ripley and allied herself with Morgan and The Judgment Day. Since championships do not change hands via disqualification or countout unless stipulated, Morgan remained champion. At Crown Jewel on November 2, Morgan defeated WWE Women's Champion Nia Jax to win the inaugural WWE Women's Crown Jewel Championship after interference from Mysterio and Rodriguez. On the November 11 episode of Raw, Morgan and Rodriguez failed to win the WWE Women's Tag Team Championship from Bianca Belair and Jade Cargill. At Survivor Series: WarGames on November 30, Morgan participated in her first WarGames match alongside Rodriguez, Jax, Tiffany Stratton, and Candice LeRae against Ripley, Belair, Bayley, Iyo Sky, and Naomi in a losing effort, with Morgan being pinned by Ripley. At Saturday Night's Main Event on December 14, Morgan defeated Sky to retain the title. At the premiere of Raw on Netflix, Morgan lost the title to Ripley despite interference from Mysterio and Rodriguez, ending her reign at 226 days to end their feud.

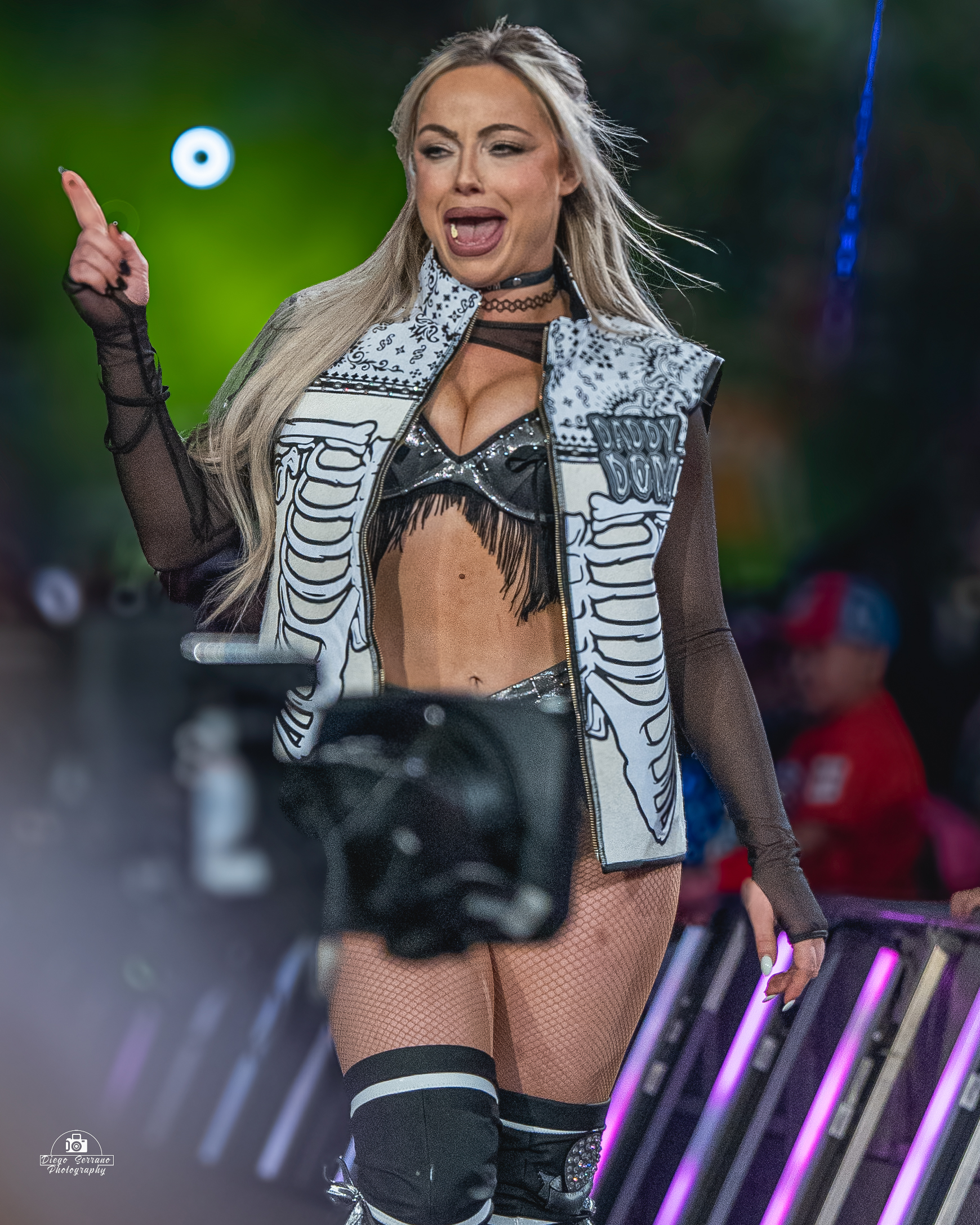
Morgan making her entrance at the Royal Rumble in February 2025

After losing the title, Morgan began exclusively teaming with Rodriguez. At the Royal Rumble on February 1, Morgan entered the namesake match at #2, lasting over an hour and eliminating Natalya and Alexa Bliss before being eliminated by Jax. On the February 24 episode of Raw, Morgan and Rodriguez defeated Belair and Naomi to win the WWE Women's Tag Team Championship for a record-setting third time after interference from Mysterio. Morgan and Rodriguez lost the titles to Lyra Valkyria and the returning Lynch at Night 2 of WrestleMania 41, but regained them in a rematch the next night on Raw. They also defended the title on NXT on April 22, where they defeated Gigi Dolin and Tatum Paxley. On the June 16 episode of Raw, Morgan legitimately suffered a dislocated shoulder during a match against Kairi Sane, leading to Roxanne Perez joining The Judgment Day and replacing Morgan as champion. WWE recognizes this as a separate reign, thus ending Morgan's reign with Rodriguez at 70 days.

After a five-month hiatus, Morgan returned at Survivor Series: WarGames on November 29, helping Mysterio capture the Intercontinental Championship from John Cena. At the 2026 Royal Rumble, Morgan won the Women's Royal Rumble match from the #14 spot by last eliminating Tiffany Stratton. On the February 23 episode of Raw, Morgan declared that she will challenge Stephanie Vaquer for the Women's World Championship at WrestleMania 42. At the event, Morgan defeated Vaquer to win the title.

Morgan subsequently entered the Queen of the Ring tournament with the goal of becoming a double world champion. At Night of Champions on June 27, Morgan lost to Iyo Sky in the tournament final. After the match, Sky announced that she would face Morgan for the title at SummerSlam. At the event on August 1 Night 1, Morgan successfully retained the title in her first defense against Sky. Morgan made an appearance for sister promotion Lucha Libre AAA Worldwide (AAA) at Week 3 of Verano de Escándalo on August 8 where she interrupted Mysterio's pre-taped interview conducted by Andrea Bazarte. At a live event in Santiago, Chile on September 12, Morgan lost the Women's World Championship back to Vaquer after interference from guest referee Becky Lynch, ending her reign at 147 days. The feud between the three eventually led to a triple threat match on October 10, at Money in the Bank, where Morgan regained the title. At Crown Jewel on November 7, Morgan lost to WWE Women's Champion Chelsea Green for the Crown Jewel Championship.

On the November 16 edition of Raw, Morgan was officially invited by John Cena to participate in the first ever John Cena Classic.

== Other media ==
Liv Morgan made her video game debut as a playable character in WWE 2K19, and later appeared in WWE 2K20, WWE 2K Battlegrounds, WWE 2K22, WWE 2K23, WWE 2K24, WWE 2K25 and WWE 2K26. In April 2026, Morgan was added as a playable character in Fortnite as part of a WWE collaboration.

In 2022, Morgan made a guest appearance on the second season of Chucky. In 2023, Morgan made her first movie appearance in The Kill Room, starring alongside Maya Hawke, Samuel L. Jackson and Uma Thurman. She starred in Takashi Miike's film Bad Lieutenant: Tokyo, which released in October 2026.

Morgan released the music video for her song "Trouble" on April 13, 2026. The song received mostly negative reviews from listeners, with critics deeming the song "atrocious".

== Filmography ==
=== Film ===
Film
Year	Title	Role	Notes
2020	Liv Forever	Herself	Documentary; short film
2023	The Kill Room	Emma	
2026	Bad Lieutenant: Tokyo	TBA	Post-production

=== Television ===
Television
Year	Title	Role	Notes
2015, 2019	Total Divas	Herself	Guest: Season 4, episode 9: "Clash of the Divas"; Recurring: Season 9
2018	Ride Along	Herself	1 episode
2019	Table for 3	Herself	1 episode
2021	Attack of the Show!	Herself	
2022	Miz & Mrs.	Herself	Episode: "The Royal Return"
2022	Celtic Warrior Workouts	Herself	episode 107
2022	Chucky	Herself	Episode: "Death On Denial"
2023	Jersey Shore: Family Vacation	Herself	Episode: "Get Your Sack in the Hole"
2023	Celebrity Family Feud	Herself	Episode: "WWE Women vs. WWE Men and Marcus Lemonis vs. Bert Kreischer"
2024	Love & WWE: Bianca & Montez	Herself	2 episodes
2025	Chamber of Horrors	Herself	Episode: “Liv Morgan & Raquel Targeted By Ghosts in Worlds Most Haunted Prison”
2025	The Kelly Clarkson Show	Herself	Season 6, episode 106
2026	Hell's Kitchen	Herself	Co-presented the first challenge in the Black Jacket tournament; Episode: "Battle for Black Jackets"

== Personal life ==
Daddio is agnostic.

Daddio has a tattoo on the back of her neck, reading "11–21–17", which is colored blue, red, and green. Her tattoo matches with her fellow Riott Squad members, as they all got the same tattoo to commemorate the date of their main roster debut.

Daddio was in a relationship with fellow professional wrestler Eric Arndt. Their relationship ended when Daddio accused Arndt of cheating on her.

By November 2020, Daddio had taken up a course to become a real estate agent at the Bob Hogue School of Real Estate.

Daddio donated all of her July 2022 Cameo earnings to the National Network of Abortion Funds following the Supreme Court ruling overturning of Roe v. Wade, asking fans to "consider booking a cameo from me so we can ensure every woman around the world has a choice".

Daddio is a supporter of the Green Bay Packers, having led a rendition of the "Beer Barrel Polka" during a game at Lambeau Field in December 2023.

On December 14, 2023, Daddio was arrested for possession of cannabis (not more than 20 grams) and possession of a cannabis vape pen, thought to be containing synthetic cannabinoids, in Sumter County, Florida. The sheriff's deputy reportedly saw her vehicle crossing over the white and yellow lines of a County road. Daddio was then booked into the Sumter County Jail and then released after posting a $3,000 bond.

== Championships and accomplishments ==
- ESPN
  - Ranked No. 9 of the 30 best Pro Wrestlers Under 30 in 2023
  - Ranked No. 6 of the Top 10 Women Wrestler of Pro Wrestling Power in 2024
- Fightful
  - Women's Tag Team of the Year (2025) - with The Judgement Day
- FOX Sports
  - "Out of Character" Guest of the Year (2022)
- Live Audio Wrestling End of Year Awards
  - Spinoff Series Awards (2 times)
    - Worst Wrestler: Female (2016)
    - Worst Match of the Year (2016) – with Aliyah
- New York Post
  - Female Breakout Wrestler of the Year (2022)
  - Faction of the Year (2024) as part of The Judgment Day
  - Best OMG Moment (2024) Liv Morgan kisses Dominik Mysterio at Summerslam
- Pro Wrestling Illustrated
  - Comeback of the Year (2024)
  - Ranked No. 6 of the top 250 female wrestlers in the PWI Women's 250 in 2026
  - Ranked No. 48 of the top 50 Tag Teams in the PWI Tag Team 50 in 2021 – with Ruby Riott
  - Ranked No. 24 of the top 100 Tag Teams in the PWI Tag Team 100 in 2023 – with Raquel Rodriguez
- Slam Wrestling Awards
  - Worst Feud - Female (2022) – with Ronda Rousey
- SiriusXM Busted Open Radio
  - Female Wrestler of the Year (2024)
- Uncrowned
  - Ranked No. 1 of the top female wrestlers Uncrowned Pound For Pound Pro Wrestling in 2024
- Women's Wrestling Fan Awards
  - Best Face of the Year (2021, 2022)
  - Breakout Star of the Year (2022)
  - Most Improved of the Year (2020)
  - Wrestler of the year (2024)
- WWE
  - Women's World Championship (Note: Morgan's first reign occurred when the title was known as the SmackDown Women's Championship.) (4 times, current)
  - WWE Women's Crown Jewel Championship (2024)
  - WWE Women's Tag Team Championship (4 times) – with Raquel Rodriguez
  - Women's Royal Rumble (2026)
  - Women's Money in the Bank (2022)
  - Slammy Award (2 times)
    - Female Superstar of the Year (2025)
    - Villain of the Year (2025) – with Dominik Mysterio
