= Love & WWE: Bianca & Montez =

- Genre: Reality television
- Starring: Bianca Belair; Montez Ford
- Country of origin: United States
- Original language: English
- No. of seasons: 1
- No. of episodes: 8

Production
- Production companies: Spoke Studios; WWE

Original release
- Network: Hulu
- Release: February 2, 2024

Love & WWE: Bianca & Montez is a reality television series starring WWE wrestlers Bianca Belair and Montez Ford. The series follows their lives inside and outside of the ring in the build-up to WrestleMania 39. Filming commenced at the 2023 Royal Rumble. The eight episodes were released on February 2, 2024, through digital streaming service Hulu.

== Production ==
On November 2, 2023, Hulu announced the reality series starring WWE stars Belair and Ford. The first season was filmed for six months in 2023, focusing on the WrestleMania season.

== Episodes ==
=== Series overview ===
Season	Episodes	Originally released
1	8	February 2, 2024

=== Season 1 ===
No. overall	No. in season	Title	Original release date	Prod. code	U.S. viewers (millions)
1	1	"Love & WWE"	February 2, 2024	101	N/A
2	2	"Planning A Baby"	February 2, 2024	102	N/A
3	3	"The Training Game"	February 2, 2024	103	N/A
4	4	"Crunch Time"	February 2, 2024	104	N/A
5	5	"Long Distance Love"	February 2, 2024	105	N/A
6	6	"Too Busy To Get Busy"	February 2, 2024	106	N/A
7	7	"Stress & Mania"	February 2, 2024	107	N/A
8	8	"The Main Event"	February 2, 2024	108	N/A
