= Crown Jewel (2023) =

WWE premium live event

Crown Jewel جوهرة التاج (Arabic)
- Promotional poster featuring various WWE wrestlers
- Promotion: WWE
- Brand(s): Raw; SmackDown
- Date: November 4, 2023
- City: Riyadh, Saudi Arabia
- Venue: Mohammed Abdo Arena

WWE event chronology
← Previous; Fastlane	Next → Survivor Series: WarGames

WWE in Saudi Arabia chronology
← Previous; Night of Champions	Next → King and Queen of the Ring

Crown Jewel chronology
← Previous; 2022	Next → 2024

The 2023 Crown Jewel (Arabic: جوهرة التاج, romanized: jawharat altaaji) was a professional wrestling premium live event (PLE) produced by the American company WWE, held for wrestlers from the promotion's main roster brands, Raw and SmackDown. It was the fifth Crown Jewel and took place on Saturday, November 4, 2023, at Mohammed Abdo Arena in Riyadh, Saudi Arabia. The event was held as part of the city's annual Riyadh Season festivities and aired live at 8:00 p.m. Arabia Standard Time (1:00 p.m. Eastern Time). This was the second Crown Jewel held at this venue, after the 2021 event, and the 10th event that WWE held in Saudi Arabia under a 10-year partnership in support of Saudi Vision 2030.

Eight matches were contested at the event, including one on the Kickoff pre-show. In the main event, which was the main match from SmackDown, Roman Reigns defeated LA Knight to retain the Undisputed WWE Universal Championship. In what was Raw's main match, Seth "Freakin" Rollins defeated Drew McIntyre to retain the World Heavyweight Championship, which was also the opening bout. In another prominent match, Logan Paul defeated Rey Mysterio to win SmackDown's WWE United States Championship. The event also saw the return of Kairi Sane to WWE; her last WWE match was in July 2020, however, she had remained with the company until December 2021 as a Japanese ambassador. Saudi Arabian actor and comedian Ibrahim Al Hajjaj also made an appearance.

This was the first Crown Jewel to livestream on Disney+ in the Philippines, Binge in Australia, and Abema in Japan. It was also the final WWE event to be officially distributed on DVD in Europe, as well as the penultimate release in the United States, as WWE opted not to renew Fremantle's contract for home video releases after 2023 and shut down its home video division at the end of the year. Crown Jewel had a two-disc release on December 12 in the United States, December 18 in the United Kingdom, and December 22 in Germany.

== Production ==
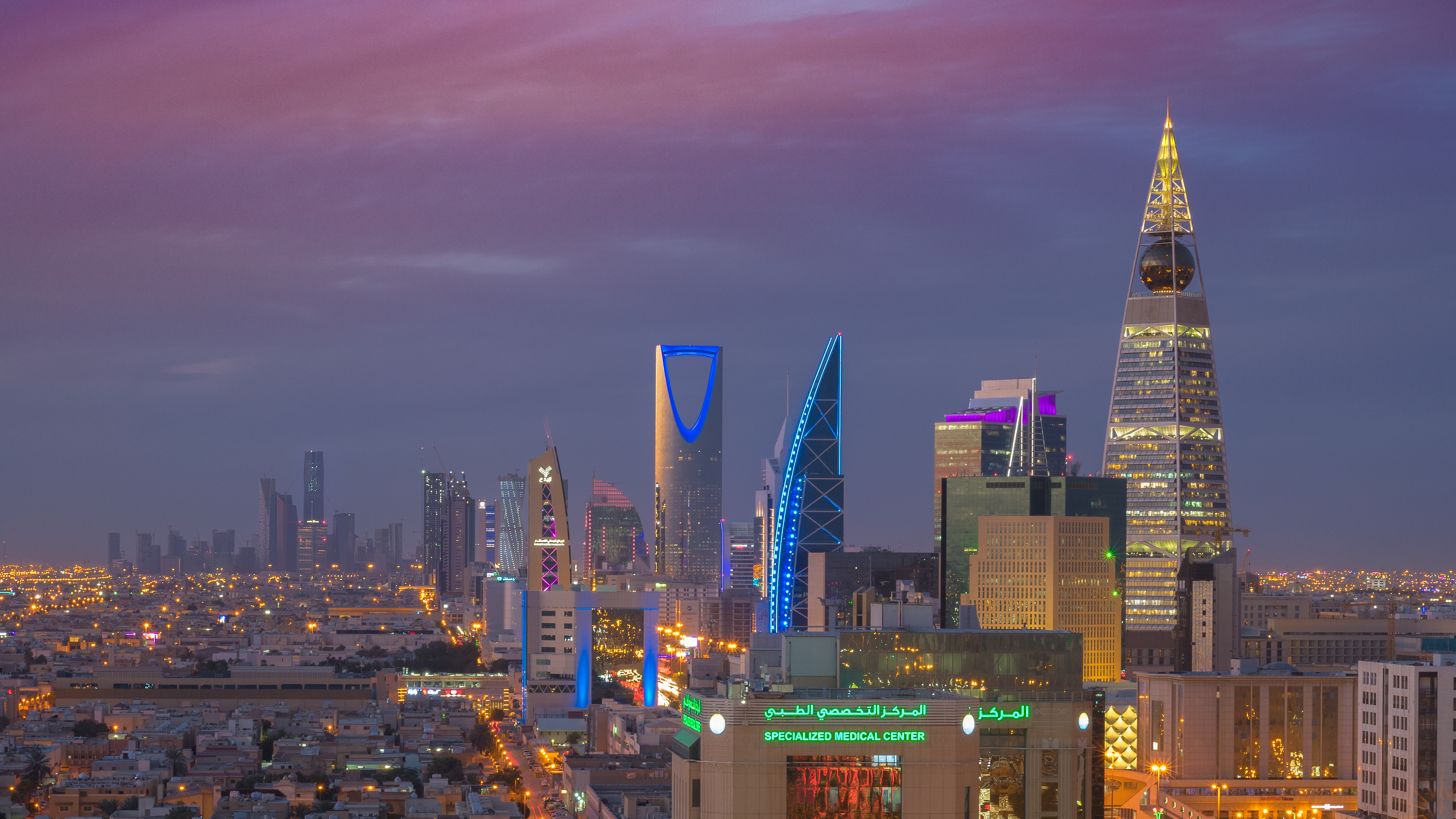
The fifth Crown Jewel was the second time for the event, after 2021, to be held at the Mohammed Abdo Arena in Riyadh, Saudi Arabia (pictured).

=== Background ===
Crown Jewel is a professional wrestling premium live event (PLE) produced by the American company WWE since 2018, held in late October–early November in Riyadh, Saudi Arabia. It has been held every year since, except in 2020 due to the COVID-19 pandemic, and it is held as part of the city's annual Riyadh Season festivities, which began in 2019. It is the main recurring event held as part of a 10-year strategic multiplatform partnership with the Ministry of Sport (formerly General Sports Authority) in support of Saudi Vision 2030, Saudi Arabia's social and economic reform program, a partnership that began in early 2018.

In July 2023, Wrestlenomics reported that Crown Jewel would be held on Saturday, November 4, 2023. It was then promoted by Riyadh Season in September, which advertised John Cena for the event. It was also reported that WWE would have other attractions along with Crown Jewel, including a theme park dark ride and an Undertaker-themed walk-through, among other things. On October 7, 2023, WWE officially announced the fifth Crown Jewel, and 10th overall event in the Saudi Arabian partnership, confirming the reported date of November 4 with the venue later confirmed as the Mohammed Abdo Arena. The event featured wrestlers from the Raw and SmackDown brand divisions and marked the second Crown Jewel held at this venue, after the 2021 event.

=== Broadcast outlets ===
The PLE was available through traditional pay-per-view (PPV) outlets worldwide. It was also available to livestream on Peacock in the United States, SonyLIV in India, Disney+ Hotstar in Indonesia, Disney+ in the Philippines, Binge in Australia, Abema in Japan, and the WWE Network everywhere else. It was the first Crown Jewel to livestream on Disney+, Binge, and Abema, after those countries' respective versions of the WWE Network merged under those services in November 2022, January 2023, and October 2023, respectively. With the event being held in Saudi Arabia, it aired live at 8:00 p.m. Arabia Standard Time (1:00 p.m. Eastern Time).

=== Storylines ===
The event comprised eight matches, including one on the pre-show, that resulted from scripted storylines. Results were predetermined by WWE's writers on the Raw and SmackDown brands, while storylines were produced on WWE's weekly television shows, Monday Night Raw and Friday Night SmackDown.

On the October 9 episode of Raw, while Seth "Freakin" Rollins was celebrating his successful World Heavyweight Championship defense at Fastlane, he was confronted by Drew McIntyre, who wanted a title match. Despite complaining about feeling fatigue from his Fastlane defense, Rollins accepted, believing it was for that night. However, McIntyre stated that he wanted to face a healed up Rollins and suggested the match for Crown Jewel, which Rollins accepted.

At Payback, Rhea Ripley defeated Raquel Rodriguez to retain the Women's World Championship. During a rematch on the September 11 episode of Raw, however, Nia Jax made a surprise return to WWE—her first appearance after a brief return at the Royal Rumble in January—and attacked Rodriguez, which allowed Ripley to retain her championship. However, Jax also attacked Ripley after the match. Jax then interfered in a tag team match that involved Shayna Baszler and Zoey Stark the following week. Over the next few weeks, Ripley, Rodriguez, Baszler, and Jax would interfere in each other's matches and brawl with each other. These eruptions would come to a head during the season premiere of Raw on October 16, as following another brawl between the women which also involved Stark, Raw General Manager Adam Pearce announced that Ripley would defend the Women's World Championship against Jax, Baszler, Stark, and Rodriguez in a fatal five-way match at Crown Jewel.

After endorsing LA Knight at Payback, and then teaming with him at Fastlane to defeat The Bloodline (Jimmy Uso and Solo Sikoa), John Cena opened the season premiere of SmackDown on October 13; however, he was interrupted by Sikoa, Paul Heyman, and the return of Bloodline leader and the Undisputed WWE Universal Champion, Roman Reigns, who had taken a vacation shortly after SummerSlam in August. Reigns gave Cena the option to leave the ring voluntarily or they would make him leave; however, Cena stated that he acknowledged Reigns and that he was not there to challenge him for the title as he had not earned the opportunity. Cena then introduced Knight as a worthy challenger. Knight came out and berated Reigns and noted his own rise to stardom in Reigns's absence. Uso then attacked Knight from behind only for Knight to throw him out of the ring. Reigns then ordered Sikoa to handle Knight, and the two faced each other in the main event where Uso tried to interfere once again, however, he was impeded by Cena, and Knight subsequently defeated Sikoa. Following the match, Reigns attacked Knight. On October 20, it was announced that Reigns would defend the Undisputed WWE Universal Championship against Knight at Crown Jewel. On SmackDown that night, after realizing he had not won a televised singles match since April 2018 and teasing retirement, Cena called out anyone to face him, which prompted Sikoa to come out and a brawl ensued. On October 27, a match between the two was also announced for Crown Jewel.

After winning his boxing match at MF & DAZN: X Series 10 – The Prime Card on October 14, Logan Paul, whose last WWE match was at SummerSlam in August, challenged Rey Mysterio for the United States Championship. Mysterio responded that Paul could find him any Friday on SmackDown. Paul then appeared on the October 20 episode and recounted that he already defeated Mysterio in a tag team match at WrestleMania 38 in April 2022, which was Paul's first WWE match. Mysterio then came out and accepted Paul's challenge for the United States Championship at Crown Jewel.

For months, Cody Rhodes had been at odds with The Judgment Day (Finn Bálor, Damian Priest, "Dirty" Dominik Mysterio, and Rhea Ripley), and their accomplice, JD McDonagh. At Fastlane, Rhodes and Jey Uso defeated Bálor and Priest to win the Undisputed WWE Tag Team Championship, however, Bálor and Priest regained the titles in a rematch during the season premiere of Raw on October 16. The following week, as Bálor and Priest were celebrating winning back the titles, Rhodes interrupted them. After Priest taunted and called Rhodes a failure, Rhodes challenged Priest to a match that night, however, Priest denied since he already had a match scheduled against Uso. Priest in turn challenged Rhodes to a match at Crown Jewel, which Rhodes accepted.

At SummerSlam, Bianca Belair won the WWE Women's Championship, however, following the match, Damage CTRL's Iyo Sky cashed-in her Money in the Bank contract and defeated Belair to win the title. On the August 18 episode of SmackDown, after Belair's team defeated Damage CTRL (Sky and Bayley) in a tag team match, Bayley and Sky viciously attacked Belair backstage with chairs, injuring Belair's knee (kayfabe). Two months later on the October 20 episode, after Sky successfully defended her championship against Charlotte Flair, Sky and Bayley attacked Flair, and Belair made a surprise return, saving Flair. The following week, Belair announced that after talking with SmackDown General Manager Nick Aldis, she would get her rematch for the WWE Women's Championship against Sky at Crown Jewel.

Since mid-July, Sami Zayn would also be embroiled in a rivalry against The Judgment Day (Finn Bálor, Damian Priest, "Dirty" Dominik Mysterio, and Rhea Ripley) and their accomplice, JD McDonagh. During this time, Zayn and Kevin Owens lost the Undisputed WWE Tag Team Championship to Bálor and Priest at Payback, and failed to regain them in a rematch. Following that, Owens was traded to SmackDown while Zayn remained on Raw and continued his rivalry with The Judgment Day. On the October 30 episode of Raw, as Ripley, Mysterio, and McDonagh were in the ring, Zayn interrupted and stated that despite the fact that he was alone, he would continue to fight The Judgment Day until the group ended. Following that, Zayn managed to escape from an attempted beatdown from Judgment Day. Later that night, a match between Zayn and McDonagh was announced for the Crown Jewel Kickoff pre-show.

== Event ==
Other on-screen personnel
Role:	Name:
English commentators	Michael Cole
English commentators	Wade Barrett
Arabic commentators	Faisal Al-Mughaisib
Arabic commentators	Jude Al-Dajani
Ring announcer	Byron Saxton
Referees	Danilo Anfibio
Referees	Shawn Bennett
Referees	Jessika Carr
Referees	Ryan Tran
Pre-show panel	Megan Morant
Pre-show panel	Matt Camp
Pre-show panel	Peter Rosenberg

=== Pre-show ===
On the Crown Jewel Kickoff pre-show, Sami Zayn faced JD McDonagh. During the match, Zayn delivered a lariat to McDonagh for a nearfall. McDonagh then performed a Spanish Fly on Zayn for a nearfall. As McDonagh attempted a moonsault, Zayn countered with a big boot. In the end, Zayn delivered a corner exploder suplex, the Helluva Kick, and a Blue Thunder Bomb on McDonagh to win the match.

=== Preliminary matches ===
The actual PLE opened with Seth "Freakin" Rollins defending the World Heavyweight Championship against Drew McIntyre. During the match, McIntyre delivered a vertical suplex to Rollins for a nearfall. Rollins then delivered a flying knee strike on McIntyre. As Rollins attempted a suicide dive, McIntyre caught him and performed an overhead belly-to-back suplex. Rollins performed a Pedigree on McIntyre for a nearfall. In the climax, as Rollins attempted a Phoenix Splash, McIntyre dodged it and performed the Claymore Kick on Rollins for another nearfall. As McIntyre attempted another Claymore, Rollins countered with a superkick and delivered the Pedigree and the Curb Stomp to McIntyre to retain the title. Following the match, McIntyre immediately departed backstage while Rollins sat in the ring. Damian Priest then came out and attempted to cash-in his Money in the Bank contract, however, Sami Zayn appeared from the crowd and shoved Priest into the ring post to prevent the cash-in. Zayn then ran off into the crowd with Priest's briefcase.

Next, Rhea Ripley defended the Women's World Championship against Shayna Baszler, Nia Jax, Raquel Rodriguez, and Zoey Stark in a fatal five-way match. In the closing moments, Ripley performed the Riptide on Baszler and Rodriguez attempted to pin Baszler. Ripley broke up the pin by delivering an avalanche Riptide on Stark onto Rodriguez and Baszler and then pinned Baszler to retain her title.

After that, John Cena faced Solo Sikoa. Cena began to target Sikoa's entire right arm in an attempt to prevent him from using the Samoan Spike. Despite this, Sikoa dominated the offence for almost all of the match. In the closing stages, Sikoa delivered a spinning heel kick to Cena for a nearfall. As Sikoa attempted a Samoan Spike on a seemingly broken Cena, Cena escaped and executed four of his moves of doom, including a five-knuckle shuffle. As Cena attempted the Attitude Adjustment, Sikoa escaped and delivered a Samoan Drop and a running corner hip attack on Cena for a nearfall. Cena recovered again and locked in the STF, but Sikoa managed to escape. Sikoa then delivered a Samoan Spike to Cena. Sikoa then delivered two more Samoan Spikes to Cena, who managed to still get up. Afterwards, Sikoa attacked Cena with several Samoan Spikes and pinned him to win the match. Following the match, the crowd gave Cena a standing ovation as he emotionally walked to the backstage area, further teasing a retirement.

Following this, Raw's The Miz hosted a "Miz TV" segment with special guest, Saudi Arabian actor and comedian Ibrahim Al Hajjaj, who starred in the 2022 Saudi wrestling comedy Sattar. They were interrupted by SmackDown's Grayson Waller, who wanted to turn the segment into "The Grayson Waller Effect". Miz and Waller argued and Hajjaj sided with Miz. After a scuffle, Miz hit the Skull Crushing Finale on Waller, followed by Hajjaj performing the People's Elbow on him.

Next, Rey Mysterio defended the United States Championship against Logan Paul. In the opening stages, Mysterio delivered a headscissors takedown to Paul. Paul then performed a rolling senton and a springboard moonsault to Mysterio for a two count. Mysterio attempted a moonsault, but Paul caught him and delivered a powerslam and a Buckshot Lariat. Paul then performed a moonsault fallaway slam to Mysterio for a nearfall. A member of Paul's entourage then appeared and gave Paul brass knuckles, but Mysterio kicked it away. Mysterio's Latino World Order stablemate Santos Escobar then came out and chased Paul's ally, but Escobar left the brass knuckles on the ring apron, which Paul retrieved. Mysterio then delivered a 619, but as he attempted a springboard splash, Paul impeded him with a One Lucky Punch with the brass knuckles and pinned Mysterio to win his first title in WWE.

In the fifth match, Iyo Sky defended the WWE Women's Championship against Bianca Belair. In the closing stages, Belair delivered an alley-oop powerbomb and a German suplex to Sky for a two count. Sky then performed the Orihara moonsault and a springboard dropkick to Belair for a nearfall. Belair then delivered the Glam Slam, but as she went for the pin, Sky's Damage CTRL stablemate Bayley came out and distracted referee Jessika Carr. As Carr was distracted, Belair attempted the Kiss of Death to Sky through an announce table, but Kairi Sane made her surprise return to WWE and delivered the Uraken to Belair. Sky then performed the Over the Moonsault to Belair and pinned her to retain her title. After the match, Sky and Sane attacked Belair, with Sane performing the Insane Elbow to Belair.

In the penultimate match, Cody Rhodes faced Damian Priest. In the closing stages, Rhodes delivered a Disaster Kick to Priest for a two count. Priest then delivered a lariat and the Reckoning to Rhodes on the announce table. As Priest tried for another Reckoning, Rhodes reversed it into a Cross Rhodes. Finn Bálor and JD McDonagh then came out and distracted the referee, allowing Priest to deliver the South of Heaven to Rhodes for a two count. "Dirty" Dominik Mysterio then came out with a steel chair, but Jey Uso appeared and impeded him with a superkick and another superkick to Bálor, and then chased all three out with the steel chair. Rhodes then delivered a Cody Cutter, a Bionic Elbow, and three Cross Rhodes to Priest and pinned him for the win.

=== Main event ===
In the main event, Roman Reigns (accompanied by Paul Heyman) defended the Undisputed WWE Universal Championship against LA Knight. In the opening stages, Knight delivered a swinging neckbreaker and a baseball slide dropkick to Reigns. Knight then performed a slingshot shoulder tackle to Reigns for a two count. Reigns then delivered an Uranage, but as he attempted a Superman Punch, Knight caught him and hit a fireman's carry neckbreaker. As Knight tried for a leaping elbow drop, Reigns moved out of the way and delivered a Superman Punch for a nearfall. Knight then delivered a superplex and a leaping elbow drop to Reigns for a two count. Solo Sikoa then came out to distract the referee, allowing Jimmy Uso to pull Reigns out of the ring. Reigns then delivered another Superman Punch and the Spear to Knight for a nearfall. Reigns locked in a guillotine choke, but Knight reversed it and hit the Blunt Force Trauma (BFT) for a two count, after Uso had put Reigns's foot on the rope (unbeknownst to the referee). Knight then repeatedly slammed Uso and Reigns's respective heads onto the announce table. Uso then attempted a superkick to Knight, but Knight caught him and delivered a belly-to-back suplex to him onto the announce table. Reigns then immediately performed a Spear to Knight through the barricade and another Spear to Knight inside the ring and pinned him to retain the title. This win marked Reigns's third retention of the WWE Universal Championship at three consecutive Crown Jewel events, and second with the WWE Championship.

== Reception ==
The event received mixed to positive reception. Writing for Wrestling Observer Newsletter, Dave Meltzer was mixed-to-positive. He gave the pre-show bout 3.25 stars, the World Heavyweight Championship match 4.5 stars, the fatal five-way match for the Women's World Championship 3.25 stars, the Sikoa–Cena match, United States Championship match, and Rhodes–Priest match all received 3.5 stars, the Women's Championship match 3 stars, and the main event 3.5 stars. However, as part of the 2023 Wrestling Observer Newsletter Awards, Crown Jewel was named "Worst Major Wrestling Show", becoming the second Crown Jewel to receive the award, after the inaugural 2018 event.

== Aftermath ==
This was the last Crown Jewel held before the introduction of the Crown Jewel Championship matches in 2024. These were established as annual matches at Crown Jewel to determine who is the "best of the best" between the reigning men's and women's world champions of Raw and SmackDown at the time of the event each year.

=== Raw ===
The following episode of Raw opened with World Heavyweight Champion Seth "Freakin" Rollins, who praised Drew McIntyre. He then invited Sami Zayn to the ring to thank him for preventing Damian Priest from cashing in his Money in the Bank contract at Crown Jewel. To show his gratitude, Rollins offered Zayn a title match, which occurred later that night. After Rollins retained the title, a brawl ensued with The Judgment Day (Priest, Finn Bálor, and "Dirty" Dominik Mysterio) and JD McDonagh, which also brought out Cody Rhodes and Jey Uso, subsequently leading to Raw General Manager Adam Pearce scheduling a WarGames match at Survivor Series: WarGames, pitting the team of Rollins, Rhodes, Uso, and Zayn against The Judgment Day and McDonagh. The following week, McDonagh was made an official member of The Judgment Day and later that night, McIntyre assisted Bálor and Priest in retaining the Undisputed WWE Tag Team Championship in a rematch against Rhodes and Uso, turning heel for the first time since 2020. McIntyre was subsequently added to Judgment Day's WarGames team with Randy Orton returning from an 18-month hiatus to be the fifth member of Rhodes' team.

Following Rhea Ripley's retention of the Women's World Championship over Zoey Stark, Raquel Rodriguez, Nia Jax, and Shayna Baszler, a battle royal was scheduled for the following Raw to determine Ripley's next challenger at Survivor Series: WarGames. Stark, Rodriguez, Jax, and Baszler all participated, with Stark last eliminating Baszler to win.

=== SmackDown ===
On the following SmackDown, LA Knight addressed his loss to Roman Reigns and claimed that had it not been for Jimmy Uso, he would have become the new Undisputed WWE Universal Champion. He also stated that he was not done with The Bloodline and would eventually win the championship. A match between Knight and Uso was also scheduled for the next episode, where Knight defeated Uso.

Rey Mysterio, along with his LWO stablemates, claimed that had Logan Paul not cheated and used brass knuckles during their match, he would still be the United States Champion. Fellow LWO stablemate Carlito interrupted and blamed Santos Escobar as he had left the brass knuckles on the ring apron. Escobar then left the ring in disbelief of the accusation and later turned on Mysterio by injuring Mysterio's left knee and striking it with the steel steps. The following week, after a confrontation between Escobar and the rest of the LWO, a match between Carlito and Escobar was scheduled for Survivor Series: WarGames. However, on the following week, Escobar viciously injured Carlito during a brawl, resulting in Dragon Lee replacing Carlito for the match.

A worried Bayley addressed the return of Kairi Sane and the future of Damage CTRL. WWE Women's Champion Iyo Sky and Dakota Kai claimed that they brought Sane in to make their group stronger. Sane then praised Bayley for her leadership of Damage CTRL and also stated that she had forgiven Bayley, referring to Sane's last WWE TV appearance in July 2020 when Bayley viciously attacked her. The group then embraced only for Bianca Belair, Charlotte Flair, and Asuka to interrupt with Belair stating that she assumed wrong of Sky, believing that Sky could defend her championship without help. Later, Damage CTRL (Bayley, Sky, and Sane) faced Belair, Flair, and Asuka which saw Asuka turn on Belair and Flair and join with Damage CTRL, subsequently reuniting Asuka with Sane. They then attacked Belair and Flair, as well as Shotzi, who attempted to make the save. The following week, Damage CTRL challenged Belair, Flair, Shotzi, and a partner of their choosing, later revealed to be Raw's Becky Lynch, to a WarGames match at Survivor Series: WarGames which was accepted.

On the November 17 episode of SmackDown, Paul Heyman praised Solo Sikoa's win over John Cena. He said that Cena would not be coming back to WWE or even Hollywood thanks to Sikoa.

== Results ==
No.	Results	Stipulations	Times
1^{P}	Sami Zayn defeated JD McDonagh by pinfall	Singles match	9:40
2	Seth "Freakin" Rollins (c) defeated Drew McIntyre by pinfall	Singles match for the World Heavyweight Championship	18:20
3	Rhea Ripley (c) defeated Nia Jax, Raquel Rodriguez, Shayna Baszler, and Zoey Stark by pinfall	Fatal five-way match for the Women's World Championship	11:05
4	Solo Sikoa defeated John Cena by pinfall	Singles match	16:10
5	Logan Paul defeated Rey Mysterio (c) by pinfall	Singles match for the WWE United States Championship	17:55
6	Iyo Sky (c) defeated Bianca Belair by pinfall	Singles match for the WWE Women's Championship	16:35
7	Cody Rhodes defeated Damian Priest by pinfall	Singles match	11:05
8	Roman Reigns (c) (with Paul Heyman) defeated LA Knight by pinfall	Singles match for the Undisputed WWE Universal Championship (Note: The name "Undisputed WWE Universal Championship" referred to both the WWE Championship and Universal Championship being held and defended together, although both titles remained independently active despite the undisputed championship being represented by one title belt.)	20:05
(c) / – the champion(s) heading into the match; P / – the match was broadcast on the pre-show
