= The Judgment Day =

Professional wrestling stable in WWE

- The stable's logo since August 2024

Stable
- Name: The Judgment Day
- Members: Dominik Mysterio; JD McDonagh; Liv Morgan; Raquel Rodriguez; Roxanne Perez
- Billed heights: Mysterio: 6 ft 1 in (1.85 m); McDonagh: 5 ft 10 in (1.78 m); Morgan: 5 ft 3 in (1.60 m); Rodriguez: 6 ft 0 in (1.83 m); Perez: 5 ft 1 in (1.55 m)
- Combined billed weight: 928 lb (421 kg)
- Former members: Edge (leader); Damian Priest; Rhea Ripley; Carlito; Finn Bálor
- Debut: April 3, 2022
- Years active: 2022–present

The Judgment Day is a villainous professional wrestling stable performing in WWE on the Raw brand. The group is composed of Dominik Mysterio, JD McDonagh, Liv Morgan, Raquel Rodriguez, and Roxanne Perez. Morgan is the current Women's World Champion in her third reign as part of the stable and fourth reign overall. The group also appears in WWE's sister promotion Lucha Libre AAA Worldwide (AAA).

The stable was established at WrestleMania 38 in April 2022 by Edge, who recruited Damian Priest and later Rhea Ripley. Two months later, following Finn Bálor's addition to the group, Edge was kicked out and a "no leadership" ideology was implemented. Dominik Mysterio later betrayed his father to join the group. The following year, Bálor recruited McDonagh. In 2024, having already loosely associated themselves with the group, Carlito and Morgan joined as replacements after Priest and Ripley were kicked out. Rodriguez soon joined the group and Perez joined in 2025, shortly after Carlito left WWE. In 2026, Bálor was kicked out of the group.

The Judgment Day have achieved several championship milestones, holding among the most titles of any group in WWE history. They captured the World Heavyweight Championship once (Priest), the Women's World Championship four times (Ripley once and Morgan three times), the WWE Intercontinental Championship twice (Mysterio), the WWE Women's Intercontinental Championship once (Rodriguez) and the NXT North American Championship twice (Mysterio), as well as a total of nine tag titles. They are the second stable (after The Bloodline) to have simultaneously held titles across three brands. Also as part of the stable, Ripley and Morgan won the 2023 and 2026 women's Royal Rumble matches, respectively, whereas Priest won the 2023 men's Money in the Bank contract,

In other promotions, the group captured the AAA Mega Championship once (Mysterio) in AAA as well as the WWC Puerto Rico Championship once (Carlito) in World Wrestling Council.

== Background ==
The faction's name was inspired by the 2009 iteration of the WWE pay-per-view event of the same name, the poster of which centered around Edge, the faction's founder, sporting the stable's then-signature goth-inspired look, as well as scales, which would become the group's symbol.

Following the groups restructuring in 2024, their entrance music was changed. Also, their logo was altered from the previous purple one to a black-and-white one reminiscent of a motorcycle club. It also removed certain insignia pointing to past members, such as the wings used by Damien Priest, while incorporating ones representing new members, such as an eye symbol associated with Morgan.

== History ==
=== World Wrestling Entertainment (2022–present) ===
==== Formation and Edge's leadership (2022) ====
On the February 21, 2022, episode of Raw, Edge reflected on all the WrestleMania moments in his career before issuing an open challenge for WrestleMania 38. The following week, his challenge was accepted by AJ Styles, to which Edge responded by performing a low blow on Styles before hitting him with a one-man con-chair-to, turning heel. At Night 2 of WrestleMania on April 3, Edge defeated Styles following a distraction by Damian Priest. Following WrestleMania, Edge and Priest revealed The Judgment Day as the name of the team. At WrestleMania Backlash on May 8, despite Priest being barred from ringside, Edge defeated Styles again after interference from a masked individual, later revealed to be Rhea Ripley, who became the stable's newest member.

At Hell in a Cell on June 5, The Judgment Day defeated Styles, Finn Bálor, and Liv Morgan in a six-person mixed tag team match. The next night on Raw, Edge introduced Bálor as the newest member of The Judgment Day; Bálor, Priest, and Ripley then suddenly attacked Edge with his own signature con-chair-to move and kicked him out of the group. The following week on the June 13 episode of Raw, Ripley, Priest, and Bálor interrupted Bianca Belair's in-ring interview to explain their actions and declare that the group would consist of equality with no leaders; during this time, the group also shifted away from hinting at supernatural traits but retained its goth aesthetic, adopting a more grounded gimmick described as a "gang of goth bullies".

==== Priest–Ripley era (2022–2024) ====
The Judgment Day then began a feud with The Mysterios (composed of Rey and Dominik Mysterio) in an attempt to recruit Dominik into their ranks. On July 30, Bálor and Priest lost to the Mysterios at SummerSlam after interference from the returning Edge. At Clash at the Castle on September 3, Bálor and Priest lost to Edge and Rey. After the match, Dominik attacked Edge with a low blow, followed by a clothesline to Rey, turning heel for the first time in his career. Two days later on Raw, Dominik officially joined The Judgment Day by helping the group attack Edge and Rey. On the following episode of Raw, Dominik lost to Edge by disqualification after interference from The Judgment Day, who attacked Edge's leg with a steel chair after the match. On the September 26 episode of Raw, Edge returned and challenged Bálor to an "I Quit" match at Extreme Rules, which Bálor accepted. At the event on October 8, Bálor defeated Edge. In the closing moments, Ripley positioned Edge's wife, Beth Phoenix, for a con-chair-to and Edge reluctantly submitted. After the match, Ripley still performed the con-chair-to on Phoenix.

Around this time, The Judgment Day continued recruiting Styles, who turned down several offers to join the group. On the October 10 episode of Raw, Styles seemingly accepted their offer, but rejected it and introduced the returning Luke Gallows and Karl Anderson; a brawl then ensued between the two teams. At Crown Jewel on November 5, Bálor, Priest, and Dominik defeated The O.C. (Styles, Anderson and Gallows) after interference from Ripley. On the following episode of Raw, The O.C. introduced the returning Mia Yim as their solution to counter Ripley. At Survivor Series WarGames on November 26, Bálor lost to Styles while Ripley's team lost to Team Belair in a WarGames match. On the following episode of Raw, The Judgment Day defeated The O.C. in an eight-person mixed tag team match to end their feud.

On the January 9, 2023 episode of Raw, Bálor, Priest and Dominik won a tag team turmoil match to win a Raw Tag Team Championship match against The Usos (Jey Uso and Jimmy Uso). At Raw is XXX on January 23, Priest and Dominik failed to win the titles after Sami Zayn replaced an injured Jimmy Uso. At Royal Rumble on January 28, Dominik, Bálor, and Priest participated in the men's Royal Rumble match. Bálor and Priest were eliminated by Edge, while Dominik was eliminated by the eventual winner, Cody Rhodes. Ripley also appeared at ringside to assist Bálor, Priest, and Dominik in their attack on Edge after eliminating him in turn, only to be attacked by Beth Phoenix. Later that night, Ripley won the women's Royal Rumble match by last eliminating Liv Morgan. With this victory, Ripley became the fourth wrestler (after Shawn Michaels in 1995, Chris Benoit in 2004, and Edge in 2021) and the first female to win the Royal Rumble as the first entrant. On the following episode of Raw, Ripley declared that she would be challenging Charlotte Flair for the SmackDown Women's Championship at WrestleMania 39. Flair previously won the 2020 Women's Royal Rumble and defeated Ripley for the NXT Women's Championship at WrestleMania 36.

At Elimination Chamber on February 18, Bálor and Ripley lost to Edge and Phoenix in a mixed tag team match despite interference from Dominik, while Priest failed to win the United States Championship inside the namesake structure after he was eliminated by Montez Ford. At Night 1 of WrestleMania 39 on April 1, Dominik lost to Rey after interference from the newly reformed Latino World Order (LWO) and Bad Bunny. Later that night, Ripley defeated Flair to win the SmackDown Women's Championship, becoming the seventh Women's Triple Crown champion, the fifth Women's Grand Slam champion, and giving the group their first championship. On Night 2, Bàlor, under his Demon persona, lost to Edge in a Hell in a Cell match to end the rivalry. During the match, Bálor suffered an injury after getting hit by a ladder thrown by Edge and was medically treated in the ring; the injury led to Bálor getting 14 staples in his head.

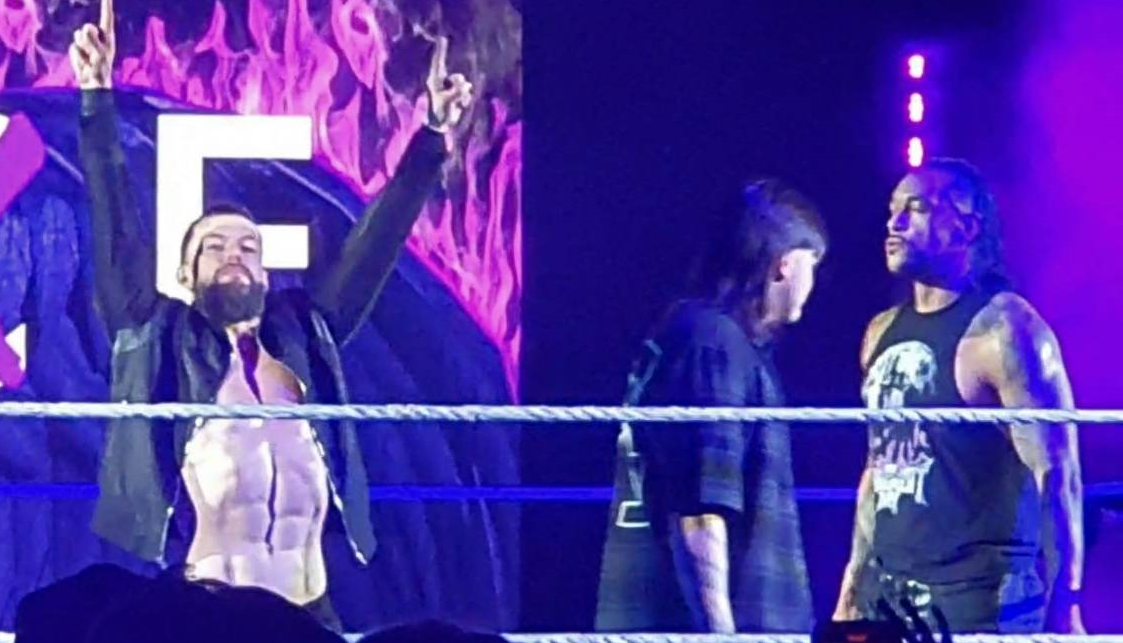
Judgment Day (from left to right: Finn Bálor, "Dirty" Dominik Mysterio, and Damian Priest) at a live event in 2023

On the Raw after WrestleMania, Priest confronted Bad Bunny for his involvement in Dominik's match against Rey, chokeslamming him through the announce table. At Backlash on May 6, Ripley successfully defended her title against Zelina Vega, while Priest lost to Bunny in a San Juan street fight after interference from Savio Vega and Carlito. Balor and Priest participated in a tournament for the new World Heavyweight Championship, but they were both eliminated by the eventual champion Seth "Freakin" Rollins. At Night of Champions on May 27, Ripley retained her title against Natalya. On the June 12 episode of Raw, the SmackDown Women's Championship was renamed to the Women's World Championship and Ripley was presented a brand-new championship belt. At Money in the Bank on July 1, Priest won the Money in the Bank ladder match, while Bálor failed to win the World Heavyweight Championship from Rollins after an unintended distraction by Priest. On July 18, Dominik defeated Wes Lee on NXT to win the NXT North American Championship, the first singles title in his wrestling career. At SummerSlam on August 5, Bálor again failed to win the World Heavyweight Championship from Rollins despite interference from Priest. Following the event, Bálor's longtime friend JD McDonagh became involved with the stable, much to the chagrin of the other members.

At Payback on September 2, Bálor and Priest defeated Kevin Owens and Sami Zayn to win the Undisputed WWE Tag Team Championship in a Pittsburgh Steel City Street Fight after interference from Dominik, Ripley and McDonagh. With this victory, Bálor became the 24th Grand Slam Champion and The Judgment Day became the second faction after The Bloodline to hold titles across all three brands. Later that night, Ripley retained the Women's World Championship against Raquel Rodriguez. At NXT No Mercy on September 30, Dominik lost the NXT North American Championship to Trick Williams, ending his first reign at 74 days. Following an ultimatum from Ripley, Dominik regained the title from Williams three days later on NXT. At Fastlane on October 7, Bálor and Priest lost the Undisputed WWE Tag Team Championship to Cody Rhodes and Jey Uso after McDonagh accidentally hit Priest's knee with the briefcase, ending their first reign at 35 days. Nine days later on Raw, they regained the titles after interference from Jimmy Uso.

On the November 13 episode of Raw, Priest and the rest of the group agreed to officially add McDonagh to their ranks as a full-fledged member. Priest and Bálor then retained their titles against Rhodes and Uso after interference from McIntyre. At Survivor Series: WarGames on November 25, Ripley defeated Stark to retain her title, while The Judgment Day and McIntyre lost to Rhodes, Rollins, Uso, Zayn and the returning Randy Orton in a WarGames match. On December 9, at NXT Deadline, Dominik lost the NXT North American Championship to Dragon Lee, ending his second reign at 67 days. The group then began feuding with R-Truth over his efforts to join them. On the December 18 episode of Raw, McDonagh lost to R-Truth in a Loser Leaves Judgment Day Miracle on 34th Street Fight match, but was still considered a member of the group. Later that night, Bálor and Priest retained the titles against the Creed Brothers. On January 1, 2024, Ripley retained her title against their Diamond Mine stablemate Ivy Nile at Raw: Day 1. At Elimination Chamber: Perth on February 24, Bálor and Priest defeated New Catch Republic (Pete Dunne and Tyler Bate) to retain their titles, while Ripley, in her home country of Australia, successfully defended her title against Jax in the main event. At Night 1 of WrestleMania XL on April 6, Ripley retained her title against Becky Lynch, while Bálor and Priest lost the SmackDown Tag Team Championship to A-Town Down Under (Austin Theory and Grayson Waller) and the Raw Tag Team Championship to Awesome Truth (The Miz and R-Truth) respectively in a six-pack tag team ladder match, ending their second reign with the undisputed titles at 173 days. Later that night, Dominik and Santos Escobar lost to Rey and Andrade.

The following day, at Night 2 of WrestleMania XL, Priest successfully cashed in his Money in the Bank contract on Drew McIntyre to win the World Heavyweight Championship following an attack by CM Punk. On the April 8 episode of Raw, Ripley was attacked in a backstage segment by Liv Morgan, during which Ripley legitimately injured her right arm and was forced to vacate the Women's World Championship the following week, ending her reign at 380 days, tying Bayley's record for the longest reign in the title's history. At Backlash France on May 4, Priest successfully defended the World Heavyweight Championship against Jey Uso. Around this time, Carlito, who had just recently turned on his LWO stablemates, began to insert himself into the group, but was kept at arm's length by Priest, citing their past conflict. At Clash at the Castle: Scotland on June 15, despite The Judgment Day being barred from ringside, Priest defeated McIntyre to retain his title after interference from Punk.

==== Morgan–Mysterio era (2024–present) ====
During Ripley's absence, a storyline of dissension and betrayals began where Dominik was seduced by Morgan. Dominik seemingly accidentally helped Morgan win the Women's World Championship from Becky Lynch on May 25 at King and Queen of the Ring, and seemingly accidentally helped her retain in a steel cage match two nights later on Raw. Morgan would also aid the group in their matches, helping Bálor and McDonagh win the World Tag Team Championship from Awesome Truth (The Miz and R-Truth) on the June 24 episode of Raw. On the July 8 episode of Raw, Dominik teamed with Morgan to defeat Rey Mysterio and Zelina Vega after he pinned his father. After the match, just as Dominik was about to kiss Morgan, he was confronted by the returning Ripley.

On August 3, at SummerSlam, Ripley failed to regain the Women's World Championship from Morgan following a distraction by Dominik, who kissed Morgan and left with her afterwards, while Priest lost the World Heavyweight Championship to Gunther after interference from Bálor. On the following episode of Raw, Ripley and Priest were removed from the group as Carlito and Morgan became official members. At Bad Blood on October 5, Morgan lost to Ripley by disqualification after the returning Raquel Rodriguez attacked Ripley, allowing Morgan to remain champion since titles do not change hands via countout or disqualification unless stipulated. Rodriguez also became the group's newest member. At Crown Jewel on November 2, Morgan defeated WWE Women's Champion Nia Jax to win the inaugural WWE Women's Crown Jewel Championship after interference from Dominik and Rodriguez. At Survivor Series WarGames on November 30, Morgan and Rodriguez teamed up with Jax, Tiffany Stratton and Candice LeRae against Ripley, Bianca Belair, Iyo Sky, Bayley and Naomi in a WarGames match in a losing effort, with Morgan being pinned by Ripley. Bálor and McDonagh lost the tag titles to The War Raiders (Erik and Ivar) on the December 16 episode of Raw while Morgan lost the women's title to Ripley at the Raw premiere on Netflix on January 6.

On the January 27 episode of Raw, Dominik and McDonagh failed to regain the titles from The War Raiders. During the match, McDonagh suffered an injury after he attempted a moonsault to the outside but his body bounced off the announce table. Despite finishing the match, McDonagh later revealed he had suffered broken ribs and a punctured lung, putting him out of action for a couple of months. On the February 24 episode of Raw, Morgan and Rodriguez defeated Belair and Naomi to win the WWE Women's Tag Team Championship after interference from Dominik. With this victory, The Judgment Day became the first faction to have won both men's and women's tag team titles.

Over the next few months, both Bálor and Dominik began to pursue the Intercontinental Championship as tensions between them increased. On Night 2 of WrestleMania 41 on April 20, Dominik won the title from Bron Breakker in a fatal four-way match that also involved Penta and Bálor, with Dominik pinning Bálor after a frog splash while Morgan and Rodriguez lost the tag titles to Lyra Valkyria and the returning Lynch, ending their reign at 55 days. The next night on Raw, Morgan and Rodriguez regained the titles from Lynch and Valkyria in a rematch while Dominik successfully defended his title against Penta after an assist from Carlito and the returning McDonagh. At Backlash on May 10, Dominik defeated Penta in a rematch to retain his title. Around the same time, Balor started bringing Roxanne Perez in as an associate, furthering tension within the group. In June 2025, Carlito’s contract with WWE expired and he was quietly removed from the stable. On the June 16 episode of Raw, Morgan suffered a legitimate dislocated shoulder during a match against Kairi Sane which required surgery, ruling Morgan out of action for several months.

On the June 30 episode of Raw, Bálor and McDonagh defeated The New Day (Kofi Kingston and Xavier Woods) to win the World Tag Team Championship for the second time as a team and Perez was formally added to the group, officially replacing Morgan as Women's Tag Team Champion, thus becoming an all champions group once again (Intercontinental, Women's Tag and World Tag Team Titles). At Evolution, the newly-formed duo defended their title in a fatal four-way tag team match against Charlotte Flair and Alexa Bliss, Sol Ruca and Zaria, and The Kabuki Warriors. On Night 1 of SummerSlam on August 2, Perez and Rodriguez lost the tag titles to Flair and Bliss, ending their reign at 33 days.

On the October 20 episode of Raw, Bálor and McDonagh lost the tag titles to AJ Styles and Dragon Lee, ending their second reign at 112 days. On the November 10 episode of Raw, Dominik lost the Intercontinental Championship to John Cena, ending his reign at 204 days. 19 days later at Survivor Series: WarGames, Dominik defeated Cena to regain the title after interference from the returning Morgan.

At Royal Rumble on January 31, 2026, Morgan, Perez and Rodriguez participated in the namesake match. Perez was eliminated by Ripley while Rodriguez was eliminated by Morgan, who went on to win the match by last eliminating Tiffany Stratton. On February 18, Perez announced that she had undergone surgery for a benign tumor in her back and would be out for an undisclosed period of time. Five days later on Raw, Morgan declared that she would challenge Stephanie Vaquer for the Women’s World Championship at WrestleMania 42, who Rodriguez unsuccessfully challenged previously. On the March 2 episode of Raw, Dominik lost the Intercontinental Championship to Penta after Bálor stopped McDonagh from helping him, ending his second reign at 93 days. On the following episode of Raw, Bálor was attacked by the rest of the group, ending his time in The Judgment Day. At WrestleMania 42, Morgan defeated Vaquer to win the title, while "The Demon" Finn Bálor defeated Mysterio in a street fight.

After defeating McDonagh in subsequent matches, Bálor was moved to SmackDown, ending their feud. After this, all remaining members sans McDonagh took part in the King and Queen of the Ring tournaments, with Morgan reaching the final, where she lost to Iyo Sky, who immediately challenged for her world title at Summerslam. During the tournament, the faction unsuccessfully tried to pay Danhausen to curse Mysterio's opponent, Oba Femi. However, Danhausen stole the money and subsequently cursed most members of the stable, leading to Mysterio challenging him for a match with the $100000 he stole on the line, also at SummerSlam. On the July 27 episode of Raw, Rodriguez defeated Sol Ruca to win the WWE Women's Intercontinental Championship. At SummerSlam, Morgan successfully retained her title against Sky, while Mysterio lost to Danhausen. At a live event in Santiago, Chile on September 12, Morgan lost the Women's World Championship back to Vaquer after interference from guest referee Becky Lynch, ending her reign at 147 days. At Money in the Bank on October 10, Morgan regained her title in a triple threat match against Vaquer and Lynch. At Crown Jewel on November 7, Morgan lost to WWE Women's Champion Chelsea Green for the Crown Jewel Championship. On the November 16 episode of Raw, Rodriguez lost the WWE Women’s Intercontinental Championship to Iyo Sky ending her reign at 112 days.

=== Lucha Libre AAA Worldwide (2025–present) ===
When Lucha Libre AAA Worldwide (AAA) was acquired by WWE in April 2025, multiple members of the faction began making appearances at their events, notably Triplemanía XXXIII and Worlds Collide: Las Vegas. Most prominently, after failing to win the title at the former, at the latter event on September 12, Mysterio defeated El Hijo del Vikingo to win the AAA Mega Championship, becoming a double champion as well as the first wrestler to hold championships in WWE and AAA simultaneously. At Rey de Reyes, Mysterio defeated Vikingo in a Luchas de Apuestas match with his AAA career on the line, barring Vikingo from challenging for the title as long as he remains champion. Also starting in 2025, Mysterio started a shaky alliance with El Grande Americano (Note: In the beginning, the character was portrayed by Chad Gable, but he was replaced by Ludwig Kaiser after he got injured.) as Los Gringos Locos 2.0. Americano and his Los Americanos faction helped Judgment Day and Mysterio on several occasions, only to be repeatedly spurned by the latter. At Triplemanía 34, Mysterio lost his Mega Championship to Americano despite interference from McDonagh, Morgan as well as his El Ojo faction, ending his reign at 366 days. At the same event, Perez won a fatal four-way match to earn a AAA Reina de Reinas Championship match at Worlds Collide, which she lost. At Héroes Inmortales on October 24, Mysterio failed to regain the title from Americano after interference from Rey Mysterio.

=== World Wrestling Council (2025) ===
On May 31, 2025, Carlito returned to World Wrestling Council (WWC) at Summer Madness, where he defeated Ray González to win the WWC Puerto Rico Heavyweight Championship. However, in June 2025, Carlito’s contract with WWE expired. He was quietly removed from the stable and vacated the title later that month.

== Members ==
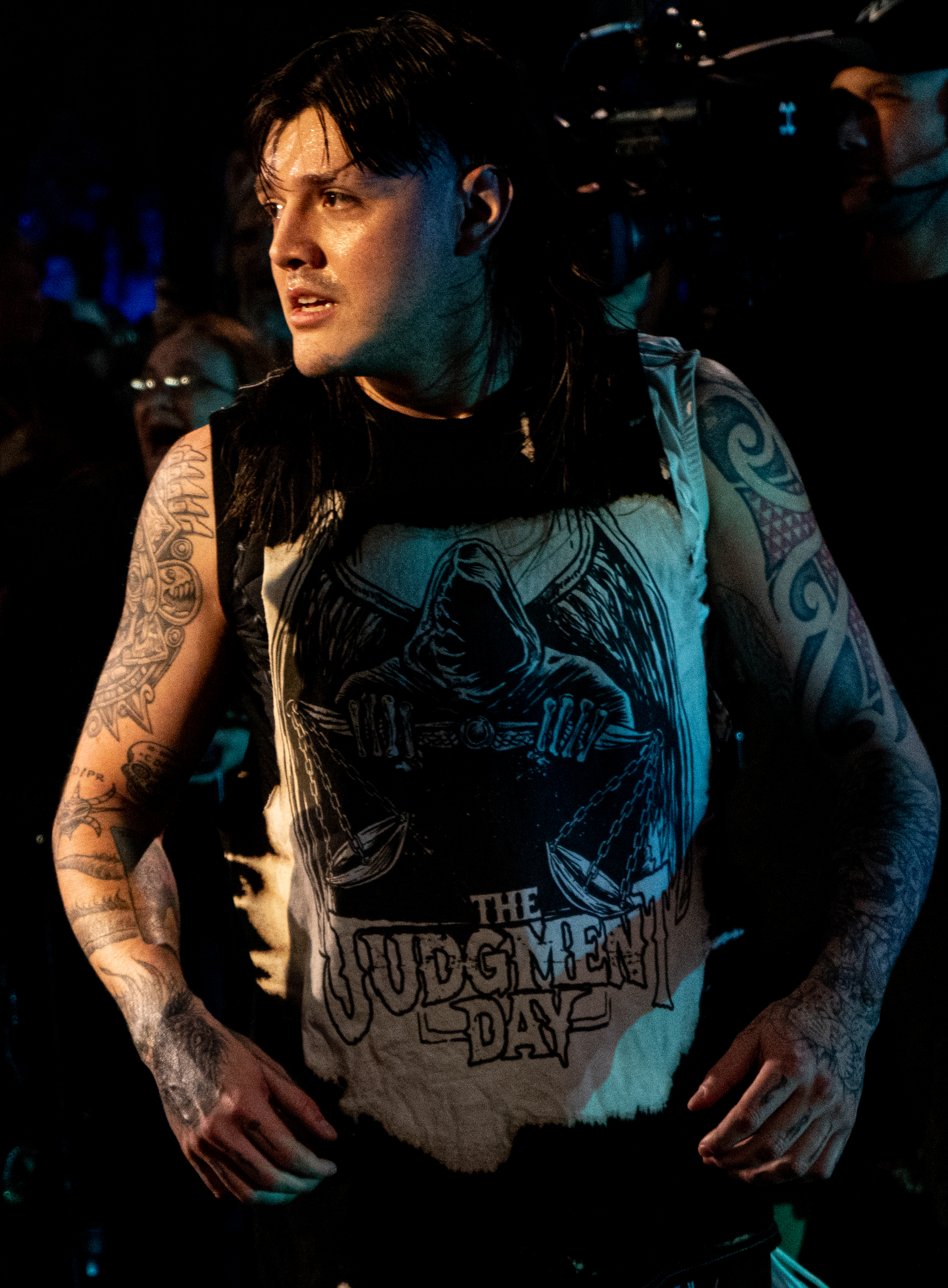
Dominik Mysterio

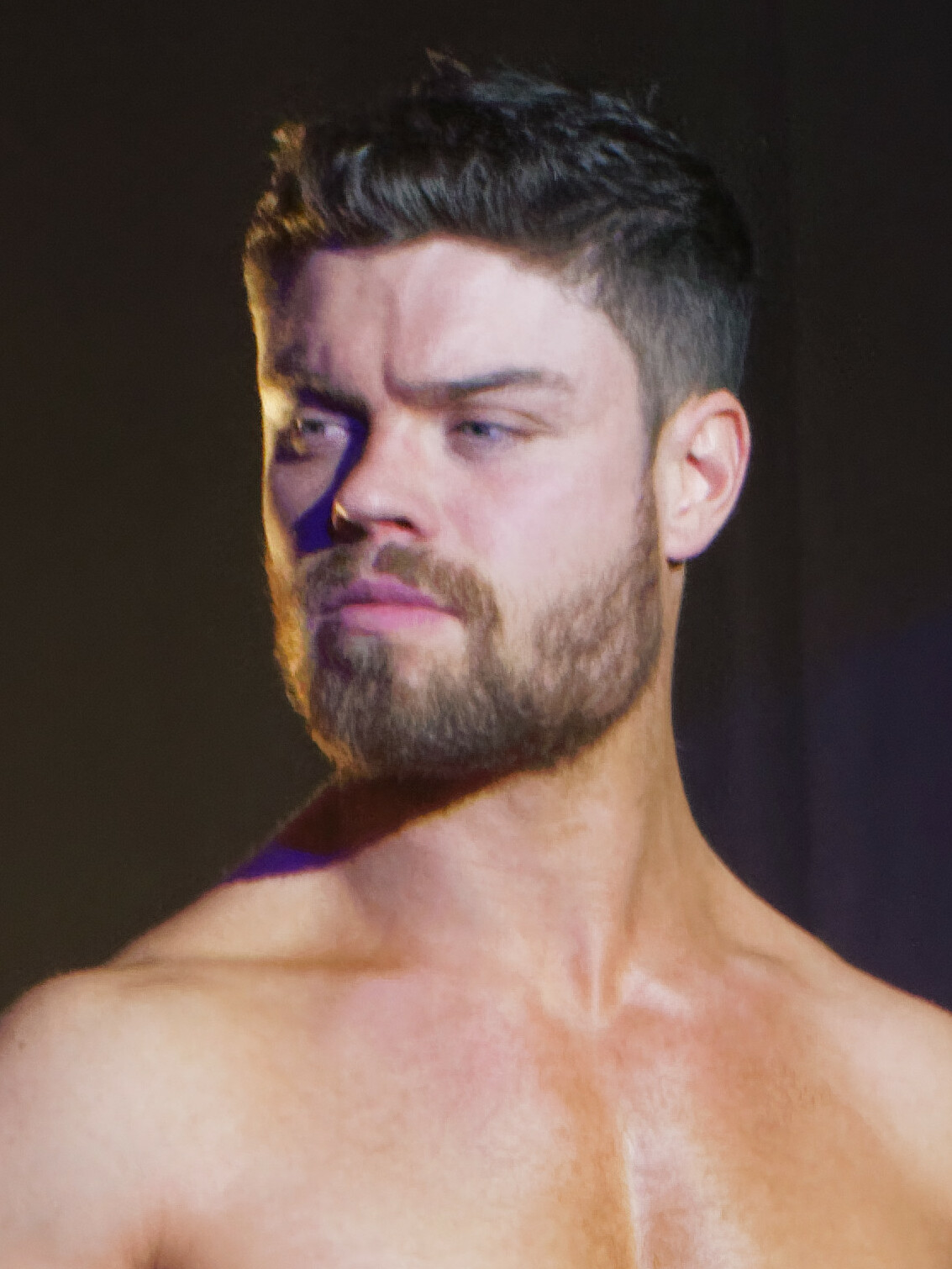
JD McDonagh

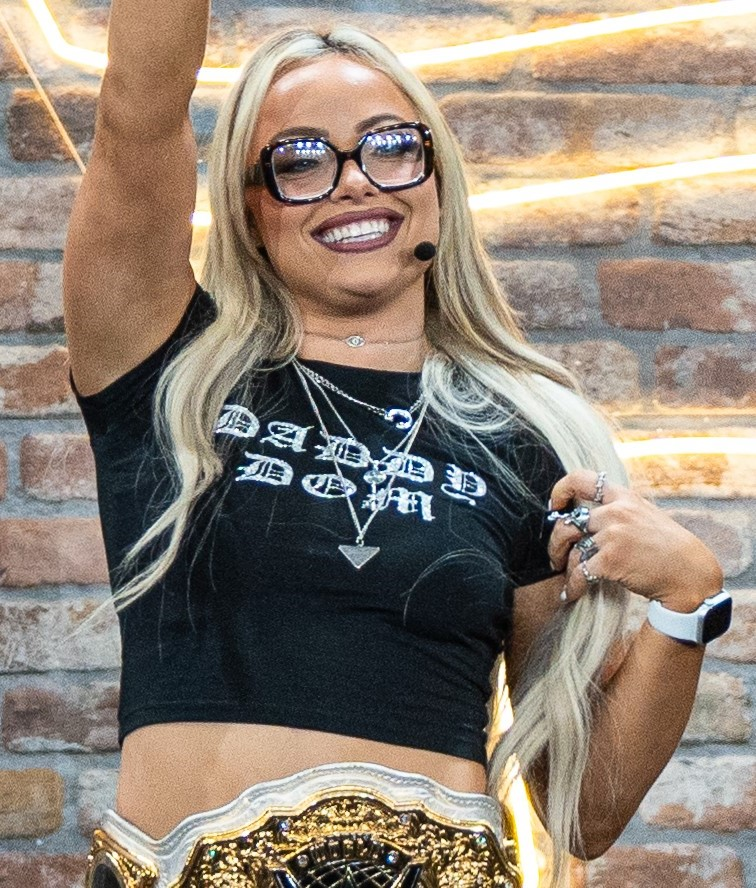
Liv Morgan

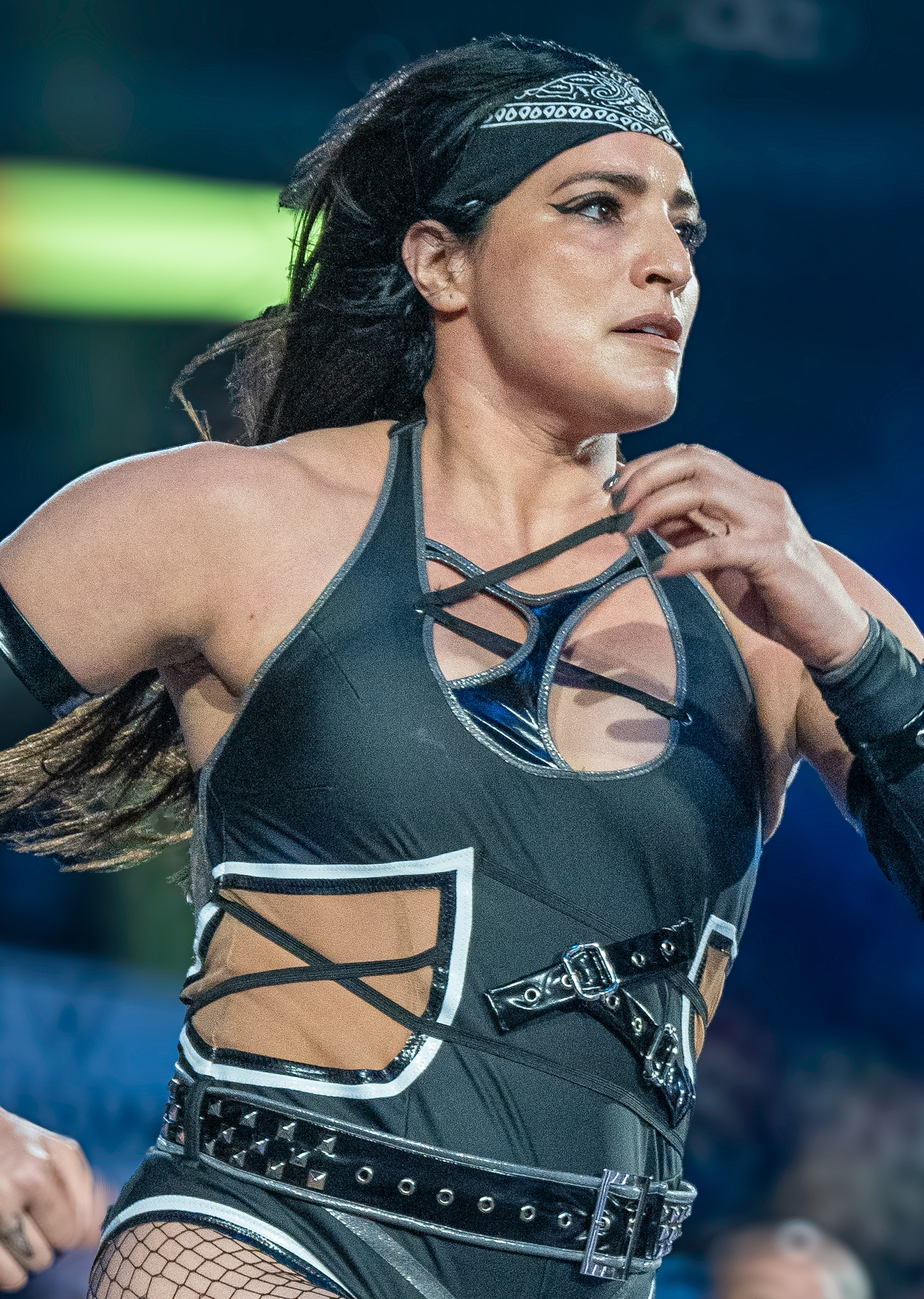
Raquel Rodriguez

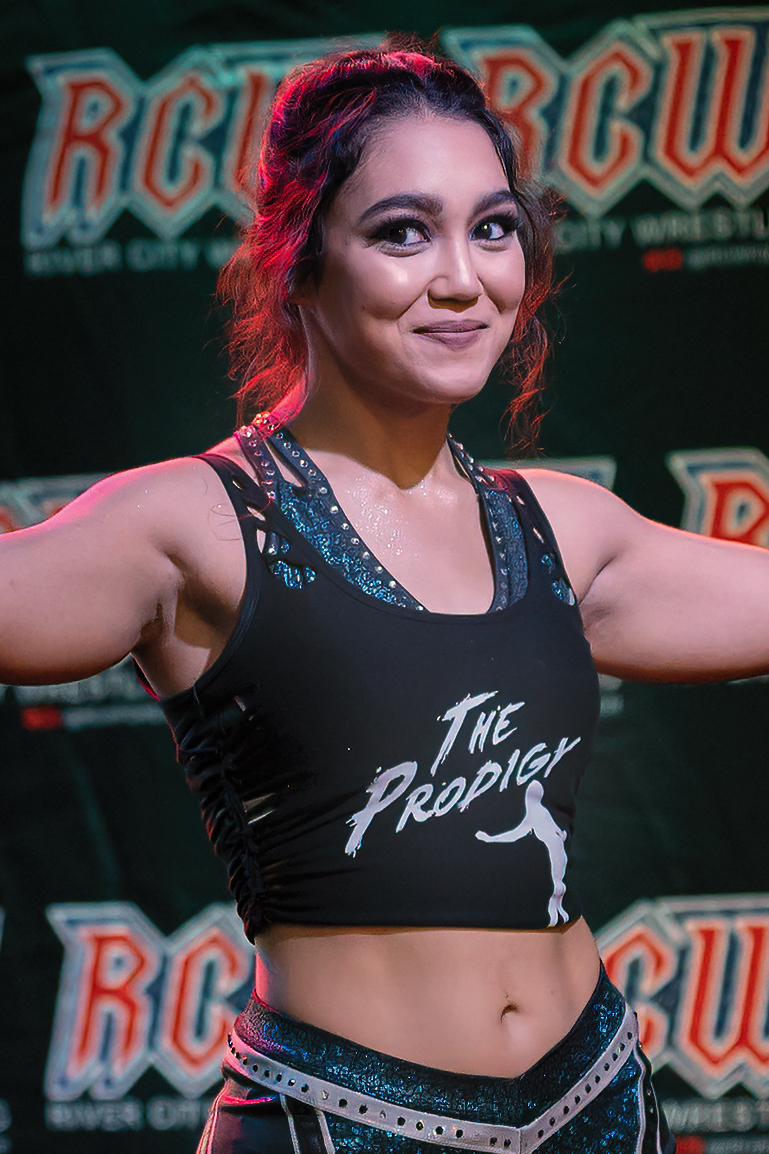
Roxanne Perez

*	Founding member(s)
L	Leader

=== Current ===
Members	Joined
Dominik Mysterio	September 5, 2022
JD McDonagh	November 13, 2023
Liv Morgan	August 5, 2024
Raquel Rodriguez	October 5, 2024
Roxanne Perez	June 30, 2025

=== Former ===
Members		Joined	Left
Edge	*L	April 3, 2022	June 6, 2022
Damian Priest	*	April 3, 2022	August 3, 2024
Rhea Ripley		May 8, 2022	August 3, 2024
Carlito		August 5, 2024	June 14, 2025
Finn Bálor		June 6, 2022	March 9, 2026

== Sub-groups ==
Affiliate	Members	Tenure	Type
Liv Morgan and Raquel Rodriguez	Liv Morgan; Raquel Rodriguez	2024–present	Tag team

== Championships and accomplishments ==
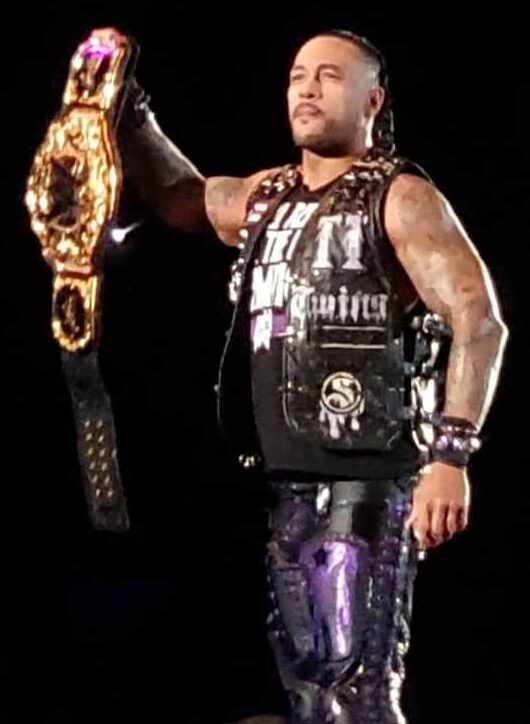
As part of The Judgment Day, Damian Priest won the World Heavyweight Championship...

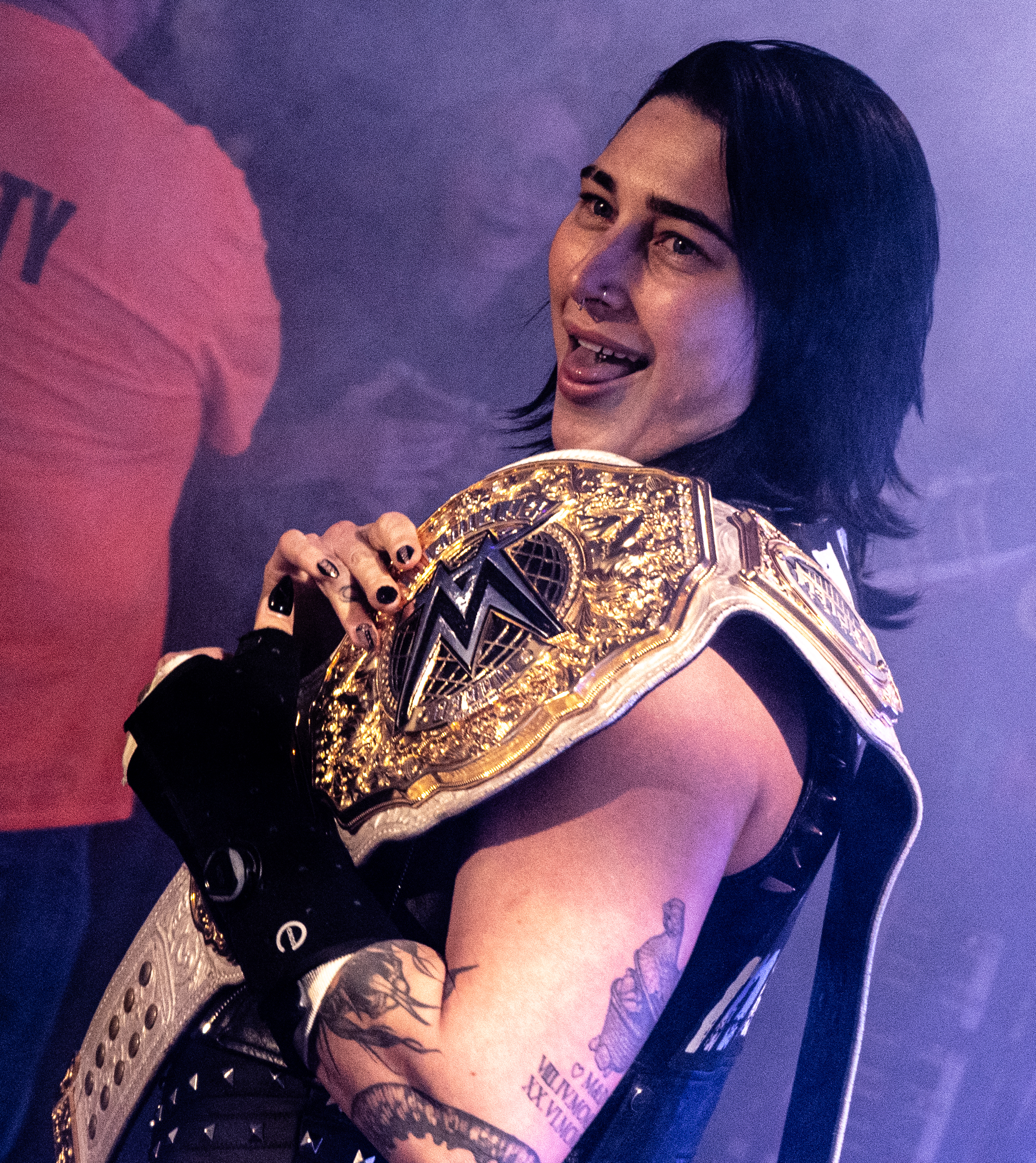
...and Rhea Ripley won the Women's World Championship...

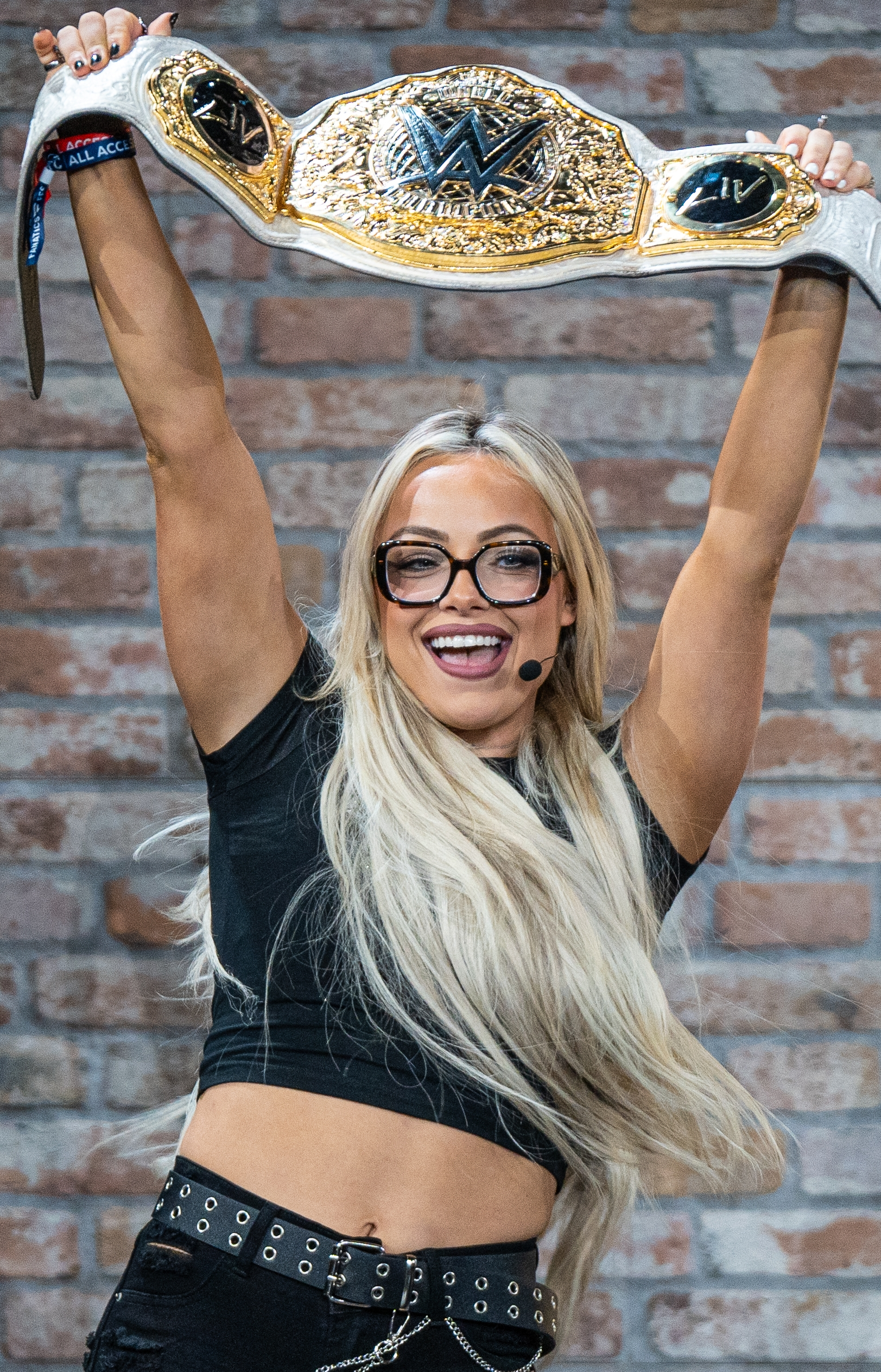
...while Morgan has brought the title to the group three times.

- ESPN
  - Female Wrestler of the Year (2023) – Ripley
  - Male Wrestler of the Year (2025) – Mysterio
- Lucha Libre AAA Worldwide
  - AAA Mega Championship (1 time) – Mysterio
- New York Post
  - Faction of the Year (2023, 2024)
- Pro Wrestling Illustrated
  - Faction of the Year (2023)
  - Match of the Year (2023) Ripley vs. Charlotte Flair at WrestleMania 39
  - Most Hated Wrestler of the Year (2023, 2024) – Mysterio
  - Woman of the Year (2023) – Ripley
  - Comeback of the Year (2024) – Morgan
  - Ranked Ripley No. 1 of the top 250 women's singles wrestlers in the PWI Women's 250 in 2023
  - Ranked Bálor No. 61 of the top 500 singles wrestlers in the PWI 500 in 2023
  - Ranked Priest No. 71 of the top 500 singles wrestlers in the PWI 500 in 2023
  - Ranked Mysterio No. 94 of the top 500 singles wrestlers in the PWI 500 in 2023
- World Wrestling Council
  - WWC Puerto Rico Heavyweight Championship (1 time) – Carlito
- Wrestling Observer Newsletter
  - Women's Wrestling MVP (2023) – Ripley
- WWE
  - World Heavyweight Championship (1 time) – Priest
  - Women's World Championship (Note: Ripley won the title as the WWE SmackDown Women's Championship. The title was renamed on June 12, 2023.) (4 times, current) – Ripley (1), Morgan (3, current) (Note: During her first reign as a member, Morgan won the title prior to officially joining the group.)
  - WWE Intercontinental Championship (2 times) – Mysterio
  - WWE Women's Intercontinental Championship (1 time) – Rodriguez
  - NXT North American Championship (2 times) – Mysterio
  - World Tag Team Championship (Note: During Bálor and Priest’s reigns, the title was known as the Raw Tag Team Championship.) (4 times) – Bálor and Priest (2), Bálor and McDonagh (2)
  - WWE SmackDown Tag Team Championship (2 times) – Bálor and Priest
  - WWE Women's Tag Team Championship (3 times) – Morgan and Rodriguez (2), Perez and Rodriguez (1) (Note: During Morgan and Rodriguez's second reign, Morgan suffered an injury and was replaced by Roxanne Perez. WWE recognizes Rodriguez and Perez’s reign as a separate reign.)
  - WWE Women's Crown Jewel Championship (2024) – Morgan
  - Women's Royal Rumble – Ripley (2023), Morgan (2026)
  - Men's Money in the Bank (2023) – Priest
  - Seventh Women's Triple Crown Champion – Ripley
  - Fifth Women's Grand Slam Champion – Ripley
  - 17th Grand Slam Champion (under current format; 24th overall) – Bálor
  - Slammy Award (6 times)
    - Faction of the Year (2024)
    - Female Superstar of the Year (2024) – Ripley
    - Match of the Year (2024) – Rhea Ripley vs. Charlotte Flair for the WWE SmackDown Women's Championship at WrestleMania 39
    - Villain of the Year (2024) – Mysterio
    - Female Superstar of the Year (2025) – Morgan
    - Villain of the Year (2025) – Morgan and Mysterio
