= Rhea Ripley =

Australian professional wrestler (born 1996)

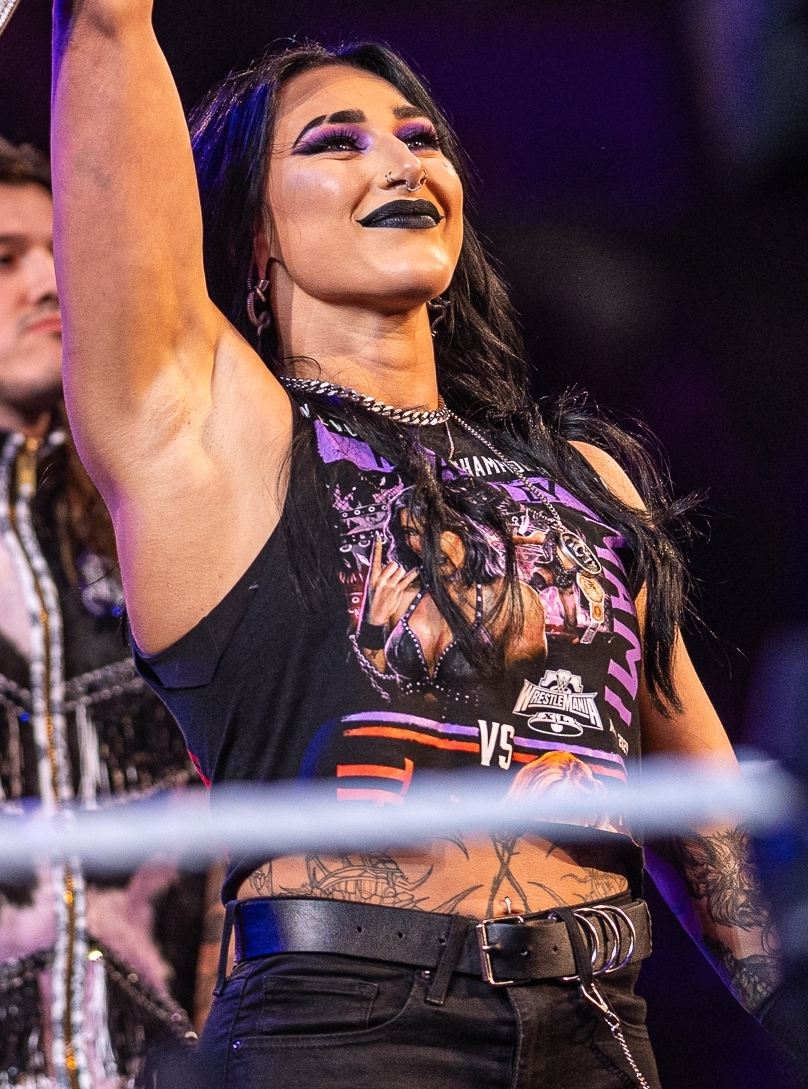
- Ripley in 2024

Personal information
- Born: Demiti Bennett; 11 October 1996 (age 30) Adelaide, South Australia, Australia
- Spouse: Buddy Matthews (m. 2024)

Professional wrestling career
- Ring name(s): Demi Bennett; Rhea Ripley
- Billed height: 5 ft 7 in (170 cm)
- Billed from: Adelaide, South Australia
- Trained by: WWE Performance Center
- Debut: 22 June 2013

Demiti Bennett (born 11 October 1996) is an Australian professional wrestler. As of July 2017, she is signed to WWE, where she performs on the SmackDown brand under the ring name Rhea Ripley. She is a former two-time Women's World Champion and a two-time WWE Women's Champion. Ripley's first reign as Women's World Champion is tied with Bayley as the longest in the title's history at 380 days.

After competing on the independent circuit under her real name since 2013, Ripley joined WWE and participated in the inaugural Mae Young Classic in 2017. After reaching the semi-finals of the 2018 edition of the tournament, she was part of the original roster of NXT UK, becoming the inaugural NXT UK Women's Champion in August 2018. After a run on the NXT brand from 2019 to 2021, which saw her win the NXT Women's Championship and become the brand's first member to defend an NXT title at WrestleMania, WWE's flagship event, she was promoted to the main roster on Raw where she joined The Judgment Day in 2022.

In addition to the NXT UK Women's Championship and NXT Women's Championship, she is a former two-time WWE Women's Tag Team Champion (with Nikki A.S.H. and Iyo Sky, respectively). After winning the SmackDown Women's Championship in April 2023—which was renamed as Women's World Championship that June—she became the seventh WWE Women's Triple Crown Champion and fifth WWE Women's Grand Slam Champion, as well as the only wrestler to have held all five of these titles. She is also the first female Australian champion in WWE history. Ripley was the 2023 Women's Royal Rumble winner, becoming the fourth wrestler and the first woman to win a Royal Rumble match as the number one entrant.

== Early life ==
Demiti Bennett was born on 11 October 1996 in Adelaide, South Australia. She is of Italian descent through her mother's side. Bennett grew up in the beachside Adelaide suburb of Glenelg and attended Henley High School throughout her teenage years. She played association football in her youth before becoming a professional wrestler.

== Professional wrestling career ==
=== Early career (2013–2017) ===
Bennett debuted in Riot City Wrestling on 22 June 2013 at the age of 16. She spent several years in the promotion, where she became a two-time RCW Women's Champion. Bennett made her New Horizon Pro Wrestling debut on 24 May 2014 during the opening night of the NHPW Global Conflict where she joined the Global Conflict Tournament. She was eliminated during the first round of the tournament by Mercedes Martinez. She returned for the second night of the NHPW Global Conflict event, competing in a four-way mixed tag team match paired with Garry Schmidt. Six months later, Bennett was part of the opening night of the NHPW Final Chapter event, wrestling a four-way match against Madison Eagles, Evie and Saraya Knight for the vacant IndyGurlz Australia Championship, but was unsuccessful.

Bennett made her Melbourne City Wrestling debut on 14 June 2014 at MCW New Horizons where she defended the RCW Women's Championship in a three-way match against Savannah Summers and Toni Storm. On 9 August at MCW Clash Of The Titans, Bennett defeated Miami to retain her championship. On 22 April 2017, Bennett wrestled her last RCW match at RCW Strength where she successfully defended the title against Kellyanne.

From April to June 2015, Bennett toured Japan, wrestling for Pro Wrestling Zero1, Reina Joshi Puroresu, Sendai Girls' Pro Wrestling, and World Woman Pro-Wrestling Diana. She wrestled the first bout of her tour on 5 April at Diana's 4th Anniversary Show in Tokyo's Korakuen Hall, losing to Kyoko Kimura, and the last match of her tour on 23 June, defeating Konami in a bout for Reina in Tokyo.

=== WWE (2017–present) ===
==== Mae Young Classic (2017–2018) ====
In 2017, Bennett signed with WWE, and it was announced that she would compete in the inaugural Mae Young Classic under the new name "Rhea Ripley". Bennett came up with the ring name while mixing and matching possible names, settling on Rhea from the Greek goddess of the same name, and Ripley after Ellen Ripley from the Alien film franchise. She defeated Miranda Salinas in the first round but lost to Dakota Kai in the second round. Ripley made her NXT television debut on 25 October 2017 episode of NXT, participating in a battle royal to determine one of the contenders for the vacant NXT Women's Championship at TakeOver: WarGames on 18 November, which was won by Nikki Cross. Sporting a new look, Ripley competed in the 2018 Mae Young Classic, displaying a new aggressive and disrespectful attitude. She defeated MJ Jenkins, Kacy Catanzaro, and Tegan Nox in her first three matches but lost to Io Shirai in the semi-finals.

==== Inaugural NXT UK Women's Champion (2018–2019) ====
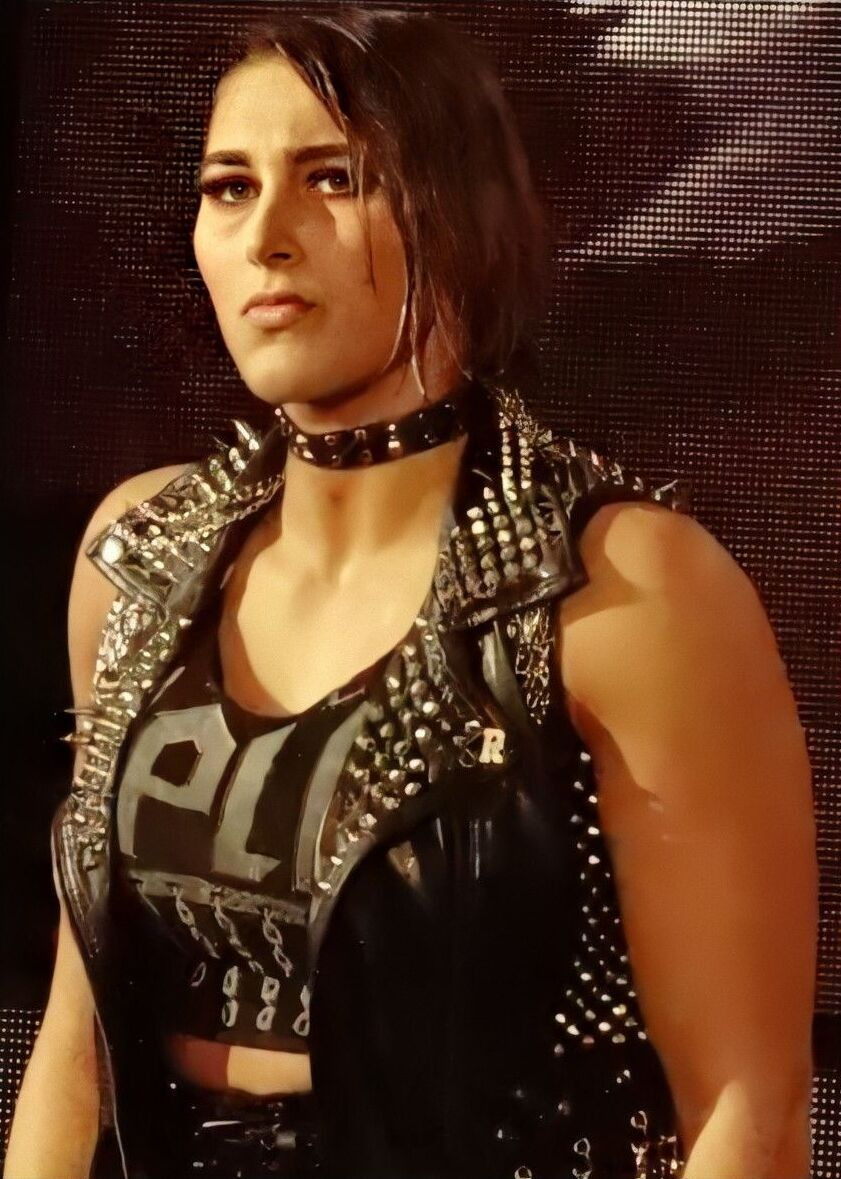
Ripley in April 2019

Shortly after the 2018 Mae Young Classic, Ripley became part of the NXT UK brand as part of the premiere of the newly created NXT UK show. During the television tapings of the show in August (that aired throughout November), Ripley took part in an eight-woman tournament to determine the inaugural NXT UK Women's Champion. She defeated Xia Brookside in the first round, Dakota Kai in the semi-finals, and Toni Storm in the finals to become the inaugural champion. With the win, Ripley became the first female Australian champion in WWE history and the second Australian champion after Buddy Murphy. Ripley also competed in a dark match before the first ever all women's pay–per–view, Evolution, on 28 October, where she successfully defended her title against Kai (due to the tournament having yet to air at the time, she was not yet recognized on-screen as champion). Throughout her reign, Ripley went on to fend off title contenders such as Isla Dawn and Deonna Purrazzo.

On 12 January 2019 at NXT UK TakeOver: Blackpool, Ripley lost the title to Storm, ending her reign at 139 days and marking her first defeat in the brand. At Royal Rumble on 27 January, Ripley made her first appearance on a main roster pay-per-view by entering the women's Royal Rumble match at number 24, eliminating Kacy Catanzaro, Dana Brooke, and Zelina Vega before being eliminated by Bayley. Afterwards, Ripley feuded with the debuting Piper Niven for the remainder of the year over which one was the most dominant woman in the NXT UK roster. The two traded victories with each other before teaming up after Ripley saved Niven from an attack by Jazzy Gabert and Jinny, whom they defeated in a tag team match on 4 October. Ripley wrestled her last match in the brand on 5 October 2019 tapings of NXT UK, defeating Nina Samuels.

==== NXT Women's Champion (2019–2021) ====
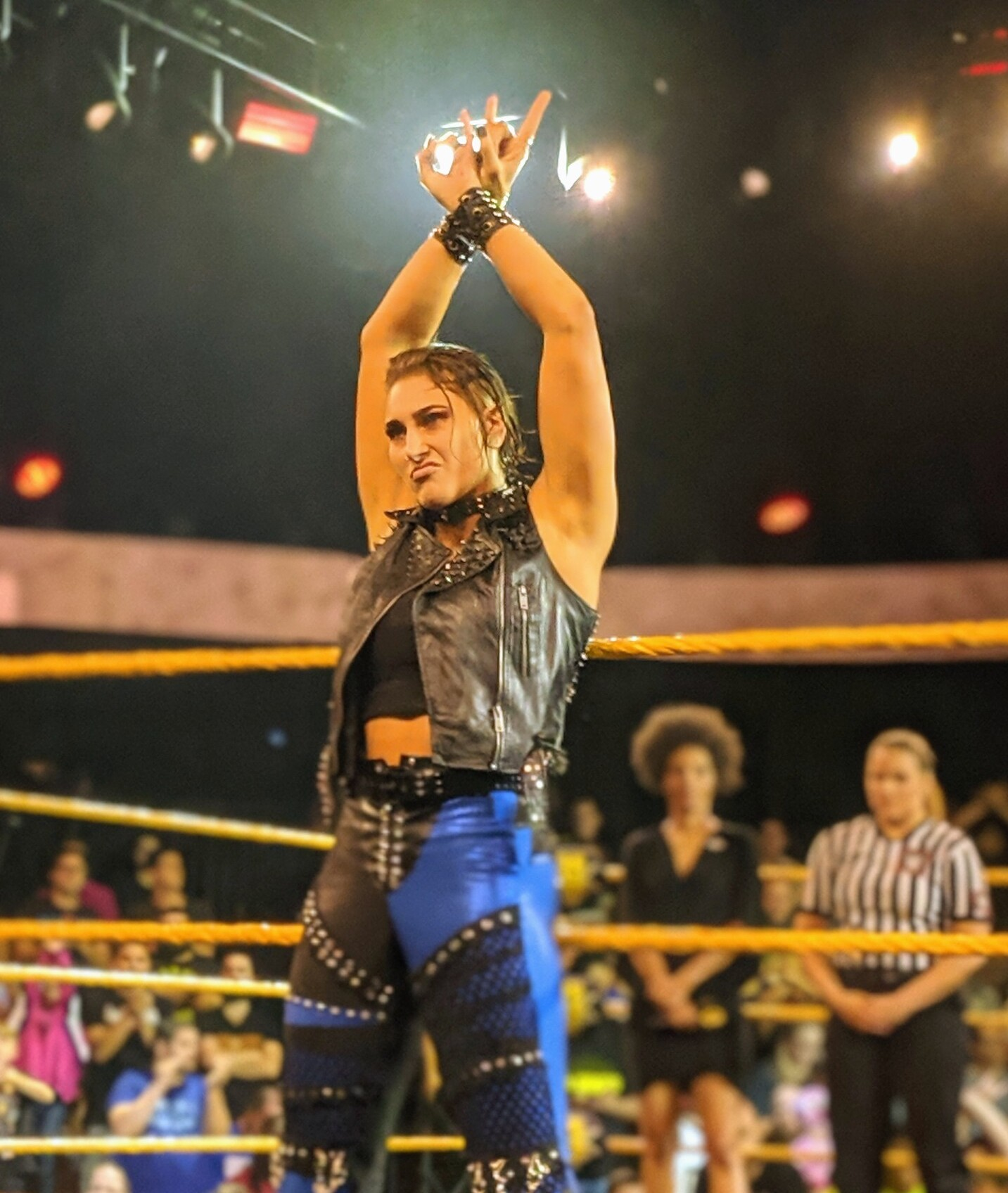
Ripley performing her signature hand gesture in September 2019

On 28 August 2019 episode of NXT, Ripley made her surprise return to the brand when she interrupted NXT Women's Champion Shayna Baszler, stating that Baszler may have beaten everyone on NXT, but not her, turning face and beginning a feud between the two in the process. In parallel to her feud against Baszler, on 1 November episode of SmackDown, Ripley and Tegan Nox were one of the many NXT wrestlers to invade the show, challenging Mandy Rose and Sonya Deville to a tag team match which Ripley and Nox won. Later that night, Ripley joined Triple H and the rest of the NXT roster as they declared war on both Raw and SmackDown, and vowed to win the 2019 Survivor Series brand warfare. As part of the ongoing storyline, she defeated both Raw's Charlotte Flair and SmackDown's Sasha Banks in a triple threat match on 22 November episode of SmackDown.

At TakeOver: WarGames on 23 November, Ripley led Team Ripley in the first ever women's WarGames match against Team Baszler (Baszler, Io Shirai, Bianca Belair, and NXT UK Women's Champion Kay Lee Ray); despite teammate Dakota Kai turning heel and attacking Nox before the two entered the match, leaving Ripley and Candice LeRae in a de facto two-on-four handicap match, Ripley gave her team the victory by pinning Baszler. The following night at Survivor Series, Ripley was part of Team NXT, who defeated Team Raw and Team SmackDown, and the leader of her team in the 5-on-5-on-5 women's elimination match, which her team won after she last eliminated SmackDown captain Sasha Banks, with she, LeRae and Shirai as the survivors.

On 18 December episode of NXT, Ripley defeated Baszler to win the NXT Women's Championship, making her the first person to have won both the NXT Women's and NXT UK Women's Championships. She then successfully defended the title against Toni Storm on 25 January 2020 at Worlds Collide.

Ripley appeared on 3 February 2020 episode of Raw, confronting Royal Rumble winner Charlotte Flair and suggesting that Flair should use her Royal Rumble title opportunity to challenge Ripley for the NXT Women's Championship at WrestleMania 36. Flair appeared on the following episode of NXT to give her answer, but was interrupted by both Bianca Belair and Ripley, with the two attacking Flair. At TakeOver: Portland on 16 February, Ripley successfully defended the title against Belair; after the match she was attacked by Flair, who accepted Ripley's challenge. Ripley lost the title to Flair on Night 2 of WrestleMania 36 on 5 April, after which she took a hiatus from WWE and returned to Australia due to her visa issues. Ripley returned on 6 May episode of NXT, attacking Flair after she got herself disqualified in an NXT Women's Championship match against Shirai. On 7 June at TakeOver: In Your House, Ripley and Flair both lost to Shirai in a triple threat match for the NXT Women's Championship. Ripley also failed to win the title from Shirai on 18 November episode of NXT.

On 6 December at NXT TakeOver: WarGames, Ripley was a part of Shotzi Blackheart's team alongside Shirai and Ember Moon for the second ever women's WarGames match, but they lost to LeRae, Dakota Kai, Raquel González and Toni Storm. At New Year's Evil on 6 January 2021, Ripley lost to González in a Last Woman Standing match, which was her final match in NXT. On 31 January, at Royal Rumble, Ripley entered the titular match at number 14 and scored 7 eliminations but was the last competitor eliminated by eventual winner Bianca Belair.

==== Raw Women's Champion (2021–2022) ====
On 22 February episode of Raw, a video package aired hyping up Ripley's arrival to the brand. Ripley made her main roster debut on 22 March episode of Raw, challenging Asuka for the Raw Women's Championship at WrestleMania 37. At Night 2 of WrestleMania 37 on 11 April, Ripley defeated Asuka to win the title. On the following episode of Raw, Ripley defended the title in a rematch against Asuka, which ended in a no-contest after interference from Charlotte Flair, who attacked both Asuka and Ripley. On 3 May episode of Raw, a rematch between Ripley and Asuka for the Raw Women's Championship was scheduled for WrestleMania Backlash on 16 May, but WWE official Sonya Deville added Flair to the match to make it a triple threat match; Ripley retained the title by pinning Asuka. At Hell in a Cell on 20 June, Flair defeated Ripley by disqualification, thus Ripley retained her title. At Money in the Bank on 18 July, Ripley dropped the title to Flair, ending her first reign at 98 days. She failed to regain the title in a triple threat match against the champion Nikki A. S. H. and Flair at SummerSlam on 21 August.

On 20 September episode of Raw, Ripley and A. S. H. defeated Natalya and Tamina to win the WWE Women's Tag Team Championship. They successfully defended the titles in a rematch on 4 October episode of Raw before losing them to Carmella and Queen Zelina on 22 November episode of Raw, ending their reign at 63 days. Their partnership ended on 10 January 2022 episode of Raw when A. S. H. attacked Ripley. At Royal Rumble on 29 January, Ripley entered at number 16, eliminating Zelina, Carmella, and Ivory before being eliminated by Flair. She then competed in the women's Elimination Chamber match at the titular event on 19 February, eliminating A. S. H. before being eliminated by Belair.

In March, Ripley began teaming with Liv Morgan, challenging for the titles in a fatal four-way tag team match on Night 2 of WrestleMania 38 on 3 April in a losing effort. After failing to win the titles from new champions Sasha Banks and Naomi on 18 April episode of Raw, Ripley attacked Morgan, ending their partnership and turning heel.

==== The Judgment Day and Women's World Champion (2022–2024) ====
At WrestleMania Backlash on 8 May, Ripley cost AJ Styles his match against Edge and was revealed as a member of The Judgment Day. At Hell in a Cell on 5 June, The Judgment Day (Edge, Damian Priest, and Ripley) defeated Styles, Finn Bálor, and Liv Morgan in a six-person mixed tag team match. The next night on Raw, Edge introduced Bálor as the newest member of The Judgment Day; Bálor, Priest, and Ripley suddenly attacked Edge, kicking him out of the stable. Later that night, Ripley won a fatal four-way match to become the number one contender for Bianca Belair's Raw Women's Championship at Money in the Bank on 2 July. However, she was pulled out of the match after being not medically cleared to compete and was replaced by Carmella.

The stable feuded with The Mysterios (composed of Rey and Dominik Mysterio) in an attempt to recruit Dominik into their ranks. After Dominik turned heel at Clash at the Castle on 3 September by attacking Edge and Rey, joining The Judgment Day, he took on a gimmick mirroring Eddie Guerrero's Latino Heat while together with Ripley, with Ripley calling herself Dominik's "Mami". On 8 October, at Extreme Rules, Dominik, Priest, and Ripley helped Bálor defeat Edge in an "I Quit" match. After the match, Ripley attacked Edge's wife, Beth Phoenix, with a con-chair-to. During the stable's feud with The O.C. (Styles, Luke Gallows, and Karl Anderson), The O.C. introduced the returning Mia Yim as their solution to counter Ripley. Ripley would temporarily ally herself with Damage CTRL in the leadup to Survivor Series WarGames on 26 November after Yim had joined the opposing team, but Ripley's team lost to Yim's team in a WarGames match after Becky Lynch pinned Dakota Kai. On the following episode of Raw, The Judgment Day defeated The O.C. in an eight-person mixed tag team match, ending their feud.

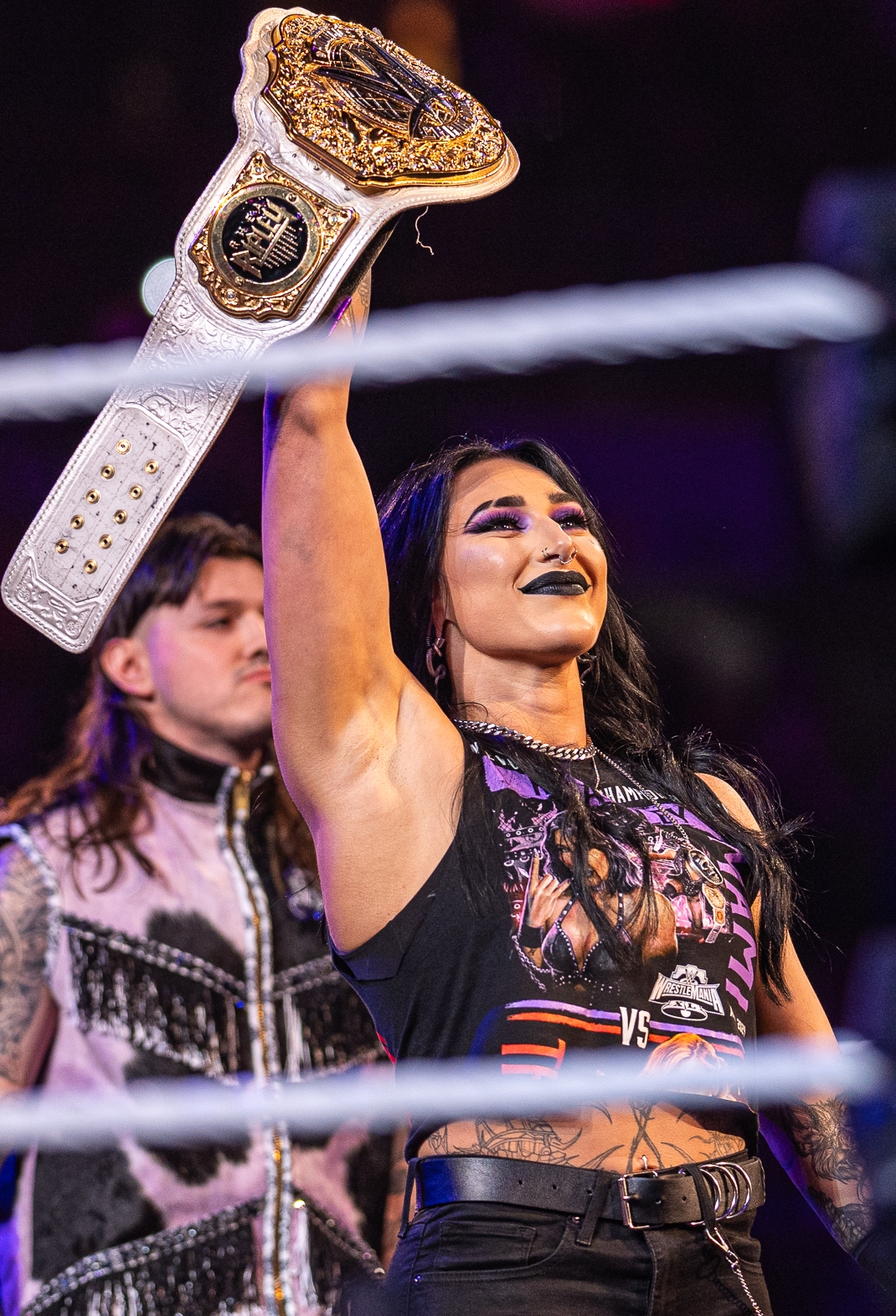
Ripley with the Women's World Championship in April 2024

At the Royal Rumble on 28 January 2023, Ripley appeared at ringside during the men's Royal Rumble match to assist her stablemates in their attack on Edge, only to be speared by Phoenix. Later that night, Ripley won the women's Royal Rumble match as the first entrant by last eliminating Liv Morgan, who entered the match at number 2. With this victory, Ripley became the fourth wrestler (after Shawn Michaels in 1995, Chris Benoit in 2004, and Edge in 2021) and the first woman to win the Royal Rumble as the first entrant. She also spent the longest time in a women's Royal Rumble match at 1:01:08; Morgan was officially recorded as lasting one second less. On the following episode of Raw, Ripley declared that she would challenge Charlotte Flair for the SmackDown Women's Championship at WrestleMania 39. On Night 1 of WrestleMania 39 on 1 April, Ripley defeated Flair to win the title. With this win, Ripley became the seventh Women's Triple Crown champion, the fifth Women's Grand Slam champion, and the youngest grand slam champion (male or female) in WWE history at 26.

At Backlash on 6 May, Ripley successfully defended the SmackDown Women's Championship in her first title defense against Zelina Vega. At Night of Champions on 27 May, Ripley retained the title against Natalya in a squash match that lasted 70 seconds. On 12 June episode of Raw, the SmackDown Women's Championship was renamed to the Women's World Championship and Ripley was presented a brand-new championship belt. On 3 July episode of Raw, Ripley defeated Natalya once again to retain the title. At Payback on 2 September, Ripley helped Bálor and Priest win the Undisputed WWE Tag Team Championship after spearing Kevin Owens through the barricade. Later that night, Ripley retained her title against Raquel Rodriguez after a distraction from Dominik. On 11 September episode of Raw, Ripley defeated Rodriguez in a rematch to retain the title after interference from the returning Nia Jax, who attacked Ripley after the match. At Crown Jewel on 4 November, Ripley defeated Jax, Rodriguez, Zoey Stark and Shayna Baszler, who Ripley pinned, to retain her title in a fatal five-way match. At Survivor Series WarGames on 25 November, Ripley defeated Stark to retain her title.

At Day 1 on 1 January 2024, Ripley defeated Ivy Nile to retain the title. On 24 February, at Elimination Chamber: Perth in her home country of Australia, Ripley successfully defended her title against Jax in the main event. On Night 1 of WrestleMania XL on 6 April, Ripley defeated Becky Lynch to retain the title.

==== Feud with Liv Morgan and Judgment Day's betrayal (2024–2025) ====
On 8 April episode of Raw, Ripley was attacked in a backstage segment by Liv Morgan, during which Ripley legitimately injured her right arm and was forced to vacate the championship the following week, ending her first reign at 380 days, tying Bayley's record as the longest-reigning Women's World Champion. During Ripley's absence, the storyline continued when Morgan began seducing Dominik, who resisted Morgan's efforts, but accidentally helped her win the Women's World Championship from Lynch at King and Queen of the Ring. Morgan also began interfering in The Judgment Day's matches to their advantage. After a three-month hiatus, Ripley returned on 8 July episode of Raw, confronting Morgan and Dominik.

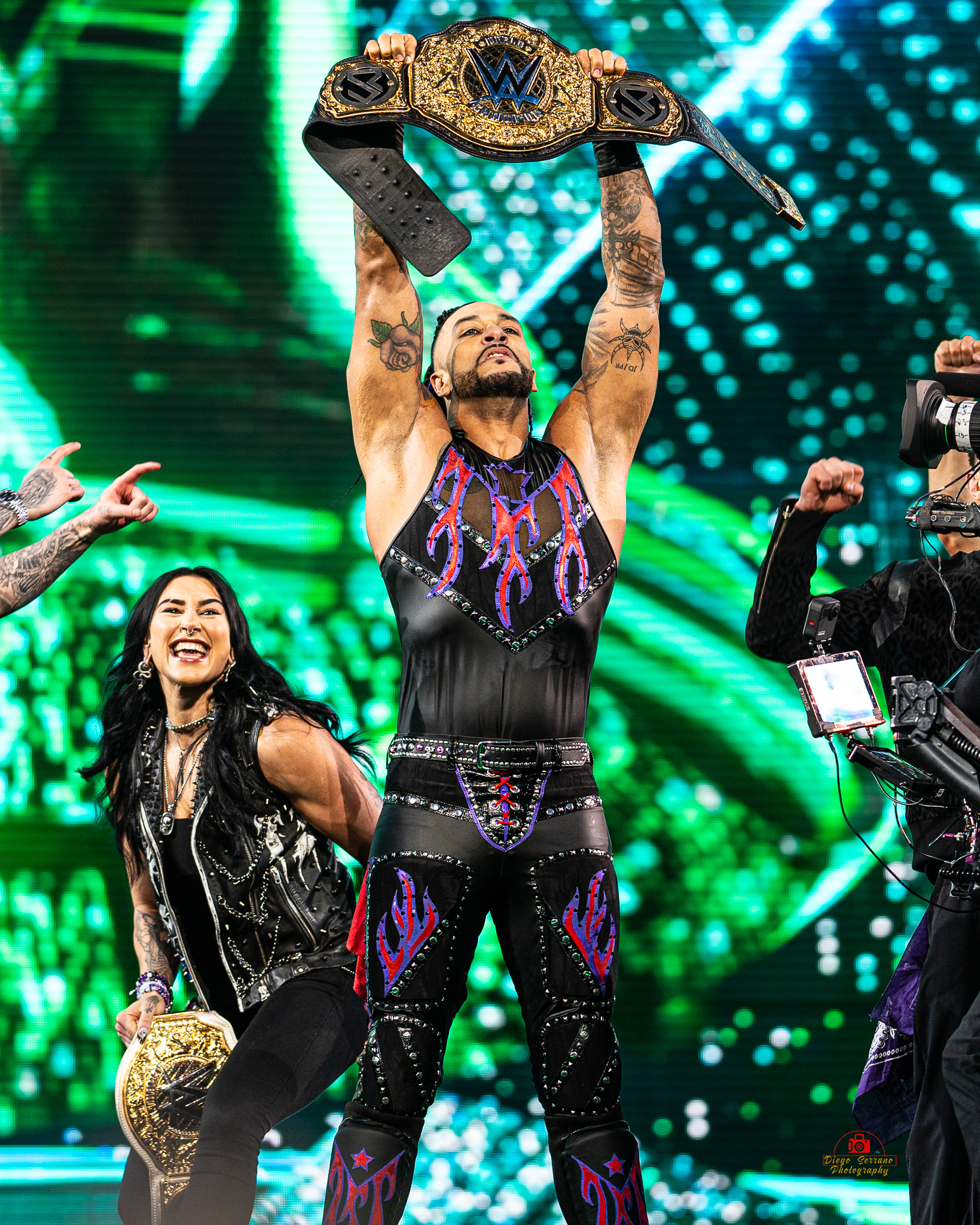
Ripley (left) with Damian Priest in April 2024

At SummerSlam on 3 August, Ripley was unsuccessful in regaining the title from Morgan after interference from Dominik, giving Ripley her first pinfall loss since May 2022. After the match, Dominik turned on Ripley and kissed Morgan, ending their partnership and fully turning Ripley face. On the following episode of Raw, Bálor officially kicked Priest and Ripley out of the group, and followed up with the introduction of the "new" Judgment Day, consisting of himself, Dominik, JD McDonagh, and the new additions of both Carlito (who became an associate member of the group during Ripley's hiatus now an official member) and Morgan. Later that night, during Priest's match against McDonagh, he was ambushed by Bálor and the rest of The Judgment Day, until Ripley came out to save him. Priest and Ripley would afterwards embrace each other, staying together as a team and going by their unofficial tag team name, the Terror Twins. At Bash in Berlin on 31 August, Ripley and Priest defeated Mysterio and Morgan despite interference from The Judgment Day, with Ripley pinning Morgan. At Bad Blood on 5 October, Ripley defeated Morgan by disqualification after being attacked by the returning Raquel Rodriguez. However, since championships do not change hands via disqualification or countout unless otherwise stipulated, Morgan remained champion.

On 29 October episode of NXT, Ripley was attacked by Morgan and Rodriguez in the WWE Performance Center parking lot. This was reportedly done to write her off television due to a legitimate orbital bone injury suffered the previous week; the injury was announced by WWE the next day and attributed in storyline to the attack. On 18 November episode of Raw, Ripley made a surprise return wearing a protective face shield, challenging the opposition to a WarGames match. At Survivor Series WarGames on 30 November, Ripley, Bianca Belair, Bayley, Iyo Sky and Naomi defeated Morgan, Rodriguez, Nia Jax, Tiffany Stratton and Candice LeRae in a WarGames match, with Ripley pinning Morgan.

==== Championship reigns (2025–present) ====
At the Raw premiere on Netflix on 6 January 2025, Ripley defeated Morgan to win the Women's World Championship for the second time despite interference from Dominik and Rodriguez, ending their feud. At Saturday Night's Main Event on 25 January, Ripley defeated Jax to retain the title. On 3 March episode of Raw, Ripley lost the title to Sky after being distracted by the Elimination Chamber match winner Belair, ending her second reign at 56 days. On Night 2 of WrestleMania 41, Ripley failed to regain the title from Sky in a triple threat match also involving Belair, whom Sky pinned. Dave Meltzer of the Wrestling Observer Newsletter rated the match five stars, making it the first women’s match in WWE history to receive such a rating. Ripley tried to win the title at Evolution and SummerSlam, but was defeated both times.

Over the next few months, Ripley and Sky formed a tag team dubbed "Rhiyo", winning the WWE Women's Tag Team Championship on the 5 January 2026 episode of Raw, when they defeated The Kabuki Warriors (Sane and Asuka). They retained the titles for 53 days until they lost it to The Irresistible Forces (Nia Jax and Lash Legend) on the 27 February episode of SmackDown.

After winning the Elimination Chamber match, Ripley defeated Jade Cargill at WrestleMania 42 to win the WWE Women's Championship for the second time. Following her title win, Ripley was subsequently moved to the SmackDown brand. At Saturday Night's Main Event XLIV on May 23, Ripley, Alexa Bliss and Charlotte Flair lost to Cargill, B-Fab and Michin in a Six-Woman Tag Team Match with Ripley being pinned by Cargill. At Clash in Italy on May 31, Ripley successfully retained the title against Cargill. After sustaining a torn meniscus at Clash in Italy and unable to return in time for SummerSlam in August, WWE crowned Chelsea Green as interim champion until Ripley's return. WWE later retroactively recognised Green's title win as the lineal reign beginning on 2 August at SummerSlam, ending Ripley's second reign at 105 days.

== Other media ==
Bennett made her video game debut as a playable character in WWE 2K20 and subsequently in WWE 2K Battlegrounds, WWE 2K22 and WWE 2K23. Bennett is the cover star for the deluxe edition of WWE 2K24 alongside Bianca Belair. Bennett also appears in Call of Duty: Modern Warfare III as an unlockable operator within the Season 5 battle pass, part of a larger WWE promotion in the game.

== Personal life ==
Bennett cites watching The Miz as an inspiration growing up. In addition to wrestling, Bennett is also trained in or practices swimming, karate, rugby, netball, and soccer. She is a supporter of the Adelaide Football Club.

As of 2022, she has been in a relationship with fellow Australian wrestler Matthew Adams, known professionally as Buddy Matthews. In August 2023 they got engaged and married in June 2024.

Bennett is a fan of the bands Ice Nine Kills, Falling in Reverse and Motionless in White, the latter of which co-wrote her WWE theme song "Demon In Your Dreams" and performed the song live for Bennett's entrance at WrestleMania XL.

In April 2026, Ripley revealed that she was suffering from an eating disorder which had caused her weight loss.

== Filmography ==
Year	Title	Role	Notes
2025	Stephanie’s Places	Herself	Episode: “Rhea Ripley’s Rise”
2025–2026	WWE Unreal	Herself	Documentary, 2 episodes

== Video games ==
Video game appearances
Year	Title	Role	Notes
2019	WWE 2K20	Herself	
2021	WWE 2K Battlegrounds	Herself	
2022	WWE 2K22	Herself	
2023	WWE 2K23	Herself	
2024	WWE 2K24	Herself	
2024	Call of Duty: Modern Warfare III	Herself	
2025	WWE 2K25	Herself	
2026	WWE 2K26	Herself	

== Championships and accomplishments ==
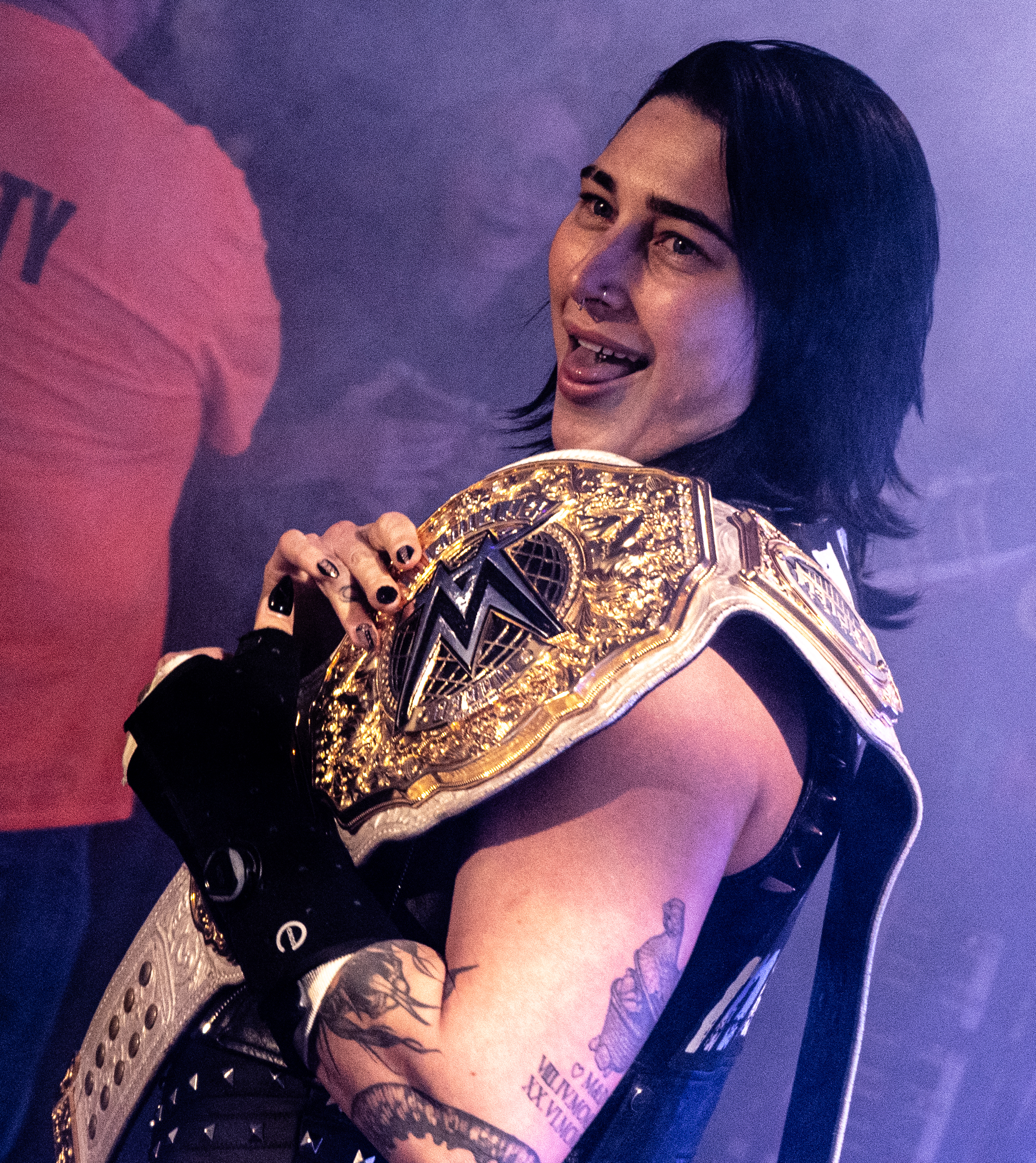
Ripley is a two-time and joint-longest reigning Women's World Champion...

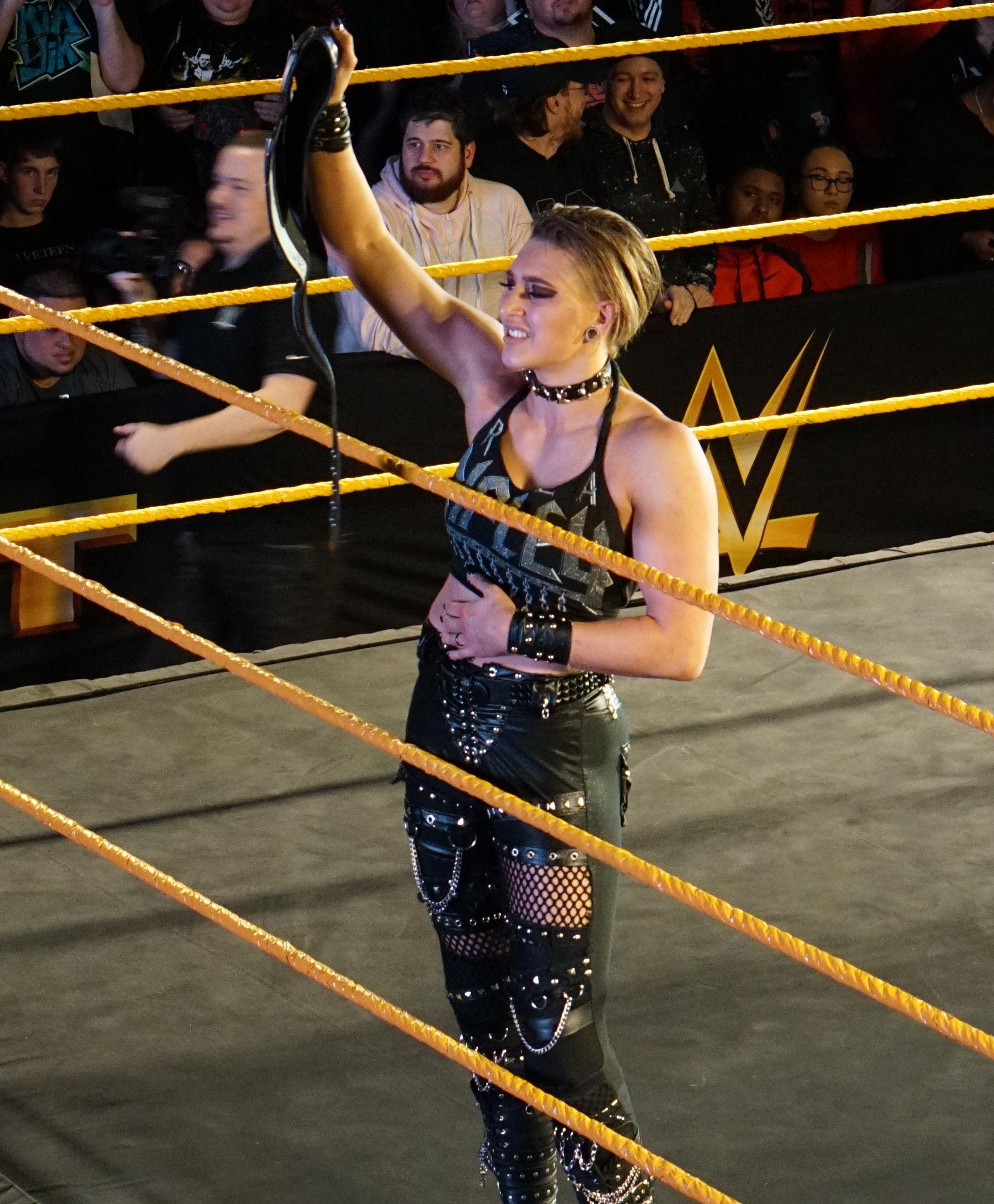
...and a former one-time NXT Women's Champion.

- CBS Sports
  - Breakthrough Wrestler of the Year (2019)
- ESPN
  - Female Wrestler of the Year (2023)
  - Ranked No. 2 of the 30 best Pro Wrestlers Under 30 in 2023
- New York Post
  - Faction of the Year (2023) as part of The Judgment Day
- Pro Wrestling Illustrated
  - Faction of the Year (2023) as part of The Judgment Day
  - Match of the Year (2023) vs. Charlotte Flair at WrestleMania 39
  - Woman of the Year (2023)
  - Ranked No. 1 of the top 250 female wrestlers in the PWI Women's 250 in 2023
- Riot City Wrestling
  - RCW Women's Championship (2 times)
- Sports Illustrated
  - Match of the Year (2025) vs Iyo Sky vs Bianca Belair at WrestleMania 41
  - Ranked No. 7 of the top 10 women's wrestlers in 2019
  - Ranked No. 2 of the top 10 wrestlers of 2023
- Wrestling Observer Newsletter
  - Women's Wrestling MVP (2023)
- WWE
  - WWE Women's Championship (2 times)
  - Women's World Championship (2 times)
  - NXT Women's Championship (1 time)
  - NXT UK Women's Championship (1 time, inaugural)
  - WWE Women's Tag Team Championship (2 times) – with Nikki A.S.H. (1) and Iyo Sky (1)
  - Women's Royal Rumble (2023)
  - NXT UK Women's Championship Tournament (2018)
  - Seventh Women's Triple Crown Champion
  - Fifth Women's Grand Slam Champion
  - Slammy Award (3 times)
    - Match of the Year (2024) – vs. Charlotte Flair for the WWE SmackDown Women's Championship at WrestleMania 39
    - Faction of the Year (2024) – as a member of The Judgment Day
    - Female Superstar of the Year (2024)
- Women's Wrestling Hall of Fame
  - WWHOF Award (1 time)
    - Pro Wrestler of the Year (2025) - shared with Thunder Rosa
