= List of Women's World Champions (WWE) =

The Women's World Championship is a women's professional wrestling world championship created and promoted by the American professional wrestling promotion WWE, defended on the Raw brand. Established as the SmackDown Women's Championship on the August 23, 2016, episode of SmackDown, it was created to be the counterpart to the WWE Women's Championship, which became exclusive to Raw as a result of the 2016 WWE draft and renamed as the Raw Women's Championship. As a result of the 2023 WWE Draft, the Raw and SmackDown women's championships switched brands. In June 2023, the SmackDown Women's Championship was renamed as Women's World Championship while the Raw Women's Championship reverted to its original name of WWE Women's Championship.

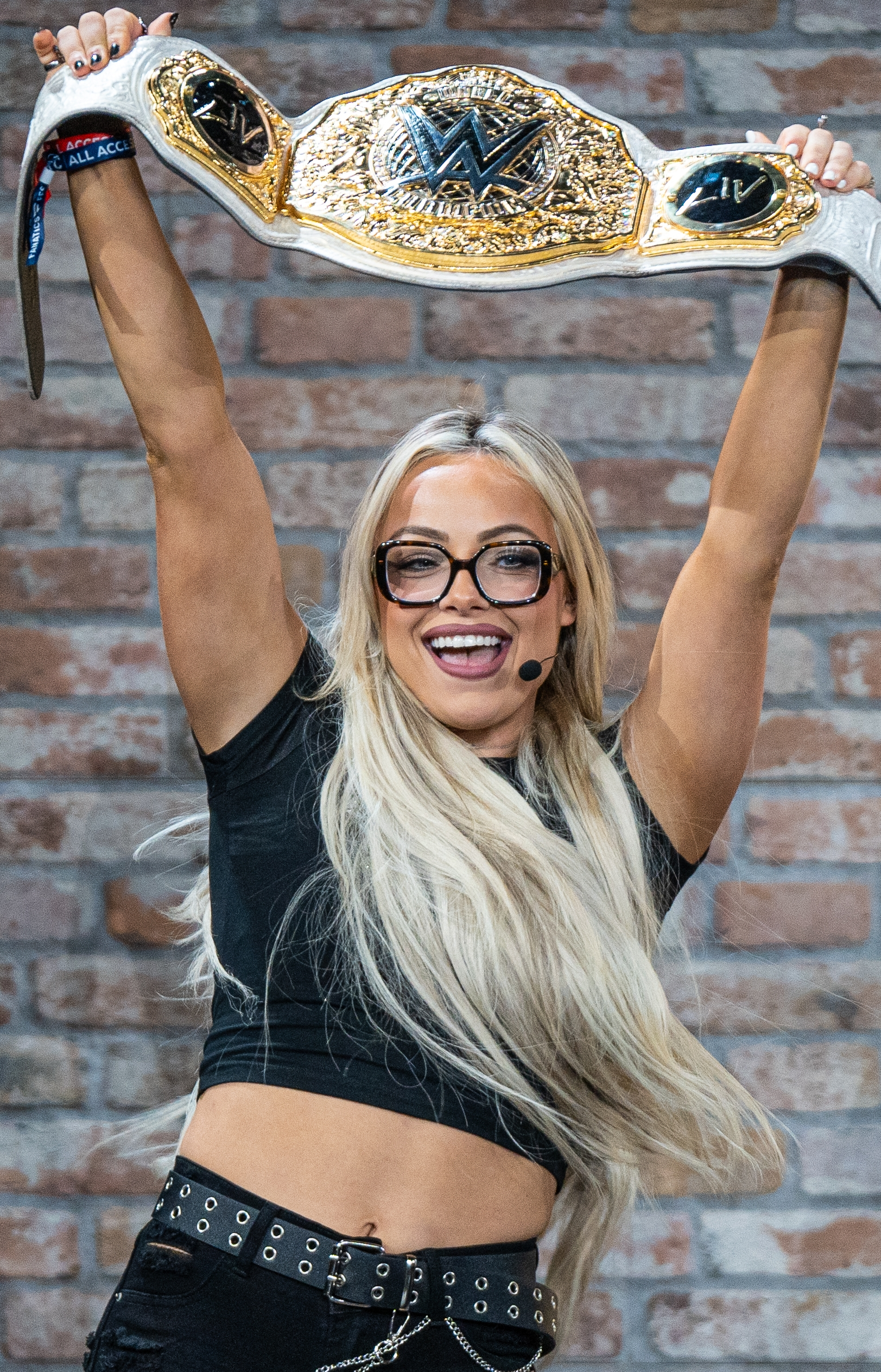
Current and four-time champion Liv Morgan.

Liv Morgan is the current champion in her fourth reign. She won the title by defeating Stephanie Vaquer and Becky Lynch in a triple threat match at Money in the Bank on October 10, 2026.

As of November 22, 2026, there have been 35 reigns between 15 champions and 3 vacancies. Becky Lynch was the inaugural champion. Charlotte Flair has the most reigns at seven. Bayley's second reign and Rhea Ripley's first reign are tied for the longest singular reign at 380 days (379 days for both as recognized by WWE), while Flair's fourth reign is the shortest at 4 minutes and 55 seconds. Bayley holds the record for the longest combined reign at 520 days. Naomi is the oldest champion, having won the title at 37 years, 225 days old, while Alexa Bliss is the youngest when she won it at 25. Only two women have held the title for a continuous reign of one year (365 days) or more: Bayley and Rhea Ripley.

== Title history ==
=== Names ===
Name	Years
WWE SmackDown Women's Championship	August 23, 2016 – June 12, 2023
Women's World Championship	June 12, 2023 – current

=== Reigns ===
Key
No.	Overall reign number
Reign	Reign number for the specific champion
Days	Number of days held
Days recog.	Number of days held recognized by the promotion
<1	Reign lasted less than a day
+	Current reign is changing daily

No.	Champion	Championship change			Reign statistics			Notes	Ref.
No.	Champion	Date	Event	Location	Reign	Days	Days recog.	Notes	Ref.
WWE: SmackDown
1	Becky Lynch	September 11, 2016	Backlash	Richmond, VA	1	84	84	As a result of the 2016 WWE draft, the WWE Women's Championship became exclusive to Raw. In response, SmackDown established the SmackDown Women's Championship and Raw's title was subsequently renamed. Lynch defeated Alexa Bliss, Carmella, Naomi, Natalya, and Nikki Bella in a six-pack elimination challenge to become the inaugural champion.	
2	Alexa Bliss	December 4, 2016	TLC: Tables, Ladders & Chairs	Dallas, TX	1	70	69	This was a tables match.	
3	Naomi	February 12, 2017	Elimination Chamber	Phoenix, AZ	1	9	8		
—	Vacated	February 21, 2017	SmackDown	Ontario, CA	—	—	—	The championship was vacated when Naomi suffered a knee injury and was unable to defend the title within 30 days.	
4	Alexa Bliss	February 21, 2017	SmackDown	Ontario, CA	2	40	40	Defeated Becky Lynch to win the vacant title.	
5	Naomi	April 2, 2017	WrestleMania 33	Orlando, FL	2	140	139	This was a six-pack challenge, also involving Becky Lynch, Carmella, Mickie James, and Natalya.	
6	Natalya	August 20, 2017	SummerSlam	Brooklyn, NY	1	86	86		
7	Charlotte Flair	November 14, 2017	SmackDown	Charlotte, NC	1	147	146		
8	Carmella	April 10, 2018	SmackDown	New Orleans, LA	1	131	130	This was Carmella's Money in the Bank cash-in match.	
9	Charlotte Flair	August 19, 2018	SummerSlam	Brooklyn, NY	2	28	27	This was a triple threat match, also involving Becky Lynch, who Flair pinned.	
10	Becky Lynch	September 16, 2018	Hell in a Cell	San Antonio, TX	2	91	91		
11	Asuka	December 16, 2018	TLC: Tables, Ladders & Chairs	San Jose, CA	1	100	99	This was a triple threat Tables, Ladders, and Chairs match, also involving Charlotte Flair.	
12	Charlotte Flair	March 26, 2019	SmackDown	Uncasville, CT	3	13	12		
13	Becky Lynch	April 8, 2019	WrestleMania 35	East Rutherford, NJ	3	41	41	This was a winner takes all triple threat match for both the Raw Women's Championship and SmackDown Women's Championship, also involving Ronda Rousey, who defended the Raw Women's Championship. Lynch pinned Rousey to win both titles.	
14	Charlotte Flair	May 19, 2019	Money in the Bank	Hartford, CT	4	<1	<1		
15	Bayley	May 19, 2019	Money in the Bank	Hartford, CT	1	140	140	This was Bayley's Money in the Bank cash-in match.	
16	Charlotte Flair	October 6, 2019	Hell in a Cell	Sacramento, CA	5	5	4		
17	Bayley	October 11, 2019	SmackDown	Paradise, NV	2	380	379		
18	Sasha Banks	October 25, 2020	Hell in a Cell	Orlando, FL	1	167	167	This was a Hell in a Cell match.	
19	Bianca Belair	April 10, 2021	WrestleMania 37; Night 1	Tampa, FL	1	133	132		
20	Becky Lynch	August 21, 2021	SummerSlam	Paradise, NV	4	62	62	Bianca Belair was originally scheduled to defend the title against Sasha Banks; however, before the match began, it was announced that Banks was unable to compete for undisclosed reasons. Carmella was then announced as her new opponent, but Lynch made a surprise return from maternity leave, took out Carmella, and challenged Belair to an impromptu match that Belair accepted.	
21	Charlotte Flair	October 22, 2021	SmackDown	Wichita, KS	6	198	197	As a result of the 2021 WWE Draft, then Raw Women's Champion, Charlotte Flair was drafted to SmackDown while Becky Lynch was drafted to Raw. To keep the titles to their respective brands, WWE had the two women exchange championships.	
22	Ronda Rousey	May 8, 2022	WrestleMania Backlash	Providence, RI	1	55	55	This was an "I Quit" match.	
23	Liv Morgan	July 2, 2022	Money in the Bank	Paradise, NV	1	98	97	This was Morgan's Money in the Bank cash-in match. Morgan was a member of the Raw roster prior to the cash-in. She was transferred to the SmackDown brand after winning the championship.	
24	Ronda Rousey	October 8, 2022	Extreme Rules	Philadelphia, PA	2	83	83	This was an Extreme Rules match.	
25	Charlotte Flair	December 30, 2022	SmackDown	Tampa, FL	7	92	92	After Ronda Rousey's successful title defense, Flair made a surprise return from a kayfabe injury and challenged Rousey to an impromptu match for the title that Rousey accepted.	
26	Rhea Ripley	April 1, 2023	WrestleMania 39; Night 1	Inglewood, CA	1	380	379	Ripley won the championship as a member of the Raw brand, but the title did not officially switch to Raw until the 2023 WWE Draft. It was subsequently renamed as the Women's World Championship on the June 12, 2023, episode of Raw.	
WWE: Raw
—	Vacated	April 15, 2024	Raw	Montreal, QC, Canada	—	—	—	Rhea Ripley was forced to relinquish the title due to a legitimate shoulder injury.	
27	Becky Lynch	April 22, 2024	Raw	Columbus, OH	5	33	32	This was a 14-woman Battle Royal for the vacant title in which Lynch last eliminated Liv Morgan to win.	
28	Liv Morgan	May 25, 2024	King and Queen of the Ring	Jeddah, Saudi Arabia	2	226	226		
29	Rhea Ripley	January 6, 2025	Raw premiere on Netflix	Inglewood, CA	2	56	56		
30	Iyo Sky	March 3, 2025	Raw	Buffalo, NY	1	132	131		
31	Naomi	July 13, 2025	Evolution	Atlanta, GA	3	36	35	This was Naomi's Money in the Bank cash-in match, which was originally a singles match between Iyo Sky and Rhea Ripley, but converted into a triple threat match after Naomi cashed-in her contract mid-match. Naomi pinned Sky to win the match. Naomi was a member of the SmackDown roster prior to the cash-in and was subsequently transferred to Raw upon her win.	
—	Vacated	August 18, 2025	Raw	Philadelphia, PA	—	—	—	Naomi relinquished the title after she announced her pregnancy.	
32	Stephanie Vaquer	September 20, 2025	Wrestlepalooza	Indianapolis, IN	1	210	210	Defeated Iyo Sky to win the vacant title.	
33	Liv Morgan	April 18, 2026	WrestleMania 42; Night 1	Paradise, NV	3	147	147		
34	Stephanie Vaquer	September 12, 2026	WWE South America Live Tour; Night 4	Santiago, Chile	2	28	27	Becky Lynch was the special guest referee.	
35	Liv Morgan	October 10, 2026	Money in the Bank	New Orleans, LA	4	43+	43+	This was a triple threat match, also involving Becky Lynch.	

== Combined reigns ==
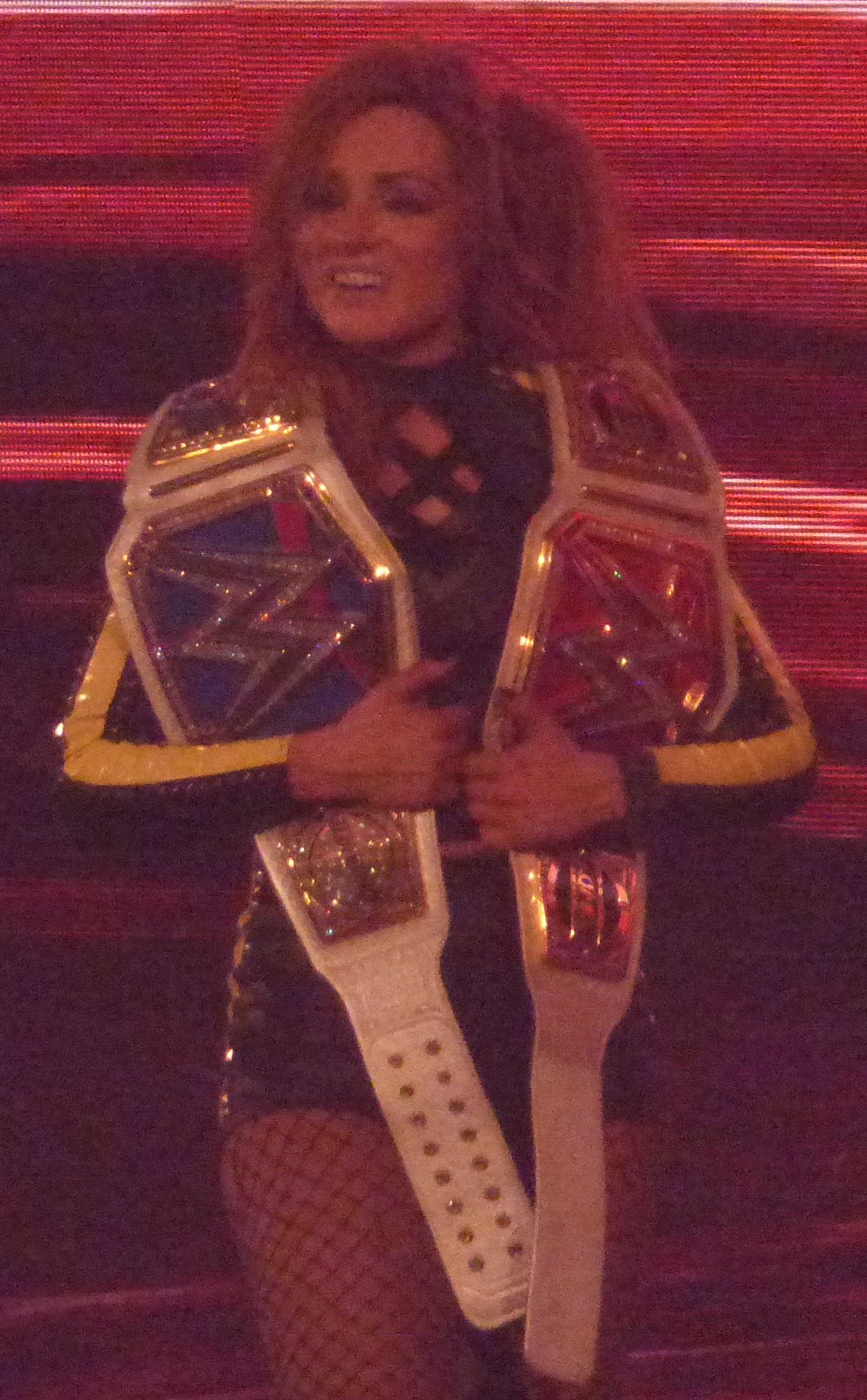
Inaugural and five-time champion Becky Lynch.

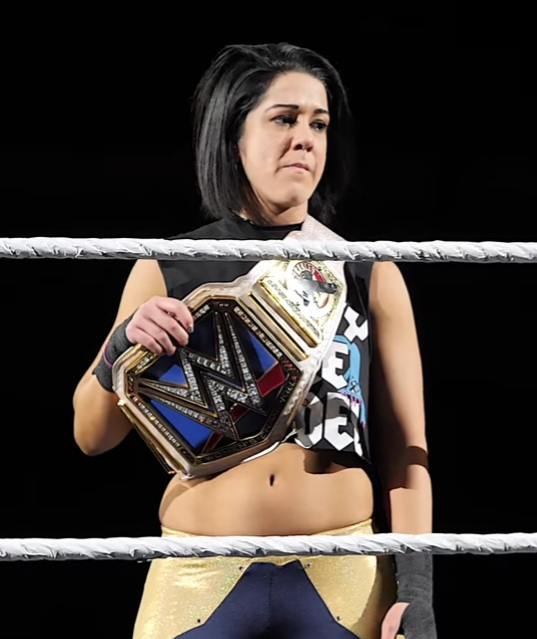
Two-time champion Bayley, whose second reign shares the record with Rhea Ripley for the longest reign at 380 days (379 as recognized by WWE). She also holds the record for the longest combined reign at 520 days (519 as recognized by WWE).

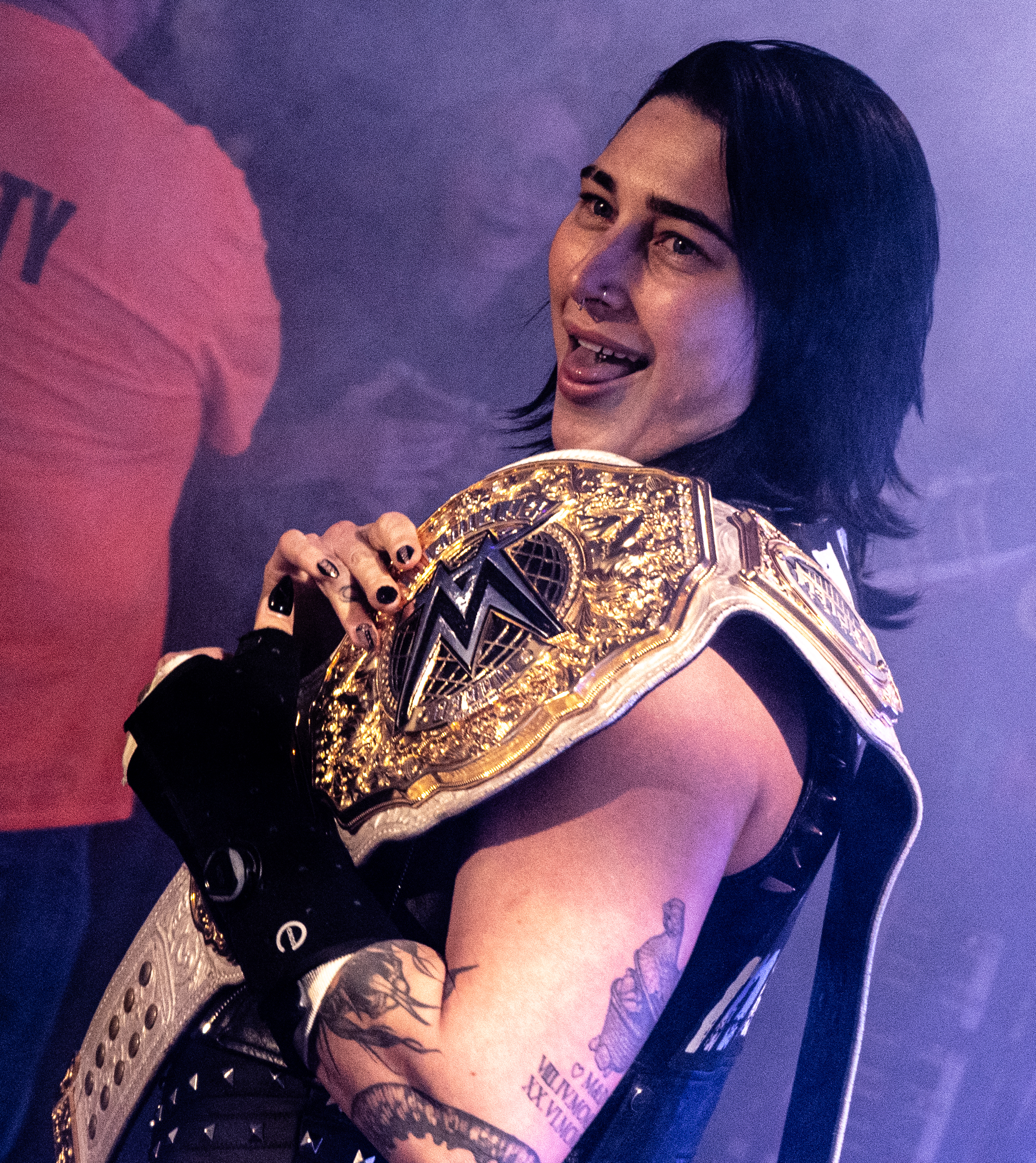
Two-time champion Rhea Ripley, whose first reign ties the record with Bayley for the longest reign at 380 days (379 days as recognized by WWE).

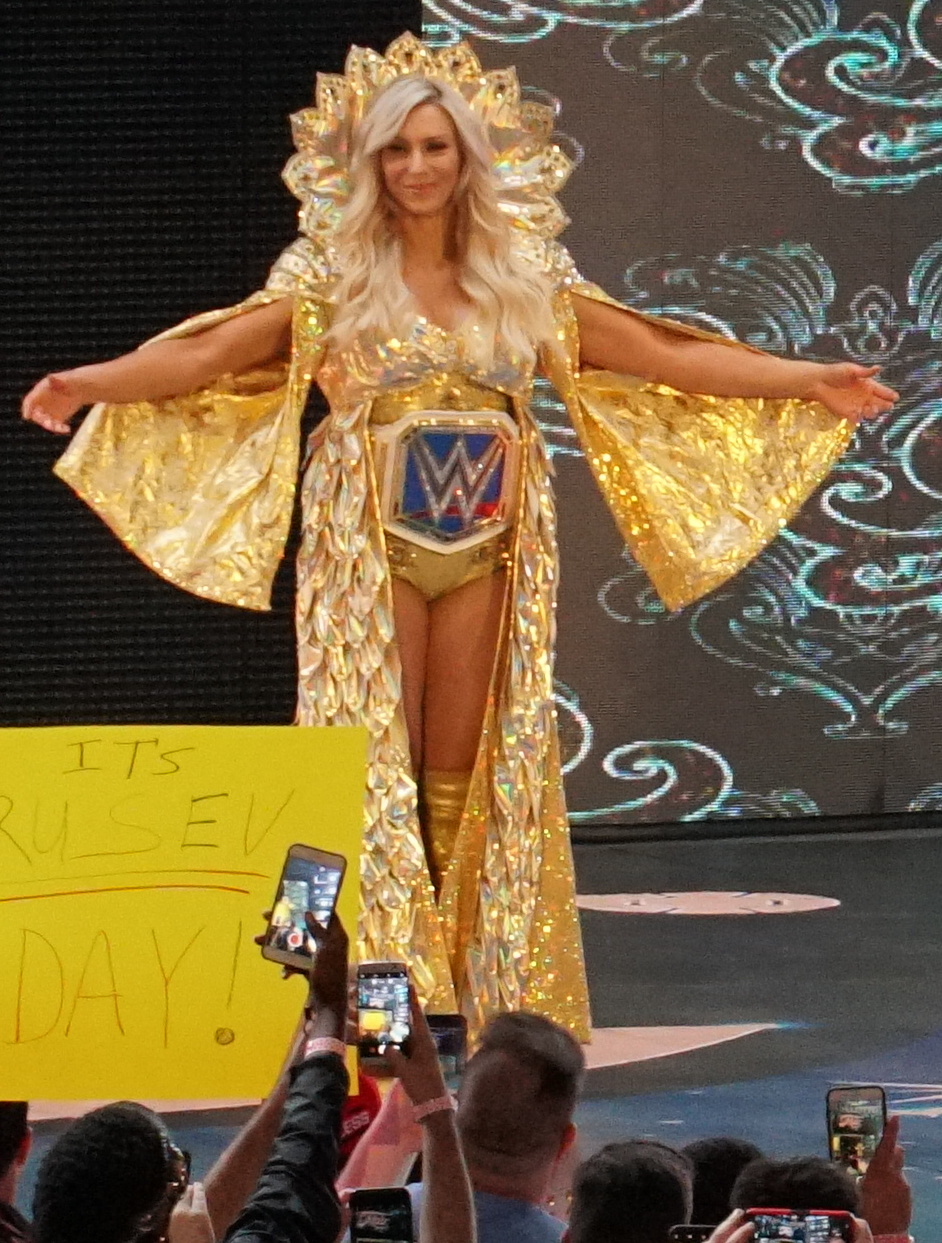
Record seven-time champion Charlotte Flair.

As of November 22, 2026.

†	Indicates the current champion

Rank	Wrestler	No. of reigns	Combined days	Combined days rec. by WWE
1	Bayley	2	520	519
2	Liv Morgan †	4	514+	513+
3	Charlotte Flair	7	483	478
4	Rhea Ripley	2	436	435
5	Becky Lynch	5	311	310
6	Stephanie Vaquer	2	238	237
7	Naomi	3	185	182
8	Sasha Banks	1	167	
9	Ronda Rousey	2	138	
10	Bianca Belair	1	133	132
11	Iyo Sky	1	132	131
12	Carmella	1	131	130
13	Alexa Bliss	2	110	109
14	Asuka	1	100	99
15	Natalya	1	86	
