= Night of Champions: Riyadh =

Night of Champions: Riyadh is a promotional name that has been used by WWE for the professional wrestling event, Night of Champions, when held in Riyadh, Saudi Arabia.

It may refer to:

- Night of Champions (2025)
- Night of Champions (2026)
