= Iyo Sky =

Japanese professional wrestler (born 1990)

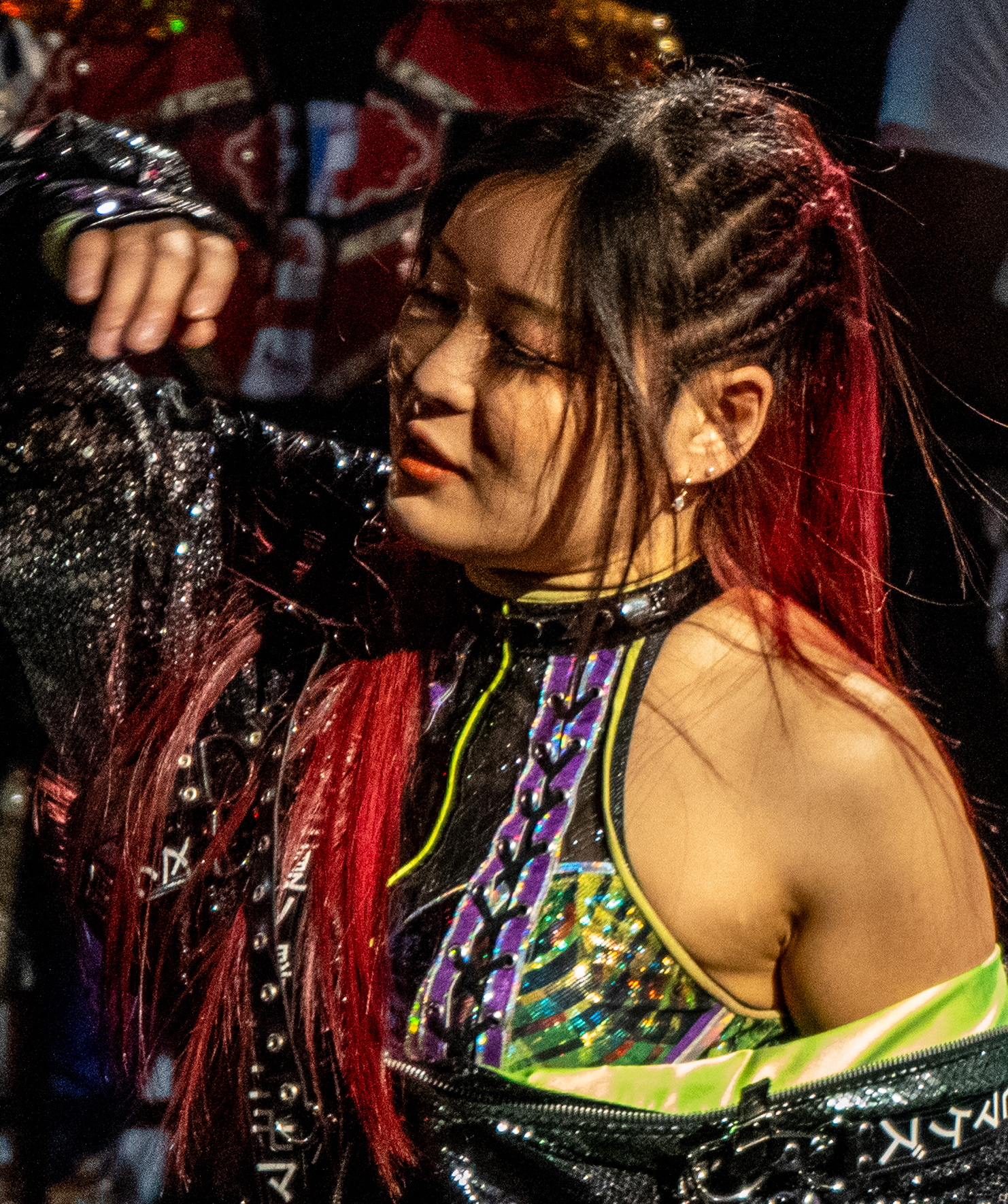
- Sky in 2024

Personal information
- Born: Masami Odate (大館昌美, Ōdate Masami); May 8, 1990 (age 36) Kamakura, Kanagawa, Japan
- Spouse: Evil (m. 2026)
- Relative: Mio Shirai (sister)

Professional wrestling career
- Ring name(s): Biba Kasai; Hitokiri; Io Shirai; Iotica; Iyo Sky; Midnight Angel; Oyuki; T-2 Mask; Tenkū Shōjo Lusca
- Billed height: 155 cm (5 ft 1 in)
- Billed weight: 54 kg (119 lb)
- Billed from: Tokyo, Japan
- Trained by: Takashi Sasaki; Tomohiko Hashimoto
- Debut: March 4, 2007

Masami Odate (大館昌美, Ōdate Masami; born May 8, 1990) is a Japanese professional wrestler. She has been signed to WWE since May 2017, where she performs on the Raw brand under the ring name Iyo Sky (イヨ・スカイ, Iyo Sukai) (stylized in all caps), and is the current WWE Women's Intercontinental Champion in her first reign.

Making her debut in March 2007, she spent several years working as a tag team wrestler, teaming with her older sister Mio Shirai, with whom she wrestled for various promotions across Japan and Mexico. In June 2010, Io and Mio came together with Kana to form the Triple Tails stable, which lasted for 15 months, before Io broke out of the group and embarked on her singles career. She worked for World Wonder Ring Stardom from 2011 to 2018, where she is a two-time World of Stardom Champion, two-time Wonder of Stardom Champion, six-time Artist of Stardom Champion, the inaugural SWA World Champion, one-time Goddesses of Stardom Champion, and one-time High Speed Champion, making her the company's first Grand Slam Champion. She was recognized as the "ace" of Stardom, and was the recipient of the 2015, 2016 and 2017 Tokyo Sports Joshi Puroresu Grand Prizes. Her run in Stardom coincided with the rise of her own stable, Queen's Quest, which carried on after Shirai's departure in 2018 until 2024.

She competed as Io Shirai (紫雷 イオ, Shirai Io) (/ˈiːoʊ/) in WWE's developmental brand NXT from 2018 to 2022, where she is a former one-time NXT Women's Champion, one-time NXT Women's Tag Team Champion (with Zoey Stark), and the winner of the 2022 Women's Dusty Rhodes Tag Team Classic (with Kay Lee Ray). She made her WWE debut at the 2018 Mae Young Classic tournament, where she was the runner-up. In June 2020, Shirai won her first championship in WWE, the NXT Women's Championship. She made her debut on the main roster at SummerSlam in July 2022 under the new ring name Iyo Sky, and joined the stable, Damage CTRL. After winning the Money in the Bank contract, she won the WWE Women's Championship at SummerSlam in August 2023, before losing it at WrestleMania XL in April 2024. In March 2025, Sky won the Women's World Championship, making her the tenth WWE Women's Triple Crown Champion and the seventh WWE Women's Grand Slam Champion. After being promoted to the main roster, she became a former one-time WWE Women's Champion, one-time Women's World Champion, one-time WWE Women's Intercontinental Champion, and three-time WWE Women's Tag Team Champion (twice with Dakota Kai and once with Rhea Ripley). She is also winner of the 2023 Women's Money in the Bank and 2026 Queen of the Ring.

== Professional wrestling career ==
=== Team Makehen (2007–2010) ===
Odate made her professional wrestling debut on March 4, 2007, alongside her older sister, with the two adopting the ring names Io and Mio Shirai, respectively ("Shirai" being Japanese for "Purple Thunder"). In their debut match, the Io sisters teamed with Toshie Uematsu to face the trio of Erika Ura, Nozomi Takesako and Yuri Urai. At the time of her debut, Io was only 16 years old, working part-time while attending high school. After graduating, she started working full-time as a professional wrestler. Starting their careers as freelancers, the Shirai sisters represented Team Makehen, a stable made up of wrestlers trained by Tomohiko Hashimoto, in several independent promotions during their first year in the business, including Ibuki, Pro Wrestling Wave, JWP Joshi Puroresu, and Sendai Girls' Pro Wrestling.

On October 19, 2008, Shirai and Mio debuted for one of Japan's largest professional wrestling promotions, All Japan Pro Wrestling (AJPW), defeating the team of Kyoko Kimura and Mikado. From January to March 2009, the Shirais made several appearances for another large promotion not usually known for female wrestling, Pro Wrestling Zero1. On April 29, the Shirai sisters won their first championship by defeating Moeka Haruhi and Tomoka Nakagawa in a tournament final to become the first TLW (Totally Lethal Wrestling) World Young Women's Tag Team Champions. Despite its name, the championship was owned and promoted by Pro Wrestling Wave. On July 12, Io received her first singles title opportunity, when she unsuccessfully challenged Misaki Ohata for the JWP Junior and Princess of Pro-Wrestling Championships at Ibuki #30. From July to November, the Shirais spent four months working for the Ice Ribbon promotion.

On November 12, 2009, the Shirais entered Pro Wrestling Wave's Captain's Fall Six Person Tag Team Tournament, teaming with Gami, but the trio was defeated in their first round match by Ran Yu-Yu, Ryo Mizunami and Toshie Uematsu. However, the trio earned their way back into the tournament by defeating Misaki Ohata, Moeka Haruhi and Yumi Ohka in a consolation match later that same day. On November 25, the Shirais and Gami first defeated Bullfight Sora, Cherry and Kaoru in the semi-finals and then Ayumi Kurihara, Kana and Shu Shibutani in the finals to win the tournament, with Io, as the captain, scoring the deciding pinfall over Shibutani. On December 23, the Shirais lost the TLW World Young Women's Tag Team Championship to Misaki Ohata and Moeka Haruhi. On May 30, 2010, Io entered the 2010 Catch the Wave tournament. After three wins and one loss, Shirai finished tied at the top of her block, but was eliminated from the tournament on August 10, after being defeated in a tiebreaker match by Ryo Mizunami.

=== Triple Tails (2010–2011) ===
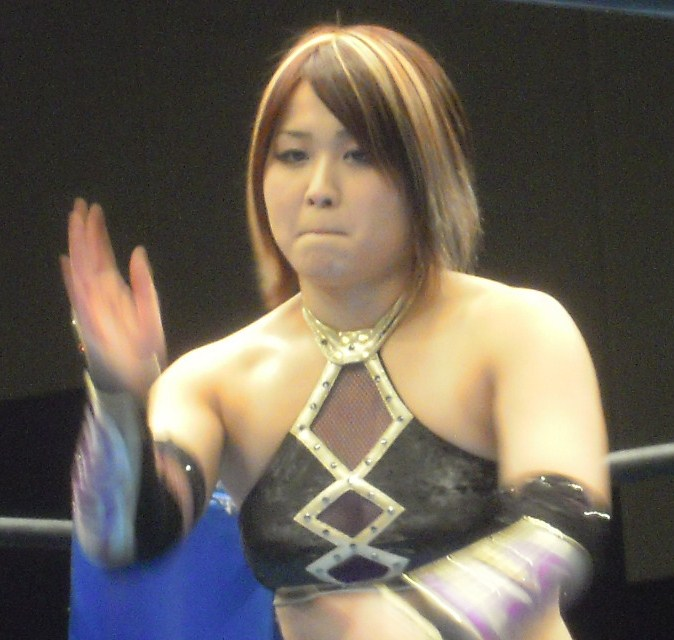
Shirai at an Ice Ribbon event in 2010

On June 19, 2010, the Shirai sisters formed the Triple Tails stable with fellow freelancer Kana, defeating Ayumi Kurihara, Hikaru Shida and Yoshiko Tamura in their first match together at a NEO Japan Ladies Pro Wrestling event. As a result, the Shirais received a shot Kurihara's and Tamura's NEO Tag Team Championship on July 4, but failed to win the titles. On August 1, Io again failed to win the titles, this time with Kana as her partner. Triple Tails returned to its winning ways on August 29, defeating Asami Kawasaki, Shida and Nagisa Nozaki in a six-woman tag team match. On December 19, Triple Tails made its debut as a unit for Pro Wrestling Wave, defeating Cherry, Gami and Tomoka Nakagawa in a six-woman tag team main event.

On January 29, 2011, the Shirais made their debuts for Smash, when the Triple Tails stable attacked Yusuke Kodama and Makoto after their matches, with the trio being both times chased out of the ring by Tajiri. On February 13, Triple Tails produced its first own event, where the Shirai sisters wrestled male tag team Momo no Seishun Tag (Atsushi Kotoge and Daisuke Harada) in a losing effort. On February 25, the Shirais made their Smash in-ring debuts at Smash.14, where they teamed with Kana to defeat Ken Ohka, Tajiri and Yoshiaki Yago in an intergender six person tag team match. In March, Triple Tails took part in Osaka Pro Wrestling's Spring Samba Series, going undefeated in six person tag team matches for the duration of the tour. On April 30 at Smash.16, Triple Tails was defeated by Makoto, Serena and Syuri. On May 3 at Smash.17, the Shirai sisters were defeated by Hikaru Shida and Syuri. Triple Tails' second event took place on May 8 and saw Io, Mio and Kana defeat Akino, Kagetsu and Syuri.

On July 23, Triple Tails held a press conference to announce that, following the group's third self-produced event on September 18, Io was leaving the stable in order to pursue a singles career. On August 21, Triple Tails made its debut for Oz Academy, defeating the trio of Ayumi Kurihara, Hiren and Yumi Ohka. On September 14, Triple Tails defeated Cherry, Moeka Haruhi and Shuu Shibutani in the group's final Pro Wrestling Wave appearance. Four days later, Triple Tails defeated Dash Chisako, Ryo Mizunami and Sendai Sachiko at their third self-produced event in the group's final appearance together.

=== Mexico (2010–2015) ===
In 2010, Shirai traveled to Mexico, where she entered a local wrestling school to undergo further training. On October 14, 2010, Shirai, working under the ring name Viva Kasai, made her debut for International Wrestling Revolution Group (IWRG) at an event in Naucalpan, Mexico, where she teamed with Mini Abismo Negro, Monster Clown and Yuriko to defeat El Hijo de Cien Caras, Mari Apache, Mascarita Divina and Pasión Cristal via disqualification in an eight-person tag team match. In Mexico, both Shirais worked under cat-like masks they would only wear for their entrances in Japan. On October 31, both of the Shirai sisters were brought over to AAA, which had a working relationship with IWRG, and repackaged, with Io adopting the ring name Oyuki and Mio becoming Kaguya. In their first AAA match, Oyuki, Kaguya and Yuriko lost to Cynthia Moreno, Gato Eveready and Mari Apache in a six-person tag team match. During their stay in AAA, Oyuki and Kaguya became associates of the La Legión Extranjera (Foreign Legion) stable. On November 7, Oyuki and Kaguya defeated Faby and Mari Apache and afterwards stole Faby's AAA World Mixed Tag Team Championship and Mari's AAA Reina de Reinas Championship belts. On November 15, the Apaches and Cynthia Moreno defeated Oyuki, Kaguya and Sexy Star. A week later, Oyuki, Kaguya and Jennifer Blake defeated Moreno and the Apaches. This marked Oyuki's and Kaguya's final AAA appearance, which resulted in the storyline with the Apaches being dropped without a conclusion.

Shirai, now working without her mask and under the ring name Io Shirai, returned to Mexico on May 15, 2011, at Lucha Fan Fest 4, where she teamed with Nosawa to defeat Chica Tormenta and Mike Segura for the vacant Americas World Mixed Tag Team Championship. In November 2011, Shirai returned to Mexico with Wrestling All-Star Pros (WASP) for another two-week tour. On November 1, Shirai put her hair on the line in her first Lucha de Apuestas Hair vs. Mask match, a four-way intergender elimination match, where she faced Ángel o Demonio, La Maléfica and Shitara. Eventually, the match came down to Shirai and La Maléfica, ending with Shirai submitting her opponent for the win, forcing her to unmask herself. Shirai and Nosawa defended the Americas World Mixed Tag Team Championship back in Japan on January 3, 2012, defeating Ken Ohka and Mio Shirai at a Union Pro Wrestling event. Shirai returned to Mexico on May 19 to take part in Lucha Expo in Mexico City, where she teamed with Keira to defeat Chica Tormenta and La Vaquerita.

Upon Shirai's return to Japan, she was arrested under suspicion of marijuana smuggling. This resulted in a two-year break from her regular trips to Mexico before Shirai returned to the country on January 27, 2014. Shirai returned to Mexico on May 11 to take part in Toryumon Mexico's DragonMania 9 event, where she, Dark Angel, Kairi Hojo and Mayu Iwatani defeated Ahy Lyyn, Baby Star, Diosa Atenea and Mystique. On May 23, 2015, Shirai returned to Mexico, first taking part in Toryumon Mexico's DragonMania 10 event in Arena México, where she, Diosa Atenea, Mayu Iwatani and Mima Shimoda defeated India Mazahua, India Sioux, Maligna and Xena. Later that same day, Shirai also took part in Lucha Fan Fest 8, where she, Dos Caras and Vanely defeated Atenea, Iwatani and Brazo de Plata.

=== World Wonder Ring Stardom (2011–2018) ===
After leaving Triple Tails, Shirai, though still billed as a freelancer, effectively made World Wonder Ring Stardom her new home promotion, making her debut on August 14, 2011, when she teamed with Nanae Takahashi to defeat Yoko Bito and Yuzuki Aikawa, pinning Aikawa and afterwards challenging her to a match for the Wonder of Stardom Championship. Shirai continued to team with Takahashi the following month, before unsuccessfully challenging Aikawa for the championship on September 25. On October 10, Shirai and Takahashi entered the Goddesses of Stardom Tag League. When the tournament concluded two weeks later, Shirai and Takahashi finished with a record of one win and two losses and did not advance in the tournament. In January 2012, Shirai formed the Planet stable with Arisa Hoshiki, Mayu Iwatani and Natsumi Showzuki. On March 4, Shirai produced her own independent event named Carino!, which celebrated her fifth anniversary in professional wrestling and during which she officially aligned herself with Stardom. In the main event, Shirai teamed with Dark Angel, whom she had befriended during her time in Mexico, to defeat Miho Wakizawa and Nanae Takahashi. On March 25, Shirai unsuccessfully challenged Natsuki☆Taiyo for the High Speed Championship. On April 22, Shirai, Arisa Hoshiki and Natsumi Showzuki of the Planet stable made it to the finals of a six-woman tag team tournament, set to determine the number one stable in Stardom, however, they lost to Nanae Gundan (Miho Wakizawa, Nanae Takahashi and Yuuri Haruka).

Following her May 2012 drug arrest and eventual acquittal, Shirai made her in-ring return on July 22, taking part in a Stardom Rumble to determine the final four participants in the 2012 5Star Grand Prix. Shirai scored the last elimination of the match, pinning Planet stablemate Mayu Iwatani to qualify for the tournament. Shirai finished the tournament, held from August 19 to September 30, with two wins, one draw and one loss, failing to advance to the finals. On October 27, Shirai and Mayu Iwatani entered the 2012 Goddesses of Stardom Tag League under the team name "Thunder Rock", defeating previous year's finalists, Kawasaki Katsushika Saikyou Densetsu (Natsuki☆Taiyo and Yoshiko) in their opening round-robin match. However, after losing their two remaining round-robin matches, Shirai and Iwatani failed to qualify for the finals of the tournament. On January 14, 2013, Shirai, along with Planet stablemates Iwatani and Natsumi Showzuki, entered a tournament to determine the inaugural Artist of Stardom Champions. They were, however, eliminated in their first round match by Team Shimmer (Kellie Skater, Portia Perez and Tomoka Nakagawa). Six days later, Shirai and Iwatani unsuccessfully challenged Kawasaki Katsushika Saikyou Densetsu (Natsuki☆Taiyo and Yoshiko) for the Goddesses of Stardom Championship.

On March 24, Shirai first defeated Kaori Yoneyama in the semi-finals and then Dark Angel in the finals to become the number one contender to the World of Stardom Championship at the biggest event in Stardom's history on April 29 at Ryōgoku Kokugikan. Shirai faced off with the reigning World of Stardom Champion, Alpha Female, for the first time on March 31, when she and Dark Angel were defeated in a tag team match by Kyoko Kimura and the champion, who pinned Shirai for a decisive win. On April 29, at Ryōgoku Cinderella, Shirai defeated Alpha Female to become the third World of Stardom Champion. Shirai made her first successful title defense on June 2 against Yoshiko. On August 17, Shirai defeated Kyoko Kimura for her second successful title defense. From August 25 to September 23, Shirai took part in 5★Star GP2013, where she finished with a record of three wins, one draw and one loss, with a draw on the final day against rookie Takumi Iroha costing her a spot in the finals. Shirai and Iroha then teamed up for the 2013 Goddesses of Stardom Tag Tournament, but were eliminated in their first round match on October 20 by Kairi Hojo and Nanae Takahashi, the winner of the 5★Star GP2013 who was now eyeing a shot at Shirai's World of Stardom Championship. The title match between Shirai and Takahashi took place on November 4 at Stardom's 100th event, where Shirai was victorious with only one second remaining in the thirty-minute time limit, making her third successful title defense. Post-match, Shirai offered the next shot at her title to JWP Joshi Puroresu wrestler Arisa Nakajima. Nakajima accepted the match on the condition that she could first regain the JWP Openweight Championship. On December 16, the day after Nakajima had regained the title, a title match between Shirai and Nakajima for both the World of Stardom and JWP Openweight Championships was made official for December 29. The match ended in a thirty-minute time limit draw, meaning that both champions retained their titles. Post-match, Shirai was challenged to another double title match by new High Speed Champion Natsuki☆Taiyo. At Stardom's annual awards ceremony later that same day, Shirai was named the promotion's MVP of 2013.

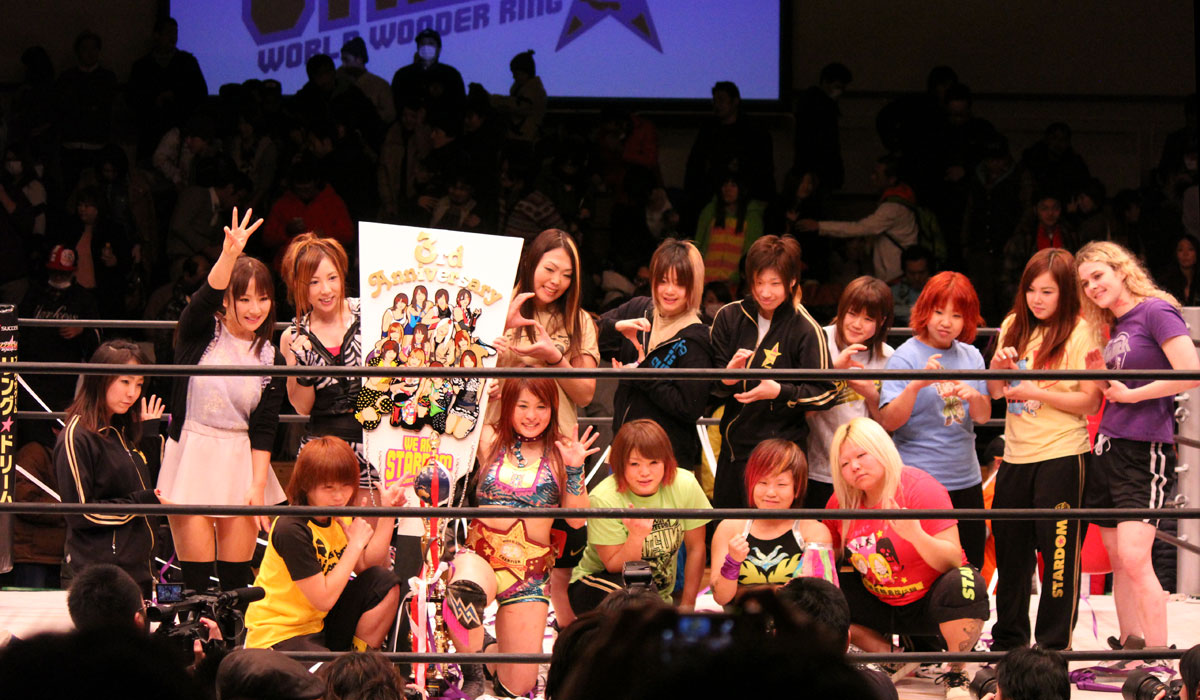
Shirai (with the World of Stardom Championship) alongside various wrestlers from the 2014 incarnation of Stardom's roster.

On January 26, 2014, at Stardom's third anniversary event, Shirai defeated High Speed Champion Natsuki☆Taiyo in a match, where only the World of Stardom Championship was on the line, to make her fifth successful title defense. Nearing the one-year anniversary of her title victory, Shirai vowed to break Nanae Takahashi's records for both the longest reign (602 days) and most successful title defenses (seven), while also announcing she was accepting challengers from all over the world. Shirai made her sixth successful title defense against American wrestler Melissa on March 16, and the record-tying seventh successful defense against previous champion Alpha Female on April 29. On May 6, Shirai became a double champion in Stardom, when she defeated the soon-to-retire Natsuki☆Taiyo for the High Speed Championship. On May 17, Shirai made her record-setting eighth successful defense of the World of Stardom Championship by defeating Star Fire at Lucha Fan Fest 7 in Mexico City. Upon her return to Stardom, Shirai made her ninth successful title defense against Takumi Iroha on June 1. Afterwards, she offered the next title shot to Meiko Satomura, who had defeated her in a non-title match at a Sendai Girls' Pro Wrestling event on April 26. On July 10, Shirai defeated Satomura for her tenth successful defense of the World of Stardom Championship. On July 20, Shirai got an opportunity to become Stardom's first Triple Crown Champion, but she and Takumi Iroha, billed collectively as "Heisei Star", failed in their attempt to capture the Goddesses of Stardom Championship from Kimura Monster-gun (Alpha Female and Kyoko Kimura). On August 10, Shirai lost the World of Stardom Championship to Yoshiko, ending her reign at 468 days.

After their World of Stardom Championship match against each other, Shirai and Yoshiko agreed to form a new partnership, which was also joined by Mayu Iwatani, Reo Hazuki and Takumi Iroha. The five, all born during the Heisei period, started a new rivalry with Stardom's older Shōwa period-born wrestlers, led by Nanae Takahashi. From August 24 to September 23, Shirai took part in the 2014 5★Star GP. After three wins and two losses, Shirai advanced to the finals, where she defeated Yoshiko to win the tournament. On November 3, Shirai and Yoshiko, whose partnership was now officially known as "Heisei-gun" ("Heisei Army"), unsuccessfully challenged Shōwa-gun's Kairi Hojo and Nanae Takahashi for the Goddesses of Stardom Championship. Later that month, Shirai and Iwatani made it to the finals of the 2014 Goddesses of Stardom Tag League, but were defeated by Hojo and Takahashi. On November 24, Shirai made her first successful defense of the High Speed Championship against Shōwa-gun's Koguma. On December 7, Shirai once again became a double champion, when she and Heisei-gun stablemates Mayu Iwatani and Takumi Iroha defeated Tomodachi Mania (Hatsuhinode Kamen, Kaori Yoneyama and Tsubasa Kuragaki) to win the Artist of Stardom Championship. On February 14, Shirai took part in her sister Mio's independent M.I.O event, defeating Mio in a main event singles match, which marked their first match together in three years. On February 22, Shirai lost the High Speed Championship to Koguma in her third defense. On March 29, following Yoshiko's suspension from Stardom, Shirai was entered into a four-woman tournament to determine the new World of Stardom Champion. After defeating Takumi Iroha, she advanced to the finals of the tournament, where she was defeated by Hojo. On April 14, Heisei-gun was stripped of the Artist of Stardom Championship due to Iroha being sidelined with a knee injury. On May 6, Shirai and Iwatani first defeated Oedo Tai (Kris Wolf and Star Fire) and then Candy Crush (Chelsea and Hojo) to win a tournament for the vacant Goddesses of Stardom Championship. On May 17, Shirai defeated Nikki Storm in a decision match to win the vacant Wonder of Stardom Championship, becoming the first wrestler to have held all five of Stardom's championships.

Ahead of Mio Shirai's impending retirement from professional wrestling, she made her Stardom debut on July 26, 2015, to wrestle what was billed as the Shirai sisters' final match together, where Io and Mio defeated Hiroyo Matsumoto and Iwatani. On September 23, Shirai and Iwatani broke the record for most successful defenses of the Goddesses of Stardom Championship by defeating Dash Chisako and Sendai Sachiko for their fourth defense. On October 17, Shirai defeated Mia Yim in Covina, California, during Stardom's first American tour, to make her sixth successful defense of the Wonder of Stardom Championship. During the second event in Baldwin Park, California two days later, Shirai and Iwatani made their fifth successful defense of the Goddesses of Stardom Championship against Hiroyo Matsumoto and Kellie Skater. On November 8, Shirai and Iwatani won the 2015 Goddesses of Stardom Tag League, defeating Alex Lee and Kaori Yoneyama in the first round and Hiroyo Matsumoto and Santana Garrett in the final match, which also marked their sixth successful defense of the Goddesses of Stardom Championship. After seven successful title defenses, Shirai lost the Wonder of Stardom Championship to Garrett on November 23 in a match also contested for Garrett's NWA World Women's Championship. On December 7, Tokyo Sports voted Shirai the joshi wrestler of the year over Kairi Hojo, Meiko Satomura and Saki Akai.

On December 23, 2015, Shirai defeated Satomura to become the first two-time World of Stardom Champion. Meanwhile, Thunder Rock also continued their reign as the Goddesses of Stardom Champions, defeating the rookie team of Jungle Kyona and Momo Watanabe on January 10, 2016, for their seventh successful title defense. On January 17, Shirai made her first successful defense of the World of Stardom Championship against Hojo. On February 28, Shirai became a triple champion, when she, Iwatani and Hojo, billed collectively as "Threedom" (a combination of the words "Three" and "Stardom"), defeated Evie, Hiroyo Matsumoto and Kellie Skater to win the Artist of Stardom Championship. In April, Shirai, along with Iwatani and Hojo, traveled to the United States to take part in events held by Lucha Underground and Vendetta Pro Wrestling. On May 15, Thunder Rock faced off in a match, where Shirai made her fourth successful defense of the World of Stardom Championship against Iwatani. Later that month, Stardom wrestlers took part in a European tour, during which the promotion debuted the new Stardom World Association (SWA) World Championship. On May 21, Shirai first defeated Kay Lee Ray in the first round, then Dragonita in the semi-finals and Toni Storm in the finals to win the tournament and become the inaugural champion. After setting records for both the longest reign and most successful title defenses, Shirai and Iwatani lost the Goddesses of Stardom Championship to Kagetsu and Kyoko Kimura in their 11th title defense on June 16. On July 24, Shirai lost the SWA World Championship to Storm in her third defense. Subsequently, Shirai underwent a tailbone surgery, but was only expected to miss one month of in-ring action. On October 2, Threedom lost the Artist of Stardom Championship to Oedo Tai (Hana Kimura, Kagetsu and Kyoko Kimura) in their third defense. On November 11, Thunder Rock made it to the finals of the 2016 Goddesses of Stardom Tag League. After losing to Kairi Hojo and Yoko Bito, Shirai turned on Iwatani, declared that Thunder Rock and Threedom were history and formed a new partnership with an unidentified masked woman.

On November 20, Shirai and her new partner, now revealed as the former Reo Hazuki and renamed "HZK", were joined by Momo Watanabe, who turned on Mayu Iwatani during a tag team match. The Shirai led new stable was later dubbed "Queen's Quest". On December 14, Shirai was awarded her second consecutive joshi wrestler of the year award by Tokyo Sports. Shirai made her ninth successful defense of the World of Stardom Championship against Iwatani on December 22. On January 7, 2017, Queen's Quest became the new Artist of Stardom Champions by defeating Oedo Tai (Kagetsu, Kyoko Kimura and Viper) for the vacant title. On February 11, after Watanabe had been sidelined with an injury, Azumi became the newest member of Queen's Quest, adopting the ring name "AZM". On February 23, Shirai made her eleventh successful defense of the World of Stardom Championship against Shayna Baszler, breaking her own record for most defenses of the title. On March 9, Shirai celebrated her tenth anniversary in professional wrestling with a special event, which saw her team with Meiko Satomura to defeat Chihiro Hashimoto and Iwatani. On April 9, Queen's Quest was stripped of the Artist of Stardom Championship due to Watanabe's injury. Queen's Quest, now represented by Shirai, AZM and HZK, regained the title six days later by defeating Oedo Tai (Kimura, Kagetsu and Rosa Negra) in the finals of a four-team tournament. They lost the title to Hiromi Mimura, Kairi Hojo and Konami in their first defense on May 6, only to regain it on June 4. They lost the title to Team Jungle (Hiroyo Matsumoto, Jungle Kyona and Kaori Yoneyama) in their first defense on June 17. After a reign of 18 months with a record 14 successful title defenses, Shirai lost the World of Stardom Championship to Wonder of Stardom Champion Mayu Iwatani on June 21. The following day, Shirai went on an indefinite hiatus to undergo treatment for a neck injury. She had suffered the injury taking a piledriver from Toni Storm during their World of Stardom Championship match on May 14.

Shirai returned from injury on July 30, 2017, offering Oedo Tai member Viper a membership in Queen's Quest. After Viper accepted the offer, Shirai vowed to regain the Artist of Stardom Championship and win the 2017 5★Star GP. Shirai's return match took place on August 13, when she, HZK and Viper regained the Artist of Stardom Championship from Matsumoto, Kyona and Yoneyama. On November 19, Shirai defeated Yoko Bito to win the Wonder of Stardom Championship for the second time. On December 14, Shirai became the first wrestler in history to win three consecutive female wrestler of the year awards from Tokyo Sports. On April 21, 2018, Shirai made her tenth successful defense of the Wonder of Stardom Championship against Martina, breaking Santana Garrett's record for most defenses of the title. On May 23, Shirai lost the Wonder of Stardom Championship to Momo Watanabe in her twelfth title defense.

On May 29, Shirai announced her departure from Stardom. She wrestled her last match on June 10, taking part in a ten-match one-minute time limit series against members of the Stardom roster that ended in one win and one loss.

=== WWE ===
==== Signing and Mae Young Classic (2017–2018) ====
In October 2016, the Wrestling Observer Newsletter reported that both Shirai and Kairi Hojo had been contacted and offered WWE contracts, starting in 2017. Reportedly, Shirai had informed Stardom's management that she was taking the offer. In March 2017, Shirai took part in a WWE tryout at the WWE Performance Center in Orlando, Florida. Her tryout was not supposed to go public, but due to a communications issue, she was featured on WWE's official website in an article that was taken down shortly afterwards. After the tryout, Shirai confirmed that she had been offered a contract.

On May 15, 2017, Dave Meltzer of the Wrestling Observer Newsletter reported that Shirai had accepted the contract offer from WWE. The following month, it was reported that a WWE medical examination had discovered a neck injury that would delay Shirai's WWE debut. In August, Meltzer reported that just as doctors had cleared Shirai to return to the ring, WWE had rescinded their contract offer, noting the company had a "general rule of not wanting to bring in new talent that either has concussion issues or neck issues". It was later reported that the medical examination had also found an issue with Shirai's heart. Japanese doctors had cleared Shirai for both her heart and neck, but WWE doctors suggested passing on signing her. Six months later on May 28, 2018, Tokyo Sports reported that Shirai was in discussions with WWE. On May 29, Shirai announced she would be leaving Stardom.

Shirai made her first official appearance for the promotion on June 30, 2018, at the WWE house show in Ryōgoku Kokugikan, where it was announced she had signed with the promotion and would be competing in their developmental brand, NXT. She participated in the 2018 Mae Young Classic tournament. On August 8, Shirai defeated Xia Brookside in the tournament's first round in her WWE debut match. The following day, on August 9, Shirai defeated Zeuxis in the second round, Deonna Purrazzo in the quarterfinals and Rhea Ripley in the semi–finals. In the finals, held at WWE Evolution on October 28, Shirai was defeated by Toni Storm.

==== NXT (2018–2022) ====
In her first appearance for NXT, Shirai debuted on November 17, 2018, at TakeOver: WarGames where she and Dakota Kai saved her best friend Kairi Sane during her match with Shayna Baszler from an assault by her allies Jessamyn Duke and Marina Shafir. She wrestled her debut match on the December 19 episode of NXT, where she and Kai defeated Duke and Shafir. The following week, Shirai competed in a fatal four-way match to determine the number one contender for the NXT Women's Championship, however, the match was won by Bianca Belair. Shortly after, with Kai sidelined with an injury, Shirai continued to team with Sane, forming a tag team known as "The Sky Pirates" while continuing to defeat various teams.

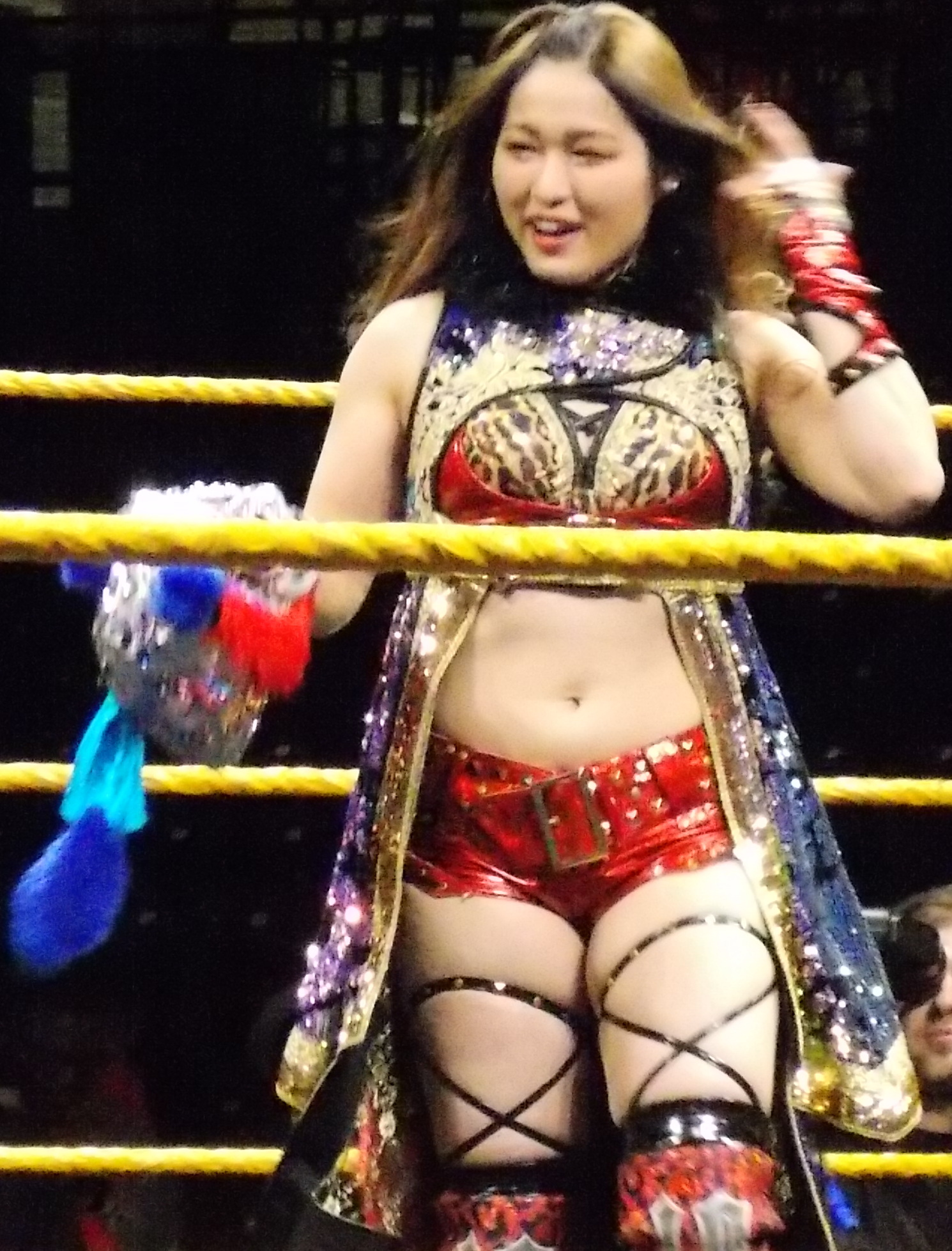
Shirai at an NXT event in 2019

On April 5, 2019, at TakeOver: New York, Shirai took part in a fatal four-way match for the NXT Women's Championship, however, Baszler submitted Belair to retain the title. On April 11 (episode aired on tape delay on April 17), Shirai interfered in Sane's rematch with Baszler and attacked her as she was looking to injure Sane, resulting in a disqualification loss for Sane. As a result, Sane was not allowed to challenge for the NXT Women's Championship anymore, writing her off the brand. The Sky Pirates disbanded following Sane's move to the main roster, after which Shirai continued her feud with Baszler, Duke and Shafir as the three continuously attacked her. This ultimately led to a match between Shirai and Baszler for the NXT Women's Championship at TakeOver: XXV on June 1, 2019, where Shirai failed to win the title despite Candice LeRae's interference and attack on Duke and Shafir.

After failing to win the title from Baszler in a steel cage match on the June 26 episode of NXT, Shirai attacked LeRae (who once again took out Duke and Shafir), turning heel. Shirai developed a new image, adopting a new entrance theme and wearing black leather. At TakeOver: Toronto on August 10, Shirai defeated LeRae via submission. Three months later, Shirai joined Baszler's team for the inaugural women's WarGames match at TakeOver: WarGames on November 23, where Baszler's team lost to Rhea Ripley and LeRae, despite having a 2-on-4 advantage. The next night at Survivor Series, Shirai competed as part of Team NXT, in the first-ever 5-on-5-on-5 women's Survivor Series match, which Team NXT won with Shirai as one of the survivors. During a match against Toni Storm on the January 22, 2020 episode of NXT, Shirai suffered a minor injury that kept her out of action for two months.

Shirai returned on the March 25 episode of NXT and qualified for a number one contender's ladder match on April 8, which she won for an opportunity against new NXT Women's Champion Charlotte Flair. She received her title match on the May 6 episode of NXT, winning via disqualification when Flair attacked her with a kendo stick. At TakeOver: In Your House on June 7, Shirai defeated Flair and Ripley in a triple threat match to win the NXT Women's Championship, marking her first title win in WWE. On July 2, Shirai defeated Sasha Banks in a non-title match at The Great American Bash special episode of NXT. Shirai slowly transitioned into a tweener and successfully defended her title against Tegan Nox and Dakota Kai on August 22 at TakeOver XXX. In September, Shirai renewed her rivalry with Candice LeRae, whom she defeated to retain the title at TakeOver 31 on October 4 and in the inaugural tables, ladders and scares match at Halloween Havoc on October 28. On the November 18 episode of NXT, Shirai successfully defended her title against Ripley. At TakeOver: WarGames on December 6, Shirai was a part of Team Blackheart (herself, Shotzi Blackheart, Ripley and Ember Moon), losing to Team LeRae (LeRae, Storm, Kai and Raquel González) after González pinned Shirai. She successfully defended the title against Mercedes Martinez and Storm in a triple threat match on February 14, 2021 at TakeOver: Vengeance Day and Storm on the March 10 episode of NXT. On April 7, in the main event of Night 1 of TakeOver: Stand & Deliver, Shirai lost the title to González, ending her reign at 304 days.

In June, Shirai allied with Zoey Stark as a tag team, winning a triple threat match to become the number one contenders for the NXT Women's Tag Team Championship. At The Great American Bash on July 6, Shirai and Stark defeated The Way (LeRae and Indi Hartwell) to win the titles. They successfully defended the titles against Kacy Catanzaro and Kayden Carter and Toxic Attraction (Gigi Dolin and Jacy Jayne) on the September 7 and 28 episodes of NXT, before losing them to Toxic Attraction in a triple threat Scareway to Hell ladder match also involving Hartwell and Persia Pirotta at Halloween Havoc on October 26, ending their reign at 111 days. At WarGames on December 5, Shirai, Cora Jade, Kay Lee Ray and González defeated Kai and Toxic Attraction in a WarGames match. She then entered the Women's Dusty Rhodes Tag Team Classic with Ray, which they won after defeating Kai and Wendy Choo in the finals. Shirai and Ray decided to challenge Mandy Rose for the NXT Women's Championship at Stand & Deliver on April 2 instead of challenging tag team champions Dolin and Jayne, but they failed to win the title in what was Shirai's final match in NXT. In June, it was reported Shirai was out of action with an injury.

==== Formation of Damage CTRL (2022–2023) ====
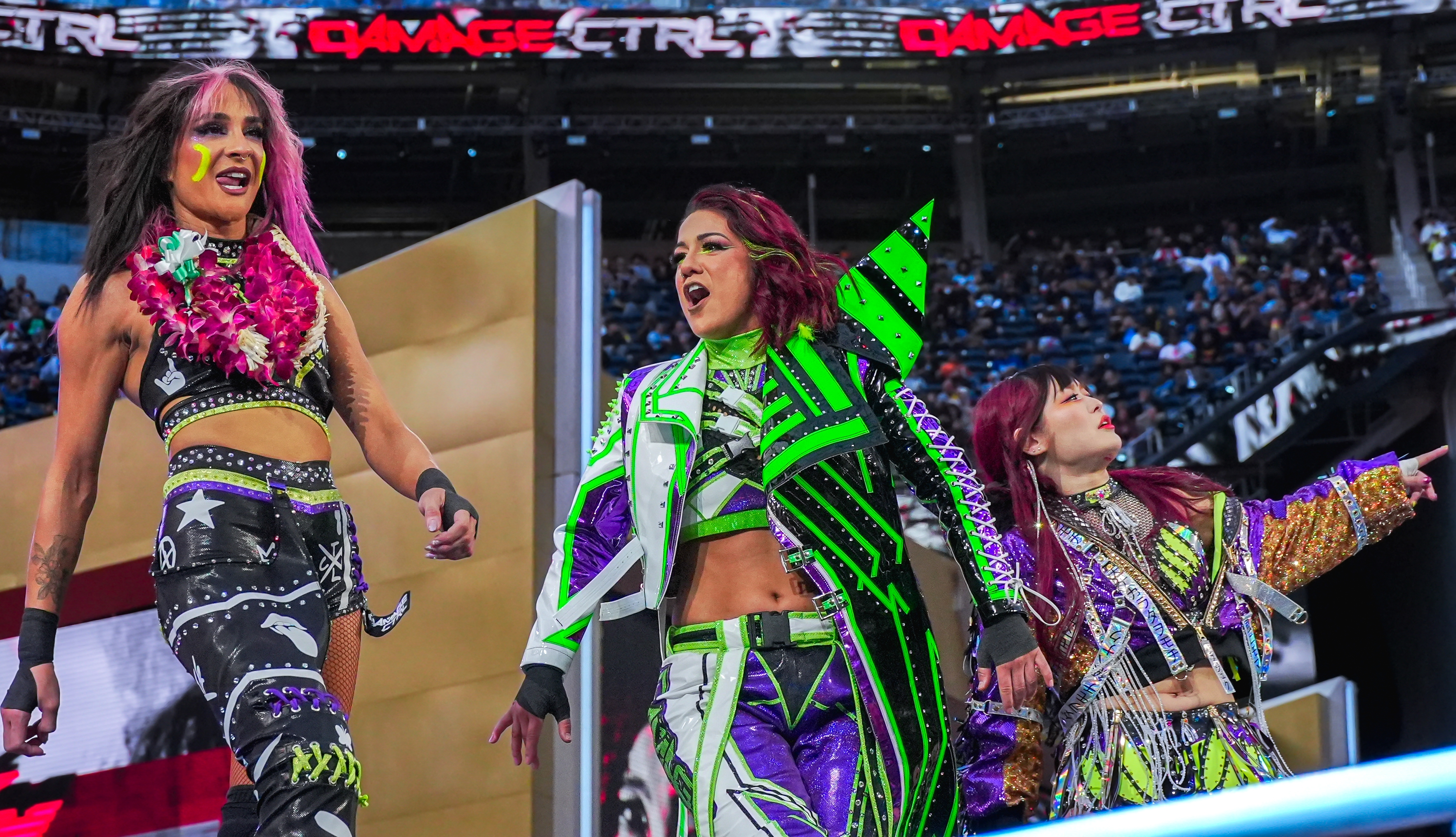
Damage CTRL making their entrance at WrestleMania 39.

On July 30, 2022, Shirai, under the new ring name IYO SKY, made her return from injury at SummerSlam alongside Bayley and Kai, with the three being allies and confronting Raw Women's Champion Bianca Belair; she subsequently joined the Raw brand as a heel. On the following episode of Raw, the trio targeted and attacked Becky Lynch, Alexa Bliss, and Asuka (formerly Kana). In her debut match, Sky faced Belair in a non-title match, which ended in a no-contest due to interference from Asuka, Bliss, Kai and Bayley. The following week, the trio challenged Asuka, Belair and Bliss to a six-woman tag team match at Clash at the Castle. Sky and Kai then participated in a tournament for the vacant WWE Women's Tag Team Championship and made it to the finals, where they lost to Aliyah and Raquel Rodriguez. At Clash at the Castle on September 3, the stable of Sky, Bayley and Kai was named as Damage CTRL, defeating Belair's team. On the September 12 episode of Raw, Sky and Kai defeated Aliyah and Rodriguez in a rematch to win the championship. They lost the titles to Asuka and Bliss on the October 31 episode of Raw, ending their reign at 48 days, but reclaimed them in a rematch on November 5 at Crown Jewel, marking the first time a women's championship changed hands in the Middle East. At Survivor Series WarGames on November 26, Damage CTRL, Rhea Ripley, and Nikki Cross lost to Belair, Asuka, Bliss, Mia Yim and Becky Lynch in a WarGames match. On the December 16 episode of SmackDown, Sky and Kai retained their titles against Liv Morgan and Tegan Nox.

On January 28, 2023, Sky participated in the women's Royal Rumble match at the titular event, eliminating five wrestlers, four of which were done by her, Bayley, and Kai, before being eliminated by Lynch. On the February 27 episode of Raw, Sky and Kai lost the Women's Tag Team Championship to Lynch and Lita, ending their second reign at 114 days. The feud resulted in a six-woman tag team match at WrestleMania 39 on April 1, where Lynch, Lita, and Trish Stratus defeated Damage CTRL.

==== WWE Women's Champion (2023–2024) ====
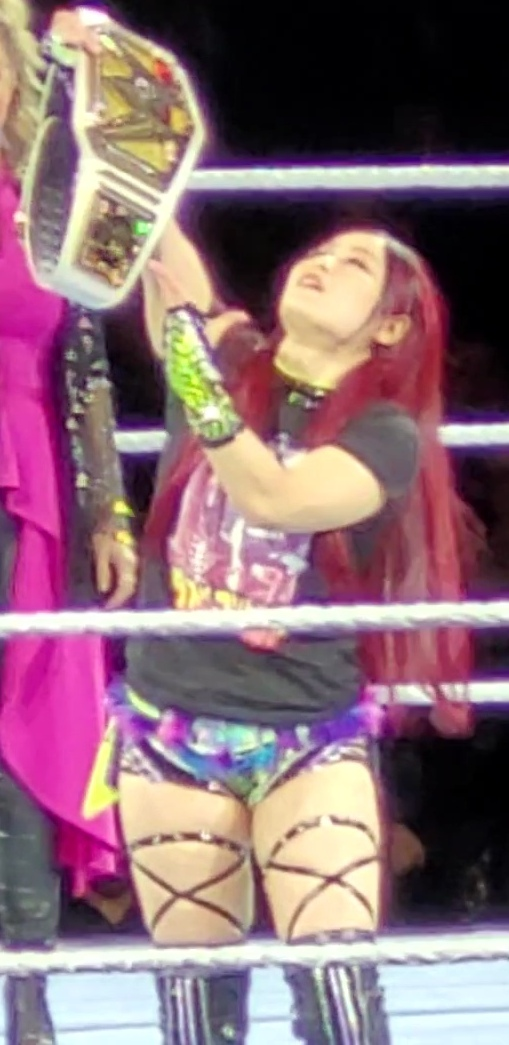
Sky as WWE Women's Champion in 2023

On the April 10 episode of Raw, Sky defeated Yim and Piper Niven in a triple threat match to become the number one contender for the Raw Women's Championship against Belair at Backlash on May 6, where she failed to win the title. As part of the 2023 WWE Draft, Damage CTRL were drafted to the SmackDown brand. At Money in the Bank on July 1, Sky competed in the women's Money in the Bank ladder match. During the match, Bayley interrupted Sky in retrieving the Money in the Bank briefcase, and in retaliation, Sky handcuffed Bayley to Lynch before grabbing the briefcase.

On August 5, at SummerSlam, Sky cashed in her Money in the Bank contract on Belair following a triple threat match involving Asuka and Charlotte Flair to win the WWE Women's Championship. She successfully defended the title against Zelina Vega in her first defense on the August 25 episode of SmackDown. Sky retained the title against Asuka on the September 22 episode of SmackDown and in a triple threat match also involving Flair at Fastlane on October 7. On the October 20 episode of SmackDown, after retaining the title against Flair, she was attacked by the returning Belair, whom Sky defeated to retain the title on November 4 at Crown Jewel with the help of a returning Kairi Sane. At Survivor Series WarGames on November 25, Damage CTRL (which now included Asuka) lost to Belair, Flair, Lynch and Shotzi in a WarGames match. At SmackDown: New Year's Revolution on January 5, 2024, Sky defeated Mia Yim to retain the title. After stablemate Bayley won the 2024 Women’s Royal Rumble, Sky and the rest of Damage CTRL turned on Bayley after she confronted them for talking about her behind her back, kicking her out of the group. Bayley then announced she would challenge Sky for the WWE Women’s Championship at WrestleMania XL. On Night 2 of WrestleMania XL on April 7, Sky lost the title to Bayley, ending her reign at 246 days.

==== Women's World Champion (2024–2025) ====
As part of the 2024 WWE Draft, Sky was drafted to the Raw brand with the rest of Damage CTRL. In May, Sky competed in the Queen of the Ring tournament, defeating Natalya in the first round, Shayna Baszler in the quarterfinals, but lost to Lyra Valkyria in the semifinals. At Money in the Bank on July 6, she competed in the namesake ladder match, which was won by Tiffany Stratton. On the July 29 episode of Raw, Sky and the rest of Damage CTRL turned face when they began feuding with Pure Fusion Collective (Baszler, Zoey Stark and Sonya Deville). Over the following months, Sky and Sane began pursuing the Women's Tag Team Championship, but failed to win the titles on the October 14 episode of Raw and in a fatal four-way tag team match at Crown Jewel on November 2. The following week on Raw, Sky won a battle royal to become the number one contender for the Women's World Championship. On November 30, at Survivor Series WarGames, Sky, Bayley, Belair, Naomi and Ripley defeated The Judgment Day (Liv Morgan and Rodriguez), Candice LeRae, Nia Jax and Stratton in a WarGames match. At Saturday Night's Main Event on December 14, Sky failed to win the title from Morgan. On February 1, at Royal Rumble, she entered the titular match as the first entrant, eliminating Deville before being eliminated by Jax. Sky lasted 1:06:45, breaking Bayley's 2024 record, before it was broken by Morgan (1:07:00) and Roxanne Perez (1:07:47) that same night.

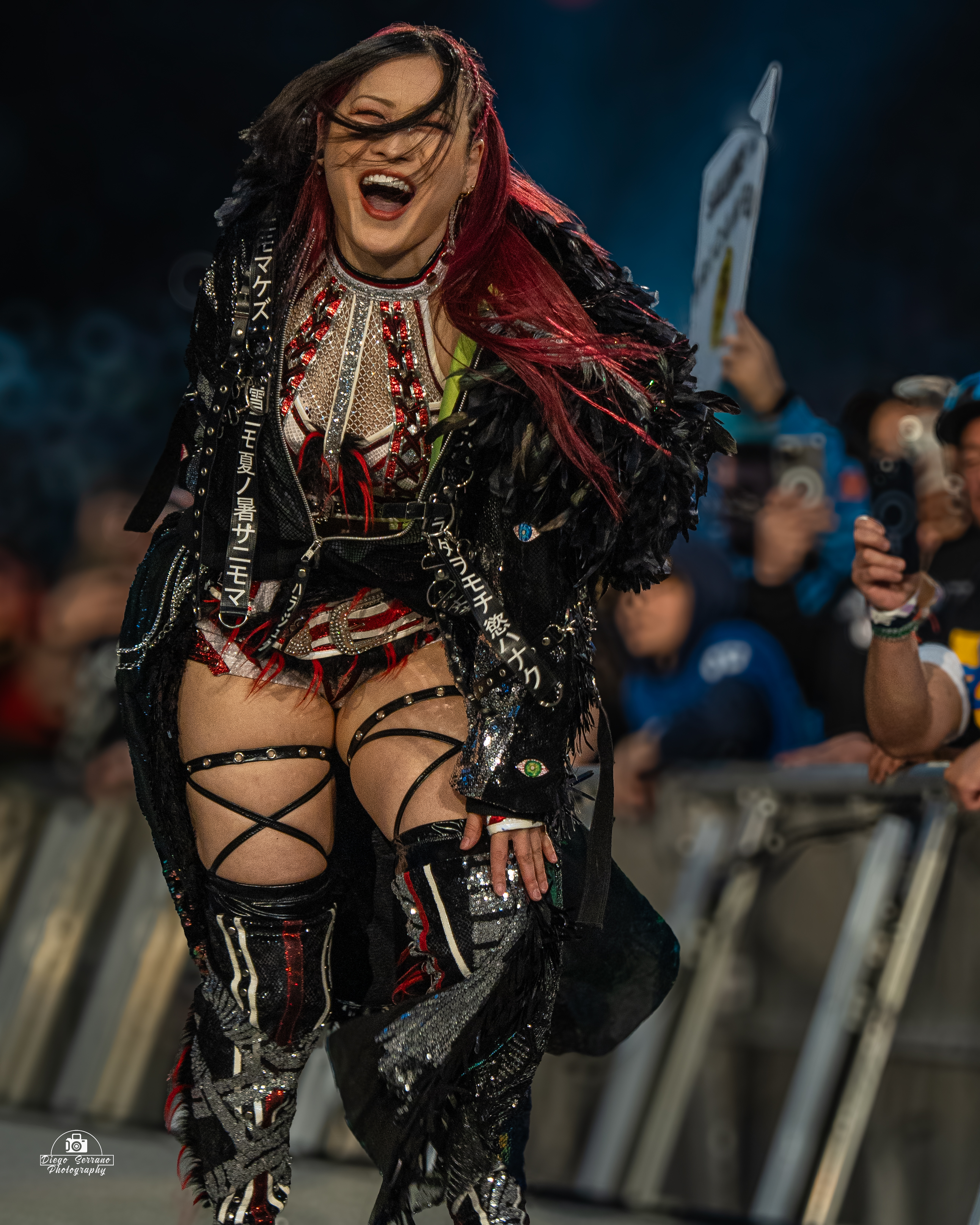
Sky making her entrance at the 2025 Royal Rumble

On the March 3 episode of Raw, Sky defeated Ripley to win the Women's World Championship. This win made Sky the seventh women’s Grand Slam champion, the tenth women’s Triple Crown champion in WWE, and the first wrestler to become a Grand Slam champion in Japan and America. On the March 31 episode of Raw, Sky defended the title against Ripley with Belair as the special guest referee, but the match ended in a double disqualification. This led to a triple threat match on Night 2 of WrestleMania 41 on April 20, where Sky retained the title. Dave Meltzer of the Wrestling Observer Newsletter rated the match five stars, making it the first women’s match in WWE history to receive such a rating. In May 2025, Damage CTRL quietly disbanded after the release of Dakota Kai. At Evolution on July 13, Sky lost the title to Naomi, as she successfully cashed in her Money in the Bank briefcase during Sky's title defense against Ripley, ending her reign at 132 days. On Night 2 of SummerSlam on August 3, Sky failed to regain the title from Naomi in a triple threat match also involving Ripley, whom Naomi pinned. After Naomi relinquished the championship due to pregnancy, Sky once again failed to win the vacant Women's World Championship at Wrestlepalooza on September 20, losing to Stephanie Vaquer.

==== Rhiyo and various feuds (2025–present) ====
At Crown Jewel on October 11, Sky teamed with Ripley to defeat The Kabuki Warriors (Asuka and Kairi Sane). During this time, Sky and Ripley became an official tag team dubbed "Rhiyo" (a portmanteau of their first names). At Survivor Series: WarGames on November 29, Sky along with Ripley, AJ Lee, Alexa Bliss, and Charlotte Flair defeated Asuka, Sane, Becky Lynch, Lash Legend, and Nia Jax in a WarGames match. On the January 5, 2026 episode of Raw, Rhiyo defeated The Kabuki Warriors to win the WWE Women's Tag Team Championship. At Saturday Night’s Main Event XLIII on January 24, Rhiyo retained the titles against The Judgment Day's Liv Morgan and Roxanne Perez. At the Royal Rumble event on January 31, Sky entered the namesake match as entrant #20, eliminating Sane before being eliminated by Lash Legend. On the February 27 episode of SmackDown, Rhiyo lost the titles to The Irresistible Forces (Jax and Legend), ending their reign at 53 days. At Night 2 of WrestleMania 42 on April 19, Sky assisted Ripley in helping her win the WWE Women’s Championship. Following WrestleMania, Ripley was moved to the SmackDown brand, effectively disbanding Rhiyo.

At Backlash on May 9, Sky defeated Asuka, ending their feud. At Night of Champions on June 27, Sky won the Queen of the Ring tournament by defeating Women's World Champion Liv Morgan and announced that she would be facing her for her title at SummerSlam. At the event on Night 1 on August 1, Sky was unsuccessful in capturing the title from Morgan. On the November 16 episode of Raw, Sky defeated Raquel Rodriguez to win the WWE Women's Intercontinental Championship.

=== Dream Star Fighting Marigold (2024–2025) ===
On June 11, 2024, it was announced by upstart Japanese promotion Dream Star Fighting Marigold that Sky would appear at the Marigold Summer Destiny event to challenge Utami Hayashishita in a dream match. At the event on July 13, Sky defeated Hayashishita. On October 26, 2025 at Marigold Grand Destiny, she faced and defeated Mayu Iwatani.

== Professional wrestling style, persona, and legacy ==
As both Io Shirai and Iyo Sky, Odate performs a mixture of technical and high-flying styles, with her knowledge of the latter style earning her the moniker "The Genius of the Sky". She noted that her professional wrestling persona is inspired by Rey Mysterio.

In 2016, Dave Meltzer of the Wrestling Observer Newsletter referred to Odate and her compatriots Kairi Sane and Mayu Iwatani as "three of the best wrestlers in the world".

== Other media ==
In March 2017, Odate was featured in a gravure spread on the Weekly Playboy magazine. Odate appeared as a playable character in video games WWE 2K20 and WWE 2K22 as Io Shirai. She later appeared in WWE 2K23, WWE 2K24, WWE 2K25, and WWE 2K26 as Iyo Sky.

== Personal life ==
Odate has an older sister, fellow professional wrestler Mio Shirai. Odate has extreme myopia and is considered legally blind without contacts or glasses. Odate is a fan of fellow professional wrestler Hiroshi Tanahashi and Japanese idol group Momoiro Clover Z.

On May 17, 2026, Odate married fellow professional wrestler Takaaki Watanabe, better known by his ring name Evil.

=== Legal issues ===
Odate was previously in a relationship with fellow professional wrestler Kazushige Nosawa, and the two lived together in Koto, Tokyo. On May 23, 2012, Odate and Nosawa were arrested at the Narita International Airport in Narita, Chiba upon their return from Mexico under suspicion of trying to smuggle 75 grams of marijuana, hidden inside paintings of the two, into the country. Both Odate and Nosawa denied the charges, claiming that the paintings were gifts from fans. Odate was released from a detention center on June 12. On June 21, Odate held a press conference, publicly apologizing to her fans, employers and co-workers, while again denying the charges. Odate also revealed that she had not considered retirement, but wanted to work again and regain the trust of her peers and fans, while also revealing that she and Nosawa had ended their relationship. On June 28, Japan's public prosecutor's office decided not to prosecute Odate over the incident. On July 9, Mexico-based Japanese wrestler Takuya Sugi held a press conference and confessed to planting the drugs on Odate and Nosawa.

== Championships and accomplishments ==
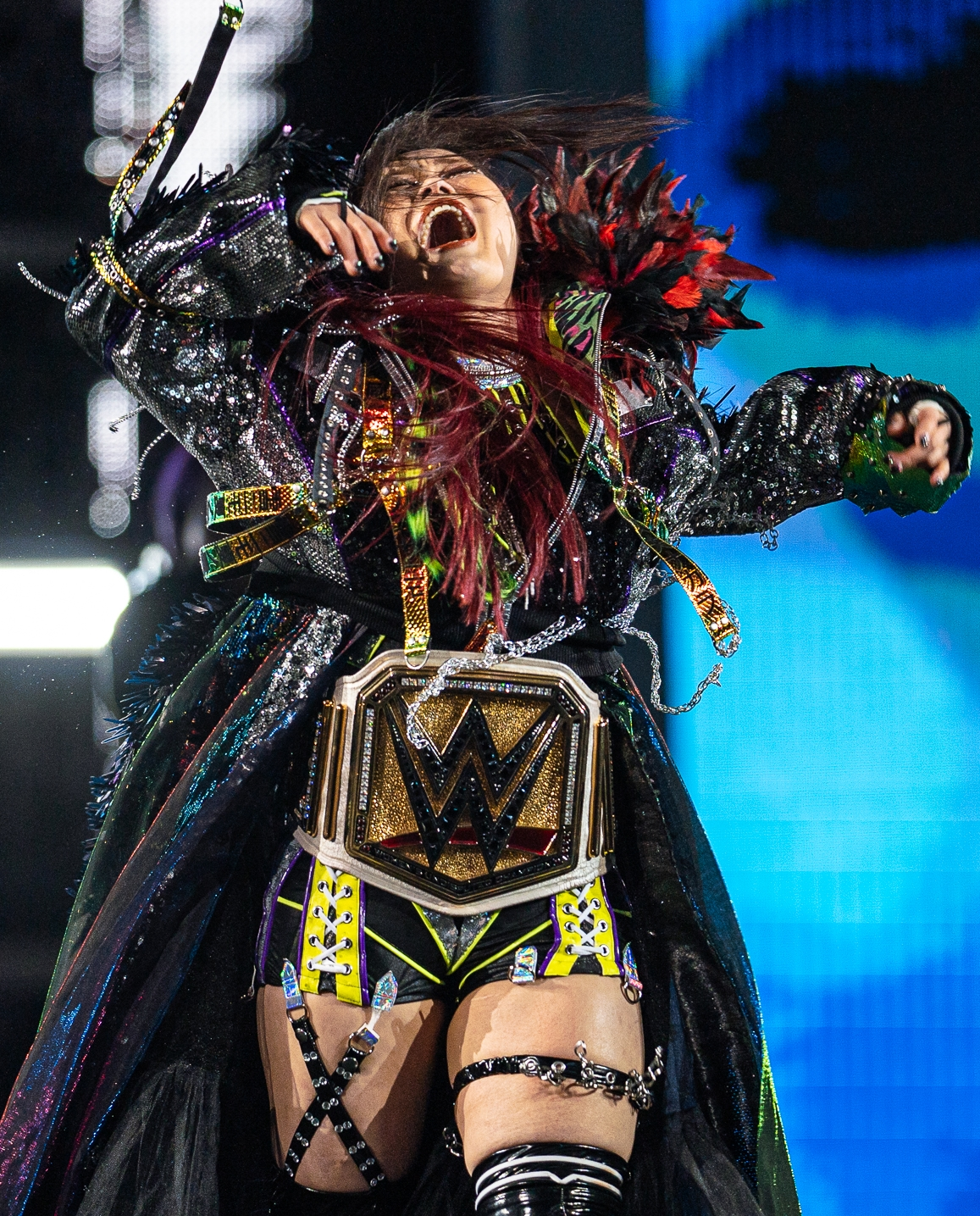
Odate, as Iyo Sky, is a former one-time WWE Women's Champion.

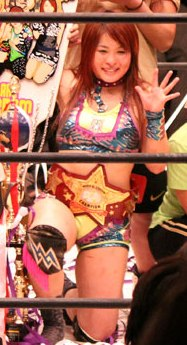
Odate, as Io Shirai, is a two-time World of Stardom Champion.

- Dream Star Fighting Marigold
  - Marigold Year-End Award (1 time)
    - Best Match Award (2025) vs. Mayu Iwatani on October 26
- JWP Joshi Puroresu
  - 5th Junior All Star Photogenic Award (2007) – with Mio Shirai
- Pro Wrestling Illustrated
  - Ranked No. 4 of the top 100 female wrestlers in the PWI Women's 100 in 2018
- Pro Wrestling Wave
  - TLW World Young Women's Tag Team Championship (1 time) – with Mio Shirai
  - Captain's Fall Six Person Tag Team Tournament (2009) – with Gami and Mio Shirai
  - TLW World Young Women's Tag Team Tournament (2009) – with Mio Shirai
- Sports Illustrated
  - Match of the Year (2025) vs Rhea Ripley vs Bianca Belair at WrestleMania 41
  - Ranked No. 7 of the top 10 wrestlers in 2020
- Tokyo Sports
  - Joshi Puroresu Grand Prize (2015, 2016, and 2017)
- World Wonder Ring Stardom
  - Artist of Stardom Championship (6 times) – with Mayu Iwatani and Takumi Iroha (1), Kairi Hojo and Mayu Iwatani (1), HZK and Momo Watanabe (1), AZM and HZK (2), and HZK and Viper (1)
  - Goddesses of Stardom Championship (1 time) – with Mayu Iwatani
  - High Speed Championship (1 time)
  - SWA World Championship (1 time, inaugural)
  - Wonder of Stardom Championship (2 times)
  - World of Stardom Championship (2 times)
  - First World Wonder Ring Stardom Grand Slam Champion
  - Artist of Stardom Championship Tournament (2017) – with AZM and HZK
  - Goddesses of Stardom Championship Tournament (2015) – with Mayu Iwatani
  - Goddesses of Stardom Tag League (2015) – with Mayu Iwatani
  - Red Belt Challenger Tournament (2013)
  - SWA World Championship Tournament (2016)
  - 5★Star GP (2014)
  - 5★Star GP Award (4 times)
    - 5★Star GP Best Match Award (2015) vs. Mayu Iwatani on August 23
    - 5★Star GP Best Match Award (2016) vs. Kairi Hojo on September 3
    - 5★Star GP Technique Award (2013, 2017)
  - Stardom Year-End Awards (8 times)
    - Best Match Award (2015) vs. Meiko Satomura on December 23
    - Best Match Award (2016) vs. Mayu Iwatani on December 22
    - Best Match Award (2018) with Mayu Iwatani vs. Kagetsu and Hazuki on June 17
    - Best Tag Team Award (2015) with Mayu Iwatani
    - MVP Award (2013, 2014, 2016)
    - Outstanding Performance Award (2017)
- WWE
  - WWE Women's Championship (1 time)
  - Women's World Championship (1 time)
  - WWE Women's Intercontinental Championship (1 time, current)
  - WWE Women's Tag Team Championship (3 times) – with Dakota Kai (2) and Rhea Ripley (1)
  - NXT Women's Championship (1 time)
  - NXT Women's Tag Team Championship (1 time) – with Zoey Stark
  - Queen of the Ring (2026)
  - Women's Money in the Bank (2023)
  - Tenth WWE Women's Triple Crown Champion
  - Seventh WWE Women's Grand Slam Champion
  - Women's Dusty Rhodes Tag Team Classic (2022) – with Kay Lee Ray
  - NXT Year-End Award (3 times)
    - Future Star of NXT (2018)
    - Female Competitor of the Year (2020)
    - Overall Competitor of the Year (2020)
- Other championships
  - Americas World Mixed Tag Team Championship (1 time) – with Nosawa

== Luchas de Apuestas record ==
Winner (wager)	Loser (wager)	Location	Event	Date	Notes
Io Shirai (hair)	La Maléfica (mask)	Pachuca, Hidalgo, Mexico	Live event	November 1, 2011	
