= List of WWE Women's Champions =

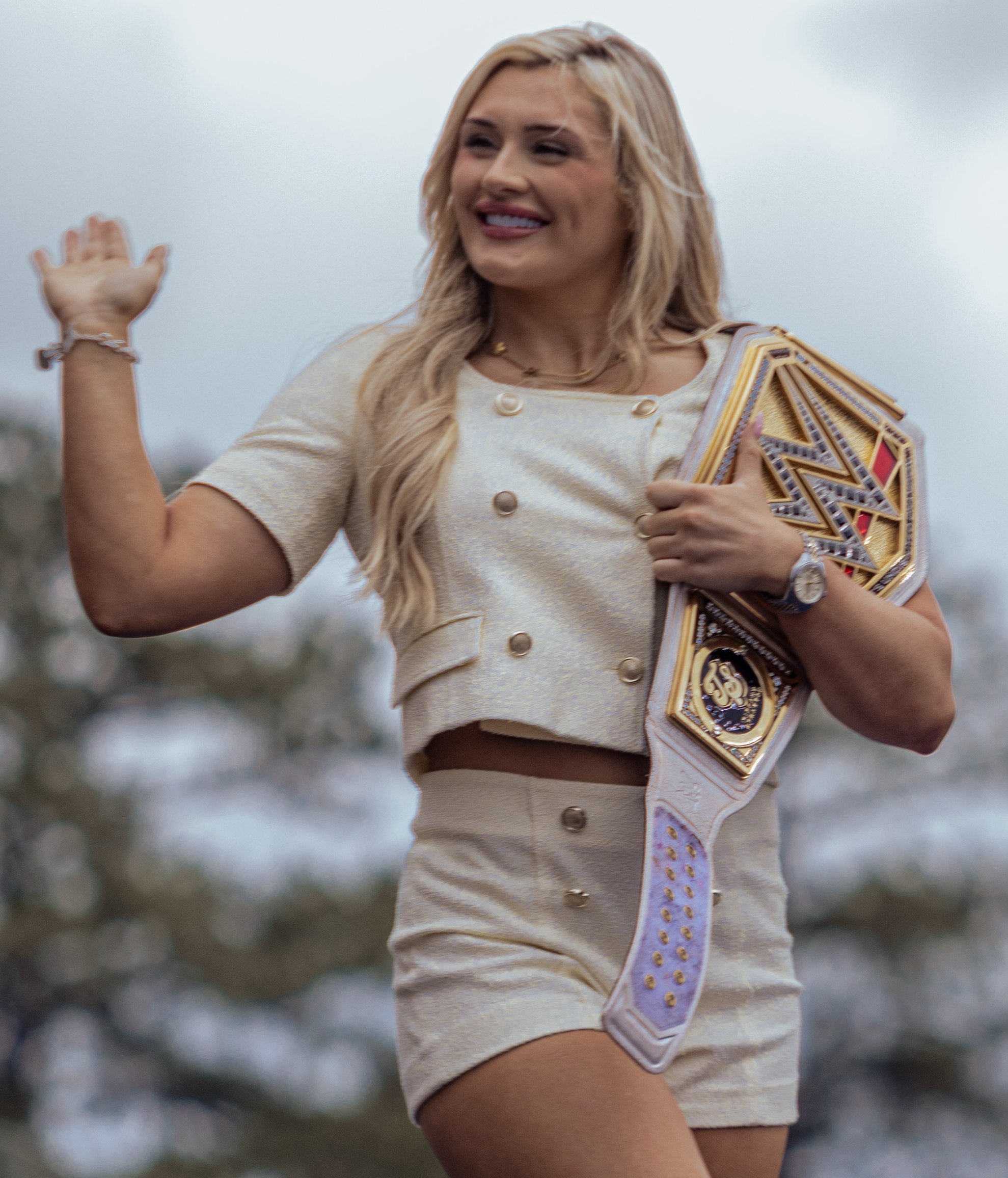
Current and two-time champion Tiffany Stratton

The WWE Women's Championship is a women's professional wrestling world championship created and promoted by the American professional wrestling promotion WWE, defended on the SmackDown brand. It was introduced on April 3, 2016, at WrestleMania 32 to replace the WWE Divas Championship and has a unique title history separate from the original WWE Women's Championship. Following the reintroduction of the brand split in July 2016, the title became exclusive to Raw and was renamed as the Raw Women's Championship after SummerSlam in August 2016 when SmackDown created the SmackDown Women's Championship as a counterpart title. As a result of the 2023 WWE Draft, the championships switched brands. In June 2023, the Raw Women's Championship reverted to its original name of WWE Women's Championship while the SmackDown Women's Championship became the Women's World Championship.

The championship is generally contested in professional wrestling matches, in which participants execute scripted finishes rather than contend in direct competition. Tiffany Stratton is the current champion in her second reign. She won the title by defeating Chelsea Green in Stratton's Money in the Bank cash-in match at Crown Jewel in Riyadh, Saudi Arabia on November 7, 2026.

As of November 11, 2026, there have been 34 reigns between 15 champions. The first champion was Charlotte Flair, then known simply as Charlotte, who won the title at WrestleMania 32. She also has the most reigns with six. Bianca Belair's first reign is the longest at 420 days (419 as recognized by WWE), while her second is the shortest at 1 minute, 35 seconds. Becky Lynch has the longest combined reign across her two reigns at 535 days (559 as recognized by WWE). Asuka is the oldest champion, having won the title at 41 years, 243 days old, while Sasha Banks is the youngest when she won it at 24. Two women in history have held the championship for a continuous reign of one year (365 days) or more: Becky Lynch and Bianca Belair.

== Title history ==
=== Names ===
Name	Years
WWE Women's Championship	April 3, 2016 – September 5, 2016
WWE Raw Women's Championship	September 5, 2016 – June 9, 2023
WWE Women's Championship	June 9, 2023 – present

=== Reigns ===
Key
No.	Overall reign number
Reign	Reign number for the specific champion
Days	Number of days held
Days recog.	Number of days held recognized by the promotion
<1	Reign lasted less than a day
+	Current reign is changing daily

No.	Champion	Championship change			Reign statistics			Notes	Ref.
No.	Champion	Date	Event	Location	Reign	Days	Days recog.	Notes	Ref.
WWE
1	Charlotte	April 3, 2016	WrestleMania 32	Arlington, TX	1	113	113	The title was established as the WWE Women's Championship at WrestleMania 32, to replace the WWE Divas Championship. Charlotte, the reigning Divas Champion, defeated Becky Lynch and Sasha Banks in a triple threat match to become the inaugural champion. The title became exclusive to the Raw brand following the 2016 WWE Draft in July.	
WWE: Raw
2	Sasha Banks	July 25, 2016	Raw	Pittsburgh, PA	1	27	26		
3	Charlotte	August 21, 2016	SummerSlam	Brooklyn, NY	2	43	43	The title was renamed as the Raw Women's Championship on September 5, 2016, following the creation of the SmackDown Women's Championship for the SmackDown brand.	
4	Sasha Banks	October 3, 2016	Raw	Los Angeles, CA	2	27	27		
5	Charlotte Flair	October 30, 2016	Hell in a Cell	Boston, MA	3	29	29	This was a Hell in a Cell match. During her reign, Charlotte's ring name was lengthened to Charlotte Flair.	
6	Sasha Banks	November 28, 2016	Raw	Charlotte, NC	3	20	19	This was a falls count anywhere match.	
7	Charlotte Flair	December 18, 2016	Roadblock: End of the Line	Pittsburgh, PA	4	57	57	This was a 30-minute iron man match, which Flair won 3–2 in sudden death overtime.	
8	Bayley	February 13, 2017	Raw	Paradise, NV	1	76	75		
9	Alexa Bliss	April 30, 2017	Payback	San Jose, CA	1	112	111		
10	Sasha Banks	August 20, 2017	SummerSlam	Brooklyn, NY	4	8	8		
11	Alexa Bliss	August 28, 2017	Raw	Memphis, TN	2	223	222		
12	Nia Jax	April 8, 2018	WrestleMania 34	New Orleans, LA	1	70	70		
13	Alexa Bliss	June 17, 2018	Money in the Bank	Rosemont, IL	3	63	63	This was Bliss' Money in the Bank cash-in match.	
14	Ronda Rousey	August 19, 2018	SummerSlam	Brooklyn, NY	1	232	231		
15	Becky Lynch	April 8, 2019	WrestleMania 35	East Rutherford, NJ	1	373	398	This was a winner takes all triple threat match for both the Raw Women's Championship and SmackDown Women's Championship, also involving Charlotte Flair, who defended the SmackDown Women's Championship. Lynch pinned Rousey to win both titles. WWE recognizes Lynch's reign as ending on May 10, 2020, due to tape delay.	
16	Asuka	April 16, 2020	Raw	Stamford, CT	1	95	77	The Money in the Bank briefcase was originally supposed to contain a guaranteed championship match contract, but after Becky Lynch forfeited the title due to her pregnancy, the title belt was given to Asuka by Becky in exchange for the briefcase on Raw. (A day before at Money in the Bank after Asuka defeated Carmella, Dana Brooke, Lacey Evans, Nia Jax, and Shayna Baszler in the women's Money in the Bank ladder match. WWE recognizes Asuka's reign as beginning on May 11, 2020 (A day after the Money in the Bank ladder match aired on tape delay) and ending on July 27, 2020 (also on tape delay).)	
17	Sasha Banks	July 20, 2020	Raw	Orlando, FL	5	34	26	Besides pinfall or submission, the title could also change hands by countout or disqualification; Banks won by countout. WWE recognizes Banks' reign as beginning on July 27, 2020, when the match aired on tape delay.	
18	Asuka	August 23, 2020	SummerSlam	Orlando, FL	2	231	231		
19	Rhea Ripley	April 11, 2021	WrestleMania 37; Night 2	Tampa, FL	1	98	97		
20	Charlotte Flair	July 18, 2021	Money in the Bank	Fort Worth, TX	5	1	2	WWE's official title history incorrectly lists her reign as lasting 2 days, ending on July 20, 2021.	
21	Nikki A.S.H.	July 19, 2021	Raw	Dallas, TX	1	33	32	This was Nikki A.S.H.'s Money in the Bank cash-in match.	
22	Charlotte Flair	August 21, 2021	SummerSlam	Paradise, NV	6	62	61	This was a triple threat match, also involving Rhea Ripley.	
23	Becky Lynch	October 22, 2021	SmackDown	Wichita, KS	2	162	161	As a result of the 2021 WWE Draft, then-SmackDown Women's Champion Becky Lynch was drafted to Raw while Charlotte Flair was drafted to SmackDown. To keep the titles on their respective brands, WWE had the two women exchange championships.	
24	Bianca Belair	April 2, 2022	WrestleMania 38; Night 1	Arlington, TX	1	420	419	The title became exclusive to the SmackDown brand following the 2023 WWE Draft.	
WWE: SmackDown
25	Asuka	May 27, 2023	Night of Champions	Jeddah, Saudi Arabia	3	70	70	The title's name reverted to WWE Women's Championship on June 9, 2023.	
26	Bianca Belair	August 5, 2023	SummerSlam	Detroit, MI	2	<1	<1	This was a triple threat match, also involving Charlotte Flair.	
27	Iyo Sky	August 5, 2023	SummerSlam	Detroit, MI	1	246	245	This was Sky's Money in the Bank cash-in match.	
28	Bayley	April 7, 2024	WrestleMania XL; Night 2	Philadelphia, PA	2	118	117		
29	Nia Jax	August 3, 2024	SummerSlam	Cleveland, OH	2	153	153		
30	Tiffany Stratton	January 3, 2025	SmackDown	Phoenix, AZ	1	302	301	This was Stratton's Money in the Bank cash-in match.	
31	Jade Cargill	November 1, 2025	Saturday Night's Main Event	Salt Lake City, UT	1	169	169		
32	Rhea Ripley	April 19, 2026	WrestleMania 42; Night 2	Paradise, NV	2	145	104	Ripley won the title as a member of the Raw brand and was subsequently transferred to SmackDown after the title win.	
33	Chelsea Green	August 2, 2026	SummerSlam; Night 2	Minneapolis, MN	1	97	96	Due to Rhea Ripley suffering an injury, an interim champion was crowned. Green defeated Charlotte Flair, Jade Cargill, Lash Legend, and Tiffany Stratton in a five-way ladder match to become the interim champion. On September 11, WWE retroactively ended Ripley's reign, making Green the lineal champion. Green's reign is recognized since August 2, 2026 the date that Green first became interim at SummerSlam.	
34	Tiffany Stratton	November 7, 2026	Crown Jewel	Riyadh, Saudi Arabia	2	4+	4+	This was Stratton's Money in the Bank cash-in match.	

== Combined reigns ==
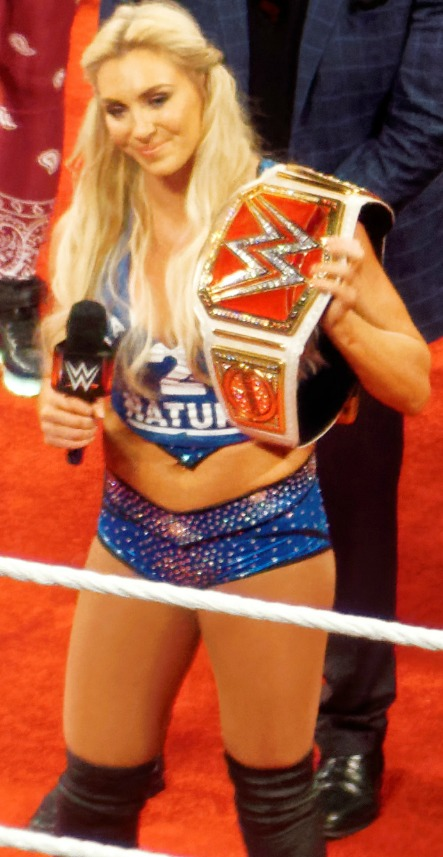
Inaugural and record six-time champion Charlotte Flair

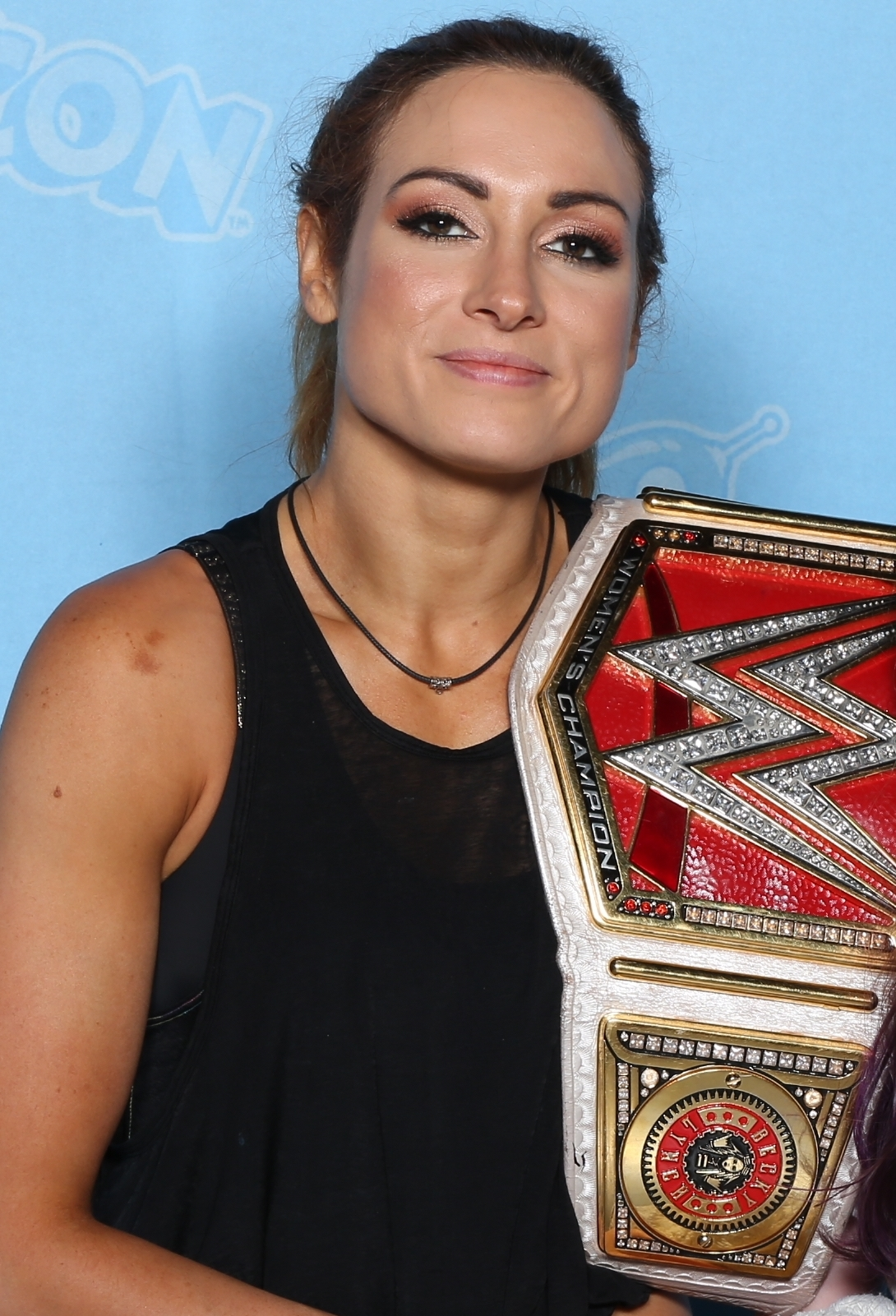
Two-time champion Becky Lynch, who has the longest combined reign at 535 days (559 as recognized by WWE)

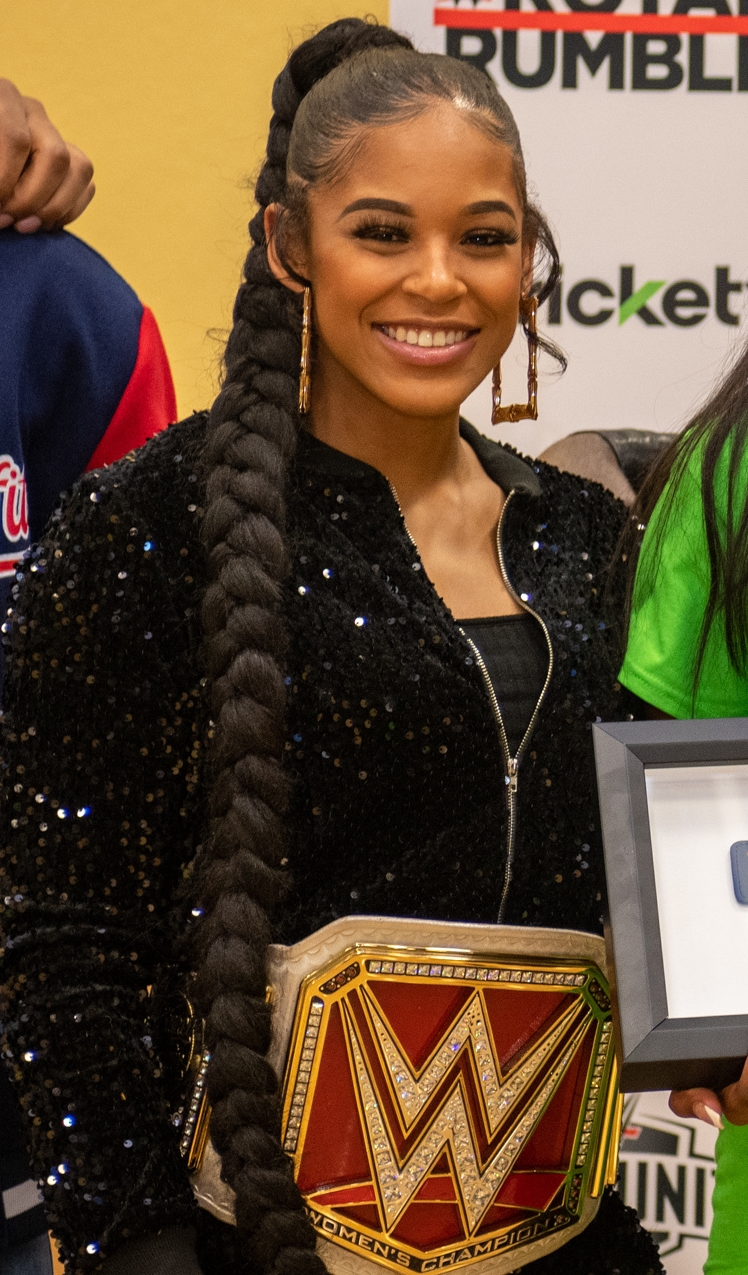
Two-time and longest-reigning champion Bianca Belair; her first reign lasted 420 days (419 as recognized by WWE). Her second reign is also the shortest reign at 1 minute and 35 seconds.

As of November 11, 2026.

†	Indicates the current champion

Rank	Wrestler	No. of reigns	Combined days	Combined days rec. by WWE
1	Becky Lynch	2	535	559
2	Bianca Belair	2	420	419
3	Alexa Bliss	3	398	399
4	Asuka	3	397	377
5	Tiffany Stratton †	2	306+	305+
6	Charlotte Flair	6	305	
7	Iyo Sky	1	246	245
8	Ronda Rousey	1	232	231
9	Nia Jax	2	223	
10	Rhea Ripley	2	244	201
11	Bayley	2	194	192
12	Jade Cargill	1	169	
13	Sasha Banks	5	116	106
14	Chelsea Green	1	97	
15	Nikki A.S.H.	1	33	32
