= King and Queen of the Ring (2026) =

Professional wrestling tournaments by WWE

- King and Queen of the Ring logo
- Promotion: WWE
- Brand(s): Raw; SmackDown
- Date: June 1 – June 27, 2026

King & Queen of the Ring tournament chronology
← Previous; 2025	Next → —

King of the Ring
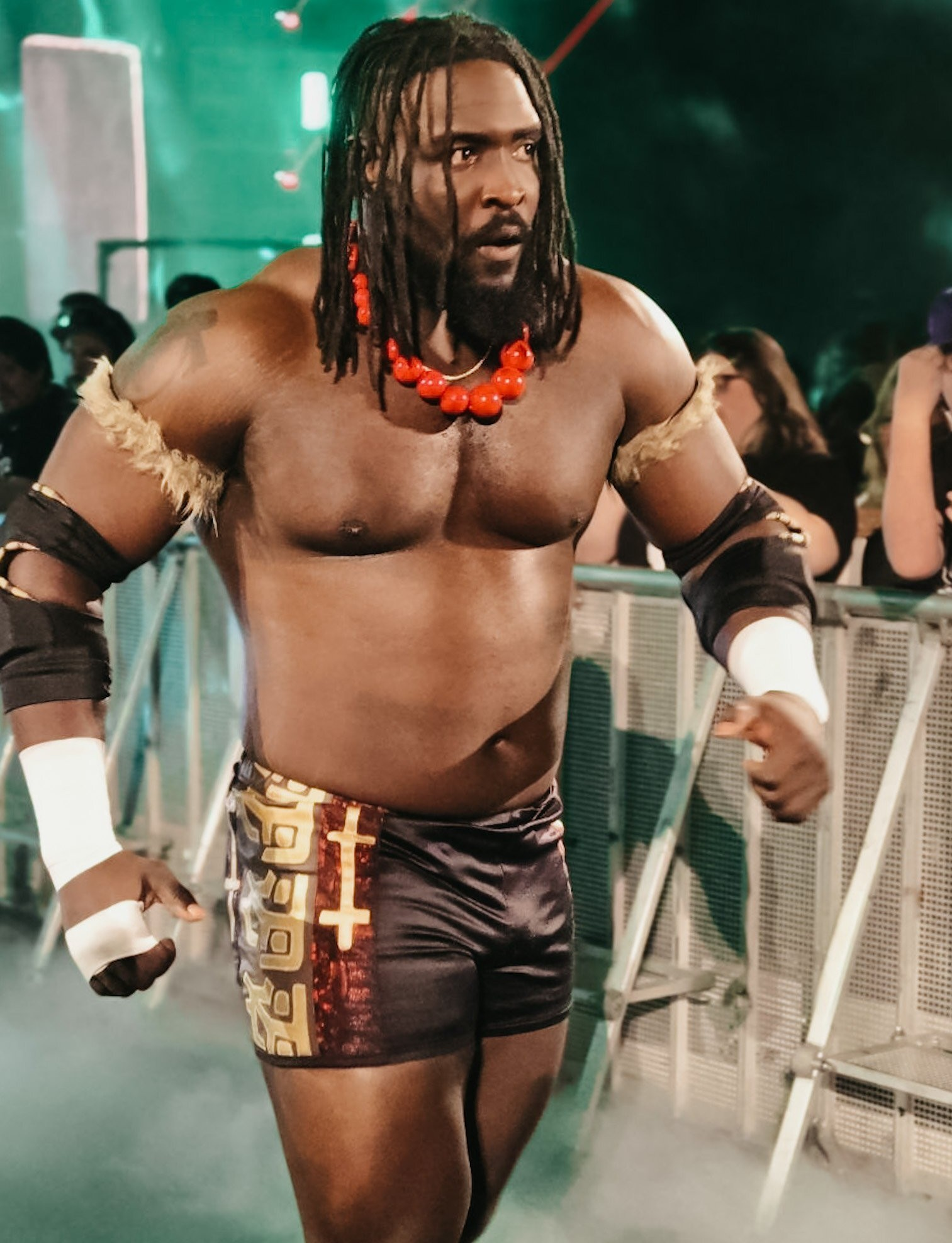
- 2026 King of the Ring winner Oba Femi

Tournament information
- Sport: Professional wrestling
- Location: United States; France; Italy; Saudi Arabia
- Dates: June 1, 2026–June 27, 2026
- Tournament format: Single elimination tournament
- Participants: 16

Final positions
- Champion: Oba Femi
- Runner-up: Jey Uso

Tournament statistics
- Matches played: 7

Queen of the Ring
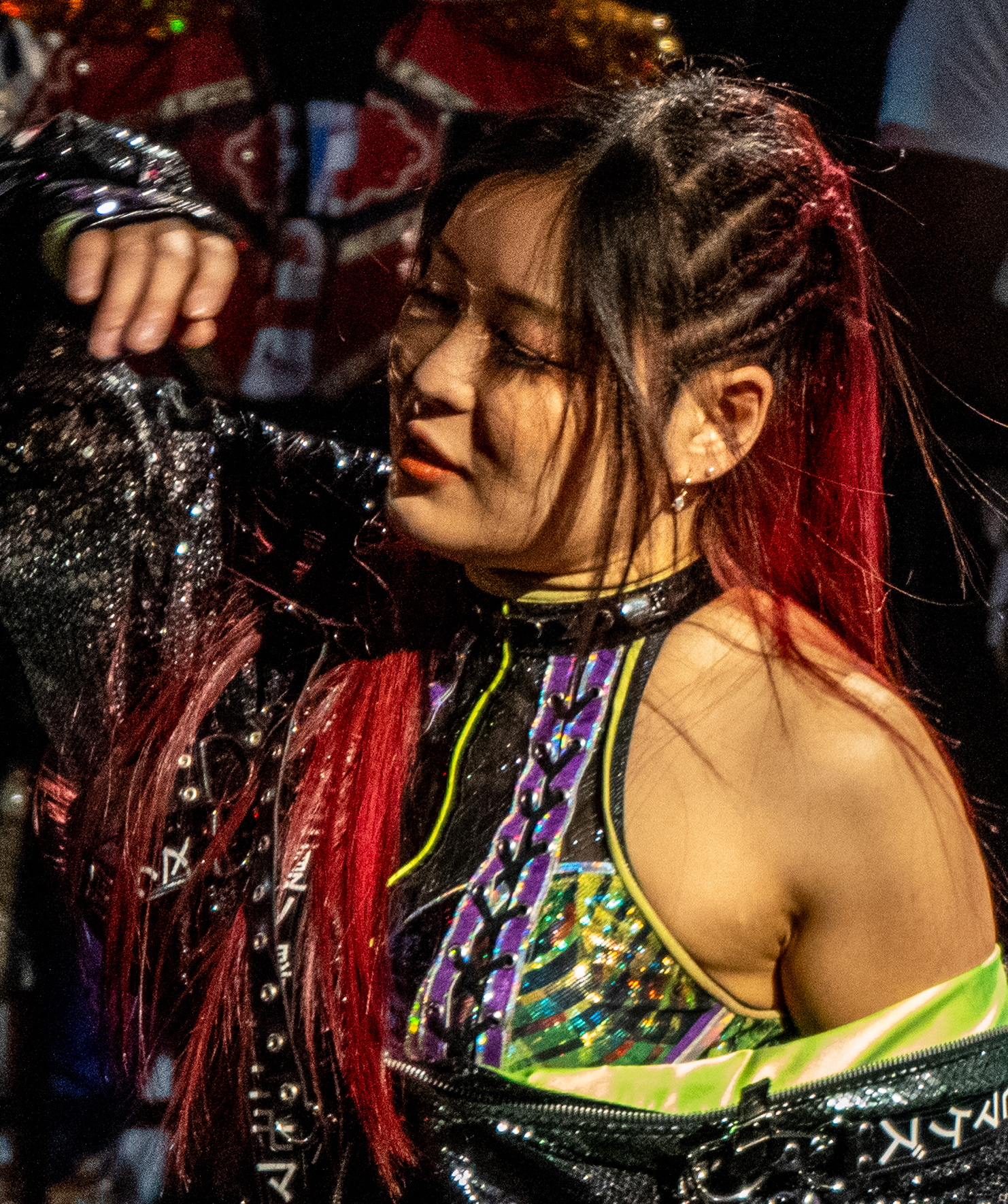
- 2026 Queen of the Ring winner Iyo Sky

Tournament information
- Sport: Professional wrestling
- Location: United States; France; Italy; Saudi Arabia
- Dates: June 1, 2026–June 27, 2026
- Tournament format: Single elimination tournament
- Participants: 16

Final positions
- Champion: Iyo Sky
- Runner-up: Liv Morgan

Tournament statistics
- Matches played: 7

The 2026 King and Queen of the Ring were respective men's and women's professional wrestling tournaments produced by the American company WWE. This was the 25th edition of the men's King of the Ring tournament and fourth edition of the women's Queen of the Ring tournament that took place from June 1 to June 27, 2026, each held between wrestlers from the Raw and SmackDown brand divisions. The respective winners were crowned "King of the Ring" and "Queen of the Ring" and received a world championship match of their choice at SummerSlam. Both sets of finals were held between Raw wrestlers; in the King of the Ring final, Oba Femi defeated Jey Uso, while in the Queen of the Ring final, Iyo Sky defeated Liv Morgan, who entered the tournament despite holding Raw's Women's World Championship. Femi relinquished his title match to instead face Brock Lesnar in a Hell in a Cell match at SummerSlam, while Sky chose to challenge Morgan for the Women's World Championship at the event.

Tournament matches began on the June 1, 2026, episode of Raw and continued to be held across episodes of Raw and SmackDown. The respective tournaments concluded at Night of Champions in Riyadh, Saudi Arabia on June 27, 2026.

== Background ==
King and Queen of the Ring are respective men's and women's professional wrestling tournaments periodically held by the American company WWE. The King of the Ring tournament was established in 1985 with Queen of the Ring introduced in 2021 (originally as Queen's Crown; renamed in 2024). The respective winners are crowned the "King of the Ring" and "Queen of the Ring", and since 2024, they also receive a world championship match at SummerSlam. In 2024 and 2025, the winners faced the world champion of their respective brand. From 1993 to 2002 and in 2015, the King of the Ring finals took place at the King of the Ring event, while in 2024, both tournament finals took place at the King and Queen of the Ring event, which was held in Jeddah, Saudi Arabia. For all other years the tournaments were held, the finals took place at another event.

The 25th King of the Ring and fourth Queen of the Ring tournaments were announced during the May 25, 2026, episode of Raw, with tournament matches beginning the following week on the June 1 episode of Raw and subsequently held across episodes of Raw and SmackDown. On May 31 during the Clash in Italy post-show, WWE announced the brackets for both tournaments, with first round matches consisting of fatal four-way matches with the winners advancing to the semi-finals, and then the winners of the semi-finals advancing to the finals at Night of Champions on June 27 in Riyadh, Saudi Arabia. This year's tournament also changed the rules in that the winners received a choice of which title to challenge for at SummerSlam. Despite holding Raw's Women's World Championship, Liv Morgan was entered into the Queen of the Ring tournament with her explaining that she wanted to win SmackDown's WWE Women's Championship to become a double world champion.

== Brackets ==
†	Raw	‡	SmackDown

=== King of the Ring ===
First Round; Raw; June 1–8, 2026; SmackDown; June 5–12, 2026
Penta	—
Oba Femi	Pinfall
Solo Sikoa	9:00
Carmelo Hayes	—
Dominik Mysterio	Pinfall
Bron Breakker	—
Trick Williams	—
Damian Priest	17:00
Seth Rollins	—
Je'Von Evans	Pinfall
Talla Tonga	—
Ricky Saints	15:15
Jey Uso	Pinfall
LA Knight	18:40
Royce Keys	—
Finn Bálor	—

Semifinals; Raw; June 15, 2026; SmackDown; June 19, 2026
Oba Femi	Pinfall
Dominik Mysterio	4:35
Je'Von Evans	17:55
Jey Uso	Pinfall

Final; Night of Champions; June 27, 2026
Oba Femi	Pinfall
Jey Uso	8:00

=== Queen of the Ring ===
First Round; Raw; June 1–8, 2026; SmackDown; June 5–12, 2026
Liv Morgan	Pinfall
Becky Lynch	—
Alexa Bliss	—
Chelsea Green	9:15
Sol Ruca	—
Lyra Valkyria	18:35
Charlotte Flair	Submission
Jade Cargill	—
Roxanne Perez	—
Iyo Sky	Pinfall
Giulia	10:40
Lash Legend	—
Bayley	—
Raquel Rodriguez	Pinfall
Jacy Jayne	—
Kiana James	14:05

Semifinals; Raw; June 15, 2026; SmackDown; June 19, 2026
Liv Morgan	Submission
Charlotte Flair	18:25
Iyo Sky	Pinfall
Raquel Rodriguez	10:15

Final; Night of Champions; June 27, 2026
Liv Morgan	14:55
Iyo Sky	Pinfall
