= Night of Champions (2026) =

WWE premium live event

Night of Champions ليلة الأبطال (Arabic)
- Promotional poster featuring Tiffany Stratton, Cody Rhodes, Liv Morgan, and Trick Williams
- Promotion: WWE
- Brand(s): Raw; SmackDown
- Date: June 27, 2026
- City: Riyadh, Saudi Arabia
- Venue: Kingdom Arena

WWE event chronology
| ← Previous; Clash in Italy | Next → NXT The Great American Bash |

Night of Champions chronology
| ← Previous; 2025 | Next → — |

King & Queen of the Ring tournament chronology
| ← Previous; 2025 | Next → — |

WWE in Saudi Arabia chronology
| ← Previous; Royal Rumble | Next → Crown Jewel |

The 2026 Night of Champions (Arabic: ليلة الأبطال, romanized: Laylat al-Abtal), also promoted as Night of Champions: Riyadh, was a professional wrestling premium live event (PLE) produced by the American company WWE, held for wrestlers from the promotion's main roster brands, Raw and SmackDown. It was the 12th Night of Champions and took place on Saturday, June 27, 2026, at the Kingdom Arena in Riyadh, Saudi Arabia for the second consecutive year, airing live at 8:00 p.m. Arabia Standard Time (1:00 p.m. Eastern Time). Night of Champions is characterized by featuring championship matches with the 2026 event also hosting the finals of both the 25th King of the Ring and fourth Queen of the Ring tournaments.

Six matches were contested at the event. In the main event, Sami Zayn defeated Gunther and defending champion Cody Rhodes in a triple threat match to win SmackDown's Undisputed WWE Championship, making him a Triple Crown Champion and Grand Slam Champion in the process. In other prominent matches, Iyo Sky defeated Liv Morgan, both from Raw, to win the Queen of the Ring tournament, and in the opening bout, Oba Femi defeated Jey Uso, also both from Raw, to win the King of the Ring tournament. For winning the respective King and Queen of the Ring tournaments, Femi and Sky earned a world championship match of their choice at SummerSlam; however, Femi relinquished his title match to face Brock Lesnar at the event.

This was the 15th major event WWE held in Saudi Arabia as part of its 10-year partnership in support of Saudi Vision 2030, as well as the first Night of Champions to livestream on ESPN Unlimited in the United States.

== Production ==
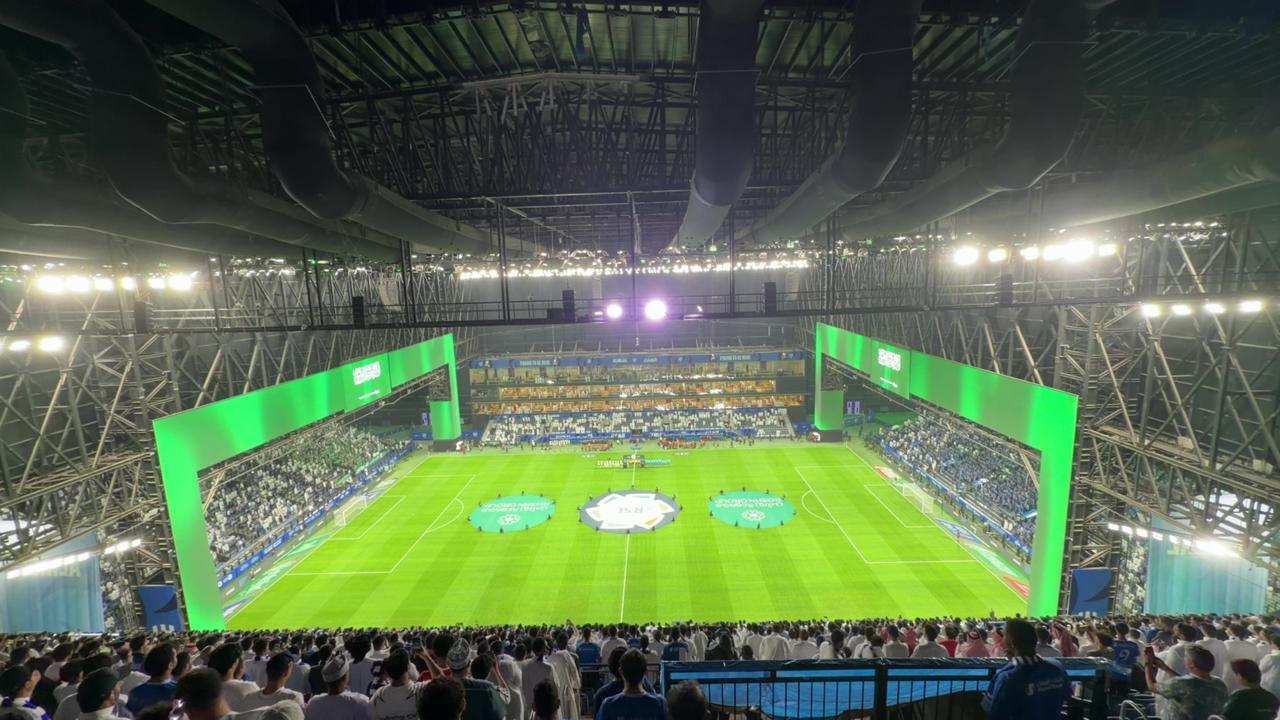
The 12th Night of Champions was the second consecutive year for the event to be held at the Kingdom Arena in Riyadh, Saudi Arabia.

=== Background ===
Night of Champions is a professional wrestling premium live event (PLE) produced by the American company WWE, established in 2007. It was held annually until 2015 and originally aired via pay-per-view (PPV) before it also began simulcasting on WWE's livestreaming platforms in 2014. Night of Champions was discontinued after the 2015 event, but it was reinstated in 2023; however, an event was not held in 2024. The event is characterized by having championship matches. In early 2018, WWE began a 10-year strategic multiplatform partnership with the Ministry of Sport (formerly General Sports Authority) in support of Saudi Vision 2030, Saudi Arabia's social and economic reform program. Upon its reinstatement in 2023, Night of Champions became a recurring PLE for Saudi Arabia.

On March 17, 2026, POST Wrestling reported that the 12th Night of Champions was internally scheduled for Saturday, June 27 in Saudi Arabia. The event's status was initially subject to speculation due to the 2026 Iranian strikes on Saudi Arabia; notably, Formula One had called off the 2026 Saudi Arabian Grand Prix due to the strikes. However, on April 23, WWE officially confirmed that the event would proceed as planned on June 27 at the Kingdom Arena in Riyadh and held for wrestlers from the Raw and SmackDown brands. This marked the second consecutive year the venue hosted the event and the 15th event under the Saudi Arabian partnership. The official theme song for the event was "2 The Moon" by Pitbull, Ne-Yo, and Afrojack with DJ Buddha.

=== Broadcast outlets ===
The PLE was broadcast on traditional PPV outlets worldwide. It was also available to livestream on ESPN Unlimited in the United States, SuperSport in Sub-Saharan Africa, Abema in Japan, and Netflix everywhere else. This marked the first Night of Champions to livestream on ESPN's app in the United States, as WWE's contract with Peacock to air main roster PLEs expired at the conclusion of Clash in Paris in August 2025. With the event being held in Saudi Arabia, it aired live at 8:00 p.m. Arabia Standard Time (1:00 p.m. Eastern Time).

=== Storylines ===
The event included matches that resulted from scripted storylines. Results were predetermined by WWE's writers on the Raw and SmackDown brands, while storylines were produced on WWE's weekly television shows, Monday Night Raw and Friday Night SmackDown.

During the May 25 episode of Raw, the 25th King of the Ring and fourth Queen of the Ring tournaments were announced to begin on the June 1 episode, subsequently held across episodes of Raw and SmackDown. It was later confirmed that like the 2025 finals, the 2026 finals would take place at Night of Champions with the winner of each tournament receiving a match for a world championship at SummerSlam. During the Clash in Italy post-show on May 31, the brackets for both tournaments were revealed, with first round matches consisting of fatal four-way matches with the winners advancing to the semi-finals, and then the winners of the semi-finals advancing to the finals at Night of Champions. Despite holding Raw's Women's World Championship, Liv Morgan was entered into the Queen of the Ring tournament with her explaining that she wanted to win SmackDown's WWE Women's Championship to become a double world champion. This subsequently confirmed that the winner would have a choice of which title to challenge for, unlike the prior two years in which the winner faced the world champion of their brand. The semifinals of both tournaments took place on the June 15 and 19 episodes of Raw and SmackDown, respectively. Oba Femi, Jey Uso, Iyo Sky, and Morgan, all from Raw, advanced to the finals of the King and Queen of the Ring tournaments.

In April 2025, Seth Rollins, Bron Breakker, and Paul Heyman formed an alliance, with Bronson Reed joining them in May to form the The Vision. However, months later on the October 13 episode of Raw, Breakker and Reed turned on Rollins, attacking him and expelling him from the group. They later added Logan Paul and Austin Theory to the group. In early 2026, The Vision were repeatedly attacked by masked individuals, later revealed to have been orchestrated by Rollins, who was previously out due to injury. On Night 1 of WrestleMania 42, Rollins lost his match against Gunther after Breakker returned from injury and struck Rollins with a spear. At Backlash on May 9, Breakker defeated Rollins. On the May 11 episode of Raw, Rollins helped Joe Hendry and The Street Profits (Angelo Dawkins and Montez Ford) defeat The Vision (Breakker, Paul, and Theory). As Rollins helped Dawkins get up after the match, Breakker attempted to spear Rollins, but Rollins moved, causing Dawkins to get hit. Later that night, Rollins attempted to form an alliance with The Street Profits, but Ford was furious at him. The following week, Rollins defeated Theory. After the match, Dawkins came out to help Rollins fend off Paul and Theory, and then Ford followed to help his partner. Ford asked why Dawkins came to the ring and then shoved him away to take a spear from Breakker. This allowed The Vision to continue their attack on Rollins. A week later, Rollins and Ford argued over a potential alliance, leading to a match later that night with Rollins defeating Ford. After the match, Theory appeared on stage with Dawkins proceeding to slam his head with a steel chair. Later that night, Ford told Rollins that Dawkins needed them. On the June 1 episode, Rollins defeated Breakker with the help of Ford, who took out Theory. A week later, Rollins was in a first round match of the King of the Ring tournament. When Theory prevented Rollins from getting the pinfall, Ford came out to brawl with Theory. Breakker then speared Rollins, causing Rollins to get eliminated from the tournament. On the June 15 episode, Rollins challenged Breakker to a steel cage match at Night of Champions, which Breakker accepted and it was subsequently made official.

On the May 22 episode of SmackDown, WWE United States Champion Trick Williams faced Carmelo Hayes. Ricky Saints, who lost to Hayes the previous week, got himself involved in the match to distract Hayes, causing Hayes to lose to Williams. Later that night, Hayes attacked Saints backstage and told him to stay out of his business. A week later, Hayes stated that he would take care of Saints so he and Williams could have a fair match, but Williams claimed Hayes was making excuses. Saints came out to state his intention to take out Hayes and win the United States Championship. Hayes and Saints subsequently had a rematch that ended in a double countout. Another rematch between Saints and Hayes took place a week later, with Saints emerging victorious over Hayes. On the June 19 episode, Saints and Hayes faced off once again, but for the right to challenge for the United States Championship. Saints came out victorious and a title match against Williams was made official for Night of Champions.

After Gunther defeated Seth Rollins at WrestleMania 42, Paul Heyman owed Gunther a favor: a match for SmackDown's Undisputed WWE Championship. At Clash in Italy on May 31, Gunther controversially lost to champion Cody Rhodes; the referee did not see his foot under the bottom rope during the pinfall attempt that ended the match. On the June 5 episode of SmackDown, Rhodes told Gunther that they could have a rematch later that night. Sami Zayn came out to claim that both Rhodes and Gunther did him wrong. Zayn reminded Rhodes that he promised to teach Zayn a lesson after defeating Gunther. Then, Rhodes and Zayn both attacked Gunther. As Gunther and Zayn ended up sprawled on the floor, Rhodes went for a suicide dive to Gunther, but Gunther moved and Rhodes accidentally hit Zayn instead. Rhodes offered to help Zayn, but Zayn declined his offer. Later that night, SmackDown General Manager Nick Aldis stated that Gunther's lawyers had one condition for Gunther and Rhodes's rematch: Zayn as the special guest referee. On the June 19 episode, Rhodes controversially retained the title against Gunther again after a fast three count by Zayn. Rhodes, Gunther, Zayn, and Aldis argued at Gorilla Position before Rhodes went back in the ring to demand their match to be restarted. Aldis agreed to the restart despite complaints from Zayn. The restarted match eventually ended in a no contest after Zayn attacked Gunther and Rhodes. After the match, Gunther demanded Aldis to give him another rematch. Later that night, Rhodes told Aldis that he wanted to beat both Gunther and Zayn, requesting a triple threat match. Aldis made it official for Night of Champions.

At Saturday Night's Main Event XLI on November 1, 2025, Jade Cargill defeated Tiffany Stratton to win the WWE Women's Championship. On the April 24 episode of SmackDown, Stratton defeated Giulia to win the WWE Women's United States Championship, while Cargill lost the WWE Women's Championship to Rhea Ripley at WrestleMania 42. On the June 5 episode of SmackDown, Stratton teamed with Charlotte Flair to fight Cargill and Michin (accompanied by B-Fab). The match concluded when Cargill pinned Stratton after hitting her with Jaded. A week later, Flair and Cargill competed in the first round of the Queen of the Ring tournament. B-Fab and Michin attacked Flair, and then Alexa Bliss and Stratton came out to neutralize B-Fab and Michin, helping Flair to win the match. After the match, Stratton clarified that she and Flair were not friends, explaining that her assistance to Flair stemmed solely from their shared goal of preventing Cargill from becoming champion. Later that night, B-Fab and Michin defeated Stratton and Chelsea Green. After the match, Stratton blindsided B-Fab and Michin, and then she brawled with Cargill until she was overwhelmed by a simultaneous attack by Cargill, B-Fab, and Michin. After the assault, Cargill picked up the Women's United States Championship belt. A week later, Stratton agreed to defend the title against Cargill at Night of Champions.

== Event ==
Other on-screen personnel
| Role: | Name: |
|---|---|
| English commentators | Michael Cole |
| English commentators | Corey Graves |
| Arabic commentators | Faisal Al-Mughaisib |
| Arabic commentators | Jude Al-Dajani |
| Ring announcer | Mark Nash |
| Referees | Charles Robinson |
| Referees | Daphanie LaShaunn |
| Referees | Darryl Sharma |
| Referees | Dan Engler |
| Interviewers | Byron Saxton |
| Pre-show panel | Joe Tessitore |
| Pre-show panel | Big E |
| Pre-show panel | Peter Rosenberg |

=== Preliminary matches ===
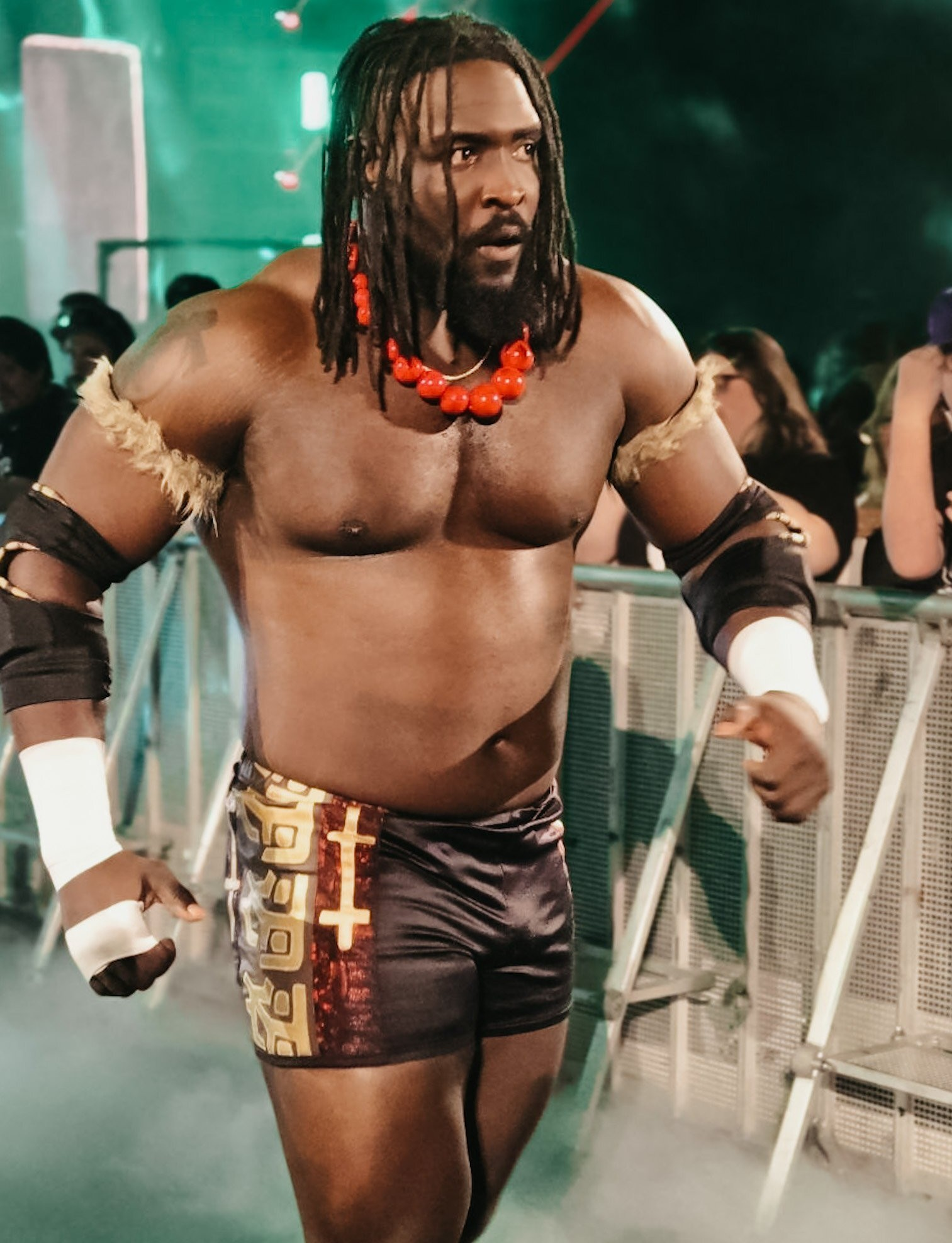
Oba Femi won the 2026 King of the Ring.

The PLE opened with Jey Uso versus Oba Femi in the final of the King of the Ring tournament. Femi blocked an initial strike from Uso and threw him into the turnbuckle. After Uso retreated to the outside, he shoved Femi into the ring post. He then performed three suicide dives; on his third attempt, Femi caught him with a strike. Uso countered a powerbomb attempt and hit the back of Femi's head with a superkick. He then followed with an Uso Splash, but Femi kicked out at one. Uso hit three consecutive superkicks and a spear. Uso then landed an Uso Splash but was unable to pin Femi; a third Uso Splash yielded only a two-count. Uso applied a sleeper hold, but Femi escaped before hitting two running uppercuts and throwing him across the ring. Femi then executed the Fall From Grace to get the pinfall victory and become the 2026 King of the Ring.

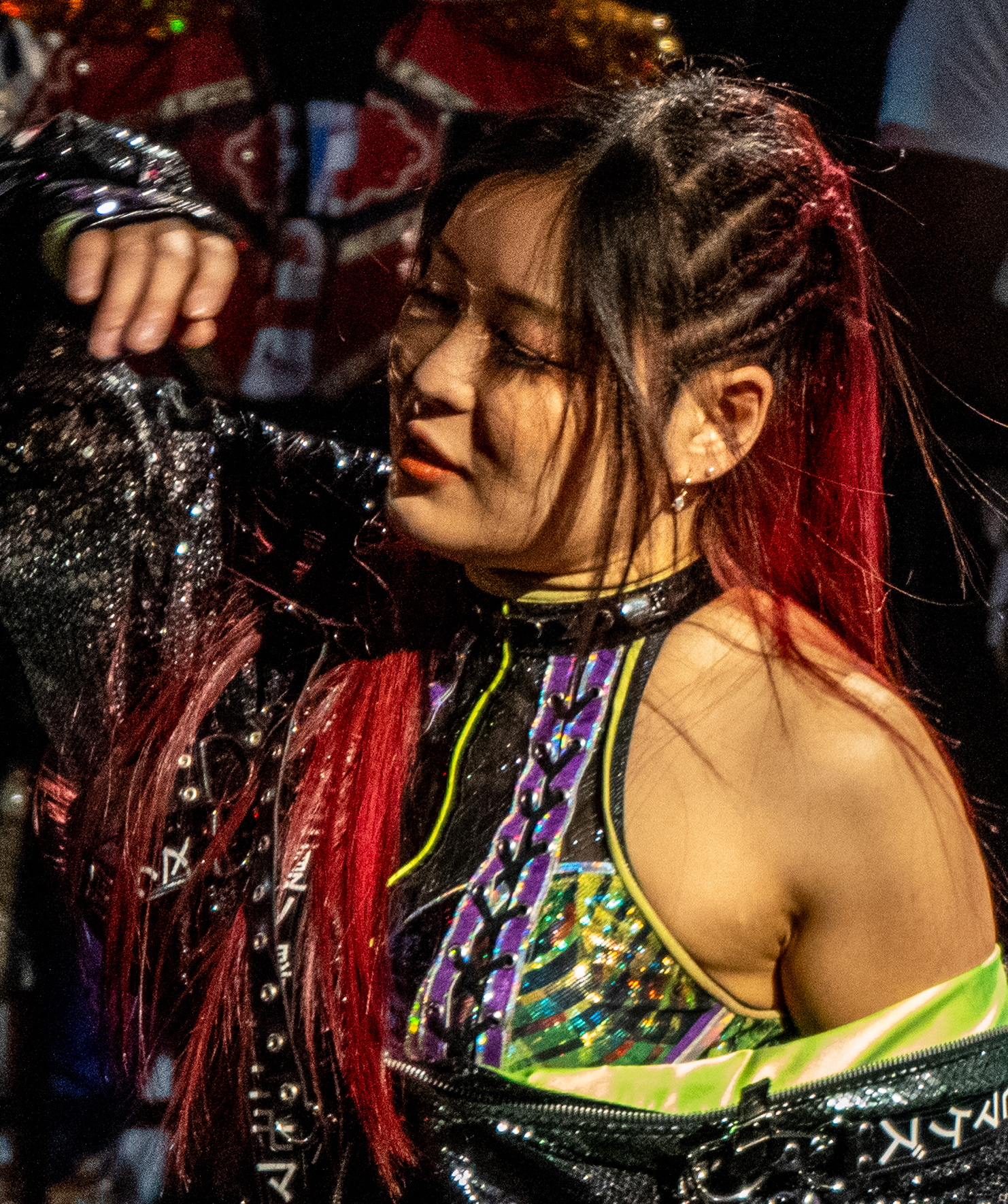
Iyo Sky won the 2026 Queen of the Ring.

The Queen of the Ring tournament final between Iyo Sky and Women's World Champion Liv Morgan followed. Before the match, Morgan interrupted Danhausen's promo and demanded the Judgment Day's money back, which prompted Danhausen to put a curse on her. Early into the match, Morgan hit the Three Amigos and applied a Boston Crab. After escaping, Sky hit a missile dropkick and a running meteora, and then Morgan responded with a backstabber. Morgan knocked Sky off the top rope, causing Sky to injure her knee upon landing on the steel steps. Morgan then applied a single-leg crab. Although Sky rolled out of the hold, her knee buckled, which allowed Morgan hit a springboard tornado Codebreaker for a near-fall. Sky evaded Morgan's Oblivion before executing the Over the Moonsault to win the match and the Queen of the Ring tournament. After the match, Sky chose to challenge Morgan for the Women's World Championship at SummerSlam.

Next, Seth Rollins and Bron Breakker battled inside a steel cage. Before entering the cage, Rollins put various foreign objects inside the cage. Breakker dominated early while utilizing the cage and various weapons. Rollins attacked Breakker's ribs with a kendo stick. Breakker attempted to spear him through a table in the corner, but Rollins countered. After covering him with steel chairs, Rollins ascended the ropes with another chair, but Breakker sent Rollins onto the pile of chairs with a Frankensteiner instead. Breakker then used a chair to hit a Doomsday Device and a spear for a two-count. Breakker climbed the cage to attempt an escape. Rollins recovered and caught Breakker before executing a superplex from the top of the cage through a table; Breakker began to bleed from his left eye. Breakker landed a spear for a near-fall before attempting to escape through the door; Rollins pulled him back. Breakker attempted a spear, but Rollins dodged, causing Breakker to crash through the table in the corner. Rollins then hit the Pedigree and the Stomp, but Breakker kicked out at two. Then, Rollins hit the Stomp off the second rope to defeat Breakker.

Next, Trick Williams (accompanied by Lil Yachty) defended the WWE United States Championship against Ricky Saints. Williams trapped Saints in the corner, forcing Saints to retreat to the outside. Saints took the kendo stick Yachty was carrying and then faked an attack by Yachty, which convinced the referee to eject Yachty. Saints then ambushed Williams as he and Yachty argued against the call. He targeted Williams' back until Williams came back with a Bookend. His momentum was halted when Saints hit a diving clothesline and a neckbreaker for a two-count. After a counter by Williams, Saints retaliated with the Revolution DDT and a diving elbow drop for a near-fall. Saints attempted the Revolution DDT again, but Williams evaded and hit the Trick Shot to retain his title.

In the penultimate match, Tiffany Stratton defended the WWE Women's United States Championship against Jade Cargill. Stratton attacked immediately after the opening bell. When Cargill retreated to the outside, she countered Stratton's suicide dive attempt and then slammed her onto the ring apron. Cargill attempted Jaded, but Stratton countered it. Cargill's stablemates B-Fab and Michin eventually appeared, but Chelsea Green emerged from underneath the ring to attack them. Cargill dragged Green into the ring which caused a distraction that allowed Charlotte Flair to strike Cargill with the championship belt. Stratton capitalized with the Prettiest Moonsault Ever to retain the title.

=== Main event ===
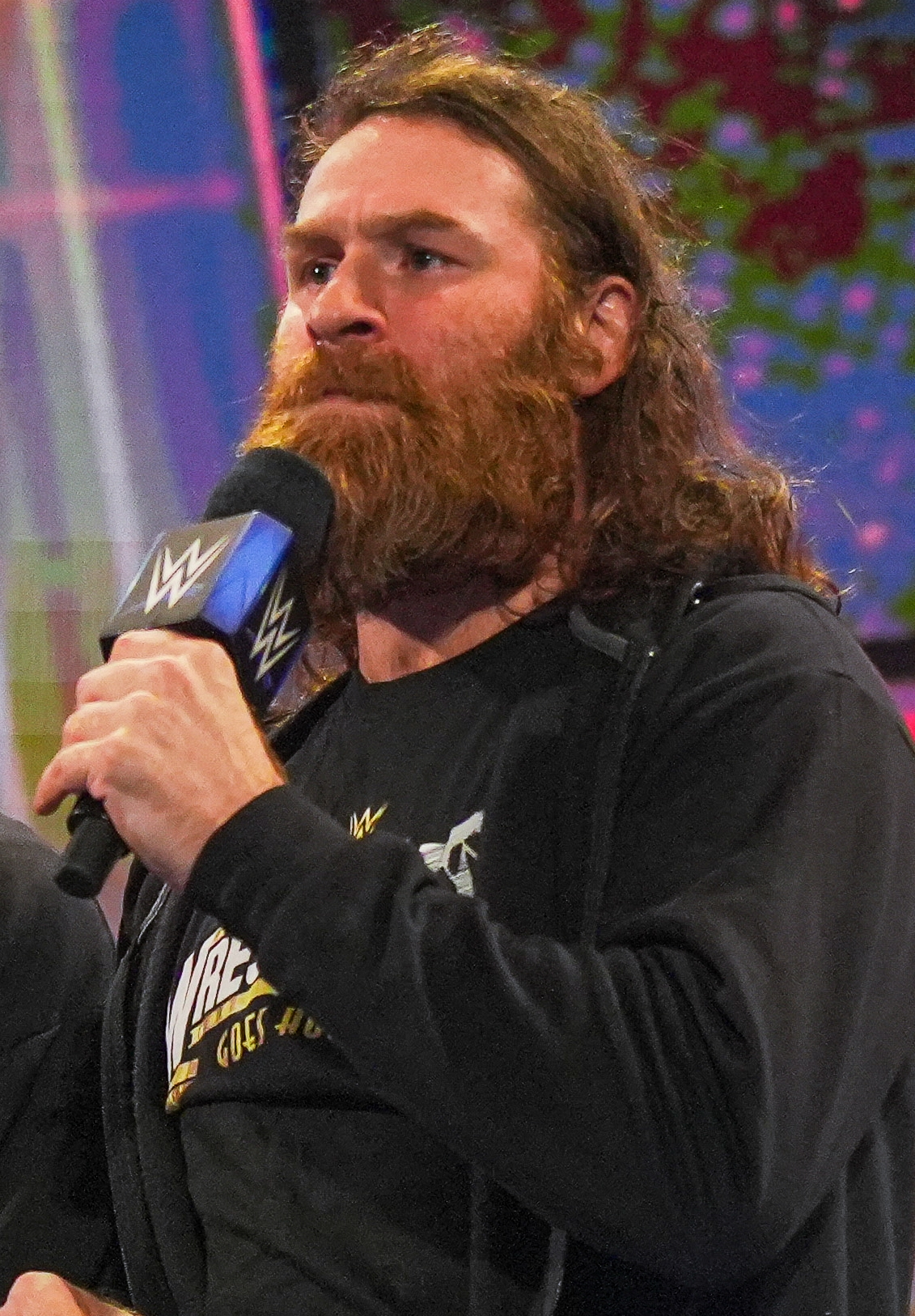
Sami Zayn won the Undisputed WWE Championship, becoming a Triple Crown and Grand Slam champion in the process.

In the main event, Cody Rhodes defended the Undisputed WWE Championship in a triple threat match against Sami Zayn and Gunther. Zayn dumped Gunther to the outside to face Rhodes. Gunther then pulled Zayn to the outside and whipped him into the steel steps; he then targeted Rhodes. Zayn attempted to ambush Gunther, but Gunther sent him to the outside instead. Rhodes retaliated with an attack on both of his opponents. After Zayn sent Gunther into the steel steps, he executed the Blue Thunder Bomb on Rhodes for a near-fall. Rhodes then hit Gunther with Cross Rhodes, but Zayn pulled the referee to the outside on the ensuing pinfall attempt. Gunther powerbombed Rhodes onto Zayn, and then Zayn turned another powerbomb into a sunset flip. Zayn evaded Gunther's big boot and then connected with the Helluva Kick, though Rhodes pulled the referee to the outside to break the pinfall. Zayn attempted to put Rhodes through an announce table with a package piledriver, but Rhodes countered it, sending Zayn through another announce table. Gunther then powerbombed Rhodes twice onto the remaining announce table. Gunther locked Rhodes in a sleeper hold. As Rhodes began to lose consciousness, a recovered Zayn caught Rhodes' arm to keep the match alive. Gunther targeted Zayn, but Zayn countered with an exploder suplex to the corner and a Helluva Kick for a near-fall. Gunther responded with a clothesline, and Rhodes hit Gunther with a Cody Cutter. Rhodes attempted the Cross Rhodes on Zayn, but Zayn countered it into a roll-up to win the Undisputed WWE Championship for the first time in his career. With the win, Zayn became the first Muslim to hold the world championship since The Iron Sheik last held it in 1983 as well as the first Arab and Syrian to win the title in WWE.

== Reception ==
Scott Slimmer of 411Mania called the event a "good show" with Oba Femi and Sami Zayn's wins as the major highlights. Graham GSM Matthews of the Bleacher Report stated that the main event saved the show from becoming a skippable one. He criticized the inconsistency of the energy from the crowd in Saudi Arabia. He then described the event as "perfectly fine in a vacuum" where all the correct decisions were made. On the other hand, Thomas Hall of 411Mania stated that Zayn's win saved an otherwise uninteresting event. He felt bored as the "fine" matches were lacking and claimed that the event was "not one of their better efforts". Jordan Mendoza of USA Today said that some matches "felt underwhelming" on a "far from [...] perfect day of wrestling". Although, the "great" matches saved the event and set up an "intriguing" build for SummerSlam.

Regarding the King of the Ring finals Thomas Hall of 411Mania expected outside interferences and called the match a success. Anthony Sulla-Heffinger of Uncrowned believed that he was not alone in being surprised about Femi's win and the lack of outside interferences; he expected The Bloodline or Brock Lesnar to prevent Femi from winning the tournament. He further stated that he has no complaints about Femi's continued ascension. He said that the match was "perfectly fine" and that the only notable talking point was the outcome. Mendoza said, "You have to be grateful there was no interference". He stated that he did not see Jey Uso defeating Femi cleanly and claimed Femi had another display of dominance. Matthews described Femi as "not just a domestic sensation" who gets "mega star reactions" worldwide. He was also surprised that Lesnar, who had a rivalry with Femi, did not interfere. He speculated that Femi would wrestle twice at SummerSlam with a match against Lesnar on one night and a world championship match on the other night. Scott Slimmer of 411Mania called Femi's win as the "launching pad for at least a decade of dominance".

As for the Queen of the Ring finals, Mendoza stated that despite the Danhausen curse spoiling the result, it was a "good appetizer" for their match at SummerSlam. Sulla-Heffinger said their match was "solid". Although the match had many highlights, he felt that they were not enough; he speculated more at SummerSlam. Matthews and Hall were more negative. Matthews said that Danhausen cursing Liv Morgan spoiled her loss "for anyone over the age of 10". Hall criticized the logic behind Iyo Sky doing high-flying moves with an injured knee. He also stated his dislike for a champion losing clean to set up a championship match.

For the steel cage match, Matthews said that Breakker losing was not ideal and that Breakker "[looked] like a star", especially with Breakker's unintentional bleeding. Sullla-Heffinger said that it was an "incredible closing chapter" to their feud. He believed that Breakker looked strong without winning the match. Mendoza called their match the best in their trilogy. He recognized the superplex off the top of the cage as the best highlight of the night and stated that the weapons elevated the stakes of the steel cage match. Meanwhile, Hall stated that he is tired of weapons in cage matches. He called the outcome pointless with neither Breakker nor Rollins benefitting from the match.

Reviewing the United States Championship match, Matthews stated that Saints had an impressive performance as a newcomer on the main roster. Hall and Sulla-Heffinger thought that Saints never truly jeopardized Williams' reign. Hall stated that it was the right decision to have Williams retain. Mendoza called the match a "real snoozer" with neither careers of the "rising stars" improving from the match.

Hall called the United States Women's Championship match "perfectly fine but mostly unremarkable". Matthews believed that the match was not worthy of a spot at a Premium Live Event (PLE) and found Cargill's third consecutive loss at a PLE surprising. Mendoza felt that Tiffany Stratton and Jade Cargill were "going through the motions" since the beginning and that there was nothing exciting until outside interferences occurred. Sulla-Heffinger was more optimistic, calling the match "decent".

As for the main event, Hall said that it was the best of the night, with Zayn's title win described as "hard to actually believe" and "the big moment that the show was dying for". Mendoza remarked that Sami Zayn's "shocking" victory perfectly capped off a "strong main event" where everyone had a "chance to shine and perform at their best", noting that the crowd energy was the best of the night, largely driven by Saudi Arabians' love for Zayn. Sulla-Heffinger called the match an "absolute classic" and Zayn's title win an "epic WWE moment" that joins the ranks of WWE Championship wins by Mankind, Daniel Bryan, Kofi Kingston, and Rhodes. Matthews asserted that a loss for Zayn would have constituted "booking malpractice", especially in Saudi Arabia. Slimmer stated that Zayn's win culminated "a 24-year journey" that fans doubted would happen.

== Aftermath ==
In the event's post-show, Gunther confronted SmackDown General Manager Nick Aldis, demanding to know if Aldis was pleased with Gunther's loss. Gunther then accused Aldis of jealousy, labeling him a "failed wrestler". The exchange escalated into a physical altercation before they were separated. This led to Aldis being put on (kayfabe) administrative leave by WWE Headquarters, with Adam Pearce named as temporary SmackDown General Manager that week.

=== Raw ===
Oba Femi opened the following episode of Raw to celebrate his King of the Ring tournament win. He was interrupted by a returning Brock Lesnar, who laid out Femi with an F-5. Afterwards, Femi decided to give up his title shot to challenge Lesnar to a match at SummerSlam. Lesnar accepted on the condition that the match be made a Hell in a Cell match.

=== SmackDown ===
New Undisputed WWE Champion Sami Zayn opened the following episode of SmackDown to talk about his title win. He was interrupted by Cody Rhodes, who congratulated Zayn on the win. As Rhodes left, Jey Uso interrupted, also congratulating Zayn, and wanting a shot at the title. General Manager Adam Pearce scheduled Zayn to defend the title against the winner of Rhodes vs. Uso on the July 6 episode of Raw. The match was won by Rhodes. On Raw, however, Rhodes was attacked by Gunther, and it was revealed that Rhodes was not medically cleared to compete. CM Punk was announced as the replacement and subsequently defeated Zayn to win the Undisputed WWE Championship.

Also on SmackDown, Jade Cargill's team defeated United States Champion Tiffany Stratton's team in a six-woman tag team match.

== Results ==
| No. | Results | Stipulations | Times |
|---|---|---|---|
| 1 | Oba Femi defeated Jey Uso by pinfall | King of the Ring tournament final The winner was crowned "King of the Ring" and earned a world championship match at SummerSlam. (Note: Femi later relinquished his title match in order to face Brock Lesnar at SummerSlam.) | 7:56 |
| 2 | Iyo Sky defeated Liv Morgan by pinfall | Queen of the Ring tournament final The winner was crowned "Queen of the Ring" and earned a world championship match at SummerSlam. | 14:56 |
| 3 | Seth Rollins defeated Bron Breakker by pinfall | Steel Cage match | 19:04 |
| 4 | Trick Williams (c) (with Lil Yachty) defeated Ricky Saints by pinfall | Singles match for the WWE United States Championship | 10:43 |
| 5 | Tiffany Stratton (c) defeated Jade Cargill by pinfall | Singles match for the WWE Women's United States Championship | 7:40 |
| 6 | Sami Zayn defeated Cody Rhodes (c) and Gunther by pinfall | Triple threat match for the Undisputed WWE Championship | 18:38 |
(c) / – the champion(s) heading into the match

=== Tournament brackets ===
| † | Raw | ‡ | SmackDown |

=== King of the Ring ===
First Round; Raw; June 1–8, 2026; SmackDown; June 5–12, 2026
Penta | —
Oba Femi | Pinfall
Solo Sikoa | 9:00
Carmelo Hayes | —
Dominik Mysterio | Pinfall
Bron Breakker | —
Trick Williams | —
Damian Priest | 17:00
Seth Rollins | —
Je'Von Evans | Pinfall
Talla Tonga | —
Ricky Saints | 15:15
Jey Uso | Pinfall
LA Knight | 18:40
Royce Keys | —
Finn Bálor | —

Semifinals; Raw; June 15, 2026; SmackDown; June 19, 2026
Oba Femi | Pinfall
Dominik Mysterio | 4:35
Je'Von Evans | 17:55
Jey Uso | Pinfall

Final; Night of Champions; June 27, 2026
Oba Femi | Pinfall
Jey Uso | 8:00

=== Queen of the Ring ===
First Round; Raw; June 1–8, 2026; SmackDown; June 5–12, 2026
Liv Morgan | Pinfall
Becky Lynch | —
Alexa Bliss | —
Chelsea Green | 9:15
Sol Ruca | —
Lyra Valkyria | 18:35
Charlotte Flair | Submission
Jade Cargill | —
Roxanne Perez | —
Iyo Sky | Pinfall
Giulia | 10:40
Lash Legend | —
Bayley | —
Raquel Rodriguez | Pinfall
Jacy Jayne | —
Kiana James | 14:05

Semifinals; Raw; June 15, 2026; SmackDown; June 19, 2026
Liv Morgan | Submission
Charlotte Flair | 18:25
Iyo Sky | Pinfall
Raquel Rodriguez | 10:15

Final; Night of Champions; June 27, 2026
Liv Morgan | 14:55
Iyo Sky | Pinfall
