= Super Show-Down (2018) =

WWE pay-per-view and livestreaming event

- Promotional poster featuring The Shield (Seth Rollins, Roman Reigns and Dean Ambrose), The Undertaker, and Triple H
- Promotion: WWE
- Brand(s): Raw; SmackDown; 205 Live
- Date: October 6, 2018
- City: Melbourne, Victoria, Australia
- Venue: Melbourne Cricket Ground
- Attendance: 62,000
- Buy rate: 65,000 (excluding WWE Network views)

WWE event chronology
← Previous; Hell in a Cell	Next → Evolution

Super ShowDown chronology
← Previous; First	Next → 2019

WWE in Australia chronology
← Previous; First	Next → Elimination Chamber

The 2018 Super Show-Down was a professional wrestling pay-per-view (PPV) and livestreaming event produced by the American company WWE, held for wrestlers from the promotion's main roster brands, Raw, SmackDown, and 205 Live. It was the inaugural Super Show-Down and took place on Saturday, October 6, 2018, at the Melbourne Cricket Ground in Melbourne, Victoria, Australia. The event aired live at 7:00 p.m. Australian Eastern Time (5:00 a.m. Eastern Time) and was WWE's only PPV and livestreaming event held in Australia until Elimination Chamber in 2024.

Ten matches were contested at the event. In the main event, Triple H defeated The Undertaker in a No Disqualification match that was billed as the "Last Time Ever". In the penultimate match, Daniel Bryan defeated The Miz to earn a match for SmackDown's WWE Championship. In other prominent matches, The Shield (Roman Reigns, Seth Rollins, and Dean Ambrose) defeated Braun Strowman, Dolph Ziggler, and Drew McIntyre, AJ Styles defeated Samoa Joe by submission in a no countout, no disqualification match to retain the WWE Championship, and Buddy Murphy defeated Cedric Alexander to win 205 Live's WWE Cruiserweight Championship.

The event was met with mixed to positive reception from critics. Although the six-man tag team match, Cruiserweight Championship, SmackDown Tag Team Championship, and WWE Championship matches were highly praised, the Daniel Bryan vs. The Miz match and the main event were subject to criticism. The event returned the following year in Saudi Arabia with the name restylized as "Super ShowDown" (no hyphen), but it was discontinued after the 2020 event, which was also in Saudi Arabia.

== Production ==
=== Background ===
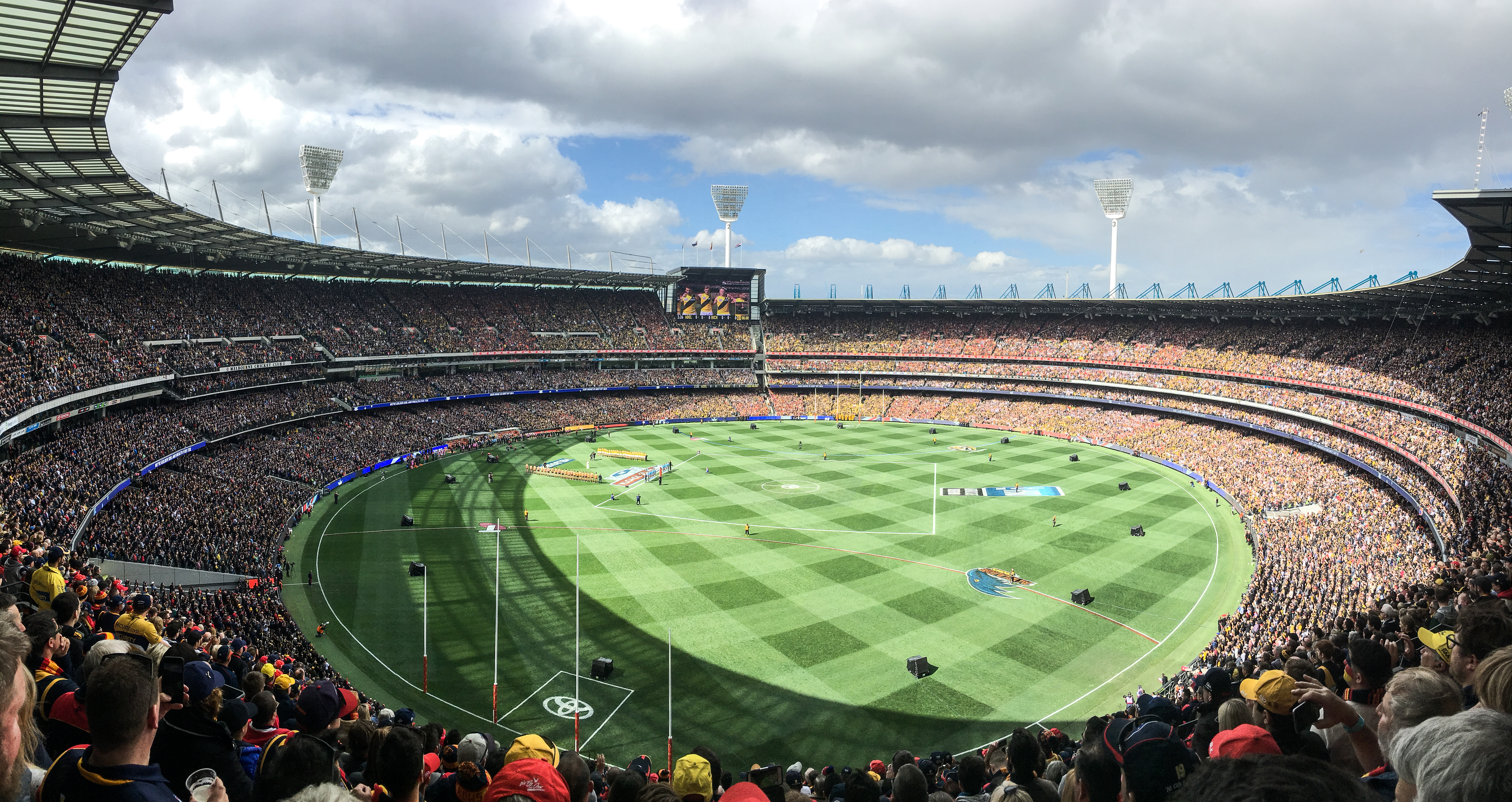
The inaugural Super Show-Down was held at the Melbourne Cricket Ground in Melbourne, Victoria, Australia, marking WWE's first pay-per-view and livestreaming event held in Australia.

On June 16, 2018, the American professional wrestling promotion WWE announced that the company would be returning to Australia to hold its first-ever pay-per-view (PPV) and livestreaming event in the country, featuring wrestlers from the Raw, SmackDown, and 205 Live brand divisions. The event was titled Super Show-Down and was scheduled to be held on Saturday, October 6, 2018, at the Melbourne Cricket Ground in Melbourne, Victoria, Australia. Although WWE held tours in Australia over the years, the company's last big event to be held in the country was the Global Warning Tour in 2002. In addition to airing live at 7:00 p.m. Australian Eastern Time (5:00 a.m. Eastern Time) on traditional PPV worldwide, the event was available to livestream on the WWE Network.

=== Storylines ===
The event comprised 10 matches that resulted from scripted storylines. Results were predetermined by WWE's writers on the Raw, SmackDown, and 205 Live brands, while storylines were produced on WWE's weekly television shows, Monday Night Raw, SmackDown Live, and the cruiserweight-exclusive 205 Live.

On June 16, 2018, a match between The Undertaker and Triple H was scheduled for Super Show-Down. On the August 20 episode of Raw, Triple H spoke about how he reluctantly accepted the rematch as the last match between the two at WrestleMania XXVIII (a Hell in a Cell match with Shawn Michaels as guest referee) was billed as the "End of an Era". Triple H added that the tagline of this contest would be "Last Time Ever". On the September 17 episode, it was revealed that Kane would be in Undertaker's corner, and Michaels would be in Triple H's corner.

At SummerSlam, The Miz defeated Daniel Bryan after hitting him with a pair of brass knuckles that his wife Maryse had given him. On the following SmackDown, Miz and Maryse mocked Bryan's retirement speech from two years earlier. Bryan and his wife Brie Bella came out and confronted them. Bryan called Miz a coward for having to cheat to win and revealed that SmackDown General Manager Paige approved of a mixed tag team match pitting Bryan and Brie against Miz and Maryse at Hell in a Cell, which Miz and Maryse won. On August 21, a rematch between Bryan and The Miz was also scheduled for Super Show-Down, where the winner would receive a WWE Championship opportunity.

Also on August 21, The Shield (Dean Ambrose, Roman Reigns, and Seth Rollins) were scheduled for a six-man tag team match at the event. The Shield reunited to prevent Braun Strowman from cashing in his Money in the Bank contract for the Universal Championship on Reigns on the August 20 episode of Raw, after Reigns retained the title against Finn Bálor. This led to a match on the August 27 episode of Raw, in which Reigns and Strowman teamed up to face against Dolph Ziggler and Drew McIntyre. During the match, Strowman turned on Reigns and helped Ziggler and McIntyre attack him, turning heel for the second time in his career. Following the assault on Reigns, the trio also attacked Ambrose and Rollins when they tried to aid Reigns. The Shield were then scheduled to face Strowman, McIntyre, and Ziggler at Super Show-Down.

At SummerSlam, during the WWE Championship match between Samoa Joe and AJ Styles, Joe taunted Styles by disrespecting his wife and daughter, who were in attendance. An irate Styles attacked Joe with a steel chair, resulting in Joe winning by disqualification, however, Styles retained the title. On August 24, a rematch between the two for the title was scheduled for Hell in a Cell. Prior to Hell in a Cell, another title match was scheduled for Super Show-Down. At Hell in a Cell, Styles countered Joe's "Coquina Clutch" into a pin to retain the championship, despite Styles submitting to the "Coquina Clutch", which the referee did not see. After the match, Joe attacked Styles. Later backstage, Paige told Joe that the title match at Super Show-Down would feature "no disqualifications, no countouts, and no excuses".

On the August 7 episode of SmackDown, The New Day's Big E and Kofi Kingston defeated The Bar (Cesaro and Sheamus) to become the number one contenders for the SmackDown Tag Team Championship at SummerSlam, where The New Day defeated defending champions The Bludgeon Brothers' (Harper and Rowan) by disqualification, but did not win the titles. The New Day captured the championships on the following episode of SmackDown and retained them at Hell in a Cell. On September 4, a match between The New Day and The Bar for the titles was scheduled for Super Show-Down.

At SummerSlam, Charlotte Flair defeated Becky Lynch and defending champion Carmella in a triple threat match to capture the SmackDown Women's Championship. After the match, Lynch attacked Flair, thus turning heel. Throughout following weeks, the two attacked each other. At Hell in a Cell, Lynch defeated Flair to win the championship. On September 6, a title rematch was scheduled for Super Show-Down.

Following the return of Trish Stratus on the August 27 episode of Raw, Stratus, along with Raw Women's Champion Ronda Rousey, would accompany Natalya in her match against Alicia Fox, which she won. After the contest, the duo were congratulated by The Bella Twins (Nikki Bella and Brie Bella), who announced that they would be returning to action against The Riott Squad (Ruby Riott, Liv Morgan, and Sarah Logan) the following week. Shortly afterwards, a six-woman tag team match pitting Rousey and The Bella Twins against The Riott Squad was scheduled for Super Show-Down.

On the August 21 episode of SmackDown, Peyton Royce defeated Naomi. The following week, Billie Kay defeated Naomi. On the September 4 episode of SmackDown, Naomi defeated Royce. After the match, The IIconics (Royce and Kay) attacked Naomi until the returning Asuka made the save. On September 4, a tag team match pitting The IIconics against Asuka and Naomi was scheduled for Super Show-Down.

On August 10, a match between John Cena and Kevin Owens was scheduled for Super Show-Down. However, on August 21, the match was changed to a tag team match with Cena and Bobby Lashley facing Owens and Elias.

On August 29, a match between for the Cruiserweight Championship was scheduled for Super Show-Down where defending champion Cedric Alexander would defend the title against Buddy Murphy.

== Event ==
Other on-screen personnel
Role:	Name:
English commentators	Michael Cole
English commentators	Corey Graves
English commentators	Renee Young
Ring announcer	JoJo
Referees	Jason Ayers
Referees	Mike Chioda
Referees	Darrick Moore
Referees	Charles Robinson
Referees	Rod Zapata

=== Preliminary matches ===
The actual pay-per-view opened with The New Day (Kofi Kingston and Xavier Woods) (with Big E) defending the SmackDown Tag Team Championship against Cesaro and Sheamus. In the end, Kingston and Woods performed a backstabber and diving double foot stomp combination on Cesaro to retain the titles.

Next, Becky Lynch defended the SmackDown Women's Championship against Charlotte Flair. In the end, Lynch attempted to walk away from the match with the SmackDown Women's title belt. However, Flair brought her back in the ring and performed a spear on Lynch. Flair applied the Figure Eight Leglock on Lynch, only for Lynch to grab the title belt, which was laying in the ring, and attack Flair with it, thus Flair won by disqualification, but Lynch retained. After the match, Lynch continued to attack Flair.

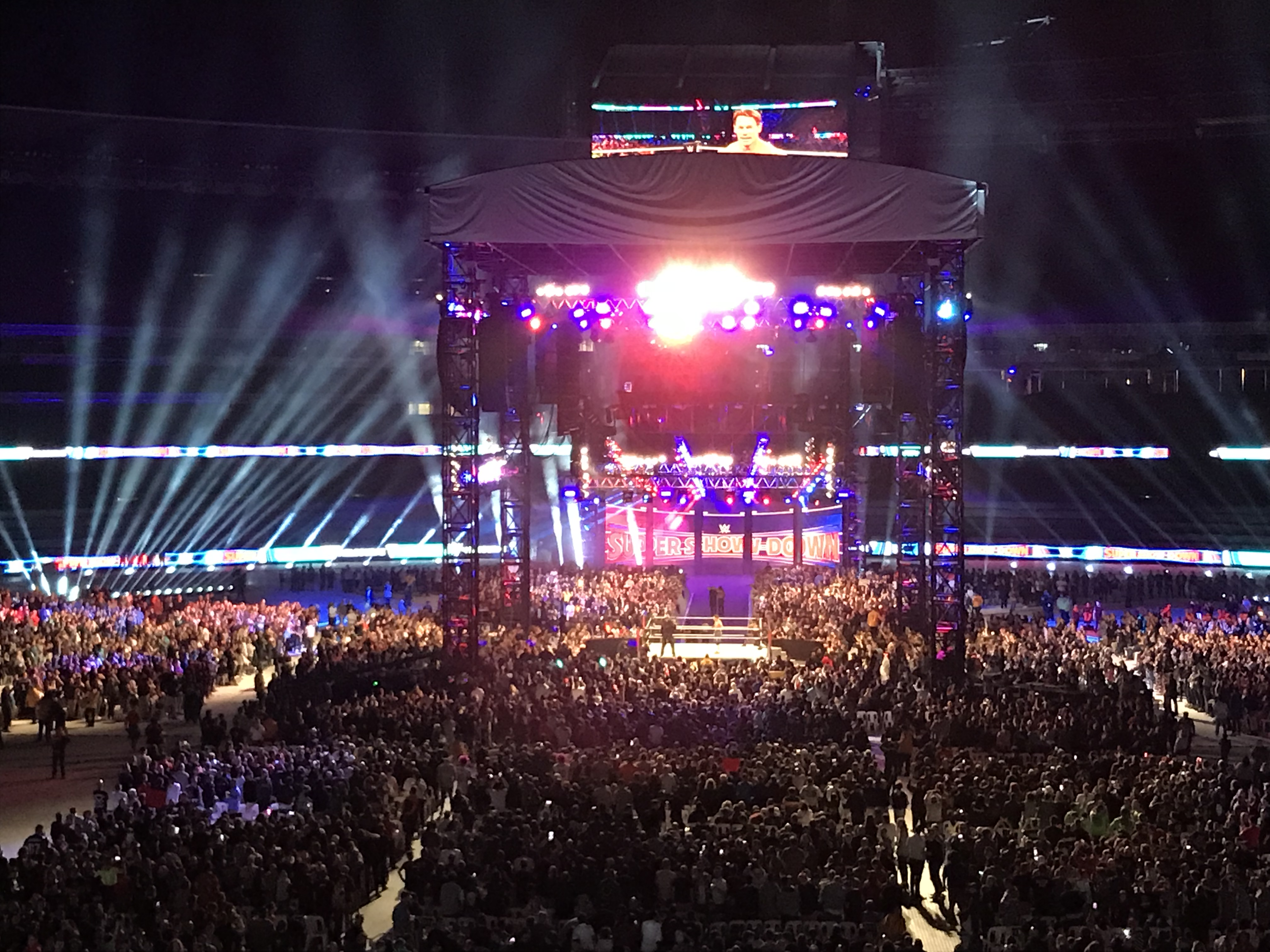
WWE Super Show-Down 2018 John Cena promo.

After that, John Cena and Bobby Lashley faced Kevin Owens and Elias. Throughout the match, Elias and Owens dominated Lashley. In the climax, Cena tagged in, performed a Five Knuckle Shuffle, Attitude Adjustment, and the Sixth Move of Doom on Elias to win the match. After the match, Cena cut a promo where he thanked the crowd in attendance.

In the fourth match, The IIconics (Peyton Royce and Billie Kay) fought Asuka and Naomi. In the end, Kay sent Asuka into the barricade and back inside, Royce performed a running knee on Naomi to win the match.

Next, AJ Styles defended SmackDown's WWE Championship against Samoa Joe in a no countout, no disqualification match. Before the match began, Styles and Joe fought on the entrance ramp. The match eventually began when both combatants entered the ring. Styles performed a moonsault into a reverse DDT on Joe for a near-fall. Joe performed a clothesline on Styles for another near-fall. Joe attempted to attack Styles with a chair, only for Styles to counter Joe with a dropkick and attacked Joe with the chair. Styles attempted another attack, however, Joe performed a uranage on Styles onto the chair for another near-fall. Joe attempted an inverted DDT through a table on Styles, however, Styles countered and put Joe through the table instead. Joe applied the Coquina Clutch on Styles, however, Styles escaped. Styles performed a 450° splash onto Joe's knee. Styles performed a Phenomenal Forearm on Joe off the barricade. In the closing moments, Styles attempted a second Phenomenal Forearm on Joe, only for Joe to counter into the Coquina Clutch. However, Styles countered into a pinning combination for a nearfall. Styles then applied the Calf Crusher on Joe, who submitted, to retain the title.

In the sixth match, The Riott Squad (Ruby Riott, Liv Morgan, and Sarah Logan) faced Ronda Rousey and The Bella Twins (Nikki Bella and Brie Bella). The Riott Squad dominated the match until Rousey tagged herself in. In the climax, Morgan prevented Rousey from applying an armbar to Logan. As Logan and Morgan picked Rousey up, Rousey sent both of them to the mat and applied a double armbar on them, which caused both to submit to win the match.

After that, Cedric Alexander defended 205 Live's WWE Cruiserweight Championship against Buddy Murphy. Murphy went on the attack early and tried to finish the match quickly. Later, Alexander performed a Michinoku Driver and the Lumbar Check for a near-fall. In the climax, Murphy performed Murphy's Law on Alexander to win the title.

Next, The Shield (Dean Ambrose, Seth Rollins, and Roman Reigns) fought Braun Strowman, Dolph Ziggler, and Drew McIntyre. The Shield tried to put Strowman through the announce table with a triple powerbomb, however, they were intercepted by Ziggler and McIntyre. In the end, as Reigns attempted to perform a superman punch on McIntyre, Reigns ended up accidentally hitting Ambrose. The Shield tried for the triple powerbomb on McIntyre, however, Strowman tackled them. In the climax, Ambrose performed Dirty Deeds on Ziggler to win the match.

In the penultimate match, The Miz fought Daniel Bryan where the winner would become the number one contender for the WWE Championship. Miz performed a running knee on Bryan for a near-fall. As The Miz tried for the Skull-Crushing Finale, Bryan reversed it into a small package to win the match. Following this, it was announced that Bryan would receive his WWE Championship match against AJ Styles at Crown Jewel.

=== Main event ===
In the main event, The Undertaker (accompanied by Kane) faced Triple H (accompanied by Shawn Michaels). Before the match officially began, it was announced that the match stipulation was changed to a No Disqualification match. In the climax, as The Undertaker had Michaels positioned for a Tombstone Piledriver, Triple H attacked The Undertaker with a sledgehammer, Michaels performed Sweet Chin Music on The Undertaker, and Triple H performed the Pedigree on The Undertaker to win the match. After the match, Triple H and Michaels helped The Undertaker to his feet. Kane (who had been put through a table midway through the match) entered the ring and the four men showed mutual respect. However, as they began to depart, The Undertaker and Kane attacked Triple H and Shawn Michaels and put Michaels through an announcer's table.

== Reception ==
The event was met with mixed to positive reception from critics; most negativity went to the match between Daniel Bryan and The Miz.

Anthony Mango of Bleacher Report said that "WWE Super Show-Down hurt its surrounding events and suffered from being crammed between Hell in a Cell and Evolution, which never gave it a chance to be anything but superfluous", stating that the event was "consisting of rematches of feuds that have gone on since SummerSlam or longer, pointless tag team contests with nothing on the line similar to an episode of Raw or SmackDown, one major fight capitalizing on nostalgia and only three titles on the line", stating that the event "wasn't look good heading into it".

Dave Meltzer of the Wrestling Observer Newsletter rated the matches of the event. The Cruiserweight Championship match and the WWE Championship match were the highest rated at 4.25 stars. The next highest was the six-man tag team match between The Shield and Strowman, McIntyre and Ziggler at 3.75 stars. The SmackDown Tag Team Championship match and the SmackDown Women's Championship match were both rated 3 stars. Rousey and The Bella Twins vs. The Riott Squad was rated 2.25 stars. The lowest rated matches were Cena and Lashley vs. Elias and Owens at 1.75 stars, The IIconics vs. Naomi and Asuka and Undertaker vs. Triple H at 1.25 stars, and Bryan vs. The Miz at 1 star.

== Aftermath ==
This was the only Super Show-Down held in Australia, as the following year, it became an annual event in Saudi Arabia and restylized as "Super ShowDown" (no hyphen). It was a short-lived event, however, as it was discontinued after 2020. Following this 2018 event, WWE did not return to Australia for another PPV and livestreaming event until Elimination Chamber in 2024.

=== Raw ===
Triple H and Shawn Michaels kicked off the following episode of Raw by addressing The Undertaker and Kane's attack following Triple H's victory. They stated that the respect that once existed between both sides was gone, leading Triple H and Michaels, the latter coming out of retirement, to reform D-Generation X and challenge The Brothers of Destruction to a tag team match at Crown Jewel on November 2. The match was later made official, marking Michaels' first match since WrestleMania XXVI in 2010, where he was retired by The Undertaker.

Also on Raw, Ronda Rousey and The Bella Twins (Nikki Bella and Brie Bella) defeated The Riott Squad (Ruby Riott, Liv Morgan, and Sarah Logan) in a rematch. The Bella Twins turned heel after the match by attacking Rousey. Later in the evening, it was announced that Rousey would defend the Raw Women's Championship against Nikki at Evolution on October 28.

The Shield (Roman Reigns, Seth Rollins, and Dean Ambrose) faced Braun Strowman, Drew McIntyre, and Dolph Ziggler in a rematch, where the latter team won. After the match, Ambrose walked away from Reigns and Rollins. Another match between the two teams took place the following week, where The Shield were victorious. After the match, Strowman turned on Ziggler, only for McIntyre to perform a Claymore Kick on Strowman.

=== SmackDown ===
During Super Show-Down, a SmackDown Women's Championship rematch between Becky Lynch and Charlotte Flair was announced for the following episode of SmackDown, where if Lynch got herself disqualified again, she would lose the title. The match ended in a double countout, after which, the two women brawled, with Flair getting the upper hand after sending Lynch through the LED wall. Later that night, SmackDown General Manager Paige announced that Lynch would defend the SmackDown Women's Championship against Flair in the first ever Last Woman Standing match at Evolution.

The Bar (Cesaro and Sheamus) and The New Day (Big E and Xavier Woods) had a rematch for the SmackDown Tag Team Championship on the October 16 episode of SmackDown where, thanks to interference from Big Show, Cesaro and Sheamus defeated Woods and Big E to win the titles. A title rematch between the two teams was later scheduled for Crown Jewel.

Daniel Bryan's match against AJ Styles for the WWE Championship was rescheduled to the October 30 episode of SmackDown after the two had a heated exchange on that same episode (in reality, this happened because Bryan refused to participate at Crown Jewel due to the controversy surrounding the event). Styles defeated Bryan via submission to retain the title. After the match, however, Samoa Joe attacked Bryan and Styles, and another match between Joe and Styles for the WWE Championship was subsequently scheduled for Crown Jewel.

== Results ==
No.	Results	Stipulations	Times
1	The New Day (Kofi Kingston and Xavier Woods) (c) (with Big E) defeated The Bar (Cesaro and Sheamus) by pinfall	Tag team match for the WWE SmackDown Tag Team Championship	9:40
2	Charlotte Flair defeated Becky Lynch (c) by disqualification	Singles match for the WWE SmackDown Women's Championship	10:50
3	John Cena and Bobby Lashley defeated Elias and Kevin Owens by pinfall	Tag team match	10:05
4	The IIconics (Billie Kay and Peyton Royce) defeated Asuka and Naomi by pinfall	Tag team match	5:45
5	AJ Styles (c) defeated Samoa Joe by submission	No Countout, No Disqualification match for the WWE Championship	23:45
6	Ronda Rousey and The Bella Twins (Brie Bella and Nikki Bella) defeated The Riott Squad (Ruby Riott, Liv Morgan, and Sarah Logan) by submission	Six-woman tag team match	10:05
7	Buddy Murphy defeated Cedric Alexander (c) by pinfall	Singles match for the WWE Cruiserweight Championship	10:35
8	The Shield (Dean Ambrose, Roman Reigns, and Seth Rollins) defeated Braun Strowman, Dolph Ziggler, and Drew McIntyre by pinfall	Six-man tag team match	19:40
9	Daniel Bryan defeated The Miz by pinfall	Singles match to determine the number one contender for the WWE Championship	2:25
10	Triple H (with Shawn Michaels) defeated The Undertaker (with Kane) by pinfall	No Disqualification match	27:35
(c) / – the champion(s) heading into the match

== See also ==
- 2018 in professional wrestling
- Professional wrestling in Australia
- WWE in Australia
