= WWE Super ShowDown =

WWE pay-per-view and livestreaming event series

- WWE Super ShowDown logo
- Promotions: WWE
- Brands: Raw (2018–2020); SmackDown (2018–2020); 205 Live (2018–2019)
- First event: 2018
- Last event: 2020

WWE Super ShowDown, originally stylized as Super Show-Down in 2018, was an annual professional wrestling event produced by the American promotion WWE. It was broadcast live and available only through pay-per-view (PPV) and WWE's livestreaming service, the WWE Network. Only three events were held from 2018 to 2020.

Each of the three iterations of the event only took place in countries outside the United States. The inaugural 2018 event was held in Australia and was WWE's first and only PPV and livestreaming event held in the country until Elimination Chamber in 2024. The final two events were held in Saudi Arabia as part of a 10-year partnership in support of Saudi Vision 2030. Due to the COVID-19 pandemic, the 2020 event, which was held a month before the pandemic took effect, was the last Super ShowDown held, as an event was not scheduled for 2021 and it was subsequently discontinued. Also due to the pandemic, the 2020 event was WWE's last international show until the company returned to Saudi Arabia with Crown Jewel in late 2021 after pandemic restrictions were lifted.

== History ==
In June 2018, the American professional wrestling promotion WWE announced that it would be returning to Australia to hold a pay-per-view (PPV) and WWE Network event, which would be the company's first PPV event produced in the country. The event was titled Super Show-Down and was held at Melbourne Cricket Ground in Melbourne, Victoria on October 6, 2018. Although WWE had held tours in Australia, the company's last big event to be held in the country was the Global Warning Tour in 2002.

Also in early 2018, WWE began a 10-year strategic multiplatform partnership with the General Sports Authority in support of Saudi Vision 2030, Saudi Arabia's social and economic reform program. The first PPV and WWE Network event under this partnership, the Greatest Royal Rumble, was held at the King Abdullah Sports City's King Abdullah International Stadium in Jeddah on April 27, 2018. In 2019, WWE held Super ShowDown (stylized without a dash) as their third event under this partnership, and subsequently the second event in the Super ShowDown chronology. The event was held on June 7, 2019, also at the King Abdullah International Stadium. A second Super ShowDown in Saudi Arabia was then held on February 27, 2020, at the Mohammed Abdu Arena on the Boulevard in Riyadh, thus making the event a recurring event in the Saudi Arabian partnership.

Due to the ongoing COVID-19 pandemic that began in mid-March 2020, an event was not held in 2021. COVID restrictions were lifted later that year, and WWE returned to Saudi Arabia with the Crown Jewel event in October. Super ShowDown was not included in WWE's initial PPV slate for 2022; the company's first PPV in Saudi Arabia for the year would ultimately be Elimination Chamber in February, and their only other Saudi Arabian PPV for 2022 was announced as Crown Jewel in November.

== Events ==
#	Event	Date	City	Venue	Main event	Ref
1	Super Show-Down (2018)	October 6, 2018	Melbourne, Victoria, Australia	Melbourne Cricket Ground	The Undertaker vs. Triple H in a No Disqualification match	
2	Super ShowDown (2019)	June 7, 2019	Jeddah, Makkah Region, Saudi Arabia	King Abdullah International Stadium	The Undertaker vs. Goldberg	
3	Super ShowDown (2020)	February 27, 2020	Riyadh, Saudi Arabia	Mohammed Abdu Arena on the Boulevard	"The Fiend" Bray Wyatt (c) vs. Goldberg for the WWE Universal Championship	
(c) – refers to the champion(s) heading into the match

== See also ==
- WWE in Australia
- WWE in Saudi Arabia
