= Super ShowDown (2020) =

WWE pay-per-view and livestreaming event

Super ShowDown سوبر شو داون (Arabic)
- Promotional poster featuring "The Fiend" Bray Wyatt and Goldberg
- Promotion: WWE
- Brand(s): Raw; SmackDown
- Date: February 27, 2020
- City: Riyadh, Saudi Arabia
- Venue: Mohammed Abdu Arena

WWE event chronology
← Previous; NXT TakeOver: Portland	Next → Elimination Chamber

WWE in Saudi Arabia chronology
← Previous; Crown Jewel (2019)	Next → Crown Jewel (2021)

Super ShowDown chronology
← Previous; 2019	Next → Final

The 2020 Super ShowDown was a professional wrestling pay-per-view (PPV) and livestreaming event produced by the American company WWE, held for wrestlers from the promotion's main roster brands, Raw and SmackDown. It was the third annual and final Super ShowDown and took place on Thursday, February 27, 2020, at the Mohammed Abdu Arena on the Boulevard in Riyadh, Saudi Arabia. The main card aired live at 8:00 p.m. Arabia Standard Time (12:00 p.m. Eastern Time).

This was the fifth event that WWE held in Saudi Arabia under a 10-year partnership in support of Saudi Vision 2030. This would also be the company's last event held outside the United States until the next Saudi Arabian event, Crown Jewel in October 2021, due to the COVID-19 pandemic that began taking effect shortly after Elimination Chamber in mid-March, with WWE holding all subsequent events behind closed doors at venues in the U.S. state of Florida until mid-July 2021 when the company resemued live touring.

Ten matches were contested at the event, including one on the Kickoff pre-show. In the main event, Goldberg defeated "The Fiend" Bray Wyatt to win SmackDown's Universal Championship for a second time, giving Wyatt's Fiend character his first loss. Goldberg also became the first wrestler to win a world championship after being inducted into the WWE Hall of Fame. Other prominent matches saw Brock Lesnar retain Raw's WWE Championship against Ricochet, Bayley defeated Naomi to retain the SmackDown Women's Championship in the penultimate match, which was the first women's championship match contested in the country, and Roman Reigns defeated King Corbin in a Steel Cage match. In the final live in-ring match of his career, The Undertaker made a surprise return as an unannounced entrant in the gauntlet match and lastly eliminated AJ Styles to win the Tuwaiq Mountain Trophy in the opening bout.

The event received negative reviews, with the Universal Championship and WWE Championship matches, the gauntlet match, and Reigns vs. Corbin being largely criticized, and the decision to have Goldberg defeat Wyatt being universally singled out as one of the worst booking decisions in history. However, the two tag team championship matches received some praise, with The New Day (Big E and Kofi Kingston) vs. The Miz and John Morrison for the SmackDown Tag Team Championship being singled out as the best match of the night by most critics. Several media outlets noted the hostile fan reaction to the event, in particular to Goldberg's win over Wyatt.

== Production ==
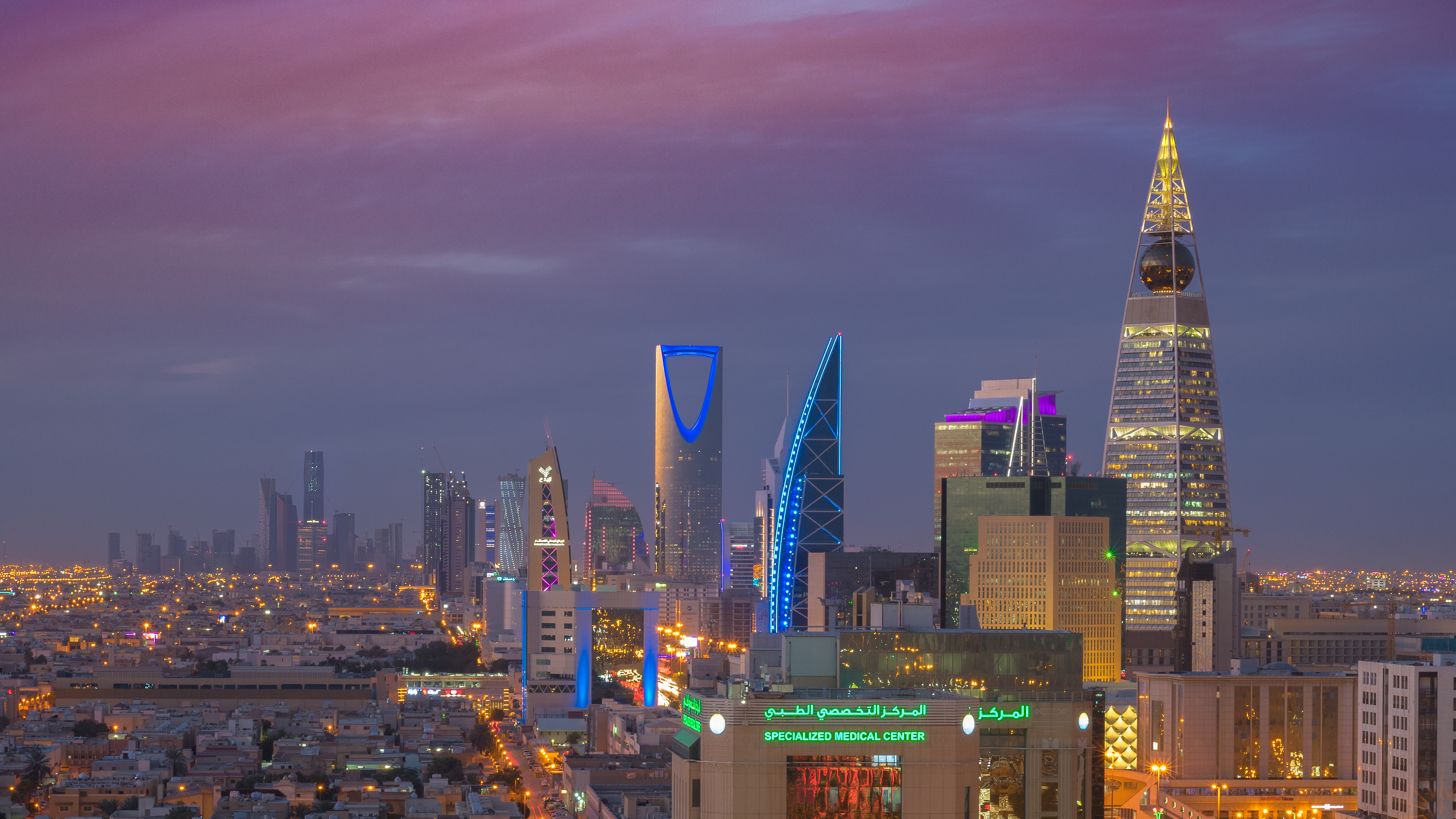
The third annual and final Super ShowDown was held at the Mohammed Abdu Arena on The Boulevard in Riyadh, Saudi Arabia (pictured).

=== Background ===
In early 2018, the American professional wrestling promotion WWE began a 10-year strategic multiplatform partnership with the General Sports Authority in support of Saudi Vision 2030, Saudi Arabia's social and economic reform program. After the first Super Show-Down was held in Australia in 2018, Super ShowDown (restylized without the dash) became one of the recurring pay-per-view (PPV) and livestreaming events for the Saudi Arabian partnership in 2019. A third Super ShowDown, and the fifth overall event in the Saudi Arabian partnership, was officially announced during the 2020 Royal Rumble. It was scheduled to be held at the Mohammed Abdu Arena on the Boulevard in Riyadh on Thursday, February 27, 2020, and feature wrestlers from the Raw and SmackDown brand divisions. The main card aired at 8:00 p.m. Arabia Standard Time (12:00 p.m. Eastern Time) on traditional PPV worldwide and was available to livestream on the WWE Network.

On January 30, 2020, wrestling journalist Mike Johnson of PWInsider reported that WWE Hall of Famer Hulk Hogan would make an appearance at the event. Prior to the event, The Undertaker, who was not announced for the event, was seen arriving with other WWE personnel at the airport in Riyadh.

=== Storylines ===
The event comprised 10 matches, including one on the Kickoff pre-show, that resulted from scripted storylines. Results were predetermined by WWE's writers on the Raw and SmackDown brands, while storylines were produced on WWE's weekly television shows, Monday Night Raw and Friday Night SmackDown.

On the February 7 episode of SmackDown, WWE Hall of Famer Goldberg was interviewed from his home via satellite. He stated that after watching the Royal Rumble, it made him want to get back in the ring—his last match was at SummerSlam in August 2019. With his old rival Brock Lesnar tied up with Ricochet and Drew McIntyre over Raw's WWE Championship, Goldberg turned his attention to SmackDown's Universal Championship, as he never received a rematch for the title after losing it to Lesnar back at WrestleMania 33 in April 2017. After Universal Champion Bray Wyatt interrupted Goldberg with a special news version of the Firefly Fun House, Goldberg challenged Wyatt's alter-ego "The Fiend" for the Universal Championship. Wyatt then stated that "The Fiend" accepted. The match was then scheduled for Super ShowDown.

After WWE announced that John Morrison—who last wrestled in WWE in November 2011—had re-signed with the company, Morrison made his first appearance on the January 3 episode of SmackDown in a brief backstage interview, coming out of The Miz's locker room. The two formally reunited the following week during a segment of "Miz TV", in which Morrison criticized the fans for turning on Miz the previous week after he attacked Kofi Kingston following his match. Miz and Morrison then began a rivalry with SmackDown Tag Team Champions The New Day (Big E and Kofi Kingston) in which Morrison defeated Kingston and Big E on the next two episodes, respectively. On the January 31 episode, Miz and Morrison won a fatal four-way tag team match to earn a championship match against The New Day at Super ShowDown.

On the January 6 episode of Raw, WWE Champion Brock Lesnar declared himself as the first entrant in the men's Royal Rumble match as he felt that no one was worthy of challenging him for the title. A few weeks later on the January 20 episode, Ricochet interrupted a promo by Paul Heyman and declared that he was not afraid to fight Lesnar and asked if Lesnar was scared to fight him. In response, Lesnar attacked Ricochet with a low blow and stated he was not scared. At the Royal Rumble, Lesnar dominated the first half of the Royal Rumble match until Ricochet entered as the 15th entrant. In response to what Lesnar did to him on Raw, Ricochet attacked Lesnar from behind with a low blow, which allowed eventual winner Drew McIntyre to eliminate him with a Claymore Kick. On the February 3 episode of Raw, Ricochet won a triple threat match to earn a WWE Championship opportunity against Lesnar at Super ShowDown.

At the Royal Rumble, Roman Reigns defeated King Corbin in a falls count anywhere match; both also unsuccessfully competed in the Royal Rumble match. Reigns and The Usos (Jey Uso and Jimmy Uso) then defeated Corbin, Dolph Ziggler, and Robert Roode on the following episode of SmackDown in a six-man tag team match, in which the losers ate dog food. The following week, Corbin stated that he should have won all of those matches and that he would have won the ones against Reigns had it not been for The Usos's interference. He then demanded one more match with Reigns, who came out and attacked Corbin, who managed to escape. Afterwards, Reigns accepted the challenge as a Steel Cage match, which was scheduled for Super ShowDown.

On the February 10 episode of Raw, a gauntlet match for the first-ever Tuwaiq Trophy was scheduled for Super ShowDown. AJ Styles, United States Champion Andrade, Bobby Lashley, Erick Rowan, R-Truth, and Rusev were announced for the match. Rusev, however, was removed from the match and replaced by Rey Mysterio on the February 24 episode of Raw.

At the Royal Rumble during the women's Royal Rumble match, Naomi made a surprise return following a six-month hiatus, while later on the show, Bayley successfully retained the SmackDown Women's Championship. On the following SmackDown, Bayley claimed that she had defeated every woman on the roster. Naomi interrupted, taking exception to the claim as Bayley had never defeated her. The following week, Naomi participated in a fatal four-way match to determine Bayley's next opponent, which was won by Carmella, who faced Bayley for the title on the February 14 episode; however, Bayley retained after using the ropes as leverage to pin Carmella. After the match, both Carmella and Naomi attacked Bayley. A match between Carmella and Naomi was then scheduled for the following week that Naomi won, thus earning her a title match against Bayley at Super ShowDown, marking the second women's match to be held in Saudi Arabia, but the first to be contested for a championship.

On the February 17 episode of Raw, after Kevin Owens and The Viking Raiders (Erik and Ivar) defeated Murphy and AOP (Akam and Rezar) via disqualification due to Seth Rollins's interference, The Street Profits (Angelo Dawkins and Montez Ford) came out and aided Owens and The Viking Raiders by attacking Murphy, Akam, and Rezar while Rollins retreated. Later, Rollins and Murphy were scheduled to defend the Raw Tag Team Championship against The Street Profits at Super ShowDown.

On the February 26 episode of The Bump, three further matches were announced for Super ShowDown. Saudi's own and NXT wrestler Mansoor was scheduled to face Dolph Ziggler, Humberto Carrillo was scheduled to face NXT's Angel Garza in a rematch from the February 24 episode of Raw, and The Viking Raiders (Erik and Ivar) were scheduled to face The O.C. (Luke Gallows and Karl Anderson) on the Super ShowDown Kickoff pre-show.

== Event ==
Other on-screen personnel
Role:	Name:
English commentators	Michael Cole
English commentators	Corey Graves
English commentators	Byron Saxton
Arabic commentators	Faisal Almughaisib
Arabic commentators	Jude Aldajani
Ring announcer	Mike Rome
Referees	Shawn Bennett
Referees	John Cone
Referees	Darrick Moore
Referees	Eddie Orengo
Referees	Chad Patton
Interviewer	Byron Saxton
Pre-show panel	Charly Caruso
Pre-show panel	Scott Stanford
Pre-show panel	David Otunga

=== Pre-show ===
During the Super ShowDown Kickoff pre-show, The Viking Raiders (Erik and Ivar) faced The O.C. (Luke Gallows and Karl Anderson). In the end, as Ivar attempted a moonsault on Anderson, the latter moved out of the way and tagged in Gallows. The O.C. then performed the Magic Killer on Ivar to win the match.

=== Preliminary matches ===
The actual pay-per-view opened with the Tuwaiq Mountain Trophy Gauntlet Match. The match began with R-Truth and Bobby Lashley (accompanied by Lana) as the first two participants. Truth eliminated Lashley with a roll up. After his elimination, Lashley attacked Truth. The third participant was United States Champion Andrade, who was eliminated after exchanging headbutts with Truth, after which, Truth landed onto Andrade for the pin. The fourth participant was Erick Rowan. During the match, Rowan threw Truth into the ring steps which knocked over Rowan's cage which was on top of the steps. An irate Rowan then attacked Truth with the steel steps, thus being eliminated by disqualification. The penultimate participant was AJ Styles, who eliminated Truth by submitting him with the Calf Crusher. The final participant was originally Rey Mysterio, however, Mysterio was attacked backstage by The O.C (Luke Gallows and Karl Anderson). Styles then claimed himself the winner by forfeit, however, the referee declared that Styles would only win by forfeit if Mysterio did not make it to the ring by the count of ten. As the referee counted, the camera cut backstage and showed that The O.C. were attacked by The Undertaker, who then made his entrance, taking Mysterio's place. Undertaker then performed a Chokeslam on a surprised Styles to win the match and the Tuwaiq Mountain Trophy.

Next, The New Day (Big E and Kofi Kingston) defended the SmackDown Tag Team Championships against The Miz and John Morrison. During the match, Kingston attempted a suicide dive on Miz who was outside the ring, only for Miz to avoid Kingston. Miz performed a Skull Crushing Finale on Big E for a nearfall. In the climax, Morrison attacked Kingston with a chair and Miz rolled up Kingston to win the titles.

After that, Humberto Carrillo faced Angel Garza. In the end, Garza rolled up Carrillo to win the match.

In the fourth match, Seth Rollins and Murphy defended the Raw Tag Team Championship against The Street Profits (Angelo Dawkins and Montez Ford). In the end, Murphy performed a Ripcord Knee on Dawkins, who fell onto the bottom ring rope, allowing Rollins to perform The Stomp on Dawkins. Murphy then pinned Dawkins to retain the titles.

Next, Mansoor faced Dolph Ziggler (accompanied by Robert Roode). Before the match officially began, Roode had an altercation with Mansoor, after which, Mansoor attacked Roode. This resulted in the referee ejecting Roode from ringside. In the end, Mansoor performed a Moonsault on Ziggler to win the match. Following the match, Mansoor gave a heartwarming speech to his hometown crowd.

After that, Brock Lesnar (accompanied by Paul Heyman) defended the WWE Championship against Ricochet. As soon as the match began, Lesnar blocked a Ricochet dropkick before performing a vertical suplex. Lesnar then performed three German suplexes and an F-5 on Ricochet to retain the title in ninety seconds.

Next, Roman Reigns fought King Corbin in a Steel Cage match. Reigns was carrying a chain around his neck and as Reigns locked the cage door with it, Corbin attacked Reigns. During the match, Corbin managed to unlock the cage door. As Corbin tried to escape, Reigns attacked Corbin with the cage door. Corbin mocked Reigns and attempted to perform his own Superman Punch on Reigns but with the chain wrapped around his fist, however, Reigns intercepted Corbin with one of his own for a nearfall. In the end, Reigns performed a Superman Punch (with the chain wrapped around his fist) on Corbin to win the match.

In the penultimate match, Bayley defended the SmackDown Women's Championship against Naomi. The end saw Bayley trap Naomi's leg in her shirt and perform a facebuster on Naomi to retain the title. Due to Saudi Arabian modesty laws, both women wore full body suits and t-shirts, though while Bayley's was an all-black body suit, Naomi's was colourful to match her glow gimmick.

=== Main event ===
In the main event, "The Fiend" Bray Wyatt defended the WWE Universal Championship against Goldberg. After a stare down, Goldberg surprised The Fiend with a Spear for a nearfall. Then, The Fiend performed a Mandible Claw on Goldberg, who managed to power out of it and performed three more Spears on The Fiend for a nearfall. Then, The Fiend performed a second Mandible Claw on Goldberg, who managed to power out of it again and performed a Jackhammer on The Fiend for a pinfall, winning the WWE Universal Championship for a second time and becoming the first wrestler to win a world championship after being inducted into the WWE Hall of Fame. This also gave The Fiend his first loss since the debut of the character. Aftermath, The Fiend quickly rose to his feet and stared down a celebrating Goldberg, only for the lights to go out. When the lights came back, The Fiend had disappeared.

== Reception ==
The event received overall negative reactions from fans and critics, with the matches for the Tuwaiq Trophy, the WWE Championship, and the Universal Championship being near-universally panned. Jason Powell of Pro Wrestling Dot Net calling it "not a hot show" and gave a negative review, while Nolan Howell of Slam! Sports did the same, calling it "boring" and stating, "The most you can hope for is these shows [in Saudi Arabia] ending up being inoffensive and this show JUST managed to make it past that mark." Elton Jones of Heavy stated that it continued WWE's habit of weak pay-per-views in Saudi Arabia, calling it "yet another subpar show full of basic bouts that belong on a house show, puzzling booking decisions, and only one or two worthwhile matches worth watching again." Larry Csonka of 411Mania gave the event a 4.5/10 rating, while Daniel Van Boom of CNET stated that "the overwhelming majority of the card was just OK. Not terrible, not good, just there." The negative fan reaction to the event (most notably to Goldberg's win) was noted by various media outlets; the hashtag "CancelWWENetwork" became a trending topic, similarly to other poorly received recent WWE events. Sports Illustrated stated that fans were "incandescent about what took place".

The WWE Championship and Universal Championship matches were both universally panned for their short lengths, and for damaging the credibility of their respective losers, in particular Wyatt's. Adam Silverstein and Brent Brookhouse of CBS Sports gave the WWE Championship match a D rating (the lowest on the card), calling it "a complete waste of time and another nail in the coffin that is Ricochet's WWE booking." They rated the Universal Championship match a D+ and panned the booking, stating: "The length of the match made sense due to Goldberg's age and energy level, but the fact that he was able to beat The Fiend so easily whereas a dozen Stomps from Seth Rollins followed by tons of weapon shots [referring to Hell in a Cell 2019] could not put him down makes absolutely no booking sense. That's not to mention the fact that a 53-year-old Goldberg went over a guy in Wyatt who WWE has been building up specifically for 'Mania over the last four-plus months in 2:57."

The Tuwaiq Trophy match was criticized for its length and twist ending, with some critics comparing the finish to Shane McMahon's panned win of the WWE World Cup at the Crown Jewel event in 2018, which also took place in Saudi Arabia. Pro Wrestling Dot Net called the match "ridiculous". 411Mania also compared it to the WWE World Cup by stating that "[WWE] killed another Saudi special match with a winner that wasn't even involved."; they gave the match a 1/5 rating, stating "this was bad, long for the sake of being long".

Conversely, the two tag team championship matches were praised, with the SmackDown Tag Team Championship match being singled out as the best match of the night by most. CBS Sports described the SmackDown Tag Team Championship match to have "very good tag action," particularly complimenting the performances of John Morrison and Kofi Kingston. They also described the Raw Tag Team Championship match as an "exciting, entertaining match that [had] easily stolen the show to [that] point." Heavy named the SmackDown match the Match of the Night, giving it a 3.5/5 rating and stating that "props goes out to both of these teams for a job well done. [...] What we got here was a fun, well-paced matchup that was capped off by a welcome title change." They also gave the Raw match a 3/5 rating, calling it "a fun and solid affair." Pro Wrestling Dot Net also reacted positively towards the SmackDown tag team title match, stating that it had "good action down the stretch." The tag team championship matches were the only matches to receive a rating average or above from Slam! Sports, who stated about The SmackDown tag team title match: "Miz and Morrison aren't missing a beat in their return and their cutting off New Day comebacks played really well here" and rating it 3.25/5, the highest-rated match of the card.

The event would be voted as the Worst Major Wrestling Show of 2020 by readers of the Wrestling Observer Newsletter.

== Aftermath ==
=== SmackDown ===
New Universal Champion Goldberg appeared on the following night's episode of SmackDown and issued an open challenge that was accepted by Roman Reigns. The match was scheduled for WrestleMania 36, though due to concerns over Reigns' health because of the COVID-19 pandemic, he was replaced by Braun Strowman in the match.

Following his loss to Goldberg, "The Fiend" Bray Wyatt appeared on the following night's episode of SmackDown and confronted a returning John Cena, who was seemingly announcing his retirement. The Fiend challenged Cena to a match at WrestleMania 36, and Cena accepted.

SmackDown Women's Champion Bayley refused to face Naomi in a rematch, stating that she already defeated her at Super ShowDown. Bayley then introduced a returning Sasha Banks and she and Bayley proceeded to attack Naomi. Lacey Evans came out to even the odds and a tag team match featuring Evans and Naomi against Banks and Bayley was scheduled. Naomi and Evans won with Naomi pinning Bayley. A rematch between the two teams took place the following week, where Banks and Bayley won. Bayley was eventually scheduled to defend her title in a fatal five-way elimination match against the other three women, as well as a returning Tamina, at WrestleMania 36.

After winning the SmackDown Tag Team Championship, The Miz and John Morrison were scheduled to defend the titles in a tag team Elimination Chamber match at Elimination Chamber. The challengers announced for the match were former champions The New Day (Big E and Kofi Kingston), The Usos (Jey Uso and Jimmy Uso), Heavy Machinery (Otis and Tucker), Lucha House Party (Lince Dorado and Gran Metalik), and Dolph Ziggler and Robert Roode. The following week, Ziggler and Roode defeated all the other teams in a tag team gauntlet match to enter the match last.

=== Raw ===
On the following Raw, a disgruntled AJ Styles mocked The Undertaker for still wrestling and issued a warning. The Undertaker in turn cost Styles his match at Elimination Chamber. Styles eventually challenged Undertaker to a match at WrestleMania 36 as a Boneyard match that Undertaker accepted, cutting a promo akin to his "American Bad Ass" gimmick (circa 2000–2003). Following this non-live cinematic match, The Undertaker retired from the industry, rendering his Super ShowDown bout the final live in-ring match of his career.

On the following Raw, The Street Profits (Angelo Dawkins and Montez Ford) were given one final opportunity at the Raw Tag Team Championship where they defeated Rollins and Murphy to win the titles. Another rematch was then scheduled for Elimination Chamber.

Also on Raw, Humberto Carrillo teamed with Rey Mysterio to face Angel Garza and United States Champion Andrade. Carrillo pinned Andrade, earning a title match at Elimination Chamber.

=== Future ===
Due to the COVID-19 pandemic, a Super ShowDown event was not held in 2021. COVID restrictions were lifted later that year, and WWE returned to Saudi Arabia with the Crown Jewel event in October. That same month, the company revealed their PPV calendar for 2022, and Super ShowDown was not included. WWE's two Saudi Arabian PPVs for 2022 would be Elimination Chamber in February, and Crown Jewel in November.

== Results ==
No.	Results	Stipulations	Times
1^{P}	The O.C. (Luke Gallows and Karl Anderson) defeated The Viking Raiders (Erik and Ivar) by pinfall	Tag team match	9:58
2	The Undertaker won by last eliminating AJ Styles by pinfall (Note: The Undertaker replaced Rey Mysterio due to Mysterio being injured by The O.C. in a pre-match attack.)	Gauntlet match for the Tuwaiq Mountain Trophy	32:27
3	The Miz and John Morrison defeated The New Day (Big E and Kofi Kingston) (c) by pinfall	Tag team match for the WWE SmackDown Tag Team Championship	13:17
4	Angel Garza defeated Humberto Carrillo by pinfall	Singles match	9:13
5	Seth Rollins and Murphy (c) defeated The Street Profits (Angelo Dawkins and Montez Ford) by pinfall	Tag team match for the WWE Raw Tag Team Championship	10:35
6	Mansoor defeated Dolph Ziggler by pinfall	Singles match	9:21
7	Brock Lesnar (with Paul Heyman) (c) defeated Ricochet by pinfall	Singles match for the WWE Championship	1:35
8	Roman Reigns defeated King Corbin by pinfall	Steel Cage match	12:59
9	Bayley (c) defeated Naomi by pinfall	Singles match for the WWE SmackDown Women's Championship	11:33
10	Goldberg defeated "The Fiend" Bray Wyatt (c) by pinfall	Singles match for the WWE Universal Championship	3:08
(c) / – the champion(s) heading into the match; P / – the match was broadcast on the pre-show

=== Tuwaiq Trophy Gauntlet match ===
Eliminated	Wrestler	Entered	Eliminated by	Method	Time
1	Bobby Lashley	2	R-Truth	Pinfall	5:40
2	Andrade	3	R-Truth	Pinfall	10:50
3	Erick Rowan	4	R-Truth	Disqualification	13:20
4	R-Truth	1	AJ Styles	Submission	16:00
5	AJ Styles	5	The Undertaker	Pinfall	21:44
Winner	The Undertaker	6	—N/a		21:44
