= Super ShowDown (2019) =

WWE pay-per-view and livestreaming event

Super ShowDown سوبر شو داون (Arabic)
- Promotional poster featuring The Undertaker and Goldberg
- Promotion: WWE
- Brand(s): Raw; SmackDown; 205 Live
- Date: June 7, 2019
- City: Jeddah, Saudi Arabia
- Venue: King Abdullah International Stadium
- Attendance: 21,000

WWE event chronology
← Previous; NXT TakeOver: XXV	Next → Stomping Grounds

WWE in Saudi Arabia chronology
← Previous; Crown Jewel (2018)	Next → Crown Jewel (2019)

Super ShowDown chronology
← Previous; 2018	Next → 2020

The 2019 Super ShowDown was a professional wrestling pay-per-view (PPV) and livestreaming event produced by the American company WWE, held for wrestlers from the promotion's main roster brands, Raw, SmackDown, and 205 Live. It was the second annual Super ShowDown (restylized from "Super Show-Down" the prior year) and took place on Friday, June 7, 2019, at the King Abdullah International Stadium in Jeddah, Saudi Arabia. It was the third event that WWE held in Saudi Arabia under a 10-year partnership in support of Saudi Vision 2030 and the main card aired live at 9:00 p.m. Arabia Standard Time (2:00 p.m. Eastern Time).

Ten matches were contested at the event, including one on the Kickoff pre-show. In the main event, The Undertaker defeated Goldberg in what was their first and only match against each other. Other prominent matches saw Shane McMahon defeat Roman Reigns, Kofi Kingston defeated Dolph Ziggler to retain SmackDown's WWE Championship, Randy Orton defeated Triple H, which was ultimately Triple H's final match to take place on a PPV and livestreaming event and in front of a live crowd before having to retire in 2022 due to a cardiac event, and in the opening bout, Seth Rollins defeated Baron Corbin to retain Raw's Universal Championship. The event was also notable for having WWE's largest standard battle royal with a total of 51 participants, though originally scheduled for 50. It was won by Mansoor, a WWE rookie from Saudi Arabia who signed with the company following 2018's Greatest Royal Rumble event and had appeared on NXT and NXT UK.

The event received generally negative reviews by critics, with the main event being particularly criticized as one of the worst wrestling matches of all time. It later won the Wrestling Observer Newsletter Award for Worst Major Wrestling Show of 2019. Like the prior two PPV and livestreaming events in Saudi Arabia, there were no women's matches on the card due to the limited rights women had in the country. WWE had attempted to add a women's match, but it was ultimately rejected by the Saudi Arabian government. This would be the last to not include any women's matches as the country began to allow it beginning with Crown Jewel in October.

== Production ==
=== Background ===
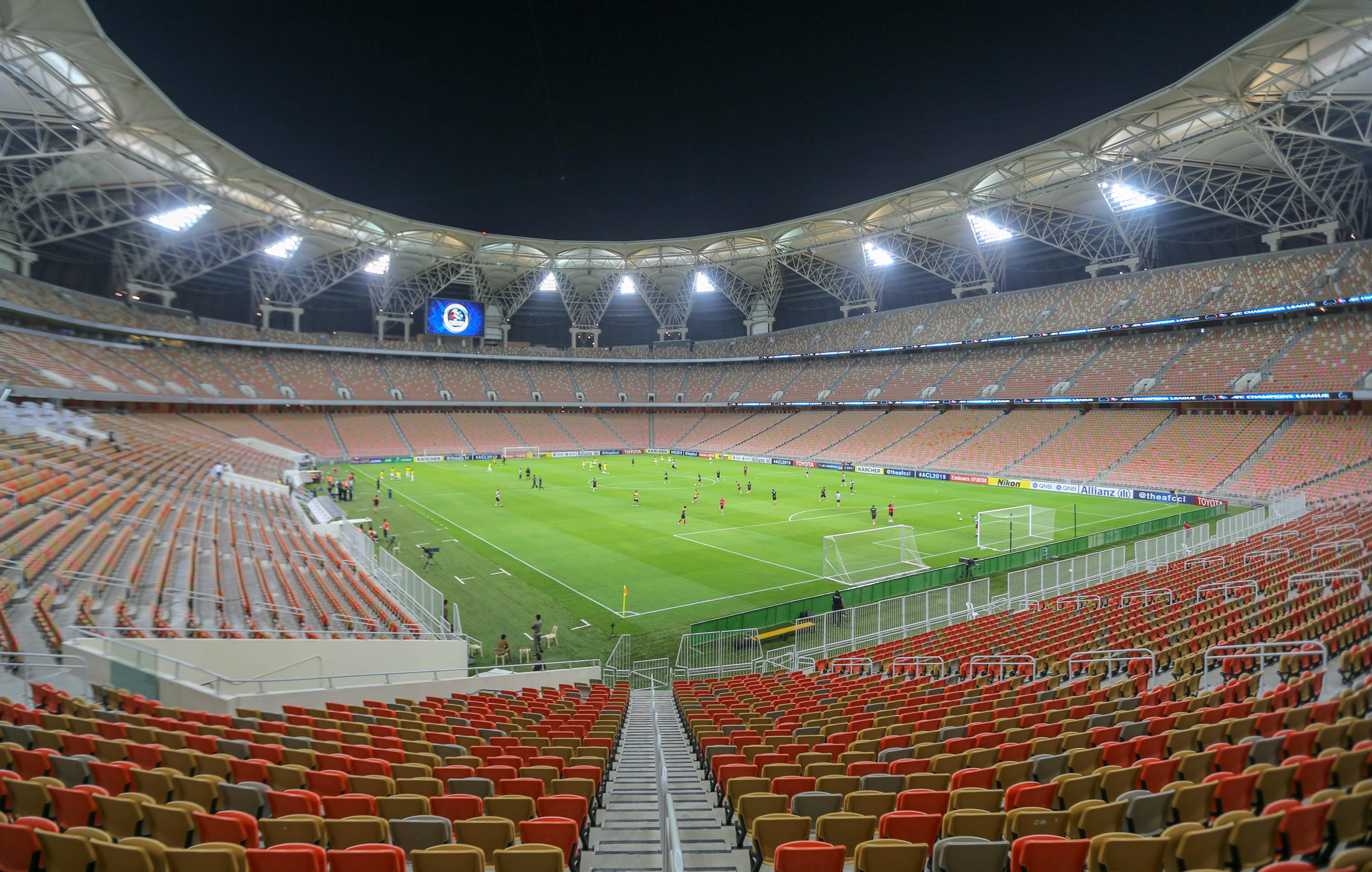
The second annual Super ShowDown was held at the King Abdullah International Stadium in Jeddah, Saudi Arabia.

In early 2018, the American professional wrestling promotion WWE began a 10-year strategic multiplatform partnership with the General Sports Authority in support of Saudi Vision 2030, Saudi Arabia's social and economic reform program. After holding the Greatest Royal Rumble and Crown Jewel events in 2018, the third pay-per-view (PPV) and livestreaming event under this partnership was announced as Super ShowDown. It was originally planned for early May, before Ramadan, but was pushed back to after Ramadan, with it scheduled to be held on Friday, June 7, 2019, at the King Abdullah International Stadium in Jeddah and featured wrestlers from the Raw, SmackDown, and 205 Live brands. In addition to the main card airing live at 9:00 p.m. Arabia Standard Time (2:00 p.m. Eastern Time) on traditional PPV worldwide, it was livestreamed on the WWE Network. This also marked the second annual Super ShowDown, the first of which was held in October 2018 in Australia. That original event had stylized the title as "Super Show-Down" while this second event changed the stylization and removed the dash.

=== Wrestlers absent from the event ===
Similarly to the two previous WWE in Saudi Arabia events—Greatest Royal Rumble and Crown Jewel (both the previous year)—several WWE wrestlers were not authorized or refused to participate at Super ShowDown due to it taking place in Saudi Arabia.

John Cena and Daniel Bryan, both of whom had previously refused to participate for the Crown Jewel event in the wake of the assassination of Jamal Khashoggi, also refused to participate at Super ShowDown. Bryan's reasons to refuse to appear at Crown Jewel had also reportedly included the treatment of LGBT people by the country and because of Sami Zayn's ban from the Greatest Royal Rumble event.

WWE chose not to put Aleister Black on the show, reportedly because of fears that the religious symbolism on some of his tattoos would be offensive to their Saudi hosts.

Sami Zayn, who had previously not been authorized to compete at the Greatest Royal Rumble due to being of Syrian descent, as Saudi Arabia has strained relations with Syria, also declined participating at Super ShowDown. Kevin Owens also refused to participate at Super ShowDown in support of Zayn, his friend. Owens was reportedly slated to face Kofi Kingston for the WWE Championship, leading WWE to schedule Dolph Ziggler, who had been inactive since January to focus on his stand-up comedy career, to replace him.

Due to the limited rights women had in Saudi Arabia, all WWE female wrestlers were banned from participating in WWE events in the country. Just hours before Super ShowDown, however, reports emerged that WWE were attempting to add a women's match to the card, which would have seen Alexa Bliss face Natalya. The two women joined WWE personnel for the trip, but the match was ultimately rejected by the Saudi Arabian government.

=== Storylines ===
The event comprised ten matches, including one on the Kickoff pre-show, that resulted from scripted storylines. Results were predetermined by WWE's writers on the Raw, SmackDown, and 205 Live brands, while storylines were produced on WWE's weekly television shows, Monday Night Raw and SmackDown Live.

On May 13, 2019, a match between Goldberg and The Undertaker was scheduled for Super ShowDown, marking the first one-on-one match between each other. Goldberg's last match occurred at WrestleMania 33 in April 2017.

A match between Triple H and Randy Orton was also scheduled on May 13. A promo aired during the May 21 episode of SmackDown, recapping the two's various rivalries that originally began in 2004 when Orton won the now retired World Heavyweight Championship, resulting in Triple H turning on him and kicking him out of their stable, Evolution.

Also on May 13, a 50-man battle royal was scheduled, marking the largest standard battle royal in WWE history.

A match between Braun Strowman and Bobby Lashley was scheduled on May 18. On the June 3 episode of Raw, Strowman and Lashley competed in an arm wrestling match which Strowman won, afterwards, Lashley attacked Strowman with a Running Powerslam.

On the April 15 episode of Raw, Andrade defeated Intercontinental Champion Finn Bálor in a non-title match. Bálor was subsequently moved to SmackDown the following night during the Superstar Shake-up. Andrade, along with his manager Zelina Vega, were then moved back to SmackDown the following week, and both Bálor and Andrade took part in the men's Money in the Bank ladder match at the namesake event, where both fought each other, though ultimately lost the match. Earlier that day, Bálor was scheduled to defend the Intercontinental Championship against Andrade at Super ShowDown.

On the April 16 episode of SmackDown, after WWE Chairman and Chief Executive Officer Vince McMahon had introduced Elias as "the biggest acquisition in SmackDown history", they were interrupted by fellow new draftee Roman Reigns, who attacked Elias and performed a superman punch on Mr. McMahon. The following week, Shane McMahon challenged Reigns to a fight for attacking his father. As Reigns came out, he was attacked from behind by Elias, who was then assisted by Shane in attacking Reigns. On the May 20 episode of Raw, Reigns, who appeared via the wild card rule, was interrupted by Shane, who was still bothered by Reigns' attack on his father. Reigns then challenged Shane to a match which Shane accepted for Super ShowDown.

On the May 21 episode of SmackDown, Raw's Dolph Ziggler, who had been inactive since the Royal Rumble event in January, made a surprise return and attacked Kofi Kingston. Ziggler, appearing via the wild card rule, later explained that it should have been him who got the opportunity to go to WrestleMania 35 and win the WWE Championship instead of Kingston. He then stated he would defeat Kingston for the title at Super ShowDown, which was made official.

At Money in the Bank, Seth Rollins retained the Universal Championship against AJ Styles. On Raw the next night, Baron Corbin took offense that Styles earned that title shot even though Corbin had previously pinned Rollins in a tag team match. The following week, Styles was scheduled to take part in a four-way match for another opportunity against Rollins at Super ShowDown, but was still ailing from injuries sustained from his match at Money in the Bank, and was replaced by Corbin, who attacked Styles while the latter was in a trainer's room. Corbin then defeated Braun Strowman, Bobby Lashley, and The Miz in a fatal four-way elimination match to earn the title match.

At Money in the Bank, as Lucha House Party (Kalisto, Gran Metalik, and Lince Dorado) came out for a match, they were randomly attacked by Lars Sullivan and the match never occurred. The following night on Raw, as Sullivan was about to be interviewed in regard to the incident, Lucha House Party interrupted and attacked Sullivan, who fended them off. A 3-on-1 handicap match pitting Sullivan against Lucha House Party was then scheduled for Super ShowDown.

After being drafted to Raw in the Superstar Shake-up, The Usos (Jey Uso and Jimmy Uso) began a rivalry with The Revival (Scott Dawson and Dash Wilder) where The Usos repeatedly embarrassed Revival on numerous occasions. The two teams faced off on the May 20 episode of Raw, where The Revival were victorious. Another match was then scheduled for the Super ShowDown Kickoff pre-show.

== Event ==
Other on-screen personnel
Role:	Name:
English commentators	Michael Cole
English commentators	Corey Graves
English commentators	Renee Young
Arabic commentators	Faisal Almughaisib
Arabic commentators	Sultan Alharbi
Arabic commentators	Jude Aldajani
Ring announcer	Greg Hamilton
Referees	Jason Ayers
Referees	Shawn Bennett
Referees	Mike Chioda
Referees	John Cone
Referees	Dan Engler
Referees	Charles Robinson
Interviewer	Byron Saxton
Pre-show panel	Charly Caruso
Pre-show panel	David Otunga
Pre-show panel	Beth Phoenix

=== Pre-show ===
During the Super ShowDown Kickoff pre-show, The Usos (Jey Uso and Jimmy Uso) faced The Revival (Scott Dawson and Dash Wilder). In the end, Jimmy and Jey performed a Superkick on Dawson and Wilder, respectively, followed by a double Superkick on Dawson to win the match.

=== Preliminary matches ===
The actual pay-per-view opened with Seth Rollins defending the Universal Championship against Baron Corbin. Corbin focused on Rollins' injured ribs for the majority of the match. During the match, Corbin continuously argued with referee John Cone whenever Rollins kicked out of a pin. The end came when Corbin attempted to use a chair, only for Cone to intervene, leading to another argument between Corbin and Cone. Rollins took advantage of the situation and rolled-up Corbin to retain the title. After the match, Corbin attacked Rollins with the End of Days. A chair wielding Brock Lesnar then came out, alongside Paul Heyman, to cash in his Money in the Bank contract on Rollins. As Heyman was getting in the ring to hand the contract to the referee, Heyman tripped on the ring rope, which distracted Lesnar. Rollins performed a low blow on Lesnar, attacked him with the steel chair, and performed The Stomp on him on top of the briefcase. Due to Heyman's accident, the contract was never cashed in, thus Lesnar kept the contract.

Next, "The Demon" Finn Bálor defended the Intercontinental Championship against Andrade. In the end, Bálor performed the 1916 on Andrade off the top rope followed by the Coup de Grâce to retain the title.

After that, Roman Reigns faced Shane McMahon (who was accompanied by Drew McIntyre). As Reigns attempted a Superman Punch, Shane performed a chop block on Reigns mid-air. Shane applied a Triangle Choke on Reigns, only for Reigns to lift Shane up for a Powerbomb. Shane performed a Spear on Reigns for a nearfall. In the end, Reigns punched Shane, causing Shane to bump into the referee. With the referee down, McIntyre performed a Claymore Kick on Reigns, allowing Shane to pin Reigns to win the match.

After that, Lars Sullivan faced Lucha House Party (Kalisto, Gran Metalik, and Lince Dorado) in a 3-on-1 handicap match. Sullivan dominated most of the match until Lucha House Party ganged up on Sullivan, causing them to be disqualified. After the match, Sullivan ran up the ramp and attacked the trio.

Next, Triple H faced Randy Orton in their first one-on-one match since 2010. It would also be Triple H's final match to take place on a pay-per-view and in front of a live crowd before his cardiac event in late 2021 which caused him to retire the following year. Orton performed an RKO on Triple H for a nearfall. As Orton then went for the Punt Kick, Triple H caught Orton's foot and performed a Pedigree on Orton for a nearfall. Triple H applied the Crossface on Orton, only for Orton to reach the ropes to force the break. Outside the ring, Triple H dropped Orton on an announce table several times. In the end, Orton performed a second RKO on Triple H to win the match.

In the next match, Braun Strowman faced Bobby Lashley. Lashley performed a Running Powerslam on Strowman for a nearfall. Strowman performed a Running Powerslam of his own on Lashley for a nearfall. In the end, Strowman performed two Running Powerslams on Lashley to win the match.

Next, Kofi Kingston (accompanied by Xavier Woods) defended the WWE Championship against Dolph Ziggler. Kingston performed an S.O.S. on Ziggler for a nearfall. In the end, Ziggler performed a Superkick on Woods outside the ring and while the referee was distracted, Woods kicked Ziggler, which allowed Kingston to perform Trouble in Paradise on Ziggler to retain the title.

The penultimate match was the originally scheduled 50-man over the top rope battle royal, but had 51 participants. Mansoor, an NXT wrestler from Saudi Arabia, last eliminated Elias to win the match.

=== Main event ===
The main event was the first time ever match between The Undertaker and Goldberg. Goldberg started by executing two Spears on The Undertaker for a near-fall. After this, The Undertaker performed his signature sit-up. As The Undertaker attempted a Chokeslam, Goldberg countered into a Leg-Lock Submission Hold, however, The Undertaker was able to reach the ropes. As Goldberg went for a third Spear, The Undertaker dodged and caused Goldberg to collide with the ring post, busting his head open and receiving a concussion. This gave The Undertaker the advantage for the rest of the match and was able to perform an Old School, a Chokeslam, and a Tombstone Piledriver for a nearfall. Goldberg countered a Big Boot and performed another Spear. Goldberg then followed up with a Jackhammer for a nearfall. As Goldberg attempted a Tombstone Piledriver, both men fell (the last of several botches that occurred during the match mainly due to Goldberg's accident). The Undertaker then performed a second Chokeslam on Goldberg to win the match.

== Reception ==
The event received negative reviews by critics, with the main event and its ending being particularly criticized.

Dave Meltzer of the Wrestling Observer Newsletter wrote that Super Showdown "wasn't much of a show. It got among the worst poll results in our history", with 99.5% of the newsletter's 192 respondents giving a "thumbs down" to the show (only one voter gave the show a "thumbs up" rating). Meltzer declared that the crowd of 21,000 was "nowhere close to full" just like last year's show, and that the show was highly likely to be the least-watched WWE main-roster pay-per-view of 2019. The only positive for Meltzer was the great crowd reception to Mansoor's win, but "that ended up meaning nothing" when Mansoor failed to appear on WWE's next shows. Meltzer concluded that in doing the show, WWE "came for $40 million in cash, and overlooked their espoused public views on women, diversity and bigotry to collect the cash. They cloaked it with their own propaganda, the idea they were there to put smiles on kids faces".

Wade Keller of Pro Wrestling Torch declared that the event was "absolutely nothing worth going out of your way to watch", with no matches even reaching 3 out of 5 stars, attributing this to "the heat", which would affect the wrestlers' workrate, "and perhaps general karma". The highest rated match was Orton-HHH at 2.75, which was well received by the live crowd and had "the right finish", but was "needlessly long". Keller rated Balor-Andrade 2: "utterly uninspired and forgettable", while Kingston-Ziggler received 1.5: "Decent, but entirely skippable." Keller rated Goldberg-Undertaker 0.75, as too "ambitious".

Justin Barrasso of Sports Illustrated described that the event's "entire card was nowhere near the level set at the Money in the Bank pay per view in May", and that WWE's continued partnership with the Kingdom of Saudi Arabia "is not a good look." Barasso felt that Shane McMahon's victory "was the right call"; that the main event saw "two legends struggle to deliver", and that the house show "formula is now a bit antiquated", resulting in such shows like Super Showdown failing to "meet the hype". Also, the "booking didn't help" as "another promised Brock Lesnar "Money in the Bank" cash-in failed to take place", while two babyface champions in Seth Rollins and Kofi Kingston failed to win solely on their own merits.

Jason Powell of Pro Wrestling Dot Net wrote that "the show was uneventful and felt longer than it actually was." The first six minutes of the main event "was the only portion of the show that lived up to the billing of this event being on par with WrestleMania", but then the main event ended in a "really bad" manner. Powell remarked that it was "strange" how the Lucha House Party were protected by the disqualification match finish, but were steamrolled by Sullivan after the match. Powell described Balor-Andrade as "decent and yet unmemorable". Meanwhile, the Usos-Revival tag match on the pre-show was "quick and solid".

Mike Tedesco of WrestleView stated that Super Showdown was "just a show with a bad main event" that featured an "awful" ending. For the other matches, Tedesco felt the battle royale "absolutely stunk" due to the overcrowded ring; Strowman-Lashley was "nothing special", Rollins-Corbin was "basic", but Balor-Andrade was "awesome". HHH-Orton was "a little too long", and would have been better if it had "been cut in half".

The main event was heavily criticized. NXT superstar Matt Riddle criticized Goldberg, calling him "the worst wrestler in the business" and "unsafe, dangerous and a liability to everyone else". However, pro wrestlers Mark Henry and Ric Flair defended the participants. Flair said both of them had a bad match due to not being regular wrestlers and Goldberg came out of retirement. Henry said "both deserve better than that", since Goldberg ended the match despite his concussion. Goldberg called his match against Undertaker "the perfect storm of crappiness", while Undertaker himself called it "a disaster". Dave Meltzer, during the Wrestling Observer Radio, said that "Most of the people knew they shouldn't have gone" and some of them knew the booking would be "horrible". Samoa Joe, who wrestled in the battle royal, called the match "a chaotic scene" and said of the temperature, "It was quite the inferno in that ring".

The event was named "Worst Major Wrestling show" at the 2019 Wrestling Observer Newsletter awards.

== Aftermath ==
Following the 50-man battle royal at Super ShowDown, several matches were confirmed for WWE's next event, Stomping Grounds. These included a rematch between Universal Champion Seth Rollins and Baron Corbin, a rematch between WWE Champion Kofi Kingston and Dolph Ziggler in a Steel Cage match, a match between Roman Reigns and Drew McIntyre, and a rematch from Money in the Bank between Raw Women's Champion Becky Lynch and Lacey Evans.

Ali, who participated in the battle royal, donated the money he earned from Super ShowDown to Charity: Water.

=== Raw ===
On the following Raw, Baron Corbin was granted permission from WWE officials to choose a special guest referee for his rematch with Seth Rollins.

The Revival (Scott Dawson and Dash Wilder) and The Usos (Jey Uso and Jimmy Uso) both competed in a triple threat match against Raw Tag Team Champions Curt Hawkins and Zack Ryder which The Revival won to become the new champions.

Lars Sullivan and Lucha House Party had a rematch that was a 3-on-1 handicap elimination match that Sullivan won.

Braun Strowman and Bobby Lashley competed in a six-man tag team match in which Strowman teamed with The Miz and Ricochet to defeat the team of Lashley, Samoa Joe, and Cesaro. All of them also claimed their stakes for the United States Championship. The following week, during the fatal five-way elimination match to determine the new number one contender for the title, after Strowman eliminated Cesaro and Lashley, they aided in eventual winner Ricochet eliminating him. On the June 24 episode, Lashley and Strowman took part in a tug-of-war. Strowman was victorious, but afterwards, Lashley blinded him with the rope. They faced each other in a Falls Count Anywhere match on the July 1 episode, which ended in a no-contest when Strowman drove himself and Lashley through the LED board. This led to a Last Man Standing match between the two being scheduled for Extreme Rules.

Due to the incident at Super ShowDown, Paul Heyman stated that they would not reveal when Brock Lesnar decides to cash in his Money in the Bank contract.

Shane McMahon and Drew McIntyre held a celebration for Shane's victory over Roman Reigns, and McIntyre stated that he would destroy Reigns at Stomping Grounds.

=== SmackDown ===
On SmackDown, The New Day (WWE Champion Kofi Kingston, Big E, and Xavier Woods) defeated the team of Dolph Ziggler (now part of SmackDown), Kevin Owens, and Sami Zayn – Zayn appearing via the wildcard rule.

== Results ==
No.	Results	Stipulations	Times
1^{P}	The Usos (Jey Uso and Jimmy Uso) defeated The Revival (Scott Dawson and Dash Wilder) by pinfall	Tag team match	7:15
2	Seth Rollins (c) defeated Baron Corbin by pinfall	Singles match for the WWE Universal Championship	11:15
3	"The Demon" Finn Bálor (c) defeated Andrade by pinfall	Singles match for the WWE Intercontinental Championship	11:35
4	Shane McMahon defeated Roman Reigns by pinfall	Singles match	9:15
5	Lars Sullivan defeated Lucha House Party (Gran Metalik, Kalisto, and Lince Dorado) by disqualification	3-on-1 Handicap match	5:15
6	Randy Orton defeated Triple H by pinfall	Singles match	25:45
7	Braun Strowman defeated Bobby Lashley by pinfall	Singles match	8:20
8	Kofi Kingston (c) (with Xavier Woods) defeated Dolph Ziggler by pinfall	Singles match for the WWE Championship	10:15
9	Mansoor won by last eliminating Elias (Note: Other competitors by order of elimination: EC3, Sunil Singh, Samir Singh, Karl Anderson, Eric Young, Humberto Carrillo, Mike Kanellis, Luke Gallows, Heath Slater, Curtis Axel, Oney Lorcan, Akira Tozawa, Bo Dallas, No Way Jose, Mojo Rawley, The Brian Kendrick, Drew Gulak, Tony Nese, Tucker, Akam, Rezar, Ivar, Erik, Titus O'Neil, Buddy Murphy, Shelton Benjamin, Zack Ryder, Curt Hawkins, Chad Gable, Apollo Crews, Jinder Mahal, Otis, Xavier Woods, Rowan, Jey Uso, Jimmy Uso, Dash Wilder, Scott Dawson, Matt Hardy, Cedric Alexander, Shinsuke Nakamura, Sin Cara, Rusev, Robert Roode, The Miz, Samoa Joe, Ali, Ricochet, and Cesaro.)	51-Man Battle Royal	17:58
10	The Undertaker defeated Goldberg by pinfall	Singles match	9:35
(c) / – the champion(s) heading into the match; P / – the match was broadcast on the pre-show
