= Women's World Championship (WWE) =

Professional wrestling championship

- The current Women's World Championship belt with default side plates (2023–present)

Details
- Promotion: WWE
- Brand: Raw
- Date established: August 23, 2016
- Current champion: Liv Morgan
- Date won: October 10, 2026

Other names
- WWE SmackDown Women's Championship (2016–2023); Women's World Championship (2023–present)
Statistics
- First champion: Becky Lynch
- Most reigns: Charlotte Flair (7 reigns)
- Longest reign: 380 days (Note: Both of their respective reigns are recognized as lasting 379 days by WWE.): Bayley (2nd reign); Rhea Ripley (1st reign)
- Shortest reign: Charlotte Flair (4th reign, 4 minutes and 55 seconds)
- Oldest champion: Naomi (37 years, 225 days)
- Youngest champion: Alexa Bliss (25 years, 117 days)
- Heaviest champion: Rhea Ripley (170 lb (77 kg))
- Lightest champion: Alexa Bliss (102 lb (46 kg))

The Women's World Championship is a women's professional wrestling world championship created and promoted by the American promotion WWE, defended on the Raw brand division. It is one of two women's world titles for WWE's main roster, along with the WWE Women's Championship on SmackDown. The current champion is Liv Morgan, who is in her fourth reign. She won the title by defeating Stephanie Vaquer and Becky Lynch in a triple threat match at Money in the Bank on October 10, 2026.

Established as the SmackDown Women's Championship, it was unveiled on the August 23, 2016, episode of SmackDown as the counterpart to the WWE Women's Championship, which became exclusive to Raw as a result of the 2016 WWE Draft and renamed as Raw Women's Championship. The inaugural champion was Becky Lynch. As a result of the 2023 WWE Draft, the Raw and SmackDown women's championships switched brands, with the SmackDown Women's Championship subsequently renamed as the Women's World Championship, while the Raw title reverted to its original name of WWE Women's Championship. It is the fourth overall women's singles championship to be created by WWE, after the WWE Divas Championship, the NXT Women's Championship, and the current WWE Women's Championship.

The title has been contested in the main event of five WWE pay-per-view and livestreaming events: TLC: Tables, Ladders & Chairs in 2018 and, along with the Raw Women's Championship at the time, WWE's flagship event WrestleMania 35 in 2019, and by itself on Night 1 of WrestleMania 37 in 2021, Elimination Chamber in 2024, and Evolution in 2025. It was also the first women's professional wrestling championship to be defended in Saudi Arabia, which occurred at Super ShowDown in 2020.

== History ==
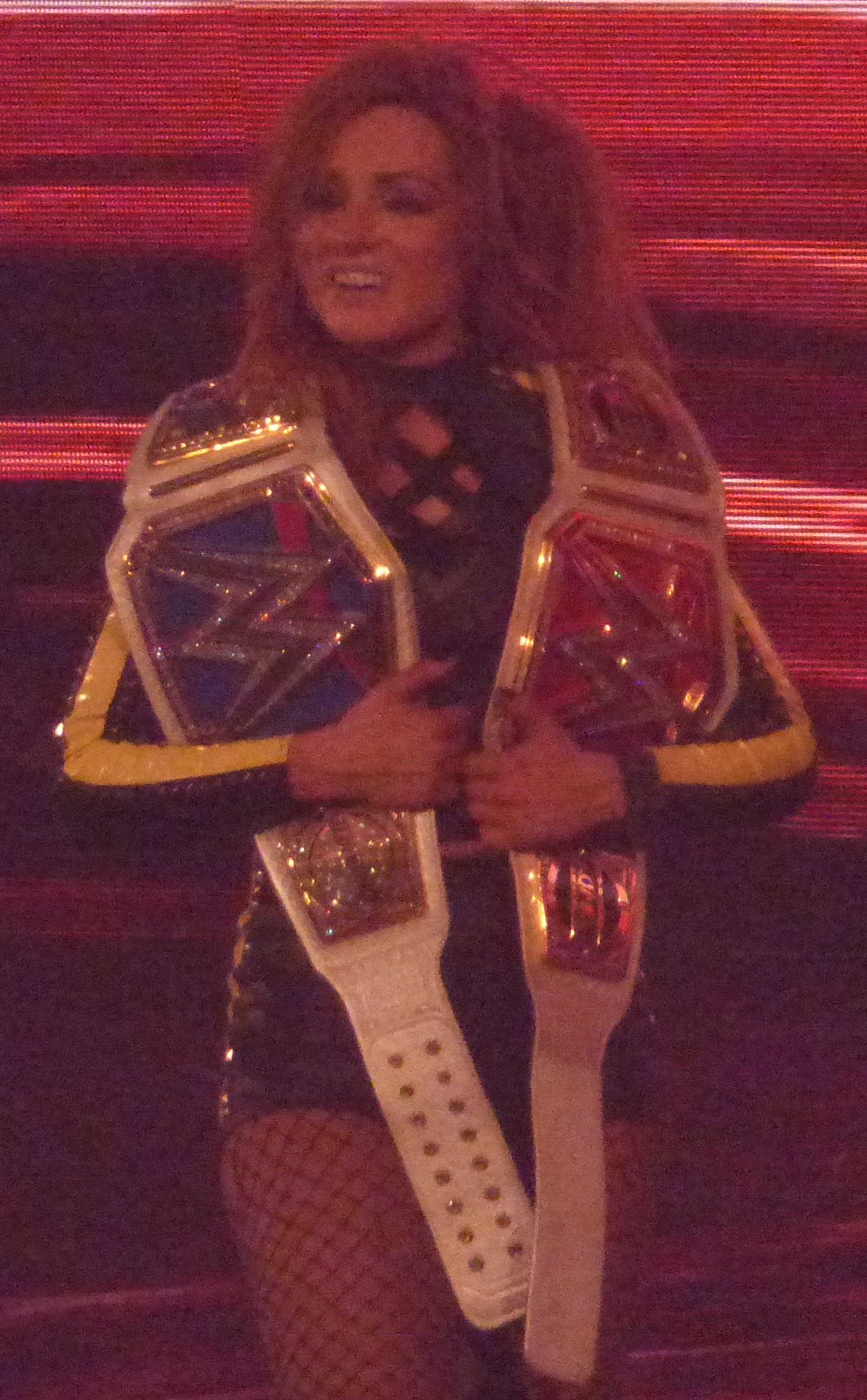
The inaugural and five-time champion Becky Lynch, shown here after winning the title for a third time when it was known as the SmackDown Women's Championship at WrestleMania 35, along with the then-Raw Women's Championship (right).

The Women's World Championship was originally established as the SmackDown Women's Championship on August 23, 2016. Its creation came as a result of the American professional wrestling promotion WWE reintroducing the brand extension, where the company again divided its roster between the Raw and SmackDown brands where wrestlers were exclusively assigned to perform; the first brand split ended in August 2011. During the 2016 draft, reigning WWE Women's Champion Charlotte was drafted to Raw, leaving SmackDown without a women's championship. Immediately following SummerSlam on the August 23, 2016, episode of SmackDown, SmackDown commissioner Shane McMahon and general manager Daniel Bryan unveiled the SmackDown Women's Championship (Raw's title was subsequently renamed as Raw Women's Championship).

A six-pack elimination challenge was then scheduled for Backlash on September 11, 2016, to determine the inaugural champion. The six women who competed at SummerSlam in the six-woman tag team match were chosen for the six-pack challenge: Alexa Bliss, Becky Lynch, Carmella, Naomi, Natalya, and Nikki Bella. Lynch became the inaugural champion when she last eliminated Carmella. The NXT Women's Championship would become WWE's third main women's title when NXT, the promotion's developmental brand, became recognized as WWE's third major brand in September 2019 when it was moved to the USA Network. However, this recognition was reversed when NXT reverted to being WWE's developmental brand in September 2021.

The title headlined a WWE pay-per-view and livestreaming event for the first time at TLC: Tables, Ladders & Chairs in December 2018, where Becky Lynch defended it in a triple threat Tables, Ladders, and Chairs match against Charlotte Flair and Asuka, which Asuka won; this was also the first women's TLC triple threat match. The title was then on the line in a winner takes all triple threat match in the main event of WrestleMania 35 in April 2019, where Flair defended the title against Raw Women's Champion Ronda Rousey and Lynch, who won the match. This was the first women's match to main event a WrestleMania – WWE's flagship event. At Super ShowDown in February 2020, the title became the first women's championship to be defended in Saudi Arabia, where Bayley retained the title over Naomi; this was only the second women's match contested in the country. The title would again be on the line in the main event of a WrestleMania, this time of Night 1 of WrestleMania 37 in April 2021 where Bianca Belair defeated Sasha Banks to win the title; this was also the first time that two African-Americans headlined a WrestleMania and only the second women's match to main event the annual show.

As a result of the 2023 WWE Draft, the Raw and SmackDown women's championships switched brands and there were no title changes for either championship before draft results went into effect on May 8. The issue of the SmackDown Women's Championship being on Raw was then resolved on the June 12, 2023, episode of Raw. That night, WWE official Adam Pearce unveiled a new championship belt to reigning champion Rhea Ripley, with the title subsequently renamed as the Women's World Championship. This came shortly after the Raw Women's Championship reverted to its original name of WWE Women's Championship on June 9.

The title changed hands for the first time at a non-televised house show on September 12, 2026. During the WWE Live: South America Live Tour in Santiago, Chile, Stephanie Vaquer defeated Liv Morgan to win the title for a second time, which had Becky Lynch as the special guest referee.

=== Inaugural championship match ===
Eliminated	Wrestler	Eliminated by	Method of elimination	Times
1	Alexa Bliss	Naomi	Pinfall	9:38
2	Naomi	Natalya	Submission	10:52
3	Natalya	Nikki Bella	Pinfall	12:50
4	Nikki Bella	Carmella	Pinfall	12:58
5	Carmella	Becky Lynch	Submission	14:40
Winner	Becky Lynch			14:40

== Brand designation history ==
The championship was established to be exclusive to its namesake brand, SmackDown. An incident occurred in the 2021 WWE Draft where both the Raw and SmackDown women's champions were drafted to the opposite brands. To keep the titles on their respective brands, the champions swapped titles. However, this same incident occurred in the 2023 draft, but the champions instead kept their titles, thus the titles changed brands despite their namesakes. This issue would be resolved as the titles were subsequently renamed to remove the brands.

Date of transition	Brand	Notes
August 23, 2016	SmackDown	The championship was established for SmackDown after WWE Women's Champion Charlotte was drafted to Raw in the 2016 WWE Draft, with Charlotte's title renamed to Raw Women's Championship.; Becky Lynch subsequently became the inaugural SmackDown Women's Champion at Backlash on September 11, 2016.
May 8, 2023	Raw	SmackDown Women's Champion Rhea Ripley was drafted to Raw in the 2023 WWE Draft.; The title was renamed as the Women's World Championship on June 12, 2023.

== Championship belt designs ==
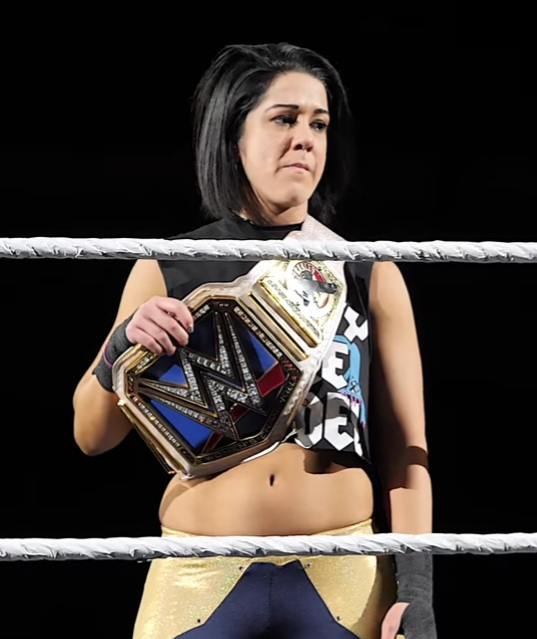
Bayley with the original version of the championship belt when it was called the SmackDown Women's Championship (2016–2023)

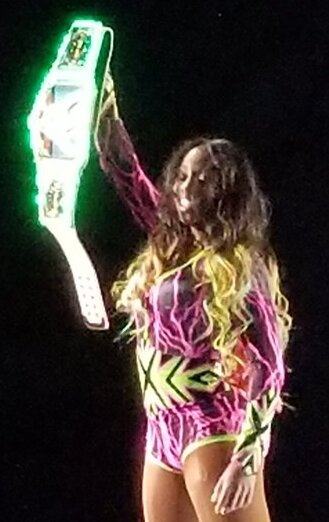
Three-time champion Naomi with her custom glowing SmackDown Women's Championship belt during her second reign in 2017.

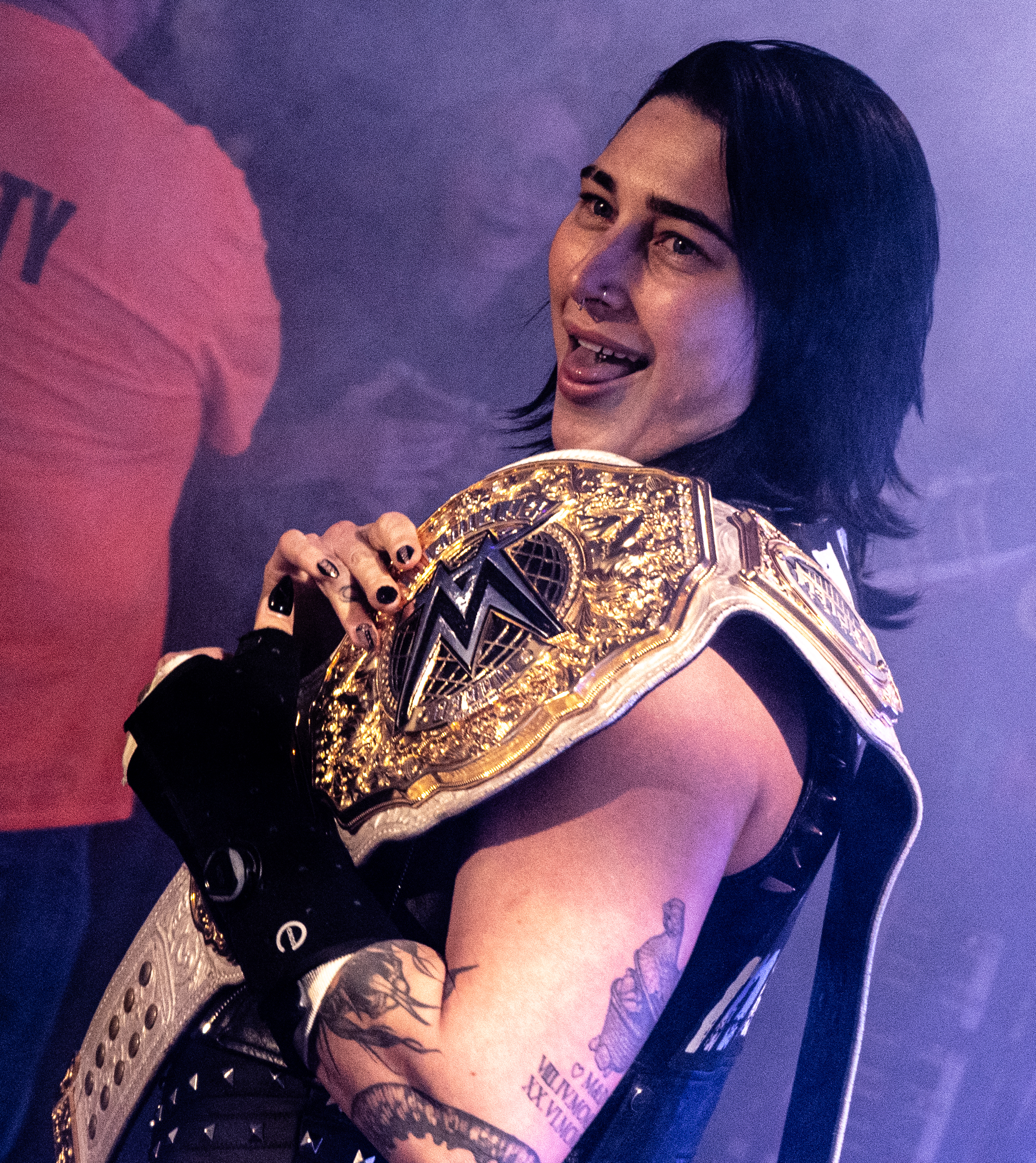
Rhea Ripley with the second and current design of the belt after it was renamed to the Women's World Championship (2023–present).

As the SmackDown Women's Championship, the title was represented by a belt using the same "Network Logo" design as the WWE Women's Championship, with the only difference being that the background of the center plate and the default side plates' globes were blue (as opposed to red) to symbolize its exclusivity to SmackDown. In what has become a prominent feature on all of WWE's championship belts, the side plates could be customized with the reigning champion's logo.

When the title was renamed the Women's World Championship in June 2023, it adopted a near-identical design to the men's World Heavyweight Championship that had been introduced in April, albeit smaller, on a white strap, and with a small banner above the "World" banner that says "Women's". It also retains the customizable side plates.

=== Custom designs ===
During Naomi's second reign with the SmackDown Women's Championship belt in 2017, strips of multi interchanging colored LED lights were placed around the outline of the WWE logo and the outline of the belt to go with her "glow" gimmick. During Naomi's third reign in 2025, she customized the Women's World Championship belt with caution tape around the strap to match her newer character and ring gear that featured caution tape. However, this would be a short-lived custom design as she soon after had to vacate the title due to her pregnancy.

== Reigns ==
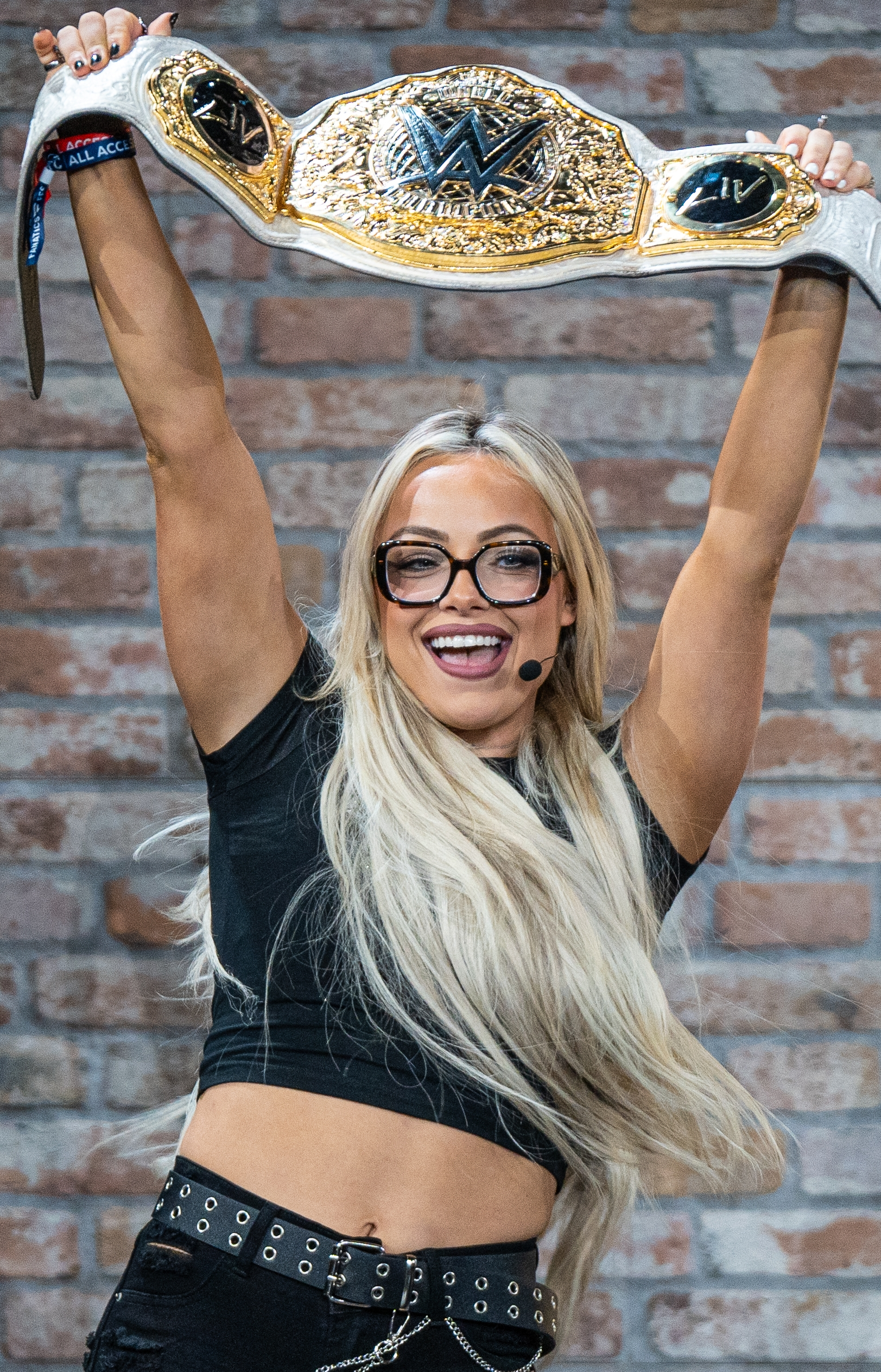
Current and four-time champion Liv Morgan

As of November 12, 2026, there have been 35 reigns between 15 champions and 3 vacancies. Becky Lynch was the inaugural champion. Charlotte Flair has the most reigns at seven. Bayley's second reign and Rhea Ripley's first reign are tied for the longest singular reign at 380 days (379 days for both as recognized by WWE), while Flair's fourth reign is the shortest at 4 minutes and 55 seconds. Bayley has the longest combined reign across her two reigns at 520 days (519 days as recognized by WWE). Naomi is the oldest champion, having won the title at 37 years, 225 days old, while Alexa Bliss is the youngest when she won it at 25. Only two women have held the title for a continuous reign of one year (365 days) or more: Bayley and Rhea Ripley.

Liv Morgan is the current champion in her fourth reign. She won the title by defeating Stephanie Vaquer and Becky Lynch in a triple threat match at Money in the Bank on October 10, 2026.

== Notes ==
Sporting positions
Preceded by WWE Divas Championship	WWE's top women's championship 2016–present	Succeeded by Current
