= Elimination Chamber (2024) =

WWE premium live event

- Promotional poster featuring Rhea Ripley inside the Elimination Chamber Structure
- Promotion: WWE
- Brand(s): Raw; SmackDown
- Date: February 24, 2024
- City: Perth, Western Australia, Australia
- Venue: Perth Stadium
- Attendance: 52,590

WWE event chronology
← Previous; NXT Vengeance Day	Next → NXT Stand & Deliver

Elimination Chamber chronology
← Previous; 2023	Next → 2025

WWE in Australia chronology
← Previous; Super Show-Down	Next → Crown Jewel

The 2024 Elimination Chamber, also promoted as Elimination Chamber: Perth (known as No Escape: Perth in Germany), was a professional wrestling premium live event (PLE) produced by the American company WWE, held for wrestlers from the promotion's main roster brands, Raw and SmackDown. It was the 14th Elimination Chamber event and took place on Saturday, February 24, 2024, at Perth Stadium in Perth, Western Australia, Australia, airing live at 8:00 p.m. Australian Eastern Time (5:00 a.m. Eastern Time). The event centered on the Elimination Chamber match, a type of roofed steel cage that surrounds the ring and ringside area with no disqualifications; the objective is to eliminate all other opponents either by pinfall or submission with championship implications at stake.

Five matches were contested at the event, including one on the Elimination Chamber: Perth Kickoff pre-show; this was WWE's final PLE to title its pre-show as "Kickoff" as they were renamed to "Countdown" beginning with NXT Stand & Deliver in April. The main event was between two Australian natives where Rhea Ripley defeated Nia Jax to retain Raw's Women's World Championship, which was the first time women main-evented a main roster PLE since WrestleMania 37 in April 2021. For the event's Elimination Chamber matches, there was one each for the men and women with wrestlers from both brands in each, and beginning with this event, these matches determine the WrestleMania challengers for the world championships that the previous month's Royal Rumble match winners did not choose. As a result of both 2024 Royal Rumble winners choosing to challenge for SmackDown's world championships at WrestleMania XL, both Elimination Chamber matches determined the challengers for Raw's world championships at the event. Drew McIntyre and Becky Lynch, both from Raw, won the respective men's and women's matches, the latter of which opened the show, to earn a match for the World Heavyweight Championship and Women's World Championship, respectively, at WrestleMania XL.

This was WWE's first PLE to be held in Australia since Super Show-Down in October 2018, and the company's only event in the Asia–Pacific region in 2024. This was also the third consecutive Elimination Chamber to be held outside of the United States as well as the first to take place in an outdoor venue. This was also the first Elimination Chamber to livestream on Abema in Japan and the final Elimination Chamber to air on Disney+ Hotstar in Indonesia, Binge in Australia, and the standalone WWE Network in most other international markets, as WWE's content in those areas moved to Netflix in January 2025.

== Production ==
=== Background ===
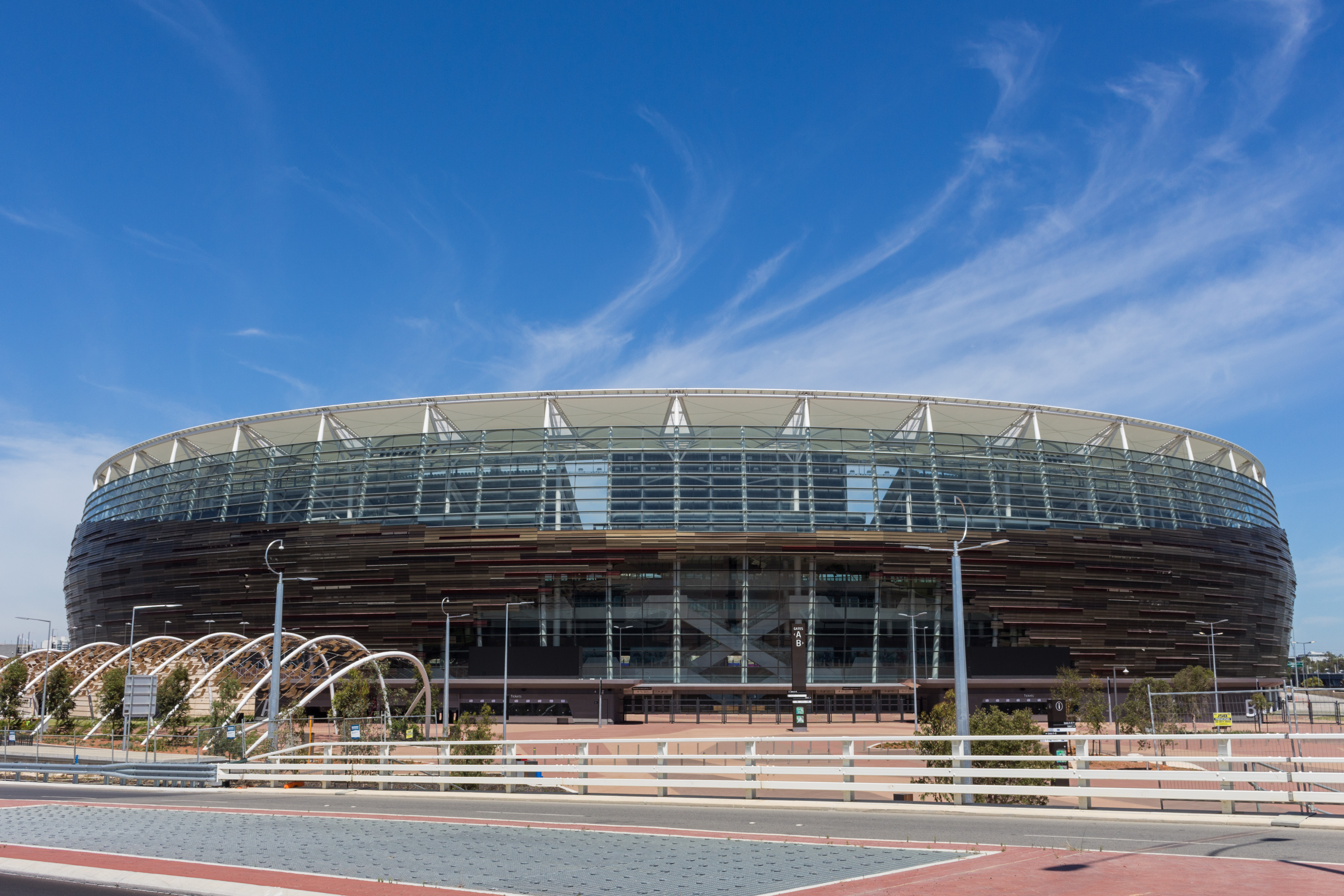
The 14th Elimination Chamber event was held at the Perth Stadium in Perth, Western Australia, Australia, marking WWE's only premium live event in the Asia–Pacific region in 2024.

Elimination Chamber is a professional wrestling premium live event (PLE) first produced by the American promotion WWE in 2010. It has been held every year since, except in 2016, generally in February. The event was originally broadcast exclusively via traditional pay-per-view (PPV) before it began simulcasting on WWE's livestreaming platforms in 2015. The concept of the event is that one or two main event matches are contested inside the Elimination Chamber, either with championships or future opportunities at championships at stake.

Announced on September 21, 2023, the 14th Elimination Chamber event was scheduled to take place on Saturday, February 24, 2024, at Perth Stadium in Perth, Western Australia, Australia, and featured wrestlers from the Raw and SmackDown brand divisions, with the event promoted as Elimination Chamber: Perth. This marked the first Elimination Chamber event to be held in Australia, and the third to be held outside of the United States, after the 2022 and 2023 events, which were held in Saudi Arabia and Canada, respectively. This also marked WWE's first PLE to be held in Australia since Super Show-Down in October 2018, and the only PLE in the Asia–Pacific region in 2024. This was also the first Elimination Chamber event to have a subtitle named after its host city and to take place in an outdoor venue. Tickets went on sale on November 10, 2023.

The Elimination Chamber match is an elimination-based match contested in a type of large roofed steel cage that surrounds the wrestling ring with an elevated platform around the ring. Within the Chamber are four inner pods, one behind each ring post. The match is contested by six participants. Two wrestlers start the match, while the other four are held within each inner pod with one selected randomly to enter the match at regular intervals, which continues until all four have been released. The objective is to eliminate all other opponents by pinfall or submission, and there are no disqualifications or count-outs.

In 2011 and since 2013, the event has been promoted as "No Escape" in Germany as it was feared that the name "Elimination Chamber" may remind people of the gas chambers used during the Holocaust; it was promoted as "No Way Out" in 2010 and 2012.

=== Broadcast outlets ===
The PLE was broadcast on traditional PPV outlets worldwide. It was also available to livestream on Peacock in the United States, SonyLIV in India, Disney+ Hotstar in Indonesia, Disney+ in the Philippines, Binge in Australia, Abema in Japan, and the WWE Network everywhere else. This was the first Elimination Chamber to livestream on Abema after the Japanese version of the WWE Network merged under Abema in October 2023. With the event being held in Perth, Australia, it aired live at 8:00 p.m. Australian Eastern Time (5:00 a.m. Eastern Time).

Following an announcement made on January 23, this was the final Elimination Chamber to air on the standalone WWE Network in most international markets where it was still available, as well as Disney+ Hotstar and Binge, as its content moved to Netflix in January 2025; a select few territories maintained the standalone WWE Network until early 2026 due to pre-existing contracts before they also merged under Netflix when those contracts expired.

=== Storylines ===
The event comprised five matches, including one on the pre-show, that resulted from scripted storylines. Results were predetermined by WWE's writers on the Raw and SmackDown brands, while storylines were produced on WWE's weekly television shows, Monday Night Raw and Friday Night SmackDown.

On the February 2 episode of SmackDown, the Undisputed WWE Tag Team Championship Contender Series began, featuring two fatal four-way tag team matches, one for SmackDown and one for Raw, with the winning teams then facing off to determine who would challenge reigning champions The Judgment Day (Finn Bálor and Damian Priest) for the titles at Elimination Chamber. Pete Dunne and Tyler Bate won the SmackDown bracket that night, while on the following episode of Raw, #DIY (Johnny Gargano and Tommaso Ciampa) won the Raw bracket. On that week's SmackDown, Dunne and Bate defeated #DIY to face Bálor and Priest for the Undisputed WWE Tag Team Championship at Elimination Chamber. Dunne and Bate subsequently took on the team name of New Catch Republic.

On February 5, Raw General Manager Adam Pearce announced that due to the women's Royal Rumble match winner choosing to challenge for SmackDown's WWE Women's Championship at WrestleMania XL, the challenger for Raw's Women's World Championship at WrestleMania would be determined by an Elimination Chamber match, featuring three women from Raw and SmackDown each. The first qualifying match took place on that night's Raw, where Becky Lynch defeated Shayna Baszler. Bianca Belair then defeated Michin on the February 9 episode of SmackDown. The next qualifier took place on the February 12 episode of Raw, where Liv Morgan defeated Zoey Stark. The fourth and fifth qualifying matches took place on the February 16 episode of SmackDown where Tiffany Stratton and Naomi defeated Zelina Vega and Alba Fyre, (Note: Shotzi was originally supposed to face Stratton, with Vega facing Naomi, however, Shotzi suffered a legitimate knee injury during a match on the February 13 taping of NXT (aired February 20). On February 14, the matchups were changed with Fyre announced as Shotzi's replacement.) respectively. The last spot was determined by a Last Chance battle royal on the February 19 episode of Raw, which was won by a returning Raquel Rodriguez by last eliminating Chelsea Green.

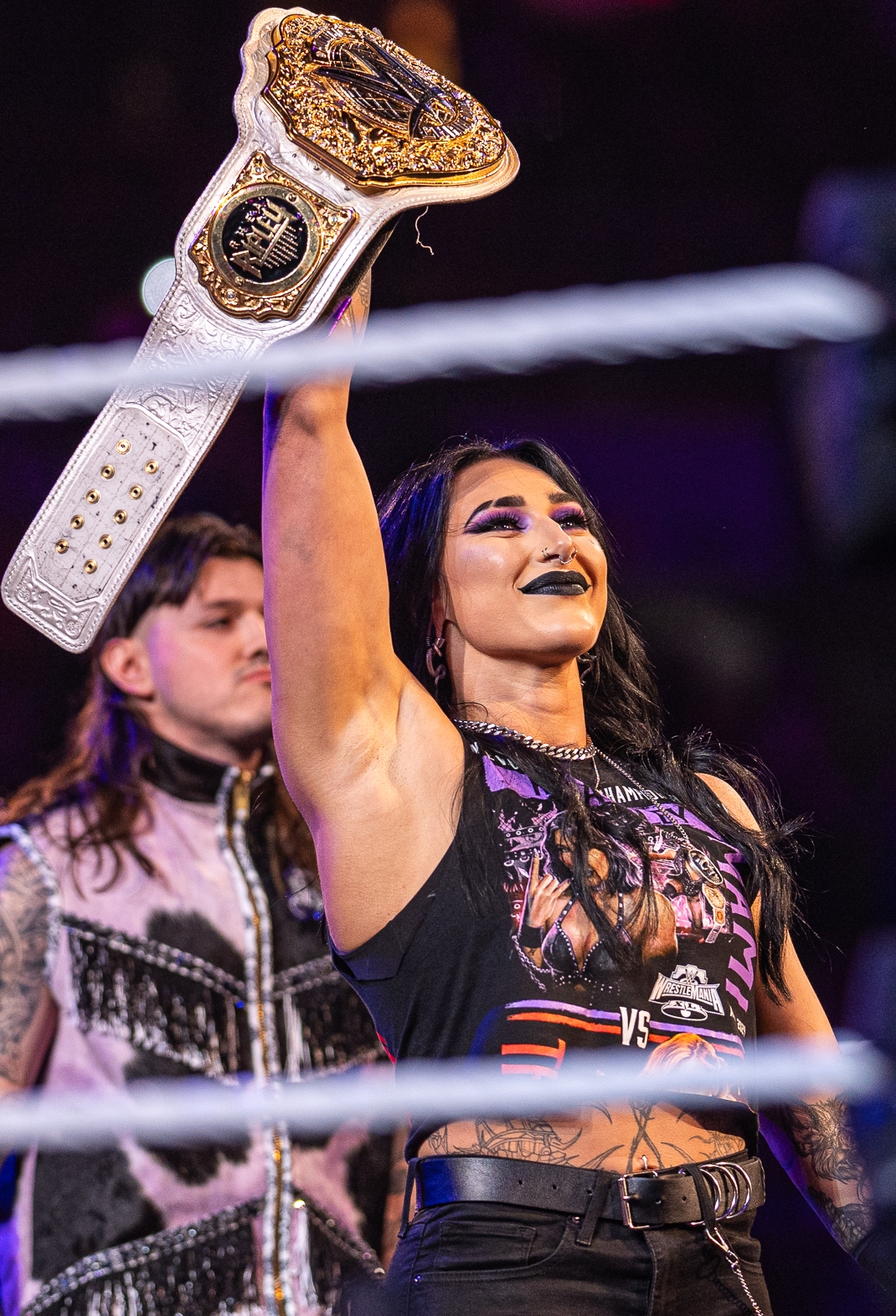
Australia native Rhea Ripley defended Raw's Women's World Championship in the main event against fellow Australian Nia Jax.

On the September 11, 2023, episode of Raw, Nia Jax made a surprise return to WWE and helped Rhea Ripley retain the Women's World Championship, only to attack Ripley after the match. At Crown Jewel on November 4, Ripley retained the title in a fatal five-way match, also involving Jax. Since then, Jax continued to target Ripley, vowing to win the 2024 Royal Rumble match to face Ripley at WrestleMania XL, but failed. On the next episode of Raw, Jax viciously attacked Ripley and said she would not make it to WrestleMania. On the February 5 episode, Ripley called out Jax, however, Raw General Manager Adam Pearce appeared, trying to prevent a brawl between the two, and announced that Ripley would defend the Women's World Championship against Jax at Elimination Chamber. Despite this, a brawl still occurred.

On the February 9 episode of SmackDown, SmackDown General Manager Nick Aldis and Raw General Manager Adam Pearce announced that due to the men's Royal Rumble match winner choosing to challenge for SmackDown's Undisputed WWE Universal Championship at WrestleMania XL, Seth "Freakin" Rollins's challenger for Raw's World Heavyweight Championship at WrestleMania would be determined by an Elimination Chamber match, featuring three men from Raw and SmackDown each. The first qualifying matches took place on that same episode, with Drew McIntyre and Randy Orton defeating AJ Styles and Sami Zayn, respectively. The next qualifiers took place on the February 12 episode of Raw, with Bobby Lashley and LA Knight defeating Bronson Reed and Ivar, respectively. The last two qualifiers took place on the February 16 episode of SmackDown, where Kevin Owens and Logan Paul defeated "Dirty" Dominik Mysterio and The Miz, respectively.

During the February 14 episode of The Bump, SmackDown and Australian wrestler Grayson Waller announced that he would be hosting a special edition of his talk show, "The Grayson Waller Effect", at Elimination Chamber, with special guests from Raw, 2024 Royal Rumble winner Cody Rhodes and World Heavyweight Champion Seth "Freakin" Rollins.

During the Elimination Chamber press conference on February 22, it was announced that The Kabuki Warriors (Asuka and Kairi Sane) would defend the WWE Women's Tag Team Championship against Candice LeRae and Indi Hartwell on the Kickoff pre-show.

==== Cancelled matches ====
Brock Lesnar, who last appeared at SummerSlam in August 2023, was planned to have made his return at the Royal Rumble in the men's Royal Rumble match. It was also planned that he would have been eliminated by "Dirty" Dominik Mysterio to set up a match between the two at Elimination Chamber. However, due to Lesnar being referenced in a sex trafficking lawsuit against Vince McMahon, Lesnar was pulled from the Royal Rumble and all planned storylines for him leading into WrestleMania XL were scrapped.

Australia native Bronson Reed was also originally planned to be involved at Elimination Chamber. It was reported that Reed was originally supposed to challenge Seth "Freakin" Rollins for the World Heavyweight Championship, however, due to Rollins's injury, plans were changed. Reed ultimately would not participate at all as his wife gave birth to their son early.

== Event ==
Other on-screen personnel
Role:	Name:
English commentators	Michael Cole
English commentators	Corey Graves
Spanish commentators	Marcelo Rodriguez
Spanish commentators	Jerry Soto
Ring announcer	Mike Rome
Referees	Danilo Anfibio
Referees	Jessika Carr
Referees	Dan Engler
Referees	Daphanie LaShaunn
Referees	Eddie Orengo
Referees	Chad Patton
Referees	Ryan Tran
Interviewer	Byron Saxton
Pre-show panel	Megan Morant
Pre-show panel	Peter Rosenberg
Pre-show panel	Sam Roberts

Early storms in Perth, which caused the Rottnest Channel Swim to be abandoned, created some concerns about its potential impact on the Elimination Chamber event going ahead. The weather cleared as day progressed with 52,590 fans attending the event in person.

=== Pre-show ===
There was one match that occurred on the Elimination Chamber: Perth Kickoff pre-show in which The Kabuki Warriors (Asuka and Kairi Sane) defended the WWE Women's Tag Team Championship against Candice LeRae and Australia native Indi Hartwell. The Kabuki Warriors retained after Sane performed an Insane Elbow on LeRae for the pin.

=== Preliminary matches ===
The actual PLE opened with the Women's Elimination Chamber match for a Women's World Championship match at WrestleMania XL. Becky Lynch and Naomi started the match. Tiffany Stratton exited the pod first, followed by Liv Morgan, Raquel Rodriguez, and Bianca Belair. Naomi hit a Sunset Flip Powerbomb on Morgan, but Stratton rolled up Naomi in a pin for the elimination. Stratton hit a Swanton Bomb off the top of a pod onto everyone. Stratton was then eliminated by Morgan after Morgan performed the Oblivion and pinned Stratton. Lynch locked Rodriguez in the Dis-Arm-Her and then Armbar submission holds, but Belair eliminated Rodriguez after performing the KOD and pinning her. Morgan delivered a Superplex on Lynch, who got her knees up on Belair's 450 Splash. Belair attempted a KOD on Lynch, who landed on her feet. Morgan eliminated Belair with a rollup pin and then Lynch hit the Manhandle Slam on Morgan and pinned her to win and earn a match for the Women's World Championship at WrestleMania.

Next, The Judgment Day (Finn Bálor and Damian Priest, accompanied by "Dirty" Dominik Mysterio) defended the Undisputed WWE Tag Team Championship against New Catch Republic (Pete Dunne and Tyler Bate). Bate hit a Tope Con Hilo through the ropes on Priest, but Mysterio pulled Priest's foot under the rope, which resulted in the referee ejecting Mysterio from ringside. Dunne and Bate hit a Double Tyler Driver '97 and a Double Birminghammer on Bálor for a nearfall. In the end, Priest hit a Double South of Heaven Chokeslam on both and then Bálor performed the Coup de Grâce on Dunne to retain.

After that, in his home country, Grayson Waller (along with Austin Theory) hosted "The Grayson Waller Effect" with guests, 2024 men's Royal Rumble winner Cody Rhodes and World Heavyweight Champion Seth "Freakin" Rollins. Before the segment began, Waller shared a shoey with Australian mixed martial artist, Tai Tuivasa of the Ultimate Fighting Championship, who was in the front row. During the segment, Rollins announced that he was almost medically cleared to return to in-ring action. In a further build to WrestleMania XL, Rhodes issued a challenge to The Rock, in which Rollins affirmed that Rhodes would not be alone in facing The Bloodline (Rock, Roman Reigns, Jimmy Uso, and Solo Sikoa). Theory then taunted both with Rock's catchphrases, which resulted in Rhodes attacking Theory with the Cody Cutter followed by Rollins performing The Stomp.

The penultimate match was the Men's Elimination Chamber match for a World Heavyweight Championship match at WrestleMania XL. Drew McIntyre and LA Knight started the match. Kevin Owens exited the pod first, followed by Bobby Lashley, Randy Orton, and Logan Paul. Lashley put Paul through a chamber pod with a spear. McIntyre hit Lashley twice with the Claymore Kick and pinned him for the elimination. Knight delivered Blunt Force Trauma on Orton and McIntyre. AJ Styles, who entered the open chamber door when Lashley was exiting, attacked Knight with a steel chair, allowing McIntyre to pin Knight for the elimination. McIntyre attempted a Claymore on Owens, who countered it with the Pop-Up Powerbomb. Owens missed the Pop-Up and the Stunner on Orton, who eliminated Owens with a pin after performing an RKO. Paul put on brass knuckles, but spent too much time gloating and Orton hit an RKO on Paul and pinned him for the elimination. McIntyre attempted a Claymore on Orton, but Orton collapsed from his injured back. Orton suckered McIntyre in and performed the RKO, but Paul, who had not yet exited the chamber after his elimination, hit Orton with One Lucky Punch while wearing the brass knuckles, allowing McIntyre to pin Orton and win to earn a match for the World Heavyweight Championship at WrestleMania.

=== Main event ===
In the main event, Australia native Rhea Ripley defended the Women's World Championship against fellow Australian, Nia Jax. Jax dominated most of the match. Jax hit a Samoan Drop to Ripley off the middle rope for a nearfall. Jax hit another Samoan Drop to Ripley on the announce table and drove her through the table with an Elbow Drop. Jax hit The Annihilator on Ripley for a nearfall. In the climax, Ripley hit a Superplex and the Riptide on Jax to retain the title. Afterwards, Ripley celebrated with her family, who were seated front row.

== Aftermath ==
Due to the success of Elimination Chamber: Perth, on February 28, 2025, WWE announced a return to Perth for a future PLE, as well as tapings of Raw and SmackDown. This would be confirmed as the 2025 Crown Jewel, scheduled for October 11, with SmackDown on October 10 and Raw on October 13. This would also be WWE's final PLE to title the pre-show as "Kickoff" as they were renamed to "Countdown" beginning with NXT Stand & Deliver in April.

=== Raw ===
The following episode of Raw opened with Women's World Champion, Rhea Ripley (accompanied by Judgment Day stablemate, "Dirty" Dominik Mysterio), talking about her victory against Nia Jax and that no matter who she faced for the title, she will always come on top. Becky Lynch, who won the women's Elimination Chamber match, came out and congratulated her for her victory against Jax and warned her she would beat her for the title at WrestleMania XL. Ripley responded by saying she is the backbone of the women's division and suggest that Lynch should win something to get to her level. The two superstars briefly entered into a heated argument before Lynch was attacked by Jax. In retaliation, Lynch attacked Jax during her match with Liv Morgan, which resulted in a match between them on the following Raw, but ended in a no-contest as Morgan interfered in their match. On the March 11 episode, following Lynch's win over Morgan, Jax slammed Lynch through a table backstage. The rivalry would end on the March 18 episode, which saw Lynch defeat Jax in a Last Woman Standing match.

Following their retention of the Undisputed Tag Team Championships against New Catch Republic (Tyler Bate and Pete Dunne), The Judgment Day (Damian Priest, Finn Bálor, Mysterio, and JD McDonagh) confronted Imperium (Gunther, Ludwig Kaiser, and Giovanni Vinci) about Gunther's Intercontinental Championship, stating that they want to add more gold in their faction. When Gunther asked which member of The Judgment Day would challenge him for the title, Mysterio instinctively stepped up, prompting Gunther to laugh and push him away. A match between Mysterio and Gunther was scheduled for the following week, which was won by Gunther. The following week, McDonagh would compete in a gauntlet match for an Intercontinental Championship match at WrestleMania XL in a losing effort.

Drew McIntyre, who won the men's Elimination Chamber match, came out and thanked all the fans for believing in him and talked about how it wasn't easy to come out victorious. He proceeded to taunt CM Punk on not being able to compete in the Road to WrestleMania following his injury during the Royal Rumble match. When he finished taunting Punk, he called out World Heavyweight Champion, Seth "Freakin" Rollins, to confront him about his involvement in The Bloodline story. He question Rollins' on why he would want to help Cody Rhodes against The Bloodline and pleaded with him to back off so that he could face Rollins at WrestleMania XL in full condition. Rollins responded by telling him there are bigger things to worry about than just the two of them. He further highlighted that some risks are worth taking and that taking out The Bloodline was important for they would secure the future of the industry before leaving the ring.

During the final segment, following his victory against Grayson Waller, Cody Rhodes was approached by Paul Heyman (who was flanked with three security guards). Heyman pleaded with him to withdraw his challenge against The Rock for there would be dire consequences if he didn't co-operate. However, Rhodes wasn't fazed, forcing Heyman and his guards to enter the ring. Rhodes, however, fended off the guards and exclaimed that he's going after The Bloodline if that's what it takes to finish his story.

=== SmackDown ===
On the following episode of SmackDown, The Rock rejected Cody Rhodes's challenge and instead challenged Rhodes and Seth "Freakin" Rollins to a tag team match against himself and Roman Reigns in the main event of WrestleMania XL Night 1. Additionally, the stipulation would be that if Rhodes and Rollins won, then The Bloodline would be barred from ringside during Rhodes's match against Reigns for the Undisputed WWE Universal Championship on Night 2; however, if Rock and Reigns won, then the championship match would be contested under The Bloodline's rules in which anything goes. The challenge was accepted the following week.

Following more weeks of feuding, AJ Styles and LA Knight were scheduled for a match at WrestleMania XL.

== Results ==
No.	Results	Stipulations	Times
1^{P}	The Kabuki Warriors (Asuka and Kairi Sane) (c) defeated Candice LeRae and Indi Hartwell by pinfall	Tag team match for the WWE Women's Tag Team Championship	8:55
2	Becky Lynch defeated Bianca Belair, Liv Morgan, Naomi, Raquel Rodriguez, and Tiffany Stratton	Elimination Chamber match for a Women's World Championship match at WrestleMania XL	32:15
3	The Judgment Day (Finn Bálor and Damian Priest) (c) (with "Dirty" Dominik Mysterio) defeated New Catch Republic (Pete Dunne and Tyler Bate) by pinfall	Tag team match for the Undisputed WWE Tag Team Championship (Note: The name "Undisputed WWE Tag Team Championship" referred to both the Raw Tag Team Championship and SmackDown Tag Team Championship being held and defended together, although both titles remained independently active.)	17:25
4	Drew McIntyre defeated Bobby Lashley, Kevin Owens, LA Knight, Logan Paul, and Randy Orton	Elimination Chamber match for a World Heavyweight Championship match at WrestleMania XL	36:55
5	Rhea Ripley (c) defeated Nia Jax by pinfall	Singles match for the Women's World Championship	14:35
(c) / – the champion(s) heading into the match; P / – the match was broadcast on the pre-show

=== Women's Elimination Chamber match ===
Eliminated	Wrestler	Entered	Eliminated by	Method	Time
1	Naomi	1	Tiffany Stratton	Pinfall	13:30
2	Tiffany Stratton	3	Liv Morgan	Pinfall	22:55
3	Raquel Rodriguez	5	Bianca Belair	Pinfall	25:05
4	Bianca Belair	6	Liv Morgan	Pinfall	32:10
5	Liv Morgan	4	Becky Lynch	Pinfall	32:15
Winner	Becky Lynch	2			32:15

=== Men's Elimination Chamber match ===
Eliminated	Wrestler	Entered	Eliminated by	Method	Time
1	Bobby Lashley	4	Drew McIntyre	Pinfall	21:30
2	LA Knight	2	Drew McIntyre	Pinfall	24:20
3	Kevin Owens	3	Randy Orton	Pinfall	28:00
4	Logan Paul	6	Randy Orton	Pinfall	32:35
5	Randy Orton	5	Drew McIntyre	Pinfall	36:55
Winner	Drew McIntyre	1			36:55

=== Undisputed WWE Tag Team Championship Contender Series ===
Semifinals; SmackDown; February 2, 2024; Raw; February 5, 2024
SmackDown
New Catch Republic (Pete Dunne and Tyler Bate)	Pinfall
Pretty Deadly (Kit Wilson and Elton Prince)	9:26
Latino World Order (Cruz Del Toro and Joaquin Wilde)	—
Legado Del Fantasma (Angel and Humberto)	—
Raw
#DIY (Johnny Gargano and Tommaso Ciampa)	Pinfall
The Creed Brothers (Brutus Creed and Julius Creed)	—
Imperium (Giovanni Vinci and Ludwig Kaiser)	17:30
The New Day (Kofi Kingston and Xavier Woods)	—

Final; SmackDown; February 9, 2024
New Catch Republic	Pinfall
#DIY	8:40
