= NXT Deadline =

WWE premium live event series

- WWE Deadline logo used in 2024
- Promotion: WWE
- Brand: NXT
- First event: 2022
- Last event: 2025
- Signature match: Iron Survivor Challenge

NXT Deadline (stylized as DEADL1NE) was a professional wrestling premium live event (PLE) produced by WWE, a Connecticut-based professional wrestling promotion. Established in 2022, it was held annually in December for the promotion's developmental brand, NXT, until 2025. The event was based around the Iron Survivor Challenge for men and women, a 25-minute five-person match in which a wrestler attempted to score the most falls before the "deadline" in order to win and earn a match for the NXT Championship and NXT Women's Championship, respectively.

The Iron Survivor Challenge debuted at the inaugural event. Deadline had also replaced NXT WarGames as the brand's December event. After four years, however, Deadline itself was replaced by TLC: Tables, Ladders & Chairs, which was reinstated as an NXT PLE in 2026.

== History ==
On October 15, 2022, the American professional wrestling promotion WWE filed to trademark the name "NXT Deadline" for its developmental brand, NXT. It was then confirmed that NXT's premium live event (PLE) on December 10 that year would be Deadline, and it aired on Peacock in the United States and the WWE Network in most other international markets. The event debuted the Iron Survivor Challenge match-type in WWE, with one each for the men and women. Deadline replaced NXT WarGames as the brand's December event, after the WarGames concept was moved to the main roster for the 2022 Survivor Series for the Raw and SmackDown main roster brands.

On September 28, 2023, WWE announced the return of Deadline, thus establishing Deadline as NXT's annual December event. The 2024 event was notably WWE's final PLE to air on the WWE Network in most international markets as its content moved to Netflix in January 2025.

On October 31, 2026, during Halloween Havoc, WWE announced the return of TLC: Tables, Ladders & Chairs as an NXT PLE set for December 12. As a result, Deadline was not held in 2026, and while it is unknown if the event will in the future, it was reported that there had been internal discussion to bring the Iron Survivor Challenge to the main roster.

== Iron Survivor Challenge ==
The Iron Survivor Challenge is a 25-minute match that features five wrestlers. Two wrestlers start the match, and every five minutes, another wrestler enters with the fifth and final participant entering at the 15-minute mark. The objective is to earn the most points before the time expires (the "deadline"). Points are earned by scoring a pinfall, submission, or being the victim of a disqualification. A wrestler who is pinned, submitted, or disqualified goes into a penalty box for 90 seconds. The wrestler with the most points when the time expires is deemed the winner, and in the result of a tie, those who are tied enter sudden death overtime. The winners of the men's and women's matches are dubbed the Iron Survivors and receive a future match for the NXT Championship and NXT Women's Championship, respectively.

== Events and Iron Survivor winners ==
#	Event	Date	City	Venue	Main event	Iron Survivor				Ref.
#	Event	Date	City	Venue	Main event	Men's	No.	Women's	No.	Ref.
1	NXT Deadline (2022)	December 10, 2022	Orlando, Florida	WWE Performance Center	Bron Breakker (c) vs. Apollo Crews for the NXT Championship	Grayson Waller	4	Roxanne Perez	1	
2	NXT Deadline (2023)	December 9, 2023	Bridgeport, Connecticut	Total Mortgage Arena	Ilja Dragunov (c) vs. Baron Corbin for the NXT Championship	Trick Williams	4	Blair Davenport	2	
3	NXT Deadline (2024)	December 7, 2024	Minneapolis, Minnesota	Minneapolis Armory	Sol Ruca vs. Stephanie Vaquer vs. Zaria vs. Giulia vs. Wren Sinclair in a Women's Iron Survivor Challenge to determine the #1 contender for the NXT Women's Championship at NXT: New Year's Evil	Oba Femi	5	Giulia	1	
4	NXT Deadline (2025)	December 6, 2025	San Antonio, Texas	Boeing Center at Tech Port	Je'Von Evans vs. Leon Slater vs. Joe Hendry vs. Dion Lennox vs. Myles Borne in a Men's Iron Survivor Challenge to determine the #1 contender for the NXT Championship at NXT: New Years' Evil	Je'Von Evans	2	Kendal Grey	2	

=== Men's Iron Survivor Challenge winner's championship opportunity ===
– Championship victory
– Championship match loss

	Winner	Event	Year	Championship match
1	Grayson Waller	NXT: New Year's Evil	2022	Waller lost to NXT Champion Bron Breakker by countout.
2	Trick Williams	NXT Vengeance Day	2023	Williams was originally supposed to challenge NXT Champion Ilja Dragunov at NXT: New Year's Evil, but the match was postponed due to an injury to Dragunov. Williams defended his title opportunity against Grayson Waller at the event before challenging Dragunov for the title at NXT Vengeance Day, but lost.
3	Oba Femi	NXT: New Year's Evil	2024	Femi challenged Trick Williams for the NXT Championship. Eddy Thorpe, who was originally supposed to compete in the Iron Survivor Challenge, faked being attacked beforehand to gain a title match against Williams on the December 17 episode of NXT. The match ended in a double pin, resulting in Thorpe being added to the match at New Year's Evil, making it a triple threat match. Femi would defeat Williams and Thorpe to win the title.
4	Je'Von Evans	NXT	2025	Evans was originally supposed to challenge NXT Champion Oba Femi at NXT: New Year's Evil, but on the December 9 episode of NXT, Evans demanded they have their title match later that night, but lost.

=== Women's Iron Survivor Challenge winner's championship opportunity ===
– Championship victory
– Championship match loss

	Winner	Event	Year	Championship match
1	Roxanne Perez	NXT	2022	Perez was originally supposed to challenge NXT Women's Champion Mandy Rose at NXT: New Year's Evil, but on the December 13 episode of NXT, Rose attacked Perez. Perez demanded they have their title match later that night, which she would win.
2	Blair Davenport	NXT: New Year's Evil	2023	Davenport lost to NXT Women's Champion Lyra Valkyria.
3	Giulia	NXT: New Year's Evil	2024	Giulia defeated Roxanne Perez to win the NXT Women's Championship.
4	Kendal Grey	NXT: New Year's Evil	2025	Grey lost to NXT Women's Champion Jacy Jayne.

== See also ==
- List of WWE pay-per-view and livestreaming supercards
