= Man Up =

Man Up may refer to:

== Entertainment ==
=== Music ===
- Man Up (The Blue Van album), a 2008 album by The Blue Van
- Man Up (Ice Cube album), a 2025 album by Ice Cube
- "Man Up", a song from the Broadway musical The Book of Mormon
- "Man Up", a song by Nikki Lane from the album All or Nothin'
- "Man Up", a song by Hailee Steinfeld from the album Half Written Story
- "Man Up", theme song of professional wrestler Kit Wilson

=== Film and TV ===
- Man Up (film), a 2015 film
- Man Up!, a 2011 sitcom

=== Radio ===
- WVBZ, a radio station licensed to Clemmons, North Carolina, United States and called 105.7 Man Up since 2015

== Other uses ==
- ROH Man Up, a professional-wrestling event
- Man Up, a development programme fostered by Destiny Church in New Zealand
