= New Year's Evil =

New Year's Evil may refer to:

- New Year's Evil (film), a 1980 film
- New Year's Evil (comics), Fifth-week event published by DC Comics
- New Year's Evil (Nancy Drew/Hardy Boys), a Supermystery novel
- New Year's Evil, a special episode of WCW Monday Nitro, December 27, 1999
- NXT: New Year's Evil, an annual special episode of WWE NXT, 2021–present
