= NXT: New Year's Evil (2025) =

WWE television special

- Promotional poster featuring Tony D'Angelo, Oba Femi, Giulia, Roxanne Perez, and Trick Williams
- Promotion: WWE
- Brand: NXT
- Date: January 7, 2025
- City: Los Angeles, California
- Venue: Shrine Expo Hall

NXT special episodes chronology
| ← Previous; NXT 2300 | Next → Roadblock |

NXT: New Year's Evil chronology
| ← Previous; 2024 | Next → 2026 |

The 2025 NXT: New Year's Evil was a professional wrestling television special produced by WWE, held exclusively for wrestlers from the promotion's developmental brand, NXT. It was WWE's fifth annual NXT: New Year's Evil, and the sixth New Year's Evil overall, and aired as a special episode of the weekly series NXT on The CW. The event took place on January 7, 2025, at the Shrine Expo Hall in Los Angeles, California and featured an appearance from The Rock.

As a result of NXT moving from the USA Network to The CW in October 2024, this was the first NXT: New Year's Evil to air on The CW. It was also the first and only NXT: New Year's Evil to not be held at NXT's home venue, the WWE Performance Center in Orlando, Florida, as the event returned there the following year.

Five matches were contested at the event. In the main event, Oba Femi defeated previous champion Trick Williams and Eddy Thorpe in a triple threat match to win the NXT Championship. In another prominent match, Giulia defeated Roxanne Perez to win the NXT Women's Championship.

== Production ==
=== Background ===
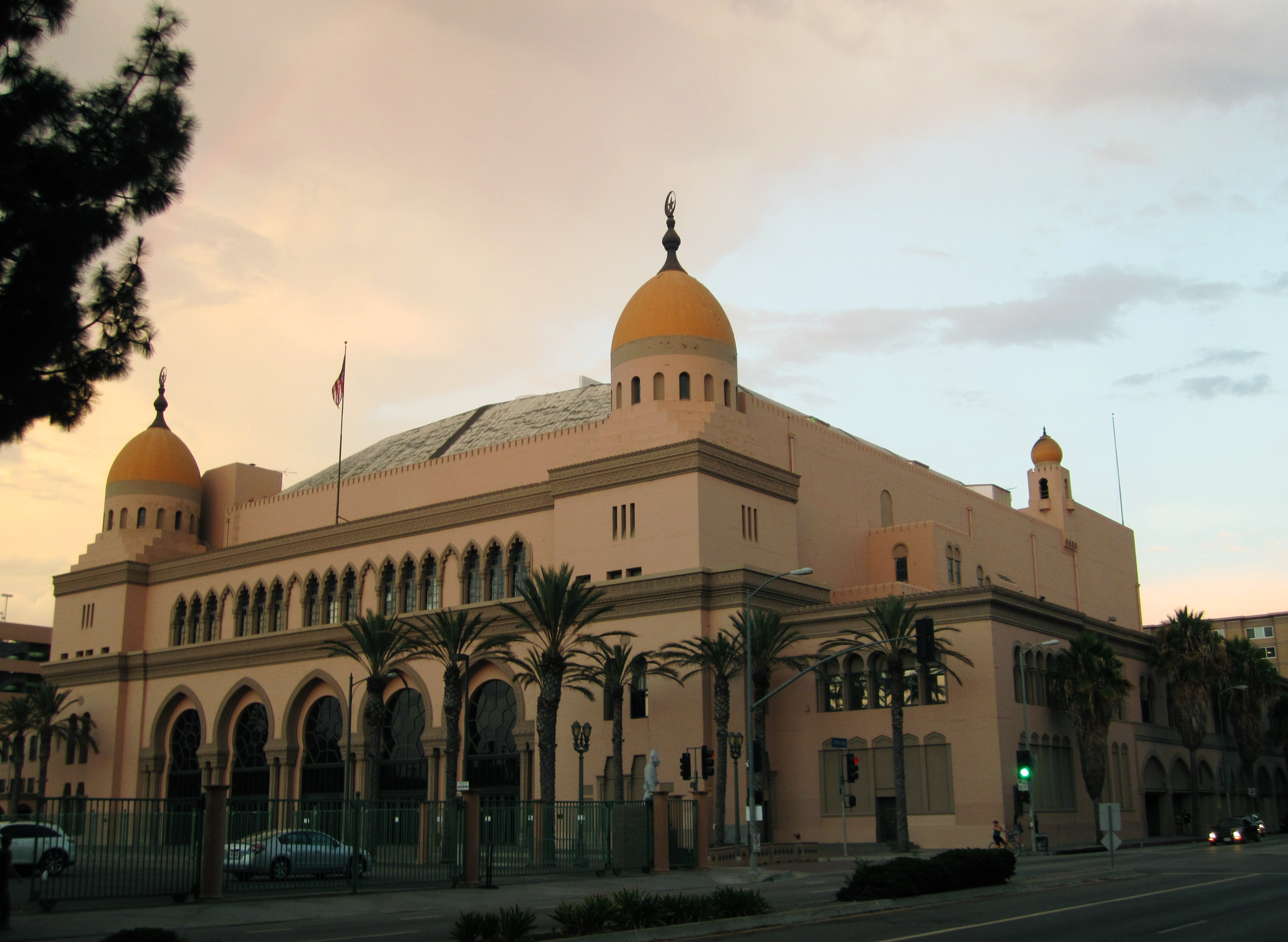
The fifth annual NXT: New Year's Evil, and sixth New Year's Evil overall, was held at the Shrine Expo Hall in Los Angeles, California.

New Year's Evil is a professional wrestling television special held around New Year's. It was originally produced by the former World Championship Wrestling (WCW) as a special episode of its Monday Nitro program on December 27, 1999; this was the only New Year's Evil held by WCW, and then in March 2001, WCW was acquired by WWE, at the time still known as the World Wrestling Federation (WWF; renamed WWE in 2002). After 21 years since that WCW event, WWE reinstated New Year's Evil in 2021 for its developmental brand, NXT, becoming an annual special episode of NXT in early January.

During Deadline on December 7, 2024, it was announced that the fifth NXT: New Year's Evil, and sixth New Year's Evil overall, would be held on January 7, 2025. It was broadcast on The CW and took place at the Shrine Expo Hall in Los Angeles, California. This was the first edition of the event to air on The CW after NXT's move from the USA Network to The CW in October 2024. This was also the first NXT: New Year's Evil to not be held at NXT's home venue, the WWE Performance Center in Orlando, Florida. On January 6, The Rock announced that he would make an appearance at the event.

=== Storylines ===
The card consisted of five matches that resulted from scripted storylines. Results were predetermined by WWE's writers on the NXT brand, while storylines were produced on WWE's weekly television program, NXT, and the supplementary online streaming show, Level Up.

At Deadline, Giulia won the Women's Iron Survivor Challenge to earn an NXT Women's Championship match against Roxanne Perez, with the match scheduled for New Year's Evil.

On the November 19, 2024, episode of NXT, Eddy Thorpe participated in an Iron Survivor Challenge qualifier where he lost to Nathan Frazer after being distracted by the NXT tag team division brawling outside the ring. Two weeks later, Thorpe won a fatal four-way last chance match to qualify for the Iron Survivor Challenge at Deadline. However, he was later found attacked backstage and was ruled out of Deadline. At the event, a returning Oba Femi took Thorpe's place and won the Men's Iron Survivor Challenge to earn an NXT Championship match against Trick Williams at New Year's Evil. On the following episode of NXT, Thorpe confronted Williams and Femi, stating that Femi was the one who attacked him. Thorpe also demanded a title shot, which Williams agreed. Upon signing the title match contract, Thorpe revealed to NXT General Manager Ava that he staged his own attack to ease his way into an NXT Championship match. The title match on the December 17 episode ended in a double pinfall with Williams retaining. The following week, Thorpe disputed the result of the match, and Williams stated that he would defend the championship in a triple threat match against Thorpe and Femi at New Year's Evil, which was made official by Ava.

On the October 29, 2024, episode of NXT, Lexis King faced No Quarter Catch Crew's Charlie Dempsey for the NXT Heritage Cup. King was accompanied by Dempsey's father, William Regal. During the match, Regal passed his signature brass knuckles for King to use against Dempsey, but King refused, wanting to win the Cup on his own merit and lost the match by 0–2. On the December 24 episode, King, again with Regal as his cornerman, faced Dempsey in a rematch for the Heritage Cup. Regal again passed the brass knuckles to King, but King again refused. Regal then punched King to which the brass knuckles fell into the ring. The referee disqualified Dempsey and crowned King the new NXT Heritage Cup Champion after he saw Dempsey with the brass knuckles and assumed that Dempsey used it on King. However, due to a grey area in the British Rounds Rules on whether the Cup can change hands via disqualification of the reigning champion, Ava ordered King to give the Cup back to Dempsey (WWE would still recognize King as the official champion) and announced that they would face each other in a one-fall match for the Cup at New Year's Evil, which would be the first time that a match for the Cup would not be contested under British Rounds Rules.

On the December 10, 2024, episode of NXT, Cora Jade attacked Stephanie Vaquer backstage, resulting in a tag team match between Jade and Roxanne Perez and Vaquer's ally, Giulia, and Kelani Jordan, which was won by Jade and Perez. After the match, Vaquer attacked Jade. This led to a match between Jade and Vaquer two weeks later, which Vaquer won. After the match, Jordan attacked Jade as Vaquer tried to restrain Jordan. Later that night backstage, Jordan confronted Vaquer and said she did not need her help, but Lola Vice appeared and said Vaquer was looking out for Jordan. This led to a match between Jordan and Vice the following week, which Jordan won after interference from Jade, who attacked both women after the match, but Vaquer came to their defense. Vice subsequently tried to hit Jade, but accidentally hit Vaquer instead. Later that night backstage, an argument and brawl ensued between Jordan, Vice, and Vaquer, much to the delight of Jade. NXT General Manager Ava subsequently scheduled a fatal four-way match for New Year's Evil, where the winner would become the #1 contender for the NXT Women's North American Championship.

On the November 26, 2024, episode of NXT, Fallon Henley defeated Tatum Paxley to retain the NXT Women's North American Championship after interference from Henley's Fatal Influence stablemates, Jacy Jayne and Jazmyn Nyx. After the match, the group attacked Paxley, who was saved by the returning Gigi Dolin. Two weeks later, Jayne and Nyx defeated Dolin and Paxley in a tag team match. After the match, Fatal Influence attacked Dolin and Paxley, but the returning Shotzi appeared to even the odds. On the December 31 episode, Dolin and Shotzi competed in a triple threat tag team match, which they lost after interference from Fatal Influence. A six-woman tag team match between the two teams was later scheduled for New Year's Evil.

== Results ==
| No. | Results | Stipulations | Times |
|---|---|---|---|
| 1 | Giulia defeated Roxanne Perez (c) by pinfall | Singles match for the NXT Women's Championship | 11:14 |
| 2 | Stephanie Vaquer defeated Cora Jade, Kelani Jordan, and Lola Vice by pinfall (Note: Although Vaquer won the match, later that night, Shotzi won a six-woman tag team match by pinning the NXT North American Champion Fallon Henley. After an argument between Shotzi and Vaquer, they faced each other on the following episode of NXT to determine who would indeed face Henley for the championship, which Shotzi won. After Shotzi lost the championship match, Vaquer would have a chance against Henley for the championship at Vengeance Day.) | Fatal four-way match to determine the #1 contender for the NXT Women's North American Championship | 9:00 |
| 3 | Gigi Dolin, Shotzi, and Tatum Paxley defeated Fatal Influence (Jacy Jayne, Fallon Henley, and Jazmyn Nyx) by pinfall | Six-woman tag team match | 10:14 |
| 4 | Lexis King (c) defeated Charlie Dempsey (with Tavion Heights, Myles Borne, and Wren Sinclair) by pinfall | Sudden Death Rules for the NXT Heritage Cup | 11:01 |
| 5 | Oba Femi defeated Trick Williams (c) and Eddy Thorpe by pinfall | Triple threat match for the NXT Championship | 10:43 |
(c) / – the champion(s) heading into the match
