= NXT Deadline (2022) =

WWE premium live event

- Promotional poster featuring Joe Gacy, JD McDonagh, Axiom, Carmelo Hayes, and Grayson Waller
- Promotion: WWE
- Brand: NXT
- Date: December 10, 2022
- City: Orlando, Florida
- Venue: WWE Performance Center

WWE event chronology
← Previous; Survivor Series: WarGames	Next → Royal Rumble

NXT Deadline chronology
← Previous; First	Next → 2023

NXT major events chronology
← Previous; Halloween Havoc	Next → Vengeance Day

The 2022 NXT Deadline (stylized as DEADL1NE) was a professional wrestling premium live event (PLE) produced by WWE, held for wrestlers from the promotion's developmental brand, NXT. It was the inaugural Deadline and took place on Saturday, December 10, 2022, at NXT's home venue, the WWE Performance Center in Orlando, Florida. The event debuted the Iron Survivor Challenge for both the men and women, a 25-minute five-person match in which a wrestler attempts to score the most falls before the deadline in order to win and earn a match for the NXT Championship and NXT Women's Championship, respectively.

Seven matches were contested at the event, including two dark matches that were later streamed on Level Up. In the main event, Bron Breakker defeated Apollo Crews to retain the NXT Championship. For the event's Iron Survivor Challenges, Grayson Waller won the men's, while the women's, which was the opening bout, was won by Roxanne Perez. In another notable match, SmackDown's The New Day (Kofi Kingston and Xavier Woods) defeated Pretty Deadly (Elton Prince and Kit Wilson) to win the NXT Tag Team Championship for the first time, becoming the third WWE Tag Team Triple Crown Champions. This also marked their record 12th WWE-branded tag team championship as a team, and Kingston's record 15th WWE-branded tag team title individually.

Deadline replaced NXT WarGames as the brand's December PLE, as the WarGames concept was moved to the main roster beginning with that year's Survivor Series. This would be WWE's final PLE to be available to livestream on the Australian version of the WWE Network before it transferred to Binge on January 23, 2023.

== Production ==
=== Background ===
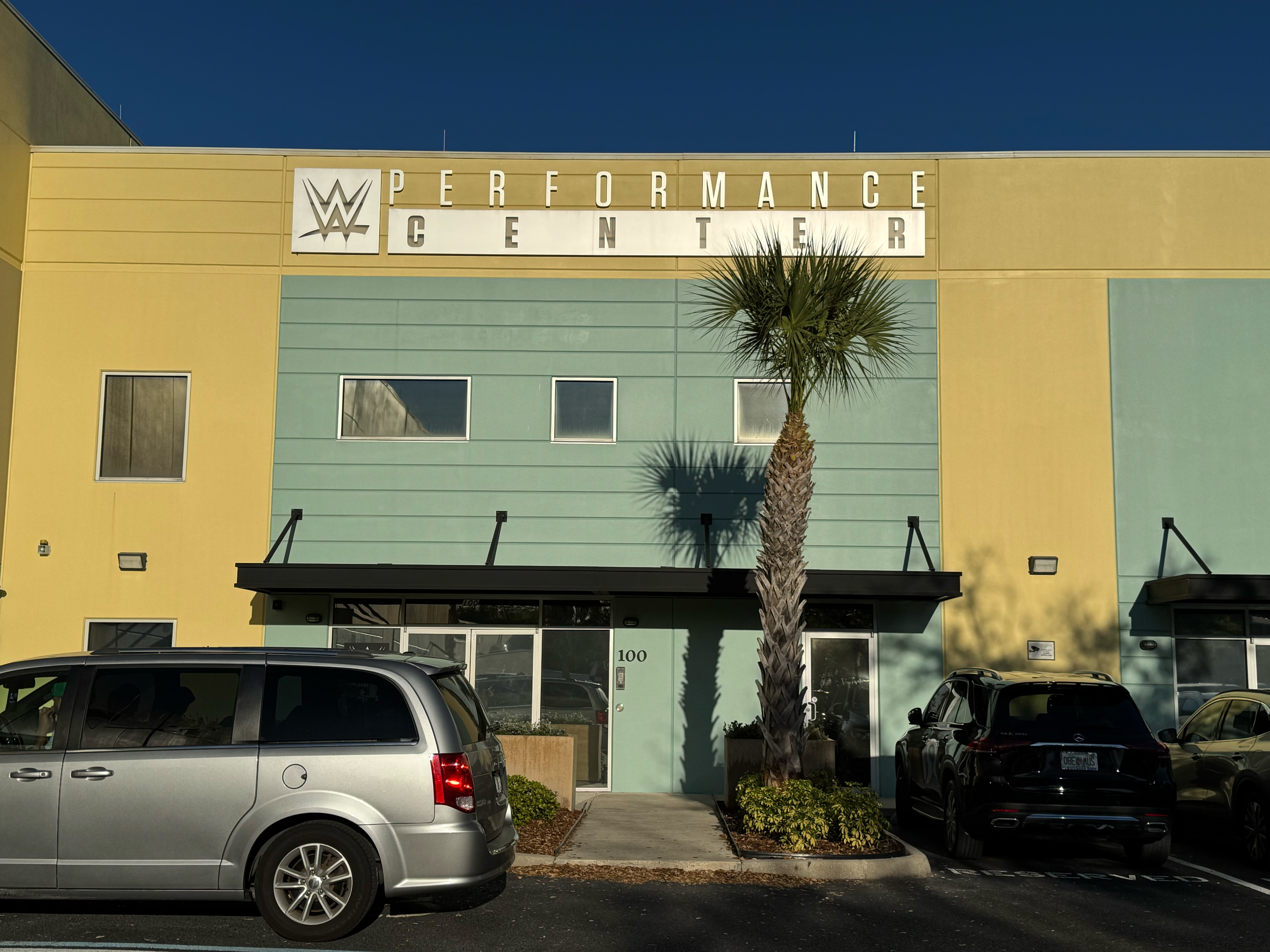
The inaugural NXT Deadline was held at NXT's home venue, the WWE Performance Center in Orlando, Florida.

On October 15, 2022, the American professional wrestling promotion WWE filed to trademark the name "NXT Deadline" for its developmental brand, NXT. During a media conference on October 21 the night before NXT Halloween Havoc, WWE executive Shawn Michaels confirmed that NXT's next premium live event (PLE) would be Deadline. It was scheduled to be held on Saturday, December 10 at NXT's home venue, the WWE Performance Center in Orlando, Florida. It replaced NXT WarGames as the brand's December PLE, after the WarGames concept was moved to the main roster beginning with that year's Survivor Series for the Raw and SmackDown brands.

=== Broadcast outlets ===
The PLE was broadcast on WWE's livestreaming platforms. These included Peacock in the United States, SonyLIV in India, Disney+ Hotstar in Indonesia, Disney+ in the Philippines, and the WWE Network everywhere else. This would be WWE's final PLE to be available to livestream on the Australian version of the WWE Network before it transferred to Binge on January 23, 2023.

=== Storylines ===
The card included matches that resulted from scripted storylines. Results were predetermined by WWE's writers on the NXT brand, while storylines were produced on the weekly television program, NXT, and the supplementary online streaming show, Level Up.

On the November 15 episode of NXT, WWE executive Shawn Michaels announced a new match format for WWE called the Iron Survivor Challenge, which would occur at Deadline, with one each for the men and women. The rules are as follows:

- Five wrestlers compete in the match, which lasts 25 minutes.
- Two wrestlers start the match, which begins the timer, and every five minutes, another wrestler enters with the fifth and final participant entering at the 15-minute mark.
- Each time a wrestler scores a pinfall, submission, or being the victim of a disqualification, they gain a point. Points can be gained even before other participants have entered.
- A wrestler who is pinned, submitted, or is disqualified goes into a penalty box for 90 seconds.
- The winner of the match, dubbed the Iron Survivor, is the wrestler who scores the most points at the end of the 25-minute time limit (the "deadline"). In the result of a tie, those who are tied enter sudden death overtime.
- The winners of the men's and women's matches become the number one contenders for the NXT Championship and NXT Women's Championship, respectively.

On the November 29 episode of NXT, the first four contestants for the men's Iron Survivor Challenge were revealed as Carmelo Hayes, JD McDonagh, Grayson Waller, and Joe Gacy, while for the women's match, Zoey Stark, Cora Jade, Roxanne Perez, and Kiana James were revealed as the first four participants. The following week, Axiom won the fifth and final spot in the men's match by defeating Von Wagner and Andre Chase in a triple threat match, while Indi Hartwell won the fifth and final spot in the women's by defeating Wendy Choo and Fallon Henley, also in a triple threat match.

On the November 15 episode of NXT, Apollo Crews warned NXT Champion Bron Breakker that his goal was to become champion. Later, after Crews's match, Breakker appeared to confront him. The following week, Breakker was scheduled to defend the NXT Championship against Crews at Deadline.

On the December 6 episode of NXT, while NXT Tag Team Champions Pretty Deadly (Elton Prince and Kit Wilson) were reading a Christmas story, they were interrupted by SmackDown roster members The New Day (Kofi Kingston and Xavier Woods), who attacked the duo and challenged them for the title. The match was made official for Deadline.

On the November 15 episode of NXT, Alba Fyre lost her NXT Women's Championship match thanks to interference from Isla Dawn, who made her NXT debut. On the December 6 episode, Fyre attacked Dawn after the latter's match. Later that night, a match between Fyre and Dawn was made official for Deadline.

== Event ==
Other on-screen personnel
Role:	Name:
Commentators	Vic Joseph
Commentators	Booker T
Spanish commentators	Marcelo Rodríguez
Spanish commentators	Jerry Soto
Ring announcer	Alicia Taylor
Referees	Adrian Butler
Referees	Chip Danning
Referees	Dallas Irvin
Referees	Derek Sanders
Referees	Joey Gonzalez
Pre-show panel	Sam Roberts
Pre-show panel	McKenzie Mitchell
Pre-show panel	Denise Salcedo

=== Dark matches ===
Before the event went live, two dark matches took place that would later stream on the December 16 episode of Level Up. In the first, Ivy Nile (with Tatum Paxley) defeated Lash Legend, while in the second, Chase University (Andre Chase and Duke Hudson) (with Thea Hail) defeated the team of Javier Bernal and Xyon Quinn.

=== Preliminary matches ===
The actual PLE began with the women's Iron Survivor Challenge, featuring Indi Hartwell, Cora Jade, Kiana James, Roxanne Perez, and Zoey Stark as the five participants. Perez and Stark were the first two entrants. James entered third. Stark performed a K-360 on Perez to score the first point. Jade entered fourth. Perez attempted Pop Rocks on James, but Jade tossed Perez aside and performed a Superkick on James to score a point. Hartwell entered last and pinned Perez after a big boot to score a point. Perez pinned Stark with a roll-up to score a point. Perez performed Pop Rocks on Jade to bring herself in the lead. In the end, Jade performed a DDT on Perez, who rolled out of the ring as the time expired. As a result, Perez won the match with two points, and was named the women's Iron Survivor.

In the second match, Alba Fyre took on Isla Dawn. In the end, Fyre performed a Swanton Bomb, but the referee coughed up black goo. Dawn took advantage by shoving Fyre into an exposed turnbuckle, and then performed the Eye of the Hurricane to win the match.

In the third match, Pretty Deadly (Kit Wilson and Elton Prince) defended the NXT Tag Team Championship against The New Day (Kofi Kingston and Xavier Woods). During the match, all four competitors tossed one of the title belts to the other to pretend that they were hit by them, in an homage to Eddie Guerrero. In the climax, Wilson and Prince attempted Spilt Milk on Woods, but Kingston pulled Wilson out of the ring and performed Trouble in Paradise. Kingston and Woods then performed the Midnight Hour on Prince to win the titles for the first time, making them the third WWE Tag Team Triple Crown Champions. This also marked their record 12th WWE-branded tag team championship as a team, and record 15th WWE-branded tag team title for Kingston individually.

The penultimate match was the men's Iron Survivor Challenge, with Axiom, Joe Gacy, Carmelo Hayes, JD McDonagh, and Grayson Waller as the five participants. McDonagh, the first entrant, attacked Axiom, the second entrant, during the latter's entrance. The third entrant was Hayes, who pinned Axiom after suplexing McDonagh onto him to score the first point. The fourth entrant was Waller, who performed Ace Crushers on Axiom and McDonagh to pin both men and score two points. Axiom rolled up Waller to score a point, and performed the Golden Ratio on McDonagh to score another. The final entrant was Gacy, who forced Axiom to submit to the Rings of Saturn to score a point, and pinned Hayes after performing the Upside-Down World to score another. Hayes forced Waller to submit to a crossface to score another point. In the closing moments, Hayes performed a diving leg drop on Axiom, but Waller dragged Hayes out of the ring and pinned Axiom himself to score his third point. Waller then ran around the ring until the time expired, winning the match and being named the men's Iron Survivor.

=== Main event ===
In the main event, Bron Breakker defended the NXT Championship against Apollo Crews. This was an evenly contested match. At one point, Crews performed a Military Press Powerslam of his own on Breakker for a nearfall. In the end, Breakker performed a Spear on Crews to retain the title. After the match, Grayson Waller appeared and performed an Ace Crusher on Breakker. Waller then held the title over Breakker as the event ended.

== Reception ==
Thomas Hall of 411Mania gave the event an 8.5 out of 10. He was critical of the twist ending during the Dawn-Fyre match but praised the rest of the card, highlighting the men's Iron Survivor Challenge for being the energetic "race against the clock" he hoped the women's Challenge would be (which he also found good). He concluded: "It's definitely not a Takeover, but for the new generation of NXT, this worked out very well ... Not a classic, but it's an easy watch with good stuff throughout and that's a nice way to go." Kevin Berge of Bleacher Report gave praise to the NXT Tag Title bout and men's Iron Survivor Challenge but was critical of the "deflating" finish to the Dawn-Fyre match and felt the NXT Championship main event came across as "a filler title defense for NXT television."

== Aftermath ==
After Deadline, it was announced that Roxanne Perez and Grayson Waller would get their respective championship matches at NXT: New Year's Evil on January 10, 2023. On the following episode of NXT, however, NXT Women's Champion Mandy Rose attacked Perez. The women's title match was subsequently rescheduled for that episode's main event, where Perez defeated Rose to win the title for the first time, ending Rose's reign at 413 days. The next day, Rose was released from WWE due to violating the terms of her contract by posting explicit content on her FanTime page (a subscription website similar to OnlyFans).

Also on NXT, NXT Tag Team Champions The New Day (Kofi Kingston and Xavier Woods) celebrated their win at Deadline, only for Pretty Deadly (Kit Wilson and Elton Prince) to interrupt. Kingston and Woods told them that they would get a championship rematch if they recited the Pledge of Allegiance. However, Josh Briggs and Brooks Jensen interrupted, and recited the pledge themselves. As a result, they became the new number one contenders. The match was scheduled for the December 20 episode, where Kingston and Woods retained. Prior to the match, Kingston and Woods agreed to give Wilson and Prince a rematch if they found everything on a list. On the January 3, 2023, episode, Wilson and Prince stated that at New Year's Evil, they would be competing in a gauntlet match against three other teams to determine the number one contenders for the NXT Tag Team Championship. At New Year's Evil, Pretty Deadly were the last team eliminated by a returning Gallus (Mark Coffey and Wolfgang). The following week, Pretty Deadly interrupted The New Day as they spoke in the ring, followed by Gallus, and then a brawl between the three teams, which led to Pretty Deadly being added to the match, turning it into a triple threat tag team match, and the match was subsequently scheduled for Vengeance Day.

At New Year's Evil, Grayson Waller's match against Bron Breakker for the NXT Championship ended when the middle rope snapped, causing Waller to fall out of the ring and be counted out, allowing Breakker to retain the title. Due to the issue of the ropes, a Steel Cage match between the two for the title was subsequently scheduled for Vengeance Day.

An Extreme Resolution match between Alba Fyre and Isla Dawn was scheduled for the January 3, 2023, episode of NXT, where Fyre was victorious. After failing to win the NXT Women's Tag Team Championship three weeks later, Fyre walked backstage, and Dawn met her there. On the January 31 episode, Fyre sided with Dawn, thus turning heel in the process.

A second NXT Deadline was confirmed for December 9, 2023, thus establishing Deadline as NXT's annual December event.

== Results ==
No.	Results	Stipulations	Times
1^{D}	Ivy Nile (with Tatum Paxley) defeated Lash Legend	Singles match	5:04
2^{D}	Chase University (Duke Hudson and Andre Chase) (with Thea Hail) defeated Javier Bernal and Xyon Quinn	Tag team match	7:16
3	Roxanne Perez (2) defeated Zoey Stark (1), Cora Jade (1), Kiana James (0), and Indi Hartwell (1)	Women's Iron Survivor Challenge to determine the #1 contender for the NXT Women's Championship	25:00
4	Isla Dawn defeated Alba Fyre by pinfall	Singles match	9:52
5	The New Day (Kofi Kingston and Xavier Woods) defeated Pretty Deadly (Elton Prince and Kit Wilson) (c) by pinfall	Tag team match for the NXT Tag Team Championship	14:05
6	Grayson Waller (3) defeated Carmelo Hayes (2), JD McDonagh (0), Joe Gacy (2), and Axiom (2)	Men's Iron Survivor Challenge to determine the #1 contender for the NXT Championship	25:00
7	Bron Breakker (c) defeated Apollo Crews by pinfall	Singles match for the NXT Championship	14:34
(c) / – the champion(s) heading into the match; D / – this was a dark match

=== Women's Iron Survivor Challenge statistics ===
- Entry Order: Roxanne Perez, Zoey Stark, Kiana James, Cora Jade, and Indi Hartwell

Score					Point winner	Fall loser	Decision	Notes	Time
Jade	Hartwell	James	Perez	Stark	Point winner	Fall loser	Decision	Notes	Time
0	0	0	0	1	Zoey Stark	Roxanne Perez	Pinfall	Pinned after the Z-360	9:31
1	0	0	0	1	Cora Jade	Kiana James	Pinfall	Pinned after a superkick	12:38
1	1	0	0	1	Indi Hartwell	Roxanne Perez	Pinfall	Pinned after a big boot	16:00
1	1	0	1	1	Roxanne Perez	Zoey Stark	Pinfall	Pinned with a schoolgirl	18:37
1	1	0	2	1	Roxanne Perez	Cora Jade	Pinfall	Pinned after the Pop Rox	23:01
Winner					Roxanne Perez	—N/a			25:00

=== Men's Iron Survivor Challenge statistics ===
- Entry Order: JD McDonagh, Axiom, Carmelo Hayes, Grayson Waller, and Joe Gacy

Score					Point winner	Fall loser	Decision	Notes	Time
Axiom	Gacy	Hayes	McDonagh	Waller	Point winner	Fall loser	Decision	Notes	Time
0	0	1	0	0	Carmelo Hayes	Axiom	Pinfall	Pinned after performing an lifting cutter on McDonagh onto Axiom	7:12
0	0	1	0	1	Grayson Waller	Axiom	Pinfall	Pinned after a rolling thunder bulldog	10:13
0	0	1	0	2	Grayson Waller	JD McDonagh	Pinfall	Pinned after a rolling thunder stunner	10:17
1	0	1	0	2	Axiom	Grayson Waller	Pinfall	Pinned with a roll-up	14:14
2	0	1	0	2	Axiom	JD McDonagh	Pinfall	Pinned after the Golden Ratio	14:36
2	1	1	0	2	Joe Gacy	Axiom	Submission	Submitted to the Rings of Saturn	16:02
2	2	1	0	2	Joe Gacy	Carmelo Hayes	Pinfall	Pinned after The Upside Down	17:11
2	2	2	0	2	Carmelo Hayes	Grayson Waller	Submission	Submitted to an arm-trap crossface	19:24
2	2	2	0	3	Grayson Waller	Axiom	Pinfall	Pinned after Hayes hit Axiom with Nothing But Net	24:30
Winner					Grayson Waller	—N/a			25:00
