= NXT: New Year's Evil (2023) =

WWE television special

- Promotion: WWE
- Brand: NXT
- Date: January 10, 2023
- City: Orlando, Florida
- Venue: WWE Performance Center

NXT special episodes chronology
← Previous; Heatwave	Next → Roadblock

NXT: New Year's Evil chronology
← Previous; 2022	Next → 2024

The 2023 NXT: New Year's Evil was a professional wrestling television special produced by WWE, held exclusively for wrestlers from the promotion's developmental brand, NXT. It was WWE's third annual NXT: New Year's Evil, and the fourth New Year's Evil overall, and aired as a special episode of the weekly series NXT on the USA Network. The event took place on January 10, 2023, at NXT's home venue, the WWE Performance Center in Orlando, Florida for a third consecutive year.

Six matches were contested at the event. In the main event, Toxic Attraction members Gigi Dolin and Jacy Jayne co-won a 20-woman Battle Royal to become the number one contenders for Roxanne Perez's NXT Women's Championship. In other prominent matches, Bron Breakker defeated Grayson Waller via countout to retain the NXT Championship, and Dijak defeated Tony D'Angelo to become the number one contender for the NXT North American Championship. The event also saw the NXT return of Jinder Mahal, who defeated Julius Creed, as well as Gallus (Mark Coffey and Wolfgang), who won a gauntlet match to become the number one contenders for The New Day's (Kofi Kingston and Xavier Woods) NXT Tag Team Championship.

== Production ==
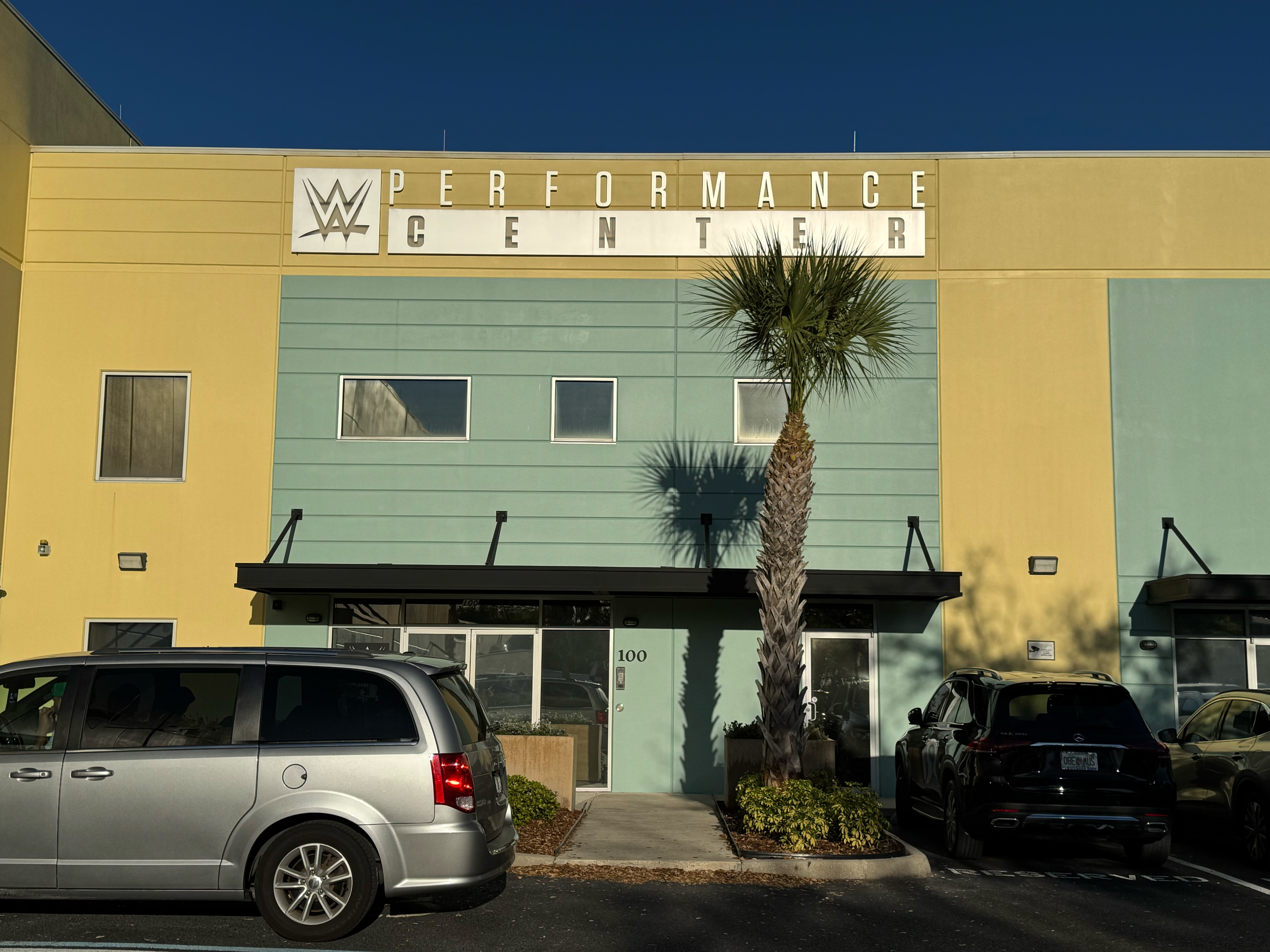
The third annual NXT: New Year's Evil, and fourth New Year's Evil overall, was held at NXT's home venue, the WWE Performance Center in Orlando, Florida for a third consecutive year.

=== Background ===
New Year's Evil is a professional wrestling television special held around New Year's. It was originally produced by the former World Championship Wrestling (WCW) as a special episode of its Monday Nitro program on December 27, 1999; this was the only New Year's Evil held by WCW, and then in March 2001, WCW was acquired by WWE, at the time still known as the World Wrestling Federation (WWF; renamed WWE in 2002). After 21 years since that WCW event, WWE reinstated New Year's Evil in 2021 for its developmental brand, NXT, becoming an annual special episode of NXT in early January.

During Deadline on December 10, 2022, it was announced that the third NXT: New Year's Evil, and fourth New Year's Evil overall, would be held on January 10, 2023. It was broadcast on the USA Network and took place at NXT's home venue, the WWE Performance Center in Orlando, Florida for a third consecutive year.

=== Storylines ===
The card included six matches that resulted from scripted storylines. Results were predetermined by WWE's writers on the NXT brand, while storylines were produced on the weekly television program, NXT, and the supplementary online streaming show, Level Up.

At Deadline, Grayson Waller won the inaugural men's Iron Survivor Challenge match, thus becoming the number one contender for the NXT Championship. Later that night after Bron Breakker retained the title, Waller attacked Breakker. The next day, it was announced that Waller would receive his title match against Breakker at New Year's Evil.

On the January 3 episode of NXT, Toxic Attraction (Gigi Dolin and Jacy Jayne) declared 2023 their year and wanted a shot at Roxanne Perez's NXT Women's Championship. Afterwards, the NXT women's locker room started brawling before Perez announced a 20-woman Battle Royal for New Year's Evil, where the winner would face Perez for the title at NXT Vengeance Day.

At Deadline, The New Day (Kofi Kingston and Xavier Woods) defeated Pretty Deadly (Elton Prince and Kit Wilson) to win the NXT Tag Team Championship. On the December 20 episode of NXT, Kingston and Woods agreed to give Wilson and Prince a rematch if the found everything on a list. On the January 3, 2023, episode, Wilson and Prince stated that at New Year's Evil, they would be participating in a gauntlet match to determine the number one contenders for the title.

On the December 27, 2022, episode of NXT, Tony D'Angelo lost his NXT North American Championship match after interference from Dijak. The following week, a match between Dijak and D'Angelo was scheduled for New Year's Evil, where the winner would be the number one contender for the title at Vengeance Day.

On the December 27, 2022, episode of NXT, Drew Gulak taught Hank Walker a lesson in wrestling, teaching him how to grapple and submit two competitors while Walker watched, stating that when an opponent submitted, he must release the hold immediately. The final competitor, Myles Borne, gave Gulak more resistance, and as such, Gulak would not release the hold after Borne submitted, resulting in Gulak being separated. This also brought out Charlie Dempsey, setting up a match between him and Walker. However, the following week, Dempsey was not medically cleared to compete, and after Gulak won his match, Dempsey revealed that he would face Walker at New Year's Evil.

On the October 25, 2022, episode of NXT, Indus Sher (Sanga and Veer Mahaan) had a staredown with The Creed Brothers (Brutus Creed and Julius Creed). On the December 27 episode, after Julius won his match, Indus Sher again confronted The Creed Brothers and challenged them to a match at New Year's Evil, which The Creed Brothers accepted.

== Event ==
=== Preliminary matches ===
The television special began with Tony D'Angelo (accompanied by Channing "Stacks" Lorenzo) taking on Dijak to determine the number one contender for the NXT North American Championship. During the match, Lorenzo interfered in the match, only to be handcuffed to the ropes by Dijak. In the end, while D'Angelo was arguing with Lorenzo about taking the bullet for D'Angelo, Dijak performed a Cyclone Boot on D'Angelo to become the number one contender for the title.

Next, The Creed Brothers (Brutus Creed and Julius Creed) were scheduled to take on Indus Sher (Sanga and Veer Mahaan). However, Sanga revealed that Veer wasn't there and instead, Jinder Mahal made his return. Mahal and Sanga then attacked The Creed Brothers.

The second match was the gauntlet match to determine the number one contenders for the NXT Tag Team Championship. Pretty Deadly (Kit Wilson and Elton Prince) picked their first opponents as two enhancement talents, "The Rockers" (Jimmy Jackson and Brian Williams). Wilson and Prince eliminated The Rockers following Spilt Milk before Malik Blade and Edris Enofé entered next. As Blade attempted a pinning combination on Prince, Wilson reversed the pin to eliminated Enofé and Blade. Josh Briggs and Brooks Jensen were supposed to enter last, however, they were found beaten down, and a returning Gallus (Mark Coffey and Wolfgang) took their place. Gallus performed an Enziguri/Bodyslam combination on Prince, and Wolfgang pinned him to become the number one contenders for the NXT Tag Team Championship.

Following this, footage was shown of Carmelo Hayes and Trick Williams in Apollo Crews' cafe, and Hayes writing a diary about being himself. Hayes and Williams talked about taking Crews down before drinking coffee.

After that, the "Countdown to the New Year" vignette was revealed to be a returning Tiffany Stratton, who talked about her return.

In the third match, Bron Breakker defended the NXT Championship against Grayson Waller. During the match, Waller sent Breakker into the middle turnbuckle, which fell apart, causing the referees to repair the ring. In the climax, as Waller attempted his elbow drop, the middle rope snapped. Waller was unable to make it to the ring before the ten count, thus Breakker retained by countout.

Next, Apollo Crews watched Carmelo Hayes and Trick Williams' promo on a tablet when Axiom showed up. The two then agreed to team up to face Hayes and Williams the following week.

In the fourth match, Hank Walker (accompanied by Drew Gulak) took on Charlie Dempsey. In the end, Dempsey applied a bow and arrow submission hold on Walker. Dempsey rolled Walker to the center of the ring to force a submission and win the match.

Next, while Sol Ruca was practicing handstands backstage, she was confronted by Alba Fyre, setting up a match between the two for the following week.

In the penultimate match, Jinder Mahal (accompanied by Sanga) took on Julius Creed. In the climax, Sanga appeared and distracted Julius, allowing Mahal to avoid a Shooting Star Press. Mahal followed up with a Yakuza Kick and the Khallas to win the match.

Before the main event, Fallon Henley and Kiana James checked on Josh Briggs and Brooks Jensen backstage, and also mocked Gallus (Mark Coffey and Wolfgang). This would set up a match pitting Briggs and Jensen against Gallus for the following week.

=== Main event ===
The main event was the 20-woman Battle Royal to determine the number one contender for Roxanne Perez's NXT Women's Championship at NXT Vengeance Day. At the start of the match, Lyra Valkyria eliminated Cora Jade, followed by Kiana James eliminating Tatum Paxley and almost doing the same to Fallon Henley, only for James to prevent Henley from elimination. After Lash Legend eliminated Amari Miller, Sol Ruca walked on her hands to prevent elimination. Afterwards, Valentina Feroz was eliminated by Thea Hail. Indi Hartwell would then eliminate Legend, followed by Valkyria performing a Hurricanrana on James to eliminate her. Zoey Stark then tossed Dani Palmer onto Legend and James outside the ring to eliminate her. Jade then returned, only to be tossed over the top rope by Valkyria again. After Ivy Nile was eliminated, Toxic Attraction (Gigi Dolin and Jacy Jayne) eliminated Hartwell. Hail and Henley were eliminated followed by Nikkita Lyons performing a spin kick on Elektra Lopez to eliminate her. Wendy Choo prevented elimination with a pillow, only for Lopez to pull it from Choo to elimiante her. Stark eliminated Lyons before being eliminated by Ruca, who went for a backflip, but Alba Fyre intercepted her with a superkick. This was followed by Fyre eliminating Ruca, bringing the final four to Jayne, Dolin, Fyre, and Valkyria. Valkyria managed to eliminate Fyre and Jade returned again, only to be sent over the top rope by Valkyria, who was also eliminated, again. Afterwards, the two brawled. In the closing moments, Dolin and Jayne punched each other, sending both to the floor at the same time. It was then announced that Dolin and Jayne co-won the match and would face Perez for the NXT Women's Championship at NXT Vengeance Day.

Afterwards, Shawn Michaels was shown at a conference table, where he announced that due to the issue with the ropes, Bron Breakker and Grayson Waller would face each other for the NXT Championship again at NXT Vengeance Day, this time in a Steel Cage match, as the event ended.

== Aftermath ==
On the following episode of NXT, Apollo Crews and Axiom defeated Carmelo Hayes and Trick Williams. The following week, Crews challenged Hayes to a two out of three falls match, which was scheduled for Vengeance Day.

Also on NXT, Gallus (Mark Coffey and Wolfgang) defeated Josh Briggs and Brooks Jensen. Later that night, Pretty Deadly (Kit Wilson and Elton Prince) interrupted NXT Tag Team Champions The New Day (Kofi Kingston and Xavier Woods) as they spoke in the ring, followed by Gallus, and then a brawl started between the teams, which led to Pretty Deadly being added to the title match, turning it into a triple threat tag team match, and the match was scheduled for Vengeance Day. However, on the January 24 episode, The New Day announced a tag team invitational for the following week, where the winners would be added to the title match, turning it into a fatal four-way tag team match, which was won by Chase University (Andre Chase and Duke Hudson).

Toxic Attraction (Gigi Dolin and Jacy Jayne) talked about how they won the battle royal before Lyra Valkyria interrupted. Dolin and Jayne then attacked Valkyria before NXT Women's Champion Roxanne Perez made the save. This led to a tag team match for that episode's main event where Perez and Valkyria defeated Dolin and Jayne after interference from Cora Jade, who went right after Valkyria.

Alba Fyre and Sol Ruca also had their match on the following episode of NXT, where Ruca won after interference from Isla Dawn. The following week, after Fyre and Ruca failed to win the NXT Women's Tag Team Championship, Fyre walked backstage, where Dawn met her. On the January 31 episode, Fyre turned heel, siding with Dawn.

On the January 24 episode of NXT, after The Creed Brothers (Brutus Creed and Julius Creed) won their match, they were confronted by Indus Sher (Jinder Mahal, Veer, and Sanga), leading to a match between the two teams for the following week, where Indus Sher (Sanga and Veer) were victorious. On the February 14 episode of NXT, Mahal challenged Bron Breakker for the NXT Championship, and the match was scheduled for the following week, where Breakker retained. A six-man tag team match pitting Breakker and The Creed Brothers against Indus Sher was then scheduled for NXT: Roadblock, which was won by Breakker and The Creed Brothers.

== Results ==
No.	Results	Stipulations	Times
1	Dijak defeated Tony D'Angelo (with Channing "Stacks" Lorenzo) by pinfall	Singles match to determine the #1 contender to the NXT North American Championship at NXT Vengeance Day	10:04
2	Gallus (Mark Coffey and Wolfgang) defeated Pretty Deadly (Elton Prince and Kit Wilson), Edris Enofé and Malik Blade, and "The Rockers" Jimmy Jackson and Brian Williams	Gauntlet match to determine the #1 contenders to the NXT Tag Team Championship	9:36
3	Bron Breakker (c) defeated Grayson Waller by countout	Singles match for the NXT Championship	12:22
4	Charlie Dempsey defeated Hank Walker (with Drew Gulak) by submission	Singles match	4:34
5	Jinder Mahal (with Sanga) defeated Julius Creed by pinfall	Singles match	9:52
6	Gigi Dolin and Jacy Jayne (Note: Both Dolin and Jayne landed on the floor at the same time with two referees supporting Dolin and Jayne respectively. The head referee then decided that since there was not any clear winner, both women had won the match.) co-won the match by last eliminating each other (Note: Order of elimination: Cora Jade, Tatum Paxley, Amari Miller, Valentina Feroz, Lash Legend, Kiana James, Dani Palmer, Ivy Nile, Indi Hartwell, Thea Hail, Fallon Henley, Elektra Lopez, Wendy Choo, Nikkita Lyons, Zoey Stark, Sol Ruca, Alba Fyre, Lyra Valkyria)	20-woman Battle Royal to determine the #1 contender to the NXT Women's Championship at NXT Vengeance Day	13:17
(c) / – the champion(s) heading into the match

=== Gauntlet match ===
Eliminated	Wrestler	Team	Entered	Eliminated by	Method of elimination	Times
1	Jimmy Jackson	"The Rockers" (Jimmy Jackson and Brian Williams)	2	Pretty Deadly (Kit Wilson and Elton Prince)	Pinned after Spilt Milk	0:30
2	Malik Blade	Malik Blade and Edris Enofé	3	Pretty Deadly (Kit Wilson and Elton Prince)	Pinned with a roll-up	8:25
3	Elton Prince	Pretty Deadly (Kit Wilson and Elton Prince)	1	Gallus (Mark Coffey and Wolfgang)	Pinned after an enzuigiri/body slam combo	9:36
Winners	Gallus (Mark Coffey and Wolfgang)		4	—N/a		9:36
