= NXT Deadline (2024) =

WWE premium live event

- Promotional poster featuring Je'Von Evans, Zaria, Giulia, Ethan Page, Stephanie Vaquer, and Trick Williams
- Promotion: WWE
- Brand: NXT
- Date: December 7, 2024
- City: Minneapolis, Minnesota
- Venue: Minneapolis Armory
- Attendance: 2,000

WWE event chronology
← Previous; Survivor Series: WarGames	Next → Saturday Night's Main Event XXXVII

NXT Deadline chronology
← Previous; 2023	Next → 2025

NXT major events chronology
← Previous; Halloween Havoc	Next → Vengeance Day

The 2024 NXT Deadline (stylized as DEADL1NE) was a professional wrestling premium live event (PLE) produced by WWE, held exclusively for wrestlers from the promotion's developmental brand, NXT. It was the third annual Deadline and took place on Saturday, December 7, 2024, at the Minneapolis Armory in Minneapolis, Minnesota. The event was based around the Iron Survivor Challenge for both the men and women, a 25-minute five-person match in which a wrestler attempts to score the most falls before the deadline in order to win and earn a match for the NXT Championship and NXT Women's Championship, respectively, at NXT: New Year's Evil.

This was WWE's first PLE in Minneapolis since TLC: Tables, Ladders & Chairs in 2019. It was also NXT's first PLE to livestream on Netflix in Brazil, Chile, Spain, and New Zealand, which moved to the platform on November 1. This was also WWE's last PLE to air on Disney+ Hotstar in Indonesia, Binge in Australia, and the standalone WWE Network in most other international markets as WWE's content in those areas moved to Netflix in January 2025, and it was also the last Deadline to air on SonyLIV in India before India moved to Netflix in April 2025.

Five matches were contested at the event. In the main event, Giulia won the women's Iron Survivor Challenge, while Oba Femi won the men's Iron Survivor Challenge in the opening bout. In other prominent matches, Lola Vice defeated Jaida Parker in a NXT Underground match, and Trick Williams defeated Ridge Holland to retain the NXT Championship.

The event received mostly positive reviews from fans and critics alike with both of the Iron Survivor Challenges receiving universal acclaim, but although with direct criticism geared towards the NXT Championship match.

== Production ==
=== Background ===
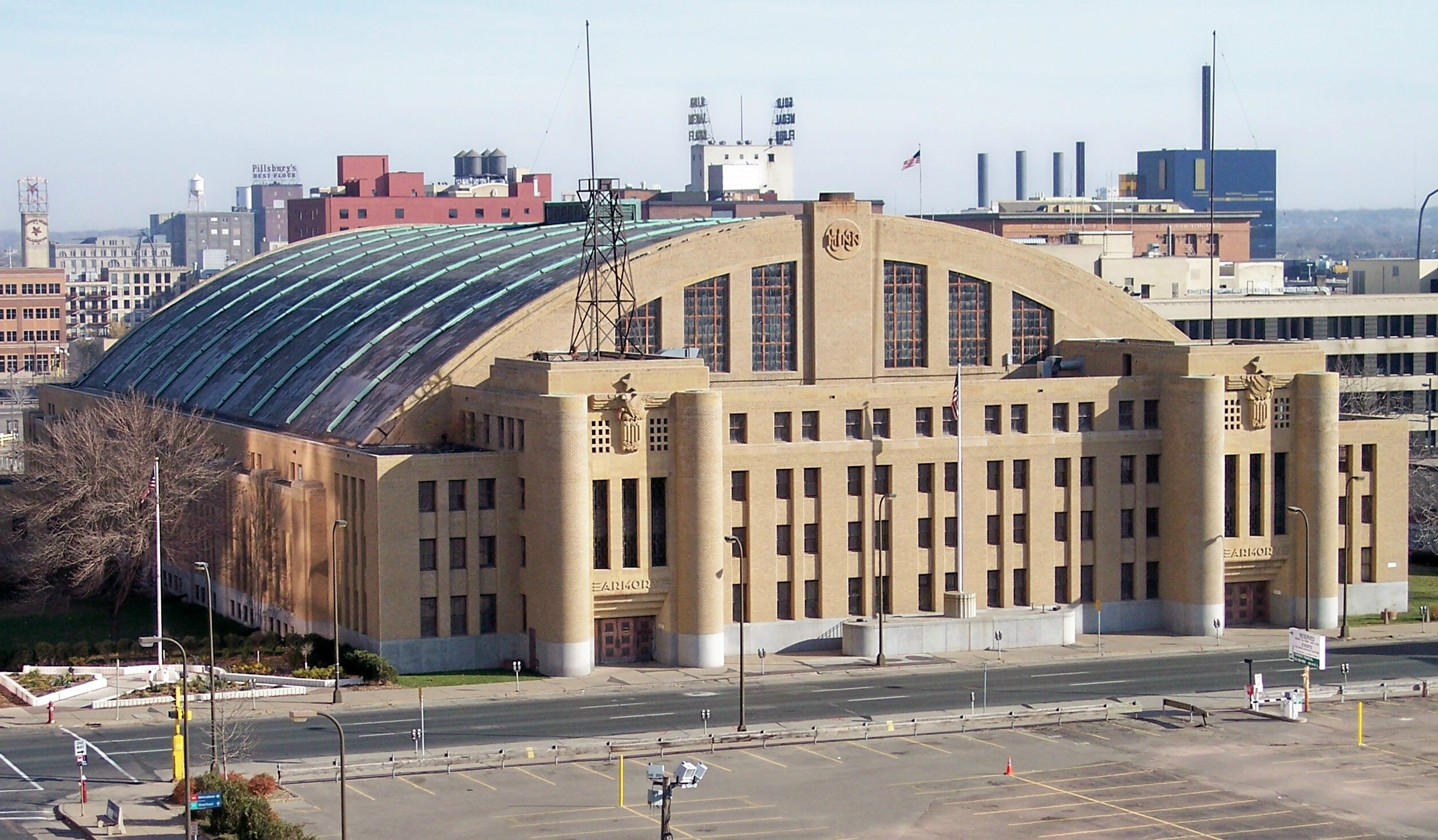
The third annual Deadline was held at the Minneapolis Armory in Minneapolis, Minnesota, which was WWE's first premium live event in Minneapolis since TLC: Tables, Ladders & Chairs in 2019.

Deadline is an annual professional wrestling premium live event (PLE) held in December by the American promotion WWE for its developmental brand, NXT, since 2022. The event is based around the Iron Survivor Challenge for both the men and women, which is a five-person match in which a wrestler attempts to score the most falls before the 25-minute time limit (the "deadline") expires to earn a future match for the NXT Championship and NXT Women's Championship, respectively.

On November 6, 2024, at NXT: 2300, WWE announced that the third Deadline would be held on Saturday, December 7, 2024, at the Minneapolis Armory in Minneapolis, Minnesota. This marked was WWE's first PLE to be held in Minneapolis since TLC: Tables, Ladders & Chairs in 2019.

=== Broadcast outlets ===
The PLE was broadcast on WWE's livestreaming platforms. These included Peacock in the United States, SonyLIV in India, Disney+ Hotstar in Indonesia, Disney+ in the Philippines, Binge in Australia, Abema in Japan, Netflix in Brazil, Chile, Spain, and New Zealand, and the WWE Network everywhere else. This was NXT's first PLE to air on Netflix in those specified countries, which moved to the platform on November 1.

Following an announcement made on January 23, this was WWE's final PLE to air on the standalone WWE Network in most international markets where it was still available, as well as Disney+ Hotstar and Binge, as its content moved to Netflix in January 2025; a select few territories maintained the standalone WWE Network until early 2026 due to pre-existing contracts before they also merged under Netflix when those contracts expired.

=== Storylines ===
The event comprised five matches that resulted from scripted storylines. Results were predetermined by WWE's writers on the NXT brand, while storylines were produced on WWE's weekly television program, NXT, and the supplementary online streaming show, Level Up.

On November 6 during NXT: 2300, NXT General Manager Ava announced the return of Deadline. Qualifiers for both the men's and women's Iron Survivor Challenges started on the November 12 episode. The first two men's spots were determined by two matches where Wes Lee and Je'Von Evans defeated Cedric Alexander and Lexis King, respectively, while the first women's spot was determined by a match where Sol Ruca defeated Cora Jade. The next spots were determined on the November 19 episode. For the men's match, Nathan Frazer defeated Eddy Thorpe, while the second and third women's spots were earned by Stephanie Vaquer and Zaria, defeating OTM's Jaida Parker and No Quarter Catch Crew's Wren Sinclair, respectively. The fourth spots for both the men's and women's matches were determined on the November 26 episode, with Ethan Page defeating Axiom and Giulia defeating Kelani Jordan. The last spots for both matches were determined on the December 3 episode in two Last Chance matches, with Thorpe defeating Alexander, King, and Axiom, and Sinclair defeating Jade, Parker, and Jordan. However, backstage later in the night, Thorpe was attacked by a mysterious person. On the day of the event, it was announced that Thorpe was not medically cleared with a replacement taking his spot.

On the August 13 episode of NXT, Chase University (Andre Chase and Ridge Holland) defeated Axiom and Nathan Frazer to win the NXT Tag Team Championship, only to lose the title back to them 19 days later at No Mercy. After the match, Holland viciously attacked Chase, reverting back to a heel in the process. This led to an Ambulance match between Chase and Holland at Halloween Havoc, which Holland won. Later that night, Trick Williams successfully defended the NXT Championship against Ethan Page. After the match, Williams was viciously attacked by both Page and Holland until WWE Hall of Famer Bubba Ray Dudley, who had been confronted by Holland on the pre-show, came out to save Williams. At NXT: 2300 on November 6, Page and Holland defeated Dudley and Williams, with Holland pinning Williams. The following week, Williams called out Holland, but was interrupted by Chase, stating that he had unfinished business with Holland. After Holland came to the ring, Chase challenged Holland to a match, where if Chase lost, Chase University would disband. After initially refusing, Holland changed his mind and accepted after Williams added the stipulation that the winner would challenge him for the NXT Championship at Deadline. The match was then made official for the following week, which Holland won, forcing Chase University to disband and making the title match official for Deadline.

On the November 12 episode of NXT, NXT General Manager Ava met with several NXT tag teams, stating that she wanted a team to challenge Nathan Frazer and Axiom for the NXT Tag Team Championship. During subsequent episodes, various NXT tag teams brawled with each other, coming to a head on the November 26 episode, where Ava announced that on the following episode, a battle royal would be held, with the winning team earning a match for the NXT Tag Team Championship at Deadline. The match was won by No Quarter Catch Crew (Myles Borne and Tavion Heights).

Through September 2024, Jaida Parker and Lola Vice had feuded with Fatal Influence (Jacy Jayne, Fallon Henley, and Jazmyn Nyx) while simultaneously feuding with each other. The two agreed to put their differences aside to team up against Jayne and Henley for NXT's October 1 premiere on The CW, which they lost after Parker walked out on Vice. After a backstage brawl, NXT General Manager Ava announced that Parker and Vice would face each other in a Hardcore match at NXT: 2300, with former Extreme Championship Wrestling manager Dawn Marie serving as the special guest referee. There, Parker defeated Vice after hitting her with a brick. On the November 19 episode, Parker lost her Iron Survivor qualifying match after interference from Vice. On the next episode, Vice challenged Parker to an NXT Underground match. On the December 3 episode, Parker competed in a Last Chance fatal four-way match for the final spot in the Iron Survivor Challenge, but failed to win after interference from Vice as a brawl ensued between the two. Parker subsequently accepted the challenge for the NXT Underground match, wanting the match to take place on that's night episode. However, Ava scheduled the match for Deadline.

== Event ==
Other on-screen personnel
Role:	Name:
Commentators	Vic Joseph
Commentators	Booker T
Spanish commentators	Marcelo Rodríguez
Spanish commentators	Jerry Soto
Ring announcer	Mike Rome
Referees	Adrian Butler
Referees	Chip Danning
Referees	Dallas Irvin
Referees	Derek Sanders
Referees	Felix Fernandez
Interviewer	Sarah Schreiber
Pre-show panel	Megan Morant
Pre-show panel	Sam Roberts

=== Preliminary matches ===
The PLE began with the men's Iron Survivor Challenge. Je'Von Evans and Wes Lee began the match. Lee pinned Evans with a roll-up while using the ropes for leverage to score the first point. Nathan Frazer entered third, and performed a Frog Splash on Lee for a nearfall. Ethan Page entered fourth. Frazer pinned Page with a small package to score his first point. Page then exited the penalty box and pinned Frazer with a schoolboy to score his first point. The final entrant was Oba Femi, who was filling in for the injured Eddy Thorpe. Femi pinned Evans with a European Uppercut when Evans leapt off the top rope and attempted another pin, but Page pulled the referee out of the ring. Femi slammed Page into the front of the penalty box before being Frazer shoved Femi into the ring post. Evans performed a Springboard Cutter on Lee to score his first point. After Lee exited the penalty box, Femi performed a powerbomb on Evans, but Page pinned Femi with a schoolboy to score his first point. Evans pinned Page with a crucifix to score his second point. Page entered the penalty box, where Femi attacked him until he exited. Femi performed chokeslams on Lee and Frazer and pinned both men to score three points. Evans performed a Springboard Cutter on Femi, but the time expired afterwards, meaning Femi won the match.

In the second match, Lola Vice took on Jaida Parker in an NXT Underground match. During the match, Parker attacked Vice's belt to her wrist and sent Vice into the ring post. Parker then performed a Samoan Drop on Vice. Parker grabbed a brick, but Vice performed a kick on Parker and applied a rear-naked choke. Vice performed a suplex on Parker and went for the brick, but Parker performed a suplex on Vice. As Parker went for the brick, Vice performed a backfist and applied the Anaconda Vice on Parker, who passed out, thus Vice won the match.

After that, Nathan Frazer and Axiom defended the NXT Tag Team Championship against Tavion Heights and Myles Borne. During the match, Bronco Nima and Lucien Price showed up at ringside. Heights performed a belly-to-belly suplex on Frazer onto Nima and Price, who were then ejected from ringside. Frazer performed a 450 splash on Heights for a nearfall. Axiom performed a Spanish Fly on Borne followed by a Phoenix Splash by Frazer, but Heights broke up the pin. In the end, Axiom performed a destroyer on Heights and pinned Borne with an inside cradle to retain the title.

In the penultimate match, Trick Williams defended the NXT Championship against Ridge Holland. During the match, Holland attempted a top-rope splash, but Williams moved out of the way and performed a spin kick for a nearfall. Williams ended up getting his head stuck between the top and middle ropes until he was freed by referees. In the end, Holland performed a DDT on Williams for a nearfall. Holland attempted a destroyer, but Williams countered it into a roll-up for a nearfall. Williams then performed the Trick Kick and the Trick Shot to retain the title.

=== Main event ===
The main event was the women's Iron Survivor Challenge. Giulia and Wren Sinclair started the match. Sol Ruca entered third. Giulia performed a Northern Lights Bomb on Sinclair to score her first point. Zaria entered fourth. Ruca performed the Sol Snatcher on Zaria for a nearfall and on Sinclair to score her first point. Afterwards, Ruca and Giulia powerbombed Zaria through the announce table. The final entrant was Stephanie Vaquer. Zaria pinned Giulia with an F-6 to score her first point. Vaquer pinned Sinclair with a victory roll to score her first point. Upon leaving the penalty box, Sinclair pinned Ruca with a roll-up to score her first point. In the end, Giulia pinned Zaria following a knee strike to bring herself in the lead with two points. Vaquer attempted two pinning combinations on Giulia before the time expired, meaning Giulia won the match.

== Reception ==
Jason Powell of Pro Wrestling Dot Net stated that Deadline "was more of a solid double than a home run. The tag team title match was a lot of fun, and the ISC matches were both entertaining". For the women's Iron Survivor Challenge, drama was created "by having everyone tied at one until the closing seconds of the match". For the men's Iron Survivor Challenge, Powell called it "a good match with a clever finish", and fans hoped "for Penta El Zero Miedo or maybe a TNA crossover, but Femi fit the description of a "suitable replacement" for Eddy Thorpe".

Kelly Wells of Pro Wrestling Torch called the men's Iron Survivor Challenge "very strong work", and the NXT Tag Team Championship match "a smartly-constructed match, as there were more than enough spots to make it seem like this is where it finally ends, all leading to another successful defense". The women's Iron Survivor Challenge made up for the men's "with impact and a lot of very strong technical wrestling, and the work was clean all the way through the significant runtime". Wells assumed that WWE "did a pretty decent job of holding off on Giulia's inevitable championship win as long as they could, building anticipation for the title win at NXT: New Year's Evil and likely a showdown with Vaquer at Stand & Deliver a few months later". Wells concluded that Deadline "was a strong, enjoyable show with no fat that needed to be cut, and pieces are in place for the near future on weekly TV and beyond", and gave it "an easy thumbs up".

== Aftermath ==
In addition to the majority of countries moving to Netflix in January 2025, this would also be WWE's final PLE to air on SonyLIV in India following the expiration of WWE's contract with SonyLIV with India then moving to Netflix on April 1, 2025.

== Results ==
No.	Results	Stipulations	Times
1	Oba Femi (Note: Replaced Thorpe.) (3) defeated Wes Lee (1), Je'Von Evans (2), Nathan Frazer (1), and Ethan Page (2)	Men's Iron Survivor Challenge to determine the #1 contender for the NXT Championship at NXT: New Year's Evil	25:00
2	Lola Vice defeated Jaida Parker by technical submission	NXT Underground match	11:05
3	Nathan Frazer and Axiom (c) defeated No Quarter Catch Crew (Myles Borne and Tavion Heights) by pinfall	Tag team match for the NXT Tag Team Championship	15:30
4	Trick Williams (c) defeated Ridge Holland by pinfall	Singles match for the NXT Championship	15:50
5	Giulia (2) defeated Sol Ruca (1), Stephanie Vaquer (1), Zaria (1), and Wren Sinclair (1)	Women's Iron Survivor Challenge to determine the #1 contender for the NXT Women's Championship at NXT: New Year's Evil	25:00
(c) / – the champion(s) heading into the match

=== Men's Iron Survivor Challenge statistics ===
- Entry Order: Je'Von Evans, Wes Lee, Nathan Frazer, Ethan Page, and Oba Femi

Score					Point winner	Fall loser	Decision	Notes	Time
Lee	Evans	Page	Frazer	Femi	Point winner	Fall loser	Decision	Notes	Time
1	0	0	0	0	Wes Lee	Je'Von Evans	Pinfall	Pinned with a roll-up with his feet on the ropes	4:51
1	0	0	1	0	Nathan Frazer	Ethan Page	Pinfall	Pinned with a small package	10:35
1	0	1	1	0	Ethan Page	Nathan Frazer	Pinfall	Pinned with a schoolboy	12:39
1	0	1	1	1	Oba Femi	Je'Von Evans	Pinfall	Pinned after a European uppercut	16:13
1	1	1	1	1	Je'Von Evans	Wes Lee	Pinfall	Pinned after the OG Cutter	18:38
1	1	2	1	1	Ethan Page	Oba Femi	Pinfall	Pinned with a schoolboy	21:14
1	2	2	1	1	Je'Von Evans	Ethan Page	Pinfall	Pinned with a crucifix	21:47
1	2	2	1	3	Oba Femi	Nathan Frazer	Pinfall	Pinned after a double chokeslam	24:47 (Note: Femi simultaneously pinned both Frazer and Lee at the same time, putting one arm over each.)
1	2	2	1	3	Oba Femi	Wes Lee	Pinfall	Pinned after a double chokeslam	24:47
Winner					Oba Femi	—N/a			25:00

=== Women's Iron Survivor Challenge statistics ===
- Entry Order: Giulia, Wren Sinclair, Sol Ruca, Zaria, and Stephanie Vaquer

Score					Point winner	Fall loser	Decision	Notes	Time
Giulia	Vaquer	Zaria	Ruca	Sinclair	Point winner	Fall loser	Decision	Notes	Time
1	0	0	0	0	Giulia	Wren Sinclair	Pinfall	Pinned after a Northern Lights Bomb	09:47
1	0	0	1	0	Sol Ruca	Wren Sinclair	Pinfall	Pinned after the Sol Snatcher	11:37
1	0	1	1	0	Zaria	Giulia	Pinfall	Pinned after the F-6	17:41
1	1	1	1	0	Stephanie Vaquer	Wren Sinclair	Pinfall	Pinned with a victory roll	22:35
1	1	1	1	1	Wren Sinclair	Sol Ruca	Pinfall	Pinned with a sunset flip	24:20
2	1	1	1	1	Giulia	Zaria	Pinfall	Pinned after the Arrivederci	24:51
Winner					Giulia	—N/a			25:00
