= NXT Vengeance Day (2025) =

WWE premium live event

- Promotional poster featuring Giulia, Oba Femi, Stephanie Vaquer, Je'Von Evans, and Tony D'Angelo
- Promotion: WWE
- Brand: NXT
- Date: February 15, 2025
- City: Washington, D.C.
- Venue: CareFirst Arena
- Attendance: 3,849

WWE event chronology
| ← Previous; Royal Rumble | Next → Elimination Chamber |

Vengeance Day chronology
| ← Previous; 2024 | Next → 2026 |

NXT major events chronology
| ← Previous; Deadline | Next → Stand & Deliver |

The 2025 NXT Vengeance Day was a professional wrestling premium live event (PLE) produced by WWE, held for wrestlers from the promotion's developmental brand, NXT. It was NXT's fifth annual Vengeance Day and WWE's 13th Vengeance overall. The event took place on Saturday, February 15, 2025, at the CareFirst Arena in Washington, D.C.

This was the first Vengeance, as well as NXT's first PLE, to livestream on Netflix in most markets outside the United States following the merger of the WWE Network under Netflix in those areas. It was also NXT's final PLE to livestream on SonyLIV in India due to its content moving to Netflix on April 1. This would also be the final Vengeance to livestream on Disney+ in the Philippines, which moved to Netflix on January 1, 2026.

Six matches were contested at the event. While primarily held for NXT, some wrestlers from WWE's main roster brand, Raw, also performed. In the main event, Giulia defeated Roxanne Perez, Cora Jade, and Raw's Bayley in a fatal four-way match to retain the NXT Women's Championship. In other prominent matches, Oba Femi defeated Austin Theory and Grayson Waller, both from Raw, in a triple threat match to retain the NXT Championship, Ethan Page defeated Je'Von Evans, and in the opening bout, Stephanie Vaquer defeated Fallon Henley to win the NXT Women's North American Championship. The event also marked the debut of DarkState (Dion Lennox, Cutler James, Saquon Shugars, and Osiris Griffin), as well as Jordynne Grace's first appearance in NXT as an official member of the NXT roster.

== Production ==
=== Background ===
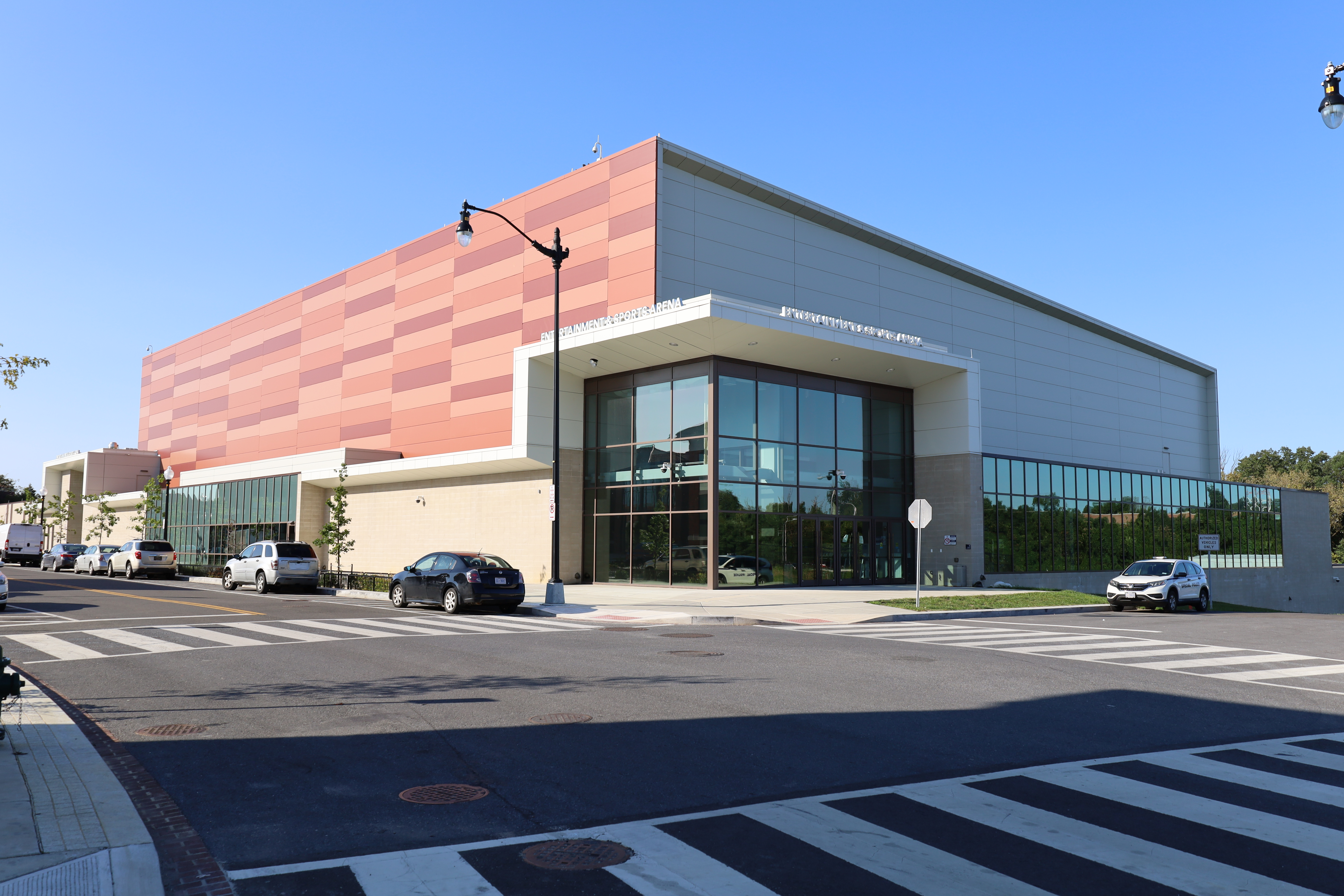
NXT's fifth annual Vengeance Day, and WWE's 13th Vengeance overall, was held at the CareFirst Arena in Washington, D.C.

Vengeance was originally established as a professional wrestling pay-per-view (PPV) event for WWE in 2001 and it was held annually until 2007, followed by one event in 2011. Since its revival in 2021, it has been held annually in February for WWE's developmental brand, NXT, under the title Vengeance Day, a reference to the event taking place on or around Valentine's Day. On January 7, 2025, NXT's fifth Vengeance Day, and WWE's 13th Vengeance overall, was announced to be held on Saturday, February 15, 2025, at the Entertainment and Sports Arena in Washington, D.C., which was renamed to CareFirst Arena on February 6, just nine days before the event was held. Beginning with Halloween Havoc in 2024, all major NXT events were branded solely with the WWE logo instead of the NXT logo, marking the first Vengeance Day event to just use the promotion's logo, as well as the first Vengeance to do so since the 2011 event.

=== Broadcast outlets ===
The PLE was broadcast on WWE's livestreaming platforms. These included Peacock in the United States, SonyLIV in India, Disney+ in the Philippines, SuperSport in Sub-Saharan Africa, Abema in Japan, Netflix in most other international markets, and the WWE Network in a select few countries that had not yet transferred to Netflix due to pre-existing contracts. This marked the first Vengeance, as well as NXT's first PLE, to livestream on Netflix following the WWE Network's merger under the service in January 2025 in those areas.

=== Storylines ===
The event included six matches that resulted from scripted storylines. Results were predetermined by WWE's writers on the NXT brand, while storylines were produced on WWE's weekly television program, NXT.

On the January 28 episode of NXT, Raw's A-Town Down Under (Austin Theory and Grayson Waller) hosted a special edition of The Grayson Waller Effect with the new NXT Champion Oba Femi as guest. Theory and Waller said they appeared to see if Femi was "worth the hype". Femi retaliated and said he had accomplished more in a shorter amount of time than both Theory and Waller combined. Afterwards, Femi declared that he would defend the title against either of the two at Vengeance Day. NXT General Manager Ava took issue with Femi declaring his opponents, but announced a triple threat match against both Theory and Waller for Vengeance Day.

At NXT: New Year's Evil, Giulia defeated Roxanne Perez to win the NXT Women's Championship. One week later, Perez addressed the fans, seemingly to announce her departure from NXT before being interrupted by SmackDown's Bayley, who tried giving Perez advice to no avail. A brawl ensued between the two women as the show went off the air. During this time, Bayley had been transferred to the Raw brand as part of WWE's transfer window. Bayley appeared on NXT the following week to show gratitude to the fans before being interrupted by Giulia, who showed her respect to Bayley. Perez and her ally, Cora Jade, interrupted and insulted them as a brawl ensued between the two teams. One week later, the two teams faced each other in a tag team match, which Giulia and Bayley won after the latter pinned Jade. Later that night when NXT General Manager Ava was about to announce Giulia's Vengeance Day opponent, she was cut off by Perez and Jade, with Perez saying Bayley did not deserve a title shot since she did not get her title rematch yet, and stating that it was Jade's fault they lost the match earlier in the show. After that, Ava announced that Giulia would defend the title against both Bayley and Perez in a triple threat match at Vengeance Day, much to Jade's dismay. A week later, Jade attacked both Giulia and Bayley, and tried to hit Perez. This led to a match between Bayley and Jade on the February 11 episode, where Jade defeated Bayley after interference from Perez, who wore Bayley's previous "hugger" gimmick from 2015 to 2019. After the match, Ava announced that the NXT Women's Championship match would instead be a fatal four-way match between Giulia, Bayley, Perez, and Jade.

At NXT: New Year's Evil, Stephanie Vaquer won a fatal four-way match to become the #1 contender for the NXT Women's North American Championship, held by Fallon Henley. Later that night, however, Shotzi pinned Henley in a six-woman tag team match. Shotzi and Vaquer argued over who should get the match first. A match between the two was scheduled for the following week, which Shotzi won after interference from Henley and her Fatal Influence stablemates, Jacy Jayne and Jazmyn Nyx. Two weeks later, Henley defeated Shotzi to retain the title. After the match, Vaquer confronted Henley, and it was announced that Henley would defend the title against Vaquer at Vengeance Day.

Ever since losing the NXT Championship and a NXT North American Championship match in 2024, Ethan Page went into an emotional turmoil and became depressed. On the December 17 episode of NXT, Page came to the ring stating that he deserved all the hate he was getting from the fans and that he had lost his smile. Afterwards, he was interrupted by Je'Von Evans, who praised him and said that Page deserved to be where he was now. Page said Evans was right and that he should not worry about losing his smile, but rather take away Evans's smile, prompting Page to attack Evans, crushing his jaw with a steel chair. Two weeks later, Page defeated Evans's tag team partner Cedric Alexander and crushed Alexander's hand with a toolbox. On the January 14 episode, Page defeated Dante Chen and crushed Chen's leg with the steel steps. Evans returned to attack Page but was knocked down by Page punching his injured jaw. On the February 4 episode, NXT General Manager Ava decided to suspend Evans so that he would not end up getting more injured, but Page said that Evans should be "punished" by facing him. Ava then stated that they could face each other at Vengeance Day, but only if Evans was medically cleared. On the next episode, Evans was cleared to compete, but Ava made him sign a waiver that WWE would not be responsible for any damage to Evans. After signing the term, Ava reluctantly made the match official.

In July 2024, it was announced that Josh Briggs would be one of two NXT representatives (the other being No Quarter Catch Crew's Tavion Heights) to enter Pro Wrestling Noah's N-1 Victory tournament. After his excursion to Noah, Briggs formed a tag team with Noah's Yoshiki Inamura, who Briggs defeated during his time at Noah, and they set their sights on Axiom and Nathan Frazer's NXT Tag Team Championship. On the February 4 episode of NXT, Frazer told Briggs and Inamura to find someone to beat to prove they deserved a title shot. Briggs challenged Hank Waller and Tank Ledger while Inamura challenged No Quarter Catch Crew (Heights and Myles Borne), which prompted NXT General Manager Ava to schedule a triple threat tag team match for the next episode. After Briggs and Inamura won the match, Axiom and Frazer announced that they would defend the title against Briggs and Inamura at Vengeance Day.

On the December 3, 2024, episode of NXT, Eddy Thorpe won a fatal four-way last chance match to qualify for the Iron Survivor Challenge at Deadline. However, he was later found attacked backstage and was ruled out for Deadline. Two days after Deadline on the December 10 episode of NXT, Thorpe confronted NXT Champion Trick Williams and demanded a title shot, which Williams agreed. Upon signing the title match contract, Thorpe revealed to NXT General Manager Ava that he staged his own attack to ease his way into an NXT Championship match, turning heel in the process. The title match the following week ended in a double pinfall and Williams retained his title. At NXT: New Year's Evil on January 7, Williams defended his NXT Championship in a triple threat match against Thorpe and the Iron Survivor Challenge winner Oba Femi, where Femi won to become the new NXT Champion. On the February 4 episode of NXT, Femi and Williams lost to Raw's A-Town Down Under (Austin Theory and Grayson Waller) in a tag team match after Thorpe whipped Williams with a leather strap behind the referee's back. After the match, Thorpe continued to brutally whip Williams. The following week, Thorpe challenged Williams to a strap match at Vengeance Day, which was accepted by Williams.

== Event ==
Other on-screen personnel
| Role: | Name: |
|---|---|
| Commentators | Vic Joseph |
| Commentators | Corey Graves |
| Commentators | Booker T |
| Spanish commentators | Marcelo Rodríguez |
| Spanish commentators | Jerry Soto |
| Ring announcer | Mike Rome |
| Referees | Adrian Butler |
| Referees | Chip Danning |
| Referees | Dallas Irvin |
| Referees | Derek Sanders |
| Referees | Felix Fernandez |
| Interviewer | Sarah Schreiber |
| Pre-show panel | Megan Morant |
| Pre-show panel | Sam Roberts |

=== Preliminary matches ===
The PLE began with Fallon Henley (accompanied by Jacy Jayne and Jazmyn Nyx) defending the NXT Women's North American Championship against Stephanie Vaquer. In the climax, Vaquer performed an Implant Buster on Henley on the apron followed by a crossbody on Henley, Jayne, and Nyx outside the ring. Back inside, Vaquer performed a corkscrew moonsault on Henley to win the title.

In the second match, Nathan Frazer and Axiom defended the NXT Tag Team Championship against Josh Briggs and Yoshiki Inamura. Inamura performed a Death Valley Driver on Axiom onto Frazer for a nearfall. As Briggs had Frazer in a choke, Axiom broke it up with an Asai Moonsault. Frazer and Axiom then performed a modified Total Elimination on Inamura to retain the title. After the match, the teams shared respectful handshakes, but were attacked by Dion Lennox, Cutler James, Saquon Shugars, and Osiris Griffin, who would later be known as DarkState.

After that, Trick Williams took on Eddy Thorpe in a strap match. In the climax, Thorpe rolled out of the ring to avoid getting pinned after the Trick Shot. Thorpe yanked the strap for a low blow on Williams before performing the Knee Plus on Williams to win the match.

In the fourth match, Ethan Page took on Je'Von Evans. After an even match, Evans attempted a springboard, but Page knocked him out with a right hook and pinned him following the Twist of Fate to win the match.

The penultimate match saw Oba Femi defend the NXT Championship against Austin Theory and Grayson Waller in a triple threat match. Throughout the match, Theory and Waller worked together in an attempt to defeat Femi. Waller performed an elbow drop on Femi through a table, and Theory pinned Femi inside the ring for a nearfall. In the climax, Theory had Femi pinned following a DDT and A-Town Down, but Waller pulled the referee out of the ring. Waller attempted a stunner on Femi, who moved out of the way so that Theory received the move. Femi then pinned Waller following Fall from Grace to retain the title. After the match, Dion Lennox, Cutler James, Saquon Shugars, and Osiris Griffin attacked Femi and laid him out with a powerbomb.

=== Main event ===
In the main event, Giulia defended the NXT Women's Championship against Roxanne Perez, Bayley, and Cora Jade in a fatal four-way match. This was a back-and-forth match between the women. After Perez performed Pop Rox on Bayley twice, the first outside the ring and the second inside, Jade rolled up Perez for a nearfall. Jade performed a DDT on Perez, but Giulia performed a running knee strike on Jade. Giulia then performed a running knee strike and the Northern Lights Bomb on Perez to retain the title. After the match, NXT Women's North American Champion Stephanie Vaquer appeared and confronted Giulia. Jordynne Grace then joined the confrontation as the event ended.

== Aftermath ==
Following Stephanie Vaquer's successful NXT Women's North American Championship defense on the February 25 episode of NXT, she was confronted by NXT Women's Champion Giulia, who said that Vaquer called herself the best champion, but Giulia claimed that she was better. Giulia said that although she was Vaquer's friend, she wanted to challenge her to a Winner Takes All match for both titles, and it was subsequently scheduled for Roadblock.

After more confrontations between Ethan Page and Je'Von Evans, they faced each other in a tag team match on the February 25 episode of NXT, where Evans's team won. On March 4, it was announced that a New York City street fight between Evans and Page was scheduled for Roadblock.

Following their confrontation at Vengeance Day and on the February 25 episode of NXT, a match between Roxanne Perez and Jordynne Grace was scheduled for Roadblock.

=== Broadcasting changes ===
In continuing WWE's near worldwide transition to Netflix, this would be NXT's final PLE to air on SonyLIV in India before migrating to Netflix on April 1. This would also be the final Vengeance to air on Disney+ in the Philippines before moving to Netflix on January 1, 2026. Throughout 2025, many of the select few countries that were still on the WWE Network due to pre-existing contracts gradually merged to Netflix with nearly all international markets on Netflix by January 1, 2026.

== Results ==
| No. | Results | Stipulations | Times |
|---|---|---|---|
| 1 | Stephanie Vaquer defeated Fallon Henley (c) (with Jacy Jayne and Jazmyn Nyx) by pinfall | Singles match for the NXT Women's North American Championship | 15:01 |
| 2 | Nathan Frazer and Axiom (c) defeated Josh Briggs and Yoshiki Inamura by pinfall | Tag team match for the NXT Tag Team Championship | 10:24 |
| 3 | Eddy Thorpe defeated Trick Williams by pinfall | Strap match | 10:58 |
| 4 | Ethan Page defeated Je'Von Evans by pinfall | Singles match | 12:00 |
| 5 | Oba Femi (c) defeated Austin Theory and Grayson Waller by pinfall | Triple threat match for the NXT Championship | 13:12 |
| 6 | Giulia (c) defeated Bayley, Roxanne Perez, and Cora Jade by pinfall | Fatal four-way match for the NXT Women's Championship | 18:31 |
(c) / – the champion(s) heading into the match
