= NXT Breakout Tournament =

Professional wrestling tournament in WWE

- Promotions: WWE
- Brands: NXT
- First event: 2019
- Last event: 2024

The NXT Breakout Tournament is a professional wrestling single elimination tournament produced by professional wrestling promotion WWE for the NXT brand. It was first introduced in 2019 and features eight wrestlers who are new arrivals on NXT (usually WWE Performance Center recruits making their WWE NXT television debuts). The winner receives a championship match of their choice, which they can cash in at any time.

== Winners, dates and venues of finals ==
Year	Winner	Finals			
Year	Winner	Event	Date	Venue	City
2019	Jordan Myles	NXT	August 10, 2019	Scotiabank Arena	Toronto, Ontario, Canada
2021	Carmelo Hayes	NXT	August 23, 2021	WWE Performance Center	Orlando, Florida
2022	Roxanne Perez	NXT	June 7, 2022	WWE Performance Center	Orlando, Florida
2023	Lola Vice	Halloween Havoc	October 31, 2023	WWE Performance Center	Orlando, Florida
2024	Oba Femi	New Year's Evil	January 2, 2024	WWE Performance Center	Orlando, Florida

=== NXT Breakout Tournament winner's championship opportunity ===
Color key

Won championship match
Lost championship match

==== Male ====
No.	Winner	Event	Date	Championship match
1	Jordan Myles	NXT	August 15, 2019	Myles lost to Adam Cole for the NXT Championship.
2	Carmelo Hayes	NXT	October 12, 2021	Hayes cashed in after Isaiah "Swerve" Scott retained the NXT North American Championship against Santos Escobar.
3	Oba Femi	NXT	January 9, 2024	Femi cashed in after Dragon Lee retained the NXT North American Championship against Lexis King.

==== Female ====
No.	Winner	Event	Date	Championship match
1	Roxanne Perez	NXT	July 12, 2022	Perez lost to Mandy Rose for the NXT Women's Championship.
2	Lola Vice	Vengeance Day	February 4, 2024	Vice cashed in during a singles match between the defending champion Lyra Valkyria and Roxanne Perez for the NXT Women's Championship, thus converting it into a triple threat match.

== Tournament history ==
=== 2019 ===
In 2019, WWE introduced the NXT Breakout Tournament, featuring eight male wrestlers from the WWE Performance Center making their NXT television debuts. Jordan Myles won the tournament by defeating Cameron Grimes in the final.

Tournament bracket

1st Round; NXT; June 12, 2019 (Aired: June 26 – July 17)
Dexter Lumis	5:52
Bronson Reed	Pinfall
Isaiah "Swerve" Scott	8:32
Cameron Grimes	Pinfall
Angel Garza	Pinfall
Joaquin Wilde	7:23
Jordan Myles	Pinfall
Boa	8:21

Semifinals; NXT; June 13, 2019 (Aired: July 24–31)
Bronson Reed	5:53
Cameron Grimes	Pinfall
Angel Garza	8:25
Jordan Myles	Pinfall

Final; NXT; August 10, 2019 (Aired: August 14)
Cameron Grimes	9:33
Jordan Myles	Pinfall

=== 2021 ===
After a one-year hiatus in 2020 due to the COVID-19 pandemic, the Breakout Tournament returned for a second edition in 2021, introducing eight new wrestlers from the Performance Center. Two qualifiers were held on the July 2 episode of 205 Live, where Andre Chase and Joe Gacy won by defeating Guru Raaj and Desmond Troy, respectively. Carmelo Hayes won the tournament by defeating Odyssey Jones in the final.

Tournament bracket

1st Round; NXT; July 13–21, 2021 (Aired: July 13 – August 3)
Duke Hudson	Pinfall
Ikemen Jiro	4:51
Carmelo Hayes	Pinfall
Josh Briggs	10:52
Andre Chase	3:20
Odyssey Jones	Pinfall
Joe Gacy	5:10
Trey Baxter	Pinfall

Semifinals; NXT; August 10–17
Duke Hudson	5:39
Carmelo Hayes	Pinfall
Odyssey Jones	Pinfall
Trey Baxter	2:54

Final; NXT; August 23, 2021 (Aired: August 24)
Carmelo Hayes	Pinfall
Odyssey Jones	8:50

=== 2022 ===
The inaugural Women's Breakout Tournament featured eight female wrestlers from NXT for the first time, with the winner earning a NXT Women's Championship opportunity at any time. Roxanne Perez became the first winner by defeating Tiffany Stratton in the final.

Tournament bracket

1st Round; NXT 2.0; May 10–17, 2022
Nikkita Lyons	Pinfall
Arianna Grace	3:09
Fallon Henley	Pinfall
Sloane Jacobs	4:28
Roxanne Perez	Pinfall
Kiana James	5:15
Lash Legend	Pinfall
Tatum Paxley	3:50

Semifinals; NXT 2.0; May 24, 2022
Tiffany Stratton (Note: Nikkita Lyons got injured during training. Her semifinal opponent, Fallon Henley, originally got a bye to the finals, but Tiffany Stratton challenged Henley to earn her spot in the finals. Thus, Stratton replaced Lyons in the tournament.)	Pinfall
Fallon Henley	5:02
Roxanne Perez	Pinfall
Lash Legend	3:19

Final; NXT 2.0; June 7, 2022
Tiffany Stratton	8:48
Roxanne Perez	Pinfall

=== 2023 Women's ===
The second Women's Breakout Tournament began on the October 3, 2023, episode of NXT. Lola Vice defeated Kelani Jordan in the final to win the tournament.

Tournament bracket

1st Round; NXT; October 3-17, 2023
Kelani Jordan	Pinfall
Izzi Dame	4:52
Arianna Grace	Pinfall
Brinley Reece (Note: Brinley Reece replaced Jakara Jackson after Jackson was not medically cleared to compete.)	2:56
Karmen Petrovic	Submission
Jaida Parker	3:38
Dani Palmer	3:59
Lola Vice	Pinfall

Semifinals; Halloween Havoc; October 24, 2023
Kelani Jordan	Pinfall
Arianna Grace	7:35
Karmen Petrovic	3:36
Lola Vice	Pinfall

Final; Halloween Havoc; October 31, 2023
Kelani Jordan	6:56
Lola Vice	Pinfall

=== 2023 Men's ===
The third Men's Breakout Tournament began on the December 12, 2023, episode of NXT. Oba Femi defeated Riley Osborne in the final to win the tournament.

Tournament bracket

1st round NXT; December 12-13, 2023 (Aired: December 12–19)
Riley Osborne	Pinfall
Keanu Carver	3:28
Lexis King (Note: Lexis King replaced Trey Bearhill after he attacked Bearhill with a steel chair.)	Pinfall
Dion Lennox	2:59
Oba Femi	Pinfall
Myles Borne	3:35
Tavion Heights	Pinfall
Luca Crusifino	3:25

Semifinals; NXT; December 13, 2023 (Aired: December 26)
Riley Osborne	Pinfall
Lexis King	3:43
Oba Femi	Pinfall
Tavion Heights	4:10

Final; New Year's Evil; January 2, 2024
Riley Osborne	9:45
Oba Femi	Pinfall
