= NXT: New Year's Evil (2024) =

WWE television special

- Promotion: WWE
- Brand: NXT
- Date: January 2, 2024
- City: Orlando, Florida
- Venue: WWE Performance Center

NXT special episodes chronology
← Previous; Halloween Havoc	Next → Roadblock

NXT: New Year's Evil chronology
← Previous; 2023	Next → 2025

The 2024 NXT: New Year's Evil was a professional wrestling television special produced by WWE, held exclusively for wrestlers from the promotion's developmental brand, NXT. It was WWE's fourth annual NXT: New Year's Evil, and the fifth New Year's Evil overall, and aired as a special episode of the weekly series NXT on the USA Network. The event took place on January 2, 2024, at NXT's home venue, the WWE Performance Center in Orlando, Florida for a fourth consecutive year.

This broadcast was part of WWE's week-long programming of New Year's-themed shows called New Year's Knockout Week, which included Raw: Day 1 on January 1 and SmackDown: New Year's Revolution on January 5. This episode also marked NXT's return to livestreaming on the WWE Network in the United Kingdom after previously airing on TNT Sports since January 2020. This would also be the last New Year's Evil to air on the USA Network, as NXT moved to The CW in October.

Six matches were contested during the live broadcast. In the main event, Trick Williams defeated SmackDown's Grayson Waller to retain his Iron Survivor Challenge title opportunity for the NXT Championship; Williams was originally scheduled to challenge champion Ilja Dragunov on the show, but due to Dragunov being injured, the match was postponed. In another prominent match, which opened the show, Lyra Valkyria defeated Blair Davenport to retain the NXT Women's Championship, which was Davenport's Iron Survivor Challenge title opportunity. This event was also notable for featuring Tiffany Stratton's final televised match in NXT, as she only appeared in a few segments before moving to the main roster on SmackDown the following month.

== Production ==
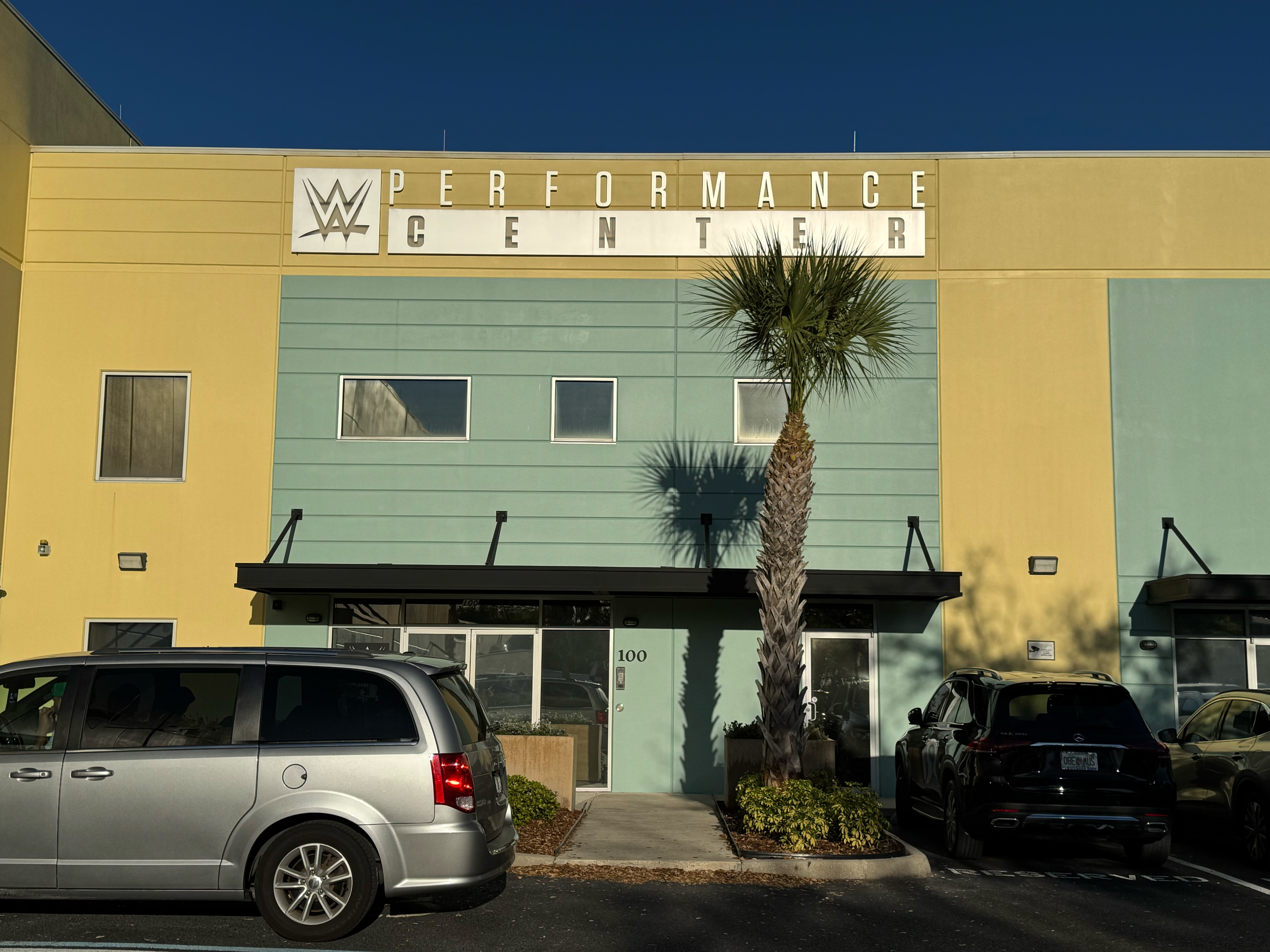
The fourth annual NXT: New Year's Evil, and fifth New Year's Evil overall, was held at NXT's home venue, the WWE Performance Center in Orlando, Florida for a fourth consecutive year.

=== Background ===
New Year's Evil is a professional wrestling television special held around New Year's. It was originally produced by the former World Championship Wrestling (WCW) as a special episode of its Monday Nitro program on December 27, 1999; this was the only New Year's Evil held by WCW, and then in March 2001, WCW was acquired by WWE, at the time still known as the World Wrestling Federation (WWF; renamed WWE in 2002). After 21 years since that WCW event, WWE reinstated New Year's Evil in 2021 for its developmental brand, NXT, becoming an annual special episode of NXT in early January.

During Deadline on December 9, 2023, it was announced that the fourth NXT: New Year's Evil, and fifth New Year's Evil overall, would be held on January 2, 2024. It was broadcast on the USA Network and took place at NXT's home venue, the WWE Performance Center in Orlando, Florida for a fourth consecutive year. The show was held as part of WWE's week-long programming of New Year's-themed shows called New Year's Knockout Week, which included Raw: Day 1 on January 1 and SmackDown: New Year's Revolution on January 5.

In the United Kingdom, NXT had aired on TNT Sports since January 2020. However, beginning with New Year's Evil, NXT moved back to WWE's streaming service, the WWE Network.

=== Storylines ===
The card included six matches that resulted from scripted storylines. Results were predetermined by WWE's writers on the NXT brand, while storylines were produced on WWE's weekly television program, NXT, and the supplementary online streaming show, Level Up.

At Deadline, Blair Davenport won the Women's Iron Survivor Challenge to earn an NXT Women's Championship match against Lyra Valkyria, while Trick Williams won the Men's Iron Survivor Challenge to earn an NXT Championship match against Ilja Dragunov. Both title matches were scheduled for New Year's Evil.

The NXT Men's Breakout Tournament is a tournament composed of eight male wrestlers from the NXT brand, with the winner earning a contract which can be cashed in for an NXT Championship or NXT North American Championship match at any time. The tournament began on the December 12 episode of NXT with the final scheduled for New Year's Evil.

Tiffany Stratton and Fallon Henley had been feuding since October 2023. Their feud came to a head on the December 19 episode of NXT, where Stratton dumped garbage on Henley and challenged her to a match at New Year's Evil, which Henley accepted. It was also stipulated that if Stratton won, Henley would have to become Stratton's servant for a day, but if Henley won, Stratton would have to work on Henley's ranch for a day.

On the December 19, 2023, episode of NXT, Arianna Grace mocked Roxanne Perez for losing her match to Kiana James at Deadline before being slapped by Perez. The following week, Grace spoke with NXT General Manager Ava and recommended her to force Perez to take anger management classes. Ava then informed Grace that a match between her and Perez would take place at New Year's Evil, which was later made official.

On the December 19, 2023, episode of NXT, SmackDown's Dragon Lee defeated Joe Coffey and Charlie Dempsey in a triple threat match to retain the NXT North American Championship. After the match, Lee was attacked by Dempsey and his No Quarter Catch Crew stablemates Drew Gulak, Damon Kemp, and Myles Borne. The Latino World Order (Joaquin Wilde and Cruz Del Toro) then came out to save Lee. The following week, No Quarter Catch Crew challenged Lee, Wilde, and Del Toro to a six man tag team match at New Year's Evil, which they accepted and was made official. However, a day before the event, Lee announced on X that he would miss New Year's Evil due to travel issues and was replaced by Carlito.

== Event ==
=== Main event ===
Despite Ilja Dragunov signing a contract to defend the NXT Championship against Trick Williams at New Year's Evil, it was announced during the event that Dragunov was not medically cleared to wrestle due to an injury incurred from Ridge Holland two weeks prior. In the locker room, as Williams and Carmelo Hayes were discussing the news, they were interrupted by SmackDown's Grayson Waller. Hayes then put Williams in a match to face Waller with Williams' Iron Survivor Challenge title match opportunity on the line. Williams went on to defeat Waller after interference from SmackDown's Kevin Owens, who appeared from the crowd and attacked Waller with his arm cast.

== Aftermath ==
This would be the last New Year's Evil to air on the USA Network, as NXT moved to The CW in October.

== Results ==
No.	Results	Stipulations	Times
1	Lyra Valkyria (c) defeated Blair Davenport by pinfall	Singles match for the NXT Women's Championship	8:26
2	Latino World Order (Carlito, Joaquin Wilde, and Cruz Del Toro) defeated No Quarter Catch Crew (Damon Kemp, Myles Borne, and Drew Gulak) by pinfall	Six-man tag team match	8:35
3	Arianna Grace defeated Roxanne Perez by disqualification (Note: Perez originally won the match by pinfall, but due to her continuing to attack Grace after the match, the referee reversed the decision, Perez was disqualified.)	Singles match	5:09
4	Fallon Henley defeated Tiffany Stratton by pinfall	Singles match Since Stratton lost, she became Henley's ranch hand for a day. Had Henley lost, she would have become Stratton's servant for a day.	9:04
5	Oba Femi defeated Riley Osborne by pinfall	NXT Men's Breakout Tournament final match	9:55
6	Trick Williams (Note: Williams was originally scheduled to face Ilja Dragunov for the NXT Championship, but due to injury, Dragunov was unable to compete and instead, a match between Waller and Williams was scheduled.) defeated Grayson Waller by pinfall	Singles match Williams's Iron Survivor Challenge title opportunity for the NXT Championship was on the line.	13:06
(c) / – the champion(s) heading into the match

=== NXT Men's Breakout Tournament ===
The third Men's Breakout Tournament began on the December 12, 2023, episode of NXT. Oba Femi defeated Riley Osborne in the final to win the tournament.

Tournament bracket

1st round NXT; December 12-13, 2023 (Aired: December 12–19)
Riley Osborne	Pinfall
Keanu Carver	3:28
Lexis King (Note: Lexis King replaced Trey Bearhill after he attacked Bearhill with a steel chair.)	Pinfall
Dion Lennox	2:59
Oba Femi	Pinfall
Myles Borne	3:35
Tavion Heights	Pinfall
Luca Crusifino	3:25

Semifinals; NXT; December 13, 2023 (Aired: December 26)
Riley Osborne	Pinfall
Lexis King	3:43
Oba Femi	Pinfall
Tavion Heights	4:10

Final; New Year's Evil; January 2, 2024
Riley Osborne	9:45
Oba Femi	Pinfall
