= NXT: New Year's Evil (2026) =

WWE television special

- Promotion: WWE
- Brand: NXT
- Date: January 6, 2026
- City: Orlando, Florida
- Venue: WWE Performance Center

NXT special episodes chronology
← Previous; Gold Rush	Next → Revenge

NXT: New Year's Evil chronology
← Previous; 2025	Next → —

The 2026 NXT: New Year's Evil was a professional wrestling television special produced by WWE, held for wrestlers from the promotion's developmental brand, NXT. It was WWE's sixth annual NXT: New Year's Evil, and the seventh New Year's Evil overall, and aired as a special episode of the weekly series NXT on The CW. The event took place on January 6, 2026, at NXT's home venue, the WWE Performance Center in Orlando, Florida for a fifth time. This returned the event to the venue, which was held here from 2021 to 2024.

Four matches were contested at the event. While primarily held for NXT, the event also featured a wrestler from WWE's partner promotion, Total Nonstop Action Wrestling (TNA). In the main event, Oba Femi defeated TNA's Leon Slater to retain the NXT Championship; following the match, Femi left the championship belt in the ring, voluntarily relinquishing the title as he subsequently moved to the main roster. In the show's other matches, Jacy Jayne defeated Kendal Grey to retain the NXT Women's Championship and Izzi Dame defeated Thea Hail in an open challenge to win the NXT Women's North American Championship, after Dame had lost to Tatum Paxley in the show's opening bout.

== Production ==
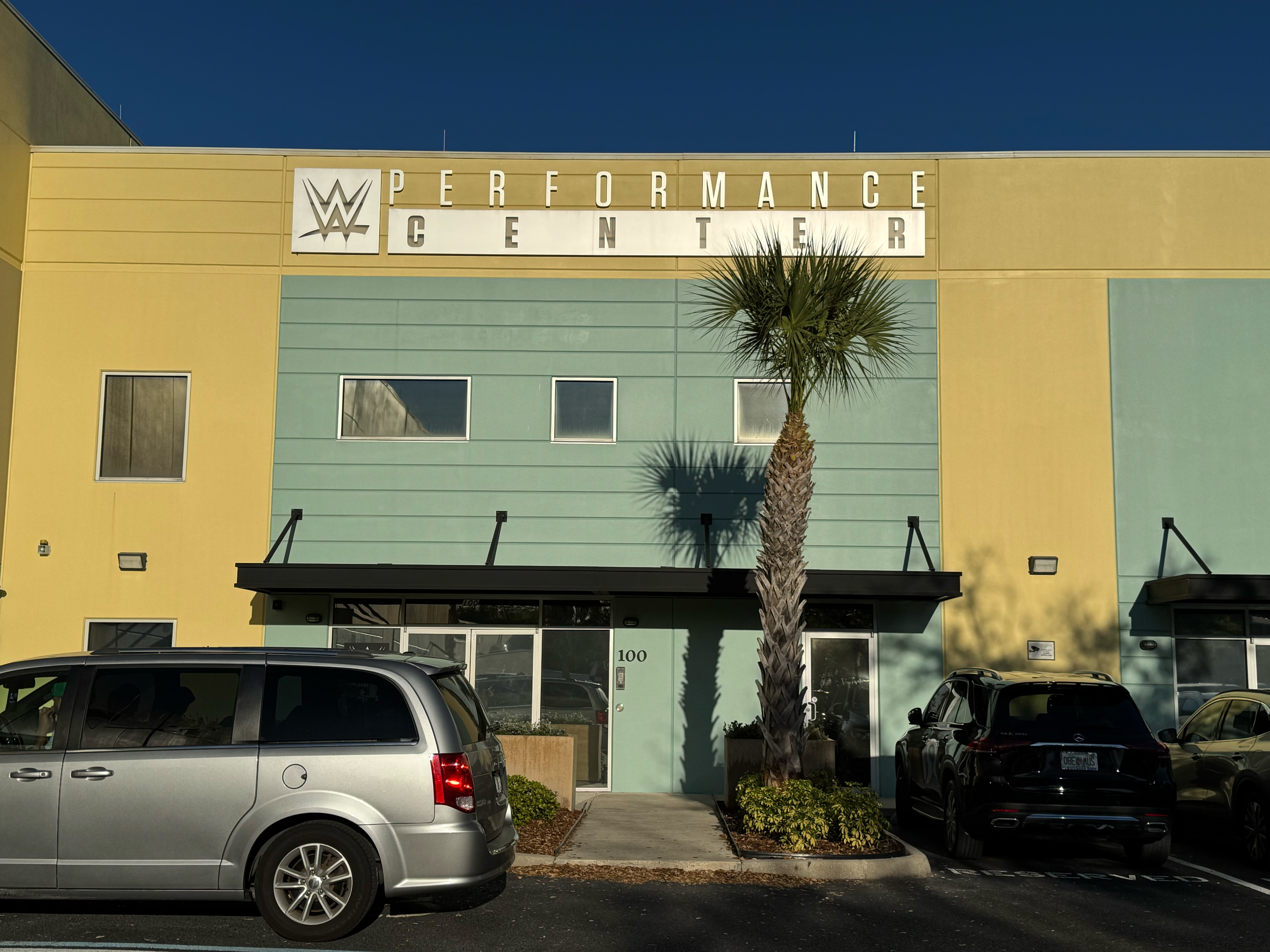
The sixth annual NXT: New Year's Evil, and seventh New Year's Evil overall, was held at NXT's home venue, the WWE Performance Center in Orlando, Florida for a fifth overall time.

=== Background ===
New Year's Evil is a professional wrestling television special held around New Year's. It was originally produced by the former World Championship Wrestling (WCW) as a special episode of its Monday Nitro program on December 27, 1999; this was the only New Year's Evil held by WCW, and then in March 2001, WCW was acquired by WWE, at the time still known as the World Wrestling Federation (WWF; renamed WWE in 2002). After 21 years since that WCW event, WWE reinstated New Year's Evil in 2021 for its developmental brand, NXT, becoming an annual special episode of NXT in early January.

During Deadline on December 6, 2025, it was announced that the sixth NXT: New Year's Evil, and seventh New Year's Evil overall, would be held on January 6, 2026. It was broadcast on The CW and returned the event to NXT's home venue, the WWE Performance Center in Orlando, Florida. This marked the fifth overall NXT: New Year's Evil held at the Performance Center, after the events between 2021 and 2024.

=== Storylines ===
The card consisted of four matches that resulted from scripted storylines. Results were predetermined by WWE's writers on the NXT brand, while storylines were produced on WWE's weekly television program, NXT, and the online streaming show, Evolve.

At Deadline, WWE Evolve Women's Champion Kendal Grey won the Women's Iron Survivor Challenge to earn an NXT Women's Championship match against Jacy Jayne at New Year's Evil.

Also at Deadline, Je'Von Evans won the Men's Iron Survivor Challenge to earn an NXT Championship match against Oba Femi at New Year's Evil. However, instead of waiting until New Year's Evil, Evans demanded his title match on the following episode of NXT. As a result, NXT General Manager Ava announced that the other four men who competed in the Iron Survivor Challenge—Dion Lennox, Joe Hendry, Myles Borne, and Leon Slater, the latter from partner promotion Total Nonstop Action Wrestling (TNA)—would compete in a fatal four-way match the following week, where the winner would earn a title match at New Year's Evil. Later that night, Femi retained the title against Evans, thus confirming he would be the defending champion at New Year's Evil, while Slater won the fatal four-way on the following episode to become the new #1 contender.

On the December 9, 2025, episode of NXT, Blake Monroe was supposed to hold an open challenge for her NXT Women's North American Championship, however, several women appeared, including Thea Hail, who attacked Monroe. This led to a match between both women on the following episode with the title on the line, however, a legitimate unplanned finish occurred, as Monroe was originally booked to retain the title. During a pinfall attempt by Hail, Monroe was supposed to kick out, but did not get her shoulder up in time and the referee counted the pin, naming Hail the winner and new champion, causing confusion to Hail, Monroe, and WWE's production team. It was reported that this affected WWE's creative for several wrestlers that was planned over the next two weeks as WWE was scheduled to tape the next two episodes of NXT in advance due to the holidays, with adjustments being made immediately. On the following episode, Monroe demanded Hail to give her the title back, which Hail declined, however, she agreed to a title rematch at New Year's Evil. At the start of the event, the title match that was supposed to open the show did not take place after Monroe viciously assaulted Hail during the latter's entrance. Monroe was subsequently banned from the building for her actions. Despite her injuries, Hail wanted to defend the title and decided to hold an open challenge, which Ava approved.

Entering 2025, Tatum Paxley formed an alliance with Gigi Dolin and Shotzi. At the end of May, Dolin and Shotzi were released by WWE, effectively disbanding the team. Izzi Dame then successfully recruited Paxley into The Culling (Dame, Niko Vance, and Shawn Spears) by preying on Paxley's emotional instability from losing her former teammates. On the October 14 episode of NXT, Paxley won a battle royal to become the #1 contender for the NXT Women's Championship by last eliminating Dame and Jordynne Grace, and subsequently defeated Jacy Jayne to win the title at Halloween Havoc. As champion, Paxley agreed to hand out title matches, much to the chagrin of The Culling. At NXT: Gold Rush – Night 1, Paxley lost the title back to Jayne after The Culling turned on her. Paxley then sought revenge against Dame, culminating in a match at Deadline, which Dame won after interference from The Culling. Paxley continued to haunt The Culling, playing psychological games with Vance and Spears, and on the December 30 episode of NXT, Dame called out Paxley, bragging about her. Paxley eventually came out, and announced that she would face Dame at New Year's Evil.

== Results ==
No.	Results	Stipulations	Times
1	Tatum Paxley defeated Izzi Dame by pinfall	Singles match	11:40
2	Jacy Jayne (c) (with Fallon Henley and Lainey Reid) defeated Kendal Grey (with Wren Sinclair) by pinfall	Singles match for the NXT Women's Championship	12:34
3	Izzi Dame (with Niko Vance and Shawn Spears) defeated Thea Hail (c) by pinfall (Note: Hail was originally scheduled to defend the NXT Women's North American Championship against Blake Monroe in the first match of the event. However, Monroe attacked Hail prior to the match and NXT General Manager Ava banned Monroe from the arena. Hail then decided to defend the title in an open challenge instead.)	Singles match for the NXT Women's North American Championship	10:01
4	Oba Femi (c) defeated Leon Slater by pinfall	Singles match for the NXT Championship	11:11
(c) / – the champion(s) heading into the match

== Aftermath ==
After Oba Femi successfully defended the NXT Championship against Leon Slater, he left the title belt in the middle of the ring. WWE later officially confirmed that Femi had vacated the NXT Championship.
