= NXT: New Year's Evil =

Professional wrestling television special series

- WWE New Year's Evil logo used in 2025
- Promotions: World Championship Wrestling (1999); WWE (2021–present)
- Brands: NXT (2021–present)
- First event: 1999

NXT: New Year's Evil is a New Year's-themed professional wrestling television special produced by the American promotion WWE for its developmental brand NXT since 2021. The event was originally established by rival World Championship Wrestling (WCW) and produced as a special episode of its Monday Nitro program on TNT on December 27, 1999. WWE acquired WCW in 2001, and after 21 years since that WCW event, WWE revived New Year's Evil in 2021 as an annual special episode of NXT, held in early January. It was broadcast on USA Network from 2021 before moving to The CW in 2025.

== History ==
On December 27, 1999, the former professional wrestling promotion World Championship Wrestling (WCW) produced a New Year's-themed television special titled New Year's Evil, which was broadcast on TNT as a special episode of WCW's flagship program, Monday Nitro. This would be the only New Year's Evil event produced by WCW, and then in March 2001, the company was acquired by WWE, at the time still known as the World Wrestling Federation (WWF; renamed WWE in May 2002). On December 6, 2020, after 21 years since that WCW event, WWE announced that it would revive New Year's Evil to be held for its developmental brand NXT on January 6, 2021, as a special episode of NXT, broadcast on the USA Network. Prior to this special, WWE's previous New Year's-themed event was the New Year's Revolution pay-per-view event, which was held from 2005 to 2007.

A second NXT: New Year's Evil was scheduled to be held as the January 4, 2022, episode of NXT. This in turn established New Year's Evil as an annual television special of NXT, held in early January. The 2024 event was held as part of WWE's week-long programming of New Year's-themed shows called New Year's Knockout Week. It was also the final New Year's Evil to air on the USA Network, as NXT moved to The CW in October that year.

== Events ==
#	Event	Date	City	Venue	Main event	Ref.
1	WCW Monday Nitro: New Year's Evil	December 27, 1999	Houston, Texas	Astrodome	Kevin Nash (c) vs. Sid Vicious and The Wall in a WCW World Tag Team Championship Lethal Lottery Tournament First Round 2-on-1 Handicap match	
2	NXT: New Year's Evil (2021)	January 6, 2021	Orlando, Florida	WWE Performance Center	Finn Bálor (c) vs. Kyle O'Reilly for the NXT Championship	
3	NXT: New Year's Evil (2022)	January 4, 2022	Orlando, Florida	WWE Performance Center	Tommaso Ciampa (c) vs. Bron Breakker for the NXT Championship	
4	NXT: New Year's Evil (2023)	January 10, 2023	Orlando, Florida	WWE Performance Center	20-woman Battle Royal to determine the #1 contender to the NXT Women's Championship at NXT Vengeance Day	
5	NXT: New Year's Evil (2024)	January 2, 2024	Orlando, Florida	WWE Performance Center	Trick Williams vs. Grayson Waller for Williams's Iron Survivor Challenge title opportunity for the NXT Championship	
6	NXT: New Year's Evil (2025)	January 7, 2025	Los Angeles, California	Shrine Expo Hall	Trick Williams (c) vs. Oba Femi vs. Eddy Thorpe in a triple threat match for the NXT Championship	
7	NXT: New Year's Evil (2026)	January 6, 2026	Orlando, Florida	WWE Performance Center	Oba Femi (c) vs. Leon Slater for the NXT Championship	
(c) – refers to the champion(s) heading into the match
