= Man Up (WWE and Def Rebel song) =

Single by WWE and Def Rebel
- Released: January 16, 2026
- Genre: bubblegum pop; dance-pop; hip-hop
- Length: 2:49
- Label: TuneCore; WWE
- Songwriters: Ali Theodore; Anthony Mirabella III; James Keith Petrie
- Producer: Def Rebel

WWE singles chronology
"Death Waltz" (2025)	"Man Up" (2026)	"Symphony No. 9 in E Minor" (2026)

Def Rebel singles chronology
"Death Waltz" (2025)	"Man Up" (2026)	"Symphony No. 9 in E Minor" (2026)

"Man Up" is a song by the American professional wrestling promotion company WWE and Def Rebel. It was released on January 16, 2026, through WWE Music Group, under their distributor TuneCore. It was written by Ali Theodore, Anthony Mirabella III, and James Keith Petrie, and produced by Def Rebel. The song has been described as bubblegum pop, dance-pop, and hip-hop and it is a entrance theme song of WWE wrestler Kit Wilson.

== Background and release ==
Kit Wilson adopted a new gimmick following an injury to his longtime tag team partner, Elton Prince, who sustained a serious neck injury the previous summer. Shortly after Wilson debuted his new look, it was reported that Prince had undergone neck fusion surgery, placing Pretty Deadly on an indefinite hiatus.

On January 2, 2026, episode of SmackDown, Kit Wilson debuted a new entrance theme and was defeated by Matt Cardona, who was returning to WWE after nearly six years. WWE Music Group released on January 16, 2026, with their distribution under TuneCore and uploaded four hour loop of the song to its YouTube channel following its popularity.

== Composition ==
"Man Up" is a two minutes and forty-nine seconds long. It was written by Ali Theodore, Anthony Mirabella III, and James Keith Petrie, and produced by Def Rebel. It has been described as bubblegum pop, dance-pop, and hip-hop track. Wilson stated that the song drew inspiration from contemporary pop music. He cited "Speed Drive" by Charli XCX, "Like Jennie" by Jennie from Blackpink, and "Femininomenon" by Chapell Roan. He also referenced "Guess" by Charli XCX and Billie Eilish.

== Reception ==
Steven Harrison of Athlon Sports wrote that the reason the song's presentation resonated quickly was return of a full titantron, which he said WWE had largely moved away from in recent years. He added that during Attitude Era, custom entrance videos were a defining part of wrestler's identity.
