= Kit Wilson =

English professional wrestler

Personal information
- Born: Samuel Stoker; 21 November 1994 (age 31) London, England
- Spouse: Stevie Turner (m. 2024)

Professional wrestling career
- Ring name(s): Kit Wilson; Sam Stoker; Sammy Smooth
- Billed height: 6 ft 1 in (1.85 m)
- Billed weight: 200 lb (91 kg)
- Billed from: Buckinghamshire, England
- Trained by: IPW: UK Wrestling School; James Davis; Zack Sabre Jr.
- Debut: 2015

Samuel Stoker (born 21 November 1994) is an English professional wrestler. He is signed to WWE, where he performs on the SmackDown brand under the ring name Kit Wilson. He is also known for his tag team tenure alongside Elton Prince, known as Pretty Deadly.

== Career ==
=== Early career (2015–2019) ===
Smooth trained with International Pro Wrestling: United Kingdom (IPW:UK). On 10 January 2015, wrestling under the name Sammy Smooth, he had his first tag match together with Lighting Lewis, under the name Greased Lightning at the IPW:UK Weekend of Champions event.

=== WWE (2019–present) ===
==== Pretty Deadly (2020–2025) ====
Stoker, along with Lewis Howley, began their WWE career making sporadic appearances for NXT UK as the tag team Pretty Deadly starting in 2019. Stoker and Howley signed contracts with WWE in January 2020. In February 2021, Stoker won his first title in WWE when Pretty Deadly defeated Gallus for the NXT UK Tag Team Championship, holding the titles until December of that year.

On 5 April 2022, Stoker made his NXT debut alongside Howley, under the new ring names Elton Prince and Kit Wilson. Throughout their appearances for NXT, Wilson became a two-time NXT Tag Team Champion alongside Prince. As part of the 2023 WWE Draft, Pretty Deadly were drafted to the SmackDown brand. Pretty Deadly made their SmackDown debut on 19 May, defeating The Brawling Brutes' Butch and Ridge Holland.

==== Singles competition (2025–present) ====
On 2 May 2025, Prince suffered a neck injury requiring surgery putting Pretty Deadly on hiatus. After a brief hiatus, Wilson began to appear as a singles competitor on SmackDown and Main Event. Beginning in 2026, Wilson debuted a new theme, and flamboyant gimmick in which he claims to be on a mission to eliminate toxic masculinity. On the 6 February episode of SmackDown, Wilson issued an open challenge to any Royal Rumble competitor. The challenge was accepted by Oba Femi, who quickly defeated Wilson. On the 20 February episode of SmackDown, he attempted to make amends with Femi by reading him poetry, but once again lost in an impromptu match.

In March, Wilson entered into a program with The Miz after they were both "cursed" by newcomer Danhausen. Wilson wrestled his first tag team match since 2025 after he and The Miz were offered a title match against new WWE Tag Team Champions R-Truth and Damian Priest on the 3 April episode of SmackDown, but lost after interference from Danhausen. Wilson would face Danhausen in the latter's in-ring debut on the 10 April episode of SmackDown with The Miz at ringside, losing after being knocked off the top turnbuckle (after receiving a curse from Danhausen) by a blast of pyro. At Backlash, Wilson and The Miz were defeated by Danhausen and "Minihausen" (portrayed by AAA wrestler Mascarita Dorada).

== Personal life ==
On 22 September 2024, Stoker married fellow professional wrestler Lucy Bridge, who performed in WWE under the ring name Stevie Turner.

== Championships and accomplishments ==
- APEX Pro Wrestling
  - APEX Heavyweight Championship (1 time)
- Battle Pro Wrestling
  - BPW Championship (1 time)
- International Pro Wrestling: United Kingdom
  - IPW All England Championship (2 times)
  - IWN Tag Team Championship (2 times) – with Lewis Howley
- United Kingdom Pro Wrestling
  - UKPW Inter-Regional Championship (1 time)
- WWE
  - WWE NXT Tag Team Championship (2 times) – with Elton Prince
  - WWE NXT UK Tag Team Championship (1 time) – with Elton Prince
