= Karl Fredericks =

American professional wrestler (born 1990)

Personal information
- Born: Karl Fredericks; July 15, 1990 (age 36) Reno, Nevada, U.S.

Professional wrestling career
- Ring name(s): Eddy Thorpe; Karl Fredericks
- Billed height: 6 ft 0 in (183 cm)
- Billed weight: 222 lb (101 kg)
- Billed from: "Sacred indigenous land"
- Trained by: Adam Thornstowe; Luster the Legend; Katsuyori Shibata; NJPW L.A. Dojo
- Debut: May 17, 2015

Karl Fredericks (born July 15, 1990) is an American professional wrestler. He is performing on the independent circuit under his real name. He is best known for his tenure in the WWE, where he performed under the ring name Eddy Thorpe. He is also known for his stint in New Japan Pro-Wrestling (NJPW), where he performed under his real name and was the winner of the 2019 Young Lion Cup.

== Professional wrestling career ==
=== Early career (2015–2018) ===
Fredericks was originally trained by independent wrestlers Reno SCUM. He had his debut match on May 17, 2015 for independent promotion Supreme Pro Wrestling in California, and continued to work for primarily California-based independent promotions through 2018.

=== New Japan Pro-Wrestling (2018–2022) ===
In 2018, Fredericks was accepted into the New Japan Pro-Wrestling LA Dojo, along with Clark Connors, Alex Coughlin, and Buddy Garcia. He visited Japan for the first time as a representative of the LA Dojo at the 2019 Young Lion Cup and won the tournament with 12 points. Fredericks teamed with Hirooki Goto for the World Tag League in the same year, finishing with 3 wins and 12 losses. On January 4, 2020, at Wrestle Kingdom 14, Fredericks, Connors, Coughlin and Toa Henare defeated Tencozy (Satoshi Kojima and Hiroyoshi Tenzan), Yota Tsuji and Yuya Uemura in an eight-man tag-team match.

In August 2020, Fredericks competed in the inaugural New Japan Cup USA tournament, with the winner receiving a match for the IWGP United States Championship. He lost to Kenta in the first round. From this time on, he changed the colors of his shorts from black to red. At the main event of Ignition on June 25, 2021, Fredericks challenged Tom Lawlor for the Strong Openweight Championship and lost. On August 1, 2022, Fredericks' contract with NJPW expired and he announced he would not renew it, ending his four-year tenure with the company.

=== WWE (2023–2025) ===
In January 2023, it was reported Fredericks signed a contract with WWE. In February, he was assigned the ring name Eddy Thorpe and he debuted as a face on the February 17 show of NXT Level Up, defeating Dante Chen. On the March 23 episode of NXT, Thorpe would make his TV debut defeating Myles Borne. In the next weeks, vignettes would air of Thorpe exploring his Native-American background. Thorpe would soon begin a feud with Damon Kemp which led to Thorpe enlisting the help of Gable Steveson (Kemp's real life brother) to train for his NXT Underground match with Kemp on the July 4 episode of NXT, which Thorpe won.

Soon after, Thorpe would begin feuding with Dijak, who took offense to Thorpe being referred to as the toughest man in NXT and attacked him in a match with Oro Mensah. On the September 26 episode of NXT, Thorpe beat Dijak in a strap match but was attacked after the match by Dijak who struck him repeatedly with the leather strap. On the November 28 episode of NXT, Thorpe fought Bron Breakker for a spot in the Iron Survivor Challenge at NXT Deadline but was defeated and once again attacked post match by Dijak. At NXT Deadline on December 9, Thorpe attacked Dijak during the Iron Survivor Challenge and cost him the match. On the December 26 episode of NXT, Thorpe defeated Dijak in the second NXT Underground match to end the feud.

On the November 19, 2024 episode of NXT, Thorpe participated in the Iron Survivor Challenge qualifier where he lost to NXT Tag Team Champion Nathan Frazer after being distracted by the NXT tag team division brawling outside the ring. Two weeks later, he won a fatal four-way last chance match to qualify for the Iron Survivor Challenge at NXT Deadline. However, he was later found attacked backstage and was ruled out for NXT Deadline. Two days after NXT Deadline on the December 10 episode of NXT, Thorpe confronted NXT Champion Trick Williams and demanded a title shot, which Williams agreed. Upon signing the title match contract, Thorpe turned heel and revealed to NXT general manager Ava that he staged his own attack to ease his way into an NXT Championship match. The title match on the following week ended in a double pinfall and Williams retained his title. After failing to win the NXT Championship again on separate occasions, Thorpe continued his feud with Williams, who had since lost the NXT Championship. The feud culminated in a strap match at NXT Vengeance Day on February 15, 2025, where Thorpe won in his first NXT PLE appearance. On the March 18 episode of NXT, Williams defeated Thorpe in an NXT Underground match to end their feud. On May 2, Thorpe was released from WWE, ending his two-year tenure with the company.

=== Independent circuit (2025–present) ===
On September 5, 2025, Fredericks made his first post-WWE appearance at West Coast Pro Wrestling's event God Called In Sick Today, where he unsuccessfully challenged Kevin Blackwood for the West Coast Pro Heavyweight Championship.

== Personal life ==
Fredericks is a Native American and his WWE ring name is a reference to fellow Native American athlete Jim Thorpe. Fredericks also incorporates his Native American heritage into his character by doing the Native American war dance in his entrance and by wearing tassels on his ring gear.

Fredericks is currently engaged to New Zealand professional wrestler Cheree Crowley, who is best known under the ring name Dakota Kai.

== Championships and accomplishments ==
- All Pro Wrestling
  - APW Worldwide Internet Championship (1 time)
  - APW Tag Team Championship (1 time) – with Styker
- New Japan Pro-Wrestling
  - Young Lion Cup (2019)
- Pro Championship Wrestling
  - PCW Inter-California Championship (1 time)
- Pro Wrestling Illustrated
  - Ranked No. 287 of the top 500 singles wrestlers in the PWI 500 in 2021
