= NXT: New Year's Evil (2021) =

WWE television special

- Promotional poster featuring Finn Bálor and Kyle O'Reilly
- Promotion: WWE
- Brand: NXT
- Date: January 6, 2021
- City: Orlando, Florida
- Venue: Capitol Wrestling Center at WWE Performance Center
- Attendance: 0 (behind closed doors) (Note: The event was held without a paying audience due to the COVID-19 pandemic in the United States, though it featured a live crowd of WWE wrestlers, trainees, and select invited fans as well as virtual fans via NXT's Capitol Wrestling Center viewing experience.)

NXT special episodes chronology
← Previous; Halloween Havoc	Next → The Great American Bash

New Year's Evil chronology
← Previous; 1999	Next → 2022

The 2021 NXT: New Year's Evil was a professional wrestling television special produced by WWE, held exclusively for wrestlers from the promotion's NXT brand division. It was WWE's first annual NXT: New Year's Evil, and the second New Year's Evil overall, and aired as a special episode of the weekly series NXT on the USA Network. Due to the COVID-19 pandemic, the event took place on January 6, 2021, at the Capitol Wrestling Center, a bio-secure bubble that was hosted at the WWE Performance Center in Orlando, Florida. NXT wrestler Dexter Lumis served as the event's host.

This was the first New Year's Evil held since December 27, 1999, which was produced by the former World Championship Wrestling (WCW) as a special episode of its Monday Nitro program; WCW was acquired by WWE in March 2001. This would subsequently be WWE's first New Year's themed event since the New Year's Revolution pay-per-view in 2007. With the scheduling of the 2022 event, New Year's Evil became an annual television special for NXT. This would also be the only New Year's Evil held before NXT was rebranded as "NXT 2.0" in September, which reverted NXT to a developmental brand for WWE.

Six matches were contested at the event. In the main event, Finn Bálor defeated Kyle O'Reilly to retain the NXT Championship. In other prominent matches, Santos Escobar defeated Gran Metalik to retain the NXT Cruiserweight Championship, Raquel González defeated Rhea Ripley in a Last Woman Standing match, and in the opening bout, Karrion Kross defeated Damian Priest.

== Production ==
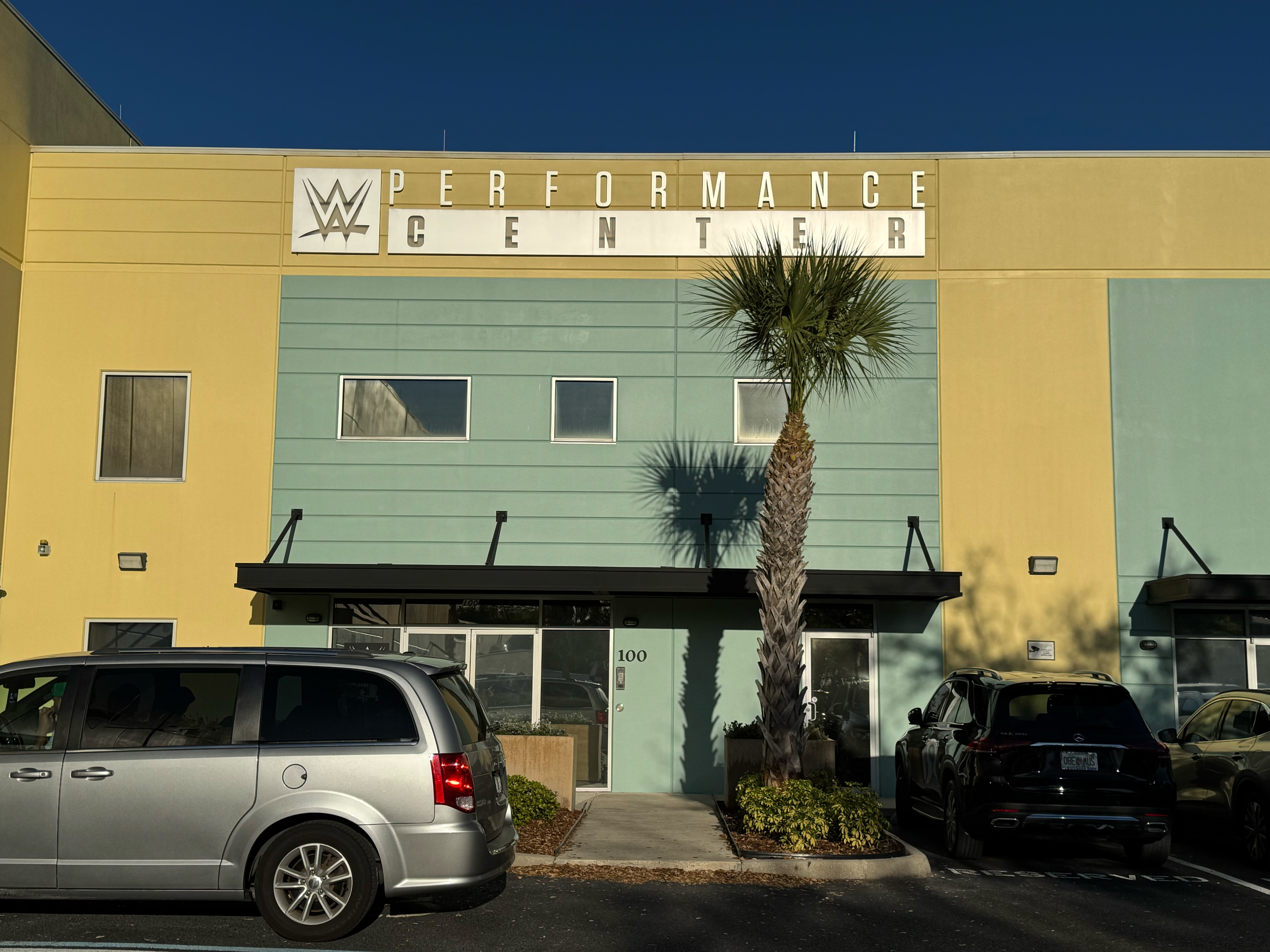
The first annual NXT: New Year's Evil, and second New Year's Evil overall, was held at the Capitol Wrestling Center, a bio-secure bubble that was hosted at the WWE Performance Center in Orlando, Florida.

=== Background ===
On December 27, 1999, the former professional wrestling promotion World Championship Wrestling (WCW) produced a New Year's-themed television special titled New Year's Evil, which was broadcast on TNT as a special episode of WCW's flagship program, Monday Nitro. This would be the only New Year's Evil event produced by WCW, and then in March 2001, the company was acquired by WWE, at the time still known as the World Wrestling Federation (WWF; renamed WWE in May 2002).

On December 6, 2020, after 21 years since that WCW event, WWE announced that it would reinstate New Year's Evil to be held for its NXT brand on January 6, 2021, as a special episode of the weekly series NXT on the USA Network. Prior to this special, WWE's previous New Year's-themed event was New Year's Revolution, which was held as a pay-per-view (PPV) event from 2005 to 2007. WWE also announced that the show would be hosted by NXT wrestler Dexter Lumis.

==== Impact of the COVID-19 pandemic ====
Due to the COVID-19 pandemic, WWE's NXT events had to be presented from a behind closed doors set at NXT's home venue at the time, Full Sail University in Winter Park, Florida, since mid-March; WWE's programming for Raw and SmackDown were also done in this manner but at the WWE Performance Center in Orlando, Florida, before moving to Orlando's Amway Center in August in a bio-secure bubble called the WWE ThunderDome (which was relocated to Tropicana Field in St. Petersburg that December). In October 2020, it was announced that beginning with TakeOver 31, NXT would be moving their events to the Performance Center, which would feature a bio-secure bubble called the Capitol Wrestling Center. Like the ThunderDome for Raw and SmackDown, LED boards were placed around the Performance Center so that fans could attend virtually, while additionally and unlike the ThunderDome, friends and family members of the wrestlers were in attendance, along with a limited number of actual live fans, divided from each other by plexiglass walls.

=== Storylines ===
The card included six matches that resulted from scripted storylines. Results were predetermined by WWE's writers on the NXT brand, while storylines were produced on WWE's weekly television program, NXT.

At TakeOver 31, Finn Bálor defeated Kyle O'Reilly to retain the NXT Championship. Both suffered legitimate injuries during the match, causing them to miss the following episode of NXT. On the December 9 episode, Pete Dunne stated his intentions to challenge O'Reilly for the title, but O'Reilly interrupted, followed by Damian Priest, who all wanted their own shot at the title. Bálor then stated that he would defend the title at New Year's Evil, but would also let NXT General Manager William Regal pick the challenger for the title. Afterwards, Scarlett, Karrion Kross's manager, interrupted, and Bálor stated that he would accept Kross's challenge whenever he was ready. Kross himself physically appeared that episode and attacked Priest, sending him through a table. The following week, O'Reilly defeated Dunne to become the number one contender for the title at New Year's Evil. Also that same episode after Kross won his match, Kross called out Priest for a match at New Year's Evil.

At NXT: Halloween Havoc, Rhea Ripley defeated Raquel González (accompanied by Dakota Kai). At TakeOver: WarGames, González's team defeated Ripley's team, with González scoring the winning pinfall. On the following episode of NXT, after González defeated Ember Moon, González and Toni Storm attacked Moon before Ripley made the save, after which, González and Ripley stared each other down. The following week, Ripley lost to Storm after interference from González. On the December 23 episode after Ripley won her match, Ripley and González engaged in a massive brawl, even fighting through the officials who were trying to separate them. Later that night, a Last Woman Standing match between González and Ripley was scheduled for New Year's Evil.

On the December 30 episode of NXT, while Legado Del Fantasma (NXT Cruiserweight Champion Santos Escobar, Joaquin Wilde, and Raul Mendoza) were talking about how great 2020 had been for them, they were interrupted by Lucha House Party (Gran Metalik and Lince Dorado), leading to a tag team match immediately afterwards where Lucha House Party were victorious. Later that night, New Year's Evil host Dexter Lumis announced that Escobar would defend the NXT Cruiserweight Championship against Metalik at New Year's Evil.

On the December 30 episode of NXT, after weeks of training sessions, Xia Li and Boa announced that they would make an appearance at New Year's Evil.

==== Canceled and rescheduled match ====
At TakeOver: WarGames, Tommaso Ciampa defeated Timothy Thatcher. On the following episode of NXT, Ciampa won his match despite interference from one of Thatcher's allies. Two weeks later after Thatcher lost his match, Thatcher attacked his opponent until Ciampa performed Willow's Bell on Thatcher before telling him that he would see him in a fight pit at New Year's Evil. However, the day of the event, it was announced that Thatcher had injured himself while training for the match, and the match was postponed. The match was rescheduled to the January 20 episode, where Thatcher was victorious. Afterwards, Thatcher announced that he and Ciampa would team up in the sixth Dusty Rhodes Tag Team Classic tournament.

== Aftermath ==
With the scheduling of the 2022 event, New Year's Evil became an annual television special for NXT. The brand itself was rebranded as "NXT 2.0" in September, reverting NXT to being a developmental brand for WWE.

== Results ==
No.	Results	Stipulations	Times
1	Karrion Kross (with Scarlett) defeated Damian Priest by pinfall	Singles match	15:29
2	Santos Escobar (c) (with Joaquin Wilde and Raul Mendoza) defeated Gran Metalik (with Lince Dorado) by pinfall	Singles match for the NXT Cruiserweight Championship	12:28
3	Xia Li (with Boa) defeated Katrina Cortez by pinfall	Singles match	1:27
4	Raquel González (with Dakota Kai) defeated Rhea Ripley as Ripley was unable to make it to her feet before the referee's count of 10	Last Woman Standing match	17:26
5	Kushida and Shotzi Blackheart defeated The Way (Johnny Gargano and Candice LeRae) (with Austin Theory and Indi Hartwell) by pinfall	Mixed tag team match	8:57
6	Finn Bálor (c) defeated Kyle O'Reilly by submission	Singles match for the NXT Championship	17:24
(c) / – the champion(s) heading into the match
