= NXT Battleground (2025) =

WWE premium live event

- Promotional poster featuring Je'Von Evans, Stephanie Vaquer, Oba Femi, Sol Ruca, and Jaida Parker
- Promotion: WWE
- Brand: NXT
- Date: May 25, 2025
- City: Tampa, Florida
- Venue: Yuengling Center
- Attendance: 7,481

WWE event chronology
← Previous; Saturday Night's Main Event XXXIX	Next → Worlds Collide

Battleground chronology
← Previous; 2024	Next → Final

NXT major events chronology
← Previous; Stand & Deliver	Next → The Great American Bash

The 2025 NXT Battleground, also promoted as NXT Battleground: Tampa, was a professional wrestling premium live event (PLE) produced by WWE, held for wrestlers from the promotion's developmental brand, NXT. It was NXT's third annual Battleground and WWE's eighth and final overall. The event took place during Memorial Day weekend on Sunday, May 25, 2025, at the Yuengling Center in Tampa, Florida, which was NXT's first PLE to take place in Tampa.

Six matches were contested at the event. While primarily held for NXT, one wrestler from WWE's partner promotion Total Nonstop Action Wrestling (TNA) also performed. In the main event, Trick Williams defeated TNA's Joe Hendry to win the TNA World Championship; this was the first time a TNA championship was defended on a WWE PLE. In other prominent matches, Oba Femi defeated Myles Borne to retain the NXT Championship and Stephanie Vaquer defeated Jordynne Grace to retain the NXT Women's Championship.

This 2025 event returned NXT's Battleground to Memorial Day weekend after the previous year's event was held in June. As such and like the 2023 edition, the PLE went head-to-head against All Elite Wrestling's pay-per-view event, Double or Nothing. This would also be the only Battleground to livestream on Netflix in most markets outside the United States following the WWE Network's merger under the service in January 2025 in those areas.

== Production ==
=== Background ===
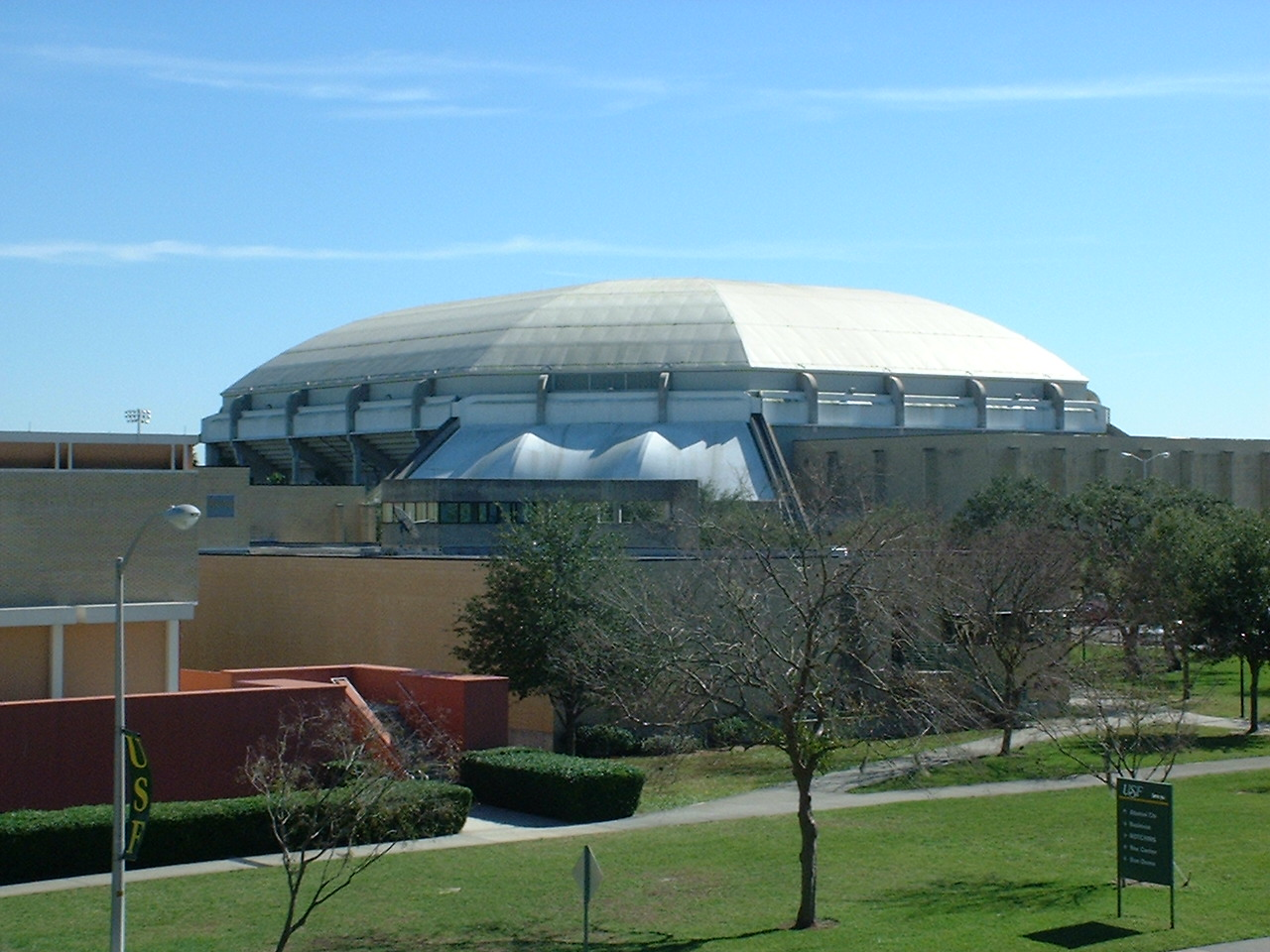
NXT's third annual Battleground, and WWE's eighth overall, was held at the Yuengling Center in Tampa, Florida.

Battleground is a professional wrestling premium live event (PLE) established by WWE in 2013. It was originally held annually for its main roster until 2017, and it was originally broadcast exclusively via pay-per-view (PPV) before it began simulcasting on WWE's livestreaming platforms in 2014. Battleground was discontinued following the 2017 event, but after six years, it was reinstated in 2023 as an annual PLE for WWE's developmental brand, NXT.

On March 7, 2025, NXT's third Battleground, and WWE's eighth overall, was announced to be held during Memorial Day weekend on Sunday, May 25, 2025, at the Yuengling Center in Tampa, Florida. This returned NXT's Battleground back to Memorial Day weekend after the previous year's event was held in June. The event was part of a four-night residency at Yuengling Center, alongside Saturday Night's Main Event XXXIX, Monday Night Raw, and NXT; however, the NXT taping for May 27 was cancelled due to low ticket sales. This became NXT's first PLE to take place in Tampa, as the city was previously planned to host NXT TakeOver: Tampa Bay in 2020 at nearby Amalie Arena, but it was cancelled due to the COVID-19 pandemic. Beginning with Halloween Havoc in 2024, all major NXT events were branded solely with the WWE logo instead of the NXT logo, marking the first Battleground since 2017 to just use the promotion's logo. Tickets went on sale on March 14 via Ticketmaster.

As with the 2023 event, Battleground went head-to-head with Double or Nothing, a PPV event produced by rival company All Elite Wrestling (AEW). According to WWE executive Shawn Michaels back in 2023, the scheduling was not intended for WWE to go head-to-head with AEW, but that it was just due to the holiday (Memorial Day weekend) as he said WWE events had always done well on holidays.

=== Broadcast outlets ===
The PLE was broadcast on WWE's livestreaming platforms. These included Peacock in the United States, Disney+ in the Philippines, SuperSport in Sub-Saharan Africa, Abema in Japan, Netflix in most other international markets, and the WWE Network in a select few countries that had not yet transferred to Netflix due to pre-existing contracts. This marked the first Battleground to livestream on Netflix following the WWE Network's merger under the service in January 2025 in those areas.

=== Storylines ===
The event included six matches that resulted from scripted storylines. Results were predetermined by WWE's writers on the NXT brand, while storylines were produced on WWE's weekly television program, NXT, as well as Total Nonstop Action Wrestling's (TNA) weekly television program, Impact!, following WWE and TNA signing a multi-year partnership in January 2025.

Following Oba Femi's successful NXT Championship defense at Stand & Deliver, a battle royal was scheduled for the May 6 episode of NXT to determine the number one contender for the title at Battleground. The match was won by No Quarter Catch Crew's Myles Borne.

At Stand & Deliver, Stephanie Vaquer retained the NXT Women's Championship in a fatal four-way match involving Jordynne Grace and Giulia. On the April 22 episode of NXT, after Vaquer won her match, she was confronted by Grace and Giulia. After Grace's team defeated Giulia's team in a tag team match the following week, NXT General Manager Ava scheduled a match between Grace and Giulia on the May 6 episode, where the winner would face Vaquer for the title at Battleground. The match was won by Grace.

On the April 22 episode of NXT, TNA World Champion Joe Hendry interrupted NXT Champion Oba Femi and Trick Williams, trying to stake a claim to Femi's title. Williams took exception to Hendry's comments and mocked him for his quick defeat against Randy Orton at WrestleMania 41, stating he was "first in line" for the title while telling Hendry he "didn't belong" in NXT. Hendry fired back at Williams's constant complaining before going eye-to-eye with Femi. Williams tried to intervene but was quickly dispatched by the two champions. Five days later at TNA Rebellion, Williams ambushed Hendry after his successful title defense to close the show. On the next episode of NXT, Hendry appeared and called out Williams, but was instead attacked by DarkState (Dion Lennox, Saquon Shugars, Cutler James, and Osiris Griffin). Williams eventually appeared later, disregarding Hendry as a viable threat and star. Two days later on Impact!, Hendry again called out Williams, but was met with a supposed satellite feed from the latter, who said he was preparing for a battle royal on the next week's NXT to determine Femi's next challenger. In the main event, Williams attacked Hendry during his six-man tag team match, costing Hendry's team the match, with Williams laying out Hendry after the match. It was subsequently announced that Hendry and Elijah, whom Hendry formed an alliance, would face Williams in a tag team match two days before Battleground at TNA Under Siege, marking Williams's TNA in-ring debut. On the next episode of NXT, Williams once again interfered in Hendry's six-man tag team match against DarkState, again costing Hendry the match. Later that night, Hendry interfered in the battle royal, allowing Elijah to eliminate Williams. NXT General Manager Ava subsequently announced that after speaking with TNA Director of Authority Santino Marella, Hendry would defend the TNA World Championship against Williams at Battleground, marking the first time a TNA championship would be defended in a WWE ring.

Prior to Stand & Deliver, The D'Angelo Family (Tony D'Angelo, Channing "Stacks" Lorenzo, Luca Crusifino, and Adriana Rizzo) had been feuding with DarkState (Dion Lennox, Saquon Shugars, Cutler James, and Osiris Griffin). On the April 8 episode of NXT, Lorenzo challenged DarkState to meet him in the parking lot the following week unbeknownst to D'Angelo, where he and Crusifino engaged in a vicious brawl with DarkState, who got the upper hand until D'Angelo arrived to even the odds. D'Angelo confronted Lorenzo for not consulting him about this plan. This led to a six-man tag team match at Stand & Deliver, where Lorenzo turned on D'Angelo, turning heel in the process and costing The D'Angelo Family the match. Over the following weeks, Crusifino disappeared while Rizzo went into hiding at a safe house per D'Angelo's request. On the April 29 episode, D'Angelo stated that Lorenzo's impulsivity put the group in danger and vowed to get revenge. Lorenzo responded via satellite and stated that D'Angelo had grown soft and was no longer capable of leading the group. On the May 13 episode, D'Angelo competed against Wes Lee, where Lorenzo appeared via satellite from outside of Rizzo's safe house, distracting D'Angelo long enough to cost him the match. Later that night, D'Angelo arrived at the safe house, only to be ambushed by Lorenzo, who stated that he would end D'Angelo at Battleground, with a match between the two being scheduled for the event.

At Stand & Deliver, WWE Women's Speed Champion Sol Ruca won a ladder match also involving Kelani Jordan and Ruca's tag team partner Zaria to win the vacant NXT Women's North American Championship, becoming a double champion. On the April 29 episode of NXT, Jordan mocked Ruca and Zaria, stating that when she was the Women's North American Champion, she defended the title every week. Ruca was about to agree to defend her title, but Zaria interrupted, stating that Jordan would have to face her first. A match between Jordan and Zaria took place on the next episode, where Zaria won. On the next episode, Kelani challenged Zaria for a rematch, stating that if she won, she would challenge for Ruca's Women's North American Championship at Battleground. Ruca agreed, and the match took place on the next episode, where Jordan defeated Zaria.

On the May 6 episode of NXT, Pro Wrestling Noah's Yoshiki Inamura announced that he would be heading back to his native Japan, effectively ending his partnership with Josh Briggs after months of dissension between the two. The following week, Briggs reflected on how he felt guilty as if he pushed Inamura away, but he was comforted by NXT Tag Team Champions Hank and Tank (Hank Walker and Tank Ledger). The Culling leader Shawn Spears interrupted, saying Briggs had a pattern of pushing people away, including his former tag team partner, Brooks Jensen, a member of The Culling. This led to a match between the two on the next episode where Spears defeated Briggs after interference from the rest of The Culling (Jensen, Niko Vance, and Izzi Dame). After the match, Briggs attacked Spears, but was attacked by The Culling before Walker and Ledger came out to even the odds. Later that night, it was announced that Briggs, Walker, and Ledger would face Spears, Jensen, and Vance in a six-man tag team match at Battleground.

== Event ==
Other on-screen personnel
Role:	Name:
Commentators	Vic Joseph
Commentators	Corey Graves
Commentators	Booker T
Spanish commentators	Marcelo Rodríguez
Spanish commentators	Jerry Soto
Ring announcer	Mike Rome
Referees	Adrian Butler
Referees	Chip Danning
Referees	Dallas Irvin
Referees	Derek Sanders
Referees	Felix Fernandez
Interviewers	Kelly Kincaid
Interviewers	Sarah Schreiber
Pre-show panel	Megan Morant
Pre-show panel	Sam Roberts

=== Preliminary matches ===
The PLE opened with Sol Ruca defending the NXT Women's North American Championship against Kelani Jordan, who was accompanied by Zaria. Ruca delivered a headbutt to Jordan before executing her finisher The Sol Snatcher to retain her title.

In the second match, Hank Walker and Tank Ledger secured a victory by hitting their signature Headbutt and Powerslam combination. Following the bout, The Culling launched a surprise attack on Josh Briggs. Yoshiki Inamura intervened, seizing a steel chair from Izzi Dame and using it to clear the ring.

The third match saw interference from Luca Crusifino, who appeared at ringside to distract Tony D'Angelo and the referee. Taking advantage of the distraction, Channing "Stacks" Lorenzo delivered a low blow to D'Angelo and followed up with a bicycle kick to the back of his head to earn the win. After the match, D'Angelo refused a hug from Crusifino, indicating tension between the two.

In the fourth match, Stephanie Vaquer defeated Jordynne Grace to retain the NXT Women's Championship after delivering a Spiral Tap. Post-match, Vaquer was involved in a backstage altercation with AAA wrestlers Chik Tormenta and Dalys. The confrontation escalated when Jacy Jayne slapped Vaquer, leading to a backstage brawl.

In the fifth match, Oba Femi defeated Myles Borne to retain the NXT Championship by delivering two Falls From Grace finishers to secure the victory.

=== Main event ===
The main event featured Trick Williams facing Joe Hendry for the TNA World Championship. This marked the first occasion that a TNA championship was defended on a WWE PLE During the match, Williams seized the TNA title belt, prompting Hendry to attempt his signature Standing Ovation chokeslam. However, Williams countered with an eye rake and executed a flapjack onto the TNA title belt. He then followed up with his finishing manoeuvre, the Trick Shot, to secure the victory. With this win, Williams became the first active WWE wrestler to win the TNA World Championship, and the third non-contracted TNA wrestler to capture the title (the other two being Kenny Omega and Christian Cage, who were both signed to AEW when they last won the title).

== Aftermath ==
On the following episode of NXT, it was announced that NXT Women's Champion Stephanie Vaquer would team with Lola Vice to take on Chik Tormenta and Dalys at Worlds Collide. Also on that episode, Jacy Jayne defeated Vaquer to win the title after interference from Fallon Henley and Jazmyn Nyx.

Ricky Saints would later lose the NXT North American Championship to Ethan Page, marking Page's second NXT singles title win in less than a calendar year. It was then announced that Page would put the title on the line at Worlds Collide against former rival Je'Von Evans as well as SmackDown's Rey Fenix and AAA's Laredo Kid in a fatal four-way match.

This would be the final Battleground held as another event was not scheduled for 2026.

== Results ==
No.	Results	Stipulations	Times
1	Sol Ruca (c) (with Zaria) defeated Kelani Jordan by pinfall	Singles match for the NXT Women's North American Championship	12:59
2	Hank and Tank (Hank Walker and Tank Ledger) and Josh Briggs defeated The Culling (Brooks Jensen, Niko Vance, and Shawn Spears) (with Izzi Dame) by pinfall	Six-man tag team match	9:26
3	Channing "Stacks" Lorenzo defeated Tony D'Angelo by pinfall	Singles match	15:14
4	Stephanie Vaquer (c) defeated Jordynne Grace by pinfall	Singles match for the NXT Women's Championship	16:07
5	Oba Femi (c) defeated Myles Borne by pinfall	Singles match for the NXT Championship	16:49
6	Trick Williams defeated Joe Hendry (c) by pinfall	Singles match for the TNA World Championship	14:58
(c) / – the champion(s) heading into the match
