= The Culling (professional wrestling) =

Professional wrestling stable

Stable
- Leader: Izzi Dame (II)
- Members: Niko Vance
- Name: The Culling
- Billed heights: Vance: 6 ft 2 in (1.88 m); Dame: 5 ft 10 in (1.78 m)
- Former members: Brooks Jensen; Tatum Paxley; Shawn Spears (I)
- Debut: August 13, 2024
- Years active: 2024–present

The Culling is a villainous professional wrestling mixed tag team consisting of second leader Izzi Dame and Niko Vance. They are signed to WWE, where they perform on the NXT brand. Dame is a former one-time NXT Women's North American Champion and Vance is a former one-time ROW Heavyweight Champion.

== Background ==
On June 21, 2024, Brooks Jensen posted on X that he was (kayfabe) released by WWE, which began a storyline where he wasn't working for the company. Jensen subsequently appeared on indie events at this time, and he also appeared in the background of NXT arena to target Senior Vice President of Talent Development Creative Shawn Michaels. He was also seen intruding on the WWE Performance Center during tapings of NXT. On the July 9 episode of NXT, Jensen had a sit-down with then-NXT General Manager Ava, who agreed to give Jensen a second chance after Josh Briggs, Jensen's former tag team partner, vouched for Jensen. Moments later, he was seen attacking Je'Von Evans backstage. On the following week, Jensen was defeated by Evans. After the match, Jensen attacked Evans and was stopped by Briggs, to which Jensen challenged Briggs to a No Disqualification match, where Jensen won after interference from Shawn Spears. On the August 13 episode of NXT, Jensen acknowledged Spears as his mentor and the reason behind his new attitude, solidifying this alliance.

== History ==
On November 12, 2024, Niko Vance made his debut on NXT, aligning himself with Spears and Jensen. During this time, Spears, Jensen, and Vance would begin to feud with The D'Angelo Family. Vance would have his first bout in NXT on January 21, 2025, teaming with Jensen to defeat The D'Angelo Family (Luca Crusifino and Channing "Stacks" Lorenzo). In early 2025, Izzi Dame was accepted into The D'Angelo Family (Tony D'Angelo, Channing "Stacks" Lorenzo, Adriana Rizzo, and Luca Crusifino) when she was stalked by Spears, who was attempting to recruit her into his stable. On the February 11 episode of NXT, D'Angelo successfully defended his NXT North American Championship against Ridge Holland in a steel cage match (which was suggested by Dame herself to D'Angelo in the prior week). After the match, Dame turned on The D'Angelo Family and sided with Spears. On the March 4 episode of NXT, Spears defeated Tony D'Angelo to win the NXT North American Championship. A week later, at NXT: Roadblock, during a vignette with all four members, they officially started calling themselves The Culling. On the April 1 episode of NXT, Spears lost the NXT North American Championship to Ricky Saints despite interference from The Culling, ending his reign at 28 days.

On the June 3, 2025 episode of NXT, Jensen was kicked out of The Culling by Dame for losing them the match at NXT Battleground and believed Tatum Paxley was a more valuable asset to the group. On the July 1 episode of NXT, Paxley and Dame defeated Zaria and NXT Women's North American and Speed Women's Champion Sol Ruca in a tag team match for Paxley to join The Culling. For pinning Ruca in the tag team match, Dame received an NXT Women's North American Championship match at NXT Great American Bash on July 12 but failed to defeat Ruca for the title. At Evolution on the following day, Dame and Paxley entered the 20-woman battle royal for a women's world championship match at Clash in Paris, but the pair were immediately eliminated at the start of the match by Nia Jax. On the July 22 episode of NXT, The Culling (Spears, Vance, Dame and Paxley) defeated NXT Tag Team Champions Hank and Tank, Zaria, and Ruca in an eight-person mixed tag team match in The Culling's first match as a whole stable. On the August 5 episode of NXT, Paxley challenged Ruca for the NXT Women's North American Championship but failed to win the title. On the October 14 episode of NXT, Paxley won a battle royal to become the #1 contender for the NXT Women's Championship by last eliminating Dame and Jordynne Grace. At NXT Halloween Havoc on October 25, Paxley defeated Jacy Jayne to win the title. Throughout her title reign, Paxley was handing out title matches, which did not sit well with the stable. At Week 1 of NXT: Gold Rush on November 18, Paxley lost the title back to Jayne after The Culling turned on her, ending her reign at 24 days while exiling Paxley from the stable. At NXT Deadline, Dame defeated Paxley due to distraction from The Culling. On January 6, 2026, at NXT: New Year's Evil, Dame lost to Paxley in a rematch. Later that night, Dame answered Thea Hail's open challenge for the NXT Women's North American Championship and defeated Hail to win the title, marking the first championship in her career. She would hold the title until NXT Vengeance Day on March 7, 2026, when she lost it to former stablemate Paxley, making her the second superstar alongside Stephanie Vaquer to hold both the NXT Women's and North American Championships. On April 10, 2026, at Reality of Wrestling's The Last Stand Rumble, Vance defeated Danny Limelight to win the ROW Heavweight Championship, the first championship win in his career. On the June 23, 2026 episode of NXT, Vance attacked Spears and put him through the announce table as Dame watched, kicking Spears out of the group. On August 8 at Reality of Wrestling's Summer of Champions XII, Niko lost the ROW Heavyweight Championship to Max Castellanos in a fatal four-way match.

== Members ==
*	Founding member
I-II	Leader(s)

=== Current ===
Member		Joined
Niko Vance		November 12, 2024
Izzi Dame	II	February 11, 2025

=== Former ===
Member		Joined	Left
Brooks Jensen	*	August 13, 2024	June 3, 2025
Tatum Paxley		July 1, 2025	November 18, 2025
Shawn Spears	*I	August 13, 2024	June 23, 2026

== Championships and accomplishments ==
- WWE
  - NXT North American Championship (1 time) – Spears
  - NXT Women's Championship (1 time) – Paxley
  - NXT Women's North American Championship (1 time) – Dame
- Reality of Wrestling
  - ROW Heavyweight Championship (1 time) – Vance
