= NXT: Homecoming (2025) =

WWE television special

- Event logo
- Promotion: WWE
- Brand: NXT
- Date: September 16, 2025
- City: Winter Park, Florida
- Venue: Full Sail University
- Attendance: 1,200

NXT special episodes chronology
| ← Previous; Roadblock | Next → NXT vs. TNA Showdown |

NXT: Homecoming was a 2025 professional wrestling television special produced by WWE, held for wrestlers from the promotion's developmental brand, NXT. The event aired as a special episode of the weekly series NXT on the The CW and took place on September 16, 2025, at NXT's original home venue, Full Sail University in Winter Park, Florida. Full Sail had served as NXT's home venue from 2012 to 2020 before moving to the WWE Performance Center in Orlando, Florida, which marked the first NXT event at Full Sail since September 23, 2020. Four matches took place during the broadcast, with two dark matches held before the event aired live.

== Production ==
Other on-screen personnel
| Role: | Name: |
|---|---|
| Commentators | Vic Joseph |
| Commentators | Booker T |

=== Background ===
In mid-2012, WWE ceased operations of its developmental territory, Florida Championship Wrestling (FCW), and begun taping episodes for the revamped NXT program on WWE.com at Full Sail University in Winter Park, Florida on May 17, 2012, in which the format would be changed from a hybrid of WWE's scripted live event shows and reality television to a developmental brand to train wrestlers before being called up to the main roster brands, Raw and SmackDown. Full Sail would continue to be the home arena for NXT until the September 23, 2020, broadcast of NXT, as the brand relocated to the WWE Performance Center in Orlando, Florida that October.

During NXT Heatwave on August 24, 2025, WWE announced that after five years, NXT would return to Full Sail University on September 16, 2025, to present a live television special as a "Homecoming" special episode of NXT on The CW.

=== Storylines ===
The card included five matches that resulted from scripted storylines. Results were predetermined by WWE's writers on the NXT brand, while storylines were produced on the weekly television program, NXT.

== Results ==
| No. | Results | Stipulations | Times |
|---|---|---|---|
| 1^{D} | Thea Hail defeated Kendal Grey | Singles match | — |
| 2^{D} | Andre Chase defeated Channing "Stacks" Lorenzo | Singles non title match | — |
| 3 | Alexa Bliss and Charlotte Flair (c) defeated The Culling (Izzi Dame and Tatum Paxley) (with Niko Vance and Shawn Spears) | Tag team match for the WWE Women's Tag Team Championship | 11:09 |
| 4 | Trick Melo Gang (Carmelo Hayes and Trick Williams) defeated #DIY (Johnny Gargano and Tommaso Ciampa) | Tag team match | 10:39 |
| 5 | Ethan Page (c) defeated Tyler Breeze | Singles match for the NXT North American Championship | 10:38 |
| 6 | Rhea Ripley, Stephanie Vaquer, and Lyra Valkyria defeated Fatal Influence (Jacy Jayne, Fallon Henley, and Jazmyn Nyx) | Six-woman tag team match | 10:26 |
(c) / – the champion(s) heading into the match; D / – this was a dark match
