= NXT Stand & Deliver (2025) =

WWE premium live event

- Promotional poster featuring Oba Femi, Stephanie Vaquer, Jaida Parker, Giulia, Tony D'Angelo, and Trick Williams
- Promotion: WWE
- Brand: NXT
- Date: April 19, 2025
- City: Paradise, Nevada
- Venue: T-Mobile Arena
- Attendance: ~7,000

WWE event chronology
← Previous; Elimination Chamber	Next → WrestleMania 41

NXT Stand & Deliver chronology
← Previous; 2024	Next → 2026

NXT major events chronology
← Previous; Vengeance Day	Next → Battleground

The 2025 NXT Stand & Deliver, also promoted as NXT Stand & Deliver: Las Vegas, was a professional wrestling premium live event (PLE) produced by WWE, held for wrestlers from the promotion's developmental brand, NXT. It was the fifth annual Stand & Deliver and took place on Saturday, April 19, 2025, at the T-Mobile Arena in the Las Vegas suburb of Paradise, Nevada. The event was held as a part of WrestleMania Weekend, occurring the same day as WrestleMania 41 Night 1 with a special start time of 10:00 a.m. Pacific Time (1:00 p.m. Eastern Time).

Seven matches were contested at the event, including one on the Countdown to Stand & Deliver pre-show. In the main event, Oba Femi defeated Je'Von Evans and Trick Williams in a triple threat match to retain the NXT Championship. In other prominent matches, WWE Women's Speed Champion Sol Ruca won the vacant NXT Women's North American Championship in a six-woman ladder match, becoming a double champion in the process, and Hank and Tank (Hank Walker and Tank Ledger) defeated Fraxiom (Nathan Frazer and Axiom) to win the NXT Tag Team Championship. The event also marked the final appearance of Fraxiom in NXT as the team moved to the main roster a week later.

This was the first Stand & Deliver to livestream on Netflix in most markets outside the United States following the WWE Network's merger under the service in January 2025 in those affected areas, and it would also be the last on the WWE Network in any country as the last few countries that were still on the service due to pre-existing contracts merged under Netflix on April 1, 2026. It was also the final Stand & Deliver to air on Disney+ in the Philippines before it too merged under Netflix on January 1, 2026, as well as the last to air on Peacock in the United States, as WWE's contract for NXT's PLEs on the service ended in March 2026 with the 2026 event livestreamed on YouTube in the US. This would also be the last Stand & Deliver to be held during the week of WrestleMania as the 2026 event was a standalone event, occurring two weeks before WrestleMania 42.

== Production ==
=== Background ===
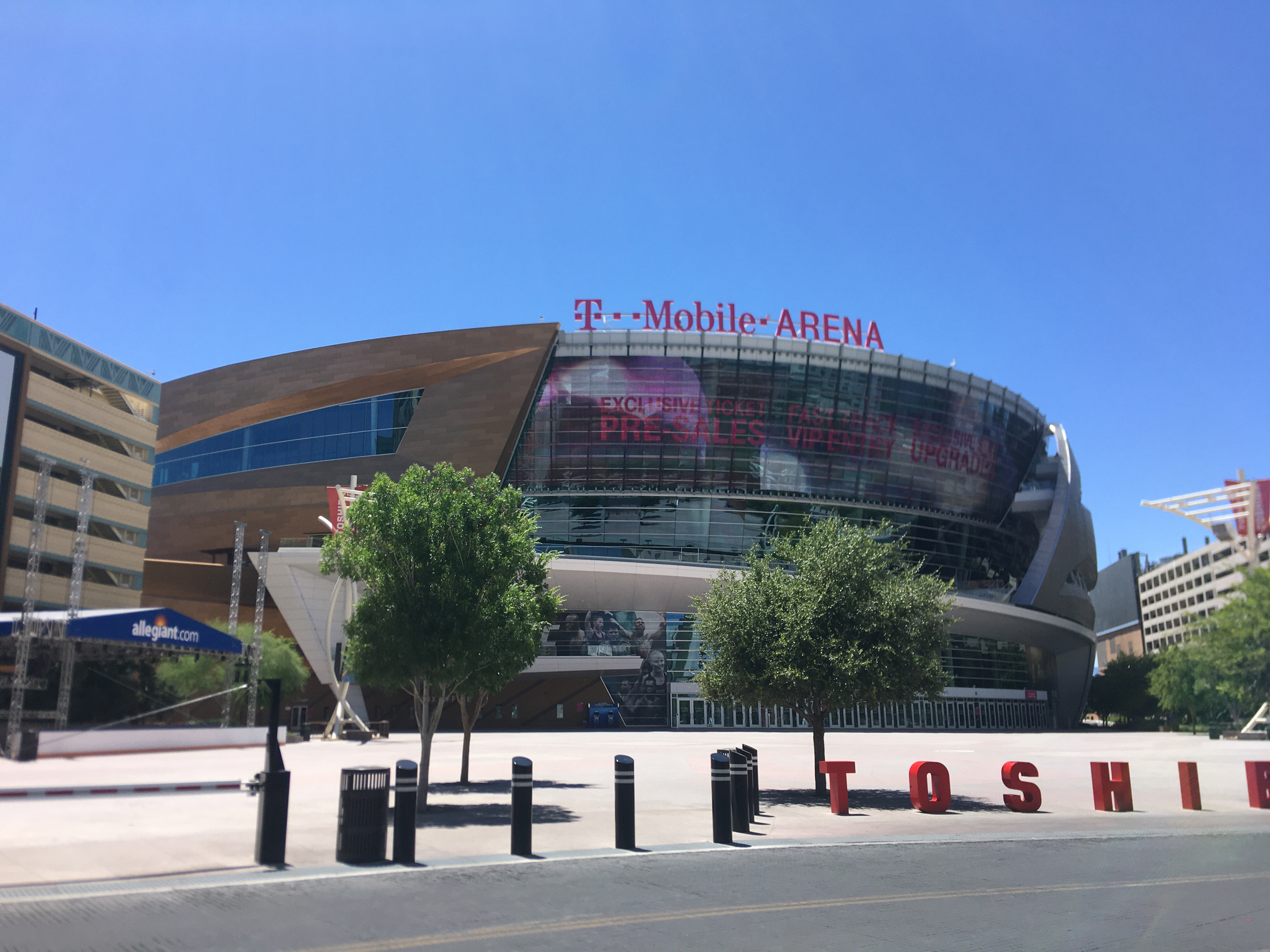
The fifth annual Stand & Deliver was held at the T-Mobile Arena on the Las Vegas Strip in Paradise, Nevada.

Stand & Deliver is an annual professional wrestling premium live event (PLE) held during WrestleMania week by WWE for its developmental brand, NXT, since 2021 and is considered NXT's biggest event of the year. On January 30, 2025, NXT's fifth Stand & Deliver was announced to be held on Saturday, April 19, 2025, at the T-Mobile Arena in the Las Vegas suburb of Paradise, Nevada, taking place the same day as WrestleMania 41 Night 1. The event was promoted as NXT Stand & Deliver: Las Vegas and had a special start time of 10:00 a.m. Pacific Time (1:00 p.m. Eastern Time). Beginning with Halloween Havoc in 2024, all major NXT events were branded solely with the WWE logo instead of the NXT logo, marking the first and only Stand & Deliver to just use the promotion's logo.

=== Broadcast outlets ===
The PLE was broadcast on WWE's livestreaming platforms. These included Peacock in the United States, Disney+ in the Philippines, SuperSport in Sub-Saharan Africa, Abema in Japan, Netflix in most other international markets, and the WWE Network in a select few countries that had not yet transferred to Netflix due to pre-existing contracts. This marked the first Stand & Deliver to livestream on Netflix following the WWE Network's merger under the service in January 2025 in those areas.

=== Storylines ===
The event included seven matches that resulted from scripted storylines. Results were predetermined by WWE's writers on the NXT brand, while storylines were produced on WWE's weekly television program, NXT.

==== Main event ====
At NXT: New Year's Evil, Oba Femi defeated previous champion Trick Williams and Eddy Thorpe in a triple threat match to win the NXT Championship. Williams subsequently began feuding with Thorpe as part of a quest to regain the title. During this time, Williams and Je'Von Evans engaged in several confrontations, with Williams warning Evans to stay out of his way and that he was not ready to be champion. On the March 18 episode of NXT, Williams defeated Thorpe in an NXT Underground match to end their feud. After the match, Williams called out Femi before both men were surrounded by DarkState (Dion Lennox, Cutler James, Osiris Griffin, and Saquon Shugars), who had attacked Femi at Vengeance Day in their debut and Evans at Roadblock after their respective matches. Femi and Williams then engaged in a brawl before Evans appeared and dropped Femi. The following week, Evans challenged Lexis King for the NXT Heritage Cup, but lost the match via countout after interference from Femi. After the match, Femi and Evans, once again surrounded by DarkState, engaged in a brawl before Williams appeared and dropped Evans. On the April 1 episode, Williams called out Femi once again before Evans interrupted, also wanting a title match. NXT General Manager Ava announced that Femi would defend the title against both Williams and Evans in a triple threat match at Stand & Deliver. Afterwards, all three men were attacked by DarkState. Later that night, it was announced that the match would main event Stand & Deliver.

==== Undercard matches ====
At Vengeance Day, Stephanie Vaquer won the NXT Women's North American Championship by defeating Fallon Henley, and then won the NXT Women's Championship by defeating Giulia in a Winner Takes All match at NXT: Roadblock the following month, becoming the first-ever women's double champion in NXT history. On the April 1 episode of NXT, General Manager Ava announced that Vaquer would vacate the NXT Women's North American Championship due to holding the NXT Women's Championship and to also give more opportunities to the NXT women's division. It was then announced that the next champion would be determined by a six-woman ladder match at Stand & Deliver. Qualifying matches began that night, with Zaria and Kelani Jordan becoming the first and second qualified by defeating Lash Legend and Roxanne Perez, respectively. On the following episode, Sol Ruca and Izzi Dame became the third and fourth qualified by defeating Jazmyn Nyx and Wren Sinclair, respectively. On the April 15 episode, Lola Vice and a returning Thea Hail became the fifth and sixth qualified by defeating Tatum Paxley and Karmen Petrovic, respectively.

At NXT: Roadblock, Stephanie Vaquer defeated Giulia in a Winner Takes All match to win the NXT Women's Championship, while also retaining the NXT Women's North American Championship. On the following episode during Vaquer's celebration, Jordynne Grace interrupted her, seemingly wanting a title match, before being attacked by Jaida Parker, stating that she would be the next challenger. On the following episode, Vaquer successfully defended her NXT Women's Championship against Parker after she was distracted by Grace. On the April 1 episode, in deciding to relinquish the NXT Women's North American Championship, Vaquer agreed with NXT General Manager Ava's decision under one condition: Vaquer could select her own opponent for the NXT Women's Championship at Stand & Deliver and Ava complied. Vaquer was interrupted by both Grace and Parker, and after some exchange of words, a brawl ensued between the two women. After another brawl at the backstage, it was announced that Grace would face Parker the following week. There, the match ended in a no-contest after inteference from Vaquer. After that, Vaquer was attacked by both Grace and Parker, who was saved by a returning Giulia, who would then turn on Vaquer and attacked her, turning heel in the process. Later that night, Giulia challenged Vaquer to a rematch at Stand & Deliver, with Vaquer then announcing that she would defend the NXT Women's Championship against Giulia, Grace, and Parker in a fatal four-way match.

Throughout late March and early April, Hank and Tank (Hank Walker and Tank Ledger) suffered an identity crisis and went on a losing streak against several NXT tag teams. After losing another match on the April 8 episode of NXT, Hank and Tank expressed their frustration before getting a pep talk from SmackDown's WWE Tag Team Champions The Street Profits (Angelo Dawkins and Montez Ford), who announced that the winners of a tag team gauntlet match the following week would face Fraxiom (Nathan Frazer and Axiom) for the NXT Tag Team Championship at Stand & Deliver. The match was won by Hank and Tank.

After making his NXT debut on the February 11 episode, Ricky Saints embarked on a quest to make a name for himself in NXT. During this time, Saints would have several confrontations with former All Elite Wrestling colleague Ethan Page, who called Saints an 'outsider' despite Page himself debuting in NXT in similar fashion the previous year. On the April 1 episode of NXT, Saints defeated Shawn Spears to win the NXT North American Championship. During his celebration, Saints was attacked by Page, who posed with the title afterwards. On the next episode, Saints celebrated his title win once again, but demanded Page to come out and face him. However, NXT Heritage Cup Champion Lexis King, Eddy Thorpe, and Wes Lee interrupted and discussed why they were deserving of title matches. Afterwards, Saints was attacked by Page from behind. A brawl subsequently ensued between King, Thorpe, Lee, and Page. Later that night, it was announced that a fatal four-way match would take place the following week, where the winner would face Saints for the title at Stand & Deliver. The match was won by Page.

On the April 8 episode of NXT, Meta-Four (Lash Legend and Jakara Jackson), Fatal Influence (Fallon Henley, Jacy Jayne, and Jazmyn Nyx), and Roxanne Perez went to talk to NXT General Manager Ava about a Last Chance match for a spot in the NXT Women's North American Championship Ladder match at Stand & Deliver, but Ava announced that there would be no last chance, much to the dismay of all the women. Perez demanded to compete at the event, with Ava then saying that she had an idea for a match at the event, with Perez stating that it would be better to not be a tag team match since she would not have a partner. On the next episode, Ava announced that Meta-Four, Fatal Influence, and Gigi Dolin and Tatum Paxley would compete in a triple threat tag team match to determine the #1 contender for the WWE Women's Tag Team Championship on the April 22 episode of NXT, with Ava stating that if Perez found a partner, the match would be a fatal four-way tag team match. Later that night, it was announced that Cora Jade would be Perez's partner, while it was also announced that the match would be an elimination match and it would take place on the Countdown to Stand & Deliver pre-show.

After losing the NXT North American Championship, Tony D'Angelo allowed his underboss, Channing "Stacks" Lorenzo, to assume more of a leadership role within The D'Angelo Family. On the March 18 episode of NXT, Lorenzo, Luca Crusifino, and Adriana Rizzo competed in a six-person mixed tag team match as D'Angelo watched backstage. He was subsequently attacked by DarkState (Dion Lennox, Cutler James, Saquon Shugars, and Osiris Griffin), distracting the group long enough to cost them the match. After gathering more intel on DarkState, on the April 8 episode of NXT, Lorenzo challenged DarkState to meet him in the parking lot the following week unbeknownst to D'Angelo, where he and Crusifino engaged in a vicious brawl with DarkState, who got the upper hand until D'Angelo arrived to even the odds. D'Angelo confronted Lorenzo for not consulting him about this plan, saying they would not handle DarkState in a parking lot, but instead at Stand & Deliver. Later that night, it was announced that D'Angelo, Lorenzo, and Crusifino would face three members of DarkState in a six-man tag team match at Stand & Deliver.

== Event ==
Other on-screen personnel
Role:	Name:
Commentators	Vic Joseph
Commentators	Corey Graves
Commentators	Booker T
Spanish commentators	Marcelo Rodríguez
Spanish commentators	Jerry Soto
Ring announcer	Mike Rome
Referees	Adrian Butler
Referees	Chip Danning
Referees	Dallas Irvin
Referees	Derek Sanders
Referees	Felix Fernandez
Interviewer	Sarah Schreiber
Pre-show panel	Megan Morant
Pre-show panel	Sam Roberts

=== Pre-show ===
On the Countdown to Stand & Deliver pre-show, Meta-Four (Lash Legend and Jakara Jackson), Fatal Influence (Jacy Jayne and Fallon Henley, accompanied by Jazmyn Nyx), Gigi Dolin and Tatum Paxley (accompanied by Shotzi), and Cora Jade and Roxanne Perez competed in a fatal four-way tag team elimination match to determine the number one contenders for the WWE Women's Tag Team Championship. Meta-Four was eliminated after Perez performed Pop Rox on Legend. Perez walked out on Jade, allowing Dolin and Paxley to pin Jade. Dolin and Paxley scored the final elimination with the Cemetery Driver on Jayne to win the match.

=== Preliminary matches ===
The actual PLE began with Ricky Saints defending the NXT North American Championship against Ethan Page. During the match, Saints leapt off the ropes, but Page sent him onto the announce table. Inside the ring, Page applied a Boston Crab on Saints, who reached the ropes to break the hold. Page performed a powerslam on Saints for a nearfall. Saints performed a powerbomb on Page for a nearfall. Page performed the Ego's Edge on Saints for a nearfall. Saints performed a Spear and the Roshambo on Page to retain the title.

In the second match, Fraxiom (Nathan Frazer and Axiom) defended the NXT Tag Team Championship against Hank and Tank (Hank Walker and Tank Ledger). In the climax, Axiom performed a Spanish Fly on Walker followed by a Phoenix Splash from Frazer, but Ledger broke up the pin. Ledger performed a suicide dive on Axiom and back inside, Hank and Tank performed a high/low powerslam on Frazer to win the title.

After that was the ladder match for the vacant NXT North American Championship, featuring Izzi Dame, Kelani Jordan, Lola Vice, Sol Ruca, Thea Hail, and Zaria. Hail had her hands on the belt, but Dame pulled the ladder away. Afterwards, The Culling (Shawn Spears, Brooks Jensen, and Niko Vance) showed up and Zaria pushed Hail into them. Vice pushed Ruca and Jordan off a bridged ladder before applying a sleeper hold on Zaria. Jordan performed a splash on Vice and attempted to climb the ladder, but Ruca springboarded on the other side. Zaria pulled Jordan off the ladder and sent her to the other wrestlers outside the ring. Zaria and Ruca attempted to befriend each other but fought on top of the ladder. Ruca then kicked Zaria off but was stopped by Dame. Ruca then performed Sol Snatchers on everyone and retrieved the belt to win the title to become a double champion.

In the fourth match, The D'Angelo Family (Tony D'Angelo, Channing "Stacks" Lorenzo, and Luca Crusifino, accompanied by Adriana Rizzo) took on DarkState (Dion Lennox, Osiris Griffin, and Saquon Shugars, accompanied by Cutler James). The ending of the match came when Lorenzo betrayed D'Angelo by attacking him with a low blow, allowing Shugars to perform a pop-up powerbomb on D'Angelo to win the match.

In the penultimate match, Stephanie Vaquer defended the NXT Women's Championship against Giulia, Jaida Parker, and Jordynne Grace in a fatal four-way match. All four women had control of the match at different points. They applied submission moves on each other, and Vaquer then dominated Grace, Giulia, and Parker. Vaquer performed a suplex on Grace and slammed her into the ring mat multiple times. Giulia rolled up Parker for a nearfall. Parker performed a Gourd Buster and Hip Notic on Giulia, but Vaquer broke up the pin with a Spiral Tap and pinned Parker following a Package Shoulder Breaker to retain the title.

=== Main event ===
In the main event, Oba Femi defended the NXT Championship against Je'Von Evans and Trick Williams. All men executed their signature offense throughout the match, with Femi dominating most of the time. Evans performed a top-rope cutter on Femi for a nearfall. Williams pulled the referee out of the ring. Femi sent Evans through the barricade. Williams performed a Rock Bottom on Femi through the announce table. Williams performed the Trick Shot, but as the referee recovered, Femi knocked him out and broke up the pin before three. Williams performed the Trick Shot on Evans but Femi performed a Fall from Grace on Williams onto Evans before performing the same move on Evans to retain the title.

== Reception ==
Reviewing the show for the Wrestling Observer Newsletter, Dave Meltzer gave the pre-show match 3.25 stars, the NXT North American Championship bout 3.5 stars, the NXT Tag Team Championship bout 4.25 stars, the Women's North American Championship bout 3.5 stars, the DarkState/D'Angelo Family bout 3 stars (the lowest rating of the night), the NXT Women's Championship bout 4 stars, and the NXT Championship bout 4.5 stars (the highest rating of the night).

The show would later go on to win the 2025 NXT Year-End Award for Best PLE/Show of the Year.

== Aftermath ==
Gigi Dolin and Tatum Paxley had their match for the WWE Women's Tag Team Championship against Liv Morgan and Raquel Rodriguez on the following episode of NXT, but the champions retained.

Also on NXT, Stephanie Vaquer defeated Roxanne Perez to retain the NXT Women's Championship, and was confronted by Giulia and Jordynne Grace after the match. The following week, a match between Giulia and Grace was scheduled for the May 6 episode, where the winner would face Vaquer for the title at Battleground. The match was won by Grace.

Over the following weeks, Luca Crusifino disappeared while Adriana Rizzo went into hiding at a safe house per Tony D'Angelo's request. On the April 29 episode of NXT, D'Angelo stated that Channing "Stacks" Lorenzo's impulsivity put the group in danger and vowed to get revenge. Lorenzo responded via satellite and stated that D'Angelo had grown soft and was no longer capable of leading the group. Two weeks later, D'Angelo competed against Wes Lee, where Lorenzo appeared via satellite from outside of Rizzo's safe house, distracting D'Angelo long enough to cost him the match. Later that night, D'Angelo arrived at the safe house, only to be ambushed by Lorenzo, who stated that he would end D'Angelo at Battleground, which was made official.

On the April 29 episode of NXT, Kelani Jordan mocked NXT Women's North American Champion Sol Ruca and Zaria, stating that when she was champion, she defended the title every week. Ruca was about to agree to defend the title when Zaria interrupted, stating that Jordan would have to face her first. A match between Jordan and Zaria took place the following week, where Zaria won. A rematch was then scheduled for the May 20 episode, with the winner facing Ruca for the title at Battleground, which was won by Jordan.

This was Fraxiom's (Nathan Frazer and Axiom) final match as part of the NXT brand, as they were called up to the main roster on SmackDown on the April 25 episode of SmackDown. A month later on the May 16 episode of SmackDown, Giulia officially was also called up to the brand.

In addition, this would also be the final NXT event to feature Cora Jade, Jakara Jackson, and Gigi Dolin as they were released from their contracts on May 2.

This would be the last Stand & Deliver to be held during the week of WrestleMania as the 2026 event was a standalone event, occurring two weeks before WrestleMania 42.

=== Broadcasting changes ===
In continuing WWE's near worldwide transition to Netflix, this would be the final Stand & Deliver to air on Disney+ in the Philippines before moving to Netflix on January 1, 2026. Throughout 2025, many of the select few countries that were still on the WWE Network due to pre-existing contracts gradually merged to Netflix with nearly all international markets on Netflix by January 1, 2026. The last few remaining countries that were still on the WWE Network merged under Netflix on April 1, 2026, making this 2025 event the last Stand & Deliver to air on the WWE Network in any country. This would also be the last Stand & Deliver to livestream on Peacock in the United States as WWE's contract for NXT's PLEs on the service expired in March 2026 with the 2026 event livestreamed on YouTube in the US.

== Results ==
No.	Results	Stipulations	Times
1^{P}	Gigi Dolin and Tatum Paxley (with Shotzi) defeated Cora Jade and Roxanne Perez, Fatal Influence (Fallon Henley and Jacy Jayne) (with Jazmyn Nyx), and Meta-Four (Lash Legend and Jakara Jackson) by pinfall	Fatal four-way tag team elimination match to determine the #1 contenders for the WWE Women's Tag Team Championship	12:51
2	Ricky Saints (c) defeated Ethan Page by pinfall	Singles match for the NXT North American Championship	12:43
3	Hank and Tank (Hank Walker and Tank Ledger) defeated Fraxiom (Nathan Frazer and Axiom) (c) by pinfall	Tag team match for the NXT Tag Team Championship	13:56
4	Sol Ruca defeated Izzi Dame, Kelani Jordan, Lola Vice, Thea Hail, and Zaria by retrieving the championship belt	Ladder match for the vacant NXT Women's North American Championship	14:40
5	DarkState (Dion Lennox, Osiris Griffin, and Saquon Shugars) (with Cutler James) defeated The D'Angelo Family (Tony D'Angelo, Channing "Stacks" Lorenzo, and Luca Crusifino) (with Adriana Rizzo) by pinfall	Six-man tag team match	13:13
6	Stephanie Vaquer (c) defeated Giulia, Jaida Parker, and Jordynne Grace by pinfall	Fatal four-way match for the NXT Women's Championship	16:29
7	Oba Femi (c) defeated Je'Von Evans and Trick Williams by pinfall	Triple threat match for the NXT Championship	16:58
(c) / – the champion(s) heading into the match; P / – the match was broadcast on the pre-show

=== Fatal four-way tag team elimination match ===
Elimination	Wrestler	Team	Eliminated by	Elimination move	Times
1	Lash Legend	Meta-Four	Roxanne Perez	Pinned after Pop Rox	7:30
2	Cora Jade	Cora Jade and Roxanne Perez	Gigi Dolin and Tatum Paxley	Pinned with an assisted roll-up	9:20
3	Jacy Jayne	Fatal Influence	Tatum Paxley	Pinned after Cemetery Drive	12:51
Winners:	Gigi Dolin and Tatum Paxley		—N/a		12:51

=== Vacated NXT Women's North American Championship Tournament ===
Qualifiers; NXT; April 1-15, 2024
Zaria	Pinfall
Lash Legend	11:47
Roxanne Perez	14:40
Kelani Jordan	Pinfall
Sol Ruca	Pinfall
Jazmyn Nyx	5:03
Izzi Dame	Pinfall
Wren Sinclair	4:27
Lola Vice	Pinfall
Tatum Paxley	9:56
Karmen Petrovic	2:40
Thea Hail	Submission

Championship match Stand & Deliver; April 19, 2024
Zaria	14:40
Kelani Jordan	—
Sol Ruca	Win
Izzi Dame	—
Lola Vice	—
Thea Hail	—
