= Booker T World Gym Arena =

Professional wrestling arena in Texas City, Texas

- Interactive map of Booker T World Gym Arena
- Address: 10000 Emmett F. Lowry Expressway, Suite 1152
- Location: Texas City, Texas 77591; United States
- Coordinates: 29°24′22″N 95°1′32″W
- Owner: Booker T. Huffman Jr. Sharmell Sullivan-Huffman

Construction
- Opened: 2012
- Closed: 2024

Tenant
- Reality of Wrestling (2012–2024)

Website
- https://realityofwrestling.com/

The Booker T World Gym Arena was an arena located in Texas City, Texas inside the Mainland City Centre. The arena was home to the Reality of Wrestling promotion and its eponymous professional wrestling school from 2012 to 2024.

== History ==
In 2012, Booker T, a multi-time World Championship Wrestling (WCW), WWE, and Total Nonstop Action Wrestling (TNA) champion re-launched the Pro Wrestling Alliance (PWA) as Reality of Wrestling (ROW). The promotion's first event took place at the arena on March 9, 2012. On December 24, 2013, the arena hosted its first pay-per-view event in which the main event was an ROW Heavyweight Championship match between Gustavo Mendoza and The Pride. On April 30, 2016, the arena held its first boxing event with Gene Hill fighting against Homero Fonseca for the WBA Intercontinental Championship. On February 17, 2018, the arena held its first co-promoted professional wrestling event when Reality of Wrestling teamed up with the Title Match Network to present Ladies Night Out. On July 9, 2019, the arena held Reality of Wrestling and Impact Wrestling's Deep Impact event.

In January 2024, Reality of Wrestling partnered with Walker Texas Lawyer, a personal injury firm headquartered in Houston, Texas to launch the Walker Texas Lawyer Arena which would serve as the new home of the promotion's television tapings, major events, and its school and training facilities. On August 9, 2024, Reality of Wrestling relocated to the Walker Texas Lawyer Arena which opened its doors in partnership with the Texas City-La Marque Chamber of Commerce. No events have been held at the World Gym Arena since.
