= NXT Stand & Deliver (2024) =

WWE premium live event

- Promotional poster featuring Roxanne Perez, Carmelo Hayes, Ilja Dragunov, Tony D'Angelo, Trick Williams, and Lyra Valkyria
- Promotion: WWE
- Brand: NXT
- Date: April 6, 2024
- City: Philadelphia, Pennsylvania
- Venue: Wells Fargo Center
- Attendance: 16,545

WWE event chronology
← Previous; Elimination Chamber	Next → WrestleMania XL

NXT Stand & Deliver chronology
← Previous; 2023	Next → 2025

NXT major events chronology
← Previous; Vengeance Day	Next → Battleground

The 2024 NXT Stand & Deliver was a professional wrestling premium live event (PLE) produced by WWE, held exclusively for wrestlers from the promotion's developmental brand, NXT. It was the fourth annual Stand & Deliver and took place on Saturday, April 6, 2024, at the Wells Fargo Center in Philadelphia, Pennsylvania. The event was held as a part of WrestleMania Weekend, occurring the same day as WrestleMania XL Night 1 with a special start time of 12:00 p.m. Eastern Time. Meta-Four (Noam Dar, Oro Mensah, Lash Legend, and Jakara Jackson) served as the hosts of the event.

Seven matches were contested at the event, including one on the Countdown to Stand & Deliver pre-show; this was WWE's first PLE to title its pre-show as "Countdown". In the main event, Trick Williams defeated Carmelo Hayes. In other prominent matches, Ilja Dragunov defeated Tony D'Angelo to retain the NXT Championship and Roxanne Perez defeated Lyra Valkyria to win the NXT Women's Championship. The event was also notable for the announcement of a new NXT Women's North American Championship and an appearance by new WWE signee Giulia, who previously performed in World Wonder Ring Stardom.

This was the first Stand & Deliver to livestream on Abema in Japan. It was also the final Stand & Deliver to air on Disney+ Hotstar in Indonesia, Binge in Australia, and the standalone WWE Network in most other international markets, as WWE's content in those areas moved to Netflix in January 2025, as well as the last on SonyLIV in India, which moved to Netflix in April 2025.

== Production ==
=== Background ===
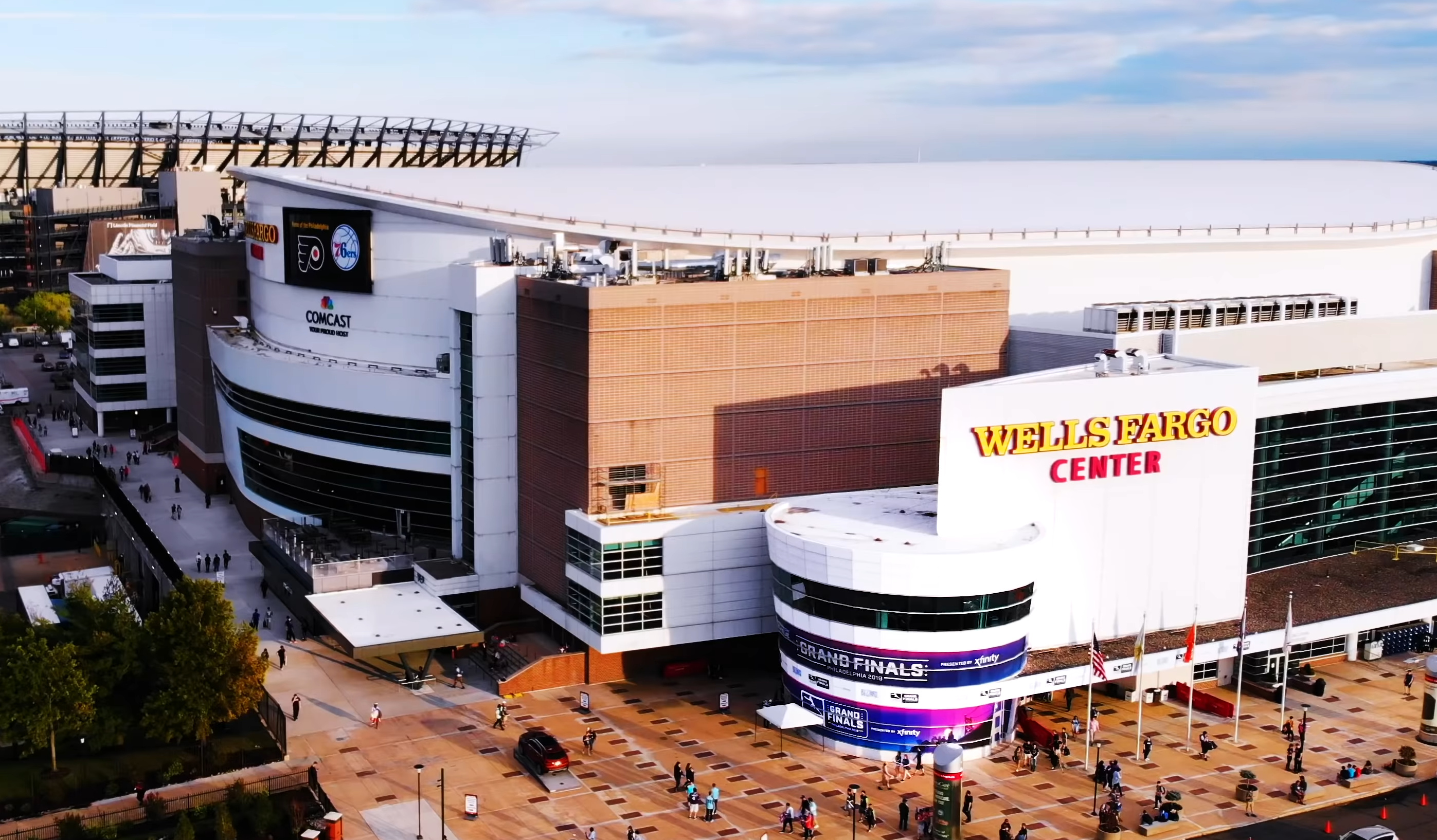
The fourth annual Stand & Deliver was held at the Wells Fargo Center in Philadelphia, Pennsylvania.

Stand & Deliver is an annual professional wrestling premium live event (PLE) held during WrestleMania week by WWE for its developmental brand, NXT, since 2021 and is considered NXT's biggest event of the year. On November 8, 2023, WWE announced that the fourth Stand & Deliver would be held on Saturday, April 6, 2024, at the Wells Fargo Center in Philadelphia, Pennsylvania. It took place during the afternoon of WrestleMania XL Night 1 with a special start time of 12:00 p.m. Eastern Time. Tickets went on sale on November 17.

=== Broadcast outlets ===
The PLE was broadcast on WWE's livestreaming platforms. These included Peacock in the United States, SonyLIV in India, Disney+ Hotstar in Indonesia, Disney+ in the Philippines, Binge in Australia, Abema in Japan, and the WWE Network everywhere else. This was the first Stand & Deliver to livestream on Abema after the Japanese version of the WWE Network merged under Abema in October 2023.

Following an announcement made on January 23, this was the final Stand & Deliver to air on the standalone WWE Network in most international markets where it was still available, as well as Disney+ Hotstar and Binge, as its content moved to Netflix in January 2025; a select few territories maintained the standalone WWE Network until early 2026 due to pre-existing contracts before they also merged under Netflix when those contracts expired.

=== Storylines ===
The PLE had six matches, with one additional occurring on the pre-show, that result from scripted storylines. Results were predetermined by WWE's writers on the NXT brand, while storylines were produced on WWE's weekly television program, NXT, and the supplementary online streaming show, Level Up.

==== Main event ====
At Vengeance Day on February 4, Trick Williams, who was accompanied by Carmelo Hayes, failed to win the NXT Championship from Ilja Dragunov. After the match, Hayes attacked Williams with a steel chair, ending their partnership and turning heel in the process. On the following episode of NXT, Hayes revealed that he was the one who attacked Williams back in October 2023 and set his sights at Dragunov and the NXT Championship. On the February 27 episode of NXT, Tony D'Angelo told Dragunov that he was tired that the NXT Championship was being centered around Dragunov, Hayes, and Williams, and that he was willing to earn a title shot at the NXT Championship. Dragunov accepted D'Angelo's proposal and NXT General Manager Ava set a match between Hayes and D'Angelo at NXT: Roadblock to determine a #1 contender to the NXT Championship at Stand & Deliver, which was won by D'Angelo. After the match, Williams made his return and attacked Hayes in the ring. The following week on NXT, Williams challenged Hayes to a match at Stand & Deliver, which was then made official. On March 28, Shawn Michaels announced that the match was given a main event spot at Stand & Deliver, making Hayes and Williams the first two Black men to main event Stand & Deliver and the first two Black men to main event a PLE since The Rock and Booker T at SummerSlam in 2001.

==== Undercard matches ====
On March 5, NXT General Manager Ava announced that three tag team matches would take place over the next three weeks, with Latino World Order (Joaquin Wilde and Cruz Del Toro) from SmackDown vs. OTM (Bronco Nima and Lucien Price), Axiom and Nathan Frazer vs. No Quarter Catch Crew (Drew Gulak, Damon Kemp, or Myles Borne), and Hank Walker and Tank Ledger vs. The O.C. (Luke Gallows and Karl Anderson) from SmackDown. The winners of each match would advance to a triple threat tag team match on the April 2 episode of NXT. Axiom and Frazer won the match to earn an NXT Tag Team Championship match against Baron Corbin and Bron Breakker at Stand & Deliver.

At Vengeance Day on February 4, Lyra Valkyria defeated Roxanne Perez and Lola Vice in a triple threat match to retain the NXT Women's Championship; the match was originally a singles match between Valkyria and Perez, however, Vice cashed in her Breakout Tournament contract while the match was in progress to convert it into a triple threat. Over the next few weeks, Perez became increasingly frustrated in the women's locker room for not receiving a rematch. At NXT: Roadblock, after Valkyria and her tag team partner Tatum Paxley failed to win the WWE Women's Tag Team Championship, Perez viciously attacked Valkyria and injured her arm, turning heel in the process. The following week on NXT, Perez demanded NXT General Manager Ava to strip Valkyria of the title due to her injury and award it to her as "the woman that never lost the title in the first place", but Ava declined, wanting to wait to get the full extent of Valkyria's injury. One week later, Perez defeated Paxley via submission. After the match, Valkyria returned and brawled with Perez, but the latter got the upper hand. Despite her injury, Valkyria told Ava she wanted a match against Perez for the title at Stand & Deliver, which was made official.

On the March 12 episode of NXT, Dijak confronted NXT North American Champion Oba Femi and challenged him to see if Femi had what it took "to be a real champion". Later that night, Femi defeated Brooks Jensen to retain the title. The following week, Jensen's tag team partner, Josh Briggs, took issue with Femi's lack of mercy towards Jensen and challenged him to a title match. Dijak then appeared and demanded a title match. A brawl then ensued among the three. One week later, Dijak and Briggs won their respective matches. Femi then announced he would defend his title against Dijak and Briggs in a triple threat match at Stand & Deliver, which was made official.

On the August 15, 2023, episode of NXT, Jacy Jayne defeated Chase University's Thea Hail. Backstage after the match, Jayne gave praise to Hail and subsequently became a mentor to Hail, turning face for the first time since 2021, with Jayne eventually joining Chase University. Around January 2024, Jayne took on a new protégé, Jazmyn Nyx, who would help Jayne win matches by cheating which Hail refused to do. On the March 12, 2024, episode of NXT, Hail and Fallon Henley lost a tag team match after Jayne refused to be Hail's partner the previous week. An emotional Hail stated how she had changed her entire look and personality to be more like Jayne, whom she idolized, but had realized how toxic Jayne really was, disavowing her friendship with Jayne and declaring she was returning to the "old Thea Hail". The following week, Jayne (with Nyx) turned on Chase University, turning both women heel in the process (Jayne, for the first time since 2023, and Nyx, for the first time in her WWE career). On April 2, a six-woman tag team match was made official for Stand & Deliver with Hail, Henley, and Kelani Jordan going against Jayne, Kiana James, and Izzi Dame.

==== Countdown to Stand & Deliver pre-show ====
On the March 26 episode of NXT, Joe Gacy collected Shawn Spears's signature steel chair during the latter's match with Dijak, which he would go on to lose. Later in the night, Spears was being interviewed outside the building and said that Gacy was now on his radar. Gacy then dropped Spears's chair from the top of the WWE Performance Center onto the pavement and then started laughing. The following week, Gacy was scheduled to face NXT North American Champion Oba Femi in a non-title match, but during Gacy's entrance, Spears attacked him with a chair from behind and told Gacy to "start laughing"; Gacy would later lose the match. Later in the night, Gacy went to Ava's office and requested a match against Spears for Stand & Deliver, which Ava accepted. The match was then made official for the Countdown to Stand & Deliver pre-show; this was WWE's first PLE to title the pre-show as "Countdown" as they were previously called "Kickoff" and simply "Pre-Show" before that.

== Event ==
Other on-screen personnel
Role:	Name:
Host	Meta-Four (Noam Dar, Oro Mensah, Lash Legend, and Jakara Jackson)
Commentators	Vic Joseph
Commentators	Booker T
Commentators	Wade Barrett
Spanish commentators	Marcelo Rodríguez
Spanish commentators	Jerry Soto
Ring announcer	Alicia Taylor
Referees	Adrian Butler
Referees	Chip Danning
Referees	Dallas Irvin
Referees	Derek Sanders
Referees	Felix Fernandez
Referees	Jeremy Marcus
Pre-show panel	Megan Morant
Pre-show panel	Sam Roberts
Pre-show panel	Arianna Grace
Pre-show panel	Ridge Holland

=== Pre-show ===
In the only match on the Countdown to Stand & Deliver pre-show, Joe Gacy faced Shawn Spears. During Gacy's entrance, Ridge Holland attacked him with a chair, but Gacy told the referee he was still able to compete. In the opening stages, Spears delivered a backbreaker to Gacy. Spears then locked in a Boston Crab, but Gacy escaped and delivered a top-rope crossbody for a two-count. Gacy then delivered a German suplex and a Lionsault to Spears for a two-count. Spears attempted a C4, but Gacy escaped and delivered a uranage for a two-count. Gacy attempted a swanton bomb, but Spears moved out of the way and then proceeded to deliver a Pedigree for a two-count. Spears attempted another C4, but Gacy escaped and hit The Upside Down World and pinned him to win the match.

=== Preliminary matches ===
In the PLE's opening match, Baron Corbin and Bron Breakker defended the NXT Tag Team Championship against Axiom and Nathan Frazer. In the opening stages, Frazer delivered a step-up enzeguiri and a DDT to Corbin for a two-count. Axiom then superkicked Corbin for a two-count. Corbin delivered a Burning Hammer and a brainbuster to Axiom for a two-count. Frazer performed a baseball slide to Breakker on the outside and delivered a Scorpion Death Drop and a standing shooting star press to Corbin for a two-count. Corbin delivered Deep Six to Axiom and then tagged in Breakker. Breakker attempted a Spear, but Axiom impeded it with the Golden Ratio for a two-count. Breakker them performed an avalanche Frankensteiner to Axiom and Corbin pinned him for a two-count. Axiom and Frazer then delivered an avalanche Spanish Fly/450° splash combination to Corbin for a two-count. Frazer then superkicked Corbin, allowing Axiom and Frazer to deliver the Golden Ratio/Phoenix Splash combination for a nearfall. Corbin then delivered the End of Days to Axiom and Breakker speared Frazer and pinned him to win the match.

Next, Oba Femi defended the NXT North American Championship against Josh Briggs and Dijak in a triple threat match. In the opening stages, Briggs delivered a double chokeslam to both Dijak and Femi, but Femi kicked out for a two-count. Briggs delivered a belly-to-back suplex to Femi on the ring apron. Dijak attempted a springboard clothesline, but Briggs impeded it with a big boot. Briggs then delivered an avalanche Clothesline From Hell to Dijak for a two-count. Dijak then delivered a Cyclone Boot to Briggs for a two-count. Dijak then delivered a sit-out chokeslam and a Canadian Destroyer to Briggs for a two-count. Femi then performed an avalanche Death Valley Driver to Dijak for a two-count. Dijak then delivered Feast Your Eyes to Femi for a two-count. Briggs then performed a moonsault to Femi, but Dijak superkicked him. Dijak again delivered another Feast Your Eyes to Femi, but Briggs pulled the referee out of the ring. Dijak delivered two Feast Your Eyes to Briggs for a two-count. Femi then pop-up powerbombed Dijak onto Briggs and pinned Briggs to win the match.

Next, Fallon Henley, Kelani Jordan, and Thea Hail (accompanied by Chase University (Andre Chase, Duke Hudson, and Riley Osborne) faced Jacy Jayne, Kiana James, and Izzi Dame (accompanied by Jazmyn Nyx). In the opening stages, Hail delivered a baseball dropkick to Jayne, followed by a twisting Pescado from Jordan. James then delivered a spear and a clothesline to Jordan. Dame then delivered a big boot and a backbreaker to Jordan for a two-count. James delivered an avalanche Spanish Fly to Henley for a two-count. Hail delivered a spinning DDT and a rolling senton splash to Jayne for a two-count. Dame attempted a big boot to Hail, but Hail blocked and locked in the Kimura Lock, forcing Dame to submit.

Next, NXT General Manager Ava announced that a new title, the NXT Women's North American Championship, was coming to NXT.

Next, Lyra Valkyria defended the NXT Women's Championship against Roxanne Perez. In the opening stages, Perez delivered an uppercut and a Russian legsweep to Valkyria for a two-count. Perez attempted a foot stomp, but Valkyria countered it into a roll-up pin for a two-count. Perez delivered a diving double foot stomp and a hammerlock northern lights suplex to Valkyria for a two-count. Valkyria delivered two northern lights suplexes and a fisherman buster to Perez for a two-count. Valkyria performed a running Liger Bomb to Perez for a two-count. Valkyria attempted a suicide dive, but Perez impeded her with a forearm smash; Perez them delivered a tornado DDT on the floor and then Pop Rox for a two-count. Perez performed La Mistica into a crossface submission, but Valkyria rolled her up for a two-count and then delivered a leg lariat for another two-count. Valkyria delivered a German suplex to Perez and attempted The Nightwing, but Perez reversed it into a hurricarana and then delivered Pop Rox and locked in a crossface submission, forcing Valkyria to tap out, and thus Perez won the title for a second time.

In the penultimate match, Ilja Dragunov defended the NXT Championship against Tony D'Angelo (accompanied by The D'Angelo Family Channing "Stacks" Lorenzo, Luca Crusifino, and Adriana Rizzo). In the opening stages, Dragunov delivered two german suplexes to D'Angelo, but the latter responded with a superman Punch for a two-count. Dragunov delivered a running Death Valley Driver to D'Angelo into the barricade. Dragunov then delivered a running knee and a lariat to D'Angelo for a two-count. D'Angelo attempted a spinebuster, but Dragunov countered it into a DDT for a two-count. D'Angelo delivered an overhead belly-to-belly suplex and a side belly-to-belly suplex to Dragunov. Dragunov attempted another running knee, but D'Angelo impeded with a lariat and performed a deadlift german suplex for a two-count. D'Angelo delivered an avalanche belly-to-belly suplex to Dragunov, which takes the latter to the outside. Dragunov then delivered an H-Bomb to D'Angelo through the announce table and then rolled him back in the ring and delivered a diving senton for a two-count. Dragunov then headbutted D'Angelo and delivered the Torpedo Moscow. Dragunov performed a Super H-Bomb to D'Angelo and pinned him to retain his title.

Next, Stand & Deliver hosts Meta-Four (Noam Dar, Oro Mensah, Lash Legend and Jakara Jackson) came out to announce that Philadelphia broke the all-time NXT attendance record with 16,545 fans.

=== Main event ===
In the main event, Trick Williams faced Carmelo Hayes in the first NXT main event involving two black men. In the opening stages, Williams attempted a leg lariat, but Hayes ducked and performed a springboard clothesline. Hayes them delivered a slingshot foot stomp and a sliding dropkick to Williams. Williams them delivered two leg lariats and a one-arm flapjack to Hayes. Hayes attempted Nothing But Net, but Williams dodged and delivered a leaping neckbreaker and a pump kick for a two-count. Hayes them delivered a frog splash to Williams for a two-count. Williams attempted another pump kick, but Hayes impeded it with the First 48 codebreaker for a two-count. Williams attempted to perform a Stinger Splash to Hayes in the corner, but Hayes pulled the referee in front of him and Williams inadvertently hit the referee. Hayes then grabbed a steel chair and attempted to hit Williams with it, but Williams stopped him and hit Hayes multiple times with the chair. Hayes then delivered a low blow to Williams and the original referee counted the pin, but it was just a two-count. Hayes then inadvertently hit the referee with a bicycle knee strike, allowing Hayes to hit the Nothing But Net, but the referee wasn't available to count the pin. Another referee came down and Hayes attempted to hit Williams with the chair, but the referee snatched the chair out of Hayes's hands, allowing Williams to hit the Trick Shot on Hayes and pinned him to win the match.

== Reception ==
Kevin Berge of Bleacher Report graded the show an A−, saying "The stars of NXT did not shy away from competing in front of a massive crowd, working with the spotlight. Hopefully, this night will convince more fans to show for future NXT premium live events across the United States. The best match of the night was a shocker. Oba Femi, Dijak and Josh Briggs brought it in a battle of big men that will not be soon forgotten. The spots from that match will stand up to WrestleMania's best.It all culminated in the match everyone came to see. Carmelo Hayes and Trick Williams delivered with a big-match feel that could have gone longer but absolutely never lost the crowd. While a few nitpicks keep this from being NXT's greatest show, this stands amongst the elite NXT TakeOvers as the show that should put the gold brand back on the map. WrestleMania has a tough act to follow".

Wrestling journalist Dave Meltzer of the Wrestling Observer Newsletter rated the following matches: the Gacy–Spears match 2.5 stars (the lowest rated match on the card), the NXT Tag Team Championship and the NXT North American Championship matches 4.5 stars (the highest rated match on the card), the NXT Championship match 4.25 stars, the six-woman tag bout 3 stars, the NXT Women's Championship match 3.75 stars and the main event 3.5 stars.

== Aftermath ==
In addition to the majority of countries moving to Netflix in January 2025, this would also be the final Stand & Deliver to air on SonyLIV in India following the expiration of WWE's contract with SonyLIV with India then moving to Netflix on April 1, 2025.

== Results ==
No.	Results	Stipulations	Times
1^{P}	Joe Gacy defeated Shawn Spears by pinfall	Singles match	9:04
2	Baron Corbin and Bron Breakker (c) defeated Axiom and Nathan Frazer by pinfall	Tag team match for the NXT Tag Team Championship	11:22
3	Oba Femi (c) defeated Dijak and Josh Briggs by pinfall	Triple threat match for the NXT North American Championship	15:00
4	Fallon Henley, Kelani Jordan, and Thea Hail (with Andre Chase, Duke Hudson, and Riley Osborne) defeated Izzi Dame, Jacy Jayne, and Kiana James (with Jazmyn Nyx) by submission	Six-woman tag team match	11:41
5	Roxanne Perez defeated Lyra Valkyria (c) by submission	Singles match for the NXT Women's Championship	16:19
6	Ilja Dragunov (c) defeated Tony D'Angelo (with Adriana Rizzo, Channing "Stacks" Lorenzo, and Luca Crusifino) by pinfall	Singles match for the NXT Championship	17:06
7	Trick Williams defeated Carmelo Hayes by pinfall	Singles match	14:47
(c) / – the champion(s) heading into the match; P / – the match was broadcast on the pre-show

=== NXT Tag Team Championship Eliminator Tournament ===
1st Round; NXT; March 12–19, 2024
Latino World Order (Joaquin Wilde and Cruz Del Toro)	Pinfall
OTM (Bronco Nima and Lucien Price)	10:46
Axiom and Nathan Frazer	Pinfall
No Quarter Catch Crew (Charlie Dempsey and Myles Borne)	9:32
Hank Walker and Tank Ledger	7:52
The O.C. (Luke Gallows and Karl Anderson)	Pinfall

Final; NXT; April 2, 2024
Latino World Order (Joaquin Wilde and Cruz Del Toro)	10:48
Axiom and Nathan Frazer	Pinfall
The O.C. (Luke Gallows and Karl Anderson)	—
