= Niko Vance =

American professional wrestler

Personal information
- Born: Skylor Clinton; January 15, 1999 (age 27) Prescott, Arizona, U.S.

Professional wrestling career
- Billed height: 6 ft 3 in (1.91 m)
- Billed weight: 240 lb (110 kg)
- Billed from: Prescott, Arizona
- Trained by: WWE Performance Center
- Debut: May 13, 2023

Skylor Clinton (born January 15, 1999) is an American professional wrestler. He is signed to WWE, where he performs on the NXT brand under the ring name Niko Vance and is one-half of The Culling alongside Izzi Dame. He also makes appearances for Reality of Wrestling (ROW), where he is a former one-time ROW Heavyweight Champion.

== Early life ==
Skylor Clinton was born on January 15, 1999, in Prescott, Arizona. He attended Prescott High School, where he excelled in football as a running back. During his senior year, Clinton rushed for 1,440 yards and 21 touchdowns on 188 carries and also threw four touchdown passes. His outstanding performance earned him All-Division III Honorable Mention and First Team All-Division III Section IV honors. Notably, he became the first player from Prescott to earn an FBS scholarship.

=== College football career ===
Clinton initially joined the Wyoming Cowboys as a defensive end but did not see any playing time. He subsequently transferred to Mesa Community College, where he transitioned to the wide receiver position, recording 23 receptions for 441 yards and four touchdowns. In the season finale, the Valley of the Sun Bowl against Lackawanna College, he notably recorded 100 receiving yards on three catches. Clinton then spent three seasons with the UAB Blazers football team, appearing in nine games between 2018 and 2019. He concluded his collegiate career as a tight end for Northern Arizona University, where he appeared in five games.

Throughout his academic career, Clinton was recognised as a Golden Eagle Scholar-Athlete Award recipient in 2021.

== Professional wrestling career ==
=== WWE (2023–present) ===
Clinton signed a trainee deal with WWE in late 2022. He made his in-ring debut at an NXT live event on May 13, 2023, teaming with Kale Dixon in a losing effort against Boa and Dante Chen. He made his televised debut on the September 5, 2024, episode of Main Event under his real name, facing Dante Chen in a losing effort. Shortly after, he began appearing on NXT Level Up, debuting on the September 13, 2024, episode against Luca Crusifino.

On November 12, 2024, Clinton, under the ring name Niko Vance, made his debut on NXT aligning himself with Shawn Spears and Brooks Jensen, establishing himself as a heel in the process. Vance would have his first bout in NXT on January 21, 2025, teaming with Jensen to defeat The D'Angelo Family (Luca Crusifino and Channing "Stacks" Lorenzo). On the July 22 episode of NXT, The Culling (Spears, Vance, Izzi Dame and Tatum Paxley) defeated NXT Tag Team Champions Hank and Tank (Hank Walker and Tank Ledger), Zaria, and WWE Speed Women's and NXT Women's North American Champion Sol Ruca in an eight-person mixed tag team match in The Culling's first match as a whole stable.

On the June 23, 2026 episode of NXT, Vance attacked Spears and put him through the announce table as Dame watched, kicking Spears out of the group.

=== Independent circuit (2026–present) ===
On April 10, 2026, at Reality of Wrestling's The Last Stand Rumble, Vance defeated Danny Limelight to win the ROW Heavweight Championship, the first championship win in his career. He later lost the title to Max Castellanos in a fatal four-way match at Summer of Champions XII on August 8.

== Championships and accomplishments ==
- Pro Wrestling Illustrated
  - Ranked No. 341 of the top singles wrestlers in the PWI 500 in 2026
- Reality of Wrestling
  - ROW Heavyweight Championship (1 time)
