= Izzi Dame =

American professional wrestler

Personal information
- Born: Franki Carissa Strefling; July 13, 1999 (age 27) Buchanan, Michigan, U.S.
- Education: Eastern Michigan University

Professional wrestling career
- Ring name(s): Franki Carissa; Izzi Dame
- Billed height: 5 ft 10 in (178 cm)
- Billed from: Buchanan, Michigan
- Trained by: WWE Performance Center
- Debut: May 19, 2023

Franki Carissa Strefling (born July 13, 1999) is an American professional wrestler and former professional volleyball player. She is signed to WWE, where she performs on the NXT brand under the ring name Izzi Dame and is the second leader of The Culling. She is a former one-time NXT Women's North American Champion.

== Early life ==
Strefling is from Buchanan, Michigan. She attended Eastern Michigan University and graduated with a bachelor's degree in business management. She also played on the volleyball team as part of the Eastern Michigan Eagles.

== Professional wrestling career ==
=== WWE (2022–present) ===
==== Early beginnings (2022–2024) ====
On November 10, 2022, Strefling was announced as having signed with WWE as part of the WWE Performance Center Fall 2022 Rookie Class. She made her in-ring debut on the May 19, 2023 NXT live event, losing to Lola Vice. On the July 21 episode of NXT Level Up, now under the ring name Izzi Dame, she made her televised in-ring debut losing to Dani Palmer. In September, Dame was announced as an entrant in the NXT Women's Breakout Tournament. She was defeated in the first round by Kelani Jordan on the October 3 episode of NXT. On the November 28 episode of NXT, Dame would defend Kiana James in an argument with Roxanne Perez backstage and shoved Perez which led to Perez striking her and a brawl ensuing. At NXT Deadline, she would help James defeat Perez in a Steel Cage match, forming an alliance with James and establishing herself as a heel. At NXT Vengeance Day, Dame and James revealed their intentions of targeting Kelani Jordan. Dame would pick her first singles win on the February 16, 2024, episode of NXT Level Up by defeating Gigi Dolin with assistance from James. On the February 20 episode of NXT, Dame and James attempted to launch a sneak attack on Jordan but Jordan outsmarted them. The following week, Dame helped James defeat Jordan in a singles match. On the March 12 episode of NXT, Dame and James defeated Thea Hail and Fallon Henley after Henley replaced Jordan who was found laid out backstage. At NXT Stand & Deliver, Dame and James teamed with Jacy Jayne against Henley, Hail, and Jordan in a losing effort. In the 2024 WWE Draft, James was drafted to the Raw brand while Dame remained on NXT, thus ending their alliance, and Izzi would be relegated to Level Up for the remainder of 2024.

==== The Culling (2025–present) ====
In early 2025, Dame was accepted into The D'Angelo Family (Tony D'Angelo, Channing ‘Stacks’ Lorenzo, Adriana Rizzo and Luca Crusifino) when she was stalked by Shawn Spears, who was attempting to recruit her into his stable. On the February 11 episode of NXT, D'Angelo successfully defended his NXT North American Championship against Ridge Holland in a steel cage match (which was suggested by Dame herself to D'Angelo in the prior week). After the match, Dame turned on The D'Angelo Family and sided with Spears. Spears later formed The Culling stable alongside Dame, Brooks Jensen and Niko Vance. In June, Dame attempted to recruit Tatum Paxley into The Culling. On the July 1 episode of NXT, Paxley and Dame defeated Zaria and NXT Women's North American and Speed Women's Champion Sol Ruca in a tag team match for Paxley to join The Culling. For pinning Ruca in the tag team match, Dame received a NXT Women's North American Championship match at NXT Great American Bash on July 12 but failed to defeat Ruca for the title. At Evolution on the following day, Dame and Paxley entered the 20-woman battle royal for a women's world championship match at Clash in Paris but the pair were immediately eliminated at the start of the match by Nia Jax. On the July 22 episode of NXT, The Culling defeated NXT Tag Team Champions Hank and Tank, Zaria, and Ruca in an eight-person mixed tag team match in The Culling's first match as a whole stable.

At Week 1 of NXT: Gold Rush, The Culling turned on Paxley, who won the NXT Women's Championship at NXT Halloween Havoc, in Paxley's title defense against Jayne. At NXT Deadline, Dame defeated Paxley due to distraction from The Culling. On January 6, 2026, at NXT: New Year's Evil, Dame lost to Paxley in a rematch. Later that night, Dame answered Thea Hail's open challenge for the NXT Women's North American Championship and defeated Hail to win the title, marking the first championship in her career. She would lose the title to Paxley at Vengeance Day on March 7, ending her reign at 60 days. On March 17 episode of NXT, Dame failed to regain the title from Paxley in a Steel Cage Match ending their feud.

Dame began feuding with Lola Vice on the April 21 episode of NXT, interrupting a promo to tell Vice that she was waiting for her to make a mistake that could cost her the NXT Women's Championship. When Vice argued that Dame was being hesitant by waiting, she informed Vice that she would always be "two steps ahead" of her, after which Vance ambushed Vice by trying to swipe her AAA Mixed Tag Team Championship. Dame took advantage of the distraction and kicked Vice in the head. On the April 28 episode, Spears interrupted an attempt by Vice to call out Dame for the attack, saying that The Culling was one step ahead of her; Dame and Vance subsequently ambushed Vice, only for her tag team partner Mr. Iguana to emerge from under the ring and attack them back. On the May 5 episode, Dame and Vance would defeat Vice and Mr. Iguana in a mixed tag team match. On May 26, Vice defeated Dame to retain the NXT Women's Championship.

=== Total Nonstop Action Wrestling (2024) ===
On the July 11, 2024, episode of Impact!, Dame made her surprise debut appearance in Total Nonstop Action Wrestling (TNA) to challenge TNA Knockouts World Champion Jordynne Grace for the title in a losing effort.

== Personal life ==
Strefling is in a relationship with fellow professional wrestler Bronson Rechsteiner, professionally known as Bron Breakker.

== Championships and accomplishments ==
- Pro Wrestling Illustrated
  - Ranked No. 109 of the top 250 female wrestlers in the PWI Women's 250 in 2025
- WWE
  - NXT Women's North American Championship (1 time)
