= Walker Texas Lawyer Arena =

Professional wrestling arena in Texas City, Texas

- Interactive map of Walker Texas Lawyer Arena
- Location: 9300 E.F. Lowry Expressway, Suite 50, Texas City, Texas 77591; United States
- Coordinates: 29.404189°N 95.01489996654182°W
- Owner: Booker T. Huffman Jr. Sharmell Sullivan-Huffman

Construction
- Opened: 2024

Tenant
- Reality of Wrestling (2024–present)

Website
- https://realityofwrestling.com/

The Walker Texas Lawyer Arena is an arena located in Texas City, Texas and is primarily used for professional wrestling. The arena is currently home to the Reality of Wrestling promotion and its eponymous professional wrestling school.

== History ==
Beginning in 2012, Reality of Wrestling had primarily held its events at the Booker T. World Gym Arena, an arena located inside the Mainland City Centre in Texas City, Texas which also served as the promotion's in-house professional wrestling school and training facility. The World Gym Arena also held events for other promotions such as Impact Wrestling and Rise Wrestling.

In January 2024, Reality of Wrestling partnered with Walker Texas Lawyer, a personal injury firm headquartered in Houston, Texas to launch the Walker Texas Lawyer Arena which would serve as the home of the promotion's television tapings, major events, and its school and training facilities. On August 9, 2024, the Walker Texas Lawyer Arena opened its doors in partnership with the Texas City-La Marque Chamber of Commerce.
