= Paul A Hampton =

American musician (born 1970)

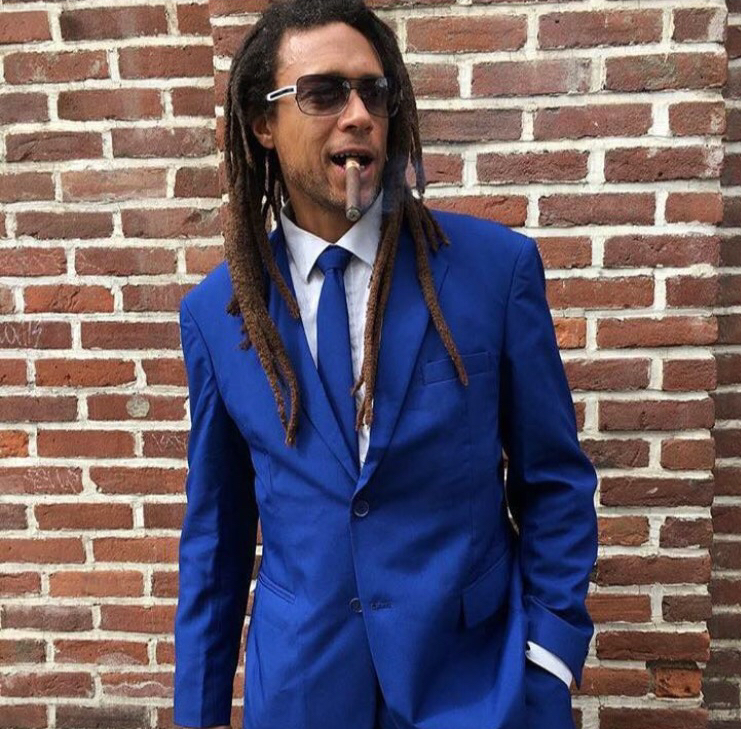
- Hampton in 2016

Background information
- Born: October 26, 1970 (age 55); Fontana, California
- Genres: Punk; Rock and roll
- Occupations: Singer; Songwriter; Producer; Keyboardist; Creator
- Spouse: Sandra Brown-Hampton
- Children: 2, including Calyx

Paul A Hampton (born October 26, 1970) is an American musician, songwriter, and producer, best known for his work as the keyboardist and creator of the ska band The Skeletones.

== Biography ==
Hampton released his first album as a high school senior while attending Perris High School in 1988 titled Introducing The Skeletones. Hampton toured with the band and soon begin recording other artists.

Hampton's recording experience includes collaborations and productions with recording artists such as Gwen Stefani, Angelo Moore, Phillip "Fish" Fisher, Norwood Fisher, Rocky George, John Steward, Jay Armant Jr., Walter Kibby, John Feldman, Charles Wright, Save Ferris, Voodoo Glow Skulls, The Insyders, Ron Moss, Guy Oseary, and Jay Rifkin.

== Music career ==
=== The Skeletones ===
Hampton is a founding member of the Southern California ska band The Skeletones. Formed in Orange County in the late 1980s, the group became part of the third-wave ska movement that emerged from the Southern California punk and ska scene. The band released several recordings through the 1990s and developed a following through touring and performances alongside other ska and alternative acts.

Hampton performed as a keyboardist and vocalist for the group and contributed to the band’s songwriting and recordings. The Skeletones remained active intermittently through the 2000s and 2010s, with Hampton continuing to be associated with the band’s performances and legacy in the regional ska scene.

=== Fishbone (2013–2018) ===
From 2013 to 2018, Hampton toured and performed as a keyboardist and vocalist with the American rock band Fishbone. During this period he performed with the group at a number of international festivals and venues.

Fishbone appeared at the Outside Lands Music and Arts Festival in San Francisco in 2013, where Hampton performed on keyboards and vocals. The band also performed at the Voodoo Experience in New Orleans in 2014 and at the Colombian festival Rock al Parque the same year.

During Hampton’s tenure with the band, Fishbone also appeared at major U.S. concert venues and festivals including Riot Fest in Chicago (2017) and the “Reggae on the Rocks” event at Red Rocks Amphitheatre in Colorado.

In November 2016 Hampton performed with Fishbone at the Apollo Theater in Harlem, New York, during the concert event “Hendrix in Harlem,” which celebrated the music of Jimi Hendrix.

While a member of Fishbone, Hampton participated in various live recordings and media appearances with the band, including sessions filmed for the music series Jam in the Van. Fishbone also collaborated with funk musician Charles Wright on a recording of the song “Express Yourself,” and Hampton contributed to the group’s activities surrounding the release of the EP Intrinsically Intertwined and the video for the song “Unstuck.”

Hampton departed Fishbone in 2018 following the return of longtime keyboardist Chris Dowd to the band’s touring lineup.

== Personal life ==
Hampton is married to Sandra Brown-Hampton. They have one son, and one daughter, Calyx Harmony Hampton who is a professional wrestler for the WWE known as Sol Ruca. Hampton invested in the mortgage and entertainment industry.
