= ROW Championship =

Men's professional wrestling world championship

Details
- Promotion: Reality of Wrestling
- Date established: July 21, 2007
- Current champion: Max Castellanos
- Date won: August 8, 2026

Other names
- PWA Heavyweight Championship (2007–2012); ROW Heavyweight Championship (2012–2024)
Statistics
- First champion: Neico
- Longest reign: Bulkster (386 days)

The ROW Championship is a world heavyweight championship in Reality of Wrestling (ROW). The current champion is Max Castellanos, who is in his first reign.

== Reigns ==
Key
No.	Overall reign number
Reign	Reign number for the specific champion
Days	Number of days held

No.	Champion	Championship change			Reign statistics		Notes	Ref.
No.	Champion	Date	Event	Location	Reign	Days	Notes	Ref.
1	Neico	July 21, 2007	PWA Clash of Champions	Pasadena, Texas	1	95		
2	Brett Idol	October 24, 2007	PWA Halloween Havoc	Pasadena, Texas	1	115		
3	Victor Imperial Porter	February 16, 2008	PWA Texas Tapout II	Pasadena, Texas	1	97		
4	Gustavo Mendoza	May 23, 2008	PWA Critical Condition	Pasadena, Texas	1	239		
5	Hero Tiger	N/A	N/A	Pasadena, Texas	1	N/A		
6	Gustavo Mendoza	N/A	N/A	Pasadena, Texas	2	N/A		
7	The Pride	N/A	PWA Ring of Pain	Pasadena, Texas	1	N/A		
8	Matt Chambers	N/A	N/A	Livingston, Texas	1	N/A		
9	Robbie Gilmore	March 13, 2010	PWA March Mayhem	Houston, Texas	1	N/A		
10	Bulkster	N/A	N/A	Houston, Texas	1	N/A		
11	Gustavo Mendoza	November 6, 2010	PWA Fall Frenzy	Houston, Texas	3	35		
12	Bulkster	December 11, 2010	PWA Christmas Chaos V	Houston, Texas	2	386		
—	Vacated	January 1, 2012	—	—	—	—	The title was vacated after Bulkster stopped defending it	
13	Robbie Gilmore	June 9, 2012	N/A	Houston, Texas	2	153		
14	Rob Barnes	November 9, 2012	N/A	Houston, Texas	1	121		
15	Japser Davis	March 10, 2013	N/A	Houston, Texas	1	153		
16	Gustavo Mendoza	August 10, 2013	ROW TV	Texas City, Texas	3	153		
17	The Pride	January 11, 2014	ROW TV	Texas City, Texas	1	N/A		
18	Samoan Beast	January 11, 2014	ROW TV	Texas City, Texas	1	N/A		
19	Mysterious Q	July 26, 2014	Summer of Champions	Humble, Texas	1	N/A	Defeate Samoan Beast in a steel cage match	
20	Fallah Bahh	March 14, 2014	ROW TV	Clear Lake, Texas	1	147		
21	Mysterious Q	August 8, 2015	Summer of Champions 2	Clear Lake, Texas	2	35	Defeated Fallah Bahh in a steel cage match	
22	Gino	September 12, 2015	ROW TV	Houston, Texas	1	147		
—	Vacated	August 28, 2016	—	—	—	—	The title was vacated after Gino stopped defending it	
23	Evan Snow	August 20, 2016	N/A	Houston, Texas	1	112		
24	Gino	December 10, 2016	Christmas Chaos XI	Texas City, Texas	2	119	Defeated Evan Snow in a ladder match	
25	Ayden Cristiano	April 8, 2017	Extrema	Texas City, Texas	1	245		
26	Gino	December 9, 2017	Christmas Chaos XII	Texas City, Texas	3	245	Defeated Ayden Cristiano in a Title vs. Career Lucha Extrema match	
27	Rex Andrews	August 11, 2018	Summer of Champions V	Texas City, Texas	1	210		
—	Vacated	March 9, 2019	—	—	—	—	The title was vacated after Rex Andrews stopped defending it	
28	Ryan Davidson	April 13, 2019	No Limits	Texas City, Texas	1	210	Won a battle royal for the vacant championship	
29	Bryan Keith	October 12, 2019	Rise to Wrestling Royalty	Texas City, Texas	1	N/A		
30	Ryan Davidson	N/A	N/A	Texas City, Texas	2	N/A		
31	Abel Andrew Jackson	October 11, 2020	Drive-In Swing Vote	Texas City, Texas	1	42		
32	Ryan Davidson	November 22, 2020	ROW TV	Texas City, Texas	3	20		
33	Cameron Cole	December 12, 2020	Christmas Chaos XV	Texas City, Texas	1	245	Defeated Ryan Davidson and Savage King in a three-way match	
34	Will Allday	August 14, 2021	Summer of Champions 2021	Texas City, Texas	1	169	Defeated Cameron Cole in a match where the ROW Texas Championship was also on the line	
35	Mysterious Q	January 30, 2022	ROW TV	Texas City, Texas	3	N/A		
36	Edge Stone	N/A	N/A	Texas City, Texas	1	N/A		
37	Matty Ice	July 14, 2023	ROW TV	Texas City, Texas	1	92		
38	Will Allday	October 14, 2023	ROW TV	Texas City, Texas	2	147		
39	Matty Ice	March 9, 2024	The Last Stand Rumble 2024	Texas City, Texas	2	63		
40	Gaspar Hernandez	May 11, 2024	No Limits 2024	Texas City, Texas	1	<1		
41	Edge Stone	May 11, 2024	No Limits 2024	Texas City, Texas	2	91		
42	Zilla Fatu	August 10, 2024	Summer of Champions X	Texas City, Texas	1	126		
43	Gaspar Hernandez	December 14, 2024	SubZero 2024	Texas City, Texas	2	119	Defeated Zilla Fatu and Edge Stone in a triple threat match	
44	Zilla Fatu	April 12, 2025	Pay Up! 2025	Texas City, Texas	2	119		
45	Danny Limelight	August 9, 2025	Summer of Champions 11	Texas City, Texas	1	245		
46	Niko Vance	April 11, 2026	The Last Stand Rumble 2026	Texas City, Texas	1	119		
47	Max Castellanos	August 8, 2026	Summer of Champions XII	Texas City, Texas	1	83+		
