= Kelani Jordan =

American professional wrestler (born 1998)

Personal information
- Born: Lea Mitchell; October 22, 1998 (age 28) Boynton Beach, Florida, U.S.
- Spouse: Carmelo Hayes (m. 2026)

Professional wrestling career
- Ring name(s): Kelani Jordan; Lea Mitchell
- Billed height: 5 ft 5 in (165 cm)
- Billed from: Boynton Beach, Florida
- Trained by: WWE Performance Center; Sara Del Rey
- Debut: October 28, 2022

Lea Brigham (née Mitchell; born October 22, 1998) is an American professional wrestler and former artistic gymnast. She is signed to WWE, where she performs on the NXT brand under the ring name Kelani Jordan and is the current NXT Women's Champion in her first reign. She is also a former one-time and inaugural NXT Women's North American Champion. She previously made appearances for WWE's partner promotion Total Nonstop Action Wrestling (TNA), where she is a former one-time TNA Knockouts World Champion.

== Professional wrestling career ==
=== WWE (2022−present) ===
In August 2022, Mitchell signed a contract with WWE and reported to the WWE Performance Center. Mitchell made her in-ring debut by participating in a battle royal at a NXT live event on October 28. On June 27, 2023, at NXT: Gold Rush, Mitchell, under the ring name Kelani Jordan, made her on-screen debut as the protégé of Dana Brooke. However, the storyline was dropped when Brooke was released on September 21. Jordan was announced as a participant in 2023 NXT Women's Breakout Tournament, defeating Izzi Dame in the first round and Arianna Grace in the semifinal, but lost to Lola Vice in the final at Night 2 of NXT: Halloween Havoc. On the November 28 episode of NXT, Jordan defeated Kiana James to advance for the Iron Survivor Challenge at NXT Deadline, but failed to win the match at the event.

In early 2024, Jordan and Fallon Henley formed a temporary partnership with Chase University's Thea Hail. At NXT Stand & Deliver on April 6, 2024, Jordan, Hail and Henley defeated Jacy Jayne, Kiana James and Izzi Dame in a six-woman tag team match. On the May 28 episode of NXT, Jordan defeated Wren Sinclair to qualify for a spot for the six-woman ladder match to crown the inaugural NXT Women's North American Champion at NXT Battleground on June 9, where she won the ladder match to become the inaugural NXT Women's North American Champion. On the June 18 episode of NXT, Jordan defeated Michin after interference from Jaida Parker in her first title defense. In September, Jordan feuded with Fatal Influence (Jacy Jayne, Fallon Henley, and Jazmyn Nyx), who had set their sights on the NXT Women's North American Championship. At NXT Halloween Havoc on October 27, Jordan defended the title against Fatal Influence in a gauntlet match, managing to defeat Nyx and Jayne but ultimately lost the title to Henley after interference from Nyx and Jayne, ending her reign at 140 days.

On January 7, 2025, at NXT: New Year's Evil, Jordan faced Cora Jade, Stephanie Vaquer, and Lola Vice in a fatal four-way match to determine the number one contender for the NXT Women's North American Championship which was won by Vaquer, who subsequently won the title. On the April 1 episode of NXT, Jordan defeated Roxanne Perez to qualify for the six-woman ladder match for the vacant NXT Women's North American Championship (vacated by Vaquer on the same night) at NXT Stand & Deliver. At the event, on April 19, Jordan failed to win the title.

On the October 28 episode of NXT, Jordan successfully defended the TNA Knockouts World Championship against Jordynne Grace after striking her with the championship belt while the referee was distracted at the brawl at ringside between Ricky Saints and Trick Williams, turning heel for the first time in her WWE career., the following week she would explain how the fans will praise so many others for cheating yet condemn her for doing the same, and says she will not be a fighting champion, only for Santino Marella, to tell her she will be defending her title at Gold Rush.

On January 31, 2026, at Royal Rumble, Jordan made her women's Royal Rumble match debut as the 27th entrant but she was eliminated by Jacy Jayne. At NXT Heatwave on August 30, Jordan defeated Kendal Grey for the NXT Women's Championship. With this victory, Jordan became the second person (after Jacy Jayne) to have held the NXT Women's Championship and the TNA Knockouts World Championship.. She also became the third woman to have held both the NXT Women's Championship and NXT Women's North American Championship, after Stephanie Vaquer and Tatum Paxley.

On November 10 episode of NXT, Jordan became the first female and first storyline heel to be invited to John Cena Classic by John Cena.

=== Total Nonstop Action Wrestling (2025) ===
On September 26, 2025, Jordan appeared at the Victory Road event of WWE's partner promotion Total Nonstop Action Wrestling (TNA), where Jordan and Léi Ying Lee won the 10-woman battle royal to determine who would face off for the vacant TNA Knockouts World Championship. Later in the night, Jordan defeated Lee to win the vacant TNA Knockouts World Championship, marking the first world championship in her career. At Bound for Glory, Jordan defeated Indi Hartwell to retain the title. At Turning Point, Jordan defeated M by Elegance to retain the title. At NXT Gold Rush, Jordan lost the title to Léi Yǐng Lee.

== Personal life ==
In 2023, Mitchell began dating fellow professional wrestler Christian Brigham, known professionally as Carmelo Hayes. The couple announced their engagement on July 5, 2025, and were married on October 17, 2026, in Miami.

Mitchell cites Bianca Belair, Bryan Danielson, and Rob Van Dam as her inspirations in wrestling.

== Championships and accomplishments ==
- Pro Wrestling Illustrated
  - Rookie of the Year (2024)
- Total Nonstop Action Wrestling
  - TNA Knockouts World Championship (1 time)
- WWE
  - NXT Women's Championship (1 time, current)
  - NXT Women's North American Championship (1 time, inaugural)
