= Mainland City Centre =

- Location: Texas City, Texas, United States
- Coordinates: 29°24′22″N 95°1′32″W
- Address: 10000 Emmett F. Lowry Expressway
- Opened: March 20, 1991
- Developer: Edward J. DeBartolo, Sr.
- Owner: Karam Investments
- Architect: MG Herring Group
- Num. of anchor tenants: 5 (4 open, 1 vacant)
- Floor area: 800,000 sq ft (74,000 m^{2})
- Floors: 1 (2 in former Macy's and former Dillard's)
- Website: mainlandcitycentre.com

Mainland City Centre, formerly known as Mall of the Mainland, is now a Premier Entertainment & Lifestyle Center located off the Emmett F. Lowry Expressway near Interstate 45 (Gulf Freeway) in Texas City, Texas. It was opened in 1991. The mall has 800,000 square feet (74,000 m^{2}) of space. The mall closed in late 2014 due to declining tenancy before its redevelopment began in 2015. Purchased by Jerome Karam, a Friendswood attorney and developer, specializing in restoring and repurposing large commercial properties. The building was brought up to modern architectural standards since joining the JMK5 Holdings portfolio. Over the course of five years, it has become home to Texas Entertainment Xperience (TEX), the largest entertainment center in Texas, the country’s largest World Gym, 33 fully furnished executive suites, Mainland City Suites, education facilities, and 9 award winning restaurants, making up Mainland City Centre’s Restaurant Row, with access to future festival grounds and outdoor entertainment facility.

== History ==
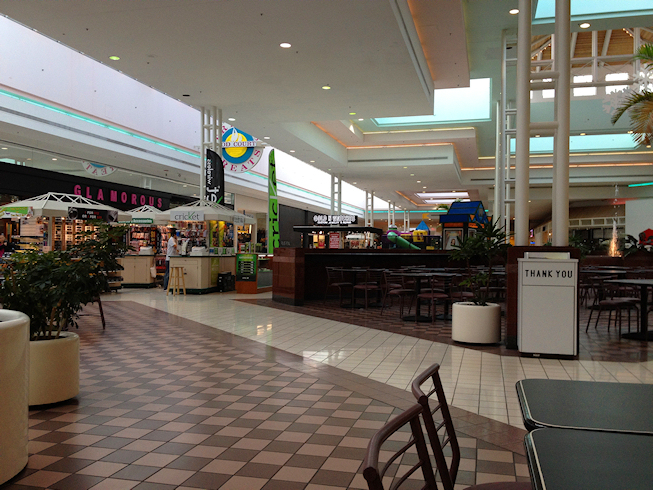
Mall of the Mainland food court

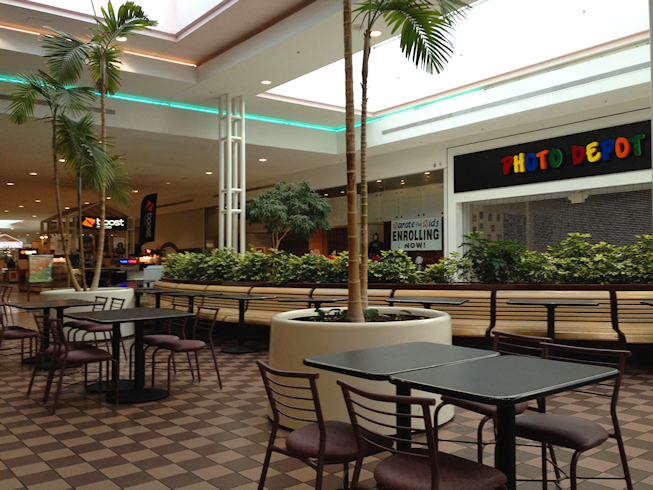
Mall of the Mainland food court

The Mall of the Mainland, developed by a joint venture of Edward J. DeBartolo Corp. and the MG Herring Group, opened in 1991. Dillard's and Sears purchased space at the mall in the 1980s. JCPenney was the third anchor, and the mall received an expansion with the addition of a Foley's store in 1994, which became a Macy's in 2006. The developers spent $200 per 1 square foot (0.093 m^{2}) in the development; Joelle Verbecke, a director of acquisitions at the Yari Group, said in 2002 that the $200 per square foot figure was "a hefty sum that means the developers constructed a high-quality mall." J.P. Morgan Chase Bank was the lender. The roof of the mall was damaged by an EF0 tornado on January 9, 2012.

== Failing on the rise ==
In 1997 the bank took over the mall, because, as Ralph Bivins of the Houston Chronicle said in 2002, "the developer failed to make it a highly successful retail venture." A subsidiary of the bank owned the mall. Verbecke said that the bank had no interest in making significant improvements and marketing the Mall of the Mainland and that the mall "suffered from being institutionally owned."

An investment group headed by Bob Yari and Kam Mateen bought the Mall of the Mainland in May 2002. The major anchor tenants, such as Dillard's, Foley's, and JCPenney, continued to own their own buildings within the complex, while the joint venture owned the rest of the mall and leased to restaurants and smaller stores. The group purchased 312,500 square feet (29,030 m^{2}) of retail space and 32 acres (13 ha) of land at the Mall of the Mainland, allowing the group to sell parcels to allow for the development of free-standing retailers and restaurants. Bivins said that the exact sales price had not been disclosed and that the sales price was less than the price it cost to build the mall.

== Declining period ==
As of May 2002, the Mall of the Mainland's occupancy was 65%. Bivins said in 2002 that the mall had "significant competition" with the Baybrook Mall in Friendswood, located 10 miles (16 km) north of the Mall of the Mainland, which Bivins said was "the dominant retail force on the southeast side of Houston." Bivins further asserted that experts from the shopping center industry did not consider the Mall of the Mainland to be successful. Bivins added that the Mall of the Mainland was "criticized for not being highly visible from" Interstate 45 (Gulf Freeway), which carries traffic between Galveston and Houston.

In November 2006, Triyar Cos. LLC, owned by the Yari family, put the mall and several other Greater Houston malls for sale; the company allowed a buyer to either buy an individual property or buy all of them at once. Mall of the Mainland was purchased in March 2007 by Brentwood Group No. 1 Ltd., owned by Michael and Mayer Makabeh.

In August 2005, JCPenney announced to close the Mall of the Mainland location.

Dillard's closed in September 2008 after 4 million dollars in uninsured damages due to Hurricane Ike. The store did not reopen.

In 2010, Brentwood Group filed for Chapter 11 Bankruptcy Protection, and the mall became owned by Pacific Western Bank. Pacific Western Bank would hire Boxer Retail to manage the property.

In September 2012, Pacific Western Bank put Mall of the Mainland up for sale for $15.4 million

== Final shutdown ==
In December 2013, KHOU 11 News announced that Mall of the Mainland would be evicting all of its interior tenants and closing its doors on January 31, 2014. Sears, Palais Royal, and the Cinemark Movies 12 Theater would remain open and on the property at the time. Sears and Palais Royal would eventually close within the following years and Cinemark 12 is currently receiving a renovation under a new company.

== Return ==
On August 18, 2015, developer Jerome Karam, an attorney known for buying an under-utilized building and developing, bought a 150,000-square-foot building once occupied by Macy's. Palais Royal moved from its existing store into the space. Karam moved a World Gym into the Macy's space. He calls the 42,000-square-foot gym Texas' largest in the franchise. The developer also sold the Dillard's building to First Baptist Church of Texas City. Karam told the Houston Chronicle in an interview that he is offering "1980s-level" rents for lease space, keeping the mall competitive. While the mall is not yet completely leased, it continues to make a comeback and, in addition to the above tenants, now houses an Altitude Trampoline Park, Stuttgarden Tavern, and other small shops. Multiple store spaces in the mall were used as recovery sites in the aftermath of Hurricane Harvey. The mall was renamed Shops on the Mainland in 2015.

Booker T moved his wrestling school Reality of Wrestling into the space next to Palais Royal. In September 2018 the old Dillards building became occupied by First Baptist Church of Texas city . In March 2019 a new storage facility occupied the old JCPenney building.

On August 6, 2019, it was announced that Sears would be closing this location as part of a plan to close 26 stores nationwide. The store closed in October 2019.

In May 2020, it was announced that Palais Royal would be closing due to the parent company filing for bankruptcy and liquidating all locations, unless a buyer for the chain can be found.

In 2020, the mall was renamed Mainland City Centre.

In 2020 Odyssey Academy Charter School Pk3-6th grades moved into the Mainland City Centre on the back end near Sears side of old mall next to movie theater.

On December 30, 2021, Cinemark Movies 12 closed after nearly over 30 years in operation. Cinemark decided not to renew their lease at the center. The closure will allow Karam the opportunity to convert the existing theater into one with a dine-in movie concept.
