= Reality of Wrestling =

Independent professional wrestling promotion based in Houston, Texas, U.S.

- Formerly: Pro Wrestling Alliance (2006–2011)
- Type: Private
- Industry: Professional wrestling
- Genre: Sports entertainment
- Founded: 2005; 21 years ago
- Founder: Booker T. Huffman Jr. Sharmell
- Headquarters: Walker Texas Lawyer Arena, 9300 E.F. Lowry Expressway, Suite 50, Texas City, Texas, United States
- Area served: Worldwide
- Website: realityofwrestling.com

Reality of Wrestling (ROW) is an independent professional wrestling promotion and school based in Houston, Texas. It was established as Pro Wrestling Alliance (PWA) in 2005 by WWE Hall of Famer Booker T. Since 2024, it has been used as a developmental territory by WWE under the WWE ID program.

== History ==
=== Pro Wrestling Alliance ===
The Pro Wrestling Alliance's first show was held in December 2006. Owner Booker T started the promotion to give professional wrestlers the opportunity to properly train, as well as to keep the legacy of Paul Boesch's Houston Wrestling alive. The money made at shows is donated to Fights For Kids Foundation, which helps kids stay off the streets and shows them the benefits of a better life.

Monthly events were held at the Pasadena Convention Center in Pasadena, Texas, and later at the Clear Lake Recreation Sports Center in Clear Lake, Texas.

In December 2007, Rob Van Dam wrestled his first match after leaving WWE against Booker T for the PWA, and the match is included on the DVD The Best of RVD TV Vol 1 DVD in the extras.

=== Reality of Wrestling ===
On March 9, 2012, after seven years as the Pro Wrestling Alliance, the promotion was re-launched as Reality of Wrestling (ROW) and began holding events at the Booker T World Gym Arena in Texas City, Texas. The name change was a spontaneous decision of Booker T. In December 2012, the promotion almost closed with Christmas Chaos planned as the last show. However, last minute investors and partners helped the promotion continue to run.

The promotion produces a weekly YouTube show with tapings taking place once monthly at their live events in Clear Lake. ROW later launched a local television program in Houston, Texas that originally aired on KUBE-TV Channel 57 and currently airs on Sunday mornings on KIAH-TV Channel 39. In February 2014, ROW partnered with the Soul of the South Network to air the show in 20 cities. They aired their first internet pay-per-view in July 2014. Episodes were also aired on FITE TV.

The promotion also includes a school that has a two-year training program for beginning professional wrestlers, as opposed to the more traditional three and six month programs at other schools.

On July 6, 2019, ROW and Impact Wrestling co-produced an event together called Deep Impact that aired live on YouTube and Twitch.

On October 20, 2021, it was announced that ROW would hold its first event outside of Texas called One Night in Vegas in Las Vegas, Nevada on November 19, 2021 at MGM Grand Las Vegas.

On January 25, 2024, ROW, and the United Wrestling Network (UWN)'s Memphis Wrestling & Championship Wrestling promotions, announced a talent exchange program.

On October 29, 2024, ROW become an independent wrestling school for the WWE's developmental program designed for the independent wrestlers called WWE ID, short for WWE Independent Development.

On March 6, 2025, ROW announced that it will be launching two new shows: ROW Platinum (flagship show) and ROW Glory.

== Championships and accomplishments ==
=== Current champions ===
Most wrestlers perform exclusively on a single brand (with select exemptions). ROW's two primary brands are Platinum and Glory, with Platinum serving as the primary brand. As of November 16 2026, among the two current brands, 9 wrestlers officially hold championships. This list includes the number of times the wrestler has held the title, the date and location of the win, and a description of the match victory.

– Platinum
– Glory
– Unbranded

==== Platinum and Glory ====
Platinum and Glory each exclusively have a world championship for both the men and women.

Note: Tables with a "Days rec." column means that ROW officially recognizes a different number of days that a wrestler has held a title, generally due to an event airing on tape delay.

Championship	Current champion(s)	Reign	Date won	Days held	Days rec.	Location	Notes	Ref.
ROW Championship	Max Castellanos	1	August 8, 2026	100	100	Texas City, Texas	Defeated previous champion Niko Vance, Danny Limelight, and Hoka in a fatal four-way match at Summer of Champions XII.	
ROW Texas Championship	Cap Jones	1	August 8, 2026	100	100	Texas City, Texas	Defeated previous champion Jay Alexander, Terrale Tempo, and Chandler Hopkins at Summer of Champions XII	
ROW Women's Championship	Jazmin Allure	1	October 24, 2026	23	23	Texas City, Texas	Defeated Rachel Ley at Glory 14 – Sherri Martel Classic in the final of the Sherri Martel Classic to win the vacant title. Previous champion Monica Monroe vacated the title due to winning the WWE Women's ID Championship and subsequently a WWE ID contract.	
ROW Glory Championship	Big Luther	1	August 8, 2026	100	100	Texas City, Texas	Defeated A. J. Francis at Summer of Champions XII.	
ROW Glory Women's Championship	Mia Friday	1	August 8, 2026	100	100	Texas City, Texas	Defeated Mystii Marks at Summer of Champions XII to win the vacant title. Previous champion Gigi Rey vacated the title due to injury.	
ROW Legacy Championship	Terrale Tempo	1	November 14, 2026	2	2	Texas City, Texas	Defeated Jesse Funaki at Platinum – Fall Fury.	

=== Unbranded ===
These titles are non-exclusive, available to wrestlers from Platinum and Glory.

Championship	Current champion(s)	Reign	Date won	Days held	Days rec.	Location	Notes	Ref.
ROW Tag Team Championship	Hank and Tank (Hank Walker and Tank Ledger)	2	August 8, 2026	100	100	Texas City, Texas	Defeated Motion (EJ Nduka and Sam Holloway) at Summer of Champions XII.	

== Defunct championships ==
Championship	Final champion(s)	Reign	Date won	Date retired	Location	Notes	Ref.
ROW Television Championship	A. J. Francis	1	March 30, 2025	May 31, 2025	Texas City, Texas	Francis retired the title and replaced it with the inaugural ROW Glory Championship at Glory.	
ROW Women's Tag Team Championship	The Money Birds (Gigi Rey and Monica Monroe)	1	November 10, 2024	August 8, 2026	Texas City, Texas	Previous champions The Money Birds (Gigi Rey and Monica Monroe) originally vacated the title due to Gigi Rey suffering an injury; the title was later deactivated after the injury.	

== See also ==
- List of professional wrestling television series
