= NXT Women's North American Championship =

WWE professional wrestling championship

- The NXT Women's North American Championship belt with default side plates

Details
- Promotion: WWE
- Brand: NXT
- Date established: April 6, 2024
- Current champion: Zaria
- Date won: June 9, 2026
Statistics
- First champion: Kelani Jordan
- Longest reign: Sol Ruca (189 days)
- Shortest reign: Thea Hail (21 days)
- Oldest champion: Stephanie Vaquer (31 years, 323 days)
- Youngest champion: Thea Hail (22 years, 98 days)

The NXT Women's North American Championship is a women's professional wrestling championship created and promoted by the American promotion WWE. It is the secondary women's championship of the company's development brand, NXT. The current champion is Zaria, who is in her first reign. She won the title by defeating Tatum Paxley on the June 9, 2026, episode of NXT.

Established on April 6, 2024, it was the first secondary women's championship in company history and the inaugural champion was Kelani Jordan. In August 2026, the WWE Women's Speed Championship was unified into the NXT Women's North American Championship.

== History ==
At Stand & Deliver on April 6, 2024, the WrestleMania week event for WWE's developmental brand NXT, the NXT Women's North American Championship was announced by NXT General Manager Ava, subsequently marking the first secondary championship for women in company history. During Week 2 of the Spring Breakin' special of NXT on April 30, Ava announced that the inaugural champion would be crowned from a six-woman ladder match at Battleground on June 9, 2024. To determine the participants, there was a combine, and the top 12 names that impressed competed in qualifying matches. The six winners of each qualifier then advanced to the ladder match. On the May 7 episode of NXT, Ava announced that Sol Ruca, Thea Hail, Jaida Parker, Brinley Reece, Michin (from SmackDown), Fallon Henley, Lash Legend, Ivy Nile (from Raw), Izzi Dame, Kelani Jordan, Tatum Paxley, and Wren Sinclair advanced to the qualifiers. Jordan, Ruca, Legend, Henley, Parker, and Michin advanced to the ladder match, which Jordan won to become the inaugural champion.

On the December 16, 2025, episode of NXT, reigning champion Blake Monroe defended the NXT Women's North American Championship against Thea Hail. A legitimate unplanned finish occurred, as Monroe was supposed to retain the title. During a pinfall by Hail, Monroe was supposed to kick out but did not get her shoulder up in time and the referee counted the pin, naming Hail the winner, causing confusion to both Hail and Monroe, as well as WWE's production team. It was reported that this affected WWE's creative for several wrestlers that was planned for the next couple of weeks, as WWE had already done tapings for the holidays, with adjustments being made immediately.

At Heatwave on August 30, 2026, the WWE Women's Speed Championship was unified into the NXT Women's North American Championship. At the event, which forwent the Speed title's five-minute time limit rule, reigning Women's North American Champion Zaria defeated Women's Speed Champion Wren Sinclair and Kali Armstrong in a Winner Takes All triple threat match to unify the titles, with the Women's Speed Championship immediately retired. Although Sinclair was recognized as the final Women's Speed Champion, on the following episode of NXT, general manager Robert Stone allowed Zaria to choose which title she wanted to keep and she chose the North American.

== Belt design ==
The championship belt is nearly identical to its male counterpart albeit on a smaller white strap and has a red background as opposed to black, also featuring a small banner that says "Women's" right above the "North American" banner on its main plate. Like all of WWE's other championship belts, the two side plates feature a removable center section which can be customized with the champion's logos; the default side plates feature a horizontal NXT logo.

== Reigns ==
As of November 18, 2026, there have been nine reigns among nine champions and one vacancy. Kelani Jordan was the inaugural champion. Sol Ruca has the longest reign at 189 days, while Thea Hail has the shortest at 21 days. Stephanie Vaquer is the oldest title holder at 31, while Hail is the youngest at 22.

Zaria is the current champion in her first reign. She defeated Tatum Paxley on the June 9, 2026, episode of NXT in Orlando, Florida.

Key
No.	Overall reign number
Reign	Reign number for the specific champion
Days	Number of days held
Days recog.	Number of days held recognized by the promotion
+	Current reign is changing daily

No.	Champion	Championship change			Reign statistics			Notes	Ref.
No.	Champion	Date	Event	Location	Reign	Days	Days recog.	Notes	Ref.
WWE: NXT
1	Kelani Jordan	June 9, 2024	Battleground	Enterprise, NV	1	140	140	Defeated Fallon Henley, Jaida Parker, Lash Legend, Michin, and Sol Ruca in a six-woman ladder match to become the inaugural champion.	
2	Fallon Henley	October 27, 2024	Halloween Havoc	Hershey, PA	1	111	110	This was a Spin the Wheel, Make the Deal: Spinner's Choice Gauntlet match that also featured Henley's Fatal Influence stablemates Jacy Jayne and Jazmyn Nyx.	
3	Stephanie Vaquer	February 15, 2025	Vengeance Day	Washington, D.C.	1	45	45		
—	Vacated	April 1, 2025	NXT	Orlando, FL	—	—	—	NXT General Manager Ava ordered Stephanie Vaquer to relinquish the title as she was also the reigning NXT Women's Champion.	
4	Sol Ruca	April 19, 2025	Stand & Deliver	Paradise, NV	1	189	189	Defeated Izzi Dame, Kelani Jordan, Lola Vice, Thea Hail, and Zaria in a six-woman ladder match to win the vacant championship.	
5	Blake Monroe	October 25, 2025	Halloween Havoc	Prescott Valley, AZ	1	52	52	Defeated Zaria, who defended the title on behalf of an injured Sol Ruca.	
6	Thea Hail	December 16, 2025	NXT	Orlando, FL	1	21	21	This was a legitimate unplanned finish, as in reality, Monroe was supposed to retain the title, but during a pin, Monroe did not get her shoulder up in time and the referee counted the pinfall.	
7	Izzi Dame	January 6, 2026	NXT: New Year's Evil	Orlando, FL	1	60	59		
8	Tatum Paxley	March 7, 2026	Vengeance Day	Orlando, FL	1	94	94		
9	Zaria	June 9, 2026	NXT	Orlando, FL	1	162+	162+	On August 30, 2026, at Heatwave, Zaria defeated Wren Sinclair to unify the WWE Women's Speed Championship into the NXT Women's North American Championship in a Winner Takes All triple threat match, also involving Kali Armstrong.	

== Combined reigns ==
As of November 18, 2026.

†	Indicates the current champion

Rank	Wrestler	No. of reigns	Combined days	Combined days rec. by WWE
1	Sol Ruca	1	189	
2	Zaria †	1	162+	
3	Kelani Jordan	1	140	
4	Fallon Henley	1	111	110
5	Tatum Paxley	1	94	
6	Izzi Dame	1	60	
7	Blake Monroe	1	52	
8	Stephanie Vaquer	1	45	
9	Thea Hail	1	21	

== See also ==
- Women's championships in WWE
