= Ava (wrestler) =

American professional wrestler

Personal information
- Born: Simone Alexandra Garcia Johnson; August 14, 2001 (age 25) Davie, Florida, U.S
- Parents: Dwayne Johnson; Dany Garcia
- Family: Anoaʻi

Professional wrestling career
- Ring name(s): Ava; Ava Raine
- Billed height: 5 ft 10 in (178 cm)
- Billed weight: 143 lb (65 kg)
- Trained by: WWE Performance Center; Dwayne "The Rock" Johnson
- Debut: October 25, 2022

Simone Alexandra Garcia Johnson (born August 14, 2001) is an American professional wrestler. She is best known for her time in WWE, where she performed under the ring names Ava and Ava Raine, and appeared as the on-screen general manager of the NXT brand. She was also the inaugural general manager of the Evolve brand.

Johnson is a fourth-generation wrestler, being the daughter of Dwayne "The Rock" Johnson, connecting her to the Anoaʻi family of Samoan origin.

== Early life and education ==
Johnson was born in Davie, Florida, on August 14, 2001. She is the first daughter of professional wrestler and entertainer Dwayne "The Rock" Johnson (through whom she has two younger sisters from his second marriage) and Dany Garcia, a Cuban-American businesswoman, IFBB professional bodybuilder and producer. Johnson's parents announced their separation on June 1, 2007 and divorced in May 2008. From her father's side, Johnson is the granddaughter of Ata (née Maivia) and Rocky Johnson, a Samoan and Black Nova Scotian respectively. She is a relative of the Anoaʻi wrestling family.

In January 2018, Johnson was a Golden Globe Ambassador for the 75th Golden Globe Awards. She attended the private high school NSU University School, where she graduated and earned her diploma in May 2019. After graduating, Johnson had initially planned to take up her college studies at New York University in August 2019, but when she suffered a knee injury a month prior in July, she decided to stay in Orlando, Florida, to pursue her professional wrestling career. She has cited her grandmother as the person who got her into wrestling.

== Career ==
=== WWE (2020–2026) ===
==== Training and Schism (2020–2023) ====
In November 2017, Johnson expressed her interest in becoming a professional wrestler.

In February 2020, WWE announced that Johnson had reported to the WWE Performance Center and had begun her training, making her the first fourth-generation wrestler to sign a contract with the company.

On the October 25, 2022, episode of NXT, Johnson made her first televised appearance, revealing herself to be a member of Joe Gacy's villainous faction, Schism. She debuted under the ring name Ava Raine, (later shortened to Ava) on February 14, 2023. Ava made her in-ring debut on April 1 at NXT Stand & Deliver with Schism, losing to Chase University. Schism would slowly begin to disband in September 2023, starting with the expiration of The Dyad's contracts on September 14, and culminating in a backstage segment in October where Gacy declared that Schism was dead.

==== NXT general manager (2023–2026) ====
After Schism, Ava became the on-screen assistant of Senior Vice President of Talent Development Creative Shawn Michaels. On January 23, 2024, she was promoted to become the new General Manager of NXT, becoming the youngest general manager in WWE. Ava made her main roster debut appearance three days later on SmackDown where she assisted SmackDown General Manager Nick Aldis with the Royal Rumble entry draw. At NXT Stand & Deliver on April 6, she announced the creation of the NXT Women's North American Championship as the equivalent to its male counterpart, making the title the first women's secondary championship in WWE. On the March 5, 2025 episode of Evolve, Michaels announced that Ava will be in charge to direct the newly revived Evolve brand. Three weeks later, Ava announced that Stevie Turner, her co-Assistant General Manager of NXT, will take on an additional role as the new General Manager of Evolve.

On January 30, 2026, Ava announced that she elected not to renew her WWE contract, ending her six-year tenure with the promotion.

== Personal life ==
As of 2025, Johnson is in a relationship with former NXT performer Tatyanna Dumas.
