= Sol Ruca =

American professional wrestler (born 1999)

- Ruca in 2026

Personal information
- Born: Calyx Harmony Hampton; August 26, 1999 (age 27) Ontario, California, U.S.
- Education: University of Oregon
- Parent: Paul A Hampton (father)

Professional wrestling career
- Ring name: Sol Ruca
- Billed height: 5 ft 9 in (1.75 m)
- Billed weight: 139 lb (63 kg)
- Billed from: Honolulu, Hawaii
- Trained by: WWE Performance Center
- Debut: June 24, 2022

Calyx Harmony Hampton (born August 26, 1999) is an American professional wrestler. As of March 2022, she is signed to WWE, where she performs on the Raw brand under the ring name Sol Ruca. She is a former one-time WWE Women's Intercontinental Champion, one-time NXT Women's North American Champion, and one-time WWE Women's Speed Champion.

== Early life ==
Calyx Harmony Hampton was born on August 26, 1999 in Ontario, California. Her father is African-American musician, Paul A Hampton, and her mother is white American Sandy Brown-Hampton. She has a brother named Coda. In 2017, Hampton graduated from Western Christian High School, in Upland, California.

== College athletics ==
Hampton attended the University of Oregon from 2017 to 2021, where she was a base and tumbler on the Oregon Ducks acrobatics and tumbling team while majoring in human physiology.

During her 2018 freshman season, Hampton was part of a team that went 5-4 and reached the National Collegiate Acrobatics and Tumbling Association national semifinals. On March 28, 2018, she was named NCATA Freshman of the Week. At the 2018 NCATA Individual Event Finals, she was part of the 10-person squad that won the individual event national title in the synchronized pyramid heat, and she contributed to two perfect 10 scores in open toss heats during the season.

In 2019, Hampton competed in all 10 meets across all six events and 10 heats, helping Oregon to a 7–3 record and an NCATA National Championship runner-up finish. At the NCATA Individual Event Finals, she won an individual event national title in the open pyramid heat with a score of 9.925. During the regular season, she also contributed to three perfect 10 scores: one in the compulsory toss against Quinnipiac on February 17, and two against Arizona Christian on February 23 in the compulsory pyramid and compulsory toss.

== Professional wrestling career ==
=== WWE (2022–present) ===
==== Early beginnings (2022–2024) ====
Hampton was part of a group of new recruits signed to the WWE Performance Center in March 2022. She had no previous wrestling experience, instead coming from an acrobatics and tumbling background. She began to work under the ring name Sol Ruca, gaining viral fame for her innovative finisher, a springboard frontflip cutter dubbed the Sol Snatcher. She made her in-ring debut on June 24, 2022 at a live event, and her on-screen debut on the July 15 episode of NXT Level Up, losing to Kiana James. In April 2023, Ruca was written off television as she required surgery for her ruptured ACL. Prior to being written off, Ruca appeared on Night 1 of WrestleMania 39 in a cinnamoji costume during Rey Mysterio's entrance. Ruca returned from injury at NXT: Roadblock on March 5, 2024, attacking Blair Davenport, who had injured Ruca in kayfabe. Ruca defeated Davenport twice, first at NXT and later, at Spring Breakin' in a Beach Brawl. On the June 25 episode of NXT, Ruca defeated Arianna Grace to earn a NXT Women's North American Championship match against Kelani Jordan at NXT Heatwave on July 7, but failed to win the title from Jordan.

==== NXT (2024–2026) ====
At NXT Deadline on December 7, Ruca competed in the Women’s Iron Survivor Challenge to determine the number one contender for the NXT Women's Championship, where she would lose. She went on to form a tag team with fellow Iron Survivor Challenge competitor Zaria (later colloquially known as ZaRuca). According to Zaria, the pairing was originally meant to be a one-off. The pair teamed up on the March 4, 2025 episode of NXT to defeat Women's United States Champion Chelsea Green and Piper Niven with Ruca pinning Green. As a result, Ruca received a Women's United States Championship match two weeks later, but she failed to defeat Green for the title. Ruca became a double champion in NXT when she defeated Candice LeRae for the WWE Women's Speed Championship on April 11 (aired April 16 on tape delay) and won a six-woman ladder match at NXT Stand & Deliver for the vacant NXT Women's North American Championship.

As part of NXT, Ruca also appeared on WWE's partner promotion TNA Wrestling. She wrestled for the TNA Knockouts World Champion against Jordynne Grace, which ended in a no-contest. She also worked on Impact!,

Ruca also worked on the main roster, participating at the Evolution PPV, where ZaRuca failed to win the WWE Women’s Tag Team Championship. On the October 17 episode of SmackDown, ZaRuca unsuccessfully challenged for the WWE Women's Tag Team Championship with Ruca injuring her left knee in the process. She subsequently lost the NXT Women's North American Championship at NXT Halloween Havoc after Zaria, who defended the title, lost to Blake Monroe, and vacated the Women's Speed Championship, ending her record-setting reign for both titles at 189 days and 195 days, respectively. At Night 1 of NXT: Gold Rush on November 18, Ruca failed to regain the NXT Women's North American Championship from Monroe after Zaria threw in the towel. In December, Ruca was selected by John Cena as one of the participants of the Women’s Iron Survivor Challenge at NXT Deadline and to wrestle in Cena’s final event at Saturday Night's Main Event XLII against Bayley. For defeating Bayley, Ruca was awarded with a Women's United States Championship match against Chelsea Green but she failed to win the title after interference from Alba Fyre and Ethan Page.

Ruca also appeared at Royal Rumble, making her women's Royal Rumble match debut, where she lasted as the final three competitor before being eliminated by Tiffany Stratton and wrestled for the TNA Knockouts World Tag Team Championship, against The Elegance Brand (Heather by Elegance and M by Elegance). On the February 24 episode of NXT, Zaria turned on Ruca during the latter's NXT Women's Championship match against Jacy Jayne. On the following week, Ruca retaliated by taking out both Zaria and Jayne during their championship match. The pair faced each other at NXT Stand & Deliver on April 4 with Ruca coming out victorious after delivering three Sol Snatchers on Zaria. They ended their feud at NXT: Revenge, where Ruca lost to Zaria in a Last Woman Standing match marking Ruca's final match in NXT.

==== Raw (2026–present) ====
On the April 20 episode of Raw, Ruca made her debut appearance on Raw and faced Women's World Champion Liv Morgan in a non-title match, which she lost after interference from Zaria. At Clash in Italy on May 31, Ruca defeated Becky Lynch to win the WWE Women's Intercontinental Championship. She held the title for 57 days before losing it to Raquel Rodriguez on the July 27 episode of Raw after interference from Liv Morgan and Roxanne Perez. On the September 7 episode of Raw, Ruca defeated Lyra Valkyria and Maxxine Dupri to qualify for the Women's Money in the Bank ladder match. At the event on October 10, Ruca failed to win the match as it was won by Tiffany Stratton.

== Championships and accomplishments ==
- Fightful
  - Finisher of the Year (2025) – Sol Snatcher
- Pro Wrestling Illustrated
  - Rookie of the Year (2023)
  - Ranked No. 23 of the top 250 female singles wrestlers in the PWI Women's 250 in 2025
- WWE
  - WWE Women's Intercontinental Championship (1 time)
  - WWE Women's Speed Championship (1 time)
  - NXT Women's North American Championship (1 time)
  - WWE Women's Speed Championship #1 Contender Tournament (March 26–April 16, 2025)
  - NXT Year-End Award (2 times)
    - Tag Team of the Year (2025) – ZaRuca (with Zaria)
    - Female Superstar of the Year (2025)
