= Hank Walker =

American professional wrestler and former football player (born 1998)

- Born: Joseph Sculthorpe; June 11, 1998 (age 28); Hampstead, North Carolina, U.S.
- Education: North Carolina State University
- Professional wrestling career
- Ring name: Hank Walker
- Billed height: 6 ft 3 in (191 cm)
- Billed weight: 290 lb (132 kg)
- Billed from: Hampstead, North Carolina
- Trained by: WWE Performance Center
- Debut: June 11, 2022
- Football career

Profile
- Position: Offensive guard

Personal information
- Listed height: 6 ft 3 in (1.91 m)
- Listed weight: 307 lb (139 kg)

Career information
- High school: Topsail (Hampstead, North Carolina)
- College: NC State (2016–2020)
- NFL draft: 2021: undrafted

Career history
- Atlanta Falcons (2021)*
- * Offseason or practice squad member only
- Stats at Pro Football Reference

Joseph Sculthorpe (born June 11, 1998) is an American professional wrestler and former football player. He is signed to WWE, where he performs on the NXT brand under the ring name Hank Walker. He is one-half of Hank and Tank with Tank Ledger, where they are former NXT Tag Team Champions.

== Early life ==
Sculthorpe attended Topsail High School in Hampstead, North Carolina. He played football and wrestled while at Topsail. In football, he had scholarship offers from NC State and East Carolina, ultimately choosing to attend NC State. In wrestling, he won the 2014 NCHSAA 3A 285-pound state championship as a sophomore, after finishing as a state runner-up his freshman year.

== College football career ==
Sculthorpe played college football for the NC State Wolfpack from 2016 until 2020. While at NC State, he won the 2016 Independence Bowl and then the 2017 Sun Bowl the following year. Sculthorpe would make it to the Gator Bowl in 2018 and 2021, but failed to win both. He graduated in May 2020 with a degree in Sociology.

After going undrafted in the 2021 NFL draft, Sculthorpe signed with the Atlanta Falcons as an offensive guard on May 14, 2021. He was waived on August 31, signed to the practice squad on September 1, released on September 3, signed to the practice squad again on November 18, and released again on November 19, 2021.

== Professional wrestling career ==
On March 17, 2022, Sculthorpe signed a developmental contract with WWE and was assigned to the WWE Performance Center. Sculthorpe, going under the ring name Hank Walker, made his in-ring debut at an NXT live event on June 11, 2022, losing to Von Wagner. Walker made his on-screen debut on the July 1 episode of NXT Level Up, losing to Channing "Stacks" Lorenzo. Walker served as Drew Gulak's protégé until February 14, 2023 episode of NXT, where Gulak turned on Walker and aligned with Charlie Dempsey.

In March 2023, Walker began teaming with Tank Ledger as Hank and Tank. On December 14, 2024, at an event of Reality of Wrestling (ROW), Hank and Tank won the ROW Tag Team Championship. They lost the titles on March 8, 2025, holding the title for 84 days. On April 15 episode of NXT, Hank and Tank won the tag team gauntlet match to become the number one contenders for the NXT Tag Team Championship at NXT Stand & Deliver. At the event, Hank and Tank defeated Fraxiom (Nathan Frazer and Axiom) to win the NXT Tag Team Championship.

== Other media ==
=== Video games ===
Year	Title	Notes
2026	WWE 2K26	Video game debut

=== Filmography ===
Year	Title	Role	Notes
2026	Agent of Shadows	Hank Abruzzo	Microdrama series; acting debut

== Championships and accomplishments ==
=== Football ===
- Independence Bowl (2016)
- Sun Bowl (2017)

=== Professional wrestling ===
- Pro Wrestling Noah
  - GHC Tag Team Championship (1 time) – with Tank Ledger
- Reality of Wrestling
  - ROW Tag Team Championship (2 times, current) – with Tank Ledger
- WWE
  - NXT Tag Team Championship (1 time) – with Tank Ledger
