= Jazmyn Nyx =

American professional wrestler (born 1998)

Personal information
- Born: Jade Arianna Gentile; July 28, 1998 (age 28) Baldwinsville, New York, U.S.

Professional wrestling career
- Ring name(s): Jade Gentile; Jazmyn Nyx
- Billed height: 5 ft 4 in (163 cm)
- Billed weight: 110 lb (50 kg)
- Billed from: Syracuse, New York
- Trained by: WWE Performance Center; Sara Del Rey
- Debut: August 18, 2023
Association football career
- Position: Forward
Youth career
- Charles W. Baker Bees
College career
Years	Team	Apps	(Gls)
2016–2019	West Virginia Mountaineers	80	(3)
Senior career*
Years	Team	Apps	(Gls)
2022	UMF Afturelding	9	(1)
- * Club domestic league appearances and goals as of June 19, 2022

Jade Arianna Gentile (born July 28, 1998) is an American professional wrestler and former soccer player. She is best known for her tenure in WWE, where she performed under the ring name Jazmyn Nyx.

== Early life ==
Jade Arianna Gentile was born on July 28, 1998 in Baldwinsville, New York. Gentile attended Charles W. Baker High School, where she played soccer and scored 60 goals and 19 assists in her varsity career. Gentile attended West Virginia University (WVU) majoring in global supply chain management. She also played soccer as part of the WVU sports program and went on to play as a forward for Icelandic club UMF Afturelding.

== Professional wrestling career ==
=== WWE (2022–2025) ===
On November 10, 2022, Gentile was announced as having signed with WWE as part of the WWE Performance Center Fall 2022 Rookie Class.

In January 2024, now under the ring name Jazmyn Nyx, she began appearing as a student at Chase University and befriended fellow student Jacy Jayne. On the February 20 episode of NXT, Nyx and Thea Hail accompanied Jayne at ringside where Nyx used underhanded tactics to help Jayne win the match to Hail's disdain, thus establishing herself as a heel. Eventually, Nyx and Jayne turned on Chase U and left the group. On the March 26 episode of NXT, Nyx made her televised in-ring debut against Hail where she was defeated. On the June 4 episode of NXT, Nyx defeated Hail to earn her first televised singles win. On the July 9 episode of NXT, Nyx and Jayne formed an alliance with Fallon Henley, eventually calling themselves Fatal Influence. The trio teamed up for the first time at Week 1 of NXT: The Great American Bash on July 30, where they defeated Karmen Petrovic, Lola Vice, and Sol Ruca in a six-woman tag team match.

In April 2025, it was reported that Nyx was sidelined for undisclosed reasons. However, she would return on the May 27 episode of NXT to assist Jayne in winning the NXT Women's Championship. On the September 23 episode of NXT, Nyx was found attacked backstage. This led to her expulsion from Fatal Influence after she was abandoned by Jayne and Henley. A day later, Nyx announced her departure from WWE after her contract expired and she decided not to renew it due to injuries suffered during her time there and being unhappy with the new contract offered.

== Professional wrestling style ==
Nyx used an overhead kick called the Pelé Kick (later called the Nyx Kick) as her finishing move in reference to her soccer background.

== Other media ==
=== Video games ===
Year	Title	Notes	Ref.
2026	WWE 2K26	Video game debut	
