= Tank Ledger =

American professional wrestler (born 1999)

- Born: Joseph Spivak; October 11, 1999 (age 27); Darien, Illinois, U.S.
- Professional wrestling career
- Ring name: Tank Ledger
- Billed height: 6 ft 0 in (183 cm)
- Billed weight: 305 lb (138 kg)
- Billed from: Chicago, Illinois
- Trained by: WWE Performance Center
- Debut: October 11, 2022
- Football career

No. 1
- Position: Defensive lineman

Personal information
- Listed height: 5 ft 11 in (1.80 m)
- Listed weight: 300 lb (136 kg)

Career information
- High school: Montini Catholic High School
- College: Northwestern Wildcats (2017–2021)

Joseph Spivak (born October 11, 1999) is an American professional wrestler and former football player. He is signed to WWE, where he performs on the NXT brand under the ring name Tank Ledger. He is one-half of Hank and Tank with Hank Walker, where they are former NXT Tag Team Champions.

== Football career ==
Spivak was a defensive lineman for the Northwestern Wildcats from 2017 to 2021. He began his career as a non-scholarship walkon and eventually became a team captain. Spivak’s Northwestern teams won the Music City Bowl in 2017, the Holiday Bowl in 2018, a Big Ten West championship in 2020 and the Citrus Bowl in 2021. Spivak was also on the Wuerffel Trophy watchlist in 2021. Spivak’s personality and commitment to the team made him a team- and fan-favorite; during the 2021 season, he wore the “prestigious” No. 1 jersey, which the Northwestern football program awarded to “the student-athlete who truly embodies the values and character of the Northwestern football family.”

== Professional wrestling career ==
=== WWE (2022–present) ===
On August 16, 2022, Spivak signed with professional wrestling promotion WWE as part of its new Next In Line program to develop college athletes into potential WWE wrestlers. Spivak, going under the ring name Tank Ledger, made his in-ring debut on the October 14, 2022 (taped on October 11) episode of NXT Level Up, teaming with Ikemen Jiro to defeat Bryson Montana and Duke Hudson.

In March 2023, Ledger began teaming with Hank Walker as Hank and Tank. On December 14, 2024, at an event of Reality of Wrestling (ROW), Hank and Tank won the ROW Tag Team Championship, and they lost the titles on March 8, 2025, holding the title for 84 days. On April 15 episode of NXT, Hank and Tank won the tag team gauntlet match to become the number one contenders for the NXT Tag Team Championship at NXT Stand & Deliver. At the event, Hank and Tank defeated Fraxiom (Axiom and Nathan Frazer) to win the NXT Tag Team Championship.

== Other media ==
=== Video games ===
Year	Title	Notes
2026	WWE 2K26	Video game debut

=== Filmography ===
Year	Title	Role	Notes
2026	Agent of Shadows	Tank Abruzzo	Microdrama series; acting debut

== Championships and accomplishments ==
=== Football ===
- Music City Bowl (2017)
- Holiday Bowl (2018)
- Big Ten West championship (2020)
- Citrus Bowl (2021)

=== Professional wrestling ===
- Pro Wrestling Noah
  - GHC Tag Team Championship (1 time) – with Hank Walker
- Reality of Wrestling
  - ROW Tag Team Championship (2 times, current) – with Hank Walker
- WWE
  - NXT Tag Team Championship (1 time) – with Hank Walker
