= SummerSlam (2026) =

WWE premium live event

- Promotional poster featuring Oba Femi and Brock Lesnar
- Promotion: WWE
- Brand(s): Raw; SmackDown
- Date: August 1–2, 2026
- City: Minneapolis, Minnesota
- Venue: U.S. Bank Stadium
- Attendance: Night 1: 36,683; Night 2: 33,086; Combined: 69,769

WWE event chronology
← Previous; Saturday Night's Main Event XLV	Next → NXT Heatwave

SummerSlam chronology
← Previous; 2025	Next → —

The 2026 SummerSlam, also promoted as SummerSlam: Minnesota, was a two-part professional wrestling premium live event (PLE) produced by WWE, held for wrestlers from the promotion's main roster brands, Raw and SmackDown. It was the 39th annual SummerSlam and took place as a two-night event on Saturday, August 1, and Sunday, August 2, 2026, at U.S. Bank Stadium in Minneapolis, Minnesota. The event was notable for featuring Brock Lesnar's final professional wrestling match due to his retirement following the event.

The card included 12 matches, split evenly between both nights. In the main event of Night 1, Raw's Oba Femi defeated Brock Lesnar in a Hell in a Cell match in the final match of Lesnar's career; while not from Minnesota, Lesnar competed in collegiate wrestling at the University of Minnesota where he won the NCAA Division I national championship in 2000. In other prominent matches, CM Punk defeated Cody Rhodes to retain SmackDown's Undisputed WWE Championship and Liv Morgan defeated Iyo Sky to retain Raw's Women's World Championship. In the main event of Night 2, Roman Reigns defeated Seth Rollins to retain Raw's World Heavyweight Championship. Elsewhere on the card, Minneapolis native Chad Gable defeated Penta to win Raw's WWE Intercontinental Championship and Chelsea Green won a five-way ladder match to become SmackDown's interim WWE Women's Champion; this was later retroactively amended to make Green the official WWE Women's Champion due to Rhea Ripley, the lineal champion at the time, sustaining an injury and was out indefinitely.

This was the second SummerSlam to be held in Minneapolis, after 1999 at the Target Center. The event saw the WWE in-ring debut of Nick Aldis, which was his first match since October 2023 on the independent circuit. Night 1 also featured the return of Randy Orton, who had been on hiatus since WrestleMania 42 earlier that year in April, while Night 2 saw the return of Kevin Owens, who had been out with an injury since April 2025. This was also the first SummerSlam to air on ESPN Unlimited in the United States, as well as the final on Abema in Japan, which moved to Netflix in October.

== Production ==
=== Background ===
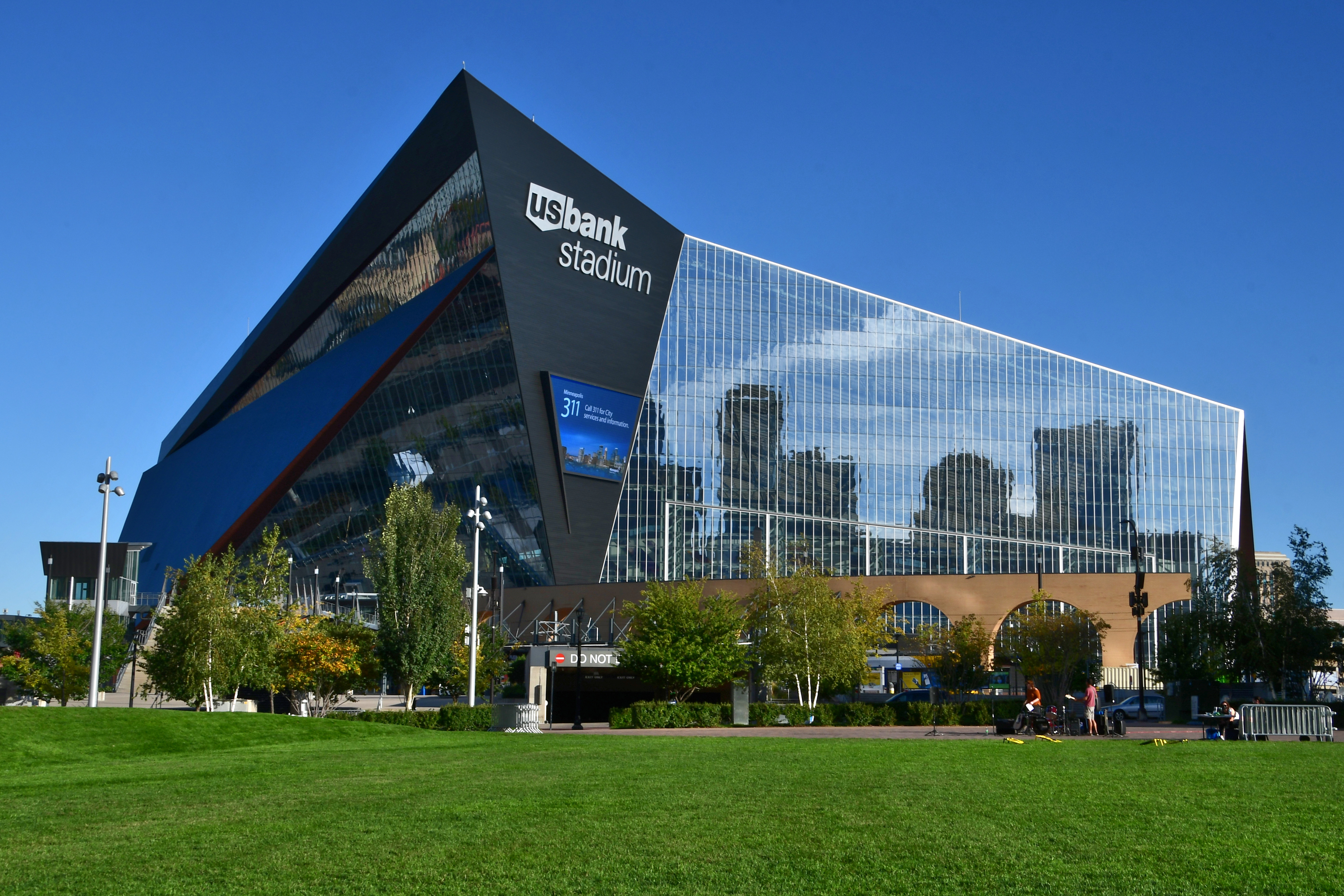
The 39th annual SummerSlam took place at U.S. Bank Stadium in Minneapolis, Minnesota, which was the second SummerSlam in Minnesota, after 1999.

SummerSlam is an annual professional wrestling premium live event (PLE), traditionally held in August by WWE since 1988. It was originally broadcast exclusively via pay-per-view (PPV) before it began simulcasting on WWE's livestreaming platforms in 2014. Dubbed "The Biggest Party of the Summer", it is one of the promotion's original four PPVs, along with WrestleMania, Royal Rumble, and Survivor Series, referred to as the "Big Four", and as of August 2021, it is considered one of the "Big Five", along with Money in the Bank. Out of the five, it is considered WWE's second biggest event of the year behind WrestleMania.

Announced on May 23, 2024, the 39th SummerSlam was scheduled to be held as a two-night event on Saturday, August 1, and Sunday, August 2, 2026, at U.S. Bank Stadium in Minneapolis, Minnesota and featured wrestlers from the Raw and SmackDown brand divisions. The event was in turn promoted as SummerSlam: Minnesota and was WWE's first stadium event held in Minneapolis. It was subsequently the second SummerSlam held in Minneapolis, after the 1999 event at the Target Center. This would also be the second SummerSlam to be held across two nights, although it was originally announced to be the first two-night SummerSlam before the 2025 edition was expanded to two nights.

=== Broadcast outlets ===
Both nights of SummerSlam were broadcast on traditional PPV outlets worldwide. They were also available to livestream on the ESPN Unlimited in the United States, SuperSport in Sub-Saharan Africa, Abema in Japan, and Netflix everywhere else. This marked the first SummerSlam to livestream on ESPN's app in the United States, as WWE's contract with Peacock to air main roster PLEs expired at the conclusion of Clash in Paris in August 2025.

Additionally, audio coverage of SummerSlam hosted by NXT commentators Vic Joseph and Booker T was available on the SiriusXM satellite radio channel WWE Radio (formerly Pro Wrestling Nation 24/7), which relaunched shortly before the event in partnership with WWE.

=== Storylines ===
The card included 12 matches, split evenly between both nights, that resulted from scripted storylines. Results were predetermined by WWE's writers on the Raw and SmackDown brands, while storylines were produced on WWE's weekly television programs, Monday Night Raw and Friday Night SmackDown.

==== Main event matches ====
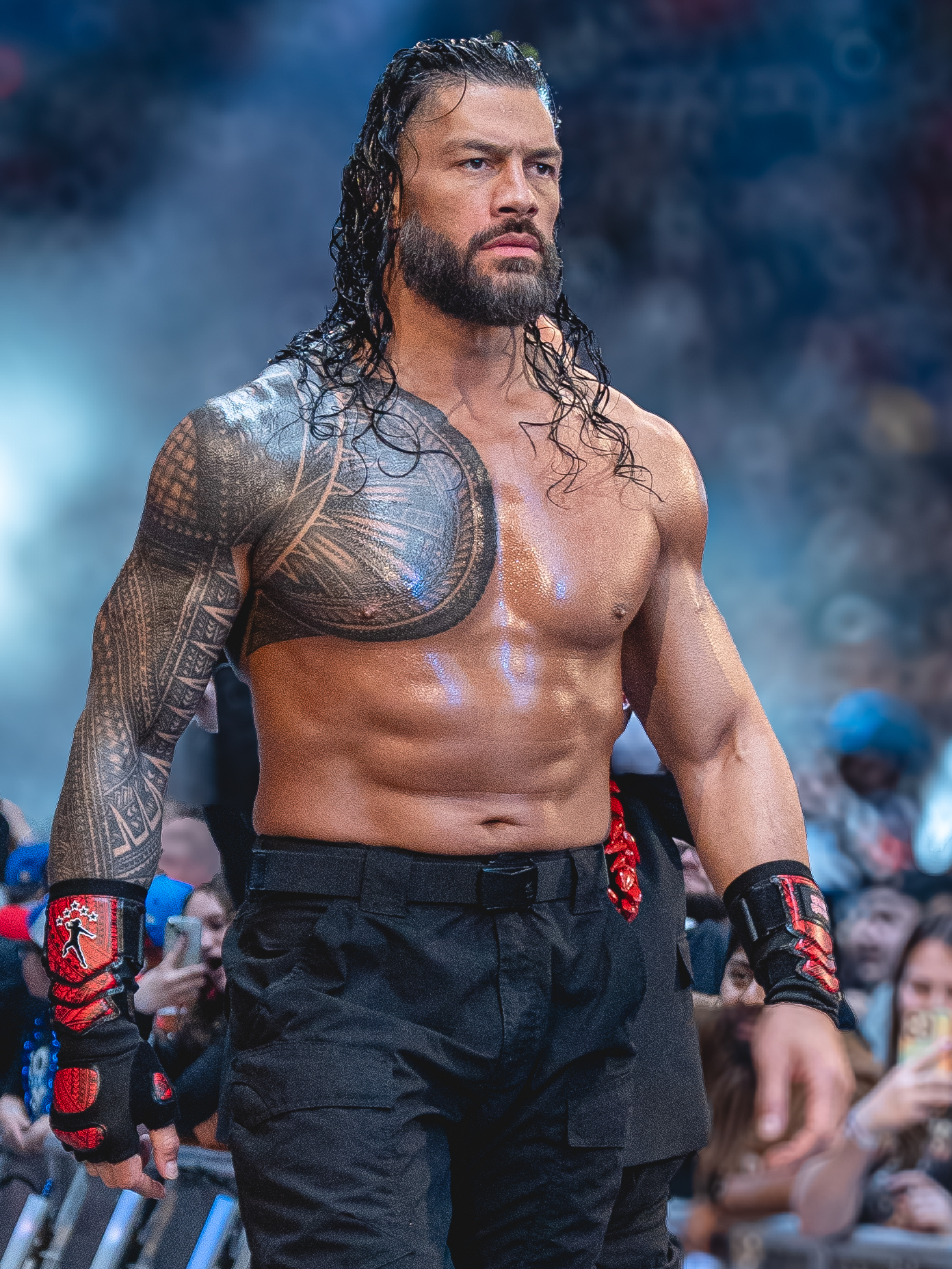
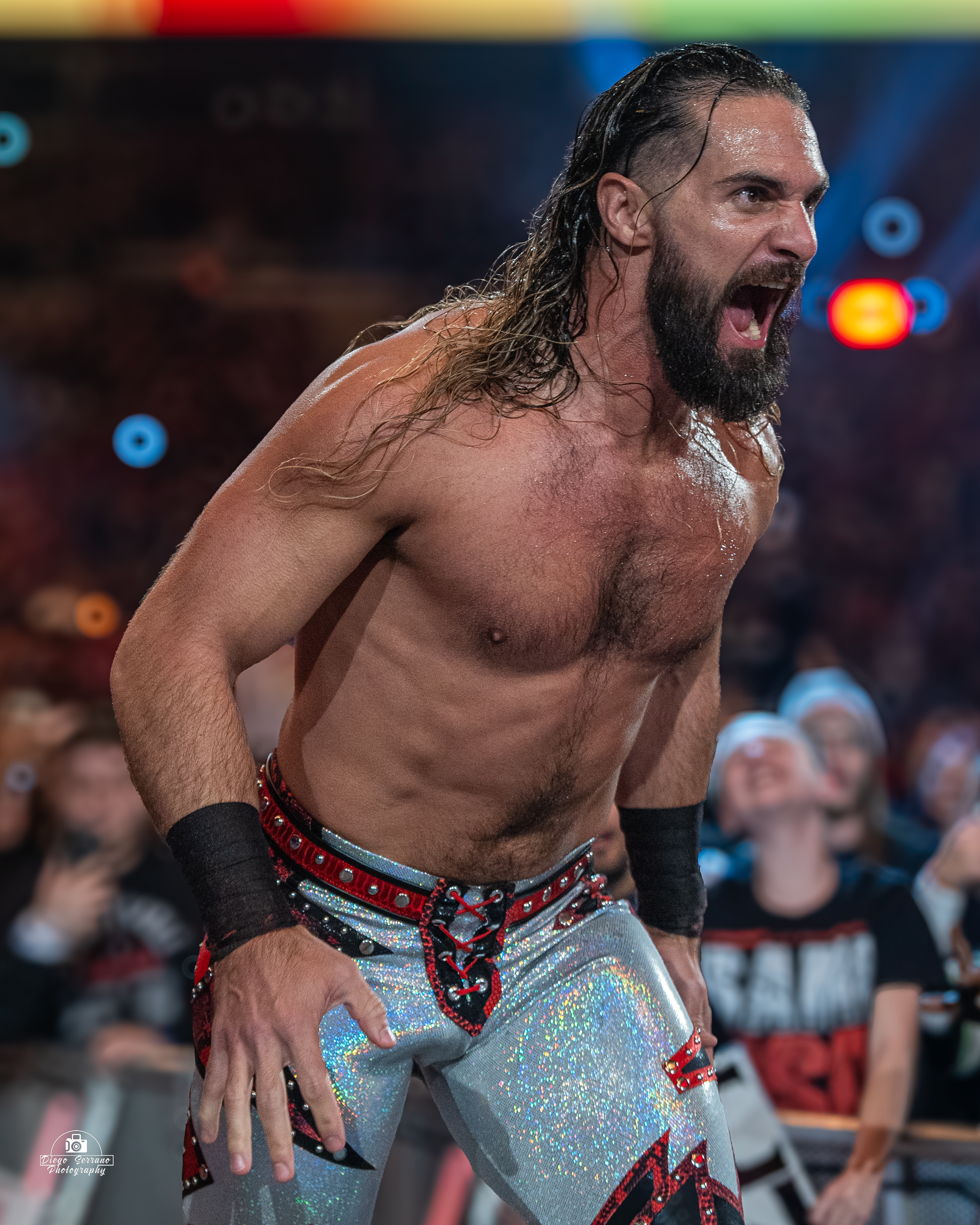
In what was promoted as their last match against each other, Roman Reigns defended Raw's World Heavyweight Championship against career rival Seth Rollins.

On the June 29 episode of Raw, Seth Rollins confrontef World Heavyweight Champion Roman Reigns. Rollins, who never lost the World Heavyweight Championship when he last held it as he had to vacate it in October 2025 due to an injury, claimed that Reigns possessed something that belonged to him. Reigns rejected this assertion, arguing that Rollins had not earned a title shot. Rollins countered by insisting he had always dominated Reigns since striking his back with a steel chair in June 2014 and ultimately ending their former stable, The Shield. He subsequently offered Reigns a chance to defeat him in what might be his "last chance". Reigns responded that he wanted his entire family to witness him defeat Rollins before accepting Rollins's challenge for the title at SummerSlam. The match was scheduled as the main event of night two.

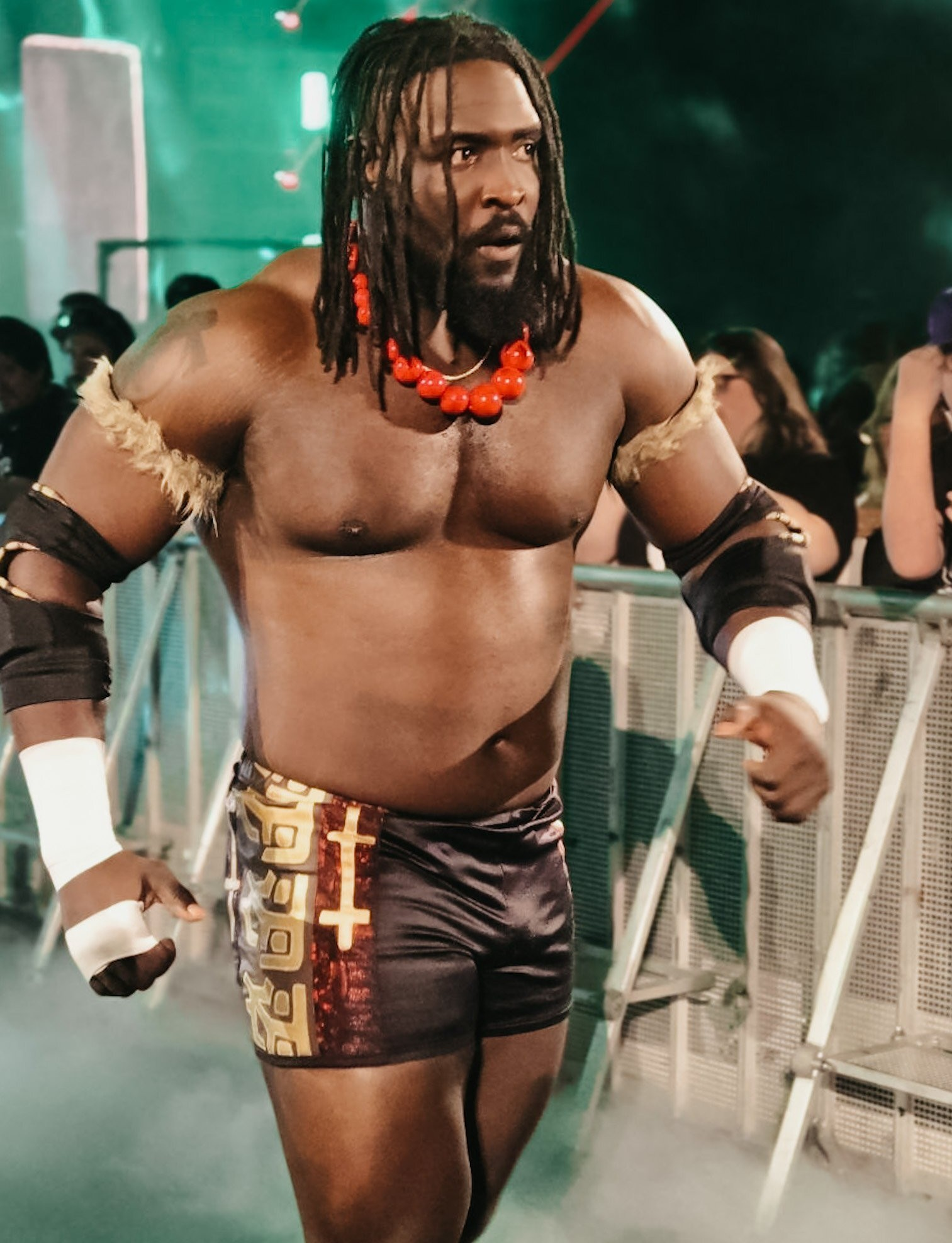
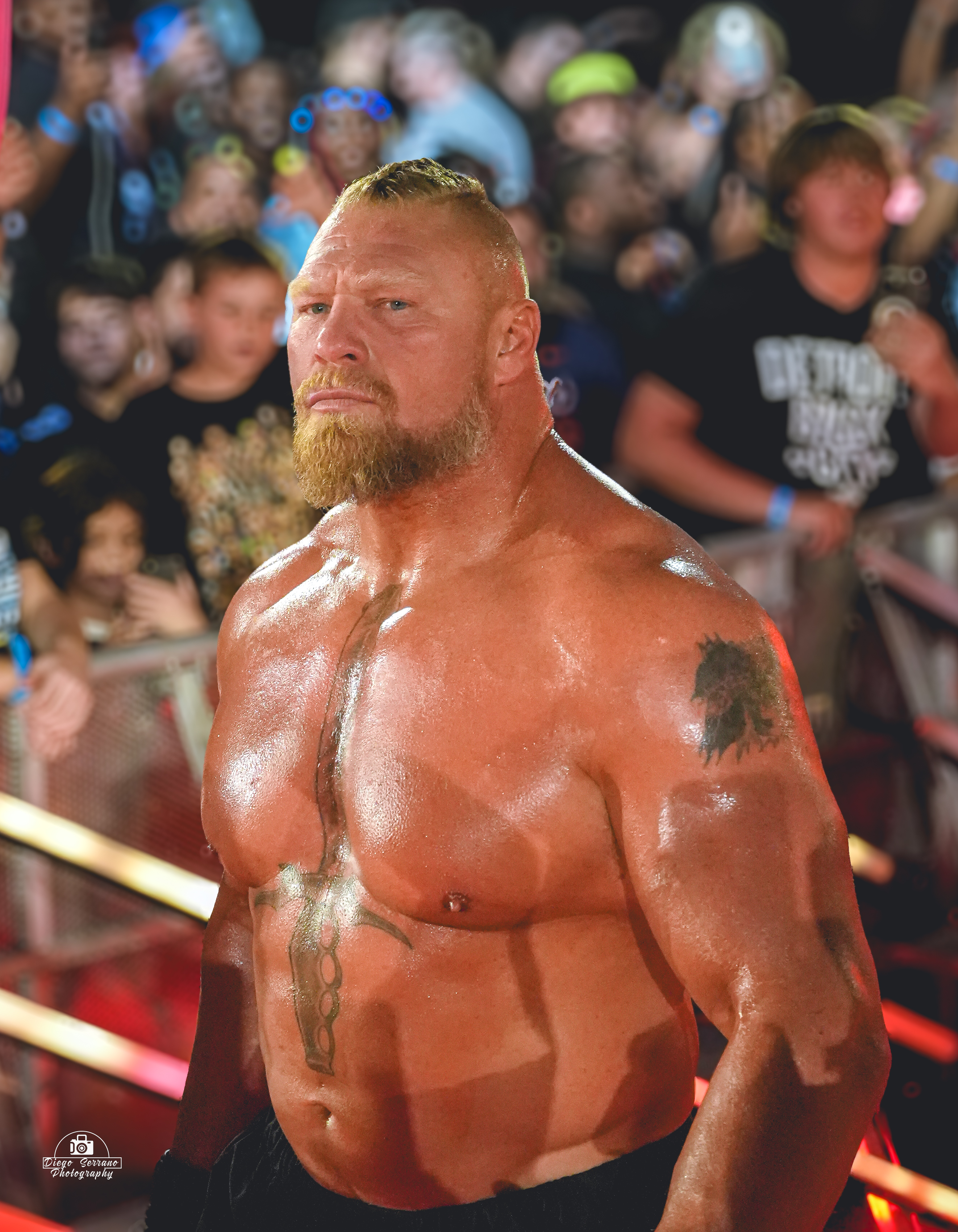
Oba Femi relinquished his 2026 King of the Ring championship opportunity to instead face Brock Lesnar in a Hell in a Cell match.

At WrestleMania 42 Night 2 on April 19, Oba Femi defeated Brock Lesnar. Following the match, an emotional Lesnar removed his gloves and boots and left them in the center of the ring, seemingly retiring from professional wrestling. In the weeks that followed, Femi held weekly open challenges on Raw where he remained unbeaten. As Femi was about to have another open challenge on the May 18 episode, he was attacked by a returning Lesnar, who performed four F-5s on Femi. Later that night, Lesnar's advocate Paul Heyman handed Raw General Manager Adam Pearce a contract for a rematch between Lesnar and Femi at Clash in Italy on May 31, where Lesnar defeated Femi after seven F-5s. At Night of Champions on June 27, Femi won the King of the Ring tournament to earn a world championship match of his choice at SummerSlam. As Femi was celebrating his win on the following Raw, Lesnar attacked Femi with a low blow and an F-5. Femi immediately recovered and challenged Lesnar to a match at SummerSlam. Lesnar accepted on the condition that it would be a Hell in a Cell match. The match was made official later that night with Femi relinquishing his championship opportunity to instead face Lesnar at the event, later explaining that Lesnar would have cost him his championship match anyway. The match was scheduled as the main event of night one.

==== Undercard matches ====
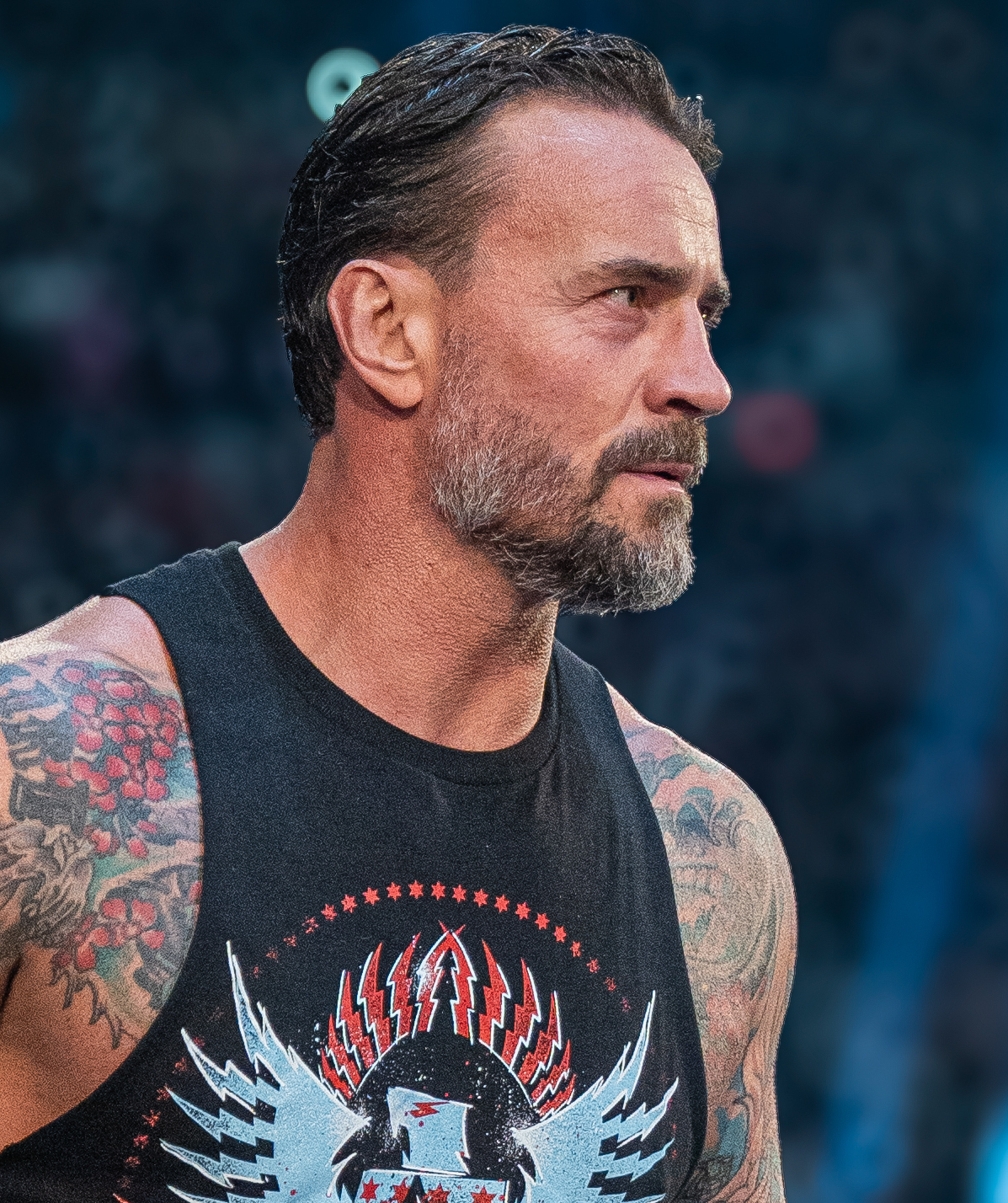
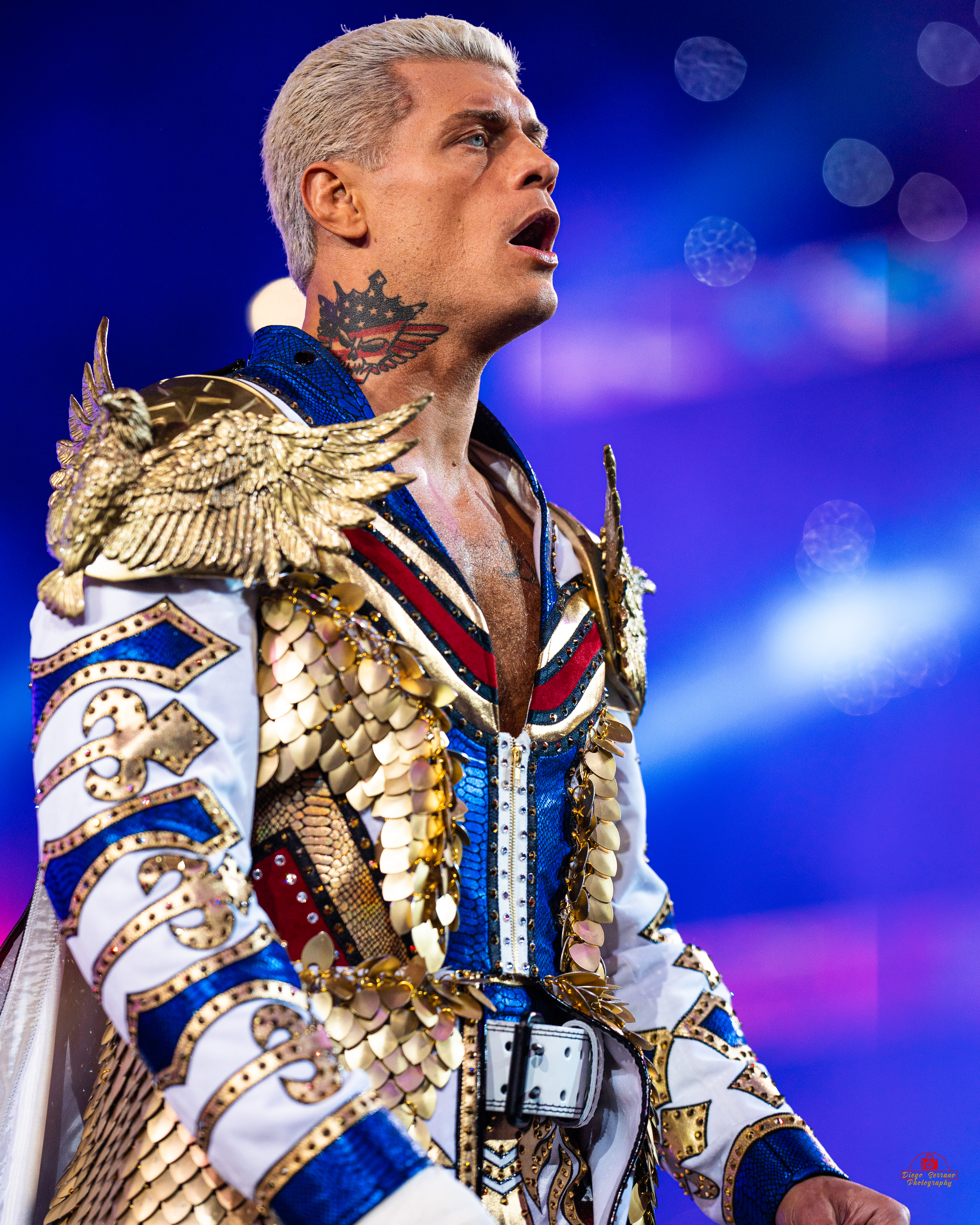
CM Punk defended SmackDown's Undisputed WWE Championship against Cody Rhodes.

At Night of Champions on June 27, Sami Zayn defeated defending champion Cody Rhodes and Gunther in a triple threat match to win the Undisputed WWE Championship. On the July 3 episode of SmackDown, Raw General Manager and interim SmackDown General Manager Adam Pearce scheduled a match between Rhodes and Jey Uso for the right to challenge for the title on the following episode of Raw, which was won by Rhodes later that night. On the July 6 episode of Raw, Gunther attacked Rhodes backstage. Later that night, SmackDown General Manager Nick Aldis appeared and found Rhodes's replacement for the scheduled title match. In the episode's main event, a returning CM Punk, who had been on hiatus since the Raw after WrestleMania 42, replaced Rhodes and defeated Zayn to capture the Undisputed WWE Championship. On the July 10 episode of SmackDown, Punk challenged anyone to face him. Rhodes appeared and recalled that when he was the champion, he told Punk he would face him anytime Punk wanted. Punk then asked "when" which Rhodes responded with "SummerSlam" before they shook hands, and the title match was later made official. The following week, it was announced that should Gunther and Zayn defeat Punk and Rhodes in their scheduled tag team match at Saturday Night's Main Event XLV the next night, then Gunther and Zayn would be added to the title match at SummerSlam to make it a fatal four-way match. Punk and Rhodes defeated Gunther and Zayn to keep their title match one-on-one. The match was scheduled for night one.

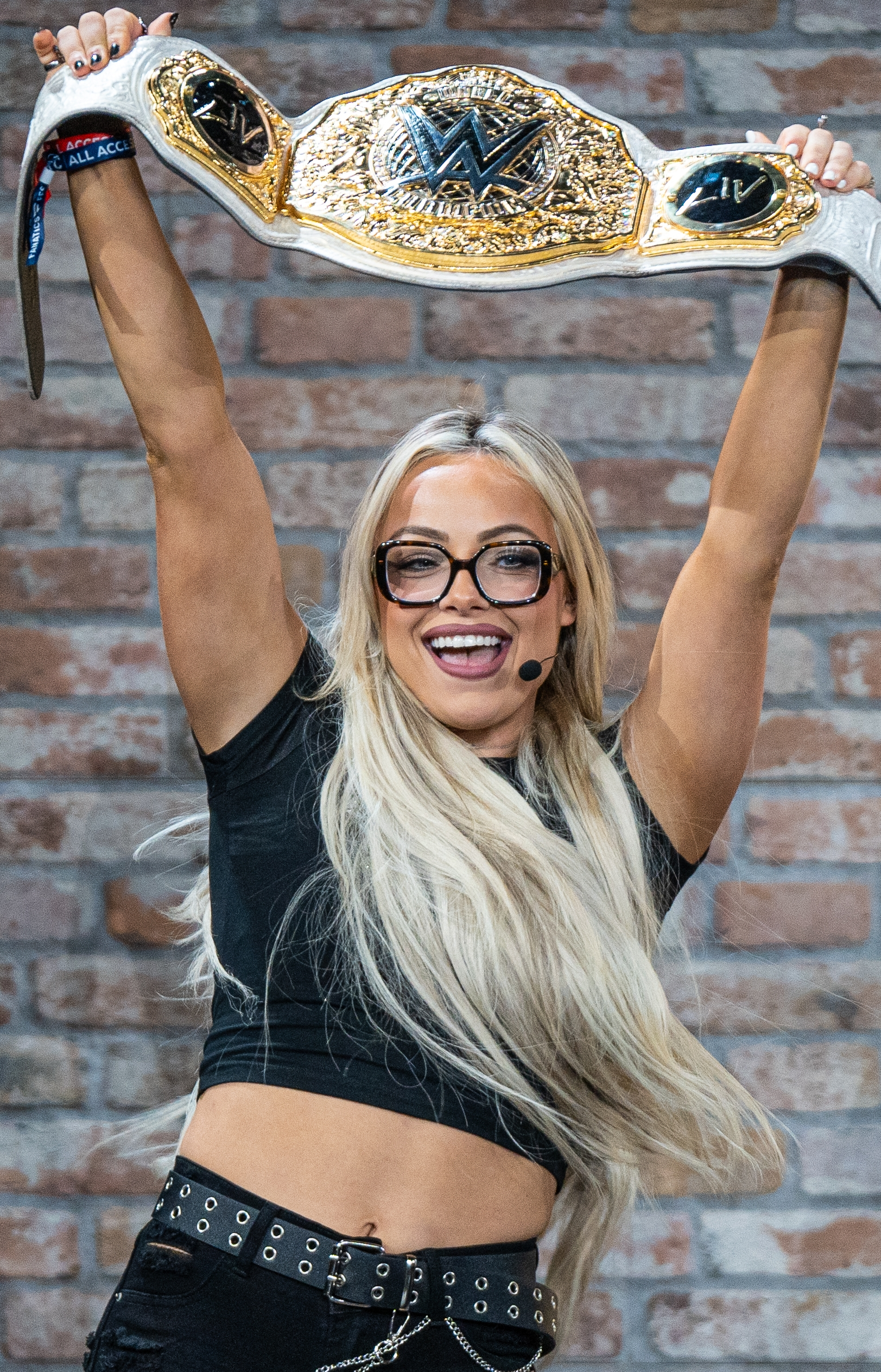
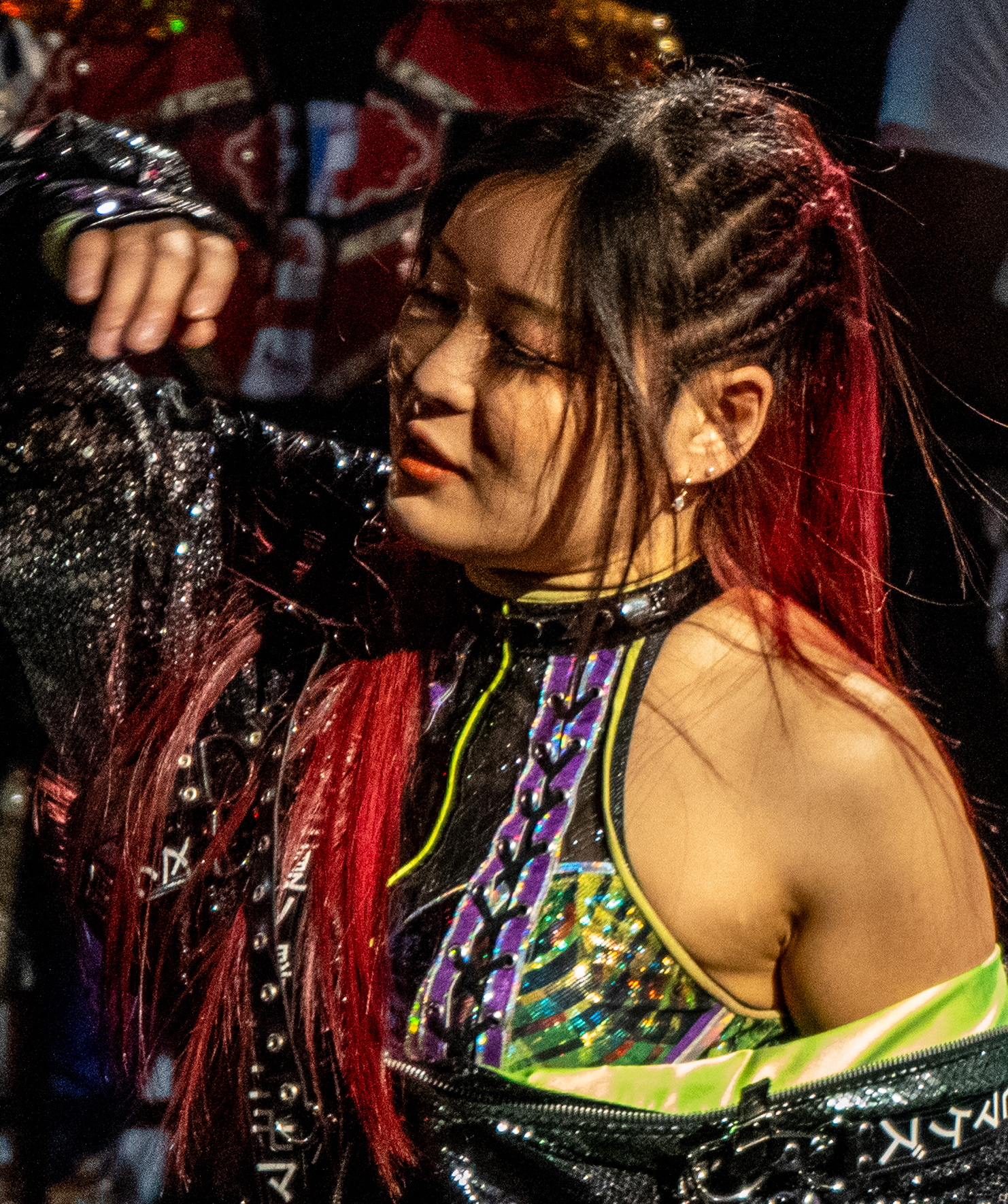
Raw's Women's World Champion Liv Morgan defended her title against 2026 Queen of the Ring winner Iyo Sky.

Throughout June, the 2026 Queen of the Ring tournament was held where the winner would earn a women's world championship match of their choice at SummerSlam. Despite holding Raw's Women's World Championship, Liv Morgan entered the tournament as she wanted to ultimately win SmackDown's WWE Women's Championship to become a double world champion. Both Morgan and fellow Raw wrestler Iyo Sky made it to the final at Night of Champions where Sky defeated Morgan. Following their match, Sky chose to challenge Morgan for the Women's World Championship. The match was scheduled for night one.

On the July 13 episode of Raw, Chad Gable won a gauntlet match to earn a WWE Intercontinental Championship match against Penta at SummerSlam in Gable's hometown of Minneapolis. This setup a rematch between the two from January 2025, where Penta defeated a then-heel Gable in Penta's WWE debut, which ultimately led Gable to become the original El Grande Americano and coming to respect lucha libre after Gable was unmasked in May 2026. The match was scheduled for night two.

In April 2026, Roman Reigns began reforming The Bloodline with his cousins The Usos (Jey Uso and Jimmy Uso). Their cousin Jacob Fatu then joined after Reigns defeated him in Tribal Combat at Clash in Italy the next month. Before the reformation, LA Knight had teamed up several times with The Usos, however, Knight was against the reformation of The Bloodline due to his past issues with the group. Royce Keys, an old friend of Fatu's, also tried convincing Fatu not to join the group. After Fatu joined, he and The Usos went over to SmackDown to try and convince Solo Sikoa to rejoin—after Reigns went on hiatus in April 2024 and left The Bloodline fractured, Sikoa formed his own version called The MFTs, which had included Fatu until mid-2025 before Sikoa was kicked out himself in June 2026. Sikoa appeared on the July 13 episode of Raw to seemingly rejoin, but instead attacked his older brothers The Usos and cousin Fatu. Following this, Knight challenged The Bloodline (Fatu and The Usos) to face himself, Keys, and Sikoa in six-man tag team match at SummerSlam, which was subsequently confirmed. The match was scheduled for night one.

At WrestleMania 42 Night 2, Rhea Ripley defeated Jade Cargill to win the WWE Women's Championship. Ripley retained the title in a rematch at Clash in Italy, however, she sustained a torn meniscus. Due to her injury, Ripley was largely absent from SmackDown following the event. On July 17, Raw General Manager and interim SmackDown General Manager Adam Pearce confirmed that Ripley would not compete at SummerSlam and instead, it was announced that an interim champion would be crowned until Ripley's return, determined by a five-woman ladder match at SummerSlam. Qualifying matches began that night on SmackDown, where Tiffany Stratton and Cargill advanced by defeating Jacy Jayne and Nia Jax, respectively; Cargill advanced after Charlotte Flair attacked her, causing a disqualification win for Cargill. Jax was then given another chance in a qualifying match on the following week's episode against Flair, who also won by disqualification after Cargill's interference. Also on that episode, Chelsea Green qualified by defeating Kiana James. The ladder match was then confirmed for night two. The final qualifying match took place on the SmackDown the night before SummerSlam, where Lash Legend defeated Giulia.

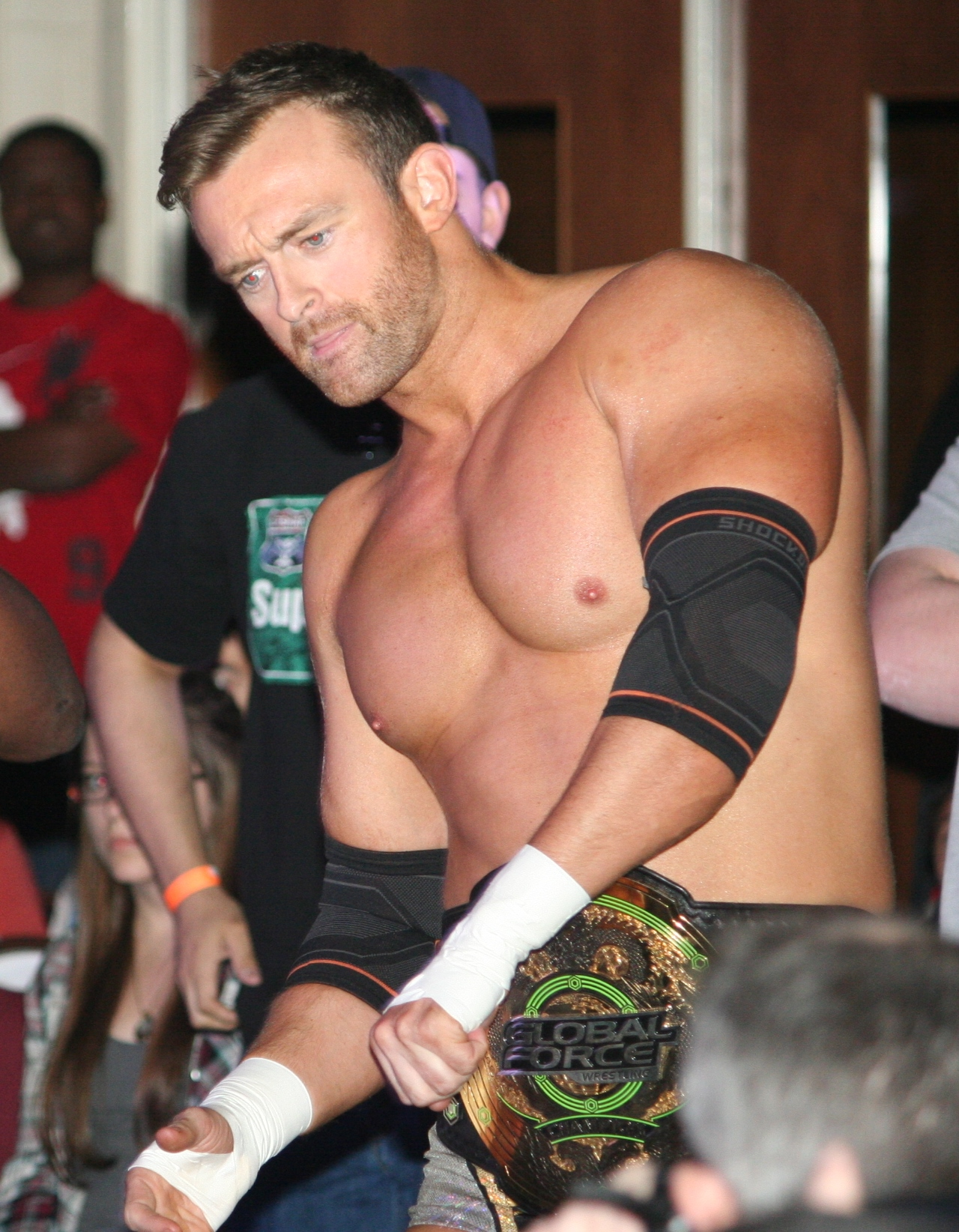
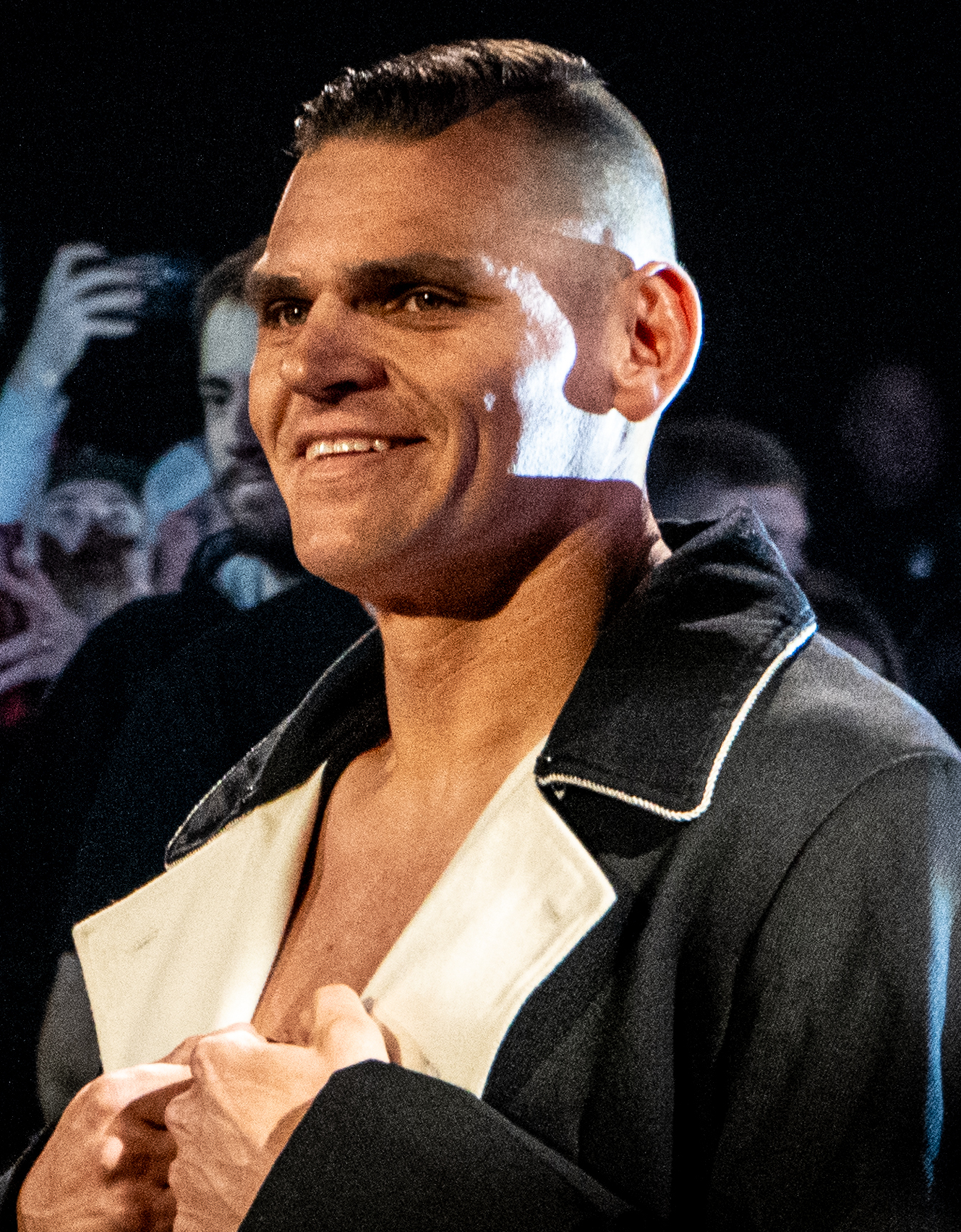
Nick Aldis, who had served as the on-screen general manager of SmackDown since joining WWE in 2023, temporarily gave up his executive position to face Gunther, marking Aldis's WWE in-ring debut.

After a controversial loss to then-Undisputed WWE Champion Cody Rhodes at Clash in Italy, Gunther threatened SmackDown General Manager Nick Aldis with a lawsuit if he did not get a rematch. On SmackDown two weeks later, Gunther failed to capture the title again because of Sami Zayn, who Gunther chose as the special guest referee. Later that night, Gunther accused Aldis of being the only reason he failed to win the title, demanding another rematch at Night of Champions. After Zayn won the title against Rhodes and Gunther in a triple threat match at the event, Gunther had a physical confrontation with Aldis on the post-show, calling Aldis a "failed wrestler". On the following episode of Raw, commentator Michael Cole announced that Aldis was placed on administrative leave. After Aldis was reinstated as SmackDown General Manager on the July 10 episode of SmackDown, Gunther demanded a spot in the Undisputed WWE Championship match at SummerSlam. Later that night, Aldis announced that Gunther and Zayn would face Rhodes and CM Punk, who had defeated Zayn to win the title, at Saturday Night's Main Event XLV. Aldis told Gunther that he needed to fix the mistake of thinking that he would not be a big issue on SmackDown before Gunther attacked Aldis, repeatedly applying the sleeper hold as referees and producers tried to pull him away. It was subsequently revealed that if Gunther and Zayn could defeat Rhodes and Punk, they would be inserted into the title match between Punk and Rhodes at SummerSlam to make it a fatal four-way match. At the event, Aldis prevented Gunther and Zayn from winning the match, pulling out a referee as Gunther attempted a pinfall and hitting Gunther with the title belt. During the SummerSlam Kickoff show the next day, Gunther frustratingly asked WWE Chief Content Officer Paul "Triple H" Levesque what he would do to Aldis for causing the loss. Gunther and Aldis then brawled until security pulled them apart. Triple H then announced that Gunther would face Aldis at SummerSlam, which would be Aldis's WWE in-ring debut and his first match since October 2023, which was on the independent circuit. During the contract signing on the following SmackDown, it was revealed that in order for the match to be made official, Aldis would have to relinquish his position as SmackDown General Manager, the duties of which would transfer fully to Adam Pearce, and Aldis agreed. The match was scheduled for night one.

On the June 15 episode of Raw, Women's World Champion Liv Morgan unsuccessfully attempted to pay Danhausen US$100,000 to curse Oba Femi, the opponent of her on-screen boyfriend and Judgment Day stablemate Dominik Mysterio in the semifinals of the King of the Ring tournament. Danhausen subsequently stole the money and cursed the entire group (Morgan, Mysterio, JD McDonagh, Raquel Rodriguez, and Roxanne Perez) as they went on a losing streak. At Saturday Night's Main Event XLV on July 18, Danhausen defeated McDonagh in a No Disqualification match. On the following Raw, Danhausen and The Judgment Day continued to fight over the money. It was subsequently announced that Danhausen and Mysterio would face each other at SummerSlam, where the winner would keep the $100,000. The match was scheduled for night two. On the final Raw before SummerSlam, Danhausen was attacked by Mysterio and McDonagh. Raw General Manager Adam Pearce then stated that Danhausen should return the money to Mysterio, however, Danhausen declined and instead stated that he wanted his match against Mysterio to be a Human Monies on a Pole match, which Pearce agreed.

At Night of Champions, Sami Zayn won the Undisputed WWE Championship, however, he lost the title just nine days later to a returning CM Punk. At Saturday Night's Main Event XLV, Zayn and Gunther faced Punk and Cody Rhodes, where had Gunther and Zayn won, they would have been added to Punk and Rhodes's title match at SummerSlam; however, they lost after interference from Nick Aldis, who attacked Gunther. On that week's SmackDown, Zayn demanded to acting SmackDown General Manager Adam Pearce to be inserted into Punk and Rhodes's match, however, Pearce declined and announced that at SummerSlam, Zayn would face the winner of a fatal-four-way match, scheduled for later that night, to determine the #1 contender for the Undisputed WWE Championship, which Zayn reluctantly accepted. The fatal-four-way was won by Finn Bálor, and the match was scheduled for night two.

On the April 24 episode of SmackDown, Fatal Influence (Jacy Jayne, Fallon Henley, and Lainey Reid) made their main roster debut, attacking WWE Women's Tag Team Champions Brie Bella and Paige. Afterwards, both teams began a rivalry, culminating in a match for the title at Saturday Night's Main Event XLV where Henley and Reid won the championship. On that week's SmackDown, Brie defeated Reid, but after the match, Brie and Paige were attacked by the rest of Fatal Influence. Brie's twin sister Nikki Bella, who had been dealing with an injury since April, made a surprise return, aiding Brie and Paige. Nikki subsequently announced that herself, Brie, and Paige would face Fatal Influence in a six-woman tag team match at SummerSlam. The match was scheduled for night one.

On the July 10 episode of SmackDown, Baron Corbin, who had left WWE in November 2024 after his contract expired, made a surprise return to WWE by attacking Trick Williams and Carmelo Hayes before holding up Williams's WWE United States Championship, signaling his intention to challenge for the title. Two weeks later after SmackDown went off the air, Corbin once again attacked Williams, leading the champion to challenge him to a match with the title on the line at SummerSlam, which Corbin accepted, and it was subsequently made official. The match was scheduled for night two.

== Event ==
=== Night 1 ===
Other on-screen personnel – Saturday
Role:	Name:
English commentators	Michael Cole
English commentators	Wade Barrett
Spanish commentators	Marcelo Rodríguez
Spanish commentators	Jerry Soto
Radio commentators	Vic Joseph
Radio commentators	Booker T
Ring announcer	Alicia Taylor
Referees	Adrian Butler
Referees	Jessika Carr
Referees	Dan Engler
Referees	Daphanie LaShaunn
Referees	Chad Patton
Referees	Charles Robinson
Interviewers	Cathy Kelley
Interviewers	Byron Saxton
Interviewers	Jackie Redmond
Pre-show panel	Joe Tessitore
Pre-show panel	Big E
Pre-show panel	Corey Graves
Pre-show panel	Peter Rosenberg

==== Preliminary matches ====
Night 1 opened with Liv Morgan defending Raw's Women's World Championship against Iyo Sky. As Sky climbed to the top turnbuckle, Morgan's Judgment Day stablemate Roxanne Perez distracted the referee, which allowed Judgment Day member Raquel Rodriguez to shove Sky off the ropes. Sky later neutralized Perez and Rodriguez by diving onto them on the outside. She attacked Morgan with Morgan's own finishing maneuver the "ObLIVion", in which Sky jumped up to Sky as she stood against the ropes before pulling her head into the mat, for a near-fall. When Sky attempted a dive onto a supine Morgan, Morgan countered it with her feet and executed the "ObLIVion" to retain the title via pinfall.

Next was an interpromotional match in which the team of Raw's LA Knight and SmackDown's Royce Keys and Solo Sikoa battled Raw's The Bloodline (Jacob Fatu, Jey Uso, and Jimmy Uso). Keys powerbombed Fatu, in which Keys lifted Fatu up to his shoulders before slamming Fatu down, into the timekeeper's area. In the ring, as Jey and Jimmy prepared for a double-team maneuver on Knight, Sikoa neutralized Jimmy with the "Samoan Spike", striking Jimmy's throat with his thumb, which distracted Jey. Knight took advantage and performed the "BFT" on Jey, in which Knight drove Jey's head into the mat while falling forwards, to win the match via pinfall.

After that, Gunther faced Nick Aldis. Aldis applied a submission hold on Gunther, however, Gunther reached the ring ropes to void the submission. Gunther then shoved Aldis into the corner and applied a sleeper hold. Aldis reversed it, however, Gunther re-applied the hold and forced Aldis to tap out. Thus, Gunther won the match via submission.

In the fourth match, Paige and The Bella Twins (Nikki Bella and Brie Bella) faced SmackDown's Fatal Influence (Jacy Jayne, Fallon Henley, and Lainey Reid). As The Bella Twins attempted a double-team maneuver on Reid, Henley pulled Brie out of the ring. Henley and Reid then worked together to attack Nikki, however, the ensuing pinfall attempt was broken up by Paige. After Paige tagged in, Henley distracted her, and Jayne executed the "Rolling Encore", in which Jayne spun around before punching Paige's face, to win the match via pinfall. Following the match, The Bella Twins attacked Paige, turning heel in the process; Nikki particularly targeted Paige's surgically repaired neck.

In the penultimate match, CM Punk defended SmackDown's Undisputed WWE Championship against Cody Rhodes. After Punk kicked Rhodes with his leg, Punk was noticeably holding his left knee, which Rhodes began to target. Punk later placed Rhodes on the announce table before attempting an elbow drop off the top rope, however, Rhodes dodged and Punk crashed through the table and landed on his damaged knee instead. When Punk evaded Rhodes' attack, Rhodes accidentally incapacitated the referee instead. Punk performed the "GTS", in which Punk placed Rhodes on his shoulders before striking Rhodes' face with his knee, and attempted a pin, but no referee was available to count a pinfall attempt. Rhodes then executed the "Cross Rhodes", bending Punk backwards before twisting Punk to make him fall face-first; however, Punk rolled to the outside. Randy Orton, who had been absent since his loss to Rhodes at WrestleMania 42 in April, then appeared in the ring and attacked Rhodes with the "RKO", jumping up to Rhodes and grabbing his head to force him to fall face-first. Punk then returned to the ring and performed the "GTS" on Rhodes to win the match via pinfall and retain his title.

==== Main event ====
The main event was the Hell in a Cell match between Raw's Oba Femi and Brock Lesnar (accompanied by Paul Heyman), where the competitors were locked in a caged structure of 20 ft (6.1 m) and five tons that enclosed the ring and ringside area with no disqualifications; the only ways to win were by pinfall or submission. Lesnar executed three consecutive German suplexes, in which Lesnar lifted Femi up from behind before bridging backward and slamming Femi shoulder-first. However, Femi recovered quickly to attack Lesnar with a clothesline, in which Femi charged at Lesnar with his outstretched arm to strike Lesnar's torso, to send him to the outside. Femi later drove Lesnar into a table positioned against the cell. Lesnar then responded by striking Femi with the steel steps. Lesnar later exposed the wooden boards in the ring before executing a tombstone piledriver onto the exposed boards, in which Lesnar positioned Femi upside down before kneeling down to drive Femi's head down for a near-fall. When Lesnar attempted to strike with a steel chair, Femi knocked it out of Lesnar's hands before performing the "Fall From Grace", in which Femi lifted Lesnar up to his shoulders before slamming Lesnar down. Femi then pinned Lesnar to win the match. Following the match, Lesnar embraced Femi and endorsed him as the future of WWE.

=== Night 2 ===
Other on-screen personnel – Sunday
Role:	Name:
English commentators	Michael Cole
English commentators	Wade Barrett
Spanish commentators	Marcelo Rodríguez
Spanish commentators	Jerry Soto
Radio commentators	Vic Joseph
Radio commentators	Booker T
Ring announcer	Alicia Taylor
Referees	Danilo Anfibio
Referees	Jason Ayers
Referees	Shawn Bennett
Referees	Adrian Butler
Referees	Chip Danning
Referees	Eddie Orengo
Referees	Ryan Tran
Referees	Rod Zapata
Interviewers	Cathy Kelley
Interviewers	Byron Saxton
Interviewers	Jackie Redmond
Pre-show panel	Joe Tessitore
Pre-show panel	Big E
Pre-show panel	Corey Graves
Pre-show panel	Peter Rosenberg

==== Preliminary matches ====
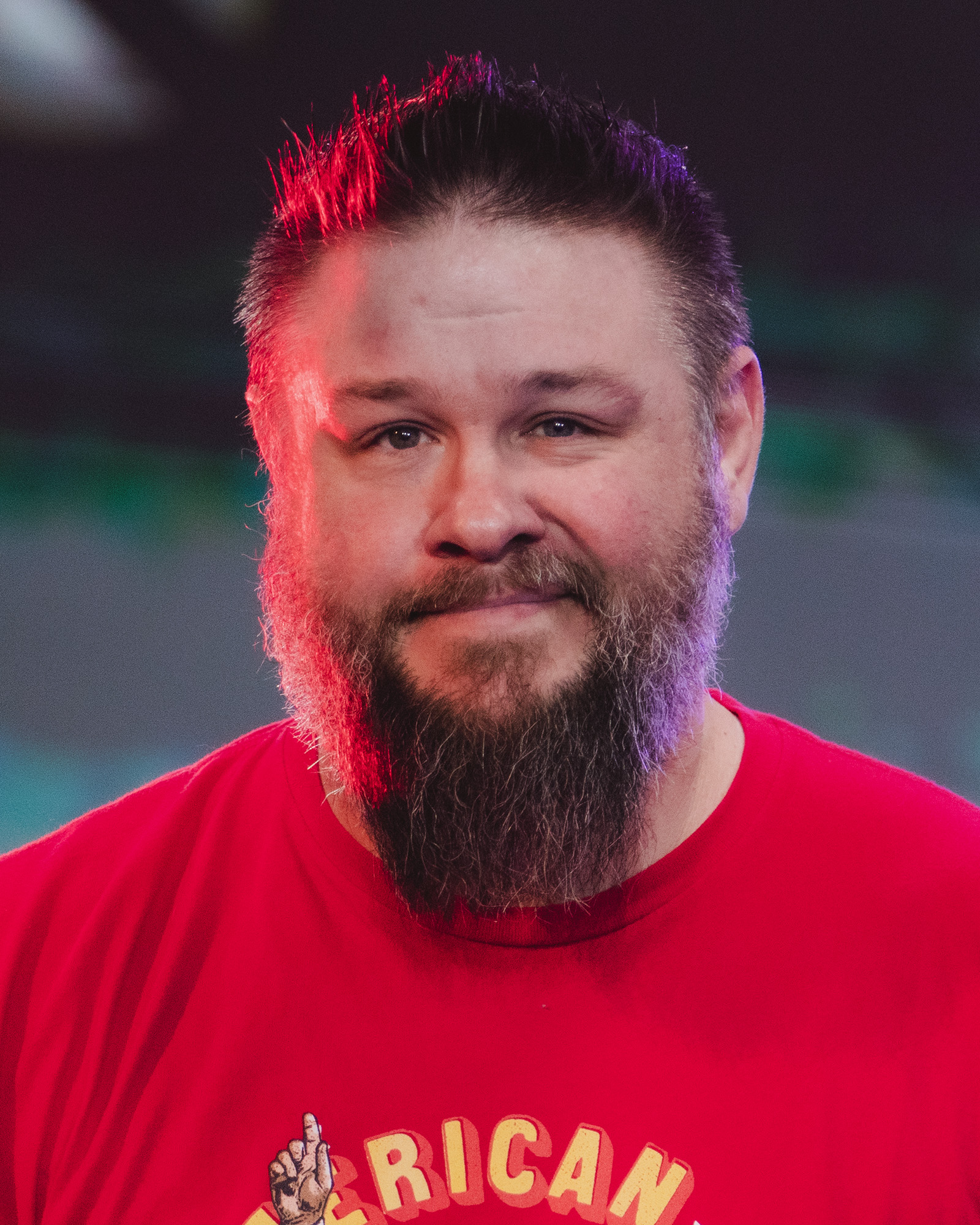
After sustaining a neck injury in April 2025, Kevin Owens was on hiatus, however, he made his return on Night 2 of SummerSlam.

Night 2 opened with Sami Zayn versus Finn Bálor to determine the number one contender for SmackDown's Undisputed WWE Championship. Before the match began, reinstated SmackDown General Manager Nick Aldis added Gunther to the match before also adding a returning Kevin Owens, who had been out with an injury since April 2025, making it a fatal four-way match, where the first competitor to pin or submit an opponent wins. As Gunther applied a sleeper hold on Zayn, Bálor performed a "Coup de Grâce" on Zayn, in which Bálor dove off the top rope to stomp Zayn's chest with his feet, to void the submission. Balor followed with a pin attempt, however, Gunther voided the pin attempt. Owens then attacked Bálor and Gunther with stunners, grabbing his opponent down before dropping down to a seated position to force his opponent's jaw to hit his shoulder. As Owens attempted a stunner on Zayn, however, Zayn countered and performed the "Blue Thunder Bomb", in which Zayn lifted Owens up to his shoulders as he spun around before slamming Owens down, for a near-fall. Zayn prepared to kick Owens' face, however, Owens attacked Zayn's chin with a kick instead. Owens then performed a stunner on Zayn to win the match via pinfall.

Next, Trick Williams (accompanied by Lil Yachty) defended SmackDown's WWE United States Championship against Baron Corbin. After raking Williams' eyes, Corbin ran towards the ropes, but Yachty hit him with a kendo stick; the referee missed both attacks. Corbin later grabbed the title belt, which prompted Yachty to confront him. Corbin then hit Williams with the title belt while the referee was distracted from dealing with Yachty. Corbin then executed the "End of Days", in which Corbin grabbed Williams mid-air with his right arm before falling backwards to plant Williams face-first into the mat, to get the pinfall victory and win the title.

The third match was a five-way ladder match for SmackDown's interim WWE Women's Championship, featuring Chelsea Green, Charlotte Flair, Jade Cargill, Lash Legend, and Tiffany Stratton. In this match, the first competitor to climb a ladder and retrieve the title belt that was hung above the ring would win the match. As Stratton climbed a ladder to retrieve the belt, Green tipped the ladder over to send her crashing down onto the other competitors on the outside. B-Fab and Michin ran out to stop Green from climbing, which led to Green being trapped upside down while her legs were hooked to the ladder. They then tried helping Cargill climb the ladder before Flair neutralized them and began climbing the ladder. Flair and Cargill knocked down Stratton and Legend, who tried to join them on the ladders, before they knocked each other off the ladder. Green then recovered and climbed the ladder to retrieve the belt and win the interim title.

Next was a match from Raw, in which Danhausen and Dominik Mysterio in a Human Monies on a Pole match, where the first competitor to retrieve the money bag off the pole in a corner of the ring would win the match. Mysterio's Judgment Day stablemate JD McDonagh came out to stop Danhausen from retrieving the money bag. Three Minihausens appeared to attack McDonagh and Mysterio. Danhausen went for the bag again, but McDonagh stopped him. Joe Hendry appeared and slammed a guitar on McDonagh's back. As Mysterio went for the bag, Danhausen cursed him, which set off pyrotechnics from the ring post that caused Mysterio to fall off the ropes. Danhausen then retrieved the money bag to get the victory.

In the penultimate match, Penta defended Raw's WWE Intercontinental Championship against Chad Gable. Penta pulled Gable into the turnbuckles, which caused significant damage on Gable's injured shoulder. After performing a diving headbutt off the top rope, he attempted a pinfall but could not do a proper cover due to his damaged shoulder, which allowed Penta to kick out. Penta hit Gable with a "Mexican Destroyer", in which Penta flipped over to drive Gable's head down, on the ring apron for a near-fall. When Penta tried it again, Gable countered with an ankle lock, which forced Penta to tap out. Thus, Gable won the title via submission.

==== Main event ====
In the main event, Roman Reigns defended Raw's World Heavyweight Championship against Seth Rollins. They fought into the crowd, where Reigns suplexed Rollins onto a steel object, lifting Rollins over him before slamming Rollins down back-first. At ringside, Reigns powerbombed Rollins through the Spanish announce table, but Rollins responded by powerbombing Reigns through the English announce table; both men returned to the ring just before the ten-count. Reigns and Rollins later traded punches, which led to Rollins unintentionally knocking down the referee. Reigns hit the "Dirty Deeds", the signature move of their old Shield stablemate Dean Ambrose. Reigns then attempted to charge at Rollins, but Rollins evaded; thus, Reigns hit the referee instead. Rollins prepared to hit Reigns with a steel chair, but Reigns anticipated it and struck first instead. Rollins urged Reigns to hit him with the chair, but Reigns tossed it aside. Rollins later attempted the stomp on Reigns' head off the top rope, but Reigns evaded and connected with a spear, charging at Rollins before driving his shoulder into Rollins' midsection to force them to fall back into the mat. He went for another spear before making the cover to win the match and retain the title via pinfall. After the match, Reigns and Rollins showed respect to one another by doing their signature Shield fist bump as English commentator Michael Cole called it the "final chapter" of their rivalry.

== Reception ==
Jason Powell of Pro Wrestling Dot Net called the Night 1 main event "what it needed to be with Brock passing the torch to Oba", although "there wasn't much mystery regarding the outcome". Although the Hell in a Cell structure was not used much, "it was another feather in Oba's cap to end Brock's HIAC undefeated streak". For the Undisputed WWE Championship match, CM Punk's moonsault "was scary because it looked like Cody saw he was going to miss, moved closer, and Punk either came close or did land on Cody's head", but the match was "good" and "dramatic". Powell "wasn't expecting a clean finish in the first Punk vs. Cody match to begin with", and Orton's return was "logical", with Powell assuming that it could lead to another triple threat match in the future. The Women's World Championship match was a "strong opener" with the outside interference not playing a part in the finishing sequence, and the six-man tag team match was "meaningless", although "everyone worked hard". For the Night 2 main event, Powell called it "very good" with "big moves and big near falls", although Reigns and Rollins "never declared during the build that this would be their final match". Powell wondered where Rollins would go from that point "if this was a rebirth for the Rollins character". He concluded that Night 2 "was a lot more fun than it appeared on paper".

Shakiel Mahjouri of CBS Sports gave the main event an A+, calling it a "suitable potential exit for Lesnar", who "was nearly infallible in a showcase against his spitting image", and a "fitting conclusion to the Femi–Lesnar trilogy". The Undisputed WWE Championship match was given a grade of A−, with Mahjouri calling it a "classic world title match involving world-class talent with a slow-burn start building to an exciting climax", with Orton's return "accomplished several things". The Women's World Championship match received a grade of A−, as Liv Morgan and Iyo Sky "showed up and delivered a great match", although Morgan got a "clean win after absorbing so much punishment". Mahjouri gave the fatal four-way match a grade of B+, calling it "far too short considering the quantity and quality of talent involved" but considered Kevin Owens's return "fantastic", with a feud between him and CM Punk "the freshest and most interesting option". Mahjouri panned the Human Monies on a Pole match, grading it a D, calling it "an uninspired cash grab" with "no real surprises or inventive twists". The Night 2 main event received a grade of A+, with Mahjouri calling it "a fantastic piece of storytelling" with the result providing "closure to their past issues", making it a "masterclass in professional wrestling, especially in-ring storytelling", and the best match of the event which Mahjouri considered "a mixed bag in some ways".

For Night 1, professional wrestling journalist Dave Meltzer of Wrestling Observer Newsletter rated the opening Women's World Championship match 4.25 stars, the six-man tag team match 3.5 stars, Gunther vs. Nick Aldis 3.5 stars, the six-woman tag team match 1.5 stars, the Undisputed WWE Championship match 4.25 stars, and the Hell in a Cell match between Oba Femi and Brock Lesnar 3.5 stars. For Night 2, he rated the Undisputed WWE Championship number one contender fatal four-way match 3.5 stars, the United States Championship match 1.75 stars, the interim WWE Women's Championship ladder match 2.25 stars, the Human Monies on a Pole match 0.5 stars (the lowest rated match across both nights), the Intercontinental Championship match 4.25 stars, and the World Heavyweight Championship main event between Roman Reigns and Seth Rollins 4.75 stars, the highest rated match of the event.

== Aftermath ==
During Night 1's post-show, Nick Aldis handed WWE Chief Content Officer (CCO) Paul "Triple H" Levesque his letter of resignation; however, Levesque tore up the letter and reinstated Aldis as SmackDown's general manager. Later during the post-show, Triple H announced that Brie Bella had suffered a legitimate shoulder injury.

On the Monday after SummerSlam, Brock Lesnar was moved to the alumni section on WWE's website, and then on The Pat McAfee Show the next day, Lesnar confirmed that he was retired, thus making SummerSlam his retirement match.

This would be the last SummerSlam to air on Abema in Japan as the rights to all WWE programming ended on September 30 and were transferred over to Netflix on October 1.

=== Raw ===
World Heavyweight Champion Roman Reigns opened the following episode of Raw, but was interrupted by LA Knight, who wanted a match for the title, but Reigns said he did not deserve one. Later, Reigns was upset with Bloodline members Jacob Fatu, Jey Uso, and Jimmy Uso after their loss at SummerSlam, and warned them to not touch Knight, as he would handle Knight, and to finally bring Solo Sikoa back to The Bloodline. Later that night, Fatu defeated Royce Keys in a street fight and continued attacking him after the match as Reigns approved of Fatu's actions.

As Roman Reigns made his way backstage, he talked to AAA General Manager Rey Mysterio and shook hands with one another in respect. Days later, Mysterio would announce a tournament featuring luchadores from Raw, SmackDown, and AAA for the right to challenge Reigns for the World Heavyweight Championship on the September 14 episode of Raw, which aired live from Mexico City.

Penta congratulated Chad Gable for his WWE Intercontinental Championship win when they were interrupted by The Judgment Day (Dominik Mysterio and JD McDonagh). This led to a tag team match where Penta and Gable defeated The Judgment Day.

Women's World Champion Liv Morgan celebrated her victory with the rest of The Judgment Day (Roxanne Perez and WWE Women's Intercontinental Champion Raquel Rodriguez). After interrupting a match between Perez and Sol Ruca and attack Ruca, Morgan was confronted by a returning Becky Lynch, who wanted a shot at the Women's World Championship, turning face in the process, followed by a returning Stephanie Vaquer, who attacked Morgan in the ring and had a staredown with Lynch, also signaling her intentions for the title.

=== SmackDown ===
Cody Rhodes began the following episode of SmackDown to talk about his loss and reignite his rivalry with Randy Orton, with Undisputed WWE Champion CM Punk denying anything of having to do with Orton's return. As Rhodes was making his way backstage, he was confronted by number one contender Kevin Owens, who subsequently traded barbs with Punk. It culminated with Owens challenging Punk for the title on the August 21 episode while stating that his return prevented Sami Zayn's plans to regain the title. Later, Orton and Rhodes agreed to settle their rivalry on any given night. Also, Punk told Zayn that he would have to go to the back of the line to earn another title shot. The match between Orton and Rhodes was eventually scheduled for Sunday Night's Main Event.

On the same episode of SmackDown, Baron Corbin retained the WWE United States Championship against Trick Williams in a rematch. Williams would regain the title from Corbin at Sunday Night's Main Event.

On September 11, WWE retroactively ended Rhea Ripley's WWE Women's Championship reign while officially recognizing Chelsea Green as the lineal champion, with SummerSlam Night 2 on August 2 recognized as the official changeover.

== Results ==
Night 1 (August 1)
No.	Results	Stipulations	Times
1	Liv Morgan (c) defeated Iyo Sky by pinfall	Singles match for the Women's World Championship	13:35
2	LA Knight, Solo Sikoa, and Royce Keys defeated The Bloodline (Jacob Fatu, Jey Uso, and Jimmy Uso) by pinfall	Six-man tag team match	11:00
3	Gunther defeated Nick Aldis by submission	Singles match	11:40
4	Fatal Influence (Jacy Jayne, Fallon Henley, and Lainey Reid) defeated The Bella Twins (Nikki Bella and Brie Bella) and Paige by pinfall	Six-woman tag team match	7:30
5	CM Punk (c) defeated Cody Rhodes by pinfall	Singles match for the Undisputed WWE Championship	30:10
6	Oba Femi defeated Brock Lesnar (with Paul Heyman) by pinfall	Hell in a Cell match This was Lesnar's retirement match.	11:40
(c) / – the champion(s) heading into the match

Night 2 (August 2)
No.	Results	Stipulations	Times
1	Kevin Owens defeated Finn Bálor, Gunther, and Sami Zayn by pinfall	Fatal four-way match to determine the #1 contender for the Undisputed WWE Championship (Note: This was originally scheduled as a singles match between Bálor and Zayn to determine the #1 contender.)	8:30
2	Baron Corbin defeated Trick Williams (c) (with Lil Yachty) by pinfall	Singles match for the WWE United States Championship	9:05
3	Chelsea Green defeated Charlotte Flair, Jade Cargill, Lash Legend, and Tiffany Stratton by retrieving the championship belt	Five-way ladder match for the interim WWE Women's Championship	13:05
4	Danhausen defeated Dominik Mysterio by retrieving the sack of money	Human Monies on a Pole match	6:50
5	Chad Gable defeated Penta (c) by submission	Singles match for the WWE Intercontinental Championship	11:10
6	Roman Reigns (c) defeated Seth Rollins by pinfall	Singles match for the World Heavyweight Championship	33:25
(c) / – the champion(s) heading into the match

=== Interim WWE Women's Championship Tournament bracket ===
Qualifiers; SmackDown; July 17–31, 2026
Jacy Jayne	7:45
Tiffany Stratton	Pinfall
Jade Cargill	Disqualification
Nia Jax	1:00
Chelsea Green	Pinfall
Kiana James	3:30
Charlotte Flair	Disqualification
Nia Jax (Note: Nia Jax re-entered the tournament after Charlotte Flair interfered in her match against Jade Cargill.)	8:15
Giulia	2:00
Lash Legend	Pinfall

Championship match SummerSlam; August 2, 2026
Tiffany Stratton	—
Jade Cargill	—
Chelsea Green	Win
Charlotte Flair	13:05
Lash Legend	—

== See also ==
- Sports in Minnesota
