= Fatal Influence =

Professional wrestling stable

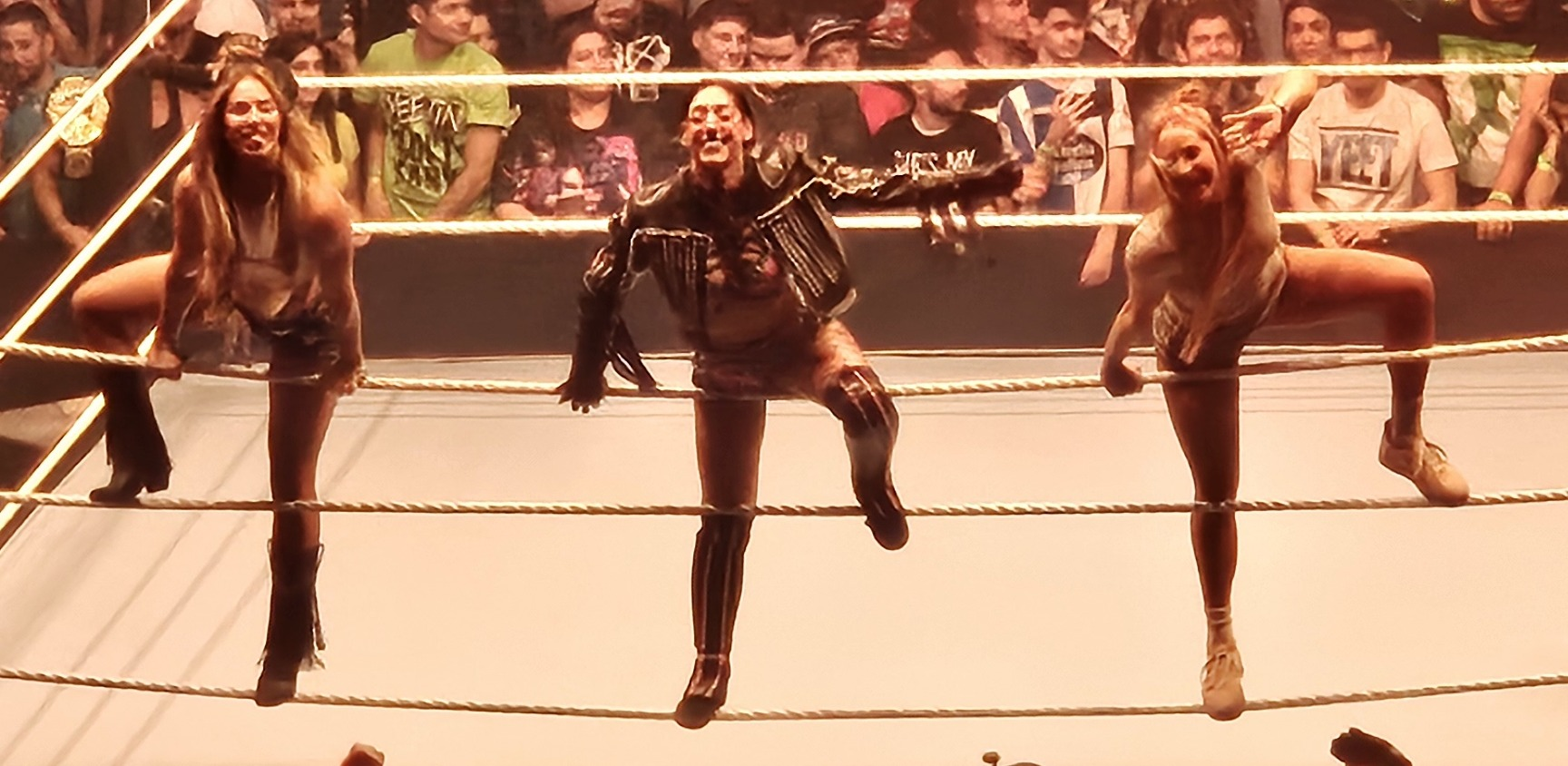
- Henley, Jayne and Reid in 2026

Stable
- Name: Fatal Influence
- Leader: Jacy Jayne
- Members: Fallon Henley; Lainey Reid
- Former members: Jazmyn Nyx
- Debut: July 9, 2024
- Years active: 2024–present

Fatal Influence is a villainous professional wrestling stable consisting of leader Jacy Jayne, Fallon Henley, and Lainey Reid. They are currently signed to WWE and perform on SmackDown brand where Jayne is the current WWE Women's United States Champion in her first reign.

Jayne is a former two-time NXT Women's Champion and a former one-time TNA Knockouts World Champion; she is also the first person to hold both championships simultaneously. Henley is a former one-time NXT Women's North American Champion and WWE Women's Speed Champion. Henley and Reid are one-time WWE Women's Tag Team Champions.

== Background ==
On the March 19, 2024, episode of NXT, Jacy Jayne and Jazmyn Nyx, members of the Chase University stable, turned on fellow Chase U member Riley Osborne, costing him his NXT Heritage Cup Championship match against No Quarter Catch Crew's Drew Gulak, turning both women heel in the process. On April 30 at Night 2 of Spring Breakin', long-time babyface Fallon Henley turned heel by attacking Chase U member Thea Hail following her match against Jayne. Following this, Jayne and Nyx attempted to forge an alliance with Henley.

== History ==
=== NXT (2024–2026) ===
On the July 9, 2024, episode of NXT, Jayne and Nyx formed an alliance with Henley, who took issue with wrestlers with no independent circuit background getting more opportunities in NXT (Nyx was given an exception despite having never competed in the independent circuit herself) and called themselves Fatal Influence the following month. The trio teamed up for the first time at Week 1 of NXT: The Great American Bash on July 30, where they defeated Karmen Petrovic, Lola Vice, and Sol Ruca in a six-woman tag team match. Beginning in September, Fatal Influence set their sights on the NXT Women's North American Championship held by Kelani Jordan. At NXT Halloween Havoc on October 27, Jordan faced Fatal Influence in a gauntlet match for the NXT Women's North American Championship. Henley defeated Jordan to win the title as the third person in the gauntlet (with Nyx and Jayne as the first and second persons in the gauntlet), winning her first singles championship in her wrestling career. Fatal Influence would soon after begin feuding with Shotzi, Tatum Paxley, and Jayne's former tag team partner Gigi Dolin, with the two teams facing each other at NXT: New Year's Evil in a six-woman tag team match with Fatal Influence coming out on the losing end. At NXT Vengeance Day on February 15, 2025, Henley lost the NXT Women's North American Championship to Stephanie Vaquer, ending her reign at 111 days.

Over the next few months, there were signs of dissension within Fatal Influence, particularly between Henley and Jayne. On the May 27 episode of NXT, Jayne defeated Stephanie Vaquer to win the NXT Women's Championship, with Henley's assistance, and resolving any tension between both women. On July 20 at Slammiversary, Jayne defeated Total Nonstop Action Wrestling's (TNA) Masha Slamovich in a Winner Takes All match to retain her NXT Women's Championship and also become the new TNA Knockouts World Champion, becoming a double champion and the first wrestler and the first woman to hold championships in both WWE and TNA simultaneously. At NXT Heatwave on August 24, Jayne lost the TNA Knockouts World Championship to Ash by Elegance in a triple threat match also involving Slamovich, whom Ash pinned, after interference from The Elegance Brand, ending her reign at 35 days. Following this, Nyx was singled out by Jayne as the weakest member of the stable, as Fatal Influence would go on a losing streak, Henley & Jayne would blame her for every loss including Heatwave. On the September 23 episode of NXT, Nyx was found attacked backstage. This led to her expulsion from Fatal Influence after she was abandoned by Henley and Jayne. A day later, Nyx announced that she would not sign a new WWE contract due to injuries suffered during her time there and being unhappy with the new contract offered. At NXT No Mercy on September 27, Jayne successfully defended the NXT Women's Championship from Lola Vice after assistance from a hooded individual later revealed to be Lainey Reid, who was listed as injured and did not compete in her match against Sol Ruca for Women's Speed Championship at the event. Reid also revealed she attacked Nyx, believing her to be dead weight to the group. On the October 14 episode of NXT, Reid officially joined the group. At NXT Halloween Havoc on October 25, Jayne lost the NXT Women's Championship to Tatum Paxley, ending her reign at 151 days.

On the November 4 episode of NXT, the new trio defeated Lola Vice and The Culling's Izzi Dame and Paxley in a six-woman tag team match in their first match as a team. At Gold Rush, Jayne regained the title against Paxley after Dame attacked Paxley, and the following week Henley won the Women's Speed Championship in the Speed Tournament finals against Zaria. On January 31, 2026 at Royal Rumble, Jayne made her women's Royal Rumble match debut as the 24th entrant. On the March 17 episode of NXT, Henley would sacrifice herself during a triple threat with Jayne, Ruca, & Zaria, to help Jayne win, but ultimately leaving herself vulnerable for her Speed title defense later that night, where she would lose the title to Wren Sinclair ending her reign at 112 days. At NXT Stand & Deliver, Jayne lost the title to Vice in a triple threat match also involving Kendal Grey, ending her second reign at 137 days. At Night 1 of NXT: Revenge on April 14, Jayne failed to regain the title from Vice despite assistance from her fellow stablemates which would be her final match and Fatal Influence's final appearance at NXT.

=== SmackDown (2026–present) ===
On the April 24, 2026 episode of SmackDown, Fatal Influence officially moved to the SmackDown brand, interrupting a title match between Alexa Bliss and Charlotte Flair against WWE Women's Tag Team Champions Brie Bella and Paige. Later that night, Jayne lost to WWE Women's Champion Rhea Ripley by disqualification after Henley and Reid attacked Ripley during the match. On the July 18 edition of Saturday Night's Main Event, Henley and Reid defeated Paige and Brie Bella to win the WWE Women's Tag Team Championships for the first time. At Night 1 of SummerSlam on August 1, Fatal Influence defeated the team of The Bella Twins (Brie Bella and Nikki Bella) and Paige in a six-woman tag team match. On the August 7 episode of SmackDown, Henley and Reid successfully defended their titles against Women's United States Champion Tiffany Stratton and Interim WWE Women's Champion Chelsea Green. On the following week on SmackDown on August 14, Jayne defeated Stratton to win the Women's United States Championship, marking her first main roster title. At World's Collide: Chicago on September 26, Reid and Henley defeated the AAA tag team, Las Tóxicas (Flammer and La Hiedra) in a tag team match, at their first World's Collide event. On the October 9 episode of SmackDown, Henley and Reid lost the WWE Women's Tag Team Championship to Alexa Bliss and Tatum Paxley, ending their reign at 83 days. In November, Fatal Influence allied with Jade Cargill and Michin (with B-Fab) as they face Flair, Bliss, Paxley, Bayley, and Stephanie Vaquer in a WarGames match at Survivor Series: WarGames on November 28. This will be Jayne's second and Henley's and Reid's first WarGames match.

== Members ==
*	Founding member(s)
L	Leader

=== Current ===
Members	Joined
Jacy Jayne (L)	July 9, 2024 *
Fallon Henley	July 9, 2024 *
Lainey Reid	October 14, 2025

=== Former ===
Member	Joined	Left
Jazmyn Nyx	July 9, 2024 *	September 23, 2025

== Championships and accomplishments ==
- Total Nonstop Action Wrestling
  - TNA Knockouts World Championship (1 time) – Jayne
- WWE
  - WWE Women's United States Championship (1 time, current) – Jayne
  - NXT Women's Championship (2 times) – Jayne
  - NXT Women's North American Championship (1 time) – Henley
  - WWE Women's Speed Championship (1 time) – Henley
  - WWE Women's Tag Team Championship (1 time) – Henley and Reid
  - WWE Women's Speed Championship Tournament (2025) – Henley
