= Lainey Reid =

American professional wrestler (born 1998)

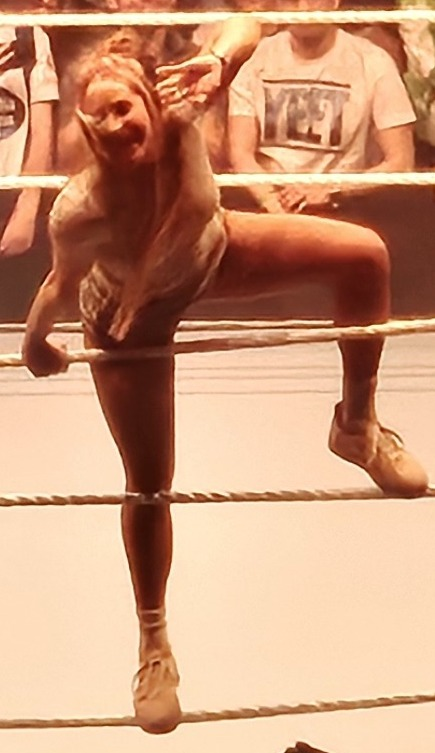
- Reid in 2026

Personal information
- Born: Tylynn Register; October 2, 1998 (age 28) Gadsden, Alabama, U.S.

Professional wrestling career
- Ring name(s): Tylynn Register; Lainey Reid
- Billed height: 5 ft 6 in (168 cm)
- Billed weight: 134 lb (61 kg)
- Billed from: Gadsden, Alabama
- Trained by: Sara Amato; WWE Performance Center
- Debut: November 11, 2023

Tylynn Register (born October 2, 1998) is an American professional wrestler and former track and field athlete. She is currently signed to WWE, where she performs on the SmackDown brand under the ring name Lainey Reid and is a member of the Fatal Influence stable. She is a former one-time WWE Women's Tag Team Champion.

== Early life ==
Tylynn Register was born on October 2, 1998, in Gadsden, Alabama, United States. Register attended Hokes Bluff High School, where she was a three-time track and field state champion in 100 metres hurdles, 300 metres hurdles, and triple jump. She was also a four-time Etowah County high school track meet Most Valuable Player (MVP). She attended Jacksonville State University (JSU), where she majored in Family and Consumer Science and continued competing in track and field events. She finished 1st in the 400 metres hurdles and 4 x 400 metre relay events at the 2019 Catamount Classic.

== Professional wrestling career ==
=== WWE (2023–present) ===
==== Early beginnings (2023–2025) ====
On June 1, 2023, WWE announced Register as a member of the WWE Performance Center's spring rookie class of 2023. On November 11, she teamed with Anna Keefer in her professional wrestling debut in a losing effort against Tatum Paxley and Izzi Dame at an NXT live event. On the March 22, 2024, episode of NXT Level Up, Register—now under the ring name Lainey Reid—made her televised in-ring debut, where she was defeated by Jaida Parker. Reid earned her first career televised win in a match against Layla Diggs on the October 18 episode of NXT Level Up.

On the June 3, 2025, episode of NXT, Reid made her NXT debut, interrupting NXT Women's Champion Jacy Jayne before she was interrupted by Lola Vice. On the following week's episode, Reid challenged Jayne for the NXT Women's Championship but ultimately failed after a distraction by Jayne's Fatal Influence stablemate Fallon Henley. On the September 9 episode of NXT, Reid defeated Faby Apache to advance to the finals of a #1 contender's tournament for the WWE Women's Speed Championship. She won the tournament by defeating Candice LeRae in the finals on the September 23 episode of NXT, but she was unable to challenge for the title at NXT No Mercy after suffering an injury during training. In that same episode, Jayne and Henley found their Fatal Influence stablemate Jazmyn Nyx knocked out backstage.

==== Fatal Influence (2025–present) ====
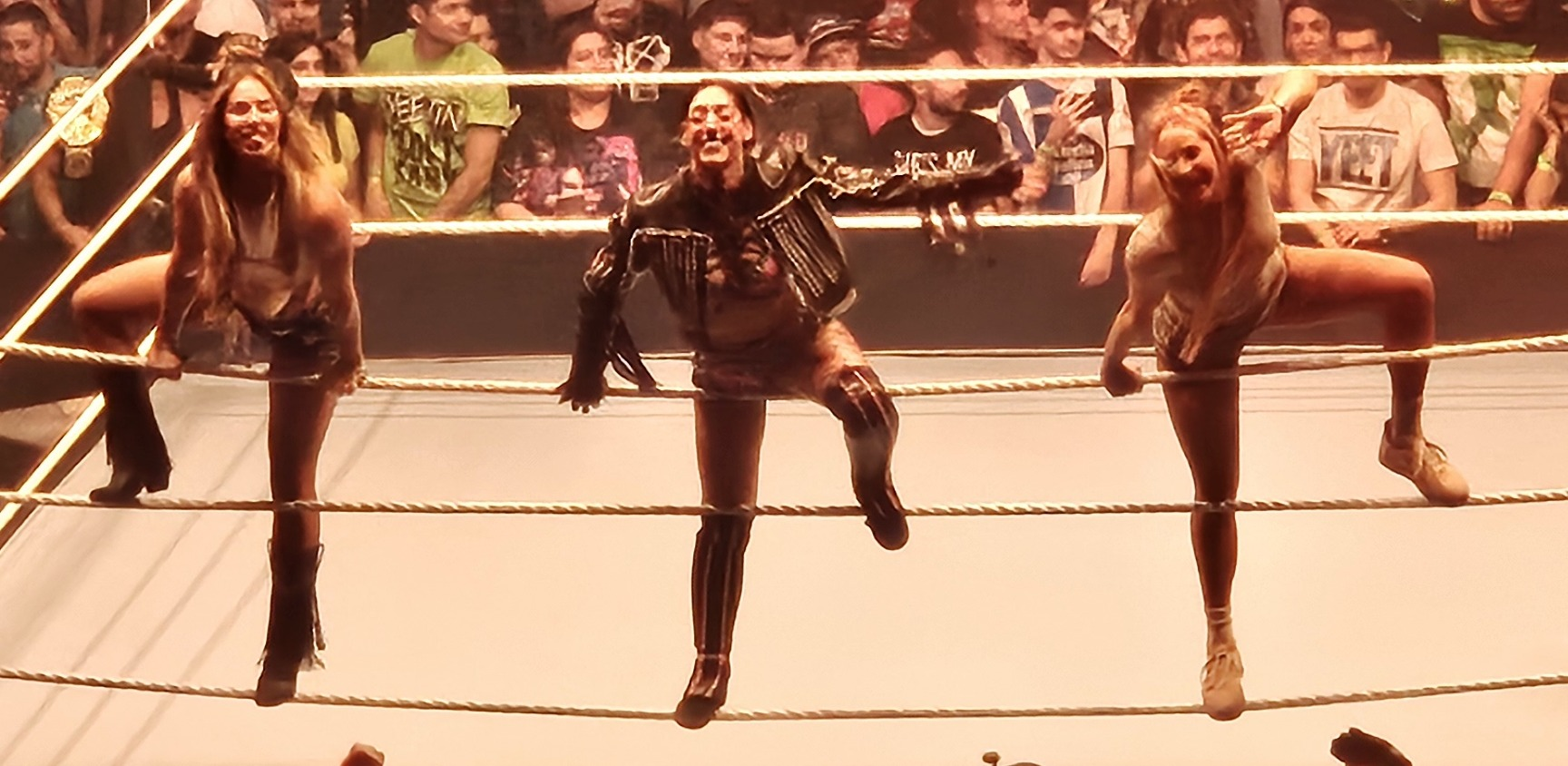
Reid (right) with Fallon Henley (left) and Jacy Jayne (center) as Fatal Influence

At NXT No Mercy on September 27, Reid appeared for an interview wearing an orthopedic boot. She stated her intent to challenge for the WWE Women's Speed Championship when she gets cleared to return to the ring. Vice gave Reid encouragement, but Reid ignored her. Later that night, Jayne retained the NXT Women's Championship against Vice after a masked assailant attacked Vice. On the September 30 episode of NXT, Reid revealed to Jayne and Henley that she was the masked assailant who helped Jayne at NXT No Mercy. She stated that she would do anything for Fatal Influence and admitted to attacking Nyx the previous week. Reid officially joined Fatal Influence on the October 14 episode of NXT. On the November 11 episode of NXT, WWE Evolve Women's Champion Kendal Grey was talking to her No Quarter Catch Crew stablemate Wren Sinclair backstage when she was approached by Reid, who proceeded to slap her as a brawl ensued between the two women. Later that night, it was announced that Grey would defend the title against Reid at NXT: Gold Rush. At Week 2 of NXT: Gold Rush on November 25, Reid failed to defeat Grey for the title with Fatal Influence banned from ringside. On the January 20, 2026, episode of NXT, Reid and Henley competed in a triple threat tag team match to earn the right to challenge for the TNA Knockouts World Tag Team Championship, but it was won by Sol Ruca and Zaria.

On the April 24 episode of SmackDown, Reid alongside Fatal Influence, officially moved to the SmackDown brand, interrupting Brie Bella and Paige's WWE Women's Tag Team Championship defense against Alexa Bliss and Charlotte Flair. Fatal Influence defeated Bliss, Flair, and Rhea Ripley in a six-woman tag team match on the May 8 episode after an interference by Jade Cargill. At Saturday Night's Main Event on July 18, Reid and Henley defeated Brie Bella and Paige to win the WWE Women's Tag Team Championship, marking Reid's first title win in her career. Reid made her WWE Premium Live Event debut at SummerSlam Night 1 on August 1, competing as part of Fatal Influence in a six-woman tag team match against Paige and The Bella Twins (Nikki Bella and Brie Bella); Fatal Influence came out victorious. Reid fought alongside Henley in a tag team match against Las Tóxicas (La Hiedra, and Lady Flammer) at her first World's Collide event, ultimately coming out victorious. On the October 9 episode of SmackDown, Henley and Reid lost the WWE Women's Tag Team Championship to Alexa Bliss and Tatum Paxley, ending their reign at 83 days. In November, Fatal Influence allied with Cargill and Michin (with B-Fab) as they face Flair, Bliss, Paxley, Bayley, and Stephanie Vaquer in a WarGames match at Survivor Series: WarGames on November 28. This will be Reid's WarGames match debut.

== Championships and accomplishments ==
- WWE
  - WWE Women's Tag Team Championship (1 time) – with Fallon Henley
