= NXT Gold Rush (2023) =

WWE two-part television special

- Promotion: WWE
- Brand: NXT
- Date: June 20 and 27, 2023
- City: Orlando, Florida
- Venue: WWE Performance Center

NXT special episodes chronology
← Previous; Spring Breakin'	Next → Heatwave

Gold Rush chronology
← Previous; First	Next → 2025

The 2023 Gold Rush was a professional wrestling television special produced by WWE. It was the inaugural Gold Rush and was held primarily for wrestlers from the NXT brand division. The event aired as a two-part special episode of NXT on the USA Network, taking place live on June 20 and 27, 2023, at the WWE Performance Center in Orlando, Florida.

== Production ==
=== Background ===
NXT is the primary weekly professional wrestling television program for WWE's developmental brand, NXT. On the June 13, 2023, episode of NXT, WWE executive Shawn Michaels announced that the June 20 and 27 episodes would be a two-part special titled Gold Rush, themed around NXT's championships. The television special was held at NXT's home base, the WWE Performance Center in Orlando, Florida, and aired on the USA Network.

=== Storylines ===
The card included matches that resulted from scripted storylines, where wrestlers portrayed heroes, villains, or less distinguishable characters in scripted events that built tension and culminated in a wrestling match or series of matches. Results were predetermined by WWE's writers on the NXT brand, while storylines were produced on WWE's weekly television program, NXT, and the supplementary online streaming show, Level Up.

On the June 6 episode of NXT, Bron Breakker challenged Raw's Seth "Freakin" Rollins for the World Heavyweight Championship. The following week, during Breakker's promo, Rollins appeared on the TitanTron to accept Breakker's challenge for his title during Week 1 of Gold Rush.

On the May 30 episode of NXT, after Carmelo Hayes retained his NXT Championship, Baron Corbin, who became a free agent in the 2023 WWE Draft, made his return to NXT and attacked Hayes. The following week, Ilja Dragunov interrupted Corbin's promo and challenged him to a match, which was made official for next week's episode. During that week's episode, WWE executive Shawn Michaels announced on Twitter that the winner of this match would face Hayes for the NXT Championship on Week 2 of Gold Rush. The match was won by Corbin.

On the June 6 episode of NXT, Thea Hail won a battle royal to become the number one contender for Tiffany Stratton's NXT Women's Championship. The following week, the match was scheduled for Week 2 of Gold Rush.

At Battleground, Wes Lee defeated Tyler Bate and Joe Gacy in a triple threat match to retain the NXT North American Championship. On the May 30 episode of NXT, during a tag team match between Lee and Bate against The Dyad (Rip Fowler and Jagger Reid), Mustafa Ali, who became a free agent in the 2023 WWE Draft, returned to NXT. Two weeks later, in a backstage segment where Lee, Bate, and Ali celebrated their win against The Schism, Ali proposed a match between Lee and Bate for the NXT North American Championship, where Ali would serve as the special guest referee. Lee and Bate agreed to Ali's idea, and the match was scheduled for Week 1 of Gold Rush.

On the June 6 episode of NXT, Dana Brooke and Cora Jade participated in the aforementioned battle royal, and they were the last two persons eliminated in the match. The following week, Jade interrupted Brooke's interview and blamed her for costing her the battle royal. After Brooke answered that she should not blame her, Jade slapped Brooke across the face. That same episode, Brooke distracted Jade during her match, causing her to lose. A match between Brooke and Jade was scheduled for Week 1 of Gold Rush.

On the June 13 episode of NXT, Malik Blade defeated his tag team partner Edris Enofé while Hank Walker, Tank Ledger, Brooks Jensen, and Josh Briggs watched at ringside. After the match, all six men entered the ring and Blade and Enofé hugged each other, and NXT commentator Booker T announced that the three tag teams would face each other in a triple threat tag team match during Week 1 of Gold Rush, with the winners facing Gallus (Mark Coffey and Wolfgang) for the NXT Tag Team Championship during Week 2.

== Aftermath ==
A second NXT Gold Rush was scheduled for November 2025, but this time as a crossover with WWE's Evolve brand, sister promotion Lucha Libre AAA Worldwide (AAA), and partner promotion Total Nonstop Action Wrestling (TNA). Like the original event, the 2025 event was themed around championship matches, including titles from Evolve, AAA, and TNA.

== Results ==
Week 1
No.	Results	Stipulations	Times
1	Wes Lee (c) defeated Tyler Bate by pinfall	Singles match for the NXT North American Championship with Mustafa Ali as the special guest referee.	12:59
2	Edris Enofé and Malik Blade defeated Brooks Jensen and Josh Briggs (with Fallon Henley) and Hank Walker and Tank Ledger by pinfall	Triple threat tag team match to determine the #1 contenders for the NXT Tag Team Championship	9:12
3	Cora Jade defeated Dana Brooke by referee stoppage	Singles match	10:46
4	The Meta-Four (Jakara Jackson and Lash Legend) (with Noam Dar and Oro Mensah) defeated Valentina Feroz and Yulisa León by pinfall	Tag team match	3:22
5	Seth "Freakin" Rollins (c) defeated Bron Breakker by pinfall	Singles match for the World Heavyweight Championship	17:06
(c) / – the champion(s) heading into the match

Week 2
No.	Results	Stipulations	Times
1	Tiffany Stratton (c) defeated Thea Hail (with Duke Hudson) by pinfall	Singles match for the NXT Women's Championship	9:08
2	Gallus (Mark Coffey and Wolfgang) (c) defeated Edris Enofé and Malik Blade by pinfall	Tag team match for the NXT Tag Team Championship	13:18
3	Nathan Frazer (c) (with Yulisa León) defeated Dragon Lee (with Valentina Feroz) 2-1	British Rounds Rules match for the NXT Heritage Cup	13:02
4	Gigi Dolin defeated Kiana James by pinfall	Singles match	9:04
5	Carmelo Hayes (c) (with Trick Williams) defeated Baron Corbin by pinfall	Singles match for the NXT Championship	16:32
(c) / – the champion(s) heading into the match
