= Saturday Night's Main Event XLV =

2026 professional wrestling event

- Promotional poster featuring Cody Rhodes, Gunther, CM Punk, and Sami Zayn
- Promotion: WWE
- Brand(s): Raw; SmackDown
- Date: July 18, 2026
- City: Manhattan, New York
- Venue: Madison Square Garden
- Attendance: 15,361

WWE event chronology
← Previous; NXT The Great American Bash	Next → SummerSlam

Saturday Night's Main Event chronology
← Previous; XLIV	Next → Sunday Night's Main Event

Saturday Night's Main Event XLV, also promoted as Saturday Night's Main Event: NYC and Saturday Night's Main Event at MSG, was a 2026 professional wrestling television special produced by WWE, held for wrestlers from the promotion's main roster brands, Raw and SmackDown. It was the 45th edition of the periodic Saturday Night's Main Event series and was livestreamed exclusively on Peacock in the United States and YouTube internationally. The event took place on July 18, 2026, from Madison Square Garden (MSG) in the New York City borough of Manhattan, New York.

This was the first Saturday Night's Main Event at MSG since August 2007 and was held as part of Fanatics Fest. Indiana Pacers's Tyrese Haliburton and 2026 NBA Champion New York Knicks's Jalen Brunson and Karl-Anthony Towns made appearances at the event, with Towns becoming physically involved in Danhausen's No disqualification match against JD McDonagh.

== Production ==
=== Background ===
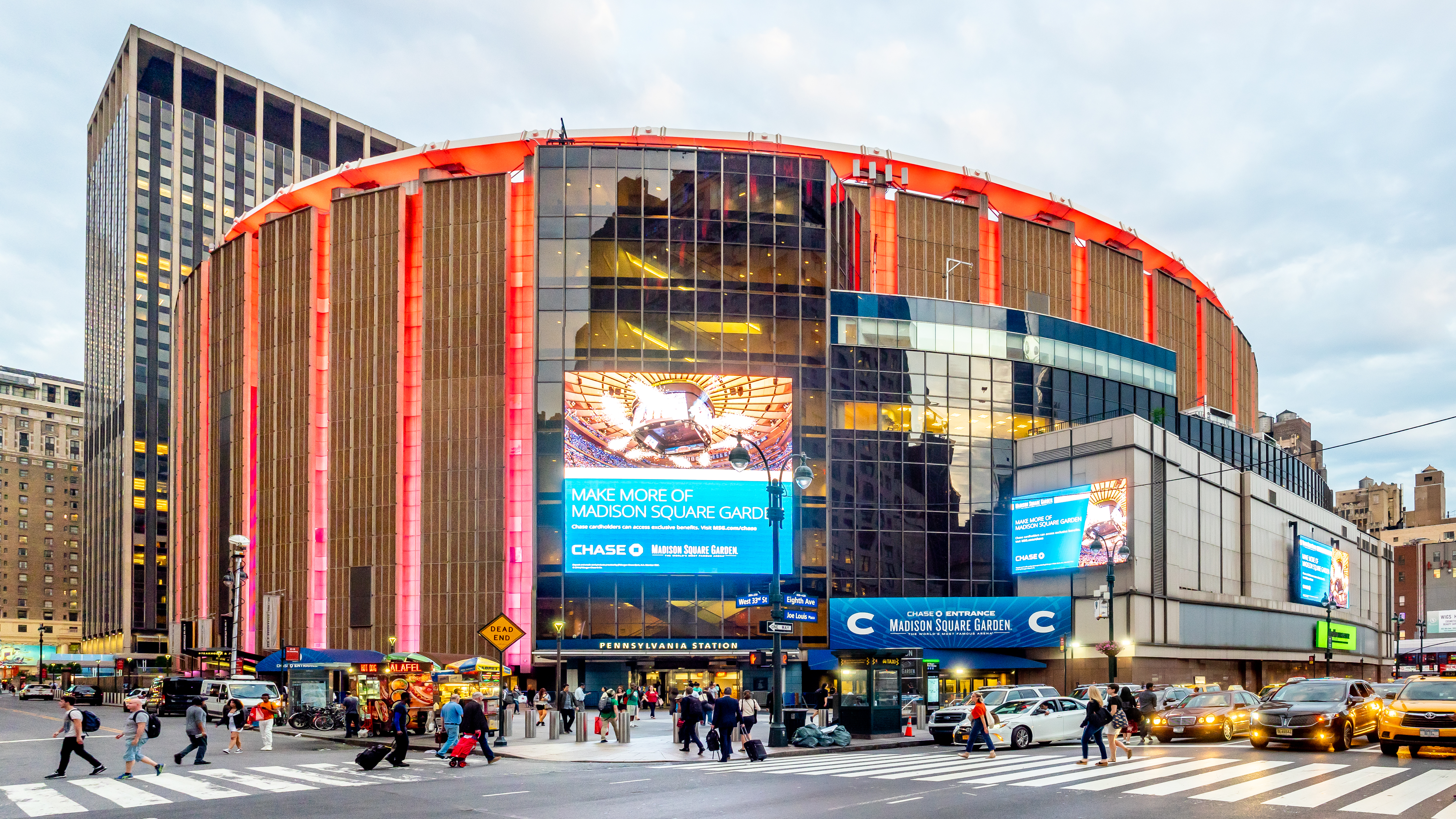
The 45th Saturday Night's Main Event was held at Madison Square Garden in the New York City borough of Manhattan, New York.

Saturday Night's Main Event is a series of American professional wrestling television specials produced by WWE via NBC. The series was originally broadcast from 1985 to 1992, with the 1992 events produced by Fox, and were briefly held again from 2006 to 2008 by NBC. In December 2024, as part of NBC's acquisition of rights to air Friday Night SmackDown on the USA Network in the United States, Saturday Night's Main Event was also reinstated to be simulcast on USA and NBC's streaming service Peacock in the United States, with WWE's YouTube channel streaming the program internationally. However, in August 2025 after Peacock lost the rights to WWE's main roster premium live events (PLE) in the United States to ESPN, Saturday Night's Main Event moved exclusively to Peacock in the US under a multi-year deal beginning in November 2025.

On March 31, 2026, WWE announced that the 45th Saturday Night's Main Event, known as Saturday Night's Main Event XLV, would return the show to Madison Square Garden (MSG) in the New York City borough of Manhattan, New York on July 18, 2026. This was the first Saturday Night's Main Event at MSG since August 2007 and it was held as part of Fanatics Fest. The event was also promoted as Saturday Night's Main Event: NYC and Saturday Night's Main Event at MSG and featured wrestlers from the Raw and SmackDown brands.

=== Storylines ===
The event included five matches that resulted from scripted storylines. Results were predetermined by WWE's writers on the Raw and SmackDown brands, while storylines were produced on WWE's weekly television shows, Monday Night Raw and Friday Night SmackDown.

== Results ==
No.	Results	Stipulations	Times
1^{P}	Trick Williams defeated Laredo Kid by pinfall	Singles match	7:15
2	Fatal Influence (Lainey Reid and Fallon Henley) (with Jacy Jayne) defeated Paige and Brie Bella (c) by pinfall	Tag team match for the WWE Women's Tag Team Championship	7:15
3	Danhausen defeated JD McDonagh (with Dominik Mysterio) by pinfall	No Disqualification match	11:35
4	Lyra Valkyria defeated Bayley by technical submission	Singles match	10:30
5	CM Punk and Cody Rhodes defeated Gunther and Sami Zayn by pinfall	Tag team match Had Gunther and Zayn won, they would have been added to the Undisputed WWE Championship match between Punk and Rhodes at SummerSlam.	14:08
(c) / – the champion(s) heading into the match; P / – the match was broadcast on the pre-show
