= NXT Gold Rush (2025) =

Two-part professional wrestling television special

NXT: Gold Rush
- Promotional poster featuring various NXT wrestlers
- Promotion(s): WWE; Total Nonstop Action Wrestling; Lucha Libre AAA Worldwide
- Brand(s): NXT; Evolve
- Date: November 18, 2025; November 25, 2025
- City: New York City, New York
- Venue: The Theater at Madison Square Garden

NXT special episodes chronology
← Previous; NXT vs. TNA Showdown	Next → New Year's Evil

Gold Rush chronology
← Previous; 2023	Next → —

The 2025 Gold Rush, also promoted as Gold Rush: New York, was a two-part professional wrestling television special co-produced by WWE, Total Nonstop Action Wrestling (TNA), and Lucha Libre AAA Worldwide (AAA) for wrestlers from WWE's NXT and Evolve brand divisions, TNA, and AAA. This was the second Gold Rush event and the first since 2023. It took place at The Theater at Madison Square Garden in New York City, New York on November 18, 2025. It aired as special episodes of NXT on The CW with the first part airing live and the second part airing on tape delay on November 25.

Similar to the inaugural 2023 event, the event was themed around championships. While the 2023 event mainly focused on NXT's championships, the 2025 event additionally featured championship matches from WWE's developmental brand Evolve, partner promotion TNA, and sister promotion AAA. The event featured Trick Williams's final NXT appearance before getting called up to WWE's main roster.

== Production ==
=== Background ===
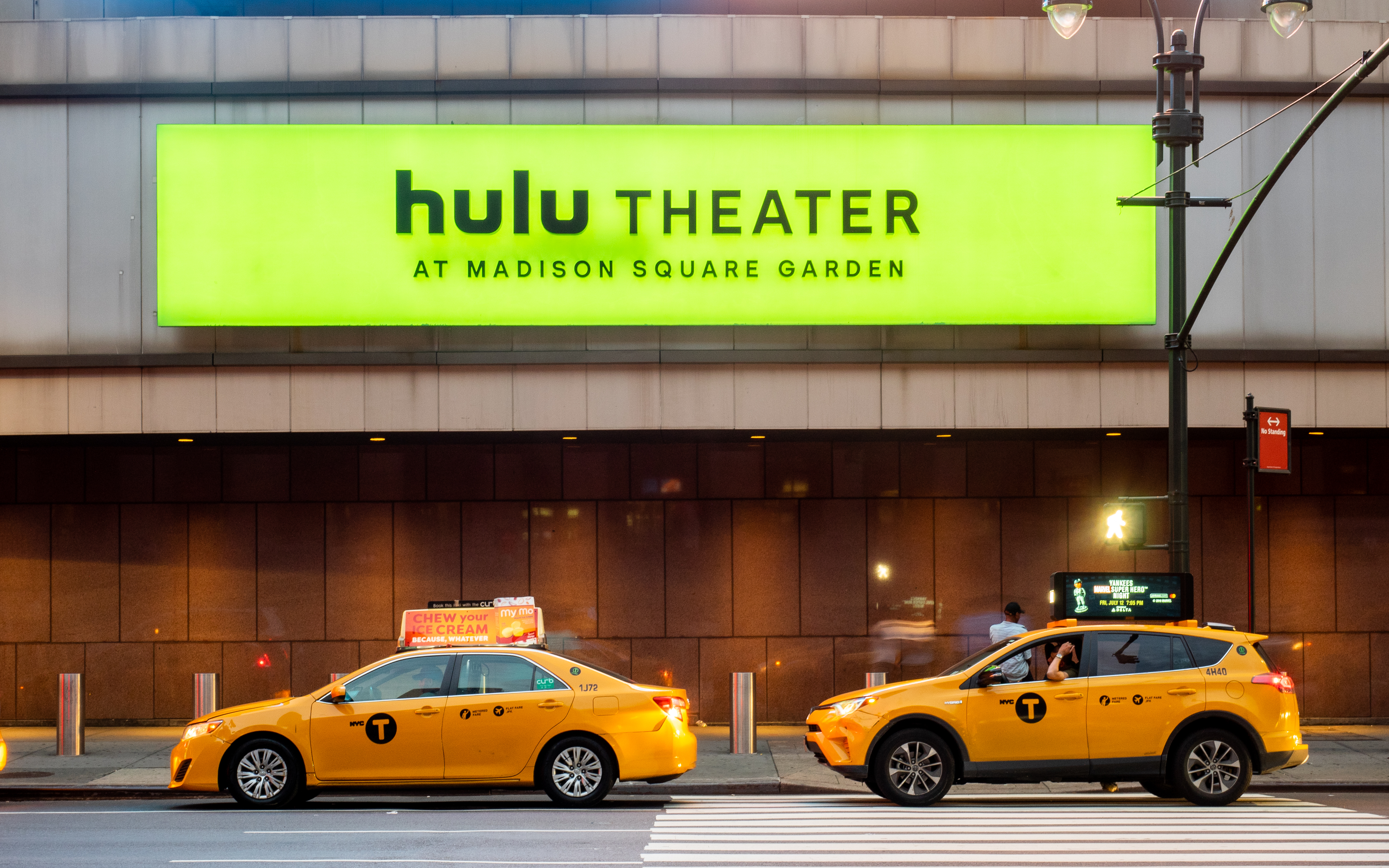
The second Gold Rush took place at The Theatre at Madison Square Garden in New York City, New York.

In June 2023, the American professional wrestling promotion WWE produced a two-part television special for its developmental brand NXT titled Gold Rush, which aired as special episodes of NXT on the USA Network. The event was mainly themed around championship matches. On October 25, 2025, during NXT Halloween Havoc, WWE announced a second Gold Rush special of NXT, now on The CW. The event was held at The Theater at Madison Square Garden in New York City, New York on November 18, 2025, with the first part airing live and the second part airing on tape delay on November 25. The event was also a crossover with WWE's Evolve brand, sister promotion Lucha Libre AAA Worldwide (AAA), and partner promotion Total Nonstop Action Wrestling (TNA). Like the original event, the 2025 event was themed around championship matches, including titles from Evolve, AAA, and TNA.

=== Storylines ===
The event included matches that resulted from scripted storylines. Results were predetermined by the writers of the participating promotions, while storylines were produced on WWE's weekly television programs, NXT and Evolve, TNA's weekly television program, Impact!, and AAA events.

At NXT Halloween Havoc, Sol Ruca was scheduled to defend her NXT Women's North American Championship against Blake Monroe, however, after suffering an injury, Ruca was not medically cleared to compete. Ruca's tag team partner Zaria then offered to defend the title on Ruca's behalf, which Ruca and NXT General Manager Ava agreed. There, Monroe defeated Zaria to win the title. Three nights later on NXT, Monroe announced that she would make her first title defense at Gold Rush. The following week, Ruca stated that she wanted a rematch for the title, however, Ava stated that if Ruca was medically cleared, she would get the rematch against Monroe at Gold Rush. Ruca was subsequently cleared on the following episode, and the match was made official.

On the October 28 episode of NXT, Sol Ruca relinquished the WWE Women's Speed Championship due to injury, and a tournament was announced to determine the new champion. The following week, it was announced that the finals would take place at Gold Rush.

At TNA Victory Road on September 26, Kelani Jordan defeated TNA's Léi Yǐng Lee (who previously wrestled in WWE as Xia Li) to win the vacant TNA Knockouts World Championship. After that, Jordan took part on the 4-on-4 women's Survivor Series style elimination match at NXT vs. TNA Showdown as team captain for Team TNA against Team NXT, where Jordynne Grace was the special guest referee, which was won by Team NXT after pinning Jordan. After that, Jordan took issue with Grace because she was the referee, and mistreated Grace, even after she gave advice and tried to help Jordan, since the NXT roster considered Jordan a traitor for being on Team TNA, and Grace knew what it was like to be mistreated, since she had also been the TNA Knockouts World Champion before and was also mistreated during her appearances in NXT. On the October 28 episode of NXT, Jordan defeated Grace to retain the title after striking her with the championship belt while the referee was distracted, turning Jordan heel in the process. Lee then voiced her displeasure with Jordan in a video on X, stating that Jordan brought shame to the title and vowed to take it from her. On the November 4 episode, Jordan stated that she would not defend her title at Gold Rush, however, TNA Director of Authority Santino Marella announced that Jordan would defend the title against both Grace and Lee in a triple threat match at Gold Rush.

On the October 28 episode of NXT, SmackDown's Chelsea Green and NXT North American Champion Ethan Page discussed their upcoming match for the AAA World Mixed Tag Team Championship at AAA Alianzas on November 2, where Thea Hail passed and called out Joe Hendry (then signed to TNA), who appeared and stated that Green and Page should worry about winning the title before talking about it, with both Green and Page stating that they didn't care. Green and Page subsequently won the title at the event. Two nights later on NXT, Green and Page celebrated their victory, but Hendry interrupted. Page asked if Hendry wanted a shot at the NXT North American Championship at Gold Rush, which Hendry declined, and announced he wanted a shot at the AAA World Mixed Tag Team Championship. After Green and Page stated that Hendry needed a partner, Hendry subsequently introduced Hail as his tag team partner for the event. The match was subsequently made official.

At Halloween Havoc on October 25, The Culling's Tatum Paxley defeated Jacy Jayne to win the NXT Women's Championship. Three nights later on NXT, Fatal Influence (Jayne, Fallon Henley, and Lainey Reid) attacked Paxley during her title defense. The following week, Fatal Influence defeated Paxley and Culling's Izzi Dame in a six-woman tag team match, with Jayne pinning Dame. The following week, Jayne challenged Paxley to prove that her victory at Halloween Havoc was not a fluke by giving her a rematch, with Paxley agreed under the stipulation that if Jayne loses, she would never be able to challenge Paxley for the title again as long as she held it. The match was subsequently made official.

On the June 4 episode of Evolve, Jackson Drake won a fatal four-way elimination match to win the inaugural WWE Evolve Championship by last eliminating Sean Legacy. Over the next few months, Drake and his Vanity Project stablemates Swipe Right (Brad Baylor and Ricky Smokes) continued to feud with Legacy. On the November 11 episode of NXT, it was announced that Drake would defend the title against Legacy at Gold Rush.

At TNA Bound for Glory on October 12, TNA's Leon Slater defended the TNA X-Division Championship against Je'Von Evans, but the match ended in a no contest after both men were attacked by DarkState (Cutler James, Saquon Shugars. and NXT Tag Team Champions Dion Lennox and Osiris Griffin). Their rivalry continued, and Evans defeated Shugars on the November 4 episode of NXT. On the following week, Evans revealed that after speaking with NXT General Manager Ava and TNA Director of Authority Santino Marella, that he and Slater would challenge Lennox and Griffin for the NXT Tag Team Championship at Gold Rush.

On the November 11 episode of NXT, WWE Evolve Women's Champion Kendal Grey was talking to No Quarter Catch Crew stablemate Wren Sinclair backstage when she was approached by Lainey Reid, who proceeded to slap her as a brawl ensued between the two women. Later that night, it was announced that Grey would defend the title against Reid at Gold Rush.

== Results ==
Week 1 (aired live November 18)
No.	Results	Stipulations	Times
1	Ethan Page and Chelsea Green (c) (with Alba Fyre) defeated Joe Hendry and Thea Hail by pinfall	Mixed tag team match for the AAA World Mixed Tag Team Championship	10:41
2	Blake Monroe (c) defeated Sol Ruca (with Zaria) by technical knockout (Note: Zaria threw in the towel on behalf of Sol Ruca.)	Singles match for the NXT Women's North American Championship	13:20
3	DarkState (Dion Lennox and Osiris Griffin) (c) (with Cutler James and Saquon Shugars) defeated Je'Von Evans and Leon Slater by pinfall	Tag team match for the NXT Tag Team Championship	11:08
4	Jacy Jayne (with Fallon Henley and Lainey Reid) defeated Tatum Paxley (c) (with Shawn Spears, Niko Vance, and Izzi Dame) by pinfall	Last Chance match for the NXT Women's Championship; Had Jayne lost, she would've never been able to challenge for the title again for as long as Paxley remained champion.	11:28
(c) / – the champion(s) heading into the match

Week 2 (taped November 18, aired on tape delay November 25)
No.	Results	Stipulations	Times
1	Jackson Drake (c) (with Brad Baylor and Ricky Smokes) defeated Sean Legacy by pinfall	Singles match for the WWE Evolve Championship	7:55
2	Fallon Henley (with Jacy Jayne and Lainey Reid) defeated Zaria by pinfall in sudden death overtime	Tournament final for the vacant WWE Women's Speed Championship	8:02
3	Léi Yǐng Lee defeated Kelani Jordan (c) and Jordynne Grace by pinfall	Triple threat match for the TNA Knockouts World Championship	9:33
4	Kendal Grey (c) (with Wren Sinclair) defeated Lainey Reid by pinfall	Singles match for the WWE Evolve Women's Championship; Fatal Influence (Jacy Jayne and Fallon Henley) were banned from ringside.	6:58
5	Myles Borne defeated Trick Williams by pinfall	Men's Iron Survivor Challenge qualifying match	8:28
(c) / – the champion(s) heading into the match

=== WWE Women's Speed Championship Tournament ===
1st Round; NXT; November 4–11, 2025
Zaria	Pinfall
Wren Sinclair	2:31
Fallon Henley	Pinfall
Skylar Raye	2:14

Final; NXT Gold Rush: Week 2 November 18, 2025 (Aired: November 25)
Zaria	8:02 (Note: NXT General Manager Ava Raine reset the match to a normal match after the allotted 5 minutes.)
Fallon Henley	Pinfall
