= Thea Hail =

American professional wrestler (born 2003)

Personal information
- Born: Madison Knisley; September 9, 2003 (age 23) Pittsburgh, Pennsylvania, U.S.

Professional wrestling career
- Ring name(s): Nikita Knight; Thea Hail
- Billed height: 5 ft 2 in (157 cm)
- Billed from: Pittsburgh, Pennsylvania
- Trained by: Brandon K. WWE Performance Center
- Debut: September 11, 2021

Madison Knisley (born September 9, 2003) is an American professional wrestler and former gymnast. As of March 2022, she is signed to WWE, where she performs on the NXT brand under the ring name Thea Hail where she is a former one-time NXT Women's North American Champion

== Early life ==
Madison Knisley was born on September 9, 2003 in Pittsburgh, Pennsylvania. She went to school at Pivik Elementary School, in Plum, Pennsylvania and practiced gymnastics at a gymkhana in Monroeville.

== Professional wrestling career ==
=== All Elite Wrestling (2021) ===
Knisley made her professional wrestling debut on the September 28, 2021 (taped on September 11, 2021) episode of AEW Dark, where she performed under the ring name Nikita Knight, losing to Thunder Rosa. She wrestled in another match on the October 24, 2021 episode of Dark, against Julia Hart, which she lost.

=== WWE ===
==== Chase University (2022–2024) ====
On March 17, 2022, Knisley was announced as one of the 14 recruits who reported to the WWE Performance Center in Orlando, Florida. One month later, she began to work under the ring name Thea Hail. She was assigned to NXT, where she became part of the Chase University stable. As part of the stable, they feuded with Schism (Joe Gacy, Ava, Jagger Reid, and Rip Fowler), winning an eight-person mixed tag team match at the 2023 NXT Stand & Deliver kickoff. Hail feuded with Tiffany Stratton for NXT Women's Championship at Week 2 of Gold Rush in a singles match and The Great American Bash in a submission match, but could not win the title. At Week 2 of NXT: Halloween Havoc on October 31, 2023, Hail and fellow Chase University member Jacy Jayne challenged WWE Women's Tag Team Champions Chelsea Green and Piper Niven for the titles though they were unsuccessful.

On the following week of NXT, Jayne and Jazmyn Nyx left Chase University. On the April 16 episode of NXT, Hail lost to Tatum Paxley after interference from Jayne and Nyx. Following this, a match was scheduled between Hail and Jayne for Week 2 of Spring Breakin', which Hail won. However, a dissatisfied Fallon Henley turned heel and attacked Hail as she was celebrating. On the May 21 episode of NXT, Henley defeated Hail to qualify for a spot for the six-woman ladder match to crown the inaugural NXT Women's North American Champion at NXT Battleground. On the November 19 episode of NXT, Ridge Holland, who had joined and defected Chase U, defeated Andre Chase with the future of Chase U on the line, causing the stable to disband.

==== Singles competition (2025–present) ====
After a five-month hiatus, Hail returned on the April 15, 2025, episode of NXT and defeated Karmen Petrovic to qualify for the six-woman ladder match for the vacant NXT Women’s North American Championship at NXT Stand & Deliver. At NXT Stand & Deliver on April 19, Hail failed to win the title. On the November 4 episode of NXT, Hail was revealed as Joe Hendry's mixed tag team partner as they challenged AAA World Mixed Tag Team Champions Chelsea Green and Ethan Page for the titles at Night 1 of Gold Rush on November 18, but failed to win the match. On the December 16 episode of NXT, during a match against Blake Monroe, they botched a pinfall, resulting in an unplanned title change where Hail won the NXT Women's North American Championship, her first title in her career. On January 6, 2026, at NXT: New Year's Evil, Hail lost the title to Izzi Dame, ending her reign at 21 days.

== Personal life ==
On August 27, 2026 Knisley announced that she had been diagnosed with alopecia areata.

== Other media ==
=== Video games ===
| Year | Title | Notes | Ref. |
|---|---|---|---|
| 2024 | WWE 2K24 | Video game debut | |
| 2025 | WWE 2K25 | | |
| 2026 | WWE 2K26 | | |

== Championships and accomplishments ==
- Pro Wrestling Illustrated
  - Ranked No. 115 of the top 250 female singles wrestlers in the PWI Women's 250 in 2023
- WWE
  - NXT Women's North American Championship (1 time)
