= Sunday Night's Main Event =

2026 WWE television special and livestreaming event

- Promotional poster featuring Trick Williams and Lil Yachty
- Promotion: WWE
- Brand(s): Raw; SmackDown
- Date: September 6, 2026
- City: Atlanta, Georgia
- Venue: State Farm Arena
- Attendance: 11,429

WWE event chronology
| ← Previous; NXT Heatwave | Next → Worlds Collide |

Saturday Night's Main Event chronology
| ← Previous; XLV | Next → — |

Sunday Night's Main Event was a 2026 professional wrestling television special and livestreaming event produced by WWE, held for wrestlers from the promotion's main roster brands, Raw and SmackDown. It was a special Sunday edition of the periodic Saturday Night's Main Event series and was livestreamed on Peacock in the United States and on YouTube internationally. The special took place during Labor Day weekend on September 6, 2026, at the State Farm Arena in Atlanta, Georgia.

This was the first edition of the Saturday Night's Main Event series to be held on a Sunday as well as the first held during Labor Day weekend. It featured the in-ring debut of rapper Lil Yachty and the return of Bronson Reed following an injury. The event also featured a performance of the song "Backwards" by Quavo, an unreleased track off his album Qrömelife. The event's date was originally planned for Money in the Bank in New Orleans, Louisiana before it was rescheduled to October 10.

== Production ==
=== Background ===
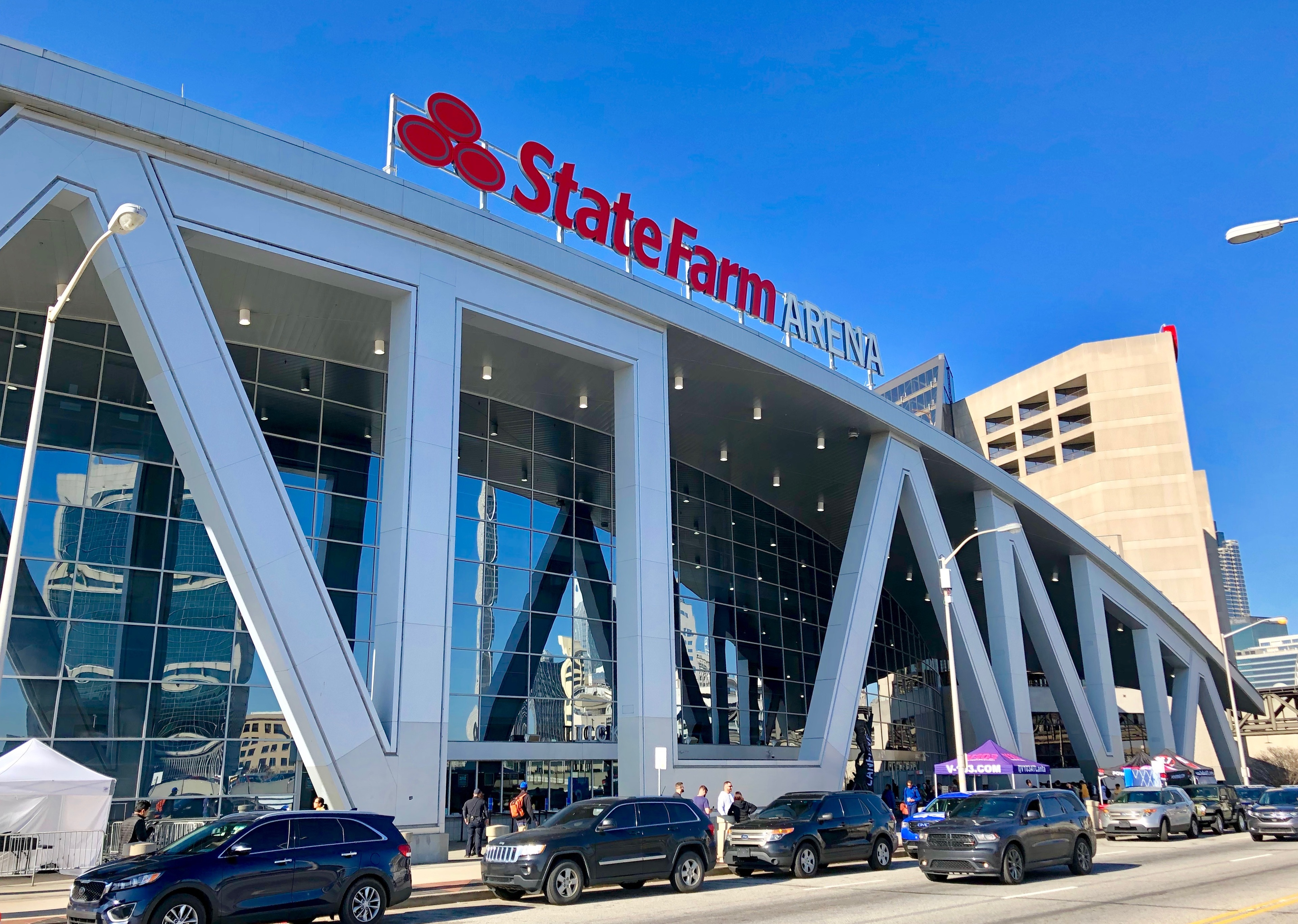
Sunday Night's Main Event, which was a special Sunday edition of Saturday Night's Main Event, was held at the State Farm Arena in Atlanta, Georgia.

Saturday Night's Main Event is a series of American professional wrestling television specials produced by WWE via NBC. The series was originally broadcast from 1985 to 1992, with the 1992 events produced by Fox, and were briefly held again from 2006 to 2008 by NBC. In December 2024, as part of NBC's acquisition of rights to air Friday Night SmackDown on the USA Network in the United States, Saturday Night's Main Event was also reinstated to be simulcast on USA and NBC's streaming service Peacock in the United States, with WWE's YouTube channel streaming the program internationally. However, in August 2025 after Peacock lost the rights to WWE's main roster premium live events (PLE) in the United States to ESPN, Saturday Night's Main Event moved exclusively to Peacock in the US under a multi-year deal that began in November 2025.

The 2026 Money in the Bank PLE was originally scheduled for Labor Day weekend on Sunday, September 6 in New Orleans, Louisiana, but on June 8, 2026, WWE revealed that Money in the Bank would instead take place one month later on Saturday, October 10 in New Orleans, with a special Sunday edition of Saturday Night's Main Event, titled Sunday Night's Main Event, taking place on September 6 at the State Farm Arena in Atlanta, Georgia, held for wrestlers from the Raw and SmackDown brands. This was the first edition of the Saturday Night's Main Event series to be held on a Sunday and during Labor Day weekend. On August 28, 2026, WWE announced that Quavo would be performing his unreleased song "Backwards" live during the event.

=== Storylines ===
The event included six matches that resulted from scripted storylines. Results were predetermined by WWE's writers on the Raw and SmackDown brands, while storylines were produced on WWE's weekly television shows, Monday Night Raw and Friday Night SmackDown.

On August 15, SmackDown General Manager Nick Aldis announced on his social media pages that Cody Rhodes would take on Randy Orton at the event. On the August 17 episode of Raw, WWE announced that Oba Femi would be fighting against Bron Breakker during the event. On the August 21 episode of SmackDown, WWE announced that rapper and Trick Williams's manager, Lil Yachty, would make his in-ring debut in a match with Baron Corbin with the condition that Williams would get a match for Corbin's WWE United States Championship if Yachty could survive for 5 minutes.

== Results ==
| No. | Results | Stipulations | Times |
|---|---|---|---|
| 1^{P} | Dominik Mysterio (with JD McDonagh, Liv Morgan, Raquel Rodriguez, and Roxanne Perez) defeated Joe Hendry by pinfall | Singles match | 6:00 |
| 2 | Lil Yachty defeated Baron Corbin by surviving the 5-minute time limit | No Disqualification match with a 5-minute time limit Since Yachty lasted for five minutes, Trick Williams immediately received a rematch for the WWE United States Championship against Corbin. | 5:00 |
| 3 | Trick Williams (with Lil Yachty) defeated Baron Corbin (c) by pinfall | Singles match for the WWE United States Championship | 11:15 |
| 4 | Oba Femi defeated Bron Breakker by disqualification | Singles match | 13:20 |
| 5 | Jade Cargill, Michin, and B-Fab defeated Charlotte Flair, Alexa Bliss, and Tatum Paxley by pinfall | Six-woman tag team match | 9:40 |
| 6 | Randy Orton defeated Cody Rhodes by pinfall | Singles match | 18:30 |
(c) / – the champion(s) heading into the match; P / – the match was broadcast on the pre-show
