= The Grey Album (disambiguation) =

The Grey Album is a 2004 album by Danger Mouse, a mix of the Beatles' White Album and Jay Z's Black Album.

The Grey Album may also refer to:

- Beatallica (EP), Beatallica's second EP, released in 2004
- Echo & the Bunnymen (album), Echo & the Bunnymen's fifth album, released in 1987
- Grey (album), Sandy Lam's fourth album, released in 1987
- The Velvet Underground (album), the Velvet Underground's third album, released in 1969
- The Grey Album (book), a 2012 book of literary and cultural criticism by Kevin Young
