= Backlash (2026) =

WWE premium live event

Backlash: Tampa
- Promotional poster featuring Roman Reigns
- Promotion: WWE
- Brand(s): Raw; SmackDown
- Date: May 9, 2026
- City: Tampa, Florida
- Venue: Benchmark International Arena
- Attendance: 14,712

WWE event chronology
← Previous; WrestleMania 42	Next → Saturday Night's Main Event XLIV

Backlash chronology
← Previous; 2025	Next → —

The 2026 Backlash, also promoted as Backlash: Tampa, was a professional wrestling premium live event (PLE) produced by WWE, held for wrestlers from the promotion's main roster brands, Raw and SmackDown. It was the 21st Backlash and took place on Saturday, May 9, 2026, at the Benchmark International Arena in Tampa, Florida. The concept of the event was based around the backlash from WrestleMania 42.

In order to lower the risk of clashing with the main card of Ultimate Fighting Championship's (UFC) pay-per-view event, UFC 328, Backlash had a special start time of 6:00 p.m. Eastern Time. This was also the first Backlash to livestream on ESPN Unlimited in the United States, as well as the first to air live on an ESPN linear channel, as the first hour was simulcast on ESPN2. This would also be the final Backlash to air on Abema in Japan, which merged under Netflix on October 1.

Five matches were contested at the event. In the main event, Roman Reigns defeated Jacob Fatu to retain Raw's World Heavyweight Championship. In other prominent matches, Iyo Sky defeated Asuka, Trick Williams defeated Sami Zayn to retain SmackDown's WWE United States Championship, and in the opening bout, Bron Breakker defeated Seth Rollins.

== Production ==
=== Background ===
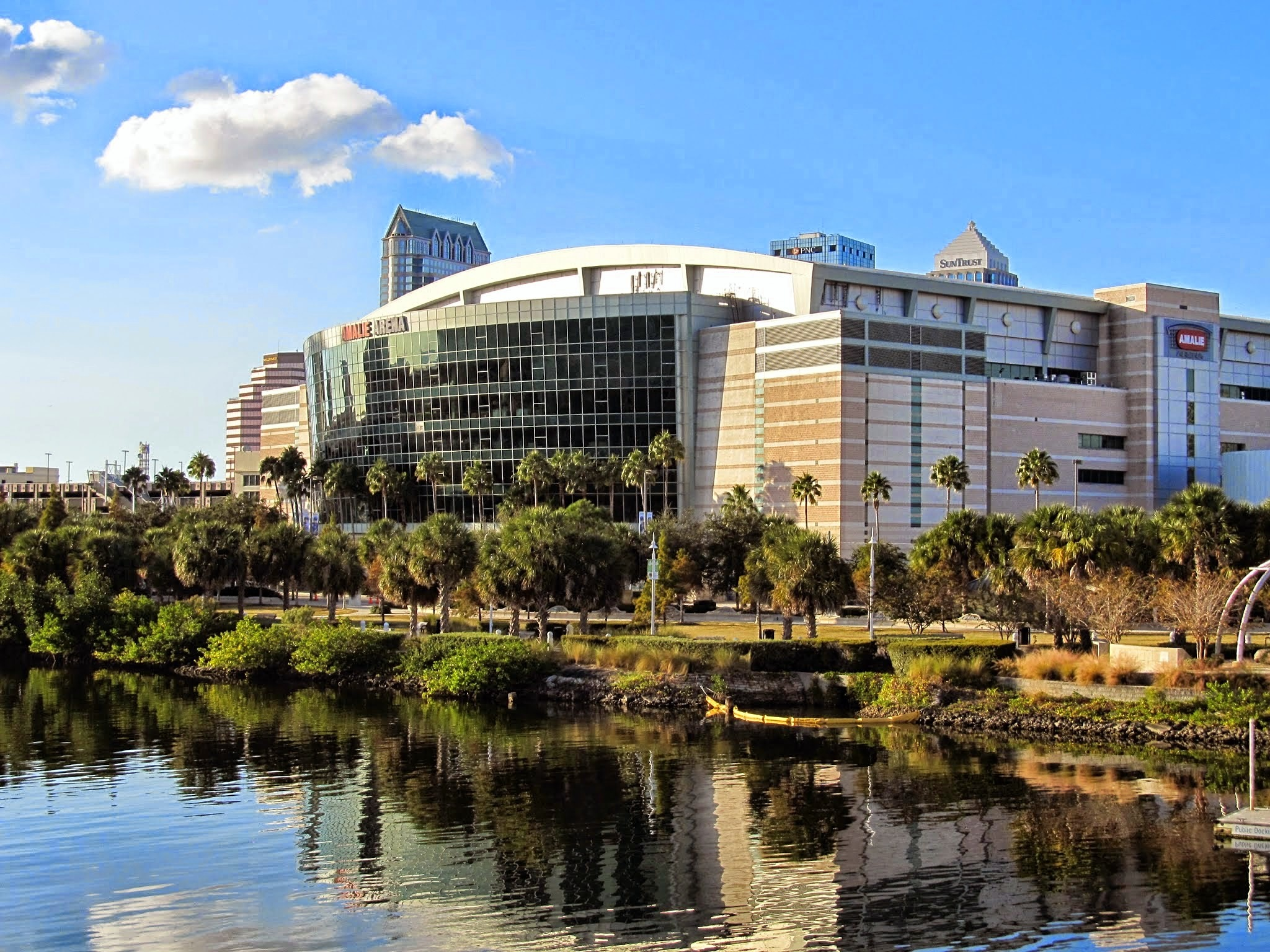
The 21st Backlash was held at the Benchmark International Arena in Tampa, Florida.

Backlash is a professional wrestling premium live event (PLE) that was established by WWE in 1999. It was held annually from 1999 to 2009, but was then discontinued until it was reinstated in 2016, although an event was not held in 2019. The event was originally broadcast exclusively via pay-per-view (PPV) before it began simulcasting on WWE's livestreaming platforms in 2016. The original concept of the event was based around the backlash from WWE's flagship event, WrestleMania. The events between 2016 and 2020 did not carry this theme; however, the 2021 edition returned the event to this original concept.

On January 31, 2026, WWE Chief Content Officer Paul "Triple H" Levesque announced that the 21st Backlash would take place on Saturday, May 9, 2026, at the Benchmark International Arena in Tampa, Florida, and would feature wrestlers from the Raw and SmackDown brand divisions. It was based around the backlash of WrestleMania 42 and was promoted as Backlash: Tampa. This marked WWE's first major event to be held in Tampa since Hell in a Cell in 2021 during the ThunderDome era. WWE ambassador John Cena, who retired from in-ring competition in December 2025, was confirmed to appear to make a major announcement.

=== Broadcast outlets ===
The PLE was broadcast on traditional PPV outlets worldwide. It was also available to livestream on ESPN Unlimited in the United States, Netflix in most international markets, SuperSport in Sub-Saharan Africa, and Abema in Japan. This marked the first Backlash to livestream on ESPN's app in the United States, as WWE's contract with Peacock to air main roster PLEs expired at the conclusion of Clash in Paris in August 2025. During the May 1 episode of Friday Night SmackDown, WWE announced that in the United States, the first hour would also be simulcast on ESPN2, marking the first Backlash to air on an ESPN linear channel.

In order to lower the risk of clashing with the main card of Ultimate Fighting Championship's (UFC) PPV event, UFC 328, Backlash had a special start time of 6:00 p.m. Eastern Time. This was the third consecutive Backlash to take place on the same night as a UFC PPV event since the formation TKO Group Holdings.

=== Storylines ===
The event included five matches that resulted from scripted storylines. Results were predetermined by WWE's writers on the Raw and SmackDown brands, while storylines were produced on WWE's weekly television shows, Monday Night Raw and Friday Night SmackDown.

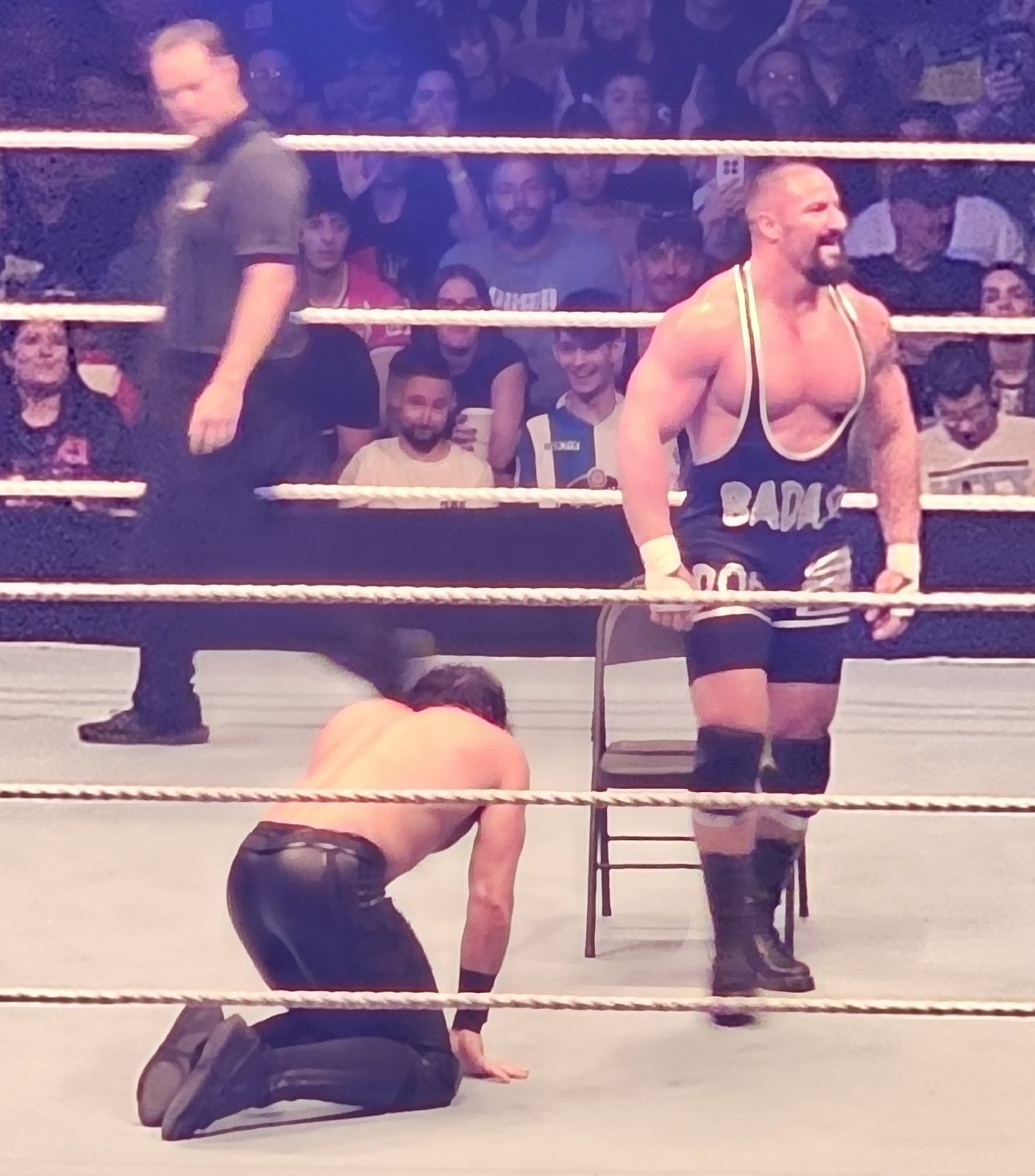
Seth Rollins (on knees) feuded with Bron Breakker (right) and wrestled each other at Backlash

At WrestleMania 41, Seth Rollins allied himself with Paul Heyman. On the following episode of Raw, Bron Breakker also aligned himself with Rollins and Heyman. At Saturday Night's Main Event XXXIX on May 24, Bronson Reed returned to assist Rollins and Breakker in a victorious effort, leading to the formation of The Vision. However, months later on the October 13 episode of Raw, Breakker and Reed turned on Rollins, attacking him and expelling him from the group. Because of the attack, Rollins was forced to vacate the World Heavyweight Championship. After that, The Vision added Logan Paul and Austin Theory to the group. At the Royal Rumble during the eponymous match, a masked individual attacked Breakker, causing his elimination. Following that, a series of attacks by masked individuals targeted The Vision over several weeks. During this time, both Breakker and Reed were sidelined with an injury. At Elimination Chamber on February 28, a returning Rollins revealed himself as the masked assailant after interfering in the men's Elimination Chamber match to attack Paul. On Night 1 of WrestleMania 42, Rollins lost his match against Gunther after Breakker returned and struck Rollins with a spear. On the following Raw, The Vision welcomed back Breakker, who trash talked Rollins, with him subsequently attacking Breakker before being outnumbered by Theory and Paul. Despite external interference from the returning Street Profits (Angelo Dawkins and Montez Ford), who fended off Paul and Theory, Breakker got the upper hand on Rollins. The following week, Rollins called out Breakker questioning his actions, to which Breakker replied that he was tired of fighting Rollins's battles, and that he only joined Rollins because he needed Heyman on his side. Rollins then challenged Breakker to a match at Backlash, which was later made official.

After SummerSlam in August 2025, Rhea Ripley and Iyo Sky, who both competed for the Women's World Championship at the event, maintained a friendly relationship, much to the dismay of Sky's former Damage CTRL stablemates The Kabuki Warriors (Asuka and Kairi Sane), but more specifically Asuka, who confronted Sky multiple times. On the September 22 episode of Raw, Asuka and a conflicted Sane betrayed Sky. This began a rivalry, with Ripley and Sky subsequently defeating The Kabuki Warriors at Crown Jewel. After that, The Kabuki Warriors won the WWE Women's Tag Team Championship, and Ripley and Sky subsequently faced The Kabuki Warriors multiple times in singles and tag team matches, including Ripley and Sky's team defeating The Kabuki Warriors's team in the Women's WarGames match at Survivor Series: WarGames, and also defeating them on the Raw on Netflix Anniversary Show on January 5, 2026, to win the title. On the February 27 episode of SmackDown, Ripley and Sky, now known as Rhiyo, lost the title. After that, Asuka continually mistreated Sane for her failures to help her, and on the March 23 episode of Raw, Sky approached Sane and stated she deserved better treatment. The following week, Asuka and Sane appeared ringside during Sky's match, with Asuka forcing Sane to interfere, however, Sane did nothing. After Sky spotted Asuka mistreating Sane at ringside, Sky attacked Asuka, a distraction that cost Sky the match. On the Raw before WrestleMania 42, Sky faced Sane, and despite Ripley's involvement, Asuka interfered and cost Sky the win. The following week, Rhiyo defeated The Kabuki Warriors in a tag team match. Following that, Ripley was transferred to the SmackDown brand after winning the WWE Women's Championship while Sane was legitimately released from WWE. On the April 27 episode, Asuka attacked Sky, costing her a match for the WWE Women's Intercontinental Championship. Later that night, it was subsequently announced that Asuka would face Sky at Backlash.

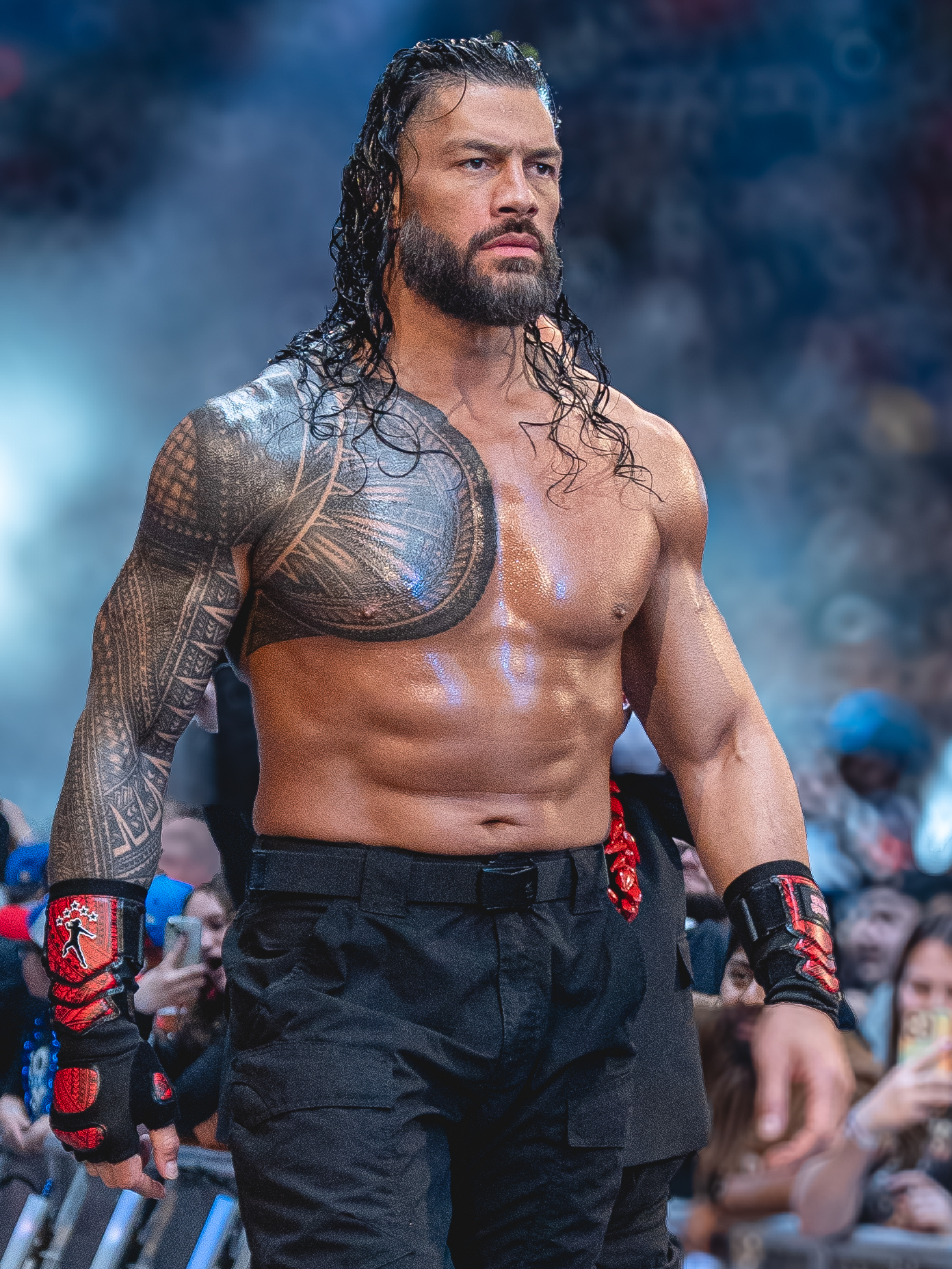
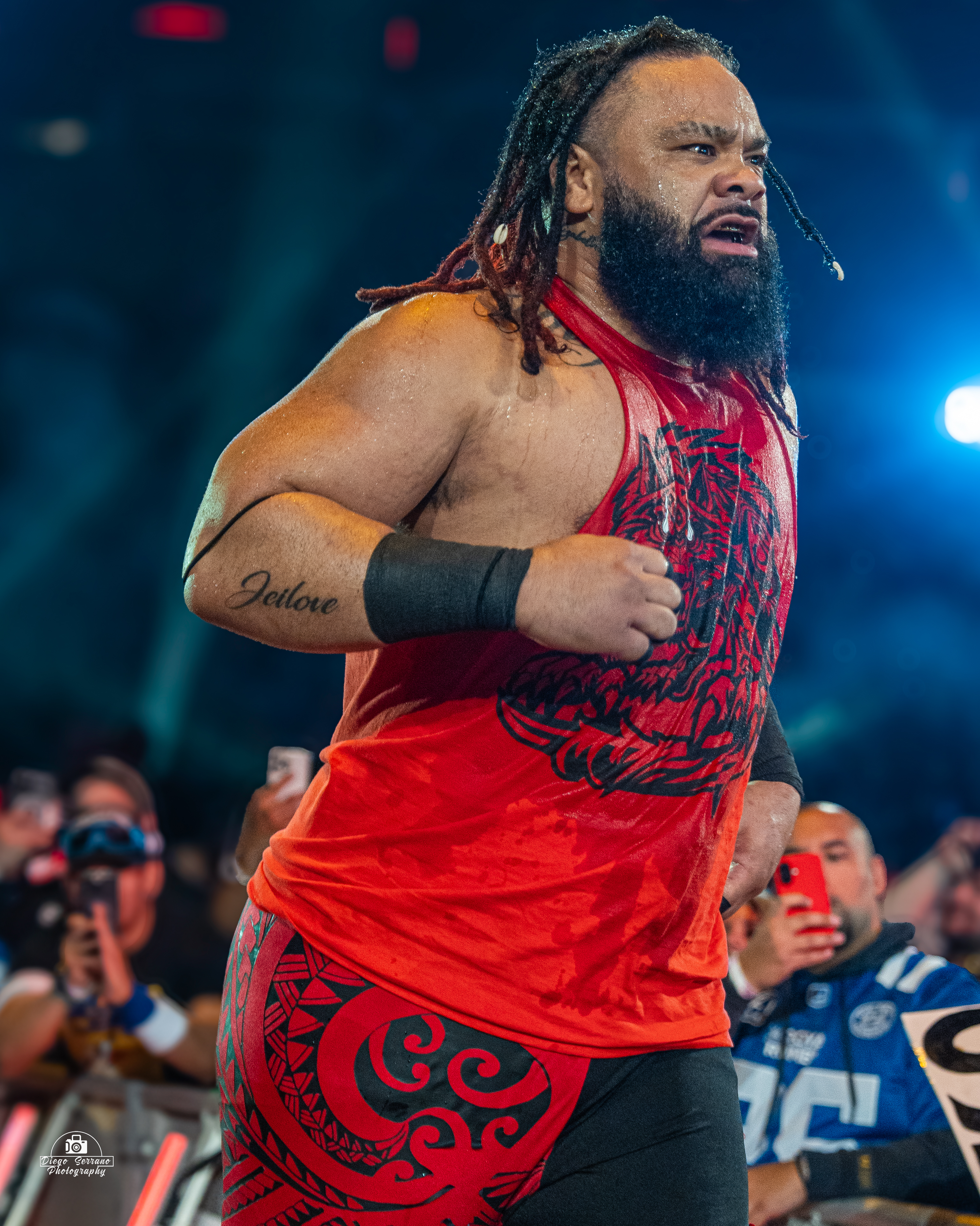
Roman Reigns defended Raw's World Heavyweight Championship against his cousin Jacob Fatu.

In June 2024, Jacob Fatu, a member of the prominent Anoaʻi family, made his WWE debut and joined The Bloodline stable, led by his cousin Solo Sikoa, and once led by his other cousin, Roman Reigns. After Reigns returned at SummerSlam to cost Sikoa an Undisputed WWE Championship match, Fatu, as Sikoa's enforcer, was then embroiled into a feud with Reigns. At Bad Blood on October 5, Fatu and Sikoa lost to Reigns in a tag team match after interference from a returning Jimmy Uso, marking Fatu's first loss in WWE. At Crown Jewel on November 2, Fatu, Sikoa, and Tama Tonga defeated the original incarnation of The Bloodline of Reigns and The Usos (Jimmy and Jey Uso) in a six-man tag team match. At Survivor Series: WarGames on November 30, The Bloodline's team lost to Reigns and The Usos's team in a WarGames match. Reigns would then reclaim the Tribal Chief title on the Raw premiere on Netflix in January 2025 by defeating Sikoa to end the rivalry. After multiple weeks of dissension, Fatu betrayed Sikoa at Money at the Bank on June 7 by attacking him in the namesake ladder match, leaving The Bloodline and turning face. After Reigns won the men's Royal Rumble match at the eponymous event in January 2026, Reigns subsequently won the World Heavyweight Championship in the main event of Night 2 of WrestleMania 42, transferring Reigns to Raw. Reigns and The Usos reunited the following night on Raw, but they were interrupted by Fatu, who was part of SmackDown at the time, with Fatu stating that he wanted everything that Reigns had, including the title, before challenging Reigns to a title match at Backlash. Reigns stated that he did not think Fatu was ready for a title match and said he would give Fatu a week before making his decision. There, Reigns stated that he still felt that Fatu did not deserve a title match, and that giving him one would be nepotism. After Fatu attacked Reigns, he accepted the challenge.

On Night 2 of WrestleMania 42, Trick Williams, accompanied by Lil Yachty, defeated Sami Zayn to win the WWE United States Championship. On that week's SmackDown during Williams and Yachty's celebration, they appeared with a gingerbread man mascot, which Williams had already used the previous week to mock Zayn. There, the mascot attacked Yachty and Williams before revealing itself to be Zayn in disguise, who subsequently performed a Helluva Kick on Williams. The following week, Zayn destroyed the Gingerbread man costume, prompting Williams to attack Zayn. Later that night, Williams challenged Zayn with his title on the line at Backlash, which Zayn accepted and it was made official by SmackDown General Manager Nick Aldis.

At Elimination Chamber in February, Danhausen made his WWE debut. On the following week's episode of SmackDown, Danhausen talked with the brand's General Manager Nick Aldis about being inducted into the WWE Hall of Fame and stated that Aldis should find him a mentor to help on it. Aldis then introduced The Miz to Danhausen, however, Miz did not like the idea, and Danhausen "cursed" Miz in response. Miz continued to be "cursed" by Danhausen, leading him into a streak of bad luck, however, Miz refused to believe that the "curse" existed. During this time, Miz allied himself with Kit Wilson, who also took issues with Danhausen and was "cursed" in the process; in one of the occasions, both Miz and Wilson lost a WWE Tag Team Championship match after the referee suffered a cramp in his arm, preventing him from counting a pinfall. Wilson subsequently lost a match against Danhausen after a pyro malfunction on the April 10 episode. On Night 2 of WrestleMania 42, Miz and Wilson interrupted the event's host John Cena as Miz demanded a WrestleMania moment. Danhausen appeared, accompanied by little people dressed like him. After Wilson called one of the little people "toxic", Danhausen ordered another little person to hit Wilson with a low blow and then all of them attacked him. Then, Danhausen performed an eye poke variant of Cena's Five Knuckle Shuffle on Miz. On that week's SmackDown, Miz also lost to Danhausen after another pyro malfunction, and on the May 1 episode after both Miz and Wilson unsuccessfully tried to trap Danhausen, Miz subsequently said he believed in the "curse" and agreed to mentor Danhausen. Afterwards, Wilson appeared and begged Miz not to join Danhausen. While Miz initially seemed to join forces with Danhausen, he instead attacked him, revealing the turn to be a ruse, with Wilson joining the assault. Later that night, Danhausen spoke with Aldis, who granted him a tag team match against Miz and Wilson at Backlash, however, Danhausen would have to find a tag team partner, which he agreed.

==== Cancelled matches ====
At Elimination Chamber, SmackDown's Randy Orton had won the men's Elimination Chamber match to earn a title match for his own brand's Undisputed WWE Championship at WrestleMania 42. On that week's SmackDown, Cody Rhodes won the championship, confirming his status as the defending champion. Over the prior few months, a match between the two had been teased due their history together as former members of The Legacy, and their relationship as mentor and mentee. The two had been good friends since Rhodes returned to WWE at WrestleMania 38 in 2022. However, during the contract signing on the March 13 episode of SmackDown, a conflicted Orton viciously attacked Rhodes, turning heel for the first time since 2021, with Orton determined to win his 15th world championship. In the weeks following Orton's betrayal, he was constantly on the phone receiving advice from a mysterious person, who was revealed to be Pat McAfee on the April 3 episode. McAfee then stated that he believed that WWE was going in a direction that nobody liked, and that Orton would save the business. Though the storyline was intended to be for Aleister Black, this was changed to McAfee due to low ticket sales leading to fan backlash. Later, McAfee stated that if Orton lost, he would leave the professional wrestling industry forever. The match was won by Rhodes with Orton attacking him post-match. As a result of heavy fan criticism due to the use of celebrities, McAfee opted out from the storyline as well as a reported tag team match, where if had Orton won the championship, McAfee and Orton would have faced Rhodes and Jelly Roll at Backlash, but these plans were scrapped.

== Event ==
Other on-screen personnel
Role:	Name:
English commentators	Michael Cole
English commentators	Wade Barrett
Spanish commentators	Marcelo Rodríguez
Spanish commentators	Jerry Soto
Ring announcer	Alicia Taylor
Referees	Danilo Anfibio
Referees	Jason Ayers
Referees	Shawn Bennett
Referees	Daphanie LaShaunn
Referees	Eddie Orengo
Interviewers	Cathy Kelley
Interviewers	Byron Saxton
Interviewers	Jackie Redmond
Pre-show panel	Michael Cole
Pre-show panel	Big E
Pre-show panel	Corey Graves
Pre-show panel	Peter Rosenberg

=== Preliminary matches ===
Seth Rollins versus Bron Breakker (accompanied by Paul Heyman) opened the event. Breakker immediately missed a spear, allowing Rollins to inflict early offense before Breakker could gain control. At ringside, Rollins interrupted a charge by Breakker with a superkick. Breakker sent Rollins over the announce table with a clothesline. Rollins attempted a superplex, which Breakker reversed into a Falcon Arrow for a two-count. After Rollins countered a Frankensteiner, he executed a Pedigree and a Stomp. Heyman made a distraction, allowing Breakker's The Vision stablemates Logan Paul and Austin Theory to interfere; however, Rollins sent them running with a steel chair. As Rollins re-entered the ring, Breakker immediately hit him with a spear for a near-fall. After Rollins countered another spear into a Pedigree, Breakker intercepted a Stomp from the middle rope with a spear followed by another spear for the pinfall victory.

The next match was a WrestleMania rematch for the WWE United States Championship between champion Trick Williams (accompanied by Lil Yachty) and challenger Sami Zayn. Zayn attacked Williams with chops in the corner, but Williams eventually retaliated with a clothesline at ringside. Zayn responded with a Blue Thunder Bomb. He then faked a knee injury for a roll-up pin attempt. After Yachty distracted the referee, Zayn hit Williams with a kendo stick. As Zayn prepared for the Helluva Kick, Yachty hit Zayn with a kendo stick, allowing Williams to land the Trick Kick for a near-fall. Zayn executed a DDT on Williams against the steel steps before attacking Yachty with a kendo stick and a Helluva Kick. Zayn missed the Helluva Kick on Williams as he countered with the Trick Shot to retain the title.

Next, Danhausen and his mystery partner faced The Miz and Kit Wilson. Danhausen opened his "cloning machine" to reveal Minihausen as his partner. Wilson attacked Minihausen, who responded with strikes and a springboard spinning shoulder. Minihausen chased Wilson toward the stage, eventually entering the cloning machine. After the machine was activated, multiple versions of Minihausen emerged and attacked Wilson; the original Minihausen then performed an airplane spin into a Wasteland on Wilson. Wilson blocked the curse with a mirror and then Miz hit Minihausen with the Skull Crushing Finale. Danhausen broke the ensuing pinfall attempt. Miz tried to use a fire extinguisher that malfunctioned and sprayed Miz and Wilson in the eyes. Danhausen then delivered a pump kick to Miz for the win.

Iyo Sky versus Asuka followed. Sky sent Asuka into the corner and kicked her in the face while utilizing the ring apron. Asuka trapped Sky in a Boston crab through the ropes and began targeting Sky's arm. Sky countered an armbar attempt by applying the Asuka Lock, forcing Asuka to break the hold with the ropes. At ringside, Asuka attempted to blind Sky with the green mist but Sky blocked it with a laptop followed by a crossbody off the announce table. Sky attempted the Over the Moonsault, which Asuka successfully blocked. Asuka then applied the Asuka Lock; however, Sky managed to roll through to reach the ropes. Sky was hit with a German Suplex but responded with a German Suplex of her own. She then executed the Bullet Train Attack and the Over the Moonsault to defeat Asuka. After the match, both competitors embraced each other.

John Cena came out to announce the John Cena Classic, a competition that showcases present stars against future stars. Fans would vote to crown the inaugural champion from a pool of all participants, noting that even those who suffered losses remain eligible to win the competition.

=== Main event ===
Roman Reigns defended the World Heavyweight Championship against Jacob Fatu in the main event. Fatu knocked Reigns to the floor for a suicide dive and applied the Tongan Death Grip, subsequently sending the champion into the ring post. After Fatu voluntarily released the hold, Reigns recovered and executed a neck snap across the top rope. Fatu shoved Reigns from the corner and trapped his arm for a clothesline. When Fatu collided with the ring post, Reigns connected with a Superman Punch for a one-count. Fatu later executed a running Umaga Attack, but Reigns countered with another Superman Punch for a near-fall. At ringside, Fatu powerbombed Reigns through the announcers' table. Back in the ring, Reigns hit a spear for a two-count, but Fatu countered a subsequent charge with a pop-up Samoan drop and a triple jump moonsault for another near-fall. Fatu missed a Swanton bomb onto Reigns' raised knees. Fatu delivered another Umaga Attack and reapplied the Tongan Death Grip; however, Reigns survived the hold. Following a referee bump, Reigns hit a Superman Punch and a spear, although the recovering official stopped the count at two. Fatu attempted the Death Grip a final time, but Reigns sent Fatu face-first into an exposed turnbuckle. Reigns then executed a final spear to retain the championship. After the match, an irate Fatu attacked Reigns, applied another Tongan Death Grip, and stood tall with the championship belt to close out the show.

== Reception ==
The first hour of the event on ESPN2 drew 998,000 viewers with a 0.33 rating in the 18 to 49 demo.

Thomas Hall of 411Mania gave the event a 9.0 out of 10 rating, stating that the show vastly exceeded his expectations. He specifically lauded the pacing and the significant time allotted to each match, drawing a favorable contrast to the shorter match lengths seen at WrestleMania 42. Hall awarded the first two matches of the event a "B" grade, including the opening bout between Seth Rollins and Bron Breakker. Despite describing that contest as "good enough", he was critical of its "sloppy moments" and felt it failed to reach a higher level of performance. The final three matches each received a "B+" grade. Hall praised the "goofy" entertainment value of the tag team match featuring Danhausen and Minihausen, though he acknowledged that the comedic wrestling style might not appeal to all viewers. Regarding the penultimate match between Asuka and Iyo Sky, he remarked that despite the high quality of the performance, the presence of Kairi Sane was necessary to fully complete the story. The main event prompted Hall to advocate for a future rematch between Roman Reigns and Jacob Fatu.

Dave Meltzer of the Wrestling Observer Newsletter gave overall positive reviews to the event. The opening bout between Seth Rollins vs. Bron Breakker and Iyo Sky vs Asuka received 4 1/4 stars. The United States Championship match and the tag team match received the event's lowest ratings of 2 3/4 and 2 stars. The main event between Roman Reigns and Jacob Fatu for the World Heavyweight Championship was awarded 4 3/4 stars (the highest rating on the card).

== Aftermath ==
This would be the final Backlash to air on Abema in Japan before moving to Netflix on October 1.

=== Raw ===
The following episode of Raw began with Raw General Manager Adam Pearce informing World Heavyweight Champion Roman Reigns that he didn't want Jacob Fatu in the arena due to his attacks on referees. Later, Jimmy Uso told Reigns that it was time to let go of Fatu. Afterwards, Jey Uso told Fatu that doing the wrong thing would make things hard on him and his family. Fatu then knocked out Jey with headbutts before warning that Reigns would have to beat an acknowledgement out of him. Fatu then took out Jimmy and later did the same to Reigns while stating that he left him and his family broke, before ending the attack by sending Reigns through the announce table. As Fatu walked up the ramp with the title belt, he returned to send Reigns and the Usos through the barricade. The following week, a Tribal Combat between Reigns and Fatu was scheduled for Clash in Italy.

Also on Raw, Asuka was proud of Iyo Sky for stepping up and taking her place, and they embraced with a hug.

== Results ==
No.	Results	Stipulations	Times
1	Bron Breakker (with Paul Heyman) defeated Seth Rollins by pinfall	Singles match	21:26
2	Trick Williams (c) (with Lil Yachty) defeated Sami Zayn by pinfall	Singles match for the WWE United States Championship	12:56
3	Danhausen and Minihausen defeated The Miz and Kit Wilson by pinfall	Tag team match	11:38
4	Iyo Sky defeated Asuka by pinfall	Singles match	18:07
5	Roman Reigns (c) defeated Jacob Fatu by pinfall	Singles match for the World Heavyweight Championship	17:50
(c) / – the champion(s) heading into the match
