= WWE in Mexico =

Series of professional wrestling events in Mexico by WWE

- Created by: Vince McMahon
- Promotions: WWE
- Brands: Raw; SmackDown; AAA

WWE is an American professional wrestling promotion based in Stamford, Connecticut in the United States owned by TKO. The company has been producing events in Mexico since the beginning of the 21st century.

== History ==
In 2004, WWE made its first tour in Mexico with WWE RAW: Wrestlemania XX Revenge Tour at the Arena Monterrey in the city of the same name. The event, which was also the first house show of the Raw brand, took place on April 3 having as main event a match between Chris Benoit and Triple H, who were in a strong rivalry for the World Heavyweight Championship. After the great success of the Mexican fans, Raw returned in November of that same year.

On October 17, 2011, the Palacio de los Deportes would host a first live event for Raw. The event featured a tag team match between John Cena and Jim Ross against then WWE Champion Alberto Del Rio and Michael Cole. Attendance was 14,845. That same week on SmackDown brand, another event was held at the same venue, featuring a match between Sin Cara Azul and Sin Cara Negro; the attendance was 11,000.

WWE was scheduled to return to the country again in 2020, but the tour was postponed due to the COVID-19 pandemic that began in March of that year. After a two-year hiatus, the promotion returned to Mexico with two events in October 2022, which were both a success.

In 2025, WWE acquired Lucha Libre AAA Worldwide. The company began to have its talent appearing in AAA programming.

== Broadcast ==
WWE programs began airing in Mexico in the late 1990s. MVS TV was the first channel to acquire the broadcast rights, airing WWF/E Raw (is War) from 1999 and WWE SmackDown from 2005 until the cessation of broadcasts for both brands in 2008. However, Raw would return to airing in mid-2009 on the renamed channel 52MX, which at that time also aired WWE Experience and pay-per-view events.

Televisa and TV Azteca, the two giants of Mexican television, began airing both Raw (via Canal 5) at 10:00pm and SmackDown (via Azteca 7) at 9:00pm respectively starting in 2008. Between 2013 and 2014, WWE would stop airing on open television for national audiences, focusing on pay television.

Starting in January 2025, it was announced that Netflix will broadcast WWE's weekly shows in the country, in addition to premium events (previously called PPV) and documentaries, as part of the agreement between the company and the platform. The company, through the ownership of AAA, aired WWE AAA on Fox.

== Events in Mexico ==
=== 2000s ===
Date	Event/Brand	Venue	City	Final match	Ref
3 April 2004	WWE Raw: WrestleMania XX Revenge Tour	Arena Monterrey	Monterrey, NL	Chris Benoit vs. Triple H	
6 November 2004	WWE Raw House Show	Arena Monterrey	Monterrey, NL	Randy Orton and Chris Jericho vs. Triple H and Batista	
19 January 2006	WWE SmackDown House Show	Palacio de los Deportes	Mexico City	The Undertaker vs. Randy Orton	
20 January 2006	WWE SmackDown House Show	Auditorio Benito Juárez	Guadalajara, JAL	The Undertaker vs. Randy Orton	
21 January 2006	WWE SmackDown House Show	Arena Monterrey	Monterrey, NL	The Undertaker vs. John "Bradshaw" Layfield	
20 September 2006	WWE Raw House Show	Palacio de los Deportes	Mexico City	John Cena vs. Edge	
21 September 2006	WWE Raw House Show	Auditorio Benito Juárez	Guadalajara, JAL	John Cena vs. Edge	
22 September 2006	WWE Raw House Show	Plaza de Toros	Tijuana, BCN	Shawn Michaels, Triple H and Rey Mysterio Jr. vs. Randy Orton, Edge and Chavo Guerrero Jr.	
23 September 2006	WWE Raw House Show	Plaza Monumental	Monterrey, NL	John Cena vs. Edge	
22 March 2007	WWE SmackDown & ECW House Show	Palacio de los Deportes	Mexico City	Batista vs. Mr. Kennedy	
23 March 2007	WWE SmackDown & ECW House Show	Palacio de los Deportes	Mexico City	Batista vs. Mr. Kennedy vs. Montel Vontavious Porter	
24 March 2007	WWE SmackDown & ECW House Show	Gimnasio Manuel Bernardo Aguirre	Chihuahua City, CHH	Batista vs. Mr. Kennedy	
25 March 2007	WWE SmackDown & ECW House Show	Plaza de Toros	Monterrey, NL	Chris Benoit vs. Montel Vontavious Porter	
4 July 2007	WWE Raw House Show	-	Tijuana, BCN	John Cena, Bobby Lashley and Rey Mysterio Jr. vs. Randy Orton, Booker T and Umaga	
5 July 2007	WWE Raw House Show	-	Mexicali, BCN	John Cena vs. Randy Orton	
6 July 2007	WWE Raw House Show	Palacio de los Deportes	Mexico City	John Cena vs. Randy Orton	
7 July 2007	WWE Raw House Show	Palacio de los Deportes	Mexico City	John Cena, Bobby Lashley and Rey Mysterio Jr. vs. Randy Orton, Booker T and Umaga	
10 February 2008	WWE Smackdown & ECW House Show	-	Guadalajara, JAL	Edge vs. Rey Mysterio Jr.	
21 May 2008	WWE Raw House Show	Plaza de Toros Monumental	Monterrey, NL	John Cena vs. John "Bradshaw" Layfield	
22 May 2008	WWE Raw House Show	Plaza de Toros Santa Maria	Querétaro, QRO	Triple H vs. Umaga	
23 May 2008	WWE Raw House Show	Palacio de los Deportes	Mexico City	Triple H vs. Umaga	
24 May 2008	WWE Raw House Show	Palacio de los Deportes	Mexico City	Triple H and Shawn Michaels vs. Umaga and Snitsky	
16 October 2008	WWE SmackDown & ECW House Show	Arena Monterrey	Monterrey, NL	Triple H vs. The Big Show	
17 October 2008	WWE SmackDown & ECW House Show	Arena Monterrey	Monterrey, NL	Triple H vs. Vladimir Kozlov	
18 October 2008	WWE SmackDown & ECW House Show	Palacio de los Deportes	Mexico City	Triple H and The Undertaker vs. The Big Show and Vladimir Kozlov	
19 October 2008	WWE SmackDown & ECW House Show	Palacio de los Deportes	Mexico City	The Undertaker vs. The Big Show	
18 February 2009	WWE SmackDown House Show	Arena Vazquez Bruno	Tijuana, BCN	Triple H vs. Vladimir Kozlov	
19 February 2009	WWE SmackDown House Show	Plaza de Toros La Luz	León, GTO	Triple H vs. Vladimir Kozlov	
20 February 2009	WWE SmackDown House Show	VFG Arena	Guadalajara, JAL	Triple H vs. The Big Show	
27 May 2009	WWE Raw House Show	Arena Monterrey	Monterrey, NL	Batista and Rey Mysterio Jr. vs. Randy Orton and The Big Show	
28 May 2009	WWE Raw House Show	Arena Monterrey	Monterrey, NL	Batista and John Cena vs. Randy Orton and The Big Show	
29 May 2009	WWE Raw House Show	Plaza de Toros Santa Maria	Querétaro, QRO	Batista and Rey Mysterio Jr. vs. Randy Orton and The Big Show	
30 May 2009	WWE Raw House Show	Palacio de los Deportes	Mexico City	Rey Mysterio Jr. vs. Randy Orton	
25 September 2009	WWE Raw House Show	Plaza de Toros La Luz	León, GTO	John Cena, Triple H and Shawn Michaels vs. Randy Orton, Ted DiBiase Jr. and Cody Rhodes	
26 September 2009	WWE Raw House Show	VFG Arena	Guadalajara, JAL	John Cena vs. Randy Orton	
15 October 2009	WWE SmackDown & ECW House Show	Plaza de Toros Monumental	Monterrey, NL	The Undertaker vs. CM Punk	
16 October 2009	WWE SmackDown & ECW House Show	Estadio Hermanos Serdan	Puebla, PUE	Batista and The Undertaker vs. CM Punk and Kane	
17 October 2009	WWE SmackDown & ECW House Show	Palacio de los Deportes	Mexico City	The Undertaker, Batista and Rey Mysterio Jr. vs. CM Punk, Kane and Chris Jericho	
18 October 2009	WWE SmackDown & ECW House Show	Palacio de los Deportes	Mexico City	The Undertaker vs. CM Punk	

=== 2010s ===
Date	Event/Brand	Venue	City	Final match	Ref
14 February 2010	WWE SmackDown & ECW House Show	VFG Arena	Guadalajara, JAL	Rey Mysterio Jr vs. Batista	
5 May 2010	WWE Raw House Show	Arena Monterrey	Monterrey, NL	John Cena and Randy Orton vs. Batista and Sheamus	
6 May 2010	WWE Raw House Show	Plaza de Toros	Aguascalientes, AGS	John Cena, Randy Orton and The Big Show vs. Batista, Sheamus and The Miz	
6 May 2010	WWE SmackDown House Show	Palacio de los Deportes	Mexico City	Jack Swagger vs. The Undertaker	
7 May 2010	WWE Raw House Show	Estadio Hermanos Serdan	Puebla, PUE	John Cena, Randy Orton and The Big Show vs. Batista, Sheamus and The Miz	
7 May 2010	WWE SmackDown House Show	Plaza de Toros Santa Maria	Querétaro, QRO	Rey Mysterio Jr. vs. Jack Swagger	
8 May 2010	WWE SmackDown House Show	Plaza de Toros La Luz	León, GTO	Rey Mysterio Jr. vs. Jack Swagger	
8 May 2010	WWE Raw House Show	Plaza de Toros	Mexico City	John Cena, Randy Orton and The Big Show vs. Batista, Sheamus and The Miz	
9 May 2010	WWE SmackDown House Show	Arena Monterrey	Monterrey, NL	Rey Mysterio Jr. vs. Jack Swagger	
7 October 2010	WWE SmackDown House Show	Arena Monterrey	Monterrey, NL	Kane vs. Rey Mysterio Jr.	
8 October 2010	WWE SmackDown House Show	Palacio de los Deportes	Mexico City	The Undertaker vs. Kane	
9 October 2010	WWE SmackDown House Show	Palacio de los Deportes	Mexico City	Rey Mysterio Jr. and The Undertaker vs. Alberto Del Rio and Kane	
10 October 2010	WWE SmackDown House Show	VFG Arena	Guadalajara, JAL	Rey Mysterio Jr. and The Undertaker vs. Alberto Del Rio and Kane	
11 May 2011	WWE Raw House Show	Multi-Purpose Center	Hermosillo, SON	John Cena vs. The Miz	
12 May 2011	WWE Raw House Show	VFG Arena	Guadalajara, JAL	John Cena vs. The Miz	
13 May 2011	WWE Raw House Show	Palacio de los Deportes	Mexico City	John Cena vs. The Miz	
14 May 2011	WWE Raw House Show	Arena Monterrey	Monterrey, NL	John Cena vs. The Miz	
12 October 2011	WWE Raw House Show	Arena Monterrey	Monterrey, NL	John Cena vs. Alberto Del Rio	
13 October 2011	WWE SmackDown House Show	Arena Monterrey	Monterrey, NL	Mark Henry vs. The Big Show	
13 October 2011	WWE Raw House Show	Estadio Kukulcan	Mérida, YUC	John Cena vs. Alberto Del Rio	
14 October 2011	WWE Raw House Show	Estadio Hermanos Serdán	Puebla, PUE	John Cena vs. Alberto Del Rio	
14 October 2011	WWE SmackDown House Show	Estadio 20 de Noviembre	San Luis Potosí, SLP	Mark Henry vs. The Big Show	
15 October 2011	WWE SmackDown House Show	Estadio de Béisbol Beto Avila	Veracruz, VER	Mark Henry vs. The Big Show	
15 October 2011	WWE Raw SuperShow	Palacio de los Deportes	Mexico City	John Cena and Jim Ross vs. Alberto Del Rio and Michael Cole	
16 October 2011	WWE SmackDown	Palacio de los Deportes	Mexico City	Alberto Del Rio vs. The Big Show	
24 May 2012	WWE SmackDown House Show	Multi-Purpose Center	Hermosillo, SON	Sheamus vs. Alberto Del Rio vs. Daniel Bryan	
25 May 2012	WWE SmackDown House Show	Plaza de Toros	Aguascalientes, AGS	Sheamus vs. Alberto Del Rio vs. Daniel Bryan	
26 May 2012	WWE SmackDown House Show	VFG Arena	Guadalajara, JAL	Sheamus vs. Alberto Del Rio vs. Daniel Bryan	
16 October 2013	WWE Live (2013)	Plaza de Toros Santa Maria	Quéretaro, QRO	CM Punk vs. Curtis Axel	
17 October 2013	WWE Live (2013)	VFG Arena	Guadalajara, JAL	CM Punk vs. Curtis Axel and Paul Heyman	
18 October 2013	WWE Live (2013)	Arena CDMX	Mexico City	CM Punk vs. Curtis Axel and Paul Heyman	
19 October 2013	WWE Live (2013)	Arena Monterrey	Monterrey, NL	CM Punk vs. Curtis Axel	
18 October 2014	WWE Live (2014)	Arena CDMX	Mexico City	John Cena vs. Seth Rollins	
19 October 2014	WWE Live (2014)	Arena Monterrey	Monterrey, NL	John Cena vs. Seth Rollins	
16 October 2015	WWE Live (2015)	Coliseo Yucatán	Mérida, YUC	Roman Reigns vs. Bray Wyatt	
17 October 2015	WWE Live (2015)	Arena CDMX	Mexico City	Roman Reigns vs. Bray Wyatt	
18 October 2015	WWE Live (2015)	Arena Monterrey	Monterrey, NL	Roman Reigns vs. Bray Wyatt	
27 August 2016	WWE Live (2016)	Acropolis	Puebla, PUE	Roman Reigns vs. Seth Rollins	
28 August 2016	WWE Live (2016)	Domo de la Feria de Leon	León, GTO	Roman Reigns vs. Seth Rollins	
3 December 2016	WWE Live (2016)	Arena CDMX	Mexico City	Roman Reigns vs. Kevin Owens	
4 December 2016	WWE Live (2016)	Arena Coliseo de Monterrey	Monterrey, NL	Roman Reigns vs. Kevin Owens	
1 December 2017	WWE Live (2017)	Arena CDMX	Mexico City	AJ Styles vs. Jinder Mahal	
2 December 2017	WWE Live (2017)	Coliseo Yucatán	Mérida, YUC	AJ Styles vs. Jinder Mahal	
1 December 2018	WWE Live (2018)	Arena CDMX	Mexico City	AJ Styles vs. Samoa Joe	
30 November 2019	WWE Live (2019)	Arena CDMX	Mexico City	"The Fiend" Bray Wyatt vs. Rey Mysterio Jr.	

=== 2020s ===
Date	Event/Brand	Venue	City	Final match	Rep
29 October 2022	WWE Live (2022)	Arena Monterrey	Monterrey, NL	Seth Rollins vs. Austin Theory vs. Matt Riddle	
30 October 2022	WWE Live (2022)	Arena CDMX	Mexico City	Seth Rollins vs. Austin Theory vs. Matt Riddle	
22 July 2023	WWE SuperShow (2023)	Arena CDMX	Mexico City	Roman Reigns vs. Rey Mysterio Jr.	
23 July 2023	WWE SuperShow (2023)	Arena Monterrey	Monterrey, NL	Seth Rollins vs. Dominik Mysterio	
13 July 2024	WWE SuperShow Summer Tour (2024)	Arena CDMX	Mexico City	Cody Rhodes vs. Santos Escobar	
14 July 2024	WWE SuperShow Summer Tour (2024)	Arena Monterrey	Monterrey, NL	Cody Rhodes vs. Santos Escobar	
26 July 2025	WWE SuperShow Mexico (2025)	Arena CDMX	Mexico City	Gunther vs. Penta	
11 September 2026	WWE SmackDown	Arena CDMX	Mexico City	CM Punk vs. Sami Zayn for the Undisputed WWE Championship	
14 September 2026	WWE Raw in Mexico City special	Arena CDMX	Mexico City	Roman Reigns (c) vs. Penta for the World Heavyweight Championship	
