= Danowski =

Danowski is a surname. Notable people with the surname include:

- Ed Danowski (1911–1997), American football player
- John Danowski (born 1954), American lacrosse player
- Matt Danowski (born 1985), American lacrosse player

== See also ==
- Raymond Danowski Poetry Library, is a poetry library at Emory University in Atlanta, Georgia, U.S.
