= Kevin Young (poet) =

American writer (born 1970)

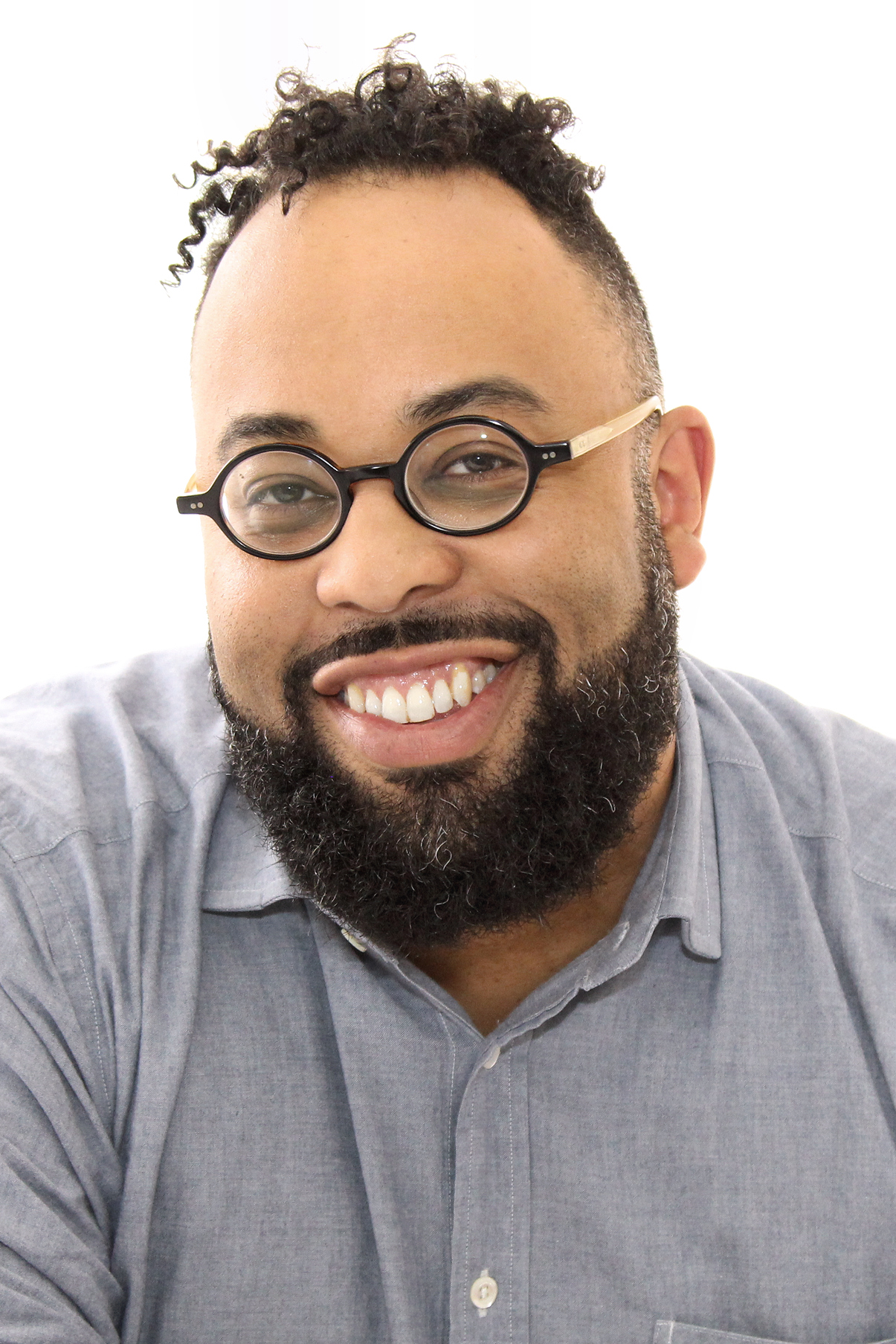
- Young at the 2017 Texas Book Festival
- Born: Kevin Young; November 8, 1970 (age 55); Lincoln, Nebraska, U.S.
- Education: Harvard College (AB); Brown University (MFA)
- Occupations: Poet; professor; editor; literary critic
- Spouse: Kate Tuttle
- Writing career
- Language: English
- Genres: Poetry, literary criticism
- Subject: Blues
- Notable awards: Guggenheim Fellowship; finalist, National Book Award
- Website: kevinyoungpoetry.com

Kevin Young (born November 8, 1970) is an American poet and the former director of the Smithsonian Institution National Museum of African American History and Culture. Author of 11 books and editor of eight others, Young previously served as Director of the Schomburg Center for Research in Black Culture at the New York Public Library. A winner of a Guggenheim Fellowship as well as a finalist for the National Book Award for his 2003 collection Jelly Roll: A Blues, Young was Atticus Haygood Professor of English and Creative Writing at Emory University and curator of Emory's Raymond Danowski Poetry Library. In March 2017, Young was named poetry editor of The New Yorker.

== Early life ==
Born in Lincoln, Nebraska, Young was the only child of two working parents, his father, Dr. Paul E. Young, was an ophthalmologist and his mother, Dr. Azzie Young, a chemist. Due to the careers of both of his parents, his family moved frequently throughout his youth. Young lived in six different places before he reached the age of ten, but his family ultimately settled in Topeka, Kansas. He first began to pursue writing when he was thirteen years old, after he attended a summer writing class at Washburn University.

Young attended Harvard College, where he studied with Seamus Heaney and Lucie Brock-Broido and became friends with writer Colson Whitehead. He graduated in 1992, then held a Stegner Fellowship at Stanford University (1992–94), where he worked with Denise Levertov. He received his Master of Fine Arts from Brown University, where Michael S. Harper served as a significant influence.

== Career ==
While in Boston and Providence, he was part of the African-American poetry group the Dark Room Collective. He is heavily influenced by the poets Langston Hughes, John Berryman, and Emily Dickinson and by the artist Jean-Michel Basquiat.

Young wrote much of his debut collection, Most Way Home, while still an undergraduate. Published by William Morrow in 1995, Most Way Home was selected by Lucille Clifton for the National Poetry Series and won Ploughshares' John C. Zacharis First Book Award. Writing in Ploughshares, Rob Arnold observes that in that first book Young "explores his own family's narratives, showing an uncanny awareness of voice and persona."

Young has described his next three books – To Repel Ghosts (named for a Jean-Michel Basquiat painting), Jelly Roll (a collection of love poems named for Jelly Roll Morton), and Black Maria – as an "American trilogy", calling the series Devil's Music.

Young's collection The Book of Hours (Knopf, 2014) won the 2015 Lenore Marshall Poetry Prize.

Young is also the author of For The Confederate Dead, Dear Darkness, Blues Laws: Selected and Uncollected Poems 1995–2015 (2016) and editor of Giant Steps: The New Generation of African American Writers (2000), Blues Poems (2003), Jazz Poems (2006), and John Berryman's Selected Poems (2004).

His poem "Black Cat Blues," originally published in The Virginia Quarterly Review, was included in The Best American Poetry 2005. Young's poetry has also appeared in The New Yorker, Poetry Magazine, The Paris Review, Ploughshares, and other literary magazines. In 2007, he served as guest editor for an issue of Ploughshares. He has written on art and artists for museums in Los Angeles and Minneapolis.

His 2003 book of poems Jelly Roll was a finalist for the National Book Award. Young was named a Guggenheim Foundation Fellow in 2003, as well as an NEA Literature Fellow in Poetry.

After stints at the University of Georgia and Indiana University, Young taught writing at Emory University, where he was the Atticus Haygood Professor of English and Creative Writing, as well as the curator of the Raymond Danowski Poetry Library, a large collection of first and rare editions of poetry in English.

In September 2016, Young became the Director of the Schomburg Center for Research in Black Culture at the New York Public Library.

In March 2017, he was named poetry editor of The New Yorker, to begin in November 2017.

Young is working on two books: a non-fiction book called Bunk on the U.S. history of lies and hoaxes, and a poetry collection that he has described as being "about African American history and also personal history, growing up in Kansas, which has a long black history including Langston Hughes and others."

In September 2020, he was named director of the National Museum of African-American History and Culture, to begin in January 2021. Elected to the American Academy of Arts and Sciences, the American Academy of Arts and Letters, and the Society of American Historians, Young was also named a Chancellor of the Academy of American Poets in 2020. As of March 14, 2025, he has been on personal leave and is not leading the museum. He officially stepped down in April 2025.

== Personal life ==
Young lives in Washington, DC.

== Awards ==
- 1992: Harvard University, Thomas T. Hoopes Prize for Most Way Home (Thesis/dissertation)
- 1993: National Poetry Series (selection) by Lucille Clifton for Most Way Home
- 1993: Ploughshares, John C. Zacharis First Book Prize for Most Way Home
- 2003: Patterson Poetry Prize
- 2003: National Book Award (Poetry) (finalist) for Jelly Roll
- 2003: Los Angeles Times, Book Prize (Poetry) (finalist) for Jelly Roll
- 2003: Guggenheim Fellowship
- 2007: Patterson Poetry Prize for Sustained Literary Achievement
- 2007: Quill Awards (Poetry) for For the Confederate Dead
- 2009: United States Artists, Fellow Award
- 2009: Pat Conroy Southern Book Prize (Poetry) for Dear Darkness
- 2013: National Book Critics Circle Award for Criticism (finalist) for The Grey Album
- 2013: PEN Open Book Award for The Grey Album
- 2014: Claremont Graduate University, Kingsley Tufts Poetry Award for Book of Hours
- 2015: Black Caucus of the American Library Association Literary Award (Poetry) for Book of Hours
- 2015: Academy of American Poets, Lenore Marshall Poetry Prize for Book of Hours
- 2016: American Academy of Arts and Sciences
- 2016: National Book Award, Autobiography/Biography (Hardcover) (longlisted) for Blue Laws
- 2017: Thomas Wolfe Prize
- 2017: Anisfield-Wolf Book Award in Nonfiction for Bunk
- 2017: Georgia Writers Hall of Fame Inductee
- 2017: National Book Critics Circle Award (finalist) for Bunk
- 2017: PEN/Jean Stein Book Award (finalist) for Bunk
- 2021: T. S. Eliot Prize (shortlist) for Stones
- 2024: Harvard Arts Medal
- 2026:Griffin Poetry Prize for Night Watch

== Bibliography ==
=== Poetry ===
Collections

- Young, Kevin (1995). Most Way Home. New York, NY: William Morrow. ISBN 978-0-6881-4032-8. OCLC 30544468.
- Young, Kevin (2001). To Repel Ghosts: Five Sides in B Minor. Cambridge, MA: Zoland Books. ISBN 978-1-5819-5033-5. OCLC 45466205.
- Young, Kevin (2003). Jelly Roll: A Blues. New York: Alfred A. Knopf. ISBN 978-0-3754-1460-2. OCLC 49737128.
- Young, Kevin (2005). To Repel Ghosts: Remixed from the Original Masters. New York, NY: Alfred A. Knopf. ISBN 978-0-3757-1023-0. OCLC 57722526.
- Young, Kevin (produced and directed by) (2005). Black Maria: Being the Adventures of Delilah Redbone & A.K.A. Jones: Poems. New York, NY: Alfred A. Knopf. ISBN 978-1-4000-4209-8. OCLC 55511276.
- Young, Kevin (2007). For the Confederate Dead: Poems. New York, NY: Alfred A. Knopf. ISBN 978-0-3072-6435-0. OCLC 69734632.
- Young, Kevin (2008). Dear Darkness: Poems. New York, NY: Alfred A. Knopf. ISBN 978-0-3072-6434-3. OCLC 196315701.
- Young, Kevin (2011). Ardency: A Chronicle of the Amistad Rebels. New York, NY: Alfred A. Knopf. ISBN 978-0-3072-6764-1. OCLC 635461180.
- Young, Kevin (2014). Book of Hours: Poems. Alfred A. Knopf Doubleday Publishing Group. ISBN 978-0-3072-7224-9. OCLC 844789963.
- Young, Kevin (2016). Blue Laws: Selected & Uncollected Poems, 1995-2015. New York, NY: Alfred A. Knopf. ISBN 978-0-3853-5150-8. OCLC 908838408.
- Young, Kevin (2018). Brown: Poems. New York, NY: Alfred A. Knopf. ISBN 978-1-5247-3255-4. OCLC 992437731.
- Young, Kevin (2021). Stones. London: Jonathan Cape Ltd. ISBN 1-78733-375-2. OCLC 1246285491.
- Young, Kevin (2 September 2025). Night Watch. New York: Random House. ISBN 978-0-593-31962-8.

Anthologies (edited)

- Young, Kevin, ed. (2003). Blues Poems. New York, NY: Alfred A. Knopf (Everyman's Library Pocket Poets). ISBN 978-0-3754-1458-9. OCLC 52312415.
- Berryman, John (2004). Young, Kevin (ed.). John Berryman: Selected Poems. New York, NY: Library of America. ISBN 978-1-9310-8269-3. OCLC 493664682.
- Young, Kevin, ed. (2006). Jazz Poems. London: Alfred A. Knopf (Everyman's Library Pocket Poets). ISBN 978-1-8415-9754-6. OCLC 988704157.
- Young, Kevin, ed. (2010). The Art of Losing: Poems of Grief and Healing. New York, NY: Bloomsbury. ISBN 978-1-6204-0484-3. OCLC 852253772.
- Young, Kevin, ed. (2012). The Hungry Ear: Poems of Food & Drink. New York, NY: Bloomsbury. ISBN 978-1-6081-9551-0. OCLC 778422545.
- Clifton, Lucille; Morrison, Toni (foreword by) (2012). Young, Kevin; Glaser, Michael S. (eds.). The Collected Poems of Lucille Clifton 1965-2010. ISBN 978-1-9426-8300-1. OCLC 912319753.

List of poems

Title	Year	First published	Reprinted/collected
Money Road	2016	Young, Kevin (22 February 2016). "Money Road". The New Yorker. 92 (2): 54.	

=== Non-fiction ===
- Young, Kevin (2017). Bunk: The Rise of Hoaxes, Humbug, Plagiarists, Phonies, Post-Facts, and Fake News. Minneapolis, MN: Graywolf Press. ISBN 978-1-5559-7791-7. OCLC 965739583.

=== Theses and dissertations ===
- Young, Kevin (1992). Most Way Home (Thesis/dissertation). Cambridge, MA: Harvard University. OCLC 26555488.
