= John Cena Classic =

WWE Raw television special

- The event's logo, featuring a cartoon illustration of John Cena
- Promotion: WWE
- Brand(s): Raw; SmackDown; NXT
- Date: December 14, 2026
- City: Kissimmee, Florida
- Venue: ESPN Wide World of Sports Complex

Raw special episodes chronology
← Previous; Raw in Mexico City special	Next → —

The John Cena Classic is an upcoming professional wrestling television special produced by WWE, to be held for wrestlers from the promotion's main roster brands, Raw and SmackDown, and developmental brand, NXT. It will be a special episode of WWE's weekly WWE Raw program and is set to take place on December 14, 2026, at the ESPN Wide World of Sports Complex within Walt Disney World in Kissimmee, Florida. It will stream live on the streaming service Netflix, and in a similar fashion to Saturday Night's Main Event XLII where Cena's final match was held, the event will feature matches between wrestlers from the main roster and wrestlers from NXT. The inaugural holder of the John Cena Classic Championship will also be crowned via fan vote on Club WWE, where all wrestlers who will compete at the event will be eligible regardless of the results of the matches.

== Production ==
=== Background ===
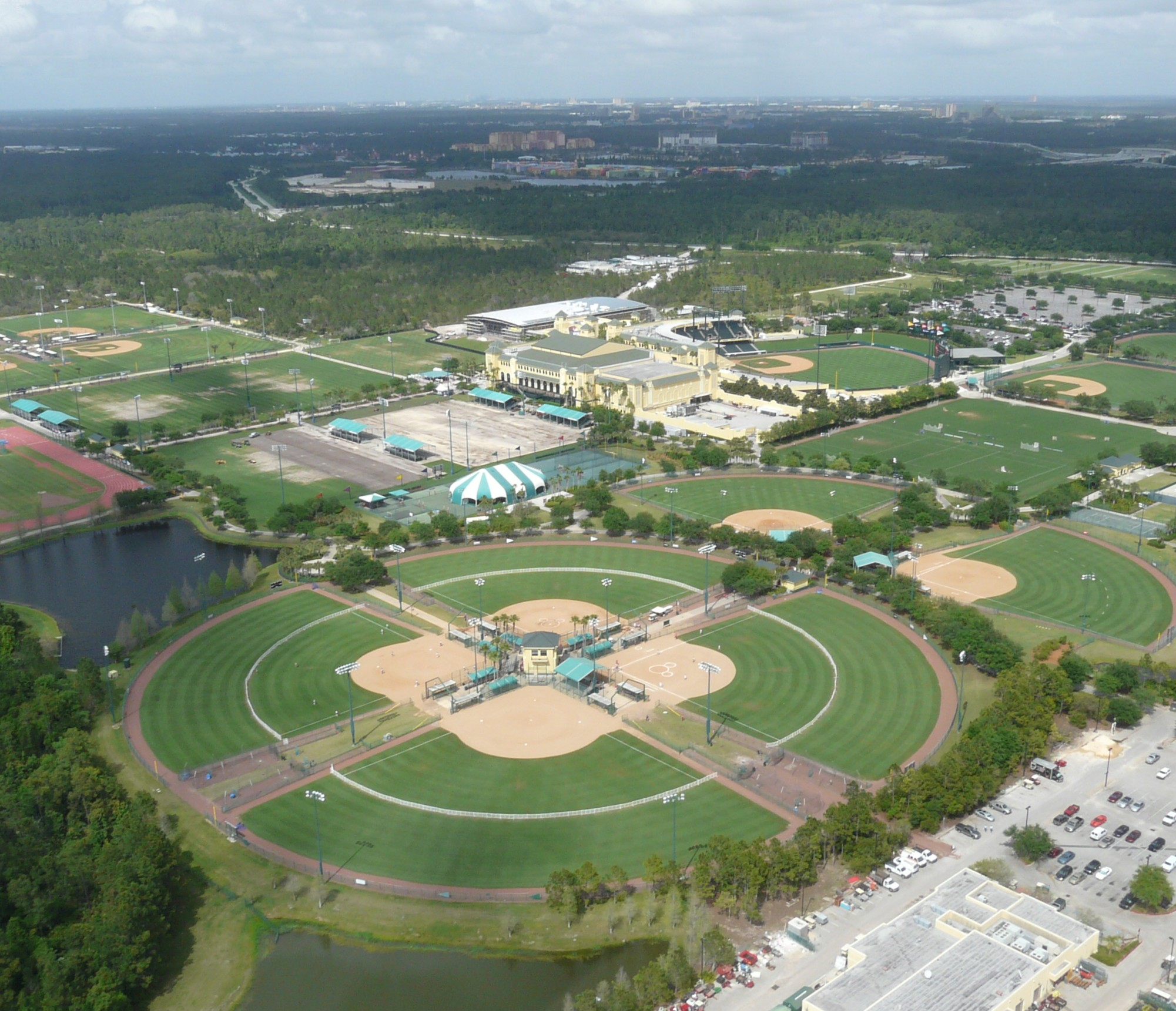
The John Cena Classic will take place at the ESPN Wide World of Sports Complex in Kissimmee, Florida.

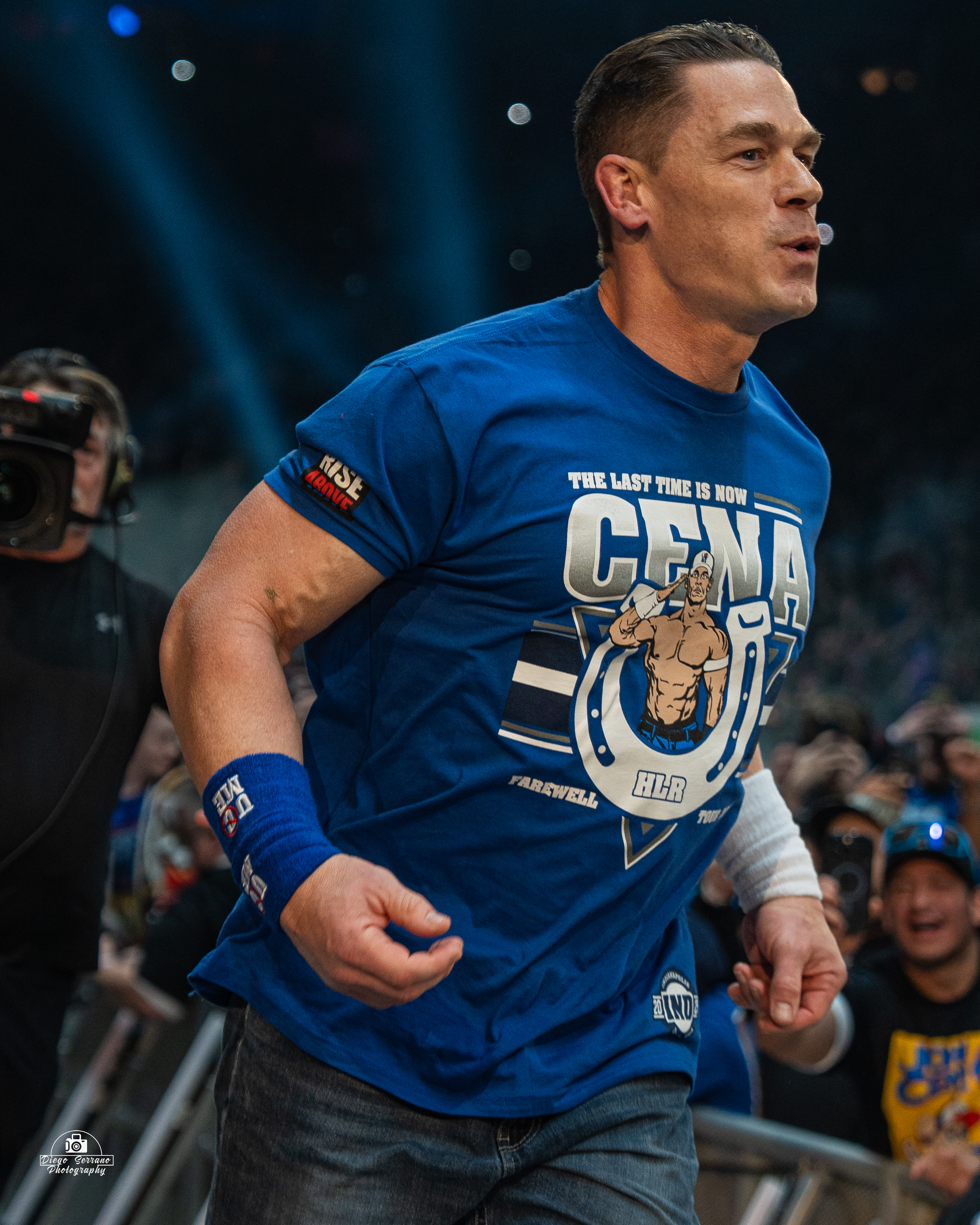
John Cena established the John Cena Classic.

At Saturday Night's Main Event on December 13, 2025, John Cena ended his 26-year professional wrestling career losing against Gunther. The event also featured exhibition matches that pitted wrestlers from WWE's main roster brands, Raw and SmackDown, against those from its developmental brand NXT, as well as one wrestler from Total Nonstop Action Wrestling (TNA), a decision by Cena to showcase up-and-coming talent.

At Backlash on May 9, 2026, Cena announced the John Cena Classic, an event that will feature wrestlers from the main roster and wrestlers from NXT. Cena also announced the John Cena Classic Championship; the inaugural champion will be decided via a fan vote, where anyone who competed at the event can be crowned the inaugural champion regardless of the results of the matches.

On the November 2 episode of Monday Night Raw, Cena announced that Monday, December 14, will feature two episodes of Raw: one taking place in Perth, Western Australia, Australia, and another serving as a television special for the John Cena Classic at the ESPN Wide World of Sports Complex in Kissimmee, Florida. Cena also announced that the inaugural holder of the John Cena Classic Championship will be decided via fan vote on Club WWE, an insider membership program launched by WWE. The John Cena Classic Championship belt was unveiled, which bears resemblance to the Spinner Belt that Cena introduced as a custom belt design for the WWE Championship in 2005 but would be used as the title's primary design until 2013. On November 9, Cena revealed to The Takedown on SI that the Classic will consist of a series of exhibition matches instead of a tournament bracket, and will culminate with both the Men's John Cena Classic Champion and Women's John Cena Classic Champion being crowned at the end of the night.

=== Storylines ===
The event will include matches that result from scripted storylines. Results will be predetermined by WWE's writers on the Raw, SmackDown, and NXT brands, while storylines are produced on WWE's weekly television shows, Raw, Friday Night SmackDown, and Tuesday night's NXT.

Cena will make his final appearance Survivor Series on November 28 in Houston, Texas, a month prior to the Classic taking place.

== Participants ==
Male participants
Wrestler	Brand	Announced
Cody Rhodes	SmackDown	November 2, 2026
Zilla Fatu	NXT	November 4, 2026
Noam Dar	NXT	November 10, 2026
Romeo Moreno	NXT	November 10, 2026
Shiloh Hill	NXT	November 17, 2026

Female participants
Wrestler	Brand	Announced
Kelani Jordan	NXT	November 10, 2026
Charlotte Flair	SmackDown	November 13, 2026
Jacy Jayne	SmackDown	November 13, 2026
Fallon Henley	SmackDown	November 13, 2026
Lainey Reid	SmackDown	November 13, 2026
Liv Morgan	Raw	November 16, 2026
Izzi Dame	NXT	November 17, 2026
