= Jelly bean (disambiguation) =

A jelly bean is a type of confectionery.

Jelly bean or Jellybean may also refer to:

== Arts, entertainment, and media ==
- Assorted Jelly Beans, American punk rock group
- The Jelly Beans, American vocal group
- "The Jelly-bean" (1920), short story of Francis Scott Fitzgerald

== Biology ==
- Jelly bean palm or Synechanthus, a genus of flowering plant in the palm family
- Jelly bean plant or Sedum rubrotinctum, a succulent plant from the family Crassulaceae
- Jellybean tetra or Ladigesia roloffi, a species of African tetra
- Jellybean tetra or Adonis tetra (Lepidarchus adonis), a very small African fish of the family Alestidae

== People ==
- Jellybean Johnson (1956–2025), an American musician and member of The Time
- Joe "Jellybean" Bryant (1954–2024), an American basketball player and coach
- John "Jellybean" Benitez (born 1957), an American musician, producer and DJ, often credited simply as Jellybean
- The "Jelly bean lady", Loretta Marron (born 1951), the CEO of Friends of Science in Medicine

== Other uses ==
- Android Jelly Bean, codename for versions 4.1–4.3 of the Android operating system
- Jellybean Jones, a member of the Jones family in the Archies Gang comics
- In the electronics industry, a "jelly bean" component is one which is widely available, used generically in many applications, and has no very unusual characteristics. For example, the μA741 might be considered a jelly bean operational amplifier.

== See also ==
- Jelly roll (disambiguation)
