= Club WWE =

WWE subscription service

- Logo used since 2026
- Website type: Subscription service
- Available in: English
- Country of origin: United States
- Area served: United States
- Parent: TKO Group Holdings
- Registration: Monthly/yearly subscription required to access content
- Launched: July 31, 2026; 3 months ago
- Current status: Active

Club WWE is a subscription service jointly owned by American professional wrestling promotion World Wrestling Entertainment (WWE) and its parent company, TKO Group Holdings.

== History ==
On March 27, 2026, WWE filed to trademark the term "Club WWE" with the United States Patent and Trademark Office (USPTO), with the filing making reference to "membership club services". On the same night's episode of Friday Night SmackDown, a visual teaser and logos were shown, and later saw an individual hold a sign with the branding in view of the hard camera. A QR code teaser aired on the April 10 episode of SmackDown. Four days later, on the April 14 episode of Monday Night Raw, a commercial narrated by John Cena confirmed the program to be a membership service. Club WWE formally launched in the United States on July 31, 2026. As of November 2026, it is only available within the U.S. and is unavailable in other territories.

=== Pricing ===
The service consists of two pricing plans. Subscribers can either pay US$8.25 monthly or $99 annually, with annual subscribers being defined as "Gold members". Perks available to gold members include access to a members-only forum, early access to ticket pre-sales and merchandise drops. In addition, one of its in-person perks is admission to exclusive VIP areas at select events, as was first made the case at the WWE World at WrestleMania experience ahead of WrestleMania 42, which had its own lounge area.

=== Paywalled video content ===
The service hosts video content behind a paywall, including behind the scenes clips, exclusive interviews, matches from the WWE Archive, and original programming. In September 2026, a notable house show title match that saw Stephanie Vaquer defeat Liv Morgan in Chile to become the new Women's World Champion was uploaded to the platform in full, exclusively for subscribers. Later that month, four episodes of Raw ranging from 2009 to 2016 were made available as a new subscription perk, with these described as "exclusive" to the service, as they are not available on Netflix's back catalog of Raw episodes in the Raw Vault.

=== Fan voting ===
On September 10, 2026, Club WWE launched its first subscriber-only fan voting campaign. It saw them choose which wrestler they want to become a cover athlete for an unspecified edition of WWE 2K27, from a preselected list of seven singles competitors; Bron Breakker, Je'Von Evans, Oba Femi, Penta, Sol Ruca, Stephanie Vaquer, and Trick Williams, and one stable; Fatal Influence, which consists of Jacy Jayne, Fallon Henley, and Lainey Reid, with the reveal scheduled for early 2027.

In November, John Cena revealed the John Cena Classic's inaugural men's and women's champions will be determined by fan votes that have been cast by its subscribers, irrespective of the match results.

== Criticism ==
When its launch announcement was made in April 2026, Tony Maglio of The Hollywood Reporter wrote that it had came at the same time fans had criticized TKO for the "outrageous" ticket pricing for WWE events, with professional wrestling podcaster Duke Bennett hailing it as "remarkably aggressive". In October 2026, it was reported that WWE had "numerous" complaints with the rollout of the service and its founder's package.

== See also ==
- WWE
- TKO Group Holdings
- WWE Universe
