= Jelly roll =

Jelly roll often refers to:

- Swiss roll, a cake also known as jelly roll, roll cake, cream roll, roulade, or Swiss log
- Sheet pan, a baking pan sometimes referred to as a "jelly roll pan"

Jelly roll may also refer to:

== Entertainment ==
- Jelly Roll (singer) (born 1984), rapper and country musician from Nashville
- Jelly Roll Morton (1890–1941), jazz musician
- "Jelly Roll Blues", a 1924 jazz fox-trot composed by Jelly Roll Morton
- "Jelly Roll", a song on the album Blue Murder by Blue Murder
- "Jelly Roll", a composition on the album Mingus Ah Um by Charles Mingus
- Jelly Roll, a character in the 1975 movie A Genius, Two Partners and a Dupe
- Jelly Roll, the pet dog on the children's television show Jibber Jabber
- Jelly Roll (poetry collection), a 2003 poetry collection by Kevin Young

== Finance ==
- Jelly roll (options), an options trading strategy

== Science and technology ==
- Jelly roll fold, a type of beta barrel protein domain structure
- Jelly roll (battery), a type of battery construction

== See also ==
- Jelly bean (disambiguation)
