= Bunk (book) =

2017 book by Kevin Young

Bunk: The Rise of Hoaxes, Humbug, Plagiarists, Phonies, Post-Facts, and Fake News
- Author: Kevin Young
- Language: English
- Subject: Fake news; hoaxes
- Publisher: Graywolf Press
- Publication date: November 14, 2017
- Pages: 480
- ISBN: 978-1-55597-791-7

Bunk: The Rise of Hoaxes, Humbug, Plagiarists, Phonies, Post-Facts, and Fake News is a 2017 book by Kevin Young that examines the history of hoaxes and fake news.

== Reception ==
Writing in the Los Angeles Times, Colin Dickey found the book "a wild, incisive, exhilarating tour". While complementing the research that had gone into the book, Annalisa Quinn—in a review published by NPR—found that Young's "knotted, clotted style" frustrating.
