= The Grey Album (book) =

2012 book of cultural criticism by Kevin Young

The Grey Album: On the Blackness of Blackness
- Author: Kevin Young
- Language: English
- Publisher: Graywolf Press
- Publication date: March 13, 2012
- Pages: 476
- ISBN: 978-1555976071

The Grey Album: On the Blackness of Blackness is a 2012 collection of essays in cultural criticism by Kevin Young. The book was a finalist for the National Book Critics Circle Award in Criticism.

The Grey Album places the figure of the trickster near the center of African-American (and thus, American) literary history. Young traces this lineage from Phillis Wheatley through Jay-Z, arguing that the act of lying—the counterfeit, or what Young calls "storying"—forms an essential genre of self-invention in the African-American literary and musical tradition. As David Shields notes in his New York Times review, Young rejects white critics' preoccupation with "authenticity", saying such criticism fails even before it begins to engage the work:

[W]hite critics who read slave narratives "simply in terms of authenticity do two quite damaging things: first, they read (white) skepticism back into the slave's writing and thus limit the 'freedom' of black authorship; second, they ignore or downplay the African-American trickster tradition, itself related to black rhetorical strategies like lying." It is not just creation per se but specifically creation of the counterfeit that "provides a means of black acquisition of authority (even as so-called authenticity is called into question)."

Young writes that "counterfeit is the way in which black folks forge—both 'create' and 'fake'—black authority in a world not necessarily of their making."
