= WWE Raw in Mexico City special =

Professional wrestling television special

- Promotional poster featuring Roman Reigns and various Mexican professional wrestlers
- Promotion: WWE
- Brand: Raw
- Date: September 14, 2026
- City: Mexico City, Mexico
- Venue: Arena CDMX
- Attendance: 18,255

Raw special episodes chronology
← Previous; Raw on Netflix Anniversary Show	Next → John Cena Classic

The Monday Night Raw in Mexico City special was an American professional wrestling television special that was produced by WWE. The program was broadcast on the streaming service Netflix. It took place on September 14, 2026, from Arena CDMX in Mexico City, Mexico, and featured performers from the Raw brand. It also featured the main roster debut of Lola Vice.

This episode was the main fallout of Triplemanía 34. In the main event, Roman Reigns defeated Penta, who won an eight-man single-elimination tournament that was open to luchadores from the Lucha Libre AAA Worldwide (AAA), Raw, and SmackDown rosters, to retain his World Heavyweight Championship. In other matches contested, Chad Gable defeated Dragon Lee to retain his WWE Intercontinental Championship, Je'Von Evans defeated Big Cass and Austin Theory in a triple threat match to determine the #2 spot for the men's Money in the Bank ladder match, Lola Vice defeated Raquel Rodriguez and Kelani Jordan in a triple threat match to determine the #2 spot for the women's Money in the Bank ladder match, and in the opening contest, El Grande Americano and Stephanie Vaquer defeated The Judgment Day (Dominik Mysterio and Liv Morgan) by disqualification. The episode also saw the signing of NXT's Lola Vice to the Raw brand.

== Production ==
=== Background ===
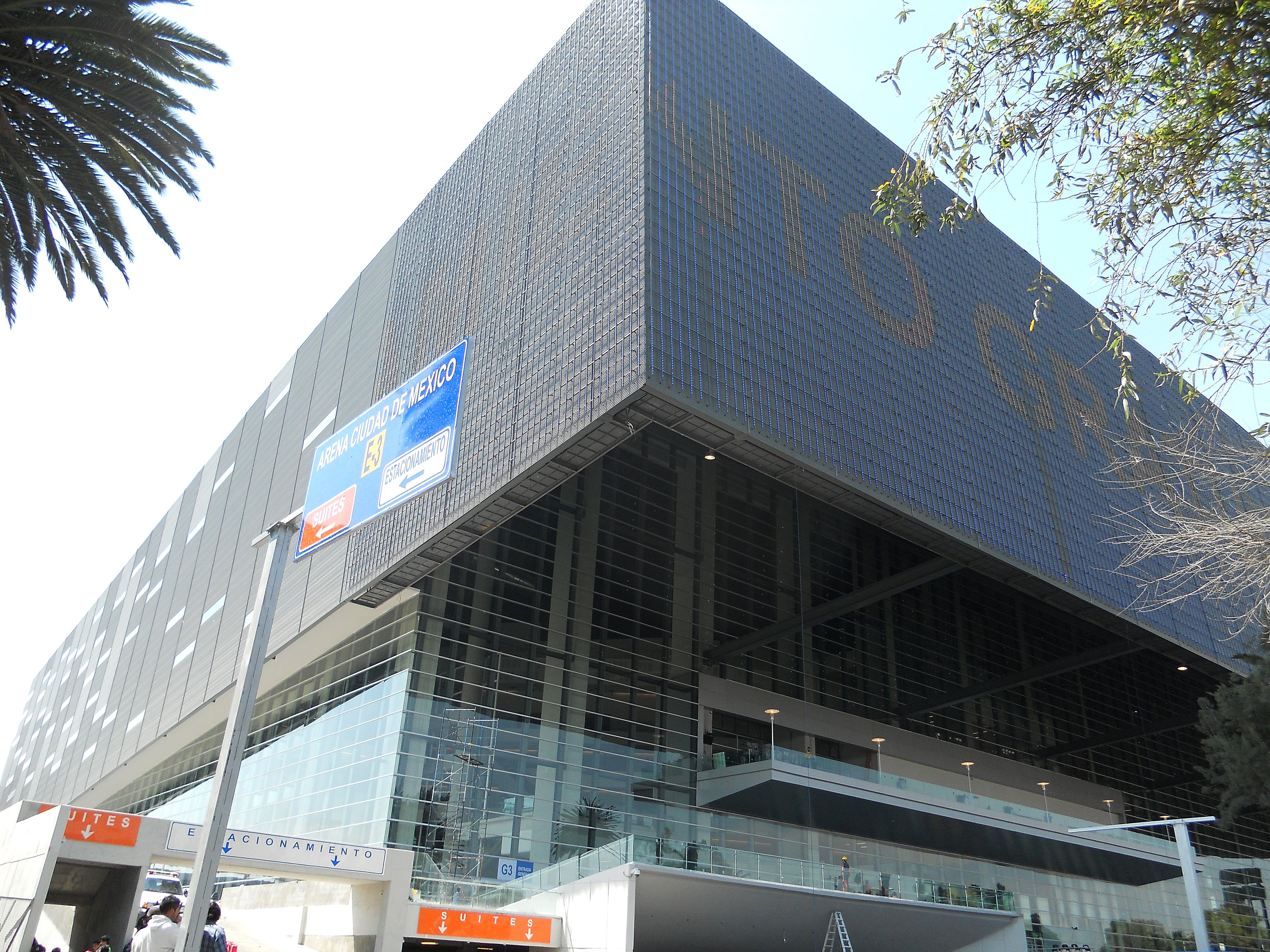
The event took place at Arena CDMX in Mexico City.

On June 1, 2026, WWE issued a press release through their corporate website announcing that they, and Lucha Libre AAA Worldwide (AAA), would be heading on a live tour of Mexico in September. The tour commenced with two house shows in Guadalajara on September 9 and Monterrey on September 10, and continue in Mexico City, where the Arena CDMX hosted an episode of Friday Night SmackDown on September 11, the second night of the two-night event Triplemanía 34 on September 13, and concluded with an episode of Monday Night Raw on September 14.

The special marked the second episode of Raw to be broadcast live from Mexico. The first was a Raw SuperShow on October 17, 2011, held at Mexico City's Palacio de los Deportes arena.

=== Storylines ===
The event included matches that resulted from scripted storylines. Results were predetermined by WWE's writers on the Raw brand, while storylines are produced on WWE's weekly television show Raw.

At the end of the August 3 episode of Raw, World Heavyweight Champion Roman Reigns headed backstage, where he met with Rey Mysterio, the on-screen General Manager of AAA, after Mysterio approached Reigns with a proposition and told him "let me run something by you", as the two walked away to close the show. Two days later, in a video shared by WWE on X, Mysterio revealed a tournament exclusively featuring luchadors would be held and that Reigns had agreed to defend his championship against the winner in Mexico City on the September 14 episode of Raw. On August 7, hours before that night's episode of SmackDown, the eight-man tournament bracket was shared on social media, showing that qualifying matches would be contested on three episodes of Raw and one episode of AAA on Fox. Dragon Lee, El Fiscal, El Hijo de Dr. Wagner Jr., La Parka, Laredo Kid, Penta, Psycho Clown, and Rey Fénix were all named as competitors. Penta won the tournament by defeating his brother Rey Fénix in the final, which was taped on August 28, but aired on tape delay on August 31, 2026.

At Night 2 of SummerSlam on August 2, Chad Gable became the new WWE Intercontinental Champion after successfully defeating Penta. On the August 31 episode of Raw, Gable cut a promo in which he stated his "real work starts now" and that he would not be a champion without the people of Mexico, before announcing Raw is returning to the country and he would defend his championship at the special. He subsequently invited Dragon Lee to the ring to tell him he had selected him as his opponent, as Raw General Manager Adam Pearce had allowed him to choose who he wanted to face. The two were interrupted by Ethan Page, which prompted Gable to call for a referee to officiate a number one contender's qualifying match between Lee and Page. Lee won the match after Page's heel exposed turnbuckle spot backfired, resulting in Lee remaining as Gable's opponent.

During the September 7 episode of Raw, WWE announced that two Money in the Bank Triple Threat Qualifying matches would happen of the show, with the men’s one between Big Cass, Je'Von Evans and Austin Theory, and the women’s one with Lola Vice and NXT Women's Champion Kelani Jordan, both of whom made their main roster debuts, and Raquel Rodriguez.

== Results ==
No.	Results	Stipulations	Times
1	El Grande Americano and Stephanie Vaquer defeated The Judgment Day (Dominik Mysterio and Liv Morgan) by disqualification	Mixed tag team match	13:23
2	Je'Von Evans defeated Big Cass and Austin Theory by pinfall	Triple threat Men’s Money in the Bank qualifying match.	9:43
3	Chad Gable (c) defeated Dragon Lee by submission	Singles match for the WWE Intercontinental Championship	15:39
4	Lola Vice defeated Kelani Jordan and Raquel Rodriguez by pinfall	Triple threat Women's Money in the Bank qualifying match.	10:10
5	Roman Reigns (c) defeated Penta by pinfall	Singles match for the World Heavyweight Championship	22:25
(c) / – the champion(s) heading into the match

=== World Heavyweight Championship No. 1 Contender's Tournament ===
First round Raw; August 10–17, 2026; Lucha Libre AAA; August 15, 2026
Raw	Penta	Pinfall
AAA	Laredo Kid	10:40
AAA	Psycho Clown	9:06
AAA	La Parka	Pinfall
Raw	Dragon Lee	Pinfall
AAA	El Hijo de Dr. Wagner Jr.	11:05
SmackDown	Rey Fénix	Pinfall
AAA	El Fiscal	9:05

Semifinals; Raw; August 24, 2026
Raw	Penta	Pinfall
AAA	La Parka	8:55
Raw	Dragon Lee	13:40
SmackDown	Rey Fénix	Pinfall

Final; Raw; August 28, 2026 (aired: August 31)
Raw	Penta	Pinfall
SmackDown	Rey Fénix	19:10
