= Jelly Roll (poetry collection) =

Poetry collection

Jelly Roll: A Blues
- Author: Kevin Young
- Language: English
- Genre: Poetry
- Publisher: Knopf
- Publication date: January 1, 2003
- Media type: Book
- Pages: 208
- Awards: Finalist, National Book Award
- ISBN: 978-0-375-41460-2

Jelly Roll: A Blues is a 2003 poetry collection by Kevin Young.

The 208-page book – Young's third – is named for jazz musician Jelly Roll Morton and develops a blues-based collection of love poems, written predominantly in two-line stanzas. In 2003, it was a National Book Award finalist and a Los Angeles Times Book Prize finalist. At Flavorwire, Jonathon Sturgeon described Jelly Roll as "one of several unimpeachably great books by Young...a poetic proof of the limitless emotional range of blues music and its embeddedness in the American imaginarium." It received a starred review in Publishers Weekly, which noted, “Young has daringly likened himself in earlier poems and prose to Langston Hughes: this versatile lyric tour de force may well justify the ambitious comparison.”
