= Raymond Danowski Poetry Library =

Coordinates: 33°47′25″N 84°19′32″W

The Raymond Danowski Poetry Library is a collection of modern and contemporary poetry held in the Stuart A. Rose Manuscript, Archives, and Rare Book Library at Emory University in Atlanta, Georgia, U.S..

== History ==
It was established in 2004 after Raymond Danowski, the son-in-law of sculptor Henry Moore, donated his collection of "75,000 volumes of verse, believed to be the largest private library of 20th-century poetry in English," to the university. As of 2024, the library holds approximately 85,000 volumes.
