= ID Showcase =

Professional wrestling event

- Created by: WWE
- Promotions: WWE (WWE ID) (2025-present); New York Wrestling Connection (2025); Game Changer Wrestling (2025); WWNLive (2025-present); Future Stars of Wrestling (2025-present); Beyond Wrestling (2026-present); Nightmare Factory (2026-present)
- First event: NYWC ID Showcase

The ID Showcase is a professional wrestling event promoted by WWE under their Independent Development program which was first staged in 2025 and most recently in 2026.

== History ==
In June 2024, WWE trademarked WWE ID and WWE Independent Development with the purpose of organizing and conducting a program to help develop wrestlers. That October, WWE ID was officially announced, which would support the development of independent wrestlers at specified schools or promotions and provide them a pathway to the promotion. The first schools and promotions designated under WWE ID were Reality of Wrestling (run by Booker T), Black and Brave Academy (run by Seth Rollins and Marek Brave), Nightmare Factory (run by Cody Rhodes), Elite Pro Wrestling Training Center, and KnokX Pro Academy (run by Rikishi). On November 9, Fightful reported that Timothy Thatcher had been signed as the WWE ID trainer. In addition to Thatcher, it was later reported by Yahoo! Entertainment that Sean Waltman had been hired as an ID trainer.

On February 1, 2025, during the 2025 Royal Rumble, WWE announced the launch of WWE Evolve, a Tubi program based on the defunct independent Evolve promotion ran by WWE ID co-founder Gabe Sapolsky. The program, which premiered on March 5, 2025, features both WWE ID prospects and Performance Center trainees. On February 18, WWE chief content officer Paul "Triple H" Levesque announced the creation of the WWE ID Championship and Women's ID Championship – the championships are defended in WWE and on the independent circuit. On August 1, during SummerSlam weekend, independent wrestling promotion Game Changer Wrestling held their WWE ID Showcase event at The Williams Center in Rutherford, New Jersey, which saw Cappuccino Jones taking on Jack Cartwheel in the finals for the WWE ID Championship tournament and ID Champion and Kylie Rae taking on Zara Zakher and Zayda Steel in the finals for the WWE Women's ID Championship tournament.

== Events ==
Date	Event name	Promotion	Venue	Location	Main event	Ref
June 8, 2025	NYWC ID Showcase	NYWC	NYWC Sportatorium	Deer Park, New York	Jackson Drake vs. Aaron Rourke	
July 19, 2025	WWNLive x HOC ID Showcase	WWNLive; HOC	House of Champions Pro Wrestling Training Center	Longwood, Florida	Jackson Drake (c) vs. Timothy Thatcher for the WWE Evolve Championship	
August 1, 2025	GCW ID Showcase	GCW	Williams Center	Rutherford, New Jersey	Cappuccino Jones vs. Jack Cartwheel in a WWE ID Championship Tournament final match	
January 10, 2026	WWNLive x HOC ID Showcase: Battle of Champions	WWNLive; HOC	House of Champions Pro Wrestling Training Center	Longwood, Florida	Jackson Drake (c) vs. Jha'Quan McNair for the WWE Evolve Championship	
April 16, 2026	FSW ID Showcase	FSW	HyperX Arena	Paradise, Nevada	Aaron Rourke (c) vs. Cappuccino Jones for the WWE Evolve Championship	
May 15, 2026	Beyond ID Showcase	Beyond Wrestling	White Eagle Pub	Worcester, Massachusetts	Aaron Rourke (c) vs. Mike Cunningham for the WWE Evolve Championship	
June 26, 2026	Nightmare Factory ID Showcase	Nightmare Factory	Atlanta West Business Center	Atlanta, Georgia	Chazz "Starboy" Hall (c) vs. Max Abrams (c) in a title-for-title match for the WWE ID Championship and the Nightmare Factory Championship	
August 7, 2026	ROW ID Showcase	ROW	Walker Texas Lawyer Arena	Texas City, Texas	House Money (AJ Francis, Josiah Jean, and Quentin Wynter) vs. The Mog Squad (CJ Valor, Jacari Ball, and Santi Rivera) in a six-man tag team match	
September 9, 2026 (Pretaped)	Evolve: ID Showcase Special	WWE Evolve	WWE Performance Center	Orlando, Florida	The Mog Squad (CJ Valor, Jacari Ball, Max Abrams, and Santi Rivera) vs. WWE ID 1.0 (Aaron Rourke, Cappuccino Jones, Marcus Mathers, and Sam Holloway) in a team gauntlet match.	
(c) – refers to the champion(s) heading into the match
