= WWNLive x HOC ID Showcase =

2025 WWE ID, House of Champions, and WWNLive event

- Promotion(s): WWE (WWE ID); WWNLive; House of Champions
- Date: July 19, 2025
- City: Longwood, Florida
- Venue: House of Champions Pro Wrestling Training Center

WWE ID event chronology
← Previous; NYWC ID Showcase	Next → GCW ID Showcase

WWNLive x HOC ID Showcase was a professional wrestling livestreaming event produced by WWNLive and House of Champions in association with WWE's Independent Development program. The show took place on July 19, 2025 at the House of Champions Pro Wrestling Training Center in Longwood, Florida and was streamed live on YouTube. Quarter-final and semi-final matches for the WWE ID Championship tournament were also contested on this show as well.

== Production ==
=== Background ===
During a press conference on February 18, 2025, WWE's Chief Content Officer, Paul "Triple H" Levesque, unveiled men's and women's WWE ID Championships. The titles were designed to be defended exclusively across the independent circuit, offering emerging talent increased exposure and opportunities. The inaugural champions were determined through a tournament featuring top prospects from the WWE ID program. The tournament matches were scheduled to take place at various independent wrestling shows, highlighting WWE's collaboration with the independent wrestling scene. Participants of the inaugural tournament were all WWE ID prospects, and first round matches were held by Game Changer Wrestling (GCW) on April 16 and Future Stars of Wrestling on April 18 during WrestleMania 41 week. It was then confirmed that after the crowning of the inaugural champions, all independent wrestlers would be eligible to challenge for the ID Championships and that if a non-WWE ID wrestler were to win either title, they would receive a WWE ID contract. On July 16, 2025, WWNLive announced that they would be streaming their ID Showcase on YouTube.

=== Storylines ===
WWNLive x HOC ID Showcase featured professional wrestling matches that involves different wrestlers from pre-existing scripted feuds and storylines. Wrestlers portrayed villains, heroes, or less distinguishable characters in scripted events that built tension and culminated in a wrestling match or series of matches. Storylines were produced on WWE Evolve, WWNLive events and their weekly show WWN Proving Ground, and various events on the independent circuit.

== Results ==
Other on-screen personnel
Role:	Name:
Commentators	Trevin Adams
Commentators	Sean Legacy
Commentators	Jackson Drake
Commentators	Bryce Donovan

No.	Results	Stipulations	Times
1	Jack Cartwheel defeated Sean Legacy	WWE ID Championship Tournament quarter-final match	7:19
2	Cappuccino Jones defeated Bryce Donovan	WWE ID Championship Tournament quarter-final match	8:01
3	Brandon Groom defeated Matthew Ennis, Onix Caballero, Papi D	Four way match	3:49
4	Jamie Stanley defeated GMJ	Singles match	5:34
5	Ricky Smokes defeated Eli Knight	Singles match	10:23
6	Aaron Roberts defeated It's GAL	Singles match	6:02
7	Zayda Steel defeated Izzy Moreno	Singles match	5:09
8	KC Rocker defeated Adam Riggs	Singles match	2:28
9	Jack Cartwheel defeated Brad Baylor	WWE ID Championship Tournament semi-final match	8:22
10	Cappuccino Jones defeated Ice Williams	WWE ID Championship Tournament semi-final match	12:51
11	Jackson Drake (with Brad Baylor, Bryce Donovan, Ricky Smokes, and Zayda Steel) (c) defeated Timothy Thatcher	Singles match for the WWE Evolve Championship	13:56
(c) / – the champion(s) heading into the match
