= NYWC ID Showcase =

2025 WWE ID and New York Wrestling Connection event

- Promotion(s): WWE (WWE ID); New York Wrestling Connection
- Date: June 8, 2025
- City: Deer Park, New York
- Venue: NYWC Sportatorium

WWE ID event chronology
← Previous; First	Next → WWNLive x HOC ID Showcase

NYWC Presents The ID Showcase was a professional wrestling livestreaming event produced by New York Wrestling Connection (NYWC) in partnership with WWE's Independent Development program. The show took place on June 8, 2025 at the NYWC Sportatorium in Deer Park, New York and was streamed live on IndependentWrestling.tv.

== Production ==
=== Background ===
In October 2024, the American professional wrestling company WWE introduced the Independent Development (ID) program, similar to their Next in Line (NIL) program for college athletes, with ID to support the development of independent wrestlers by collaborating with various wrestling schools and promotions on the independent circuit. The inaugural partner promotions and schools confirmed were Reality of Wrestling, Black and Brave Academy, Nightmare Factory, Elite Pro Wrestling Training Center, and KnokX Pro Academy.

During a press conference on February 18, 2025, WWE's Chief Content Officer, Paul "Triple H" Levesque, unveiled men's and women's WWE ID Championships. The titles were designed to be defended exclusively across the independent circuit, offering emerging talent increased exposure and opportunities. The inaugural champions were determined through a tournament featuring top prospects from the WWE ID program. The tournament matches were scheduled to take place at various independent wrestling shows, highlighting WWE's collaboration with the independent wrestling scene. Participants of the inaugural tournament were all WWE ID prospects, and first round matches were held by Game Changer Wrestling (GCW) on April 16 and Future Stars of Wrestling on April 18 during WrestleMania 41 week. It was then confirmed that after the crowning of the inaugural champions, all independent wrestlers would be eligible to challenge for the ID Championships and that if a non-WWE ID wrestler were to win either title, they would receive a WWE ID contract.

=== Storylines ===
NYWC Presents The ID Showcase featured professional wrestling matches that involves different wrestlers from pre-existing scripted feuds and storylines. Wrestlers portrayed villains, heroes, or less distinguishable characters in scripted events that built tension and culminated in a wrestling match or series of matches. Storylines were produced on WWE Evolve, New York Wrestling Connection events, and various events on the independent circuit.

== Results ==
No.	Results	Stipulations	Times
1	Michael Mistretta defeated Bobby Orlando	Singles match	5:13
2	Anthony Gangone, Christian Darling, and Kay Blazer defeated Brando Lee, Georgio Lawrence, and Mike Datello	Six-man tag team match	5:32
3	Zayda Steel defeated Amity LaVey	Singles match	4:38
4	Bryce Donovan defeated Jordan Oasis	WWE ID Championship Tournament match	13:20
5	Ice Williams defeated It's GAL	WWE ID Championship Tournament match	9:20
6	Marcus Mathers defeated Jack Cartwheel	Singles match	9:41
7	Jack Cartwheel defeated Aaron Roberts by pinfall	WWE ID Championship Tournament match	6:07
8	Cappuccino Jones defeated Ricky Smokes	WWE ID Championship Tournament match	6:51
9	Brad Baylor defeated Sean Legacy	WWE ID Championship Tournament match	5:22
10	Timothy Thatcher defeated Sam Holloway	Singles match	10:46
11	Zara Zakher defeated Kylie Rae	Singles match	12:52
12	Jackson Drake defeated Aaron Rourke	Singles match	20:56
