= GCW ID Showcase =

2025 WWE ID and Game Changer Wrestling event

GCW Presents The ID Showcase
- Promotional poster of the event
- Promotion(s): WWE (WWE ID); Game Changer Wrestling
- Date: August 1, 2025
- City: Rutherford, New Jersey
- Venue: Williams Center

Game Changer Wrestling event chronology
← Previous; GCW Japan	Next → Hit 'Em Up

WWE ID event chronology
← Previous; WWNLive x HOC ID Showcase	Next → WFA ID Showcase

GCW Presents The ID Showcase was a professional wrestling pay-per-view event produced by Game Changer Wrestling (GCW) in partnership with WWE's Independent Development program. The event took place on August 1, 2025 at the Williams Center in Rutherford, New Jersey, was aired live on Triller TV, and featured the finals for the WWE ID Championship and WWE Women's ID Championship tournaments.

== Production ==
=== Background ===
During a press conference on February 18, 2025, WWE's Chief Content Officer, Paul "Triple H" Levesque, unveiled men's and women's WWE ID Championships. The titles were designed to be defended exclusively across the independent circuit, offering emerging talent increased exposure and opportunities. The inaugural champions were determined through a tournament featuring top prospects from the WWE ID program. The tournament matches were scheduled to take place at various independent wrestling shows, highlighting WWE's collaboration with the independent wrestling scene. Participants of the inaugural tournament were all WWE ID prospects, and first round matches were held by Game Changer Wrestling (GCW) on April 16 and Future Stars of Wrestling on April 18 during WrestleMania 41 week. It was then confirmed that after the crowning of the inaugural champions, all independent wrestlers would be eligible to challenge for the ID Championships and that if a non-WWE ID wrestler were to win either title, they would receive a WWE ID contract.

The men's tournament format was contested as a double-elimination tournament. On July 8, 2025, it was announced that the tournament final would be held at GCW's event, The ID Showcase, on August 1, 2025 during SummerSlam week. On July 22, 2025, WWE and GCW announced that WWE Evolve Champion Jackson Drake would fight Jordan Oasis in a non-title match at the event.

=== Storylines ===
GCW Presents The ID Showcase featured professional wrestling matches that involves different wrestlers from pre-existing scripted feuds and storylines. Wrestlers portrayed villains, heroes, or less distinguishable characters in scripted events that built tension and culminated in a wrestling match or series of matches. Storylines were produced on WWE Evolve, Game Changer Wrestling events, and various events on the independent circuit.

== Results ==
Other on-screen personnel
Role:	Name:
Commentators	Veda Scott
Commentators	Emil Jay
Ring announcers	Emil Jay

No.	Results	Stipulations	Times
1	Ice Williams defeated Bobby Orlando by pinfall	Singles match	9:24
2	The Vanity Project (Brad Baylor, Bryce Donovan, and Ricky Smokes) defeated Marcus Mathers and YDNP (Alec Price and Jordan Oliver)	Six man tag team match	16:28
3	Jackson Drake defeated Alec Price	Singles match	4:19
4	It's GAL defeated Aaron Roberts	Grudge match	6:11
5	Timothy Thatcher defeated Aaron Rourke by pinfall	Singles match	18:10
6	Kylie Rae defeated Zara Zakher and Zayda Steel (with Brad Baylor, Bryce Donovan, Jackson Drake, and Ricky Smokes) by pinfall	WWE Women's ID Championship Tournament final three way match	9:23
7	Cappuccino Jones defeated Jack Cartwheel	WWE ID Championship Tournament final match	19:27
