= List of current champions in WWE =

WWE is an American professional wrestling promotion based in Stamford, Connecticut, and the world's largest promotion. As with other professional wrestling promotions, WWE promotes several championships, with titleholders typically determined via the results of professional wrestling matches within scripted storylines. On rare occasions, a championship may be awarded to or stripped from a wrestler outside of a match, though these occurrences typically also fall within scripted storylines. (Note: In some cases, a wrestler may be stripped of a title due to a legitimate injury or other real-world circumstance. On such occasions, the storyline may be adapted around real-world events or may continue without referencing them.)

WWE currently divides its roster between four brands, and there is also a non-exclusive developmental program. Most wrestlers perform exclusively on a single brand (with select exemptions). WWE's two primary brands are Raw and SmackDown, collectively referred to as the main roster. NXT serves as the primary developmental brand (although it was considered a third main brand from 2019 to 2021), with Evolve geared towards WWE Performance Center trainees, while WWE ID is to support wrestlers on the independent circuit. WWE also acquired the Mexican promotion Lucha Libre AAA Worldwide (AAA) in 2025, but it primarily operates as a separate promotion with occasional crossover; its titles can be found on the AAA list, with one exception (in next paragraph).

There are currently 21 championships in WWE divided across Raw, SmackDown, NXT, Evolve, and WWE ID. Raw, SmackDown, and NXT each have a primary, secondary, and tag team championship for male wrestlers and a primary and secondary championship for female wrestlers. There are two championships open to multiple brands: a women's tag team championship, which is shared between Raw, SmackDown, and NXT, and a men's cruiserweight championship which is open to all brands, including WWE's Mexican sister promotion AAA from where the title originates. Evolve and WWE ID each feature one primary singles championship for their respective men's and women's divisions.

As of November 18, 2026, among the four current brands and the non-exclusive developmental program, 25 wrestlers officially hold championships. This list includes the number of times the wrestler has held the title, the date and location of the win, and a description of the match victory.

== Overview ==
The American professional wrestling promotion WWE promotes a large roster of professional wrestlers. In 2002, the brand extension was introduced, dividing the roster into what the company refers to as brands with each brand having its own set of championships; the brand split had ended in 2011 but was reintroduced in 2016. The two main brands that the company promotes are Raw and SmackDown, collectively referred to as the main roster. Wrestlers assigned to the two main brands exclusively perform on the respective weekly television programs, Monday Night Raw and Friday Night SmackDown, albeit with some exceptions. The Raw brand also has a supplementary online streaming program called Main Event. Monthly pay-per-view and livestreaming events—referred to as Premium Live Events (PLEs)—as well as the non-televised WWE Live shows, feature wrestlers from both brands.

WWE has two developmental brands. The primary developmental brand is NXT, which launched in 2012 (Note: In its original incarnation that launched in 2010, NXT was a reality-based television show in which rookies competed to become a star in WWE. In 2012, NXT was relaunched as a separate brand and replaced the now-defunct Florida Championship Wrestling (FCW) as WWE's primary developmental brand.) and is where most WWE wrestlers perform prior to being promoted to the main roster. Wrestlers assigned to NXT appear on the Tuesday night NXT program and the brand's major livestreaming events—also referred to as PLEs—that are held periodically throughout the year. Evolve is a developmental brand that launched in 2025 and features mostly newer wrestlers that are still in training at the WWE Performance Center. These wrestlers appear on the Wednesday night program, Evolve. Furthermore, there is WWE Independent Development (ID), a developmental program that also launched in 2025 and helps to support wrestlers on the independent circuit and provide a pathway to potentially joining WWE. These wrestlers may also appear on Evolve.

WWE also acquired the Mexican promotion Lucha Libre AAA Worldwide (AAA) in 2025, and while it still primarily operates as a separate promotion, wrestlers from Raw, SmackDown, and NXT often appear in AAA and vice versa, also allowing them to challenge for their respective titles; for AAA's titles, see AAA's list. One of these titles is open to all WWE brands, listed here below. WWE also has a partnership with American promotion Total Nonstop Action Wrestling (TNA) that began in 2024, which primarily sees crossover between NXT and TNA (with rare occurrences with the main roster) where wrestlers may appear on each other's programs and challenge for titles; for TNA's titles, see TNA's list.

=== Main roster ===
For the men's division, both Raw and SmackDown feature a primary, secondary, and tag team championship, while for the women's division, each brand has a primary and secondary championship. There are also two championships open to both brands - a men's cruiserweight championship which is also available to NXT and sister promotion Lucha Libre AAA Worldwide (AAA), and a women's tag team championship that is also available to NXT.

==== Men ====
At the top of WWE's championship hierarchy for male wrestlers are the World Heavyweight Championship on Raw and the Undisputed WWE Championship on SmackDown—regarded as world heavyweight championships. The World Heavyweight Championship is held by first-time champion Roman Reigns, who defeated CM Punk at WrestleMania 42 Night 2 on April 19, 2026. The Undisputed WWE Championship is held by two-time champion Sami Zayn, who defeated CM Punk on the September 11, 2026, episode of SmackDown.

Secondary titles for male wrestlers include the Intercontinental Championship on Raw and the United States Championship on SmackDown. The Intercontinental Championship is held by first-time champion Ethan Page, who defeated Chad Gable on the November 2, 2026, episode of Raw. The United States Championship is held by two-time champion Trick Williams, who defeated Baron Corbin at Sunday Night's Main Event on September 6, 2026.

Tag team titles for male wrestlers include the World Tag Team Championship on Raw and the WWE Tag Team Championship on SmackDown—regarded as world tag team championships. The World Tag Team Championship is held by Penta and Je'Von Evans, who are in their first reign, both as a team and individually. They defeated The Vision (Bron Breakker and Austin Theory) at Crown Jewel on November 7, 2026. The WWE Tag Team Championship is held by The MFTs (Tama Tonga and Talla Tonga), who are in their first reign as a team, while individually, it is Tama's third reign and Talla's first. They won the title by defeating previous champions Damian Priest and R-Truth and The War Raiders (Erik and Ivar) in a triple threat tag team match on the August 14, 2026, episode of SmackDown.

There is one championship open to male wrestlers 231 lb (105 kg) and under, referred to as a cruiserweight championship. This is the AAA World Cruiserweight Championship. It was originally the exclusive property of the Mexican promotion AAA, which WWE acquired in 2025. On the September 28, 2026, episode of Raw, reigning champion Rey Fénix announced that going forward, the title would be open to all brands under WWE, with the champion able to defend the title on any show. Fénix is in his second reign and he won the title by defeating Laredo Kid at AAA's Noche de Los Grandes on May 30, 2026.

==== Women ====
At the top of WWE's championship hierarchy for female wrestlers are the Women's World Championship on Raw and the WWE Women's Championship on SmackDown—regarded as women's world championships. The Women's World Championship is held by four-time champion Liv Morgan, who defeated previous champion Stephanie Vaquer and Becky Lynch in a triple threat match on October 10, 2026 at Money in the Bank. The WWE Women's Championship is held by two-time champion Tiffany Stratton, who won the title by defeating Chelsea Green in her Money in the Bank cash-in match at Crown Jewel on November 7, 2026.

The secondary titles for female wrestlers are the Women's Intercontinental Championship on Raw and the Women's United States Championship on SmackDown. The Women's Intercontinental Championship is held by first-time champion Iyo Sky, who defeated Raquel Rodriguez on the November 16, 2026, episode of Raw. The Women's United States Championship is held by first-time champion Jacy Jayne. She defeated Tiffany Stratton on the August 14, 2026, episode of SmackDown.

The tag team title for female wrestlers is the WWE Women's Tag Team Championship, which is shared between Raw, SmackDown, and NXT. It is held by Michin and B-Fab from SmackDown, who are in their first reign both as a team and individually. They defeated Alexa Bliss and Tatum Paxley on the October 23, 2026, episode of SmackDown.

=== Developmental ===
For the men's division, NXT features a primary, a secondary, and a tag team championship, while the women's division has a primary and a secondary championship. There is also a women's tag team championship shared with Raw and SmackDown (listed above).

Evolve and WWE ID each feature one singles championship for their respective men's and women's divisions.

==== NXT ====
Men

The top title for male wrestlers is the NXT Championship. It is held by first-time champion Grayson Waller. He won the title by defeating previous champion Tony D'Angelo, Cruz Montana, and Zilla Fatu in a fatal four-way match at Heatwave on August 30, 2026.

The secondary title for male wrestlers is the NXT North American Championship. It is held by first-time champion Jackson Drake, who defeated Myles Borne at Heatwave on August 30, 2026.

The men's tag team title is the NXT Tag Team Championship. It is held by two-time champions The Vanity Project (Brad Baylor and Ricky Smokes), who defeated Myles Borne and Tavion Heights at Heatwave on August 30, 2026.

Women

The top title for female wrestlers is the NXT Women's Championship. It is held by first-time champion Kelani Jordan. She won the title by defeating Kendal Grey at Heatwave on August 30, 2026.

The secondary women's title is the NXT Women's North American Championship. It is held by first-time champion Zaria. She defeated Tatum Paxley on NXT on June 9, 2026.

==== Evolve ====
While primarily contested between wrestlers on the Evolve brand, wrestlers in the WWE ID program are also eligible to challenge for the men's and women's Evolve titles.

The WWE Evolve Men's Championship is held by first-time champion Harlem Lewis. He defeated Aaron Rourke during the Evolve tapings on June 19, 2026, which aired on tape delay on July 15, 2026.

The WWE Evolve Women's Championship is held by first-time champion Nikkita Lyons. She defeated Wendy Choo at Evolve: Succession III, which was taped on May 29, 2026, and aired on tape delay on June 24, 2026.

==== WWE ID ====
Unlike WWE's other championships, which are exclusively defended on WWE's programming with very few exceptions, the WWE ID titles are exclusively defended across partner independent promotions. Additionally, all independent wrestlers are eligible to challenge for the titles and if a non-WWE ID wrestler were to win either, they receive a WWE ID contract.

The men's WWE ID Championship is held by first-time champion Max Abrams. He won the title by defeating Chazz "Starboy" Hall at The Nightmare Factory's event, The ID Showcase, on June 26, 2026.

The WWE Women's ID Championship is held by first-time champion Monica Monroe. She defeated Laynie Luck at Reality of Wrestling's event, Rise of Wrestling Royalty, on October 3, 2026, also earning a WWE ID contract.

=== Triple Crown and Grand Slam recognition ===
Note: Championships listed here only refer to the current active versions, not a previous or retired version that has the same name, as retired championships are not eligible for the current Triple Crown or Grand Slam formats. (Note: The World Heavyweight Championship refers to the version established in 2023, not the World Heavyweight Championship that was retired in 2013.; The World Tag Team Championship refers to the version established in 2002, not the World Tag Team Championship that was retired in 2010.; The WWE Tag Team Championship refers to the version established in 2016, not the WWE Tag Team Championship that was established in 2002 and now known as the World Tag Team Championship.; The WWE Women's Championship refers to the version established in 2016, not the WWE Women's Championship that was retired in 2010.)

In professional wrestling, a Triple Crown is an achievement for having won three specific titles within a promotion over the course of a wrestler's career, while a Grand Slam is an achievement for having won four titles over a career, typically the same three titles of the Triple Crown plus a fourth title.

For Raw and SmackDown, a male wrestler who has won the Undisputed WWE Championship, the Intercontinental Championship, and the World Tag Team Championship is recognized to have won the men's WWE Triple Crown. (Note: The World Heavyweight Championship, the WWE United States Championship, and the WWE Tag Team Championship are currently not eligible substitutes for their respective counterparts of the Triple Crown.) A wrestler who has won one world championship, (Note: Either the Undisputed WWE Championship or the World Heavyweight Championship.) both secondary championships, (Note: The WWE Intercontinental Championship and the WWE United States Championship.) and one world tag team championship (Note: Either the World Tag Team Championship or the WWE Tag Team Championship.) is recognized to have won the men's WWE Grand Slam. Sami Zayn is the most recent men's Triple Crown and Grand Slam winner, simultaneously completing both upon winning the Undisputed WWE Championship at Night of Champions on June 27, 2026, becoming the 36th men's Triple Crown Champion and overall 26th men's Grand Slam Champion (19th under the current format). His Grand Slam is recognized by the Undisputed WWE Championship, the Intercontinental and United States championships, and the Undisputed WWE Tag Team Championship. (Note: In 2023, Zayn simultaneously held both the World and WWE Tag Team Championships—then known as the Raw and SmackDown Tag Team Championships, respectively—as the Undisputed WWE Tag Team Championship.)

For NXT, a male wrestler who has won the NXT Championship, the NXT North American Championship, and the NXT Tag Team Championship is recognized to have won the NXT Triple Crown, while a wrestler who has won the three aforementioned titles plus the now-defunct NXT Heritage Cup, in no particular order, is recognized to have won the NXT Grand Slam. (Note: It has not been confirmed if the now-defunct WWE Speed Championship is an eligible substitute in place of the NXT Heritage Cup for the NXT Grand Slam.) Tony D'Angelo is the most recent NXT Triple Crown and Grand Slam winner, simultaneously completing both by winning the NXT Championship at Stand & Deliver on April 4, 2026, becoming the third NXT Triple Crown Champion and the first-ever NXT Grand Slam Champion.

There is also a men's WWE Tag Team Triple Crown for teams composed of the same two wrestlers. (Note: Chad Gable is an example of a wrestler who has won the three required titles but not with the same tag team partner and is thus not considered a Tag Team Triple Crown winner.) It requires the tag team titles from Raw, SmackDown, and NXT: the World Tag Team Championship, the WWE Tag Team Championship, and the NXT Tag Team Championship. The Hardy Boyz (Jeff Hardy and Matt Hardy) are the fourth and most recent Tag Team Triple Crown winners, (Note: The Hardy Boyz first won the current World Tag Team Championship in April 2017 and then the current WWE Tag Team Championship in April 2019, when the titles were previously known as the Raw and SmackDown Tag Team Championships, respectively (both were renamed in 2024).) completing it by winning the NXT Tag Team Championship at NXT vs. TNA Showdown on October 7, 2025; uniquely, they achieved this while being under contract with TNA through WWE's partnership with the company.

There is also a women's Triple Crown and Grand Slam for Raw and SmackDown, with the latter currently also requiring one NXT championship; NXT itself currently does not have a women's Triple Crown or Grand Slam achievement. The WWE Women's Triple Crown requires the Women's World Championship, the WWE Women's Championship, and the WWE Women's Tag Team Championship, while the WWE Women's Grand Slam requires the three aforementioned titles plus the NXT Women's Championship, in no particular order. (Note: Secondary women's championships—the WWE Women's Intercontinental Championship and the WWE Women's United States Championship—were introduced in late 2024 but WWE have not yet updated the Women's Triple Crown or Grand Slam formats to include these and be similar to the men's.) Iyo Sky is the most recent women's Triple Crown and Grand Slam winner, simultaneously completing both upon winning the Women's World Championship on Raw on March 3, 2025, becoming the 10th Women's Triple Crown Champion and 7th Women's Grand Slam Champion.

== Current champions ==
Note: Tables with a "Days rec." column means that WWE officially recognizes a different number of days that a wrestler has held a title, generally due to an event airing on tape delay.

The colors and symbols indicate the home brand of the champions.

†	Raw	‡	SmackDown	§	NXT	+	Evolve	*	ID	∞	Unaffiliated

=== Main roster ===
==== Raw ====
Raw
Championship	Current champion(s)	Reign	Date won	Days held	Location	Notes	Ref.
World Heavyweight Championship	Roman Reigns	1	April 19, 2026	213	Paradise, Nevada	Defeated CM Punk at WrestleMania 42 Night 2.	
Women's World Championship	Liv Morgan	4	October 10, 2026	39	New Orleans, Louisiana	Defeated previous champion Stephanie Vaquer and Becky Lynch in a triple threat match at Money in the Bank.	
WWE Intercontinental Championship	Ethan Page	1	November 2, 2026	16	Brooklyn, New York	Defeated Chad Gable on Raw.	
WWE Women's Intercontinental Championship	Iyo Sky	1	November 16, 2026	2	Raleigh, North Carolina	Defeated Raquel Rodriguez on Raw.	
World Tag Team Championship	Penta and Je'Von Evans	1	November 7, 2026	11	Riyadh, Saudi Arabia	Defeated The Vision (Bron Breakker and Austin Theory) at Crown Jewel.	

==== SmackDown ====
SmackDown
Championship	Current champion(s)	Reign	Date won	Days held	Location	Notes	Ref.
Undisputed WWE Championship	Sami Zayn	2	September 11, 2026	68	Azcapotzalco, Mexico City, Mexico	Defeated CM Punk on SmackDown.	
WWE Women's Championship	Tiffany Stratton	2	November 7, 2026	11	Riyadh, Saudi Arabia	Defeated Chelsea Green in Stratton's Money in the Bank cash-in match at Crown Jewel.	
WWE United States Championship	Trick Williams	2	September 6, 2026	73	Atlanta, Georgia	Defeated Baron Corbin at Sunday Night's Main Event.	
WWE Women's United States Championship	Jacy Jayne	1	August 14, 2026	96	Boston, Massachusetts	Defeated Tiffany Stratton on SmackDown.	
WWE Tag Team Championship	The MFTs (Tama Tonga and Talla Tonga)	1 (3, 1)	August 14, 2026	96	Boston, Massachusetts	Defeated previous champions Damian Priest and R-Truth and The War Raiders (Erik and Ivar) in a triple threat tag team match on SmackDown.	

==== Open ====
Open
Championship	Current champion(s)	Reign	Date won	Days held	Location	Notes	Ref.
AAA World Cruiserweight Championship	Rey Fénix	2	May 30, 2026	172	Monterrey, Nuevo León, Mexico	Defeated Laredo Kid at Noche de Los Grandes. On the September 28, 2026, episode of WWE Raw, reigning champion Rey Fénix announced that the title would now be open to all brands under WWE, with the champion able to defend the title on any show.	
WWE Women's Tag Team Championship	Michin and B-Fab	1	October 23, 2026	26	Ontario, California	Defeated Alexa Bliss and Tatum Paxley on SmackDown.	

=== Developmental ===
==== NXT ====
NXT
Championship	Current champion(s)	Reign	Date won	Days held	Location	Notes	Ref.
NXT Championship	Grayson Waller	1	August 30, 2026	80	Edinburg, Texas	Defeated previous champion Tony D'Angelo, Cruz Montana, and Zilla Fatu in a fatal four-way match at Heatwave.	
NXT Women's Championship	Kelani Jordan	1	August 30, 2026	80	Edinburg, Texas	Defeated Kendal Grey at Heatwave.	
NXT North American Championship	Jackson Drake	1	August 30, 2026	80	Edinburg, Texas	Defeated Myles Borne at Heatwave.	
NXT Women's North American Championship	Zaria	1	June 9, 2026	162	Orlando, Florida	Defeated Tatum Paxley on NXT.	
NXT Tag Team Championship	The Vanity Project (Brad Baylor and Ricky Smokes)	2	August 30, 2026	80	Edinburg, Texas	Defeated Myles Borne and Tavion Heights at Heatwave.	

==== Evolve ====
Evolve
Championship	Current champion(s)	Reign	Date Won	Days held	Days rec.	Location	Notes	Ref.
WWE Evolve Men's Championship	Harlem Lewis	1	June 19, 2026	152	126	Orlando, Florida	Defeated Aaron Rourke on Evolve. WWE recognizes Lewis' reign as beginning on July 15, 2026, when the episode aired on tape delay.	
WWE Evolve Women's Championship	Nikkita Lyons	1	May 29, 2026	173	147	Orlando, Florida	Defeated Wendy Choo at Evolve: Succession III. WWE recognizes Lyons's reign as beginning on June 24, 2026, when the episode aired on tape delay.	

==== WWE ID ====
WWE ID
Championship	Current champion(s)	Reign	Date won	Days held	Location	Notes	Ref.
WWE ID Championship	Max Abrams	1	June 26, 2026	145	Atlanta, Georgia	Defeated Chazz "Starboy" Hall at The Nightmare Factory's event, The ID Showcase.	
WWE Women's ID Championship	Monica Monroe	1	October 3, 2026	46	Texas City, Texas	Defeated Laynie Luck at Reality of Wrestling's event, Rise of Wrestling Royalty, also earning a WWE ID contract.	

== See also ==
- List of current champions in Lucha Libre AAA Worldwide
- Grand Slam (professional wrestling)
- Triple Crown (professional wrestling)

Championship types in WWE

- World championships in WWE
- Women's championships in WWE
- Tag team championships in WWE

Champions in WWE lists

- List of former championships in WWE
- List of WWE Champions
- List of WWE Intercontinental Champions
- List of World Tag Team Champions (WWE)
- List of Women's World Champions (WWE)
- List of World Heavyweight Champions (WWE, 2002–2013)
- List of WWE United States Champions
- List of WWE Tag Team Champions
- List of WWE Women's Champions
- List of WWE Women's Tag Team Champions
- List of NXT Champions
- List of NXT North American Champions
- List of NXT Tag Team Champions
- List of NXT Women's Champions
