= ID Championship Tournament =

2025 WWE ID, Future Stars of Wrestling, and Game Changer Wrestling event

- Promotion(s): WWE (WWE ID); Future Stars of Wrestling; Game Changer Wrestling
- Date: Night 1: April 16, 2025 (GCW); Night 2: April 18, 2025 (FSW)
- City: Night 1: Paradise, Nevada; Night 2: Las Vegas, Nevada
- Venue: Night 1: Palms Casino Resort; Night 2: FSW Arena

Game Changer Wrestling event chronology
← Previous; The Philly Special	Next → Josh Barnett's Bloodsport XIII

Future Stars of Wrestling event chronology
← Previous; Ground Zero	Next → Future Legends Women's Tournament

WWE ID event chronology
← Previous; First	Next → NYWC ID Showcase

The ID Championship Tournament was a professional wrestling pay-per-view event promoted by Future Stars of Wrestling (FSW) and Game Changer Wrestling (GCW) in partnership with WWE's Independent Development program. The event took place on April 16, 2025 at the Palms Casino Resort in Paradise, Nevada as part of GCW's Collective and April 18, 2025 at the FSW Arena in Las Vegas, Nevada as part of FSW's Full Tilt 3. Both nights were streamed live on Triller TV and featured opening rounds for both the WWE ID Championship tournament and the WWE Women's ID Championship tournament.

== Background ==
During a press conference on February 18, 2025, WWE's Chief Content Officer, Paul "Triple H" Levesque, unveiled the men's and women's WWE ID Championships. The titles would be defended exclusively across the independent circuit, offering emerging talent increased exposure and opportunities. WWE also announced that the inaugural champions would be determined through a tournament featuring top prospects from the WWE ID program. The tournament matches were scheduled to take place at various independent wrestling shows, highlighting WWE's collaboration with the independent wrestling scene. Participants of the inaugural tournament were all WWE ID prospects. On March 17, 2025, WWE announced that first round matches for the tournament would held by Game Changer Wrestling (GCW) on April 16 and Future Stars of Wrestling (FSW) on April 18 during WrestleMania 41 weekend. On April 7, 2025, WWE confirmed that after the crowning of the inaugural champions, all independent wrestlers would be eligible to challenge for the ID Championships and that if a non-WWE ID wrestler were to win either title, they would receive a WWE ID contract.

== Storylines ==
The ID Championship Tournament featured professional wrestling matches that involves different wrestlers from pre-existing scripted feuds and storylines. Wrestlers portrayed villains, heroes, or less distinguishable characters in scripted events that built tension and culminated in a wrestling match or series of matches. Storylines were produced on WWE Evolve and various events on the independent circuit.

== Results ==
Other on-screen personnel
Role:	Name:
Commentators	Jake Black (FSW)
Commentators	Trevin Adams
Commentators	Dave Prazak (GCW)
Ring announcers	Mianda Morales (FSW)
Ring announcers	Diana Sandoval (FSW)
Ring announcers	Emil Jay (GCW)

Night 1 - August 16, 2025
No.	Results	Stipulations	Times
1	Jordan Oasis defeated Freedom Ramsey by pinfall	WWE ID Championship Tournament first round match	10:58
2	Zara Zakher defeated Izzy Moreno by pinfall	Singles match	4:53
3	It's GAL defeated Aaron Rourke by pinfall	WWE ID Championship Tournament first round match	8:45
4	Ice Williams defeated Aaron Roberts and Atticus Cogar by pinfall	WWE ID Championship Tournament first round triple threat match	6:32
5	Kylie Rae defeated Zayda Steel by pinfall	WWE Women's ID Championship Tournament first round match	8:44
6	Marcus Mathers defeated Sam Holloway by pinfall	WWE ID Championship Tournament first round	12:38
7	Jackson Drake and Swipe Right (Brad Baylor and Ricky Smokes) defeated Cappuccino Jones, Jack Cartwheel, and Sean Legacy by pinfall	Six man tag team match	21:00

Night 2 - April 18, 2025
No.	Results	Stipulations	Times
1	Cappuccino Jones defeated It's GAL by pinfall	WWE ID Championship Tournament first round match	7:03
2	Brittnie Brooks and Zara Zakher defeated Mazzerati and Zayda Steel by pinfall	Tag team match	10:35
3	Freedom Ramsey defeated Bodhi Young Prodigy by pinfall	Singles match	5:47
4	Aaron Rourke defeated Sam Holloway by pinfall	WWE ID Championship Tournament first round match	9:28
5	Aaron Roberts defeated Jordan Oasis by pinfall	WWE ID Championship Tournament first round match	7:07
6	Jackson Drake defeated Marcus Mathers by pinfall	WWE ID Championship Tournament first round match	18:32
7	Sean Legacy defeated Ricky Smokes (w/Brad Baylor and Jackson Drake) by pinfall	WWE ID Championship Tournament first round match	8:32
8	Ice Williams defeated Brad Baylor by pinfall	WWE ID Championship Tournament first round match	11:13
