= FSW ID Showcase =

2026 WWE ID and Future Stars of Wrestling event

FSW Presents The ID Showcase
- Promotion(s): WWE (WWE ID); Future Stars of Wrestling
- Date: April 16, 2026
- City: Paradise, Nevada
- Venue: HyperX Arena

WWE ID event chronology
← Previous; WWNLive x HOC ID Showcase: Battle of Champions	Next → Beyond ID Showcase

FSW Presents The ID Showcase was a professional wrestling livestreaming event produced by Future Stars of Wrestling (FSW) in partnership with WWE's Independent Development program. The show took place on April 16, 2026 at the HyperX Arena in Paradise, Nevada. The event was held during WrestleMania 42 weekend and was streamed live on Title Match Network.

== Production ==
=== Background ===
In October 2024, the American professional wrestling company WWE introduced the Independent Development (ID) program, similar to their Next in Line (NIL) program for college athletes, with ID to support the development of independent wrestlers by collaborating with various wrestling schools and promotions on the independent circuit. The inaugural partner promotions and schools confirmed were Reality of Wrestling, Black and Brave Academy, Nightmare Factory, Elite Pro Wrestling Training Center, and KnokX Pro Academy.

During a press conference on February 18, 2025, WWE's Chief Content Officer, Paul "Triple H" Levesque, unveiled men's and women's WWE ID Championships. The titles were designed to be defended exclusively across the independent circuit, offering emerging talent increased exposure and opportunities. The inaugural champions were determined through a tournament featuring top prospects from the WWE ID program. The tournament matches were scheduled to take place at various independent wrestling shows, highlighting WWE's collaboration with the independent wrestling scene. Participants of the inaugural tournament were all WWE ID prospects, and first round matches were held by Game Changer Wrestling (GCW) on April 16 and Future Stars of Wrestling on April 18 during WrestleMania 41 week. It was then confirmed that after the crowning of the inaugural champions, all independent wrestlers would be eligible to challenge for the ID Championships and that if a non-WWE ID wrestler were to win either title, they would receive a WWE ID contract. On March 23, 2026, WWE announced that Aaron Rourke would defend the WWE Evolve Men's Championship at FSW's ID Showcase.

=== Storylines ===
FSW Presents The ID Showcase featured professional wrestling matches that involves different wrestlers from pre-existing scripted feuds and storylines. Wrestlers portrayed villains, heroes, or less distinguishable characters in scripted events that built tension and culminated in a wrestling match or series of matches. Storylines were produced on WWE Evolve, various Future Stars of Wrestling events, and various events on the independent circuit.

== Results ==
Other on-screen personnel
Role:	Name:
Commentators	Jake Black
Commentators	Trevin Adams

No.	Results	Stipulations	Times
1	Starboy Charlie (c) defeated Marcus Mathers	Singles match for the WWE ID Championship	14:00
2	Timothy Thatcher defeated Sam Holloway	Singles match	9:34
3	Jariel Rivera defeated Jha'Quan McNair and Jimmy House	Triple threat match	5:46
4	Brittnie Brooks defeated Valentina Rossi	Singles match	7:27
5	Airica Demia defeated Fallyn Grey	Singles match	7:31
6	It's GAL defeated Mike Cunningham	Singles match	12:21
7	Laynie Luck (c) defeated Notorious Mimi	Singles match for the WWE Women's ID Championship	14:13
8	Aaron Rourke (c) defeated Cappuccino Jones	Singles match for the WWE Evolve Championship	15:05
(c) / – the champion(s) heading into the match
