= Future Stars of Wrestling =

American independent professional wrestling promotion

- Acronym: FSW
- Founded: May 2009; 17 years ago
- Style: Professional wrestling
- Headquarters: FSW Arena, 6035 Harrison Drive, Las Vegas, Nevada, United States
- Founder: Joe DeFalco
- Owner: Joe DeFalco
- Website: https://fswvegas.com/

Future Stars of Wrestling is an American independent professional wrestling promotion founded in 2009 by Joe DeFalco. The promotion also operates a training facility inside the FSW Arena.

== History ==
On August 21, 2021, FSW held its first cross-promotional event with Game Changer Wrestling (GCW) titled FSW vs. GCW at the FSW Arena with the main event being AJ Gray teaming up with Nick Gage in a tag team match against Cut Throat Cody and Funny Bone. On May 27, 2023, FSW and GCW held another cross-promotional event.

On May 27, 2022, FSW teamed up with Wrestling Revolver to present Deuces Wild at the Silver Nugget Casino in Las Vegas, Nevada. In the main event, Chris Bey won the Revolver Championship in a four-way match which featured champion JT Dunn, Kenny King, and Rich Swann.

On March 23, 2025, FSW held Mecca X: Benefit for Bey as a charity show in which the profits from the show would be donated to support the recovery of Chris Bey who was injured during a TNA Impact taping in October 2024.

On April 18, 2025, FSW partnered with WWE and their Independent Development program to present the ID Championship Tournament at the FSW Arena. The event featured several WWE ID wrestlers including Cappuccino Jones, Zayda Steel, Aaron Rourke, Jackson Drake, Sean Legacy, Ricky Smokes, and Brad Baylor.

On January 24, 2026, FSW presented their first show at the HyperX Arena at the Luxor Las Vegas in Paradise, Nevada. On April 16, 2026, FSW held their second WWE ID-branded show at the HyperX Arena.

== Championships ==
Championship	Current champion(s)	Date won	Days held	Event	Location	Notes
FSW Heavyweight Championship	Bodhi Young Prodigy	June 20, 2026	62+	FSW 17th Anniversary: Neon Milestone	Las Vegas, Nevada	
FSW Future Legends Championship	Bodhi Young Prodigy	April 20, 2026	123+	FSW Future Legends Women's Tournament	Las Vegas, Nevada	
FSW Tag Team Championship	Mariachi Montana (Jose Calamaco and Roland Calamaco)	March 8, 2026	166+	No Escape 2026: Total Meltdown	Las Vegas, Nevada	
FSW Mecca Grand Championship	Chris Bey	October 23, 2022	1,398+	Mecca VIII	Las Vegas, Nevada	
FSW No Limits Championship	Jaden Cole	March 29, 2026	145+	Ground Zero 2026	Las Vegas, Nevada	
FSW Nevada State Championship	Bret The Threat	June 20, 2026	62+	FSW 17th Anniversary: Neon Milestone	Las Vegas, Nevada	
FSW Future Shock Championship	Jeffrey Excellence	June 20, 2026	62+	FSW 17th Anniversary: Neon Milestone	Las Vegas, Nevada	
FSW Women's Championship	Zamaya	June 20, 2026	62+	FSW High Octane: Money To Burn	Las Vegas, Nevada	
