= Syko Stu =

American wrestler (born 1980)

- Born: Stuart Smith; November 16, 1980 (age 45); Lakewood, California, U.S.
- Other names: Syko Stu
- Fighting out of: California, U.S.
- Years active: 2009–2025

Stuart Smith (born November 16, 1980), better known as Syko Stu, is an American retired professional wrestler and military veteran best known for his stage presence and military service.

Smith joined KnokX Pro after an Honorable Discharge from the military due in 2009. According to Smith, this was to help deal with the PTSD he suffered after serving.

== Raja Jackson incident ==
In August 2025, Smith was involved in an incident with Raja Jackson, son of Quinton Jackson. Raja knocked Smith unconscious during an incident where Raja slammed Smith and proceeded to punch him a total of 22 (Note: Some sources claim it was 23 punches) times, 18 of which were to his head, at a KnokX Pro Wrestling event. Smith was sent to the hospital and was later reported to be in “stable but critical” condition, reportedly awake but missing teeth, and suffered broken bones in his face. Raja had been livestreaming to Kick at the time of the attack. KnokX Pro described it as "a planned and agreed upon wrestling spot, turned into a selfish, irresponsible act of violence". Quinton Jackson said he was "deeply concerned" and "very upset that any of this happened" and described it as a "work gone wrong".

After the incident, KnokX Pro removed mentions of WWE ID and WWE NIL from their branding, with Mike Johnson of Pro Wrestling Insider writing that it "would appear WWE has severed ties with the promotion and academy as part of the fallout of the Raja Jackson incident". On August 25, the KnokX Pro Academy was removed from the list of WWE ID-affiliated schools featured on the WWE Recruit site. In addition, Raja was banned from Kick.

On September 2, Smith was released from the hospital and returned to his home to recover.

In May 2026, Raja Jackson reached a plea deal with an "anticipated sentence" of 90 days in jail, two years of probation and paying more than $81,700 in restitution. Smith released a statement on May 10 that he has "no grudges" against Jackson.
