= New York Wrestling Connection =

American independent professional wrestling promotion

- Acronym: NYWC
- Founded: 2003
- Style: Professional wrestling
- Headquarters: Deer Park, New York
- Founder(s): Mikey Whipwreck; John Curse; Shane Wayne
- Owner: John Curse
- Website: nywcprowrestling.com

New York Wrestling Connection is an independent professional wrestling promotion based in Deer Park, New York. The promotion was co-founded in 2002 by Mikey Whipwreck, John Curse and Shane Wayne. It is owned by John Curse, a local professional wrestler who has also wrestled in the promotion. The promotion also operates a training facility to train future professional wrestlers and has been credited for creating some of the best wrestlers on the Northeastern independent circuit. Some of the most notable graduates of the NYWC Training Academy include Matt Cardona, Willow Nightingale, Brian Myers, Trent Beretta, Amazing Red, and Mike Mondo.

== History ==
After the closure of Extreme Championship Wrestling and World Championship Wrestling in 2001, Mikey Whipwreck decided to go into semi-retirement due to injuries sustained in his career. Partnering with John Curse (John Curcie) and Shane Wayne (Shane O'Neill), he founded the New York Wrestling Connection the following year with Whipwreck becoming a trainer at the promotion's wrestling school. Curse, a former member of Team Taz and alumni of ECW's "House of Hardcore" wrestling school, also worked as a trainer while Wayne was the booker. The NYWC Sportatorium serves as both the promotion's home arena and training facility with students working in the evenings. The venue was specifically designed to emulate a smaller version of the original ECW Arena. In order to create a more intimate atmosphere the venue had a 300 seating capacity and the walls were painted black to add to the aura during live events when the house lights were dimmed. This approach was popular with other independent promotions including, most notably, Dragon Gate USA which held one of its pay-per-view events there.

The NYWC was one of several promotions founded by ex-ECW wrestlers hoping to attract is large fanbase and becoming a "spiritual successor" to the legendary promotion. The most notable of these were Jason Knight's Assault Championship Wrestling (2000-2004), Joel Gertner's MXW Pro Wrestling (2004-2010), Don and Mike Bucci's Phoenix Championship Wrestling (2001-2003), The Blue Meanie and Jasmin St. Claire's Pro-Pain Pro Wrestling (2002-2005), and Tommy Dreamer's House of Hardcore (2012-2020). As a result, the NYWC connection was able to regularly feature former ECW roster as well as wrestlers who were regulars in the East Coast independent circuit. A number of these indy stars, such as Matt Striker, attracted the attention of World Wrestling Entertainment as a result of their NYWC stints. The promotion's flagship show, Psycho Circus, typically features barbed wire, foreign objects, a steel cage and other elements associated with hardcore wrestling. In October 2007, the NYWC held a special fundraiser at William Floyd High School in Mastic Beach for a 6-month-old girl. The promotion was featured in an amNewYork article highlighting the top independent promotions in the New York metropolitan area. On October 22, 2013, the NYWC was one of nine wrestling promotions to create a new pro wrestling governing body, the United Wrestling Network.

On June 8, 2025, the NYWC held the first ID Showcase which featured talent from WWE's Independent Development program.

== Championships ==
=== Current ===
Championship	Current champion(s)	Date won	Days held	Event	Location	Notes
NYWC Fusion Championship	Bam Sullivan	May 30, 2026	166+	Fight or Flight	Deer Park, New York	
NYWC Heavyweight Championship	Kaide Lothbrok	October 25, 2025	383+	House of Madness 2025	Deer Park, New York	
NYWC Starlet Championship	Kylie Alexa	February 28, 2026	257+	N/A	Farmingville, New York	
NYWC Tag Team Championship	The FBI (CJ Bambino and Nicky Primo)	February 28, 2026	257+	N/A	Farmingville, New York	
