= NXT North American Championship =

WWE men's professional wrestling championship

- The standard NXT North American Championship belt with default side plates.

Details
- Promotion: WWE
- Brand: NXT
- Date established: March 7, 2018
- Current champion: Jackson Drake
- Date won: August 30, 2026
Statistics
- First champion: Adam Cole
- Most reigns: Johnny Gargano (3 reigns)
- Longest reign: 273 days (Note: WWE recognizes that Femi held the title for 272 days, thus officially recognizing Page as the longest reigning champion.): Oba Femi; Ethan Page
- Shortest reign: Trick Williams (3 days)
- Oldest champion: Shawn Spears (44 years, 13 days)
- Youngest champion: Jackson Drake (23 years, 0 days)
- Heaviest champion: Bronson Reed (330 lb (150 kg))
- Lightest champion: Leon Ruff (157 lb (71 kg))

The NXT North American Championship is a men's professional wrestling championship created and promoted by the American promotion WWE. It is defended as the secondary men's championship of NXT, the promotion's developmental brand. The current champion is Jackson Drake, who is in his first reign. He won the title by defeating Myles Borne at Heatwave on August 30, 2026.

The championship was introduced during the March 7, 2018, tapings of NXT (aired March 28) and the inaugural champion was Adam Cole. In September 2019, the company began promoting NXT as its "third brand" when the NXT television program was moved to the USA Network. Two years later, however, NXT reverted to its original function as WWE's developmental brand. In January 2022, the NXT Cruiserweight Championship was unified into the North American Championship.

The title is distinct from the WWF North American Heavyweight Championship, as it does not carry the lineage of the former title, which was contested from 1979 to 1981.

== History ==
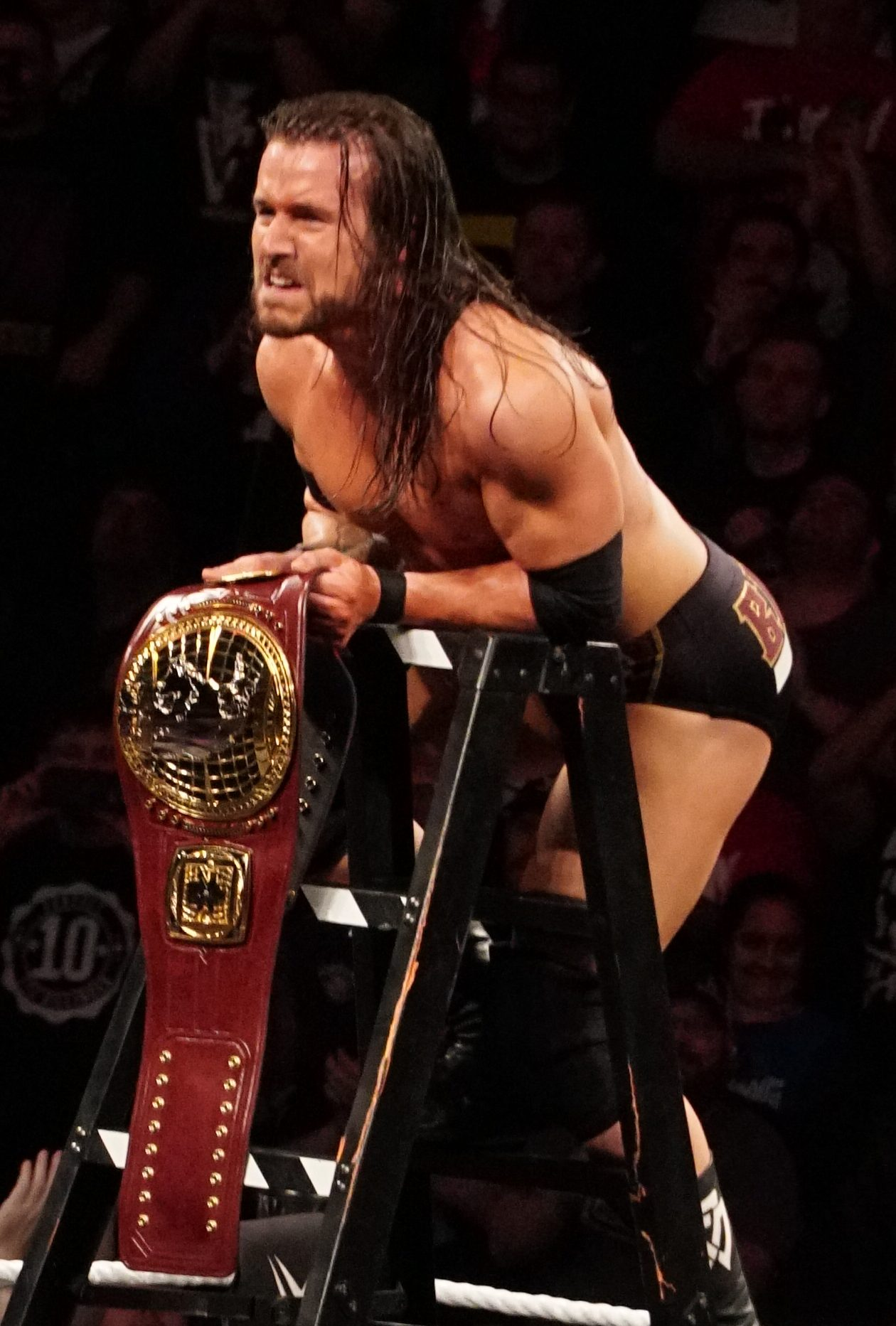
Inaugural champion Adam Cole after winning the title in a 6-man ladder match at TakeOver: New Orleans

In June 2012, WWE established NXT as their developmental territory, replacing Florida Championship Wrestling (FCW). It was not until 2018, however, that a secondary championship was established for the brand. During the March 7, 2018, tapings of NXT (aired March 28), NXT General Manager William Regal announced a ladder match for TakeOver: New Orleans to determine the inaugural NXT North American Champion. Later that night, EC3, Killian Dain, Adam Cole, Ricochet, Lars Sullivan, and Velveteen Dream were announced as the participants in the match. At the event, Cole won the match to become the inaugural champion.

While NXT had originally been established as WWE's developmental territory, the NXT North American Championship was introduced in the midst of NXT establishing itself as WWE's third major brand. This became official when NXT was moved to the USA Network in September 2019, thus making the NXT North American Championship a third secondary title for WWE, along with the WWE Intercontinental Championship and WWE United States Championship. In September 2021, however, NXT reverted to being WWE's developmental brand.

In January 2022, the NXT Cruiserweight Championship was unified into the North American Championship. At the special New Year's Evil episode of NXT on January 4, 2022, reigning North American Champion Carmelo Hayes defeated Cruiserweight Champion Roderick Strong. The Cruiserweight Championship was retired with Hayes going forward as North American Champion.

Whenever the title is held by a main roster wrestler, it occasionally gets defended on main roster shows, such as when SmackDown wrestler Solo Sikoa defended it on SmackDown in September 2022. Raw wrestler "Dirty" Dominik Mysterio also defended it on Raw during his first reign in 2023.

== Belt design ==
The championship belt was unveiled by WWE executive and NXT head Triple H on April 3, 2018. Featuring three gold plates on a thick brown leather strap, the rounded center plate features a globe that only shows the continent of North America. The banner above the globe reads "North American" and above the banner is the NXT logo. The lower banner at the bottom of the globe reads "Champion". In what has become a prominent feature of WWE's championship belts, the two side plates feature a removable center section which can be customized with the champion's logos; the default side plates feature a vertical NXT logo on a globe. This was WWE's first secondary title to feature customizable side plates. It was the only NXT championship to feature the NXT logo for the default side plates until the introduction of the NXT Women's North American Championship in 2024; the other NXT championships feature the WWE logo.

=== Custom design ===
Ethan Page's custom Canadian-themed belt that he used from July 2025 to February 2026.

During the July 22, 2025, episode of NXT, reigning champion Ethan Page introduced his own custom version of the North American Championship belt. It had the overall same design but with the strap painted like the Canadian flag due to Page being Canadian.

== Reigns ==
As of August 30, 2026, there have been 28 reigns among 24 champions and two vacancies. The inaugural champion was Adam Cole. Johnny Gargano has the most reigns at three. Oba Femi and Ethan Page are tied for the longest reign at 273 days, although WWE officially recognizes Femi held it for 272 days, making Page the official longest-reigning champion, while Trick Williams' reign is the shortest reign at 3 days. Jackson Drake is the youngest champion, winning the title at 23 years old, while Shawn Spears is the oldest, winning the title at 44.

Jackson Drake is the current champion in his first reign. He won the title by defeating Myles Borne at Heatwave on August 30, 2026, in Edinburg, Texas.

== See also ==
- NXT Women's North American Championship
- List of current champions in WWE
