= WWE ID Championship =

Men's professional wrestling championship

- The WWE ID Championship belt with default side plates.

Details
- Promotion: WWE; Independent circuit
- Date established: February 18, 2025
- Current champion: Max Abrams
- Date won: June 26, 2026
Statistics
- First champion: Cappuccino Jones
- Most reigns: All titleholders (1 reign)
- Longest reign: Cappuccino Jones (234 days)
- Shortest reign: Chazz "Starboy" Hall (95 days)
- Oldest champion: Cappuccino Jones (24 years, 11 months and 16 days)
- Youngest champion: Chazz "Starboy" Hall (23 years, 1 month and 18 days)
- Heaviest champion: Cappuccino Jones (161 lbs)
- Lightest champion: Chazz "Starboy" Hall (154 lbs)

The WWE ID Championship is a men's professional wrestling championship created and promoted by the American company WWE for their Independent Development (ID) program. Both the men's and women's ID championships were established on February 18, 2025. As WWE ID is designed to provide a pathway for independent wrestlers to transition into WWE, both the men's and women's ID championships are exclusively defended on the independent circuit and open to all independent wrestlers unlike WWE's other titles. If a non-WWE ID wrestler wins either title, they receive a WWE ID contract. The inaugural champion was Cappuccino Jones. The current champion is Max Abrams, who is in his first reign. He won the title by defeating Chazz "Starboy" Hall at The Nightmare Factory's event, The ID Showcase, on June 26, 2026.

== History ==
In October 2024, the American professional wrestling company WWE introduced the Independent Development (ID) program, similar to their Next in Line (NIL) program for college athletes, with ID to support the development of independent wrestlers by collaborating with various wrestling schools and promotions on the independent circuit. The inaugural partner promotions and schools confirmed were Reality of Wrestling, Black and Brave Academy, Nightmare Factory, Elite Pro Wrestling Training Center, and KnokX Pro Academy.

During a press conference on February 18, 2025, WWE's Chief Content Officer, Paul "Triple H" Levesque, unveiled men's and women's WWE ID Championships. The titles were designed to be defended exclusively across the independent circuit, offering emerging talent increased exposure and opportunities. The inaugural champions were determined through a tournament featuring top prospects from the WWE ID program. The tournament matches were scheduled to take place at various independent wrestling shows, highlighting WWE's collaboration with the independent wrestling scene. Participants of the inaugural tournament were all WWE ID prospects, and first round matches were held by Game Changer Wrestling (GCW) on April 16 and Future Stars of Wrestling on April 18 during WrestleMania 41 week. It was then confirmed that after the crowning of the inaugural champions, all independent wrestlers would be eligible to challenge for the ID Championships and that if a non-WWE ID wrestler were to win either title, they would receive a WWE ID contract.

The men's tournament format was a double-elimination tournament. On July 8, 2025, it was confirmed that the tournament final would be held at GCW's ID Showcase, on August 1 during SummerSlam week. The final was between Cappuccino Jones and Jack Cartwheel, which Jones won to become the inaugural ID Champion.

== Inaugural tournament ==
A tournament was held to crown the inaugural WWE ID Champion, featuring a 15-man double-elimination first round where two losses resulted in elimination. This phase continued until only six wrestlers remained. The final six then competed in a single-elimination tournament, with the two wrestlers who recorded the most wins in the first round receiving byes into the semifinals. The tournament spanned from April 16, 2025, to August 1 across six indie promotions: Game Changer Wrestling, Future Stars of Wrestling, Reality of Wrestling, Beyond Wrestling, New York Wrestling Connection, and World Wrestling Network. Cappuccino Jones emerged as the winner, becoming the inaugural WWE ID Champion.

Tournament results

First round matches
Event	Venue	Match	Time
GCW Presents ID Championship Tournament; April 16, 2025	Pearl Theater At Palms Casino Resort; Las Vegas, Nevada	Jordan Oasis (1–0) defeated Freedom Ramsey (0–1)	10:58
GCW Presents ID Championship Tournament; April 16, 2025	Pearl Theater At Palms Casino Resort; Las Vegas, Nevada	It's Gal (1–0) defeated Aaron Rourke (0–1)	8:45
GCW Presents ID Championship Tournament; April 16, 2025	Pearl Theater At Palms Casino Resort; Las Vegas, Nevada	Ice Williams (1–0) defeated Aaron Roberts (0–1) and Atticus Cougar (Note: Atticus Cougar was not part of the tournament. Had he defeated Ice Williams and Aaron Roberts, he would have been added to the tournament.)	6:32
GCW Presents ID Championship Tournament; April 16, 2025	Pearl Theater At Palms Casino Resort; Las Vegas, Nevada	Marcus Mathers (1–0) defeated Sam Holloway (0–1) (Note: This was a No Disqualification match.)	12:38
FSW Presents ID Championship Tournament; April 18, 2025	FSW Arena; Las Vegas, Nevada	Cappuccino Jones (1–0) defeated It's Gal (1–1)	7:03
FSW Presents ID Championship Tournament; April 18, 2025	FSW Arena; Las Vegas, Nevada	Aaron Rourke (1–1) defeated Sam Holloway (0–2)	9:28
FSW Presents ID Championship Tournament; April 18, 2025	FSW Arena; Las Vegas, Nevada	Aaron Roberts (1–1) defeated Jordan Oasis (1–1)	7:07
FSW Presents ID Championship Tournament; April 18, 2025	FSW Arena; Las Vegas, Nevada	Jackson Drake (1–0) defeated Marcus Mathers (1–1)	18:32
FSW Presents ID Championship Tournament; April 18, 2025	FSW Arena; Las Vegas, Nevada	Sean Legacy (1–0) defeated Ricky Smokes (0–1)	8:32
FSW Presents ID Championship Tournament; April 18, 2025	FSW Arena; Las Vegas, Nevada	Ice Williams (2–0) defeated Brad Baylor (0–1)	11:13
ROW No Limits; May 10, 2025	Walker Texas Lawyer Arena; Texas City, Texas	Jack Cartwheel (1–0) defeated Cappuccino Jones (1–1)	9:23
ROW Glory 3 May 31, 2025	Walker Texas Lawyer Arena; Texas City, Texas	Sean Legacy (2–0) defeated Ice Williams (2–1)	7:28
ROW Glory 3 May 31, 2025	Walker Texas Lawyer Arena; Texas City, Texas	Brad Baylor (1–1) defeated Marcus Mathers (1–2)	7:52
Beyond Wrestling Wrestling Open RI; June 2, 2025	Rhodes-on-the Pawtuxet; Cranston, Rhode Island	Brad Baylor (2–1) defeated Aaron Rourke (1–2)	9:16
NYWC ID Showcase; June 8, 2025	NYWC Sportatorium; Deer Park, New York	Bryce Donovan (1–0) defeated Jordan Oasis (1–2)	13:20
NYWC ID Showcase; June 8, 2025	NYWC Sportatorium; Deer Park, New York	Ice Williams (3–1) defeated It's Gal (1–2)	9:20
NYWC ID Showcase; June 8, 2025	NYWC Sportatorium; Deer Park, New York	Jack Cartwheel (2–0) defeated Aaron Roberts (1–2)	6:07
NYWC ID Showcase; June 8, 2025	NYWC Sportatorium; Deer Park, New York	Cappuccino Jones (2–1) defeated Ricky Smokes (0–2)	6:51
NYWC ID Showcase; June 8, 2025	NYWC Sportatorium; Deer Park, New York	Brad Baylor (3–1) defeated Sean Legacy (2–1)	5:22

Removed from tournament
Eliminated

First round ranking
#	Wrestler	W	L
1	Brad Baylor	3	1
1	Ice Williams	3	1
3	Jack Cartwheel	2	0
4	Cappuccino Jones	2	1
4	Sean Legacy	2	1
6	Bryce Donovan	1	0
6	Jackson Drake (Note: On the June 4, 2025, episode of Evolve, Jackson Drake won became the inaugural WWE Evolve Champion. He was subsequently removed from the WWE ID Championship tournament.)	1	0
8	Aaron Roberts	1	2
8	Aaron Rourke	1	2
8	It's Gal	1	2
8	Jordan Oasis	1	2
8	Marcus Mathers	1	2
13	Freedom Ramsey (Note: Freedom Ramsey was removed from the tournament after being released from the WWE ID program.)	0	1
14	Ricky Smokes	0	2
14	Sam Holloway	0	2

Final 6 bracket

Quarterfinals; WWN ID Showcase; July 19, 2025
Jack Cartwheel	Pinfall
Sean Legacy	7:17
Bryce Donovan	7:59
Cappuccino Jones	Pinfall

Semifinals; WWN ID Showcase; July 19, 2025
Brad Baylor	8:19
Jack Cartwheel	Pinfall
Ice Williams	12:51
Cappuccino Jones	Pinfall

Final; GCW Presents The ID Showcase; August 1, 2025
Jack Cartwheel	19:26
Cappuccino Jones	Pinfall

== Design ==
The WWE ID Championship belt features a modern design on a black strap, incorporating elements that represent both WWE and the independent wrestling scene. The center plate prominently displays the WWE ID logo, flanked by customizable side plates that can be personalized by the reigning champion.

== Reigns ==
As of August 15, 2026, there have been three reigns among three champions. The inaugural champion was Cappuccino Jones, who has the longest reign at 234 days. Chazz "Starboy" Hall has the shortest reign at 95 days. Jones is the oldest champion at 24 years, while Hall is the youngest champion at 23 years.

Max Abrams is the current champion in his first reign. He won the title by defeating Chazz "Starboy" Hall at The Nightmare Factory's event, The ID Showcase, on June 26, 2026, in Atlanta, Georgia.

Key
No.	Overall reign number
Reign	Reign number for the specific champion
Days	Number of days held
+	Current reign is changing daily

No.	Champion	Championship change			Reign statistics		Notes	Ref.
No.	Champion	Date	Event	Location	Reign	Days	Notes	Ref.
WWE: ID
1	Cappuccino Jones	August 1, 2025	The ID Showcase	Rutherford, NJ	1	234	This was a Game Changer Wrestling event. Jones defeated Jack Cartwheel in a tournament final to become the inaugural champion.	
2	Starboy Charlie	March 23, 2026	Wrestling Open RI 44: "One of These Nights"	Cranston, RI	1	95	This was a Beyond Wrestling event. Starboy also earned a WWE ID contract. His ring name was later changed to Chazz "Starboy" Hall.	
3	Max Abrams	June 26, 2026	The ID Showcase	Atlanta, GA	1	50+	This was a Nightmare Factory event.	
