= Ricky Smokes =

American male professional wrestler (born 2000)

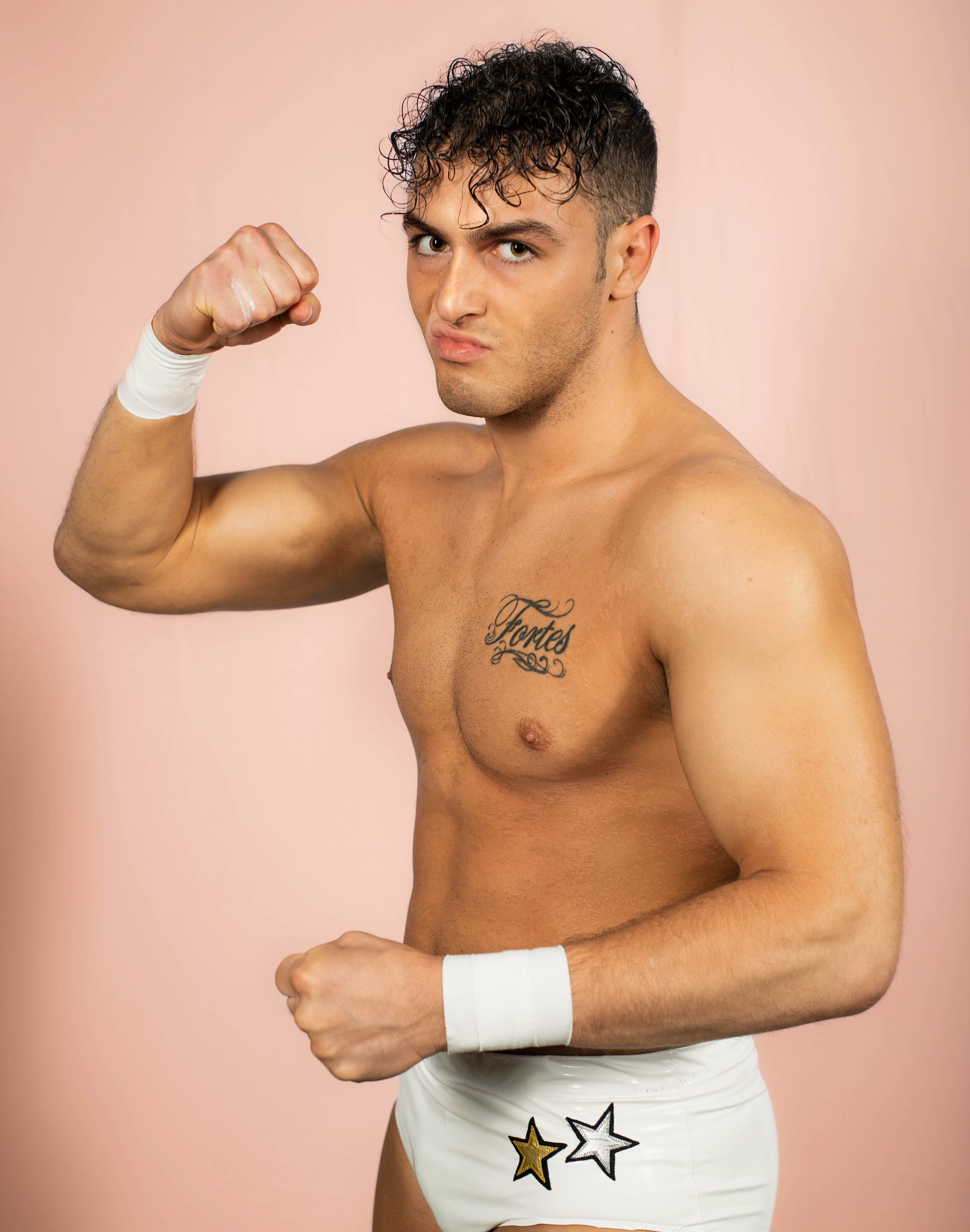
- Smokes in May 2024

Personal information
- Born: April 28, 2000 (age 26) Saugus, Massachusetts, U.S.

Professional wrestling career
- Ring name: Ricky Archer Alfi Shelby Deputy Dale Anjou Ricky Smokes
- Billed weight: 89 kg (196 lb)
- Trained by: New England Pro Wrestling Academy; Brian Fury; Chase Del Monte; Max Smashmaster
- Debut: 2019

Ricky Smokes (born April 28, 2000) is an American professional wrestler signed to WWE, where he performs on the NXT brand. He is one-half of the Swipe Right tag team alongside Brad Baylor as members of The Vanity Project stable. Smokes and Baylor are the reigning NXT Tag Team Champions in their second reign as a team and individually.

== Professional wrestling career ==
=== American independent circuit (2019–2026) ===
Smokes made his professional wrestling debut at a house show promoted by the Wrestling Has A Tomorrow promotion on May 26, 2019, where he competed in a Rumble For Tomorrow Match won by Bullet Joe, which also involved various opponents such as Charles Mason, Jessicka Havok, Jimmy Lloyd and others.

Smokes competed in Game Changer Wrestling (GCW)'s 2025 Joey Janela's Spring Break, where he wrestled in the traditional Clusterfuck Battle Royal, bout won by Brodie Lee Jr. .

Smokes competed in the elimination stages of the inaugural WWE ID Championship tournament where he fell short to Sean Legacy in the first rounds disputed during a Future Stars Of Wrestling house show from April 18, 2025.

=== WWE (2025–present) ===
On the March 5, 2025 episode of Evolve, Smokes teamed up with Brad Baylor as "Swipe Right" alongside Jackson Drake, falling short to Jack Cartwheel, Sean Legacy and Cappuccino Jones in a six-man tag team match in Evolve's first main event after its revival in WWE. On the April 8 episode of NXT, Swipe Right wrestled their NXT debut match, where they lost to NXT Tag Team Champions Nathan Frazer and Axiom in a tag team match. In the same month, Swipe Right and Drake formed The Vanity Project stable with Bryce Donovan and Zayda Steel.

On January 13, 2026 episode of NXT, The Vanity Project (except Donovan and Steel, who had left WWE) were promoted to the NXT brand. On the following week, Baylor and Smokes defeated Chase University (Kale Dixon and Uriah Connors) in their first match as part of the NXT roster. On the February 24 episode of NXT, Baylor and Smokes defeated NXT Tag Team Champions DarkState (Osiris Griffin and Saquon Shugars) to win the titles after interference from Tony D'Angelo. At NXT Stand & Deliver on April 4, 2026, Smokes and Baylor were successful in their first defense of the titles against Los Americanos (Bravo Americano and Rayo Americano) (with El Grande Americano).

== Championships and accomplishments ==
- Alpha-1 Wrestling
  - A1 Tag Team Championship (1 time) – with Brad Baylor
- Beyond Wrestling
  - Wrestling Open Tag Team Championship (1 time) – with Brad Baylor
- Chaotic Wrestling
  - Chaotic Wrestling Heavyweight Championship (1 time)
  - Chaotic Wrestling New England Championship (1 time)
- Northeast Championship Wrestling
  - NCW Tag Team Championship (1 time) – with Charlie Cashew
- Northeast Wrestling
  - NEW Tag Team Championship (1 time) – with Brad Baylor
- WWE
  - NXT Tag Team Championship (2 times, current) – with Brad Baylor
