= Zayda Steel =

Moroccan-American professional wrestler (born 2003)

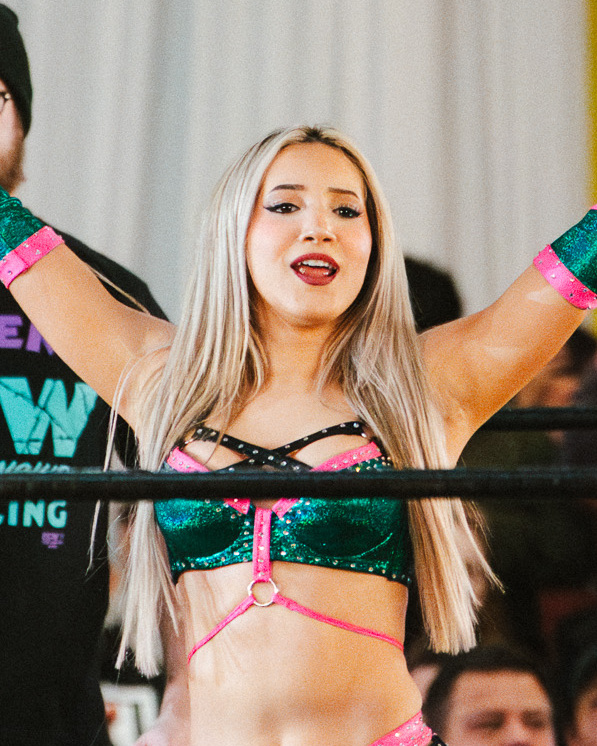
- Steel in March 2025

Personal information
- Born: Fatima Zahra; October 13, 2003 (age 23) Arlington County, Virginia, U.S.

Professional wrestling career
- Ring names: Zayda Steel; Zayda
- Billed height: 5 ft 4 in (163 cm)
- Billed from: "The DMV"
- Trained by: Brian Johnson; Diego Cruz; Drolix; MCW Pro Wrestling Training Center
- Debut: August 7, 2022

Fatima Zahra (Arabic: فاطمة الزهراء; born October 13, 2003), better known by her ring name Zayda Steel, is a Moroccan-American professional wrestler. She is signed to All Elite Wrestling (AEW), where she is a member of SkyFlight. She also makes appearances for its sister promotion Ring of Honor (ROH) and on the independent circuit. Steel is also known for her time in WWE under their WWE ID program, through which she performed on the Evolve brand.

== Early life ==
Fatima Zahra was born in Arlington County, Virginia on October 13, 2003, to Moroccan parents. At 18 years old, she dropped out of high school to pursue a career in professional wrestling and began her training at the MCW Pro Wrestling Training Center.

== Professional wrestling career ==
=== Independent circuit (2022–present) ===
Zahra made her professional wrestling debut as Zayda on August 7, 2022, at Combat Zone Wrestling Limelight 8, losing against Trish Adora. In her debut year, she tweaked her name to Zayda Steel and appeared for promotions like MCW Pro Wrestling, and various independent show in the West Virginia and Pennsylvania region. In the following years, Steel made various appearances for other notable independent promotions like Beyond Wrestling, DEFY Wrestling, Progress Wrestling, Game Changer Wrestling and Booker T's Reality of Wrestling.

On August 1, 2025, at Game Changer Wrestling (GCW) ID Showcase, Steel qualified for the triple threat match tournament final to crown the inaugural WWE Women's ID Champion against Kylie Rae and Zara Zakher, where Rae won to become the inaugural champion.

=== Major League Wrestling (2023–2024) ===
Steel's first appearance for Major League Wrestling (MLW) took place on September 3, 2023, during MLW's flagship show MLW Fusion. Steel competed under the ring name "Zayda". Steel got her first MLW World Women's Featherweight Championship on the MLW Once Upon A Time In New York event, in a losing effort against Delmi Exo.

Steel would get another opportunity at the Women's Featherweight Championship on May 11, 2024, in a four-way match against Janai Kai, Delmi Exo and Miyu Yamashita at MLW Fury Road 2024, losing to champion Janai Kai.

Steel was part of Mister Saint Laurent's "World Titan Federation" faction, alongside Matt Cardona, Richard Holliday, Davey Boy Smith Jr., Gene Snitsky, Tom Lawlor, Steph De Lander, Josh Bishop, Brett Ryan Gosselin, A.J. Francis & Alexander Hammerstone.

=== Dream Star Fighting Marigold (2024) ===
On April 15, 2024, former World Wonder Ring Stardom executive producer Rossy Ogawa held a press conference to announce his new promotion Dream Star Fighting Marigold. On May 20, 2024, at Marigold's debut event Marigold Fields Forever, Steel performed in a tag-team match alongside Mai Sakurai in a losing effort against Myla Grace and Nagisa Nozaki.

Steel appeared on the next Marigold event Marigold Summer Destiny on July 13, 2024, tagging with Myla Grace in a losing effort against Nagisa Nozaki and CHIAKI.

At the Marigold Summer Gold Shine 2024 event, Steel competed in an eight-woman tag team elimination match teaming with Bozilla, CHIAKI & Myla Grace versus Kizuna Tanaka, Mirai, Utami Hayashishita and Victoria Yuzuki, which ended in a 20-minute time-limit draw.

=== WWE (2024–2025) ===
Steel signed with WWE in November 2024 as part of the WWE ID program, becoming the third WWE Superstar of Moroccan descent after Layla and Amale to be signed by WWE.

Steel made her WWE debut on the April 2, 2025 edition of Evolve, losing to Brinley Reece. In April, Steel joined Swipe Right (Brad Baylor and Ricky Smokes), Jackson Drake, and Bryce Donovan to form The Vanity Project. On the May 21 edition of Evolve, Steel lost in a Fatal Four-Way match against Kylie Rae, Aria Bennett and Chantel Monroe to earn an opportunity for the inaugural Evolve Women's Championship match. On October 9, Steel announced that she would not be renewing her WWE ID contract. She wrestled her last WWE televised match on the October 22 episode of Evolve, where she was defeated by Thea Hail.

=== All Elite Wrestling / Ring of Honor (2025–present) ===
On December 2, 2025, Steel debuted for Ring of Honor (ROH) confronting Leila Grey. At Final Battle on the Zero Hour, Steel fought Grey in her debut match but was defeated. On the December 11 episode of ROH on Honor Club, she defeated Rachael Ellering earning her first victory.

On the January 8, 2026 episode of ROH on Honor Club, Steel was announced as the newest member of SkyFlight. Two days later, Steel made her debut for the sister promotion of ROH All Elite Wrestling (AEW) on Collision, being in the corner of SkyFlight during their match against the Death Riders. The following week at Collision: Maximum Carnage, Steel was defeated by Marina Shafir in her AEW debut match. It was then announced by AEW and ROH president Tony Khan that Steel had signed with the promotion. On the February 11 episode of HonorClub, Steel earned her first win in ROH defeating Johnnie Robbie and becoming number one contender for the ROH Women's World Television Championship. On the February 26 episode of HonorClub, Steel failed to defeat Red Velvet for the title. On May 14 at Supercard Showdown, Steel defeated Hyan to qualify for the Survival of the Fittest match the following day at Supercard of Honor for the ROH Women's World Championship, but was eliminated by the reigning champion Athena.

== Championships and accomplishments ==
- New Texas Pro Wrestling
  - New Texas Pro Women's Championship (1 time)
- Warriors Of Wrestling
  - WOW Women's Championship (1 time)
- Pro Wrestling Illustrated
  - Ranked No. 117 of the top 250 female wrestlers in the PWI Women's 250 in 2025
