= Jack Cartwheel =

American professional wrestler (born 2000)

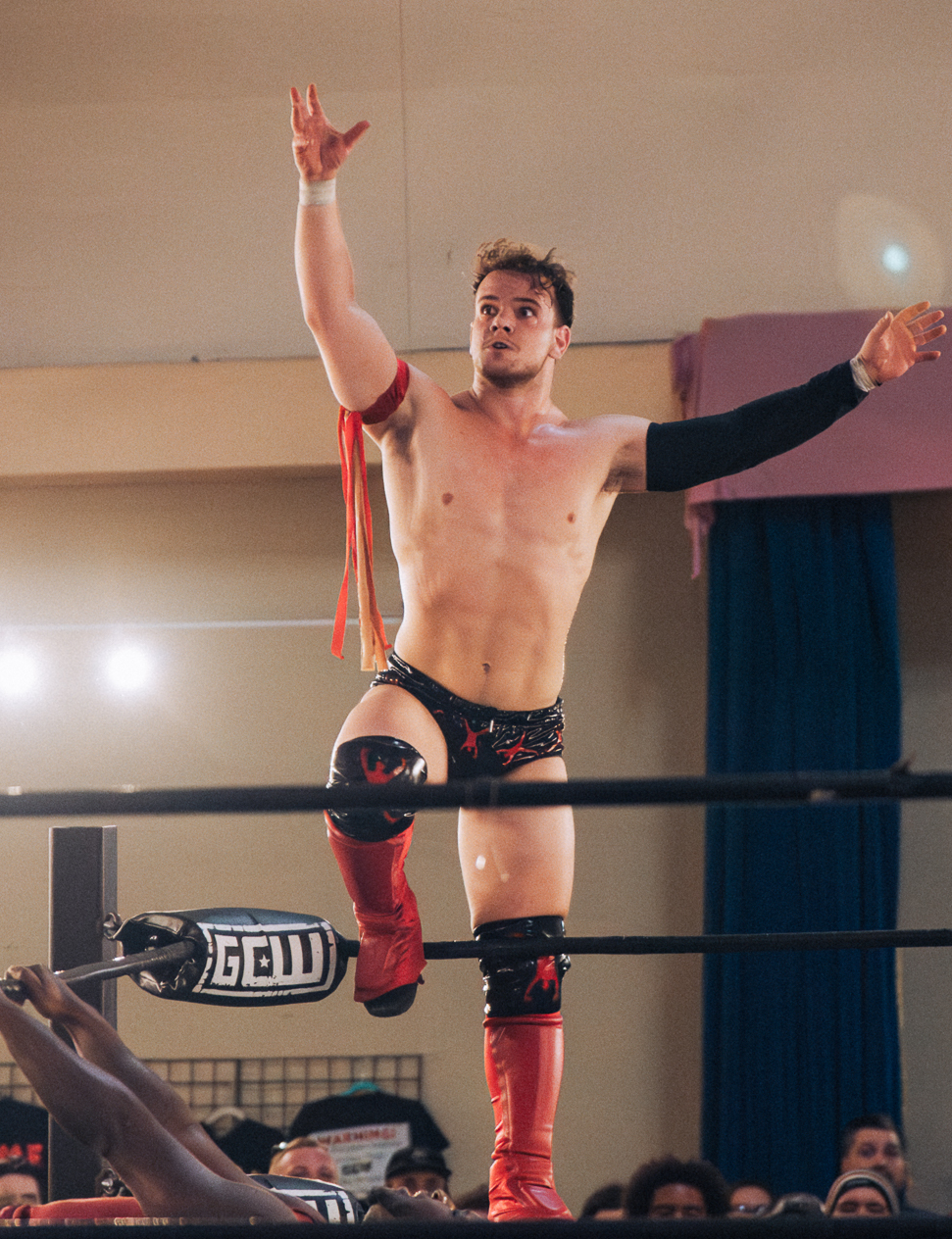
- Cartwheel in June 2024

Personal information
- Born: August 19, 2000 (age 26) Sacramento, California, U.S.

Professional wrestling career
- Ring name(s): Jack Cartwheel; Jack Cartwright; Jack Summit
- Billed height: 5 ft 7 in (170 cm)
- Billed weight: 189 lb (86 kg)
- Trained by: Supreme Pro Wrestling
- Debut: May 4, 2019

Jack Summit (born August 19, 2000), better known under the ring name Jack Cartwheel, is an American professional wrestler. He is signed to WWE sister promotion Lucha Libre AAA Worldwide.

Summit is known for his time on the independent circuit in California. He has also made appearances for Ring of Honor, All Elite Wrestling, and Game Changer Wrestling.

== Career ==
=== Independent circuit (2019–2026) ===
Jack Summit made his professional wrestling debut on the independent circuit in 2019 using the ring name Jack Cartwheel. On May 15, 2021, he made his debut for Game Changer Wrestling, defeating Jimmy Lloyd. On February 2, 2023, he made an appearance in Major League Wrestling, teaming with Myzteziz Jr. and Willie Mack to defeat Dinamico, Genio del Aire, and Skalibur.

In July 2025, Cartwheel was announced as one of the six finalist in the tournament to crown the inaugural WWE ID Men's Championship. Cartwheel qualified to the tournament final at Game Changer Wrestling (GCW) ID Showcase on August 1, where he lost to his Adrenaline Drip tag team partner, Cappuccino Jones.

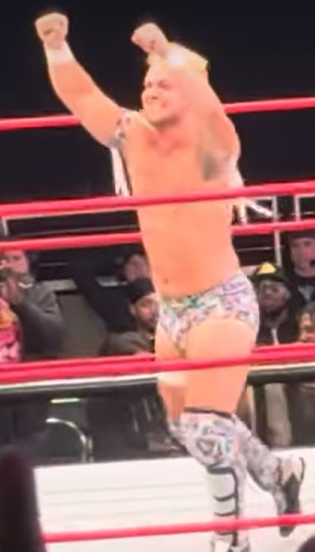
Cartwheel at Ring of Honor's Final Battle 2023.

=== All Elite Wrestling / Ring of Honor (2023–2024) ===
On March 3, 2023, he made his All Elite Wrestling (AEW) debut on the YouTube-exclusive Dark program, losing to Konosuke Takeshita. He made his AEW television debut on March 8, 2023, on Rampage, teaming with Starboy Charlie in a losing effort against The Acclaimed. At Ring of Honor's Final Battle on December 15, Cartwheel wrestled in the ROH World Television Championship Survival of the Fittest eliminator match, losing to Bryan Keith. On May 16, 2024, he made his Collision debut, losing to Nick Wayne.

=== WWE; Lucha Libre AAA Worldwide (2024–present) ===
On November 7, 2024, WWE announced that Summit was one of the first independent wrestlers selected for their WWE ID program. On the March 5, 2025 episode of Evolve, Summit, as Jack Cartwheel, Sean Legacy and Cappuccino Jones defeated Jackson Drake and Swipe Right (Brad Baylor and Ricky Smokes) in a six-man tag team match in Evolve's first main event after its revival in WWE. Cartwheel continued to team with Jones and solidified their tag team partnership as Adrenaline Drip as they target the Evolve Tag Team Championship. In late 2025, Cartwheel wrestled in WWE sister promotion Lucha Libre AAA World Wide (AAA), where he challenged for the AAA World Cruiserweight Championship twice. In late May 2026, Cartwheel announced that he has permanently signed with AAA.

== Personal life ==
Summit is Jewish.

== Championships and accomplishments ==
- Pro Wrestling Illustrated
  - Ranked No. 327 of the top 500 singles wrestlers in the PWI 500 in 2024
