= Sean Legacy =

American professional wrestler (born 1995)

Personal information
- Born: Sean Rossini; November 28, 1995 (age 30) Evans, Georgia, United States

Professional wrestling career
- Ring name: "Super" Sean Legacy
- Billed height: 5 ft 11 in (1.80 m)
- Billed weight: 207 lb (94 kg)
- Billed from: Evans, Georgia
- Debut: October 29, 2016

Sean Rossini (born November 28, 1995), better known by the ring name Sean Legacy, is an American professional wrestler. He is signed to WWE, where performs on the NXT brand.

Rossini has also competed across the independent wrestling circuit and appeared in promotions including All Elite Wrestling, wXw, GWF and Pro Wrestling NOAH.

== Early life ==
Sean Rossini was born on November 28, 1995, in Evans, Georgia. He attended Evans High School, where he was involved in athletics and developed an early passion for physical fitness and performance. Growing up, Rossini was a fan of professional wrestling and admired larger-than-life characters in WWE, which inspired him to pursue a career in the industry.

== Professional wrestling career ==
=== Independent circuit (2016–2025) ===
Rossini made his professional wrestling debut on October 29, 2016, under the ring name Sean Legacy. He wrestled for several American independent promotions. He also competed in singles action on an episode of AEW Dark in 2020, facing Will Hobbs. Legacy had a short stint working for Pro Wrestling Noah, including an appearance at the All Together event, where he teamed with Chris Ridgeway to defeat TMDK (Zack Sabre Jr. and Kosei Fujita).

In July 2025, Legacy was announced as one of the six finalist in the tournament to crown the inaugural WWE ID Men's Championship.

=== WWE (2024–present) ===
In late 2024, Legacy was announced as part of WWE ID Program, which seeks to recruit standout talent from the independent scene. On the March 5, 2025 episode of Evolve, Legacy, Jack Cartwheel and Cappuccino Jones defeated Jackson Drake and Swipe Right (Brad Baylor and Ricky Smokes) in a six-man tag team match in Evolve's first main event after its revival in WWE. He made his televised NXT debut on the May 6 episode of NXT in a number one contenders battle royal for the NXT Championship, which was eventually won by Myles Borne. Legacy impressed during the battle royal, including a sequence with Je'Von Evans, who would eliminate him. On May 21 episode of NXT , Legacy picked up a significant victory in a triple threat match against Evans and Ashante "Thee" Adonis to earn himself a future NXT North American Championship match but failed to defeat Ethan Page for the title three weeks later. On the June 4 episode of Evolve, Legacy participated in a fatal four-way elimination match to crown the inaugural Evolve Champion, where he was the last person to be eliminated by the inaugural champion Jackson Drake.. Legacy challenge for Evolve title on the December 25th edition of NXT but was unsuccessful to defeat Jackson Drake for the gold.

On January 20, 2026, it was announced that Legacy had officially joined the NXT roster.

== Championships and accomplishments ==
- Pro Wrestling Illustrated
  - Ranked No. 162 of the top 500 singles wrestlers in the PWI 500 in 2025
- Southern Honor Wrestling
  - SHW Southern States Championship (1 time)
- Viral Pro Wrestling
  - Garden City Classic Winner (2019)
