= Brad Baylor =

American professional wrestler (born 2004)

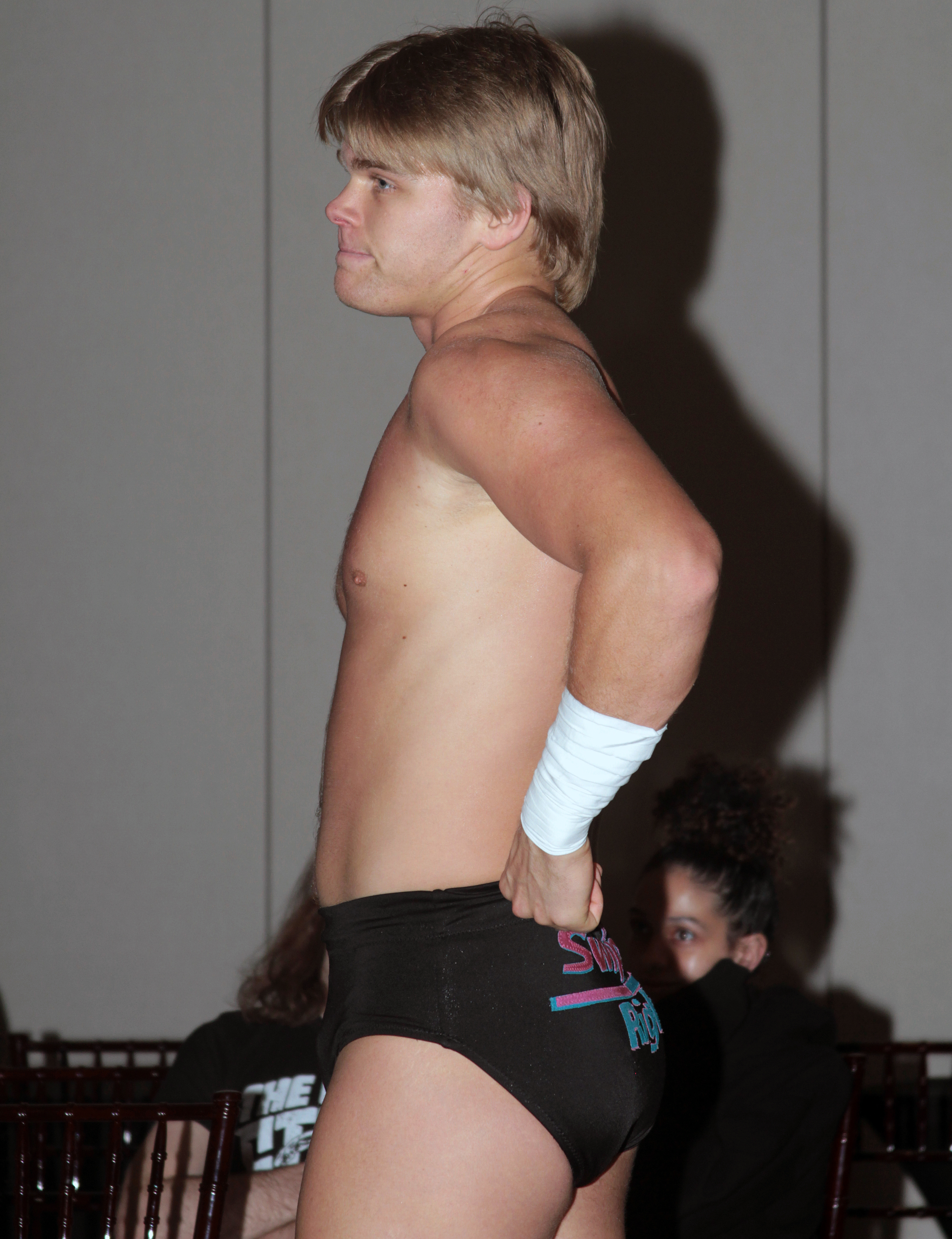
- Baylor in 2025

Personal information
- Born: Brad Baylor; November 8, 2004 (age 22) Fairfield, Connecticut, U.S.

Professional wrestling career
- Ring name: Brad Baylor
- Billed height: 6 ft 3 in (191 cm)
- Billed weight: 215 lb (98 kg)
- Trained by: Paul Roma
- Debut: August 28, 2021

Brad Baylor (born November 8, 2004) is an American professional wrestler. He is signed to WWE, where he performs on the NXT brand. He is one-half of the Swipe Right tag team alongside Ricky Smokes as members of The Vanity Project stable. Baylor and Smokes are the reigning NXT Tag Team Champions in their second reign as a team and individually.

== Career ==
=== Independent circuit (2021–2026) ===
Baylor started his wrestling career in the independent circuit in 2021 and was trained by Paul Roma. In 2023, Baylor formed a tag team with Ricky Smokes as Swipe Right.

In July 2025, Baylor was announced as one of the six finalist in the tournament to crown the inaugural WWE ID Men's Championship. Baylor lost to Jack Cartwheel in the tournament semi-final at WWN x HOC ID Showcase on July 19.

=== WWE (2024–present) ===
In November 2024, it was reported that Baylor had signed for WWE under the WWE ID program. On the March 5, 2025 episode of Evolve, Swipe Right (Baylor and Ricky Smokes) and Jackson Drake lost to Jack Cartwheel, Sean Legacy and Cappuccino Jones in a six-man tag team match in Evolve's first main event after its revival in WWE. On the April 8 episode of NXT, Swipe Right wrestled their NXT debut match, where they lost to NXT Tag Team Champions Nathan Frazer and Axiom in a tag team match. In the same month, Swipe Right and Drake formed The Vanity Project stable with Bryce Donovan and Zayda Steel.

On January 13, 2026 episode of NXT, The Vanity Project (except Donovan and Steel, who had left WWE) were promoted to the NXT brand. On the following week, Baylor and Smokes defeated Chase University (Kale Dixon and Uriah Connors) in their first match as part of the NXT roster. On the February 24 episode of NXT, Baylor and Smokes defeated NXT Tag Team Champions DarkState (Osiris Griffin and Saquon Shugars) for the titles after interference from Tony D'Angelo.

== Championships and accomplishments ==
- Alpha-1 Wrestling
  - A1 Tag Team Championship (1 time) – with Ricky Smokes
- Beyond Wrestling
  - Wrestling Open Tag Team Championship (1 time) – with Ricky Smokes
- Northeast Wrestling
  - NEW Tag Team Championship (1 time) – with Ricky Smokes
- Paradise Alley Pro Wrestling
  - King of Paradise Tournament (2022)
- WWE
  - NXT Tag Team Championship (2 times, current) – with Ricky Smokes
