= Kylie Rae =

American professional wrestler

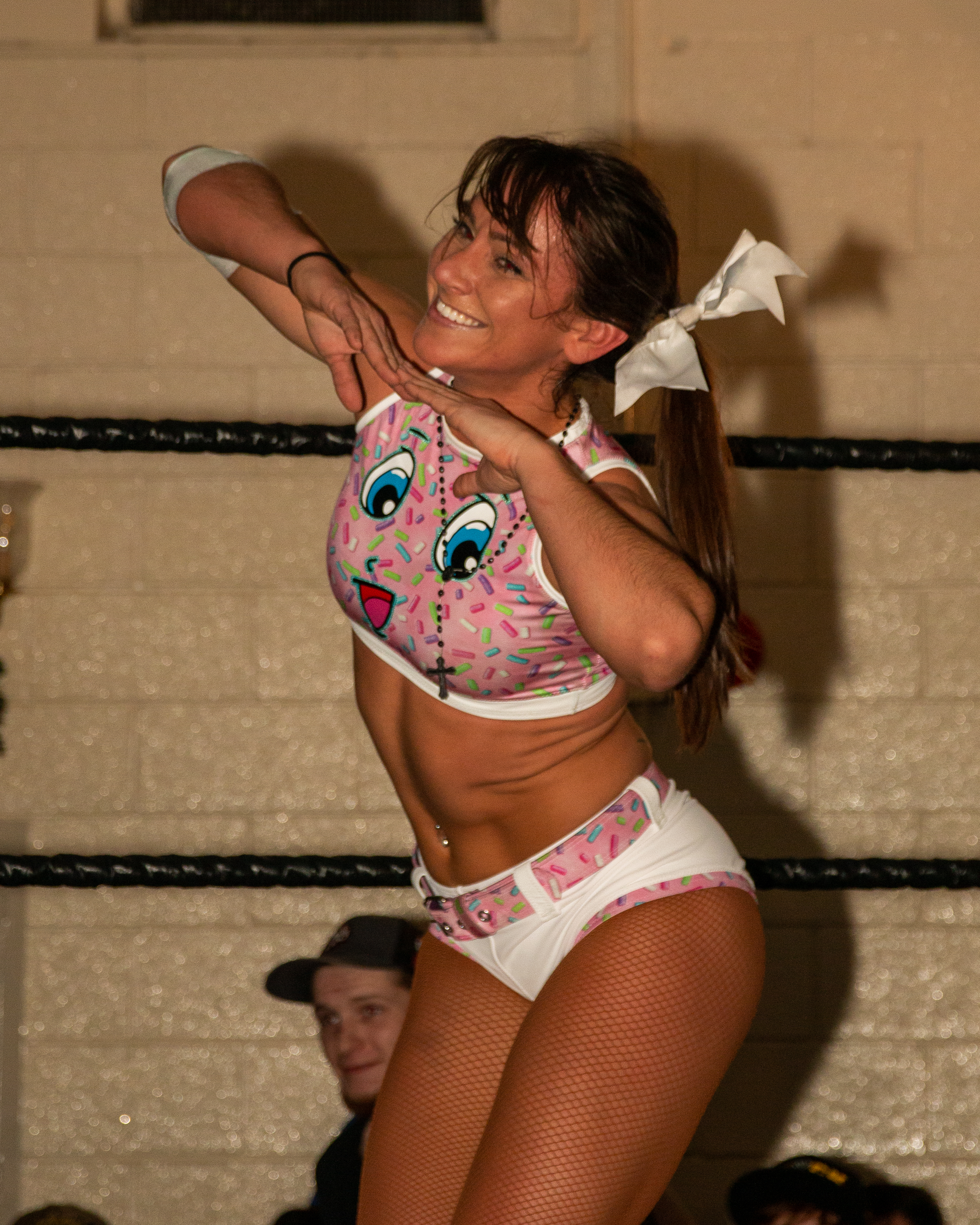
- Rae in December 2019

Personal information
- Born: Briana Rae Sparrey; August 25, 1992 (age 34) Oak Forest, Illinois, U.S.
- Education: Lewis University; Governors State University
- Life partner: Isaias Velazquez (engaged)
- Children: 2

Professional wrestling career
- Ring name(s): Briana Ray; Kylie Rae
- Billed height: 5 ft 5 in (165 cm)
- Billed weight: 138 lb (63 kg)
- Billed from: Chicago, Illinois
- Trained by: Bryce Benjamin; Booker T
- Debut: March 19, 2016

Briana Rae Sparrey (born August 25, 1992), better known by the ring name Kylie Rae, is an American professional wrestler. She is known for her time in All Elite Wrestling (AEW), Total Nonstop Action Wrestling (TNA), the National Wrestling Alliance (NWA), and WWE.

== Early life ==
Sparrey graduated from Oak Forest High School in 2010 where she played softball.

Before becoming a full-time professional wrestler, she also worked as a stuntwoman, performing stunts for the film Divergent and the TV series Shameless.

== Professional wrestling career ==
=== Independent circuit (2016–present) ===
Sparrey made her professional wrestling debut at a March 19, 2016 Reality of Wrestling TV taping under the ring name Kylie Rae, defeating Ivory Robin to win the ROW Diamonds Championship. Sparrey received a tryout with WWE in February 2018.

On January 5, 2019, at Warrior Wrestling 3, Rae challenged Jordynne Grace for the Progress World Women's Championship but was defeated.

On September 21, 2019, Rae made her return to Freelance Wrestling, defeating Isaias Velazquez. On September 12, 2020, Rae defeated Tessa Blanchard to win the Warrior Wrestling Women's Championship.

Kylie Rae returned to pro wrestling on June 5, 2021, defeating Holidead at Warrior Wrestling's Stadium Series in Chicago, Illinois. She lost Warrior Wrestling Women's Championship to Thunder Rosa on August 21, 2021. Rae made her UK debut for Revolution Pro Wrestling on May 22, 2022, where she was defeated by Alex Windsor for the Undisputed British Women's Championship. She made her New Japan Pro-Wrestling debut at Rumble on 44th Street on October 28, 2022, where she teamed with Tiara James and defeated Mina Shirakawa and Waka Tsukiyama.

=== All Elite Wrestling (2019) ===
In early 2019, Rae became part of the women's roster at All Elite Wrestling (AEW). She debuted in the promotion's inaugural event, Double or Nothing, in a match with Britt Baker, Awesome Kong, and Nyla Rose in a losing effort. Rae was advertised to compete against Leva Bates at Fyter Fest; however, she was replaced by Allie. During a media scrum after All Out, Tony Khan announced that Rae had requested her release which was subsequently granted, and that the split was "very amicable".

=== Impact Wrestling (2019–2021) ===
On October 20, 2019, Rae made a surprise appearance at Impact Wrestling's Bound For Glory pay-per-view. She entered #17 in the "Call Your Shot" Gauntlet Match and was eliminated by Mahabali Shera. On March 6, 2020, Rae defeated Cassandra Golden as part of Impact Wrestling's TV tapings in Atlanta. On the March 31 episode of Impact!, it was announced that Rae had signed a long-term deal with Impact Wrestling. Rae defeated Kiera Hogan during Night 1 of Rebellion on April 21. On the May 26 episode of Impact!, she aligned herself with Susie after they were bullied and beaten up by Hogan and Tasha Steelz, leading to a tag team match the next week, where they lost after Hogan pinned Susie with a swinging fisherman suplex.

On July 18 at Slammiversary, Rae won a Gauntlet for the Gold match to become #1 contender to the Impact Knockouts Championship. On the July 28 episode of Impact!, she joined a bunch of wrestlers in the reality show Wrestle House. During that time, Rae got into a feud with Rosemary and Taya Valkyrie, beating them in singles matches on the August 4 episode of Impact! and Night 1 of Emergence on August 18 respectively. On the September 1 episode of Impact!, she and the rest of the Wrestle House cast returned to the Impact Zone during Knockouts Champion Deonna Purrazzo's Black Tie Affair, attacking Kimber Lee, who was stopped by Susie. During the following weeks, Rae feuded with the Knockout Champion Deonna Purrazzo leading to their scheduled match at Bound for Glory. However, Rae did not appear at the event and was replaced by Su Yung. Two weeks later, she announced her retirement from professional wrestling due to mental health issues. However, Rae would return to wrestling a few months later with National Wrestling Alliance, being allowed by Impact.

=== National Wrestling Alliance (2021–2022) ===
On June 6, 2021, Rae and Taryn Terrell defeated Thunder Rosa and Melina Perez at NWA When Our Shadows Fall. It was announced that Kylie Rae had signed a contract with the National Wrestling Alliance (NWA). Rae made her NWA singles debut in the main event of the June 29 episode of NWA Powerrr, defeating the villainous Melina Perez. Rae lost to Mickie James at NWA 73 by pinfall. Rae was part of a three-way NWA World Women's Championship match at the 2022 Crockett Cup but was pinned by Kamille.

=== WWE (2022; 2024–2025) ===
==== Enhancement talent (2022) ====
In December 2022, Sparrey attended a week-long WWE tryout in Orlando, Florida. This marked her second tryout with the company with her first one taking place in February 2018. During the tryout, she worked two matches against current NXT talents, Fallon Henley and Thea Hail. She also made her official WWE in-ring debut under the name Briana Ray on the December 15, 2022 episode of Main Event, losing to Dana Brooke.

==== Evolve (2024–2025) ====
Sparrey would occasionally be brought back in by the company to work as an extra but was never signed to a contract until November 26, 2024, when she got signed to WWE as part of WWE ID. Sparrey, as Kylie Rae, made her Evolve debut on the March 12, 2025 episode losing to Zara Zakher. After the match, Zakher and Rae shook hands and formed a partnership. Right after, Wendy Choo handed Rae a teddy bear and a note, starting a storyline between the two. In the weeks after, Choo kept giving Rae gifts consisting of teddy bears and blankets. On the April 2 episode of Evolve, Rae was defeated by Choo. On the May 28 episode of Evolve, Rae participated in the fatal four-way elimination match to crown the inaugural Evolve Women's Champion, where she eliminated Choo but was the last woman to be eliminated by the inaugural champion Kali Armstrong. On the June 25 episode of Evolve, Rae defeated Choo in the brand's first ever Last Woman Standing match to end their feud.

On August 1, 2025, at Game Changer Wrestling (GCW) ID Showcase, Rae defeated Zara Zakher and Zayda Steel in a triple threat match in the tournament final to become the inaugural WWE Women's ID Champion. On September 22, the day after publicly announcing her pregnancy, WWE ID vacated the Women's ID Championship. On October 9, Rae announced that her WWE ID contract had expired and would not be renewed.

== Personal life ==
Sparrey is engaged to fellow professional wrestler Isaias Velazquez, with whom she has two children.

== Championships and accomplishments ==
- AAW Wrestling
  - AAW Women's Championship (1 time)
- Black Label Pro
  - BLP Midwest Championship (1 time)
- Brew City Wrestling
  - BCW Ladies Championship (1 time)
- Capital Wrestling Alliance
  - CWA Championship (1 time)
  - Raven Black Memorial Tournament (2018)
- Freelance Wrestling
  - Freelance World Championship (3 times)
- Impact Wrestling
  - Gauntlet for the Gold (2020 – Knockouts)
- Making Towns Wrestling (MTW)
  - Making Towns Classic Tournament (2018)
- Rise Wrestling
  - Phoenix of Rise Championship (1 time)
  - Rise Year-End Award (1 time)
    - Match of the Year (2019) vs. Mercedes Martinez in a no ropes submission match on RISE 13: Legendary
- Pro Wrestling Illustrated
  - Ranked No. 19 of the top 100 female wrestlers in the PWI Women's 100 in 2020
  - Ranked No. 78 of the top 500 wrestlers in the PWI 500 in 2020
- Reality of Wrestling
  - ROW Diamonds Division Championship (3 times)
- Relentless Wrestling
  - Relentless Northwest Pacific Championship (1 time)
- Sabotage Wrestling
  - War of the Genders Championship (1 time)
- Warrior Wrestling
  - Warrior Wrestling Women's Championship (1 time)
- WWE
  - WWE Women's ID Championship (1 time, inaugural)
  - WWE Women's ID Championship Tournament (2025)
- Zelo Pro Wrestling
  - Zelo Pro Women's Championship (2 times)
