= WWE Women's ID Championship =

Professional wrestling championship

- The WWE Women's ID Championship belt with default side plates.

Details
- Promotion: WWE; Independent circuit
- Date established: February 18, 2025
- Current champion: Monica Monroe
- Date won: October 3, 2026
Statistics
- First champion: Kylie Rae
- Longest reign: Laynie Luck (320 days)
- Shortest reign: Kylie Rae (52 days)

The WWE Women's ID Championship is a women's professional wrestling championship created and promoted by the American company WWE for their Independent Development (ID) program. Unlike WWE's other titles, both the men's and women's ID championships are exclusively defended on the independent circuit and open to all independent wrestlers. The current champion is Monica Monroe, who is in her first reign. She won the title by defeating Laynie Luck in a Winner Takes All match at Reality of Wrestling Rise to Wrestling Royalty on October 3, 2026 in which Monroe's ROW Women's Championship was also on the line; as a result, Monroe earned a WWE ID contract.

WWE ID is designed to provide a pathway for independent wrestlers to transition into WWE. Both the men's and women's ID championships were established on February 18, 2025, and if a non-WWE ID wrestler wins either title, they receive a WWE ID contract.

== History ==
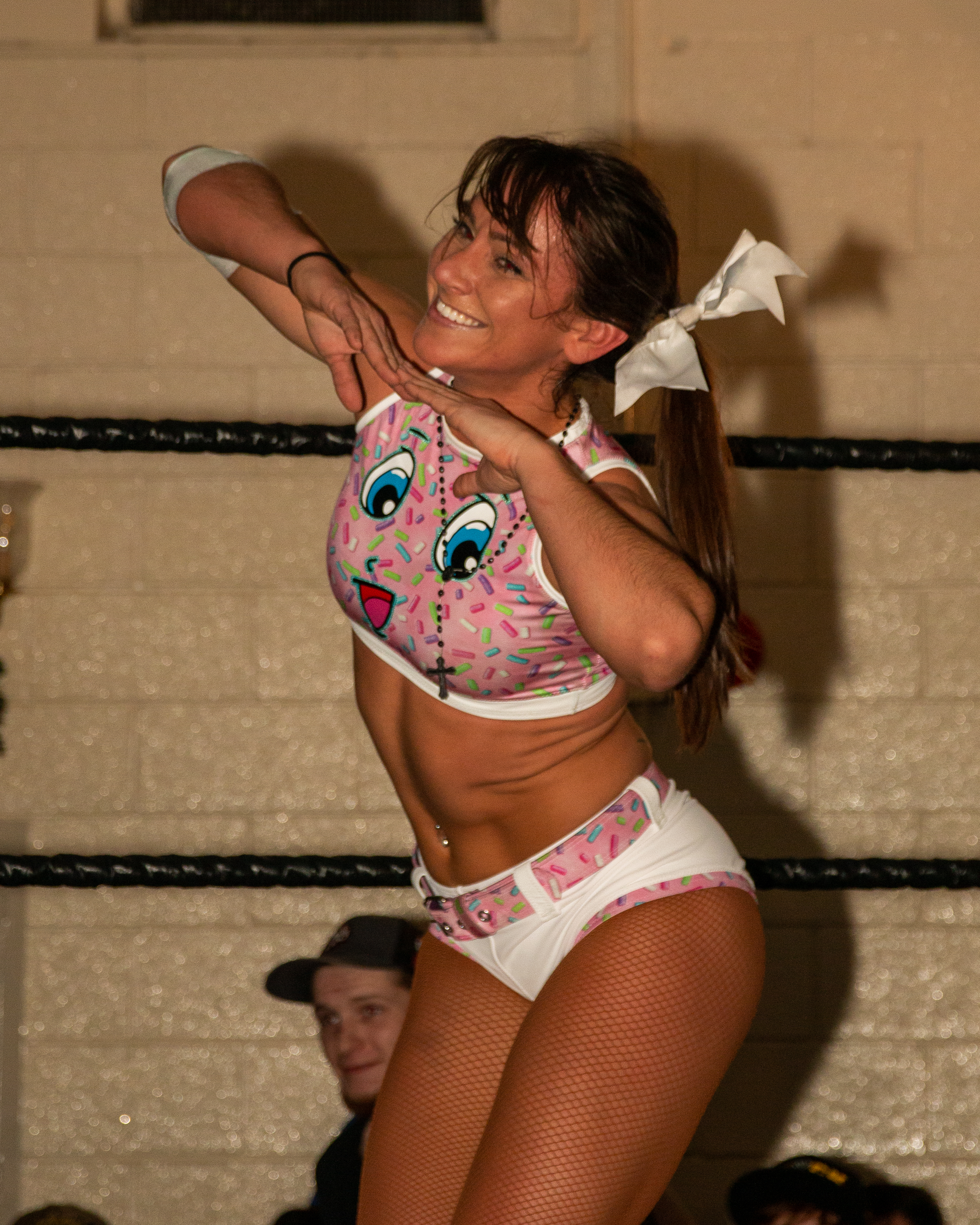
Inaugural champion Kylie Rae

In October 2024, the American professional wrestling company WWE introduced the Independent Development (ID) program, similar to their Next in Line (NIL) program for college athletes, with ID to support the development of independent wrestlers by collaborating with various wrestling schools and promotions on the independent circuit. The inaugural partner promotions and schools confirmed were Reality of Wrestling, Black and Brave Academy, Nightmare Factory, Elite Pro Wrestling Training Center, and KnokX Pro Academy.

During a press conference on February 18, 2025, WWE's Chief Content Officer, Paul "Triple H" Levesque, unveiled men's and women's WWE ID Championships. The titles were designed to be defended exclusively across the independent circuit, offering emerging talent increased exposure and opportunities. The inaugural champions were determined through a tournament featuring top prospects from the WWE ID program. The tournament matches were scheduled to take place at various independent wrestling shows, highlighting WWE's collaboration with the independent wrestling scene. Participants of the inaugural tournament were all WWE ID prospects, and first round matches were held by Game Changer Wrestling (GCW) on April 16 and Future Stars of Wrestling on April 18 during WrestleMania 41 week. It was then confirmed that after the crowning of the inaugural champions, all independent wrestlers would be eligible to challenge for the ID Championships and that if a non-WWE ID wrestler were to win either title, they would receive a WWE ID contract.

The women's tournament format was a round-robin tournament. On July 8, 2025, it was confirmed that the tournament final would be held at GCW's event, The ID Showcase, on August 1 during SummerSlam week. The tournament final was a triple threat match between Kylie Rae, Zara Zakher, and Zayda Steel, which Rae won to become the inaugural Women's ID Champion. Her reign would be cut short as just over a month later, the title was vacated after Rae's public announcement of her second pregnancy.

== Design ==
The WWE Women's ID Championship belt is identical to the men's version, albeit smaller and on a white strap. It features a modern design, incorporating elements that represent both WWE and the independent wrestling scene. The center plate prominently displays the WWE ID logo, flanked by customizable side plates that can be personalized by the reigning champion.

== Reigns ==
As of October 8, 2026, there have been three reigns and one vacancy. Kylie Rae was the inaugural champion. Laynie Luck's reign is the longest at 320 days, while Rae has the shortest reign at 52 days.

Monica Monroe is the current champion in her first reign. She won the title by defeating Laynie Luck in a Winner Takes All match at Reality of Wrestling Rise to Wrestling Royalty in Texas City, Texas on October 3, 2026 in which Monroe's ROW Women's Championship was also on the line; as a result, Monroe earned a WWE ID contract.

Key
No.	Overall reign number
Reign	Reign number for the specific champion
Days	Number of days held
+	Current reign is changing daily

No.	Champion	Championship change			Reign statistics		Notes	Ref.
No.	Champion	Date	Event	Location	Reign	Days	Notes	Ref.
WWE: ID
1	Kylie Rae	August 1, 2025	The ID Showcase	Rutherford, NJ	1	52	This was a Game Changer Wrestling event. Defeated Zara Zakher and Zayda Steel in a tournament final triple threat match to become the inaugural champion.	
—	Vacated	September 22, 2025	—	—	—	—	The title was vacated due to Kylie Rae going on maternity leave.	
2	Laynie Luck	November 17, 2025	Wrestling Open RI 33	Cranston, RI	1	320	This was a Beyond Wrestling event. Defeated Airica Demia, Brittnie Brooks, Notorious Mimi, Tiara James, and Shannon LeVangie in a six-woman elimination match to win the vacant title. Laynie also earned a WWE ID contract.	
3	Monica Monroe	October 3, 2026	Rise to Wrestling Royalty	Texas City, TX	1	5+	This was a Winner Takes All match also for Monroe's ROW Women's Championship; this was a Reality of Wrestling event. Monroe also earned a WWE ID contract.	
