= Bryce Donovan =

American professional wrestler (born 1998)

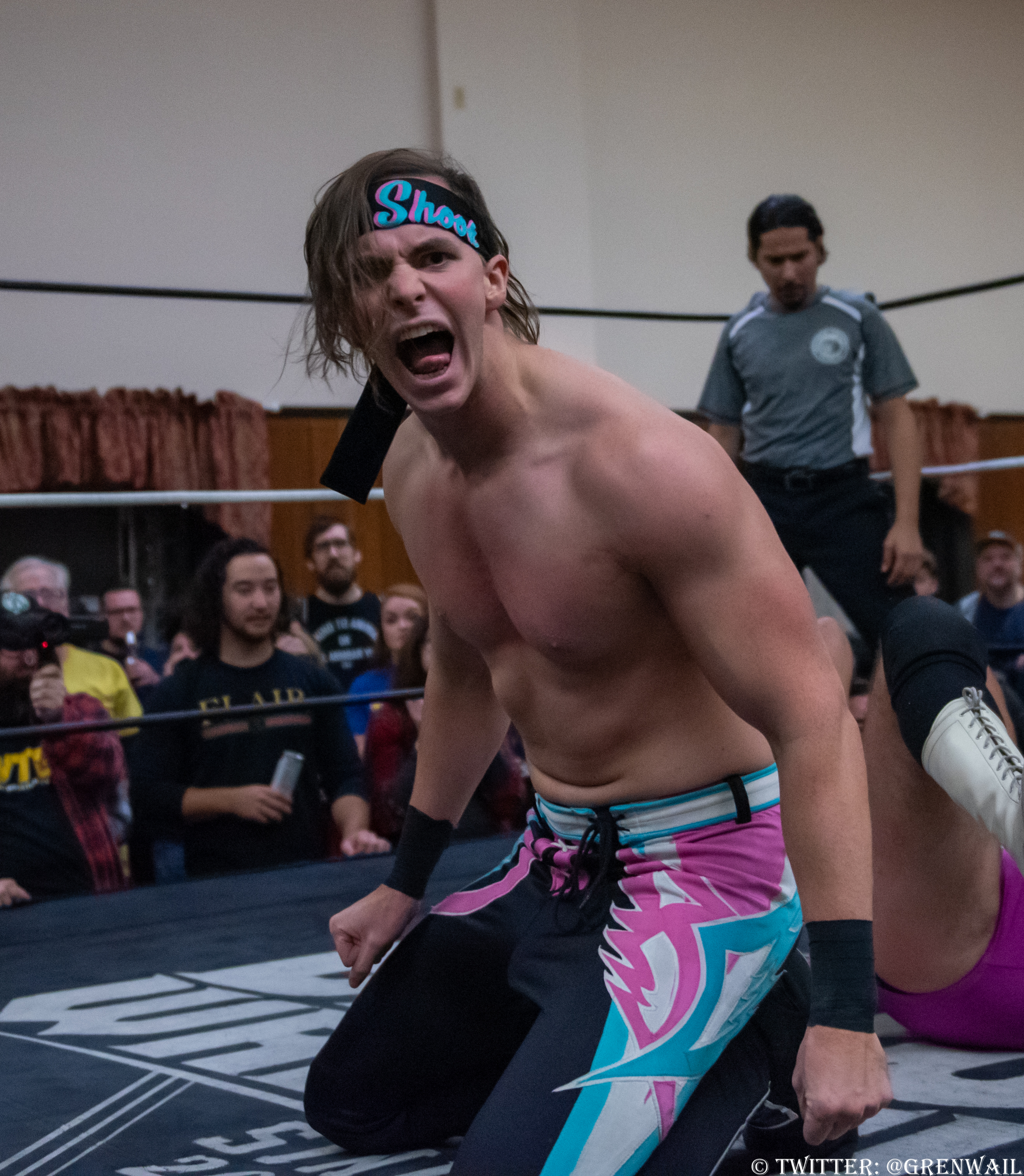
- Donovan in December 2019

Personal information
- Born: Brison Farner; February 10, 1998 (age 28) Long Beach, New York, U.S.

Professional wrestling career
- Ring name(s): Chance Paradoxx; Bryce Donovan
- Billed height: 6’ 6” (198 cm)
- Billed weight: 230 lb (104 kg)
- Trained by: Brian Myers; Pat Buck
- Debut: 2016

Brison Farner is an American professional wrestler, better known by his ring name Bryce Donovan. He currently works on the independent circuit. Donovan is also known for his time in WWE under their WWE ID program, through which he performed on the Evolve brand.

== Professional wrestling career ==
=== American independent circuit (2016–present) ===
Farner would perform on many different shows which included CZW from 2017 to 2018, AEW from 2021 to 2022, ROH in early 2024 and finally on WWE from November 2024 before being assigned to Evolve in March 2025. He announced his departure from WWE in October 2025.

== Championships and accomplishments ==
- Alpha-1 Wrestling
  - A1 Tag Team Championship (1 time) with VSK
- Beyond Wrestling
  - Wrestling Open Championship (1 time)
  - Eliminator Cup Tag Team Championship (1 time) – with Bobby Orlando
- Create A Pro Wrestling
  - CAP Championship (1 time)
  - CAP Tag Team Championship (3 times) – with Bobby Orlando (1), Max Caster (1) and Evil Kip (1)
- Pro Wrestling Illustrated
  - Ranked No. 340 of the top singles wrestlers in the PWI 500 in 2026
- Victory Pro Wrestling
  - VPW Championship (2 times)
  - VPW Tag Team Championship (2 times) – with Johnny Curtis (1) and Bobby Orlando (1)
- Women Superstars United
  - WSU Spirit Championship (1 time, final)
