= Jackson Drake =

American professional wrestler (born 2003)

Personal information
- Born: Jackson Drake; August 30, 2003 (age 23) Greensboro, North Carolina, U.S.

Professional wrestling career
- Ring name(s): Drake Thompson; Jackson Drake
- Billed height: 6 ft 2 in (1.88 m)
- Billed weight: 188 lb (85 kg)
- Trained by: Cam Carter; LaBron Kozone
- Debut: June 28, 2017

Jackson Drake (born August 30, 2003) is an American professional wrestler. As of November 2024, he is signed to WWE, where he performs under his real name on the NXT brand and is the leader of The Vanity Project stable. He is the current NXT North American Champion in his first reign. He is also a former one-time, and the inaugural and longest-reigning WWE Evolve Champion.

== Professional wrestling career ==
=== Training and debut (2017–2026) ===
Drake debuted on the independent circuit in 2017 after being trained by Cam Carter and LaBron Kozone. In 2019, he formed a tag team with Jay Malachi called the Wrestling Prodigies, winning the FSPW Tag Team Championship and PWF Tag Team Championship. He also made appearances for AEW between 2022 and 2024, wrestling at least one match each year., on January 15, 2026 Drake announced he would no longer take independent bookings moving forward.

=== WWE (2023–present) ===
Drake previously made a one-off appearance for WWE under the ring name Drake Thompson on the May 15, 2023 of Raw, teaming with Lavar Barbie in a losing effort against Indus Sher (Sanga and Veer).

On November 15, 2024, it was reported that Drake had signed with WWE as part of the WWE ID program. He joined the Evolve brand under his real name. On March 5, 2025, he competed on the first episode of Evolve. On the April 23 episode of Evolve, Drake, Bryce Donovan, Zayda Steel, and Swipe Right (Brad Baylor and Ricky Smokes) joined together to form a stable called The Vanity Project. On the June 4 episode of Evolve, he defeated Sean Legacy, Edris Enofe, and Keanu Carver in a fatal four-way elimination match to become the inaugural WWE Evolve Men's Champion. On January 13, 2026, Drake, Baylor and Smokes were moved to the NXT brand. During the March 18 episode of Evolve (taped February 20), Drake defended the WWE Evolve Championship one last time as a member of the Evolve brand before moving to NXT full-time, where he lost the title to Aaron Rourke, ending his reign at a record-setting 301 days (287 days as recognized by WWE due to tape delay).

Drake battled Jasper Troy and won thanks to the assistance from Myka Lockwood on May 5. At NXT Heatwave on August 30, Drake defeated Myles Borne for the NXT North American Championship, making Drake the youngest champion in the title's history, on his 23rd birthday.

== Championships and accomplishments ==
- Elevation Pro Wrestling
  - Elevation Pro Heavyweight Championship (1 time)
- Fire Star Pro Wrestling
  - FSPW Heavyweight Championship (1 time)
  - FSPW South Eastern Championship (1 time)
  - FSPW Tag Team Championship (1 time) – with Jay Malachi
- Premier Wrestling Federation
  - PWF Tag Team Championship (2 time) – with Jay Malachi
- Pro Wrestling Illustrated
  - Ranked No. 153 of the top 500 singles wrestlers in the PWI 500 in 2025
- WWE
  - NXT North American Championship (1 time, current)
  - WWE Evolve Championship (1 time, inaugural)
