= Beyond Wrestling =

Independent professional wrestling promotion

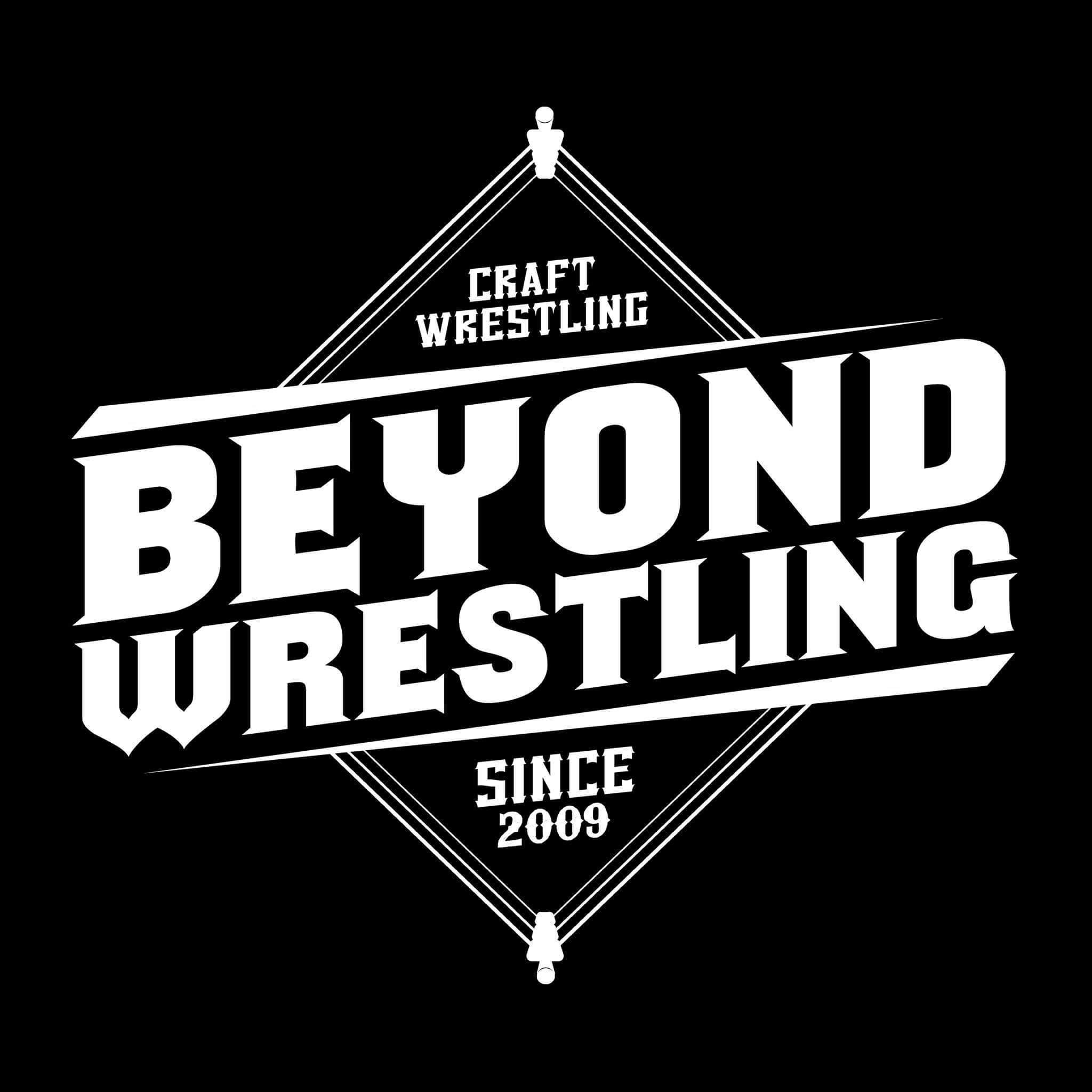
- Beyond Wrestling logo, c. 2018
- Founded: 2009
- Headquarters: Worcester, Massachusetts, United States
- Founder: Drew Cordeiro
- Website: https://www.beyondwrestlingonline.com/

Beyond Wrestling is an independent professional wrestling promotion based out of Worcester, Massachusetts in the United States. Established in 2009 by Drew Cordeiro, by the late 2010s it had established a reputation as a place for aspiring professional wrestlers to develop their skills before seeking employment with national-level promotions such as All Elite Wrestling or WWE. Between 2019 and 2021 Beyond Wrestling produced a weekly televised programme called Uncharted Territory which aired on the streaming platform IndependentWrestling.tv. In 2022, Beyond Wrestling began producing weekly "Wrestling Open" events; shows intended to be the professional wrestling equivalent of open mic nights in which inexperienced performers can take part and develop themselves. In 2023 Beyond Wrestling announced the creation of their own professional wrestling school, named the "Beyond Institute of Pro Wrestling" (BIO) and coached by Kenn Doane.

== History and features ==
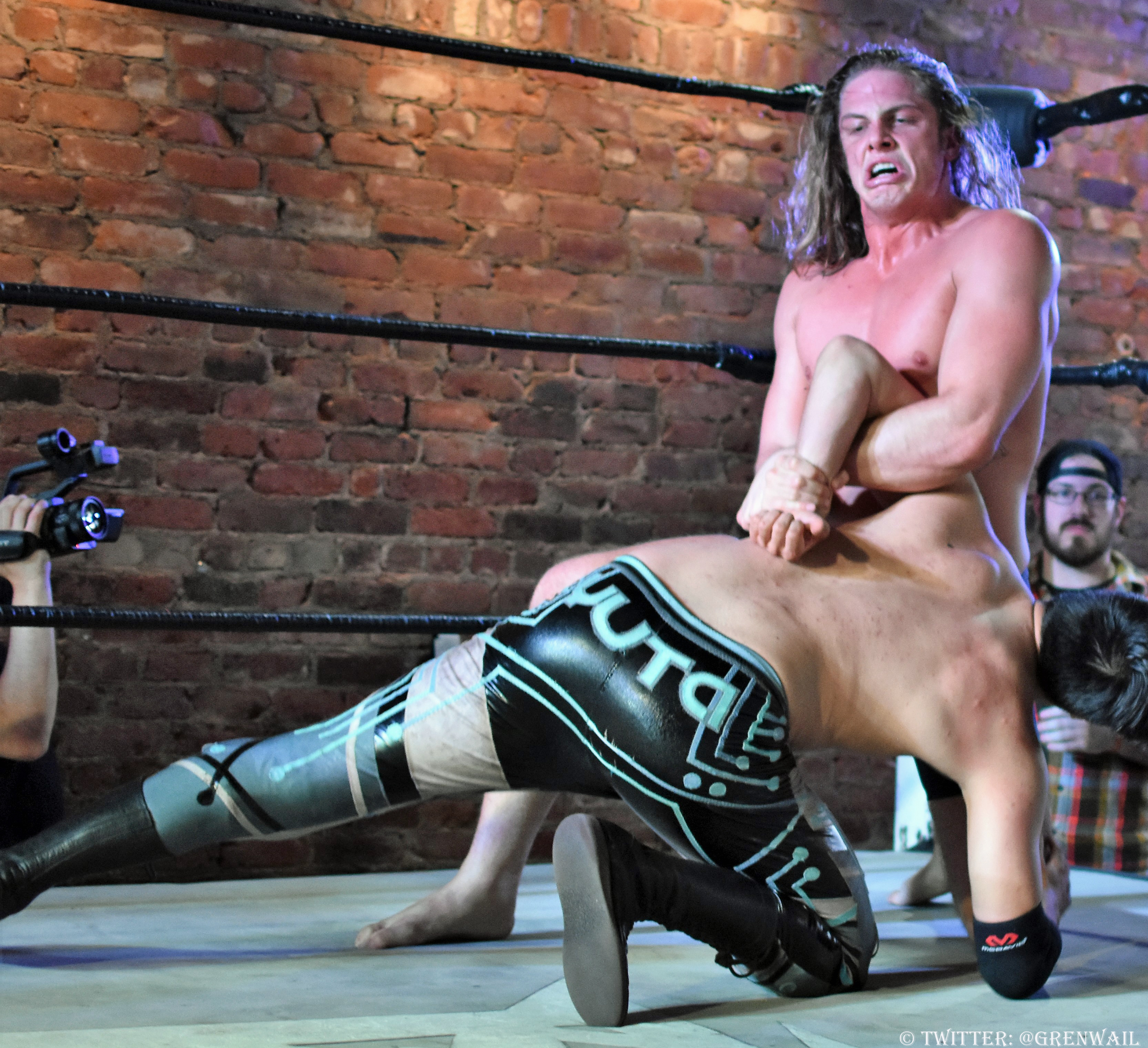
Matt Riddle and Wheeler Yuta exchange holds during a match for Beyond Wrestling in 2018

Beyond Wrestling was founded in 2009 and was originally based out of Elyria, Ohio. Beginning in 2010, the promotion would move base multiple times thereafter, moving to Allentown, Pennsylvania and various other locations across Massachusetts until 2014, when it would relocate to Providence, Rhode Island. The promotion would change its primary location to Worcester, Massachusetts in 2017.

=== Uncharted Territory (2019 to 2021) ===
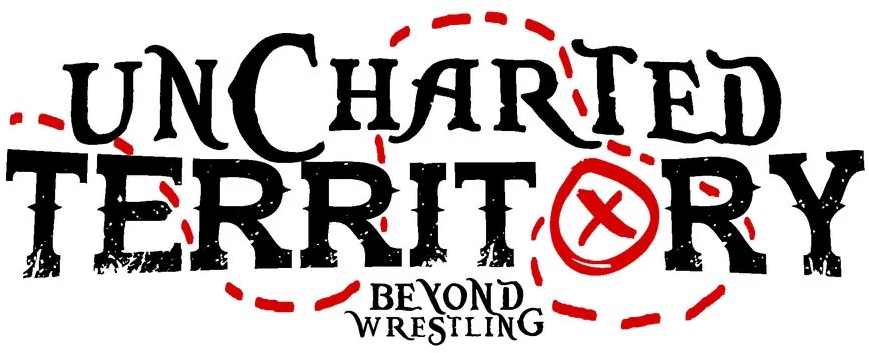
Uncharted Territory wordmark

In 2019 Beyond Wrestling announced the creation of a live, weekly professional wrestling program called Uncharted Territory. The programme was filmed live at Electric Haze bar in Worcester, Massachusetts and aired on streaming service IndependentWrestling.tv. In contrast to "traditional" weekly professional wrestling shows, promoter Drew Cordeiro stated the intention of the show was to capture the feel and atmosphere of Independent style professional wrestling and thus would focus primarily on in-ring action rather than speaking segments. Seasons typically revolved around wrestlers attempting to secure enough wins to advance to the Beyond Wrestling event Heavy Lies the Crown, held each year at the end of December.

Uncharted Territory ran for three seasons until December 2021 when its cessation was announced by Cordeiro, who wished to pivot towards a new concept called Wrestling Open, although the possibility of a fourth season was left open.

=== "Wrestling Open" events ===
In January 2022 Beyond Wrestling launched a new series of weekly events under the banner of "Wrestling Open", based out of the White Eagle pub in Worcester. Modelled on open mic nights, Wrestling Open events allow inexperienced professional wrestlers to participate in the show and gain experience by intermingling with more seasoned professionals. Although not paid the usual appearance fee that is customary in the professional wrestling industry, these performers are given a cut of "the gate"; the profits from admission to the event. These Wrestling Open events are separate from Beyond Wrestling's traditional monthly wrestling shows.

=== Wrestling School - "Beyond Institute of Pro Wrestling" ===
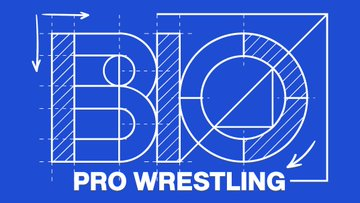
Wordmark of the Beyond Institute of Pro Wrestling

In January 2023 Beyond Wrestling launched the "Beyond Institute of Pro Wrestling" (BIO), to be coached/supervised by Kenn Doane. A former WWE performer, Doane is native to Massachusetts and himself a student of Killer Kowalski, who was a high-regarded professional wrestling trainer based in Malden, Massachusetts. Cordeiro stated the intention of the school was to form part of a complete chain of training for those new to professional wrestling; BIO would serve as the first stage, then wrestlers will graduate to Wrestling Open, and then finally official Beyond Wrestling shows as they develop.

== Championships used by WO and programming ==
=== Current Champions ===
Championship	Current champion(s)	Reign	Date won	Days held	Defenses	Location	Event	Previous champion(s)
Wrestling Open Championship	Bear Bronson	1	May 25, 2026	113+	3	Rhodes on the Pawtuxet Cranston, Rhode Island	The Last Stand	Brad Hollister
Wrestling Tag Team Championship	Stetson Ranch	1	November 14, 2024	667+	5	The Palladium Worcester, MA	Game Time	The Church of Greatness (Ichiban and Tyree Taylor)

Promotion	Championship	Last WO Reign	Time used in WO
IndependentWrestling.tv	IWTV Independent Wrestling Championship	Mance Warner	2022–present

=== Programming ===
Programming	Notes
IndependentWrestling.TV	(2022–) Syndicated, broadcast on IWTV.
