= WWE Recruit =

WWE's development systems

WWE Independent Development
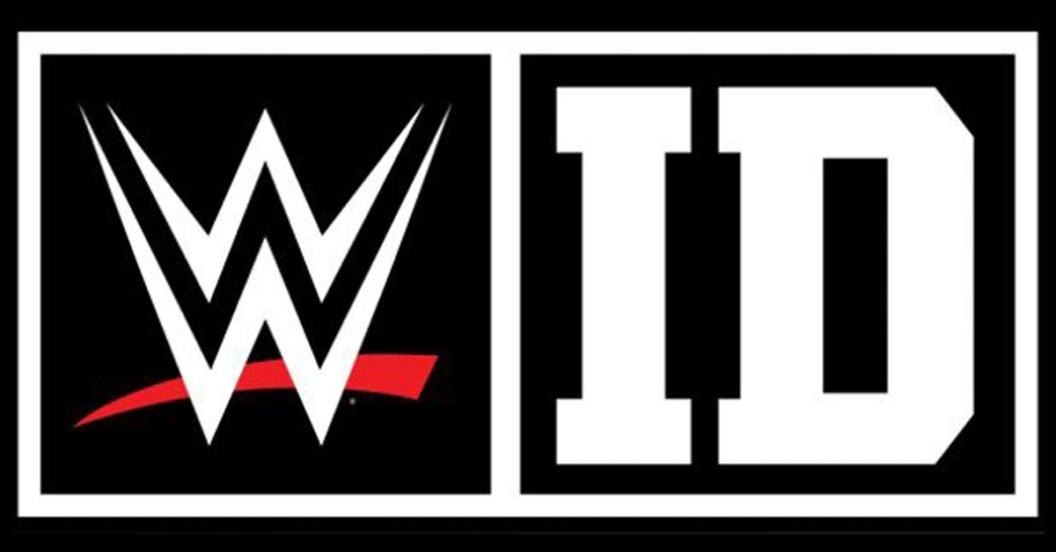
- Acronym: WWE ID
- Founder(s): Paul "Triple H" Levesque; Gabe Sapolsky
- Owner: TKO Group Holdings
- Parent: WWE
- Sister: WWE Next in Line
- Website: Official website

WWE Next in Line
- Acronym: WWE NIL
- Founder(s): Vince McMahon; Paul "Triple H" Levesque
- Owner: TKO Group Holdings
- Parent: WWE
- Sister: WWE Independent Development
- Website: Official website

WWE Recruit is a developmental system created by American professional wrestling promotion WWE. It includes the WWE Independent Development (WWE ID) and WWE Next in Line (WWE NIL) programs. The system supports the training and development of athletes at certain wrestling schools, wrestling promotions, and colleges.

On December 2, 2021, WWE established the WWE NIL program, which exclusively supports college athletes who decide to train as wrestlers. After the launch of WWE NIL, the WWE ID program was launched on October 29, 2024 to develop and support the training of independent professional wrestlers. The wrestling schools and promotions initially designated with WWE ID were Reality of Wrestling, Black and Brave Academy, Nightmare Factory, Elite Pro Wrestling Training Center, and KnokX Pro Academy. KnokX Pro Academy was later removed from the WWE ID program in August 2025.

== History ==
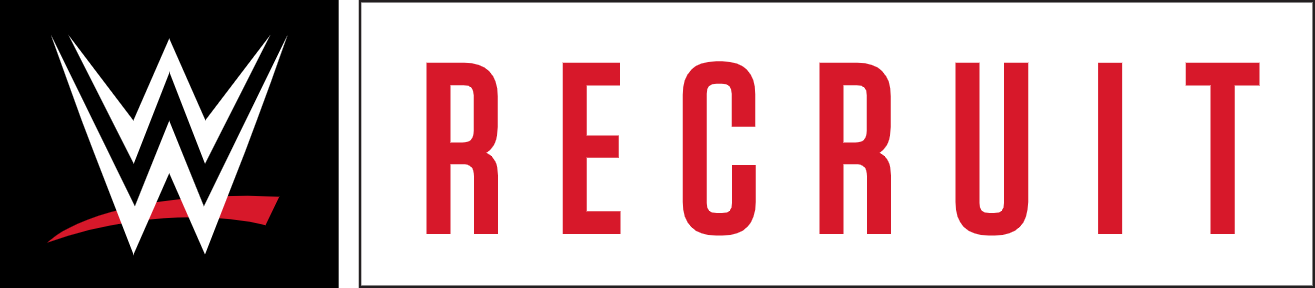
The logo of WWE Recruit

Prior to the 2020s, WWE had used several methods to train its future on-screen talent. This included partnering with other promotions to act as developmental territories, including Florida Championship Wrestling (FCW), Deep South Wrestling (DSW), and Ohio Valley Wrestling (OVW) among others. In 2010, WWE established NXT as an in-house televised developmental brand, which became the major pathway to the promotion's main roster.

In 2021, WWE established the WWE Next in Line (WWE NIL) program, which exclusively supports American-based college athletes who decide to train as wrestlers. The program was launched as an extension of NCAA-approved name, image, and likeness policies.

In June 2024, WWE trademarked WWE ID and WWE Independent Development with the purpose of organizing and conducting a program to help develop wrestlers. That October, WWE ID was officially announced, which would support the development of independent wrestlers at specified schools or promotions and provide them a pathway to the promotion. The first schools and promotions designated under WWE ID were Reality of Wrestling (run by Booker T), Black and Brave Academy (run by Seth Rollins and Marek Brave), Nightmare Factory (run by Cody Rhodes), Elite Pro Wrestling Training Center, and KnokX Pro Academy (run by Rikishi). On November 9, Fightful reported that Timothy Thatcher had been signed as the WWE ID trainer. In addition to Thatcher, it was later reported by Yahoo! Entertainment that Sean Waltman had been hired as an ID trainer.

On February 1, 2025, during the 2025 Royal Rumble, WWE announced the launch of WWE Evolve, a Tubi program based on the defunct independent Evolve promotion ran by WWE ID co-founder Gabe Sapolsky. The program, which premiered on March 5, 2025, features both WWE ID prospects and Performance Center trainees. On February 18, WWE chief content officer Paul "Triple H" Levesque announced the creation of the WWE ID Championship and Women's ID Championship – the championships will be defended in WWE and on the independent circuit. On August 1, during SummerSlam weekend, independent wrestling promotion Game Changer Wrestling held their WWE ID Showcase event at The Williams Center in Rutherford, New Jersey, which saw Cappuccino Jones crowned the inaugural ID Champion and Kylie Rae become the inaugural Women's ID Champion.

On August 23, 2025, an incident occurred at a WWE ID-affiliated KnokX Pro event, where Raja Jackson, son of former UFC Light Heavyweight Champion Rampage Jackson, legitimately beat independent wrestler Syko Stu unconscious. The attack was livestreamed by Raja on Kick. After the incident, KnokX Pro removed mentions of WWE ID from their branding, with Mike Johnson of Pro Wrestling Insider writing that it "would appear WWE has severed ties with the promotion and academy as part of the fallout of the Raja Jackson incident". On August 25, the KnokX Pro Academy was removed from the list of WWE ID-affiliated schools featured on the WWE Recruit site.

== WWE ID prospects ==
=== Men's division ===
Ring name	Real name	Notes
Aaron Rourke	Aaron Rourke	Scouted from Create A Pro Wrestling Academy and Beyond Wrestling
Chazz "Starboy" Hall	Charlie Hilder	Scouted from Game Changer Wrestling
It's Gal	Gal Barkay	Scouted from Elite Pro Wrestling Training Center and Wrestling Open
Jacari Ball	Jha'Quan Anderson	Scouted from Team Fearless Training Academy
Kato Sykes	Nick Mariano	Scouted from Chicago Style Wrestling
Marquis Journey	Unknown	Scouted from Reality of Wrestling
Max Abrams	Mike Cunningham	Scouted from Nightmare Factory; ID Champion
Richard Adonis	Richard Adonis	Scouted from World Wrestling Network
Yayne Harrison	Yanic Brouillette	Scouted from IWS Training Centre

=== Women's division ===
Ring name	Real name	Notes
Gianna Capri	Noelle Giorgi	Scouted from Flatbacks Wrestling School and SHINE Wrestling
Monica Monroe	Unknown	Scouted from Reality of Wrestling; Women's ID Champion
Sloane Jacobs	Amelia Herr	Scouted from Worldwide Wrestling Dojo and Create A Pro Wrestling Academy

== WWE NIL prospects ==
=== Men's division ===
Name	Sport(s)	Notes
Carlos Aviles	Track & Field	Scouted from The Ohio State University
Desmond Coleman	Track & Field	Scouted from Liberty University
Jacob Henry	Football and Wrestling	Scouted from University of Oklahoma
Jeremy Cody	Track & Field	Scouted from University of Miami
KeShaun Moore	Football	Scouted from Hampton University
Maliq Carr	Football and Basketball	Scouted from Michigan State University
Slane Glover	Cheerleading	Scouted from The Ohio State University
Thaddeus 'TJ' Bullard Jr.	Football	Scouted from University of Central Florida

=== Women's division ===
Name	Sport(s)	Notes
Bianca Pizano	Field Hockey	Scouted from Michigan State University
Kali Terza	Track & Field	Scouted from Kennesaw State University
Kerrigan Huynh	Track & Field	Scouted from University of Central Oklahoma
Zuriel Jimenez	Track & Field	Scouted from Columbia University

== Championships ==
=== WWE ID ===
WWE ID
Championship	Current champion	Reign	Date won	Days held	Location	Notes	Ref.
WWE ID Championship	Max Abrams	1	June 26, 2026	149	Atlanta, Georgia	Defeated Starboy Charlie at the Nightmare Factory's event, The ID Showcase.	
WWE Women's ID Championship	Monica Monroe	1	October 03, 2026	50	Texas City, Texas	Defeated Laynie Luck to win the title at Reality of Wrestling's Rise to Wrestling Royalty Event.	
