= Evolve: Succession II =

2026 WWE and Tubi special event

- Evolve Succession: II logo
- Promotion: WWE
- Brand: Evolve
- Date: January 30, 2026 (aired March 4, 2026)
- City: Orlando, Florida
- Venue: WWE Performance Center

Evolve special episodes chronology
← Previous; Evolve: Succession	Next → Evolve: Succession III

Evolve: Succession II was a 2026 professional wrestling television special produced by WWE. It marked the season premiere of WWE's weekly Evolve program on the streaming service Tubi and YouTube internationally. It aired on March 4, 2026, and exclusively featured wrestlers from the promotion's Evolve brand division. It was taped on January 30, 2026, at the WWE Performance Center in Orlando, Florida.

Three matches were contested at the event. In the main event, Jackson Drake defeated Cappuccino Jones to retain the Evolve Men's Championship.

== Production ==
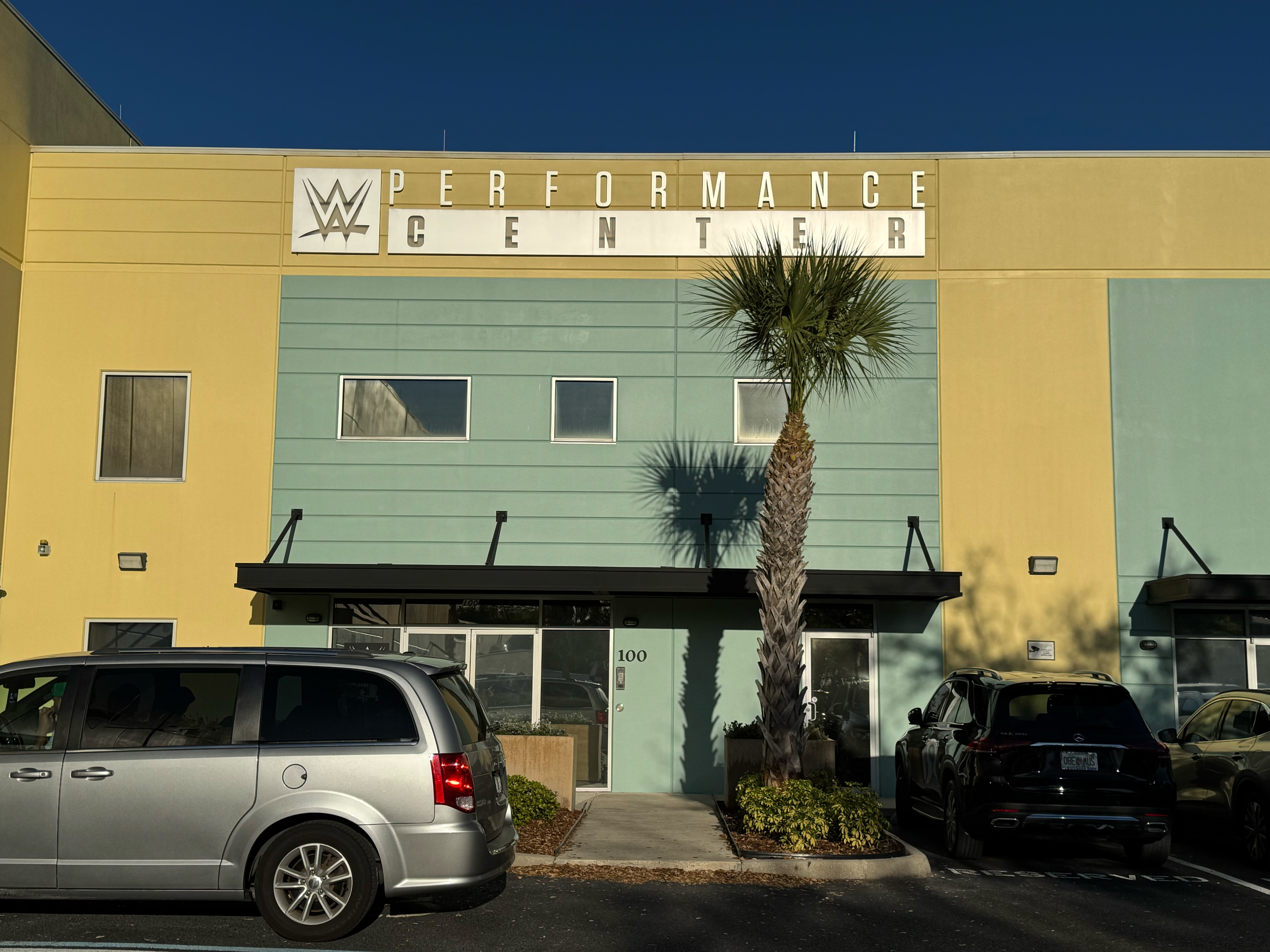
Succession II was taped at the WWE Performance Center in Orlando, Florida.

=== Background ===
During the February 4, 2026 episode of Evolve, color commentator Robert Stone announced that a special event named Evolve: Succession: II would be held on March 4, 2026, to serve as the season premiere of the second season, with both the brand's WWE Evolve Championship held by Jackson Drake, and the WWE Evolve Women's Championship held by Kendal Grey set to be contested, in the same fashion as the inaugural event in October 2025.

=== Broadcast outlets ===
In the United States, it was available to watch on ad-supported streaming television service Tubi, as Tubi exclusively owns the rights to air Evolve, while in international markets it was available to watch on YouTube.

=== Storylines ===
The event included matches that resulted from scripted storylines. Results are predetermined by WWE's writers on the Evolve brand, while storylines are produced on WWE's weekly television program Evolve.

After managing Swipe Right (Brad Baylor and Ricky Smokes) in a tag team match where they picked up a victory over Mike Cunningham and Eli Knight on the February, 11, episode of Evolve, reigning Evolve Men's Champion Jackson Drake cut a promo, in which he agreed to defend his championship in a match against reigning ID Champion Cappuccino Jones in three weeks' time at Succession. Harlem Lewis then made his entrance and confronted Drake, claiming he was next in line for a title shot, though this objection was ignored. Upon his attempt to head down to the ring to target the group, he was ambushed by Brooks Jensen.

Jensen's sneak attack led to the beginning of a rivalry between himself and Lewis, as on the February 18, episode of Evolve, Lewis addressed the camera and challenged Jensen to a match at Succession. The week after, on the February 25, episode of Evolve, Lewis acknowledged Lewis' match, where he spoke of "destroying" him at the special.

On the February 11, episode of Evolve, Kendal Grey successfully retained her Evolve Women's Championship after defending it against Karmen Petrovic. Post-match, PJ Vasa demanded a championship shot at Succession. The following week, on the February 18, episode of Evolve, during a contract signing hosted by interviewer Chuey Martinez, they signed the contract to make their match official. Vasa signed first, and once Grey followed, Vasa hit Grey's head off the table and then clocked her, leaving her laid out.

== Event ==
Other on-screen personnel
Role:	Name:
English commentators	Blake Howard
English commentators	Peter Rosenberg
Ring announcer	Kelly Kincaid
Referees	Felix Fernandez
Referees	Joey Gonzalez
Referees	Victoria D'Errico
Interviewer	Chuey Martinez

The commentators were Blake Howard and Robert Stone. The ring announcer was Kelly Kincaid, and the interviewer was Chuey Martinez.

== Results ==
No.	Results	Stipulations	Times
1	Harlem Lewis defeated Brooks Jensen by pinfall	Singles match	9:33
2	Kendal Grey (c) (with Wren Sinclair) defeated PJ Vasa by pinfall	Street Fight for the Evolve Women's Championship	8:40
3	Jackson Drake (c) defeated Cappuccino Jones by pinfall	Singles match for the Evolve Men's Championship	18:04
(c) / – the champion(s) heading into the match
