= Carlee Bright =

American professional wrestler (born 2000)

Personal information
- Born: Kennedy Cummins; June 29, 2000 (age 26) Kenosha, Wisconsin, U.S.
- Education: University of Minnesota

Professional wrestling career
- Ring name: Carlee Bright
- Billed height: 5 ft 4 in (1.63 m)
- Trained by: WWE Performance Center
- Debut: September 23, 2023

Kennedy Cummins (born June 29, 2000) is an American professional wrestler and former cheerleader. She is best known for her tenure in WWE under the ring name Carlee Bright.

== Early life ==
Cummins was born and raised in Kenosha, Wisconsin, before moving to Minneapolis, Minnesota. She attended and graduated from the University of Minnesota, where she was a member of the cheerleading team for the Minnesota Golden Gophers.

== Professional wrestling career ==
=== WWE (2022–2026) ===
On November 10, 2022, it was announced that Cummins had signed with WWE as part of the WWE Performance Center Fall 2022 Rookie Class. On September 29, 2023, she made her debut at a live event teaming with Fallon Henley losing to Lola Vice and Elektra Lopez. On the January 19, 2024 episode of NXT Level Up, she made her debut under the ring name Carlee Bright where she was defeated by Jacy Jayne. Over the following months, Bright would team with Kendal Grey on NXT Level Up mostly in losing efforts.

At NXT Stand & Deliver on April 6, NXT General Manager Ava announced the newly created NXT Women's North American Championship, and Bright participated in the preliminary combine to compete for a spot in the six-woman ladder match to crown the inaugural champion at NXT Battleground. However, Bright placed at number 13 and was therefore not selected to be in the qualifying matches since she did not go through as one of the top 12. On the May 14 episode of NXT, Bright challenged Vice wanting to prove herself after coming up short in the combine but was defeated. On the June 18 episode of NXT, Bright was defeated by Henley after a distraction by Wendy Choo who had attacked Grey at ringside. On the July 2 episode of NXT, Bright fought Choo in a losing effort. On the July 23 episode of NXT, Bright fought Wren Sinclair but was defeated after Charlie Dempsey of No Quarter Catch Crew gave Sinclair leverage from outside the ring while she was pinning Bright.

On the March 5, 2025 episode of Evolve, Bright and Grey defeated Kali Armstrong and Dani Palmer in a tag team match in Evolve's first match after its revival in WWE. Bright was released by WWE on April 24, 2026. She is due to appear in season 3 of LFG.
