= NXT Heatwave (2026) =

WWE premium live event and television special

- Promotional poster featuring Cruz Montana, Nattie, Kelani Jordan, Tony D'Angelo, and Kendal Grey
- Promotion: WWE
- Brand: NXT
- Date: August 30, 2026
- City: Edinburg, Texas
- Venue: Bert Ogden Arena

WWE event chronology
← Previous; SummerSlam	Next → Sunday Night's Main Event

NXT major events chronology
← Previous; The Great American Bash	Next → Halloween Havoc

Heatwave chronology
← Previous; Ola de Calor	Next → —

The 2026 NXT Heatwave, also promoted as NXT Heatwave: Edinburg, was a professional wrestling television special and premium live event (PLE) produced by WWE, held exclusively for wrestlers from the promotion's developmental brand, NXT. It was WWE's fifth annual NXT Heatwave and the 13th Heatwave overall. The event took place on Sunday, August 30, 2026, at Bert Ogden Arena in Edinburg, Texas.

The event was simulcast on The CW's linear channel and ESPN Unlimited in the United States, marking the first Heatwave to broadcast on both services as well as NXT's first PLE on ESPN. This was also WWE's final PLE to livestream on Abema in Japan, which merged under Netflix on October 1. NXT's Heatwave took place right after Ola de Calor, a localized version of Heatwave for the Mexican market by WWE's Mexican sister promotion Lucha Libre AAA Worldwide (AAA), which was held in the same venue. Both events went head-to-head against All Elite Wrestling's pay-per-view event, All In.

Seven matches were contested at the event. In the main event, Grayson Waller defeated Cruz Montana, Zilla Fatu, and defending champion Tony D'Angelo in a fatal four-way match to win the NXT Championship. In other prominent matches, Kelani Jordan defeated Kendal Grey to win the NXT Women's Championship and Jackson Drake defeated Myles Borne to win the NXT North American Championship. Additionally, NXT Women's North American Champion Zaria defeated WWE Women's Speed Champion Wren Sinclair and Kali Armstrong in a Winner Takes All Triple threat match to unify the championships, retiring the Women's Speed Championship in the process.

== Production ==
=== Background ===
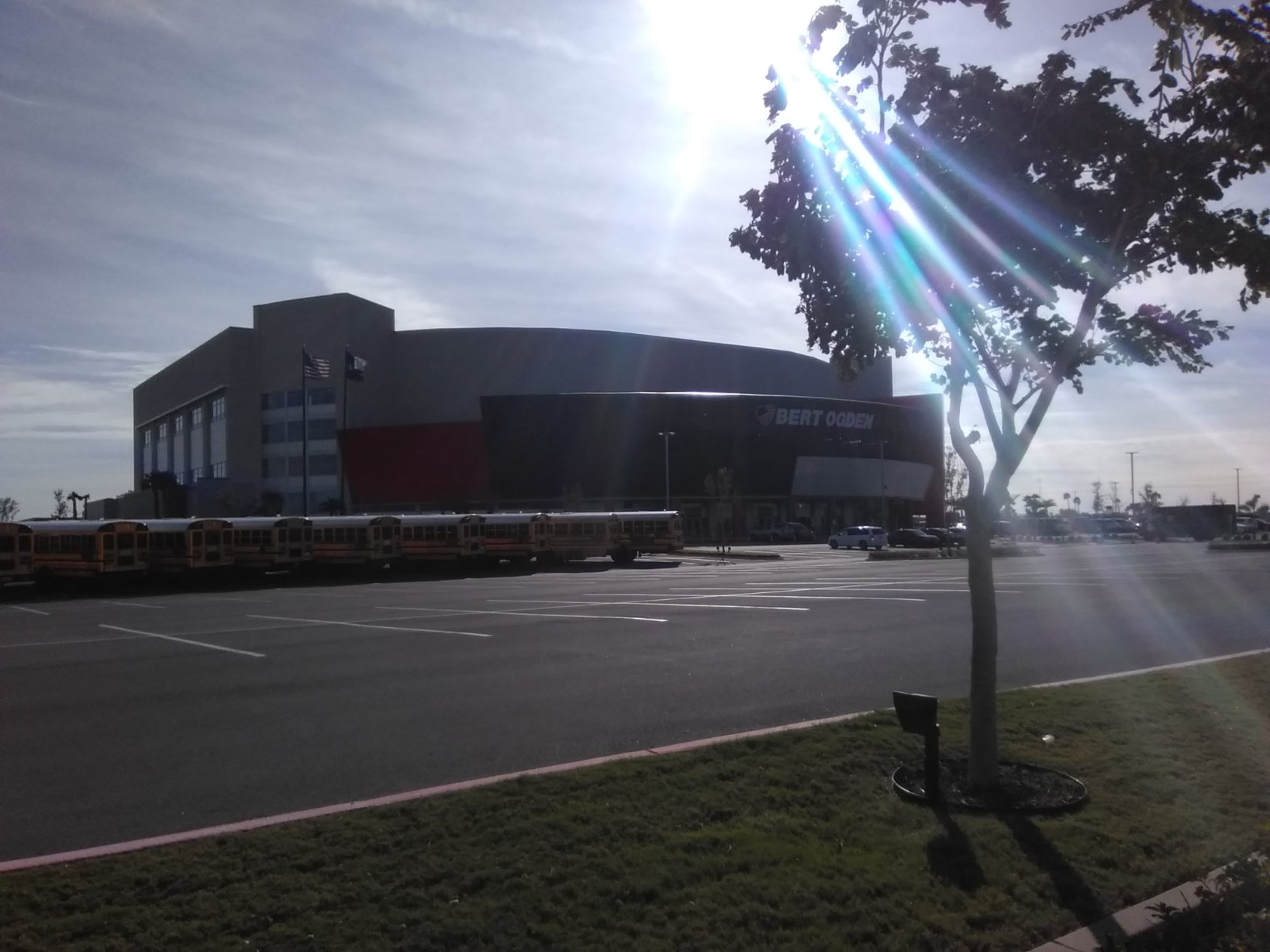
NXT's fifth annual Heatwave, and the 13th Heatwave overall, was held at Bert Ogden Arena in Edinburg, Texas.

Heatwave is a professional wrestling event established in 1994, held during the summer. After Extreme Championship Wrestling folded in 2001, WWE acquired its assets in 2003. After 19 years since that acquisition, WWE reinstated Heatwave as its own event for its developmental brand, NXT, in 2022, becoming an annual event for the brand. After the first two events were held as television specials of the NXT program, it became a premium live event (PLE) in 2024.

At The Great American Bash on June 27, 2026, WWE's fifth NXT Heatwave, and the 13th Heatwave overall, was announced for Sunday, August 30 at Bert Ogden Arena in Edinburg, Texas, with the event promoted as NXT Heatwave: Edinburg. An event by WWE's Mexican sister promotion Lucha Libre AAA Worldwide (AAA) was also announced, later named Ola de Calor (Spanish for "Heat Wave"), to be held right before NXT's Heatwave in the same venue, which was a localized version of Heatwave for the Mexican market. Both Heatwave and Ola de Calor went head-to-head against All Elite Wrestling's pay-per-view event, All In.

=== Broadcast outlets ===
In the United States, the event was broadcast as a television special on The CW's linear channel, marking the first Heatwave on The CW as NXT's PLEs began broadcasting on the channel in June after WWE's contract with Peacock for NXT's events expired in March. Additionally, ESPN announced a deal with The CW in which CW Sports, including all of NXT's programming, would be simulcast on both The CW and ESPN Unlimited beginning August 4—ESPN Unlimited had already been broadcasting WWE's main roster PLEs since September 2025. As a result, Heatwave was NXT's first PLE to air on ESPN. Outside of the U.S., it aired on SuperSport in Sub-Saharan Africa, Abema in Japan, and Netflix everywhere else.

=== Storylines ===
The event included seven matches that resulted from scripted storylines. Results were predetermined by WWE's writers on the NXT brand, while storylines were produced on WWE's weekly television program, NXT.

After Tony D'Angelo successfully retained the NXT Championship on the July 21 episode of NXT against Naraku, former Total Nonstop Action Wrestling (TNA) wrestler Mike Santana appeared as an official member of the NXT brand. The following week, Raw's Grayson Waller made a surprise appearance, and expressed his career frustrations and his intent to win the NXT Championship. Waller then called Santana, now known as Cruz Montana, a "shiny new toy" who would become irrelevant in a few weeks and said that being the top guy in TNA meant less than it did in 2005. Waller then claimed that D'Angelo only won the title because he had no competition left. Later that night, Montana expressed his intentions to become NXT Champion and responded to Waller's speech earlier that night. D'Angelo then interrupted Montana and stated that Montana could not become NXT Champion while he was champion. Waller then appeared and shoved Montana into D'Angelo. Waller ducked Montana's attack, which caused Montana to accidentally strike D'Angelo while Waller ran away. On the August 4 episode, D'Angelo said that he would not allow Waller to use the title to get what he wanted on the main roster. He also said that he had a problem with Montana even if the attack the previous week was unintentional. Waller and Montana then appeared, with Montana stating that he worked hard to get what he wanted while Waller complained when he did not get what he wanted. D'Angelo then told Montana and Waller that they could fight each other and the winner of their match would face him for the title at Heatwave, which NXT General Manager Robert Stone scheduled for the following episode. During the match, Zilla Fatu made his WWE debut, attacking both Waller and Montana, with the match ending in a no contest. On the following episode after a confrontation between Waller, D'Angelo, and Montana, Stone scheduled a triple threat match for the title at Heatwave, however, later that night during Fatu's NXT contract signing, the other three men confronted Fatu. Stone then subsequently revealed that it was also in the contract that Fatu's first WWE match would be for the NXT Championship, with Fatu being added to the title match at Heatwave, turning it into a fatal-four way match.

During the first half of 2026, Kendal Grey and Kelani Jordan pursued the NXT Women's Championship. On the April 28 episode of NXT, Jordan and Grey began a rivalry after Jordan complained that Grey was getting numerous title shots even though she was the one winning matches, referencing Grey's title match losses at NXT: New Year's Evil and Stand & Deliver. Jordan subsequently faced and defeated Grey's tag team partner Wren Sinclair later that night, injuring her knee. Afterwards, Jordan also defeated Grey on the May 12 episode after external interference, and also defeated Sinclair once again on the May 26 episode. Jordan and Grey would face each other once again on the June 9 episode, this time to determine the #1 contender for the NXT Women's Championship. Grey won the match and subsequently the title at The Great American Bash. After that, Jordan continued to complain about never having a title match, however, she would compete in a #1 contenders match on the July 14 episode in a losing effort. After Jordan continued to complain, on the August 11 episode, Grey gave Jordan a contract which contained a title match at any time and place of Jordan's choosing. Jordan then decided to have her title match at Heatwave before signing the contract.

On the July 28 episode of NXT, Zaria asked NXT General Manager Robert Stone who would be her next challenger for the NXT Women's North American Championship. Afterwards, Wren Sinclair also appeared and asked who would be her next opponent for the WWE Women's Speed Championship, with Sinclair stating that Zaria could enter a tournament to be the #1 contender for her title, which Zaria declined. Then, Sinclair also stated that she could face Zaria for her title, however, Stone scheduled a Women's Speed Championship match between Sinclair and Zaria for the next episode, where if Sinclair won, she would get a shot at Zaria's Women's North American Championship. There, the match ended in a time-limit draw, thus, Sinclair retained the title. After the match, Zaria attacked Sinclair. The following week, Zaria defended the Women's North American Championship against Sinclair. After Sinclair got distracted when Dion Lennox and Saquon Shugars's brought their brawl into the ring, Zaria capitalized with an attack to retain her title. Later that night, Sinclair proposed a unification match against Zaria for both the NXT Women's North American Championship and the WWE Women's Speed Championship, which Stone agreed and made the match official for Heatwave. On the following episode after an altercation between Zaria and Kali Armstrong, Stone scheduled a non-title match between both women for the August 25 episode, where if Armstrong won, she would be added to the unification match, turning it into a triple threat match, which she subsequently won.

On the June 16 episode of NXT, Jackson Drake and Tavion Heights fought for the right to challenge Myles Borne for the NXT North American Championship at The Great American Bash. Drake's Vanity Project stablemates Brad Baylor, Ricky Smokes, and Myka Lockwood tried to assist Drake, but they were stopped by Borne, which led to Heights defeating Drake. At The Great American Bash, Borne retained the title against Heights, his former No Quarter Catch Crew stablemate. After the match, the two wrestlers shook hands, and Borne stated that Heights made him better. On the July 7 episode of NXT, Heights tried to apologize to Borne, but he was confronted by The Vanity Project instead. Drake was frustrated at Heights for taking the title opportunity away from him and claimed that it was a fluke that only happened because of Borne. Heights then punched Drake, prompting The Vanity Project to attack Heights until Borne came out to fend them off. The following week, Drake defeated Heights with Baylor's assistance. Two weeks later, Borne successfully defended his title against Kam Hendrix as Heights prevented Mason Rook from interfering. After the match, The Vanity Project blindsided Borne and Heights, but they managed to counter The Vanity Project's attack. On the August 4 episode, Borne and Heights dethroned Baylor and Smokes to win the NXT Tag Team Championship after Drake and Lockwood were ejected by the referee. The following week, NXT General Manager Robert Stone stated that if Drake could defeat Shiloh Hill, he would challenge Borne for the NXT North American Championship and Baylor and Smokes would get their rematch for the NXT Tag Team Championship. On the August 18 episode, Drake defeated Hill after Naraku blinded Hill, allowing Drake to attack and pin Hill. Thus, Borne versus Drake for the NXT North American Championship and Borne and Heights versus Baylor and Smokes for the NXT Tag Team Championship were made official for Heatwave.

== Event ==
Other on-screen personnel
Role:	Name:
Commentators	Vic Joseph
Commentators	Booker T
Spanish commentators	Marcelo Rodríguez
Spanish commentators	Jerry Soto
Ring announcer	Mike Rome
Referees	Adrian Butler
Referees	Victoria D'Errico
Referees	Chip Danning
Referees	Dallas Irvin
Referees	Derek Sanders
Referees	Felix Fernandez
Interviewers	Sarah Schreiber
Interviewers	Blake Howard
Pre-show panel	Megan Morant
Pre-show panel	Sam Roberts

=== Preliminary matches ===
The opening match featured NXT Women's North American Championship Zaria versus WWE Women's Speed Champion Wren Sinclair versus Kali Armstrong in a Winner Takes All title unification triple threat match. Sinclair put in the Final Wrench, but Armstrong broke the submission hold. Armstrong then evaded a dive from Sinclair at ringside and powerslammed Sinclair, in which Armstrong slammed Sinclair as Armstrong fell on top of Sinclair. As Armstrong entered the ring, Zaria executed a spear on Armstrong, in which Zaria charged at Armstrong's midsection with her shoulder. Zaria then executed an F5, in which Zaria placed Armstrong on her shoulders before tossing Armstrong down to the side, and pinned Armstrong to win the match and become the unified champion.

Next, Myles Borne and Tavion Heights defended the NXT Tag Team Championship against The Vanity Project (Brad Baylor and Ricky Smokes) (accompanied by Myka Lockwood); this was Borne's first title defense of the event. After Smokes helped Baylor escape from an ankle lock by Heights, Lockwood distracted Heights, which allowed Smokes to execute an ambush on Heights. Baylor later knocked Heights off the apron by shoving Borne into Heights. The Vanity Project then executed a double-team maneuver on Borne before Smokes pinned Borne to win the title.

The third match of the event was a submission match between Jaida Parker and Nattie (accompanied by Nikkita Lyons and Karmen Petrovic), in which the only way to win was via submission. As Parker put Nattie in a sleeper hold, Petrovic distracted the referee and Lyons pulled Parker's hair to force Parker to let go of Nattie. Petrovic's Los Perros del Mal stablemates appeared on stage, which prompted Petrovic to come with them. Lyons later kicked Parker's face, which led to Thea Hail appearing to brawl with Lyons to backstage. Parker then put Nattie in the "Sharpshooter", the signature submission hold of Nattie's family. Nattie tried to force Parker to break the hold by grabbing the rope, but rope breaks were not allowed. Nattie was forced to tap out, which gave Parker the victory.

Next, Kendal Grey, with an ear injury, defended the NXT Women's Championship against Kelani Jordan. The bandage on Grey's ear was ripped out by Jordan, and Jordan would later slam Grey down ear-first. When Grey put Jordan in the juji gatame, Jordan escaped by hitting Grey's injured ear. Jordan later drove Grey's ear into the exposed steel of a turnbuckle, driving Grey's ear into the steel. Jordan proceeded to execute a "One of a Kind", in which Jordan split her legs onto the top ropes before backflipping off onto a supine Grey, to win the match and the title via pinfall.

The penultimate match was Myles Borne's second title defense of the event, defending the NXT North American Championship against Jackson Drake (accompanied by his The Vanity Project stablemates Brad Baylor, Ricky Smokes, and Myka Lockwood). Tavion Heights later appeared to join Borne's corner. As Baylor distracted the referee, Lockwood attacked Borne on the outside before tossing him Borne back in the ring. Drake then executed a 450° splash onto Borne, in which Drake did a front somersault with 1.5 rotations off the top rope onto a supine Borne, before pinning Borne to get the victory and the title. Following the match, Heights helped Borne stand up, but Borne frustratedly attacked Heights.

=== Main event ===
In the main event, Tony D'Angelo defended the NXT Championship in a fatal four-way match against Cruz Montana, Grayson Waller, and Zilla Fatu. Fatu and D'Angelo later placed Waller on their shoulders, which allowed Montana to execute a "Super Blockbuster" on Waller, in which Montana flipped over Waller before grabbing Waller's head down as Montana fell and Fatu and D'Angelo fell backwards. After Fatu executed the "Samoan Spike" on D'Angelo, in which Fatu struck D'Angelo's throat with his thumb, Fatu tried pinning D'Angelo but Waller pulled the referee out of the ring to break the count. Montana later positioned Fatu on the announce table, but D'Angelo and Montana took out each other. Waller climbed up the top rope and dove off of it to drop his elbow onto Fatu through the announce table. Montana attacked D'Angelo with the "Spin the Block", in which Montana spun around before leaping his arm forward to knock D'Angelo down. Waller then executed a rolling stunner on Montana, in which Waller rolled under Montana before leaping up and grabbing Montana's head to bring it down. Waller then pinned D'Angelo to win the match and the title.

== Reception ==
Dave Meltzer of the Wrestling Observer Newsletter gave the opening match 3.25 stars, the NXT Tag Team Championship match 2.75 stars, Jaida Parker vs. Nattie 3.25 stars, the NXT Women's Championship match 4.5 stars, the NXT North American Championship match 3 stars, and the main event 4 stars.

== Aftermath ==
On the following episode of NXT, NXT general manager Robert Stone asked Zaria, now holding the NXT Women's North American Championship and the WWE Women's Speed Championship belts, which title she would continue to defend and she chose the former title. As a result, the WWE Women's Speed Championship was retired. (Note: In reality, the WWE Women's Speed Championship was officially retired at Heatwave immediately after Zaria won the match with Wren Sinclair recognized as the final champion.) Stone then told WWE Speed Champion Lexis King to relinquish the title for it to be retired as well. According to a report, both titles were not retired sooner as WWE had hoped that another deal with X could have been made to relaunch Speed.

This was WWE's final PLE to livestream on Abema in Japan, which merged under Netflix on October 1.

== Results ==
No.	Results	Stipulations	Times
1	Zaria (North American) defeated Wren Sinclair (Speed) and Kali Armstrong by pinfall	Winner Takes All Triple threat match to unify the NXT Women's North American Championship and the WWE Women's Speed Championship	11:46
2	The Vanity Project (Brad Baylor and Ricky Smokes) defeated Myles Borne and Tavion Heights (c) by pinfall	Tag team match for the NXT Tag Team Championship	14:07
3	Jaida Parker defeated Nattie (with Nikkita Lyons and Karmen Petrovic)	Submission match	12:50
4	Kelani Jordan defeated Kendal Grey (c) by pinfall	Singles match for the NXT Women's Championship	22:57
5	Jackson Drake (with Brad Baylor, Ricky Smokes, and Myka Lockwood) defeated Myles Borne (c) by pinfall	Singles match for the NXT North American Championship	10:12
6	Grayson Waller defeated Tony D'Angelo (c), Cruz Montana, and Zilla Fatu by pinfall	Fatal four-way match for the NXT Championship	21:31
(c) / – the champion(s) heading into the match
