= Tate Wilder =

American professional wrestler and former American football player

Personal information
- Born: Case Hatch; September 6, 1997 (age 28) Gilbert, Arizona, United States

Professional wrestling career
- Trained by: WWE Performance Center
- Debut: 2025

Case Hatch (born September 6, 1997) is an American professional wrestler and former American football player signed to WWE, where he performs on the NXT brand under the ring name Tate Wilder.

== Early life ==
Hatch grew up in Gilbert, Arizona, where he attended Perry High School and played football. He comes from a large family and has several siblings.

Following high school, Hatch served a two-year mission in Miami for The Church of Jesus Christ of Latter-day Saints. After returning from his mission, he enrolled at Arizona State University, where he joined the Arizona State Sun Devils football program as a walk-on linebacker then became a fullback. He later earned a full scholarship under head coach Herm Edwards. Hatch is married.

== Professional wrestling career ==
=== WWE (2025–present) ===
Hatch signed with WWE as part of its recruitment of collegiate athletes and began training at the WWE Performance Center.

He began competing under the ring name Tate Wilder and appeared on WWE's developmental brand WWE Evolve.

On the March 19, 2025 Wilder would make his Evolve debut teaming with Drako Knox in a tag team match, where they were defeated by Tyson Dupont and Tyriek Igwe after Knox was pinned following a double-team maneuver. On the October 1, 2025, episode of Evolve, Wilder defeated Edris Enofe in singles competition. On the October 15, 2025, at Evolve Succession, Wilder defeated Brooks Jensen in a bullrope match. On October 29, 2025, Wilder competed in a three-way match against Laredo Kid and Marcus Mathers, which was won by Wilder. He continued to make appearances on Evolve throughout late 2025 and early 2026. On March 25, 2026, Wilder would defeat Kai Kavari. On April 22, 2026, Wilder teamed with Luca Crusifino in a tag team match, where they were defeated by Kam Hendrix and Harley Riggins.

On April 28, 2026, Wilder made his NXT debut saving Sean Legacy and EK Prosper following an attack from BirthRight (Lexis King, Charlie Dempsey, Uriah Connors and Channing "Stacks" Lorenzo).
