= Tyson Dupont =

Haitian professional wrestler

Personal information
- Born: Rickssen Opont; October 26, 1997 (age 28) Port-au-Prince, Haiti

Professional wrestling career
- Billed height: 5 ft 10 in (178 cm)
- Billed weight: 280 lb (127 kg)
- Billed from: Nyack, New York
- Trained by: WWE Performance Center
- Debut: August 4, 2023

Rickssen Opont (born 26 October 1997) is a Haitian professional wrestler. He is best known for his tenure in WWE on the NXT brand under the ring name Tyson Dupont. He is one-half of The High Ryze tag team with Tyriek Igwe.

== Early life ==
Opont was born in Port-au-Prince, Haiti, and later moved to the United States. He has a background in athletics, notably holding Haitian national records in shot put and hammer throw. As well as representing the University of South Alabama in Track and Field.

== Professional wrestling career ==
=== WWE (2023–2026) ===
Opont made his WWE debut on the August 4, 2023, episode of NXT Level Up as Tyson Dupont, teaming with Tyriek Igwe in a tag team match against Edris Enofe and Malik Blade, which they lost. Throughout the year, Dupont and Igwe continued to compete in the NXT tag team division. After suffering multiple losses, Wes Lee took Dupont and Igwe under his wing near the end of the year. On the December 31 episode of NXT, Lee, Dupont and Igwe teamed up for the first time, defeating Andre Chase, Hank Walker and Tank Ledger in a six-man tag team match. On the March 19, 2025, episode of Evolve, Dupont and Igwe made their Evolve debut, defeating Tate Wilder and Drako Knox in a tag team match. On the May 13 episode of NXT, the team of Lee, Dupont and Igwe became known as The High Ryze. The High Ryze reverted to a tag team after Lee was released by WWE on October 10.

On April 24, 2026, Dupont and Igwe reportedly departed WWE.

=== Total Nonstop Action Wrestling (2025) ===
Opont, as Tyson Dupont, made his Total Nonstop Action Wrestling (TNA) debut on the January 23, 2025 episode of Impact! alongside Wes Lee and Tyriek Igwe to cost Lee's former team The Rascalz (Trey Miguel and Zachary Wentz) their tag team title match against NXT Tag Team Champions Nathan Frazer and Axiom. On the February 6 episode of Impact!, Dupont made his TNA wrestling debut where he lost to Ace Austin. After the match, Dupont, Igwe and Lee attacked Austin and he was saved by The Rascalz. Two weeks later, Dupont and Igwe wrestled their first tag team match in TNA in a losing effort against The Rascalz. At Sacrifice on March 14, Lee, Igwe and Dupont lost to The Rascalz and Austin in a "Lucha Rules" six-man tag team match, suffering their first loss as a team and to end the feud.

== Championships and accomplishments ==
Haitian National Records:

- Shot Put
- Discus Throw
- Hammer Throw
