= Layla Diggs =

American professional wrestler

Personal information
- Born: Breanna Covington; October 5, 1998 (age 28) Fresno, California, U.S.

Professional wrestling career
- Billed from: Fresno, California
- Trained by: WWE Performance Center
- Debut: 2023

Breanna Covington (born October 5, 1998), is an American professional wrestler signed to WWE, where she performs under the ring name Layla Diggs on the NXT brand. Before becoming a professional wrestler, Covington was a collegiate track and field athlete.

== Early life ==
Covington was born in Fresno, California. She competed in track and field before joining WWE, representing Fresno State in collegiate athletics.

== Professional wrestling career ==
=== WWE (2023–present) ===
Covington signed with WWE and began training at the WWE Performance Center. She initially competed under her real name before adopting the ring name Layla Diggs.

Diggs made her televised debut on WWE NXT Level Up in 2024.

In 2026, Diggs became a regular competitor across WWE's developmental programming, including regular appearances on WWE Evolve and WWE LFG.

Diggs would make her NXT debut on May 26, 2026 as a heel being accompanied by Nattie in a loss to Jaida Parker.

On the June 18, 2026 episode of WWE Main Event, Diggs teamed with Kali Armstrong against Bayley and Lyra Valkyria in a losing effort.

On July 7, 2026, Diggs competed in a four-way match on NXT against Izzi Dame, Lizzy Rain and Thea Hail to determine the number one contender for the NXT Women's North American Championship. Diggs won the match after hitting a top-rope moonsault, earning a future title opportunity., Diggs would get injured in a house show match against Zaria, and delay her title match.

== Personal life ==
Covington has spoken publicly about her interest in sewing her own wrestling gear. She credited local library resources with helping her learn sewing skills and create her own ring attire.
