= Evolve: Succession (2025) =

WWE television special

- Evolve Succession logo
- Promotion: WWE
- Brand: Evolve
- Date: September 23, 2025 (Note: The main event championship match of Armstrong vs. Grey was taped on September 23, 2025.); September 30, 2025 (Note: The two other matches on the card were taped at the Performance Center on September 30, 2025.) (aired October 15, 2025)
- City: Orlando, Florida
- Venue: WWE Performance Center

Evolve special episodes chronology
← Previous —	Next → Evolve: Succession II

The 2025 Evolve: Succession was the first annual Evolve: Succession professional wrestling event produced by WWE. It was held exclusively for wrestlers from the promotion's Evolve brand division. The event aired on tape delay on October 15, 2025 as a special episode of WWE's weekly streaming television series Evolve, broadcast on Tubi in the United States and YouTube internationally. It was taped on September 23 and September 30, 2025, at the WWE Performance Center in Orlando, Florida.

Three matches were contested at the event. In the main event, Kendal Grey defeated Kali Armstrong to become the new Evolve's Women's Champion.

== Production ==
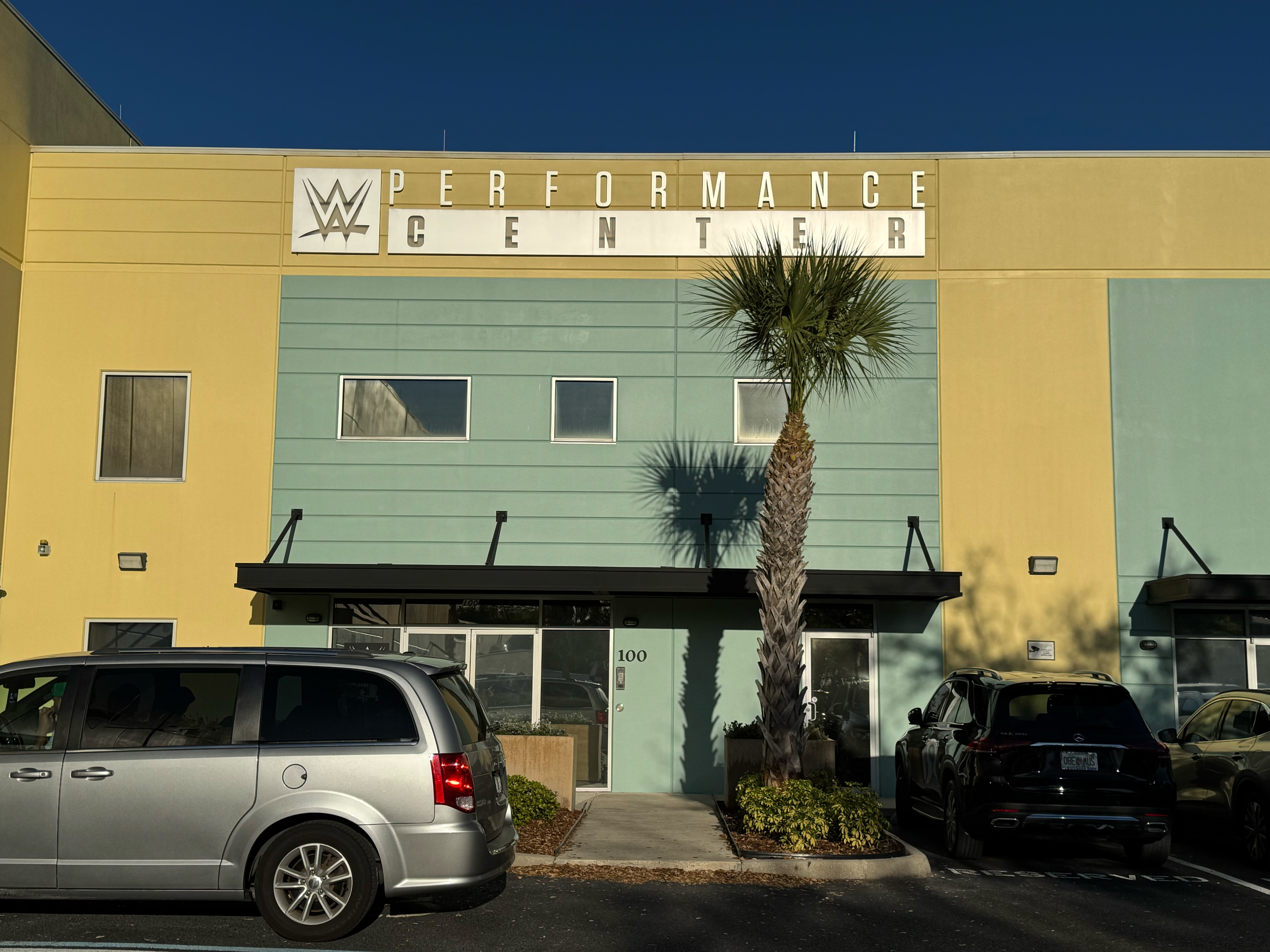
Succession was held at Evolve's home base of the WWE Performance Center in Orlando, Florida.

=== Background ===
Evolve: Succession is a professional wrestling event produced by WWE. On the September 24, 2025 episode of Evolve, Stevie Turner — the brand's Prime Minister — announced Evolve would host its first ever special event on October 15 titled "Succession", where both the WWE Evolve Championship held by Jackson Drake, and the WWE Evolve Women's Championship, held by Kali Armstrong, would be defended. It was held at Evolve's home base of the WWE Performance Center in Orlando, Florida.

=== Broadcast outlets ===
In addition to being available on ad-supported streaming television service Tubi in the United States, it was available to watch on YouTube in international markets.

=== Storylines ===
The event comprised three matches from scripted storylines. Results were predetermined by WWE's writers on the Evolve brand, while storylines were produced on WWE's weekly television program, Evolve.

On the September, 24 episode of Evolve, Kendal Grey challenged Kali Armstrong to put her Evolve Women's Championship on the line against her at the event. Chantel Monroe then made her entrance and also challenged Armstrong to defend her championship against her, though Armstrong did not accept, stating she would rather defend the championship in a singles match, instead of a triple threat match. This saw PM Stevie Turner set a number one contender's match that same night between Kendal Grey and Chantel Monroe to determine who would face Armstrong for her Women's Championship in a match at the special. The match was ultimately won by Grey, who was declared the number one contender.

On the September, 24 episode of Evolve, Jackson Drake announced a match for the following week's episode of Evolve, where Keanu Carver would face Brooks Jensen to determine the number one contender for Drake's WWE Evolve Championship at the event. On the October, 1, episode of Evolve, Carver successfully won the match to be named the number one contender, but was attacked post-match by Bryce Donovan. On the October 8, episode of Evolve, Stevie Turner announced Carver had suffered broken bones in his left hand and was left medically unable to compete, though Turner promised she would find a "suitable replacement" the same night. Later that night, during a contract signing with Jackson Drake and The Vanity Project, Bryce Donovan turned face by confronting the other members and departing the group, before attacking Brad Baylor, Ricky Smokes, and Drake. Donovan then signed the contract to officially declare himself as the challenger.

During the October 8 episode of Evolve, Brooks Jensen attacked Tate Wilder backstage. Later that night, Jensen challenged Wilder to a bullrope match to be held the following week at Succession.

== Event ==
Other on-screen personnel
Role:	Name:
English commentators	Blake Howard
English commentators	Robert Stone
Ring announcer	Mike Rome
Referees	Victoria D'Errico
Referees	Jeremy Marcus
Referees	Chip Danning
Interviewer	Chuey Martinez

The commentators were Blake Howard and Robert Stone. The ring announcer was Mike Rome, and the interviewer was Chuey Martinez.

=== Preliminary matches ===
The opener was the men's Evolve Championship match. As the opening bell sounded, Jackson Drake slapped Bryce Donovan, but Donovan fought back with a black hole slam for a near fall, leading to Drake hitting him with a high flapjack before striking stiff forearms into his chest. Outside the ring, Swipe Right interfered, which saw Donovan clock both Baylor and Smokes with punches. Drake displayed aerial offense by hitting a topé suicida on to Donovan. As Donovan was thrown back into the ring and The Vanity Project were celebrating and mocking, Keanu Carver appeared on the entrance ramp, where he unsuccessfully attempted to get through security guards restraining him from Drake, who was taunting him from inside the ring. After the commercial break, Drake had the most momentum, countering maneuvers and keeping Donovan grounded in a submission hold. While stuck in the hold, Donovan held Smokes by his throat until Drake pulled him away. The match then went outside the ring, where Donovan chokeslammed Drake on to the ring apron. After attempting another strike, Drake escaped, seeing Donovan run into the steel steps. Once both contestants were back in the ring, Drake attacked Donovan's knee and snapped his fingers. Drake ran into the back of Donovan's leg to wear it down, before hitting him with two knees to the face to pick up the victory and retain his championship.

Next, in the penultimate match of the night, Tate Wilder faced Brooks Jensen in the brand's first ever bullrope match. It began with both contestants pulling on the rope in a tug of war. Wilder caught the rope and yanked it behind Jensen's legs to trip him up. Wilder then attempted to whip Jensen with the rope, but was lured into the turnbuckle by Jensen who reversed the attempt, cornering Wilder and striking him with kicks in the corner. Wilder escaped another attack and threatened to yank the rope through Jensen's legs again, which he did, flipping him over. Jensen escaped the ring, utilized the rope being tied around his wrist and tugged on the rope in yet another tug of war. Jensen lost control of the rope, hitting the entrance ramp floor, while in ring, Wilder hit his chest into the middle rope and fell to the canvas. After the break, Jensen was using the rope to work over Wilder as he was held between the middle rope. Jensen left the ring, had Wilder's head on the apron, struck him with a right hand, and attempted to hit him in the face with the cowbell which Wilder managed to dodge by rolling out of the way. Wilder then attempted to knee Jensen in the mid-section, though Jensen moved out the way, striking Wilder in the face and hit him with a shoulder tackle to the face as he was down. He then hung Wilder by his stomach across the middle rope and struck him with a double axe handle from the top turnbuckle, and attempted a pinfall which Wilder escaped. He then forced the rope into Wilder's mouth as he was grounded and clubbed him with elbows to the head from behind. Wilder then started to whip Jensen with the rope. The match ended Wilder hit a powerbomb and dived off the top rope, landed backwards and hit Jensen with a headbutt as he was kept down for the three count to pick up the victory.

=== Main event ===
The main event was the Women's Evolve Championship match. As the match began, Kali Armstrong shoved Kendal Grey, resulting in the two shoving each other until Grey hit the canvas and rolled backwards. Grey got back to her feet, lifted Armstrong up and slammed her down, hitting her with elbows to the face. Armstrong then pushed Grey off and sent her into the corner where she hit Grey with a series of blows to the mid-section. After escaping, Grey was targeted in another turnbuckle with another series of kicks and elbows. They then began to trade holds and strikes, with Grey gaining enough momentum to dive off the top rope to the outside, landing on to Armstrong. After the break, Armstrong took control of the match until Grey retaliated by catching her and slamming her with a belly-to-belly suplex off the ropes. Grey then hit a moonsault press off the rope for a two count. Armstrong fought back, hitting Grey with a powerslam, and then hit her with a superplex from off the top rope for a near fall. Grey then ducked underneath a clothesline and attempted to roll Armstrong up with a roll-up pin which she escaped. Grey attempted to go off the middle rope, but was caught with a powerslam. After Armstrong ran the ropes for a spear, Grey caught her in a scoop slam as a counter, picking up the victory and become the new Women's Champion. Carlee Bright and Wren Sinclair headed down to the ring after the match to congratulate Grey and celebrate the victory with her, as Armstrong looked on while laying down defeated on the outside.

== Reception ==
Chris Vetter of Pro Wrestling Dot Net praised the Evolve Women's Title bout for being a "really strong main event" that showcased both women and felt the bullrope match and Evolve Men's Title opener were fine matches. He concluded that: " I enjoy these shows, but I wouldn't be surprised if Evolve went the way of Speed or the Mixed Match Challenge." David Miller of PWTorch also praised the Evolve Women's Title match for being an "outstanding main event" that highlights Grey as "the future of the WWE women's division," felt that both Wilder and Jensen looked good in the bullrope match, and commended the Evolve Men's Title bout as "a damn good match" where Donovan elevated himself. While giving a minor critique on wanting the show to go past its "regular one-hour time slot," Miller concluded that: "This was definitely a can't-miss outing for Evolve, and I look forward to future Evolve specials."

== Results ==
No.	Results	Stipulations	Times
1	Jackson Drake (c) defeated Bryce Donovan by pinfall	Singles match for the WWE Evolve Championship	7:47
2	Tate Wilder defeated Brooks Jensen by pinfall	Bullrope match	7:47
3	Kendal Grey defeated Kali Armstrong (c) by pinfall	Singles match for the WWE Evolve Women's Championship	9:02
(c) / – the champion(s) heading into the match
