= Fraxiom =

American professional wrestling tag team

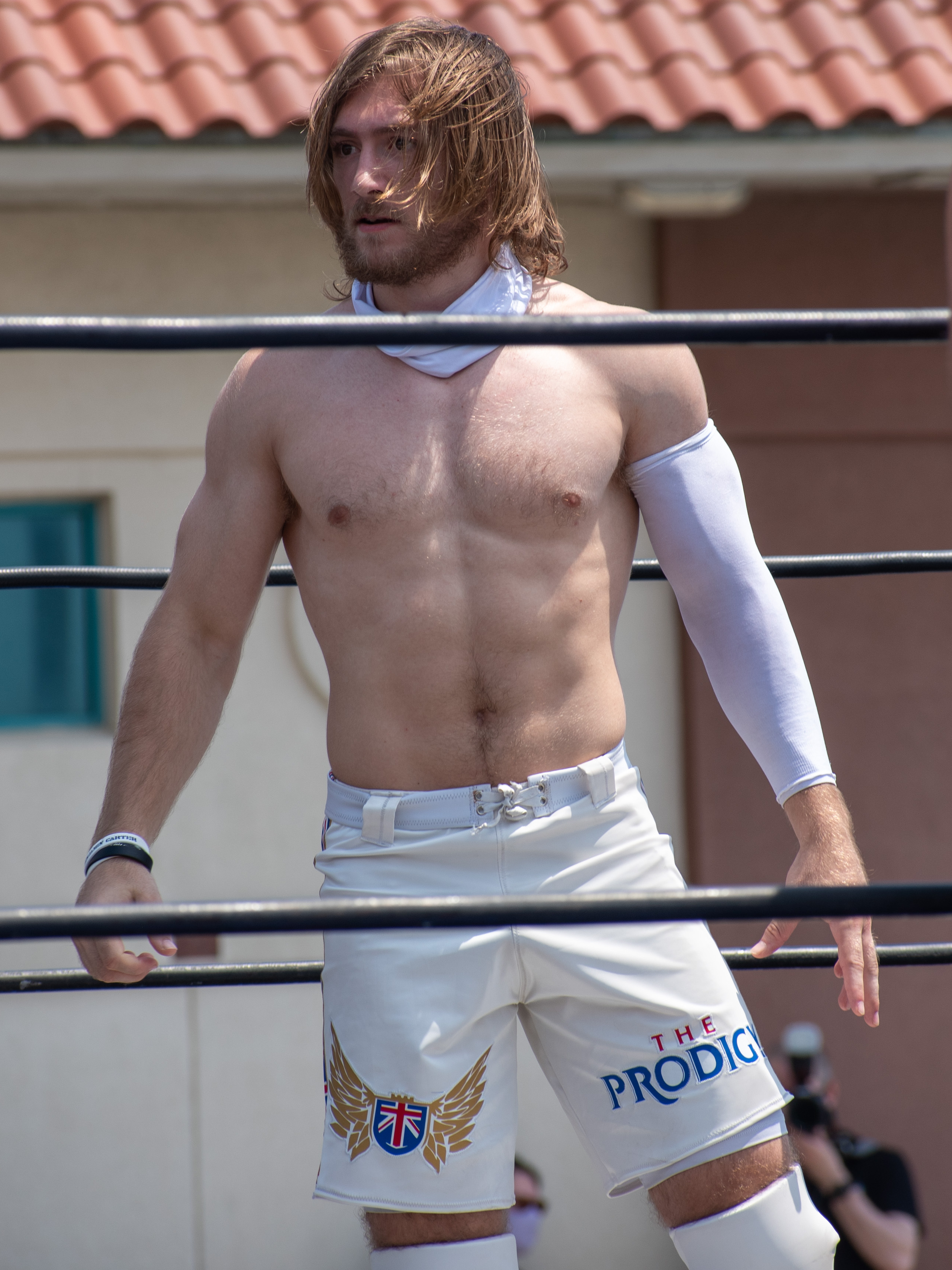
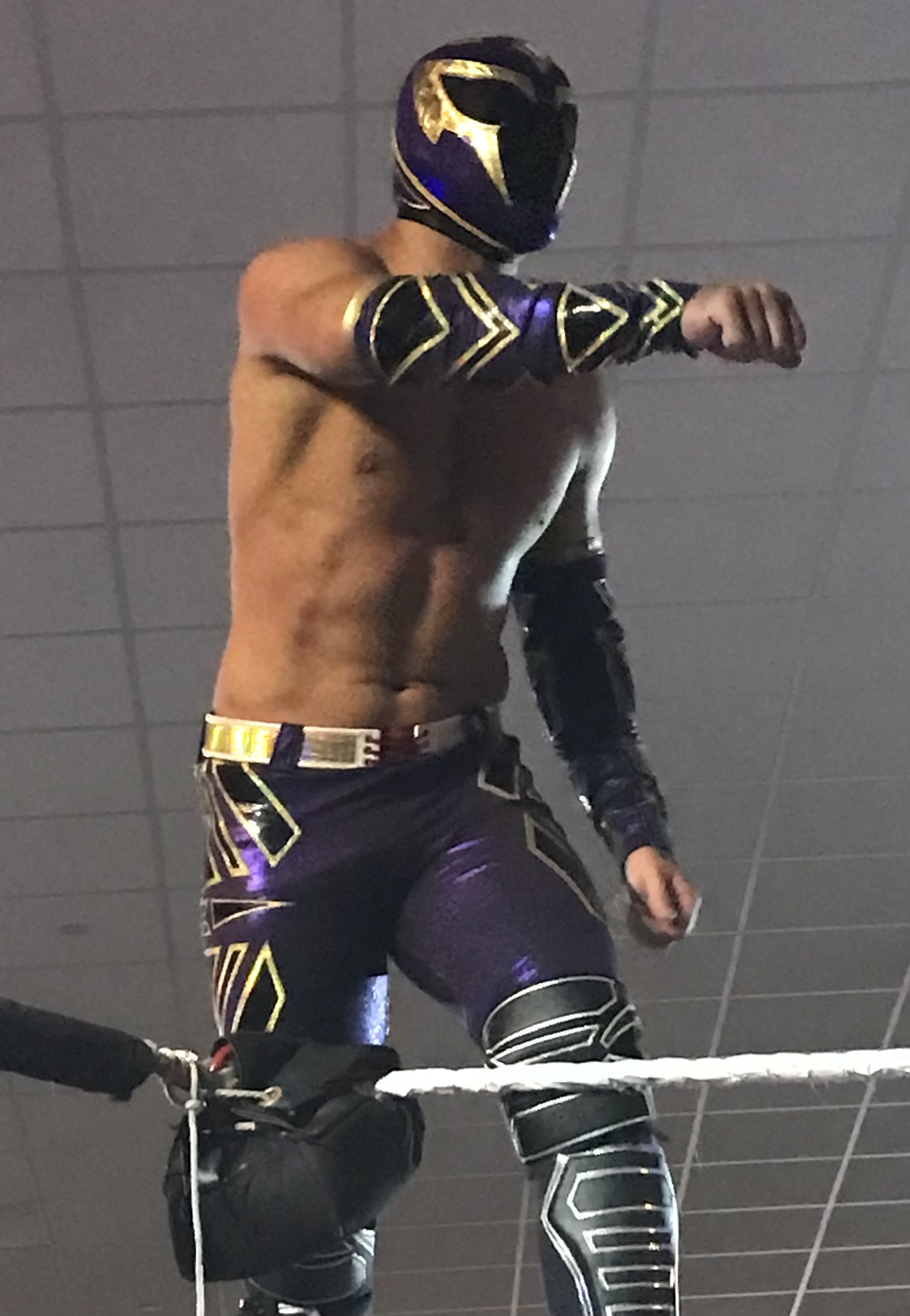
- Nathan Frazer (left, in 2020) and Axiom (right, in 2024)

Tag team
- Members: Axiom; Nathan Frazer
- Name(s): Nathan Frazer and Axiom; Fraxiom
- Debut: December 12, 2023
- Years active: 2023–present

Fraxiom are a professional wrestling tag team consisting of Nathan Frazer and Axiom. They are signed to WWE, where they perform on the SmackDown brand, and also make appearances for sister promotion Lucha Libre AAA Worldwide (AAA). They are former two-time NXT Tag Team Champions.

== History ==
=== WWE (2023–present) ===
==== NXT (2023–2025) ====
On the December 5, 2023 episode of NXT, Axiom and Nathan Frazer faced each other in a singles match, which was interrupted by the competitors in the women's Iron Survivor Challenge, causing the match to end in a no contest. A rematch between the two was later scheduled for the NXT Deadline kickoff pre-show, where Axiom defeated Frazer. In the aftermath, the two decided to team up and subsequently entered the Dusty Rhodes Tag Team Classic tournament and managed to defeat Hank and Tank (Hank Walker and Tank Ledger) in the first round on the January 9, 2024 episode of NXT, before being ultimately eliminated in the semi-finals by the eventual tournament winners The Wolf Dogs (Baron Corbin and Bron Breakker) on the January 23 episode of NXT.

In March 2024, Fraxiom participated in the NXT Tag Team Championship Eliminator Tournament, managing to qualify to the final to face NXT Tag Team Champions The Wolf Dogs for the titles at NXT Stand & Deliver but failed to win the match. In a rematch on the following episode of NXT, Fraxiom defeated The Wolf Dogs to become the new NXT Tag Team Champions. Much later, Frazer started to set his sights on singles titles to Axiom's displeasure. On the June 25 episode of NXT, Frazer failed to defeat Tony D'Angelo for the NXT Heritage Cup. On the following day's episode of Speed, he defeated Akira Tozawa to advance in the Speed Championship #1 Contender's tournament but lost to The New Day's Xavier Woods in the final. Eventually, Axiom would do the same as he faced Latino World Order's Joaquin Wilde on the July 31 episode of Speed in the Speed Championship #1 Contenders Tournament in a losing effort. After multiple successful title defenses, on the August 13 episode of NXT, Fraxiom lost the titles to Chase University (Andre Chase and Ridge Holland), ending their first reign at 126 days. Fraxiom regained the titles in a rematch 19 days later at NXT No Mercy to become two-time champions. Soon after, Frazer began to set his sights on singles championships again. At NXT Deadline on 7 December, Frazer failed to win the Iron Survivor Challenge but Fraxiom successfully defended the NXT Tag Team Championship against No Quarter Catch Crew (Myles Borne and Tavion Heights). At NXT: Roadblock on March 11, 2025, Fraxiom failed to defeat TNA World Tag Team Champions The Hardy Boyz (Matt Hardy and Jeff Hardy) for the titles. Three days later on SmackDown, Axiom made his second SmackDown appearance where he lost to World Heavyweight Champion Gunther. On the April 4 episode of SmackDown, Frazer made his main roster debut where he lost to a debuting Rey Fénix. At NXT Stand & Deliver on April 19, Fraxiom lost the NXT Tag Team Championships to Hank and Tank in their final match for NXT, ending their second reign at 230 days.

==== SmackDown (2025–present) ====
On the April 25 episode of SmackDown, Fraxiom were promoted to the SmackDown brand, where they defeated Legado Del Fantasma's Los Garza (Angel and Berto) in their first match as a team in their main roster debut. After four successive tag team match wins, including a non-title match against WWE Tag Team Champions The Street Profits (Angelo Dawkins and Montez Ford), Fraxiom faced The Street Profits for the titles on the May 23 episode of SmackDown which ended in a no-contest after interference from #DIY (Johnny Gargano and Tommaso Ciampa) and Candice LeRae, Motor City Machine Guns (Alex Shelley and Chris Sabin), and the returning Wyatt Sicks (Uncle Howdy, Erick Rowan, Dexter Lumis, Joe Gacy and Nikki Cross). On night two of SummerSlam on August 3, Fraxiom competed in a six-team tables, ladders, and chairs match for the titles, where The Wyatt Sicks retained.

=== Total Nonstop Action Wrestling (2025) ===
Frazer and Axiom made their Total Nonstop Action Wrestling (TNA) appearance at Genesis on January 19, 2025, during the tag team title match between TNA World Tag Team Champions The Hardys (Matt Hardy and Jeff Hardy) and The Rascalz (Trey Miguel and Zachary Wentz). Later that night, it was announced that The Rascalz will face Fraxiom for the NXT Tag Team Championship on the January 23 episode of Impact!, becoming the first WWE wrestlers to defend a WWE championship in TNA, where they successfully retained the titles after interference from The High Ryze (Wes Lee, Tyriek Igwe and Tyson Dupont).

== Championships and accomplishments ==
- Pro Wrestling Illustrated
  - Ranked Axiom and Frazer No. 2 of the top 100 tag team wrestlers in the PWI 100 in 2024
- WWE
  - NXT Tag Team Championship (2 times)
  - NXT Tag Team Championship Eliminator Tournament (2024)
  - NXT Year-End Award
    - Tag Team of the Year (2024)
