= No Quarter Catch Crew =

Professional wrestling stable

Stable
- Name: No Quarter Catch Crew
- Members: See below
- Debut: February 14, 2023
- Disbanded: March 10, 2026
- Years active: 2023–2026

No Quarter Catch Crew (NQCC) was a professional wrestling stable that performed in WWE on the NXT brand. The stable name is derived from the military term "no quarter" and catch wrestling. Their motto is "No pity, no mercy, no remorse, no quarter".

== History ==
=== WWE (2023–2026) ===
At the end of 2022, Drew Gulak was assigned to the NXT brand, where he played the role of Hank Walker's mentor. On February 14, 2023, episode of NXT, Gulak turned on Walker and aligned with Charlie Dempsey to form the No Quarter Catch Crew (NQCC). Weeks later, Damon Kemp and Myles Borne joined the NQCC.

On the February 27, 2024, episode of NXT, Dempsey defeated The Meta-Four's Noam Dar 2–1 under British Rounds Rules to win the NXT Heritage Cup. The following week at NXT: Roadblock, NQCC announced that the NXT Heritage Cup will be defended by the whole stable under the "Catch Clause". Under the Catch Clause, NQCC as a whole referred to themselves as the NXT Heritage Cup Champions but WWE only recognize Dempsey as the official champion. The Catch Clause was first invoked on the March 19 episode of NXT, with Gulak defeating Chase University's Riley Osborne 2–1 to successfully defend the Cup in his final NXT appearance. On the April 16 episode of NXT, Gulak was written off television after he was accused by Ronda Rousey of an alleged inappropriate behavior backstage. His contract with WWE was not renewed and he departed the company on May 3. In kayfabe, NQCC had hired Tony D'Angelo and his family to eliminate Gulak offscreen. D'Angelo demanded payment for the job but NQCC refused, causing a brawl between the two factions and resulting in a six-man tag team match between the two factions the following week at Week 1 of Spring Breakin', which was won by The D'Angelo Family (D'Angelo, Channing "Stacks" Lorenzo and Luca Crusifino). On the May 7 episode of NXT, Dempsey and Borne faced Tyson Dupont and Tyriek Igwe in a tag team match. Before the match started, the match referee was declared "unavailable" and Stacks was announced as the special guest referee, costing Dempsey and Borne the match through a fast count. After the match, an irate Dempsey gave D'Angelo a title shot at the NXT Heritage Cup as payment due to The D'Angelo Family and invoked the Catch Clause, which was nullified when D'Angelo and his Family kidnapped Kemp and Borne later that night. On the following week, D'Angelo defeated Dempsey 2–1 to win the Cup, ending Dempsey's first reign at 76 days.

On the June 25 episode of NXT, Tavion Heights defeated Kemp in an initiation match to officially join the stable. On July 8, Kemp announced his departure from WWE after his contract was not renewed. His departure was confirmed a day later on NXT where the stable (off-screen) took him out at the NXT parking lot, where Wren Sinclair witnessed the incident and began to coerce Dempsey into getting her to join the stable. At Week 2 of NXT: The Great American Bash, Sinclair defeated Kendal Grey in an initiation match to join NQCC. With Sinclair's victory, D'Angelo also gifted Dempsey a NXT Heritage Cup Championship match. On the August 13 episode of NXT, Dempsey, with the help of Sinclair, defeated D'Angelo 2–1 to win his second NXT Heritage Cup Championship. At NXT Deadline on December 7, Borne and Heights faced NXT Tag Team Champions Nathan Frazer and Axiom for the titles for the first time but lost the match whereas Sinclair entered the Women's Iron Survivor Challenge match, managing to score one pinfall but lost the match as well. On the December 24 episode of NXT, Lexis King, with Dempsey's father William Regal as his cornerman, faced Dempsey in a rematch for the NXT Heritage Cup. Regal passed his brass knuckles for King to use against Dempsey but King refused. Regal then punched King, to which the brass knuckles fell into the ring. The referee saw Dempsey pick up the brass knuckles and assumed that Dempsey used it on King and disqualified Dempsey outright, resulting in King becoming the new NXT Heritage Cup Champion and ending Dempsey's second reign at 134 days. This is also the first instance of the NXT Heritage Cup changing hands due to disqualification. However, due to a grey area in British Round Rules on whether the Cup changes hand upon disqualification of the reigning champion, NXT general manager Ava ordered King to return the Cup back to Dempsey and announced that they will compete for the Cup in a one-fall match at NXT: New Year's Evil on January 7, 2025, where King defeated Dempsey to solidify his win of the Cup.

On the May 6, 2025 episode of NXT, Dempsey, Borne and Heights participated in the 25-man battle royal to become the #1 contender for the NXT Championship. Borne won the battle royal to face Oba Femi for the title at NXT Battleground on May 25 but failed to win the match. Due to the outpouring fan support for Borne, this effectively turned him and the rest of No Quarter Catch Crew face. On the June 3 episode of NXT, Borne left the stable after he defeated Dempsey in a rounds match. The "break free" stipulation came about as Borne intended to continue furthering his singles career while Dempsey preferred he still pursue success in the tag team ranks. On the July 22 episode of NXT, Borne briefly returned to support Wren Sinclair against Blake Monroe's solo debut in Sinclair's home state of Texas. On the July 29 episode of NXT, Heights left the stable after defeating Dempsey in a "break free" stipulation match. In October, with Dempsey absent on excursion with Pro Wrestling NOAH, Sinclair teamed with Evolve Women's Champion Kendal Grey, referring to the pair as the WrenQCC.

On the March 10, 2026 episode of NXT, Dempsey reunited with Heights to face Birthright (Lexis King and Uriah Connors) in a tag team match. During the match, Dempsey attacked Heights and joined Birthright after the match, disbanding NQCC and turning heel again.

=== Total Nonstop Action Wrestling (2024) ===
On the July 11, 2024 episode of Impact!, Charlie Dempsey made his Total Nonstop Action Wrestling (TNA) in-ring debut where he defeated The Rascalz's Zachary Wentz. The following week, NQCC (Dempsey, Myles Borne and Tavion Heights; with the latter two making their TNA in-ring debuts) defeated The Rascalz (Wentz and Trey Miguel) and Kushida in a six-man tag team match. At Slammiversary on July 20, The Rascalz (Wentz, Miguel and Wes Lee), who had recently fully reunited on NXT, defeated NQCC (Dempsey, Myles Borne and Heights) in a six-man tag team match to end their feud.

== Members ==
| * | Founding member(s) |

| Member | | Joined | Left |
|---|---|---|---|
| Drew Gulak | * | February 14, 2023 | March 19, 2024 |
| Charlie Dempsey | * | February 14, 2023 | March 10, 2026 |
| Damon Kemp | | August 8, 2023 | July 8, 2024 |
| Myles Borne | | September 12, 2023 | June 3, 2025 |
| Tavion Heights | | June 25, 2024 | July 29, 2025 |
| Wren Sinclair | | August 6, 2024 | March 10, 2026 |

== Championships and accomplishments ==
- WWE
  - NXT Heritage Cup (2 times) – Dempsey
