= Wren Sinclair =

American professional wrestler (born 1995)

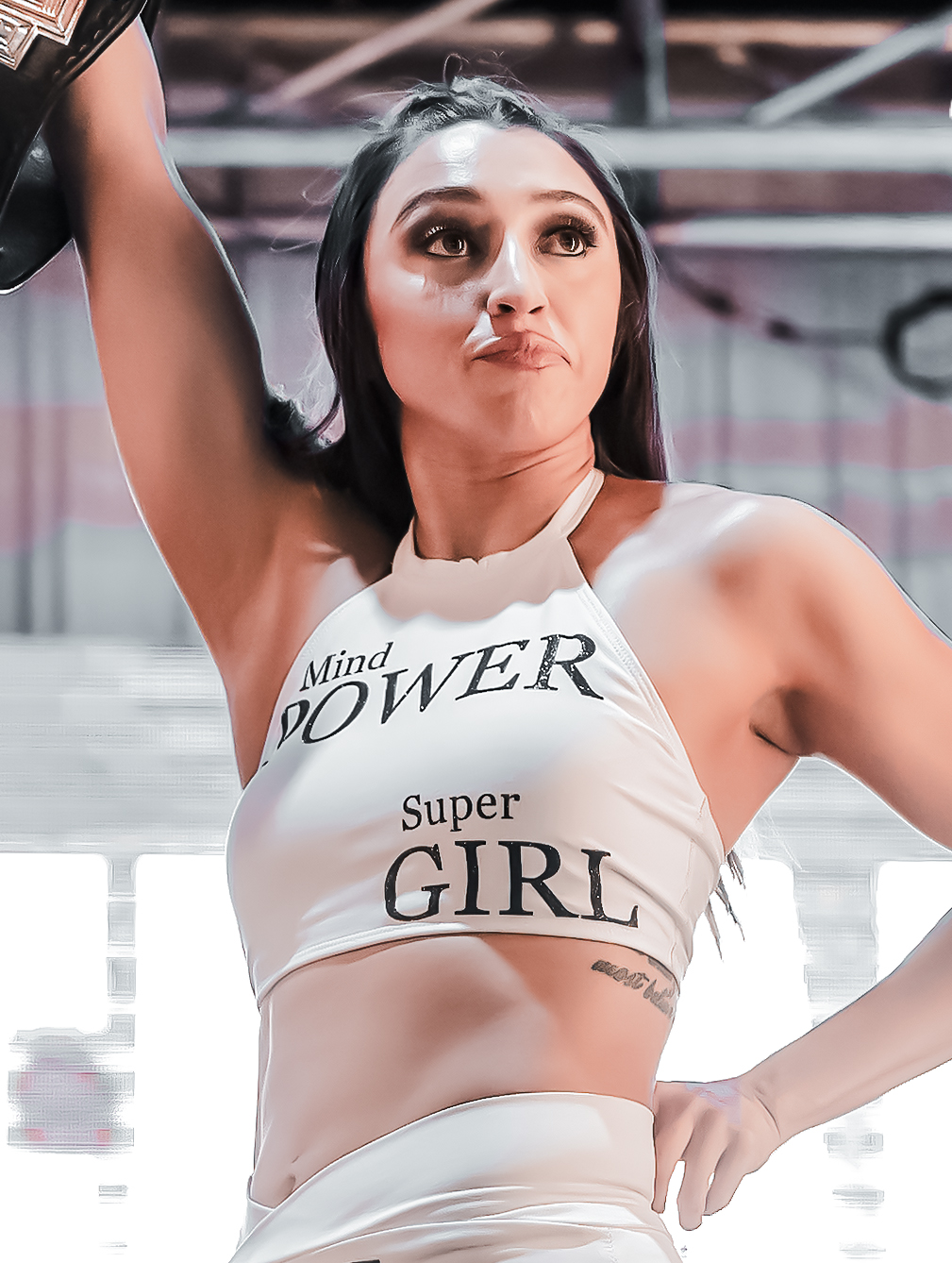
- Dombkowski in 2023

Personal information
- Born: Madison Dombkowski; May 25, 1995 (age 31) Dallas, Texas, U.S.

Professional wrestling career
- Ring name(s): Wren Sinclair; Madi Wrenkowski; Lady Shani
- Billed height: 5 ft 6 in (1.68 m)
- Billed weight: 124 lb (56 kg)
- Billed from: Dallas, Texas
- Trained by: Hybrid School Of Wrestling; WWE Performance Center; Jazz
- Debut: October 18, 2019

Madison Dombkowski (born May 25, 1995) is an American professional wrestler. As of December 2023, she is signed to WWE, where she performs under the ring name Wren Sinclair on the NXT brand and is one-half of WrenQCC alongside Kendal Grey. She is a former one-time and the final WWE Women's Speed Champion.

Dombkowski was previously known under the ring name Madi Wrenkowski, having performed for the National Wrestling Alliance (NWA) where she became a one-time NWA World Women's Tag Team Champion, and made appearances for All Elite Wrestling (AEW).

== Professional wrestling career ==
=== Independent circuit (2019–2023) ===
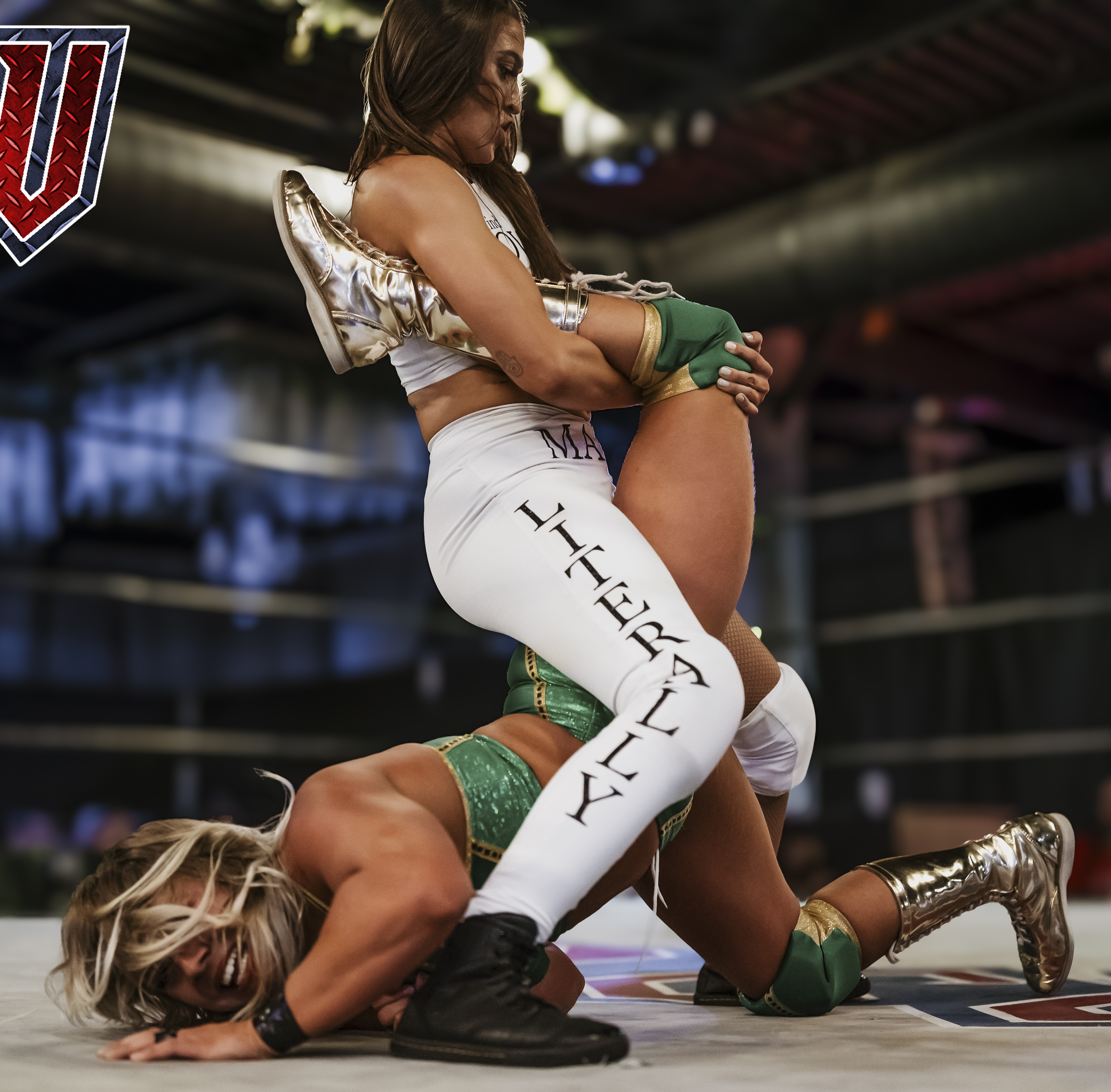
Wrenkowski placing Miranda Gordy in an elevated single leg Boston crab during a match in November 2023

Dombkowski made her professional wrestling debut on October 18, 2019 for Mission Pro Wrestling under the ring name Madi Wrenkowski losing to Jazz. From 2020 to 2022, Wrenkowski made appearances for All Elite Wrestling (AEW) mainly on Dark and Dark: Elevation where she was used as enhancement talent. She also worked for the National Wrestling Alliance (NWA) from 2021 to 2023 where she held one half of the NWA World Women's Tag Team Championship as part of M95 with Missa Kate.

=== WWE ===
==== NXT debut (2024) ====
On December 21, 2023, it was reported that Dombkowski had signed with WWE. She was assigned to NXT and made her debut on the January 16, 2024, episode of NXT as a face under the ring name Wren Sinclair, where she replaced an injured Cora Jade in an NXT Women's Championship #1 Contender's battle royal, eliminating Lash Legend but was eliminated by Kiana James. The following week, Sinclair had her first televised singles match losing to Lash Legend and was attacked after by Legend and Jakara Jackson until Fallon Henley ran out and saved Sinclair. On the February 6 episode of NXT, Sinclair teamed with Henley in a losing effort to Legend and Jackson. After Sinclair got into a heated confrontation with Roxanne Perez backstage on the February 13 episode of NXT, she fought Perez the following week but was defeated. At NXT Stand & Deliver on April 6, NXT general manager Ava announced the newly created NXT Women's North American Championship, and Sinclair went through as one of the top 12 participants from the preliminary combine to compete for a spot in the six-woman ladder match to crown the inaugural champion at NXT Battleground. On the May 28 episode of NXT, Sinclair fought eventual inaugural champion Kelani Jordan for a spot in the ladder match but was defeated.

==== No Quarter Catch Crew (2024–2026) ====
After witnessing the No Quarter Catch Crew (NQCC; Charlie Dempsey, Myles Borne and Tavion Heights) taking out former member Damon Kemp in the NXT parking lot, Sinclair began to coerce Dempsey into joining the stable. At Week 2 of NXT: The Great American Bash, she defeated Kendal Grey in an initiation match to join NQCC, turning heel for the first time in her WWE career. Sinclair helped Charlie Dempsey to win the NXT Heritage Cup for the second time by using underhanded tactics on the August 13 episode of NXT, thus cementing her heel turn. On the August 20 episode of NXT, Sinclair took part in a six-woman gauntlet match to determine the number one contender for Roxanne Perez's NXT Women's Championship at No Mercy, but was eliminated by Sol Ruca. On the 24 September episode of NXT (which marked its last episode on the USA Network), Sinclair competed in her first championship match in WWE when she took on Kelani Jordan for the NXT Women's North American Championship, after having confronted and slapped her backstage the week prior following Dempsey's advice to "go make a name for yourself". However, Sinclair failed to win the title. On the 15 October episode of NXT, Sinclair faced Stephanie Vaquer in the latter's in-ring debut, where she would lose. At NXT Deadline on December 7, Sinclair competed in the Iron Survivor Challenge to determine the number one contender for the NXT Women's Championship, after having qualified in a last chance fatal four-way match. She would go on to lose the match.

Following NXT Battleground in May 2025, Sinclair and the rest of NQCC effectively turned face due to the outpouring support for Borne during his NXT Championship match against Oba Femi despite failing to win the title. On the March 10, 2026 episode of NXT, NQCC was disbanded after Dempsey turned heel by attacking Heights during their tag team match against The Birthright (Lexis King and Uriah Connors) and joining the latter stable.

==== WrenQCC (2025–present) ====
Around October 2025, Sinclair began teaming up with then-Evolve Women's Champion Kendal Grey as WrenQCC (a pun on NQCC). On the March 17, 2026 episode of NXT, Sinclair defeated Fatal Influence's Fallon Henley to win the WWE Women's Speed Championship, her first championship in WWE. At NXT Heatwave on August 30, Zaria won a Winner Takes All triple threat match also involving Kali Armstrong to unify Sinclair’s WWE Women's Speed Championship and Zaria's NXT Women's North American Championship, ending Sinclair's reign at 165 days and was recognized as the final WWE Women's Speed Champion.

== Championships and accomplishments ==
- Dogg Pound Championship Wrestling
  - DPCW Women's Championship (1 time)
- National Wrestling Alliance
  - NWA World Women's Tag Team Championship (1 time) – with Missa Kate
  - NWA Champions Series Winner (2023) – with Chris Adonis, Dak Draper, Mims, Alex Taylor, Taya Valkyrie & La Rosa Negra
- Mission Pro Wrestling
  - MPW Tag Team Championship (1 time) – with Rache Chanel
- Pro Wrestling Illustrated
  - Ranked No. 191 of the top 250 female wrestlers in the PWI Women's 250 in 2025
- Puro Pinche Wrestling
  - PPW Women's Championship (1 time)
- River City Wrestling
  - RCW Women's Championship (2 times)
- Texas Wrestling Cartel
  - TWC Women’s Championship (1 time)
- WWE
  - WWE Women's Speed Championship (1 time, final)
  - WWE Women's Speed Championship #1 Contender Tournament (February 24 – March 17, 2026)
