= Nikkita Lyons =

American professional wrestler (born 1999)

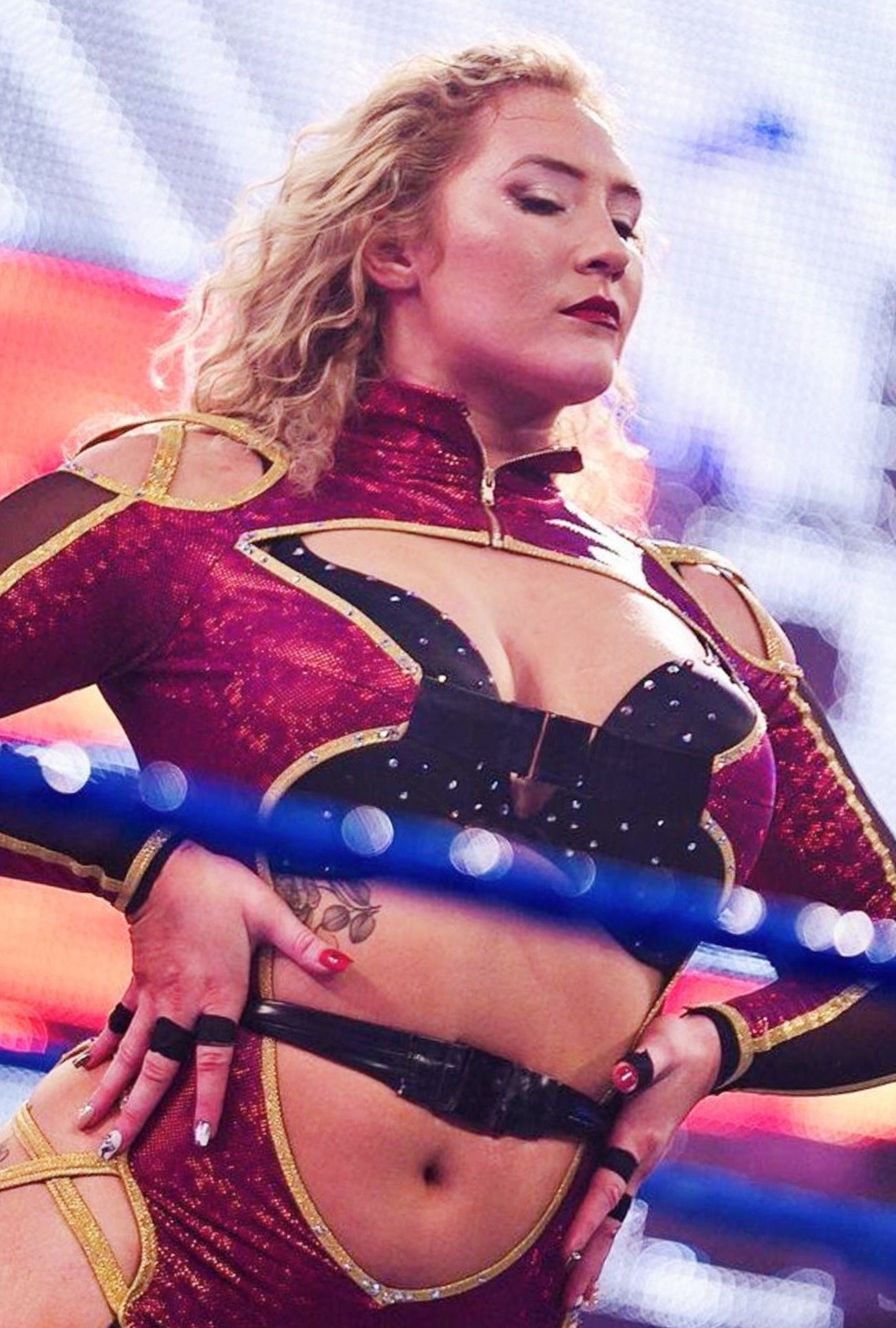
- Lyons in 2022

Personal information
- Born: Faith Marie Jefferies; August 5, 1999 (age 27) Las Vegas, Nevada, U.S.

Professional wrestling career
- Ring name(s): Big Kat Kita; Faith; Faith Jefferies; FaithyJ; Faith the Lioness; Nikkita Lyons
- Billed height: 5 ft 8 in (1.73 m)
- Billed weight: 150 lb (70kg)
- Billed from: Las Vegas, Nevada; Los Angeles, California
- Trained by: Selina Majors
- Debut: October 11, 2018
- Musical career
- Genres: R&B; pop
- Instruments: Vocals
- Years active: 2017–present
- Label: Grand Jury
- Website: faithyj.com

Faith Marie Jefferies (born August 5, 1999) is an American professional wrestler. As a wrestler, she has been signed to WWE since August 2021, where she performs on the NXT and Evolve brands under the ring name Nikkita Lyons. In Evolve, she is the reigning WWE Evolve Women's Champion in her first reign.

Jefferies has also worked for Women of Wrestling (WOW) as Faith the Lioness. She began practicing Taekwondo at age four and earned a black belt by age eight.

== Early life ==
Jefferies was born in Las Vegas, Nevada and raised in Hollywood, California. She began practicing Taekwondo at the age of four, earning a black belt by the age of 8. She graduated from high school in early 2017.

== Professional wrestling career ==
=== Women of Wrestling (2019–2021) ===
Shortly after graduating high school in 2017, Jefferies began professional wrestling training under Selina Majors. She debuted for Women of Wrestling under the ring name Faith The Lioness.

=== WWE (2021–present) ===
In summer 2021, Jefferies attended WWE's tryout in Las Vegas, where she was offered a developmental contract. Her WWE debut was on the December 31, 2021 episode of 205 Live, under the ring name Nikkita Lyons, losing to Amari Miller. She made her NXT brand debut on the February 22, 2022 episode of NXT, defeating Kayla Inlay. In April, Lyons entered into a feud with Lash Legend, beating her on the April 5 and 26 episodes of NXT respectively. At Spring Breakin', she teamed with Cora Jade to defeat Legend and Natalya in a tag team match. On the May 10 episode of NXT, Lyons participated in the NXT Women's Breakout Tournament, defeating Arianna Grace in the first round. On May 24, it was announced that Lyons was removed from the tournament due to an injury, revealing on her Instagram account a day later that she suffered a partial MCL tear and an MCL sprain.

Lyons returned on the June 28 episode of NXT, defeating NXT Women's Champion Mandy Rose by disqualification. On the July 19 episode of NXT, Lyons competed in a 20-woman battle royal to determine the number one contender for the NXT Women's Championship, eliminating Kayden Carter and Kiana James, but was eliminated by Tiffany Stratton. On the August 8 episode of Raw, it was announced that Lyons would be teaming with Zoey Stark in a tournament to fill the WWE Women's Tag Team Championship that had been vacant since May. On the August 19 episode of SmackDown, Lyons and her tag partner were removed from the tournament due to Stark reportedly sustaining a concussion days earlier in an NXT Women's Championship match. On September 13 at the NXT 2.0 One Year Anniversary Show, Lyons and Stark defeated James and Grace. On the November 8 episode of NXT, Lyons and Stark failed to capture the NXT Women's Tag Team Championship from Carter and Katana Chance, and Lyons was taken out by Stark after the match. Lyons lost to Stark on the December 20 episode of NXT and was injured by Blair Davenport on the January 24, 2023 episode of NXT. Lyons returned to NXT on the December 5 episode, attacking Davenport. On the December 12 episode, she made her return to the ring after a near year-long absence in a tag team match with Lyra Valkyria, facing Blair Davenport & Cora Jade, where she and Valkyria failed to win.

In March 2024, Lyons was revealed to have suffered another injury. She returned to in-ring action at a NXT house show in Davenport, Florida, on September 27 and returned to NXT on the October 15 episode, defeating Lola Vice after interference from Jaida Parker, showing signs of a heel turn. On the October 29 episode of NXT, Lyons turned heel, as she was revealed as Adrianna Rizzo's attacker following Lyons' defeat against Kelani Jordan. Around a month later, Lyons got involved in a love triangle storyline between Ashante "Thee" Adonis and Karmen Petrovic. On the May 7, 2025 episode of Evolve, Lyons made her Evolve brand debut where she defeated Kendal Grey.

On the January 27, 2026 episode of NXT, she made her return as a spiritual guru. She aligned herself with Blake Monroe and offered to take on Jaida Parker on Monroe's behalf, which led to her being defeated. In April of the same year, Lyons participated in season 3 of LFG (Legends & Future Greats), she would return to NXT on the April 28 edition losing to the debuting Lizzy Rain, the following week she would return to NXT regularly by confronting Tatum Paxley. On June 24 at Evolve: Succession III (taped May 29), Lyons defeated Wendy Choo to win the WWE Evolve Women's Championship, her first championship in WWE.

== Other media ==
Jefferies, as Nikkita Lyons, made her video game debut as a playable character in WWE 2K23. She is also a playable character in WWE 2K25 and WWE 2K26.

On August 8, 2024, Jefferies, under her music stage name FaithyJ, released a music video for her song To Be A Champion. In the following month, Jefferies, as Nikkita Lyons, appeared in fellow NXT wrestler Trick Williams' music video for the song The Realest.

=== Video games ===
Year	Title	Notes	Ref.
2023	WWE 2K23	Video game debut	
2024	WWE 2K24		
2025	WWE 2K25		
2026	WWE 2K26		

=== Filmography ===
Year	Title	Role	Notes
2005	The Dying Gaul	Debbon	Acting debut
2007	The Killing Grounds/Children of Wax	Kid	
2018	INCONTRAMI	Girl 8	Music video
2020	One Mo' Chance	She-Rah/She-Raw	11 episodes
2020	Quartship	Self	Episode: "Minikon Scores a Perfect 10 from Faith"; credited as FaithyJ
2020	Baby U	Self	Music video
2021	One Mo' Chance: The Reunion	She-Raw	4 episodes
2022	Father Stu	Timekeeper	Uncredited
2024	To Be A Champion	Self	Music video
2024	The Realest	Self	Music video
2026	Phat Check	Self	Music video
2026	Agent of Shadows	Svetlana	Microdrama series

== Discography ==
=== Studio albums ===
List of studio albums
Title	Album details
Rough Cuts	Released: 2024; Label: Grand Jury Entertainment; Formats: Digital download

=== Singles ===
List of singles as lead artist
Title	Year	Album
"No Time" (featuring La Jones)	2017	Non-album singles
"Baby U"	2020	Non-album singles
"To Be a Champion"	2024	Non-album singles
"Sky on Fire (Remastered 2025)"	2024	Non-album singles
"Bullshyt" (featuring La Jones)	2024	Non-album singles
"Brand New Me (Remastered 2025)"	2024	Non-album singles
"Phat Check"(with Mara Sadè)	2026	Non-album singles

== Championships and accomplishments ==
- WWE
  - WWE Evolve Women's Championship (1 time, current)
