= Cappuccino Jones =

American professional wrestler (born 2002)

Personal information
- Born: August 16, 2002 (age 23) Tulsa, Oklahoma, U.S.

Professional wrestling career
- Ring name(s): Cappuccino Jones; Cap Jones
- Billed height: 5 ft 11 in (180 cm)
- Billed weight: 161 lb (73 kg)
- Billed from: Tulsa, Oklahoma
- Debut: August 20, 2022

Cappuccino Jones (born August 16, 2002) is an American professional wrestler. He performs on the independent circuit – notably for Reality of Wrestling (ROW), where he is the current ROW Texas Champion in his first reign. He is best known for his tenure with WWE, where he performed for the WWE ID program and Evolve brand.

== Professional wrestling career ==
=== All Elite Wrestling (2024) ===
Jones made his debut for All Elite Wrestling (AEW) on the February 23, 2024, episode of Rampage under the ring name Cappuccino Jones, where he teamed with Jonny Lyons, in which they lost to The Young Bucks (Matthew Jackson and Nicholas Jackson).

=== WWE (2024–2026) ===
On November 7, 2024, WWE announced that Jones was one of the first independent wrestlers selected for their WWE ID program. On the March 5, 2025, episode of Evolve, Jones, Sean Legacy, and Jack Cartwheel defeated Jackson Drake and Swipe Right (Brad Baylor and Ricky Smokes) in a six-man tag team match in Evolve's first main event after its revival in WWE. Jones continued to team with Cartwheel and solidified their tag team partnership as Adrenaline Drip.

In July 2025, Jones was announced as one of the six finalists in the tournament to crown the inaugural men's WWE ID Champion. Jones qualified to the tournament final at Game Changer Wrestling (GCW) ID Showcase on August 1, where he defeated Cartwheel to become the inaugural ID Champion, becoming a double champion in the process. On March 23, 2026, at Beyond Wrestling's event, Wrestling Open RI 44: "One of These Nights", he lost the ID Championship to Starboy Charlie, ending his reign at 234 days. On October 13, 2026 Jones announced he was walking out of the WWE ID program on X.

== Championships and accomplishments ==
- Body Progression Wrestling
  - BPW Lionheart Championship (1 time)
- Core Professional Wrestling
  - CPW 918 Championship (1 time)
- United Wrestling Entertainment
  - UWE Championship (1 time)
  - UWE Tag Team Championship (1 time) – with Romeo Reese
- Pro Wrestling Illustrated
  - Ranked No. 362 of the top singles wrestlers in the PWI 500 in 2026
- Reality of Wrestling
  - ROW Texas Championship (1 time, current)
- Wrestle Against Hunger
  - WAH Hunger Dojo Championship (1 time)
- Texas Wrestling Cartel
  - TWC Heart of a Hustler Championship (1 time)
- WWE
  - WWE ID Championship (1 time, inaugural)
  - WWE ID Championship Tournament (2025)
- The CODA Brand
  - CTC Championship (1 time)
