= Kali Armstrong =

American professional wrestler (born 1994)

Personal information
- Born: Destinee Brown; July 6, 1994 (age 32) Inglewood, California, U.S.

Professional wrestling career
- Ring names: Destinee Brown; Kali Armstrong
- Billed height: 5 ft 7 in (170 cm)
- Billed from: Inglewood, California
- Trained by: WWE Performance Center
- Debut: June 8, 2024

Destinee Brown (born July 6, 1994) is an American professional wrestler. As of October 2023, she is signed to WWE, where she performs on the NXT brand under the ring name Kali Armstrong and is a former one-time and inaugural Evolve Women's Champion.

== Early life ==
Brown was born in Inglewood, California on July 6, 1994. She attended Westchester High School, Cal State Fullerton and the University of Southern California. At USC, she was a member of the track and field team.

== Professional wrestling career ==
=== WWE (2023–present) ===
Brown signed with WWE in October 2023. She made her on-screen debut on the September 20, 2024, episode of NXT Level Up under the ring name Kali Armstrong, losing to Brinley Reece. On the March 5, 2025, episode of Evolve, Armstrong and Dani Palmer lost to Kendal Grey and Carlee Bright in a tag team match in Evolve's first match after its revival in WWE. On the May 28 episode of Evolve, Armstrong won a fatal four-way elimination match to become the inaugural Evolve Women's Champion, defeating Grey, Kylie Rae, and Wendy Choo. On the July 9 episode of Evolve, Armstrong defeated Natalya in her first title defense. Armstrong made her NXT brand debut on the July 15 episode of NXT, where she retained the Evolve Women's Championship against Karmen Petrovic by disqualification after interference from Jordynne Grace. At Evolve: Succession on October 15 (taped September 23), Armstrong lost the Evolve Women's Championship to Grey, ending her reign at 151 days (140 days as recognized by WWE). On the April 15, 2026 episode of Evolve (taped on March 20), Armstrong participated in the Gauntlet Eliminator match for the vacant Evolve Women's Championship as the third entrant but failed to win the title. She wrestled her final match in Evolve on the April 29 (taped on April 10) episode of Evolve where she defeated Tyra Mae Steele.

On April 14, 2026 at Week 1 of NXT: Revenge, Armstrong was promoted to the NXT brand.

== Championships and accomplishments ==
- WWE
  - WWE Evolve Women's Championship (1 time, inaugural)
