= Kendal Grey =

American professional wrestler (born 2001)

Personal information
- Born: Peyton Prussin; June 15, 2001 (age 25) Las Vegas, Nevada, U.S.
- Education: Life University

Professional wrestling career
- Ring name: Kendal Grey
- Billed height: 5 ft 4 in (1.63 m)
- Billed from: Las Vegas, Nevada
- Trained by: Sara Amato; WWE Performance Center; Shawn Spears
- Debut: March 22, 2024

Peyton Prussin (born June 15, 2001) is an American professional wrestler. As of January 2023, she is signed to WWE, where she performs on the NXT brand under the ring name Kendal Grey and is one-half of WrenQCC alongside Wren Sinclair. She is a former one-time NXT Women's Champion and one-time WWE Evolve Women's Champion.

== Early life ==
Prussin was born in Las Vegas, Nevada and attended Arbor View High School before graduating from Life University with a Bachelor of Science in Biology degree. Peyton is the first known athlete from her college to reach the top professional level in a major American sport.

At a young age, she played many sports such as soccer, gymnastics, and jiu-jitsu before ultimately settling on amateur wrestling which she pursued in high school and college.

Prussin became the first girl to qualify for the boys' 4A state championships in Nevada during her sophomore year, as well as a 10-time High School All-American, a 2018 Fargo runner-up, a 2018 Folkstyle runner-up, and a 2018 Cadet World Team Trial runner-up. She also placed third at the 2018 Yoshida Saori Cup in Japan, became a 2019 Folkstyle National Champion, was a 2018 USA High School Wrestler of the Year finalist, and was a 2018 USA National Team member.

She was a finalist for the 2023 Anthony-Maroulis Trophy.

== Professional wrestling career ==
=== WWE (2023–present) ===
On January 26, 2023, it was announced that Prussin had signed with WWE as part of the NIL (Next In Line) program. In 2024, she made her debut under the ring name Kendal Grey, working on programs like NXT Level Up or NXT or Evolve, Grey and Carlee Bright defeated Kali Armstrong and Dani Palmer in a tag team match in Evolve's first match after its revival in WWE., Grey made her televised debut accompanying Bright in her match against Fallon Henley. She later appeared at NXT: The Great American Bash. Grey was defeated by Jaida Parker. On October 15 at Evolve: Succession (taped September 23), Grey defeated Kali Armstrong to win the Evolve Women's Championship. In October 2025, Grey started teaming with Wren Sinclair as WrenQCC. At NXT Deadline, she won the Women's Iron Survivor Challenge to earn an NXT Women's Championship match against Jacy Jayne at NXT: New Year's Evil on January 6, 2026 but failed to win the title.

On the March 11 episode of Evolve, after a successful title defense against Tyra Mae Steele, Grey vacated the Evolve Women's Championship as she permanently moved to the NXT brand, ending her reign at a record-setting 146 days. At NXT Stand & Deliver on April 4, Grey failed to win the NXT Women's Championship against Jayne and Lola Vice in a triple threat match, which was won by Vice to become the new champion. Grey's performance earned heavy praise from journalist Dave Meltzer, who said that Grey had the potential to be "the best woman wrestler this country [United States] has ever produced". At NXT The Great American Bash on June 28, Grey defeated Vice to become the new NXT Women's Champion. On her preparation for the title defense against Lola Vice in an Underground Match, she was seen training with her freestyle wrestling coach, Ely Prussin and Julius Creed. Grey retained the title on August 5 episode of NXT by submission to snap Vice's streak of four consecutive wins despite suffering lacerations on the right ear as it hit the steel steps. At NXT Heatwave on August 30, Grey lost the title to Kelani Jordan, ending her reign at 62 days. On the September 15 edition of NXT, it was confirmed Grey would be out indefinitely.

== Championships and other accomplishments ==
=== Amateur wrestling ===
- College
  - NAIA National champion (2021, 2022, 2023)

=== Professional wrestling ===
- Pro Wrestling Illustrated
  - Rookie of the Year (2025)
- WWE
  - NXT Women's Championship (1 time)
  - WWE Evolve Women's Championship (1 time)
  - Women's Iron Survivor Challenge (2025)
