= Damon Kemp =

American professional and former folkstyle wrestler

Personal information
- Full name: Robert Steveson Jr.
- Born: March 20, 1999 (age 27) Apple Valley, Minnesota, U.S.
- Education: University of Minnesota
- Parents: Robert Steveson; Laticia Steveson
- Relative: Gable Steveson (brother)
- Professional wrestling career
- Ring name(s): Bobby Steveson; Damon Kemp
- Billed height: 6 ft 0 in (183 cm)
- Billed weight: 220 lb (100 kg)
- Billed from: Apple Valley, Minnesota
- Trained by: WWE Performance Center
- Debut: December 24, 2021

Sport
- Country: United States
- Sport: Wrestling
- Event: Folkstyle

Robert Steveson Jr. (born March 20, 1999) is an American professional wrestler and former collegiate wrestler. He is currently working on the independent circuit under his real name, stylized as Bobby Steveson. He is best known for his time in the WWE under the ring name Damon Kemp. As a collegiate wrestler, he competed at the University of Minnesota, where he is a former National Collegiate Athletic Association (NCAA) qualifier. Steveson is the older brother of Olympic gold medalist and MMA fighter Gable Steveson.

== Early life and amateur wrestling career ==
Robert ("Bobby") Steveson Jr. was born and raised in Apple Valley, Minnesota to Robert and Laticia Steveson, where he and his younger brother Gable attended Apple Valley High School. During his high school years, Steveson distinguished himself in wrestling, securing three state championship titles and achieving national recognition by winning junior folk style national championships in 2013 and 2014.

Pursuing higher education at the University of Minnesota, Steveson continued his wrestling career. His collegiate achievements include qualifying for the NCAA championships in 2017 and earning letter winner status in both 2017 and 2018. Steveson also participated in open tournaments, winning at the Cobber Open and the Buena Vista Open in 2015, and finishing as a runner-up at the UNI Open the same year.

== Professional wrestling career ==
=== WWE (2021–2024) ===
Steveson signed with WWE in August 2021 as part of a new class of recruits for the WWE Performance Center. He worked as a face under the ring name Damon Kemp on the 205 Live, NXT 2.0 and NXT UK programs. While he became a member of the Diamond Mine in May 2022, he left the stable when he turned on his stablemates the Creed Brothers at Worlds Collide, turning heel. At NXT Halloween Havoc, Kemp lost to Julius Creed in the Ambulance match under the stipulation that if Julius loses, Brutus would have to leave NXT. After that, he joined the No Quarter Catch Crew (NQCC) stable.

As part of NQCC, Dempsey won the NXT Heritage Cup Championship and it was announced that it will be defended by the whole stable under the "Catch Clause". Under the Catch Clause, NQCC as a whole referred to themselves as the NXT Heritage Cup Champions but WWE only recognize Dempsey as the official champion. NQCC feuded with the stable The D'Angelo Family, resulting in a six-man tag team match between the two factions at Week 1 of Spring Breakin', which was won by The D'Angelo Family. After D'Angelo won the Heritage Cup, Kemp faced him for the title on the June 5 episode of NXT, but lost 2–0. On the June 25 episode of NXT, Tavion Heights defeated Kemp in an initiation match to officially join NQCC, which became Steveson's final match in WWE after he announced his departure from the company on July 8, when his contract was not renewed; an angle was done to write him off television on the following week's episode of NXT where he was taken out by his now-former stablemates Heights, Charlie Dempsey and Myles Borne in the parking lot and was put in the trunk of Dempsey's car.

=== Independent circuit (2025–present) ===
After being released by WWE, Steveson began to work on the independent circuit under the name Bobby Steveson.
