= Evolve (WWE brand) =

Professional wrestling brand

- Product type: Professional wrestling Sports entertainment
- Current owner: WWE
- Produced by: Paul "Triple H" Levesque; Gabe Sapolsky; Shawn Michaels
- Country: United States
- Introduced: March 5, 2025
- Related brands: Raw; SmackDown; NXT
- Tagline: First, a prospect is ID'd. Then they EVOLVE. (2025–present)
- General Manager; Timothy Thatcher Predecessor: Evolve Wrestling

Evolve is a developmental brand of the American professional wrestling promotion WWE that launched on March 5, 2025. Brands are divisions of WWE's roster where wrestlers are assigned to perform on a weekly basis. Wrestlers assigned to Evolve primarily appear on the brand's weekly television program, Evolve. The brand serves as a developmental program that features up and coming wrestlers from the WWE Performance Center and the WWE Independent Development and Next in Line systems competing in an attempt to be promoted to NXT, where advanced developmental wrestlers perform to prep for potential main roster call ups.

In addition to Evolve's main television program, the brand's wrestlers also appear on its supplementary reality show, WWE LFG along with the Independent Development and Next in Line recruits.

== History ==
In January 2025, it was reported that WWE were planning to revive independent wrestling promotion Evolve (also known as Evolve Wrestling) as a brand. The company trademarked the name "Evolve" on January 30, 2025, with the first set of Evolve tapings under WWE held at the WWE Performance Center in Orlando, Florida on February 7, replacing WWE NXT Level Up, which was cancelled in December 2024. During the Royal Rumble on February 1, WWE announced that the WWE Evolve program would premiere on Tubi on March 5 in the United States and on YouTube internationally.

In a press release on February 3, 2025, WWE revealed that the series would prominently feature up and coming wrestlers from the WWE Performance Center and recruits from the WWE Independent Development and WWE Next in Line systems. In this scenario, Evolve serves as an early stage developmental brand, with the goal being for the wrestlers featured on the Evolve program to move on to NXT (WWE's more advanced developmental brand), and eventually to the main roster on Raw or SmackDown.

In October 2025, Evolve was announced as a presenting brand of the WWE, AAA, and TNA co-promoted NXT Gold Rush television special.

== Championships ==
Evolve
Championship	Current champion(s)	Reign	Date Won	Days held	Days rec.	Location	Notes	Ref.
WWE Evolve Men's Championship	Harlem Lewis	1	July 15, 2026	144+	118+	Orlando, Florida	Defeated Aaron Rourke on Evolve. WWE recognizes Lewis' reign as beginning on July 15, when the episode aired on tape delay.	
WWE Evolve Women's Championship	Nikkita Lyons	1	May 29, 2026	165+	139+	Orlando, Florida	Defeated Wendy Choo at Evolve: Succession III. WWE recognizes Lyons's reign as beginning on June 24, 2026, when the event aired on tape delay.	

== Evolve special events ==
Event	Date	Venue	Location	Main event	Ref.
Evolve: Succession	October 15, 2025 (Air date)	WWE Performance Center	Orlando, Florida	Kali Armstrong (c) vs. Kendal Grey for the Evolve Women's Championship	
Evolve: Succession II	March 4, 2026 (Air date)	WWE Performance Center	Orlando, Florida	Jackson Drake (c) vs. Cappuccino Jones for the Evolve Men's Championship	
Evolve: Succession III	June 24, 2026 (Air date)	WWE Performance Center	Orlando, Florida	Aaron Rourke (c) vs. Max Abrams for the Evolve Men's Championship	
Evolve: ID Showcase Special	September 9, 2026 (Air date)	WWE Performance Center	Orlando, Florida	WWE ID 1.0 (Aaron Rourke, It's Gal, Marcus Mathers, and Sam Holloway) vs. The Mog Squad (CJ Valor, Jacari Ball, Max Abrams, and Santi Rivera)	
Evolve: Women's Showcase Special	September 23, 2026 (Air date)	WWE Performance Center	Orlando, Florida	Nikkita Lyons (c) vs. Skylar Raye for the Evolve Women's Championship	
Evolve: Succession IV	October 14, 2026 (Air date)	WWE Performance Center	Orlando, Florida	Nikkita Lyons (c) vs. Wendy Choo in a Last Woman Standing match for the Evolve Women's Championship	
