= Karmen Petrovic =

Bosnian-Canadian professional wrestler (born 1995)

Personal information
- Born: Monika Klisara; October 29, 1995 (age 31) Zenica, Bosnia and Herzegovina
- Education: Ryerson University

Professional wrestling career
- Ring name(s): Karmen Petrovic; Monika Klisara
- Billed height: 5 ft 2 in (157 cm)
- Billed from: Toronto, Ontario, Canada
- Trained by: WWE Performance Center; Sara Amato
- Debut: March 11, 2023

Monika Klisara (Serbo-Croatian: Monika Klisara / Моника Клисара; born October 29, 1995) is a Bosnian professional wrestler. She is signed to WWE, under the ring name Karmen Petrovic. She appears on WWE’s sister-promotion Lucha Libre AAA Worldwide where she is a member of Los Perros del Mal. After winning national championships in karate, Klisara made her professional wrestling debut in 2023, becoming the first Bosnian to perform in WWE.

== Early life ==
Monika Klisara was born on October 29, 1995 in Zenica, Bosnia and Herzegovina. She moved to Toronto, Canada in the mid-1990s to escape the Bosnian War. She is of Bosnian Croat and Bosnian Serb ethnicity. She attended Ryerson University.

== Martial arts career ==
Klisara is a former champion Karate competitor. At age 17, she was a member of the Canadian National and the Ontario Provincial Karate teams. She won gold medals at the Fonseca Cup competition, the Ontario Provincial competition and the Ontario Summer Olympic Games.

== Professional wrestling career ==
=== WWE (2022–present) ===
On November 10, 2022, Klisara was announced as having signed with WWE as part of the WWE Performance Center Fall 2022 Rookie Class, subsequently making her the first ever Bosnian signed to the company. Klisara made her professional wrestling debut on March 11, 2023 at a live event, teaming with Zoey Stark in a losing effort against Indi Hartwell and Lea Mitchell.

She made her on-screen debut under the ring name Karmen Petrovic on the July 28, 2023 episode of NXT Level Up, losing to Ivy Nile. On the October 17 episode of NXT, Petrovic won her first televised singles victory when she competed in the 2023 NXT Women's Breakout Tournament, during which she eliminated Jaida Parker in the first round. The following week in the semi final, Petrovic was eliminated by Lola Vice. On the July 2, 2024, episode of NXT, Petrovic went one on one with Jazmyn Nyx but lost due to interference from Jacy Jayne. This would set up for a tag team match between Petrovic with fellow Canadian Arianna Grace against Jazmyn Nyx and Jacy Jayne at NXT Heatwave on July 7, where Petrovic and Grace won. After the match, Grace and Petrovic had a disagreement on who contributed to the match victory, to which NXT General Manager Ava scheduled a match between them.

In late September, Petrovic started a romance storyline with Ashante "Thee" Adonis. On the November 19 episode of NXT, Petrovic and Adonis teamed up for the first time to defeat Brinley Reece and Dion Lennox in a mixed tag team match. On the January 14, 2025 episode of NXT, Adonis and Petrovic became an official on-screen couple. On the February 18 episode of NXT, Petrovic won a triple threat match against Jaida Parker and Kelani Jordan for a NXT Women's North American Championship match but failed to defeat Stephanie Vaquer for the title the following week. On the April 29 episode of NXT, Adonis scheduled a NXT Women's North American Championship match for Petrovic, who was not prepared for the match and went on to lose against the new NXT Women's North American Champion Sol Ruca. After the match, Petrovic attacked Adonis as he berated her, breaking up with him.

On the July 15 episode of NXT, Petrovic faced Evolve Women's Champion Kali Armstrong for the title but lost the match after interference from Jordynne Grace.

=== Total Nonstop Action Wrestling (2024) ===
Kilsara, as Karmen Petrovic, made her Total Nonstop Action Wrestling (TNA) debut on the September 5, 2024 episode of Impact! where she answered TNA Knockouts World Champion Jordynne Grace's championship open challenge where Grace won.

=== Independent circuit (2024) ===
Kilsara, as Karmen Petrovic, made her Game Changer Wrestling (GCW) debut at GCW Josh Barnett's Bloodsport XII on November 24, 2024, defeating Sumie Sakai by referee stoppage.

=== Lucha Libre AAA Worldwide (2026–present) ===
On the June 20, 2026, episode of Lucha Libre AAA, Petrovic appeared as a member of the revival of Los Perros del Mal with Daga, Berto, Angel, and Bronco Nima attacking El Grande Americano and establishing herself as a heel for that promotion; she had also turned heel for the first time in her WWE career a few weeks prior on NXT when she aligned with Nattie, Layla Diggs and Nikkita Lyons., at Heatwave she abandoned Nattie in favor of Los Perros Del Mal.

== Personal life ==
As of 2023, Klisara was in a relationship with Brazilian professional basketball player Bruno Caboclo.

== Championships and accomplishments ==
=== Martial arts record ===
- Ontario Summer Olympic Games
  - 1st place (Gold)
- Kubota World Cup
  - 1st place (Gold)
- Fonseca Cup
  - 1st place (Gold) (3-times)
  - "Overall Most Outstanding Competitor" award
- Canadian National Karate
  - 2nd place (Silver) (2-times)
- Pan-American Games
  - 5th place (qualified for the world cup)

=== Professional wrestling ===
- Pro Wrestling Illustrated
  - Ranked No. 167 of the top 250 female wrestlers in the PWI Women's 250 in 2025
