= Myles Borne =

American professional wrestler (born 1999)

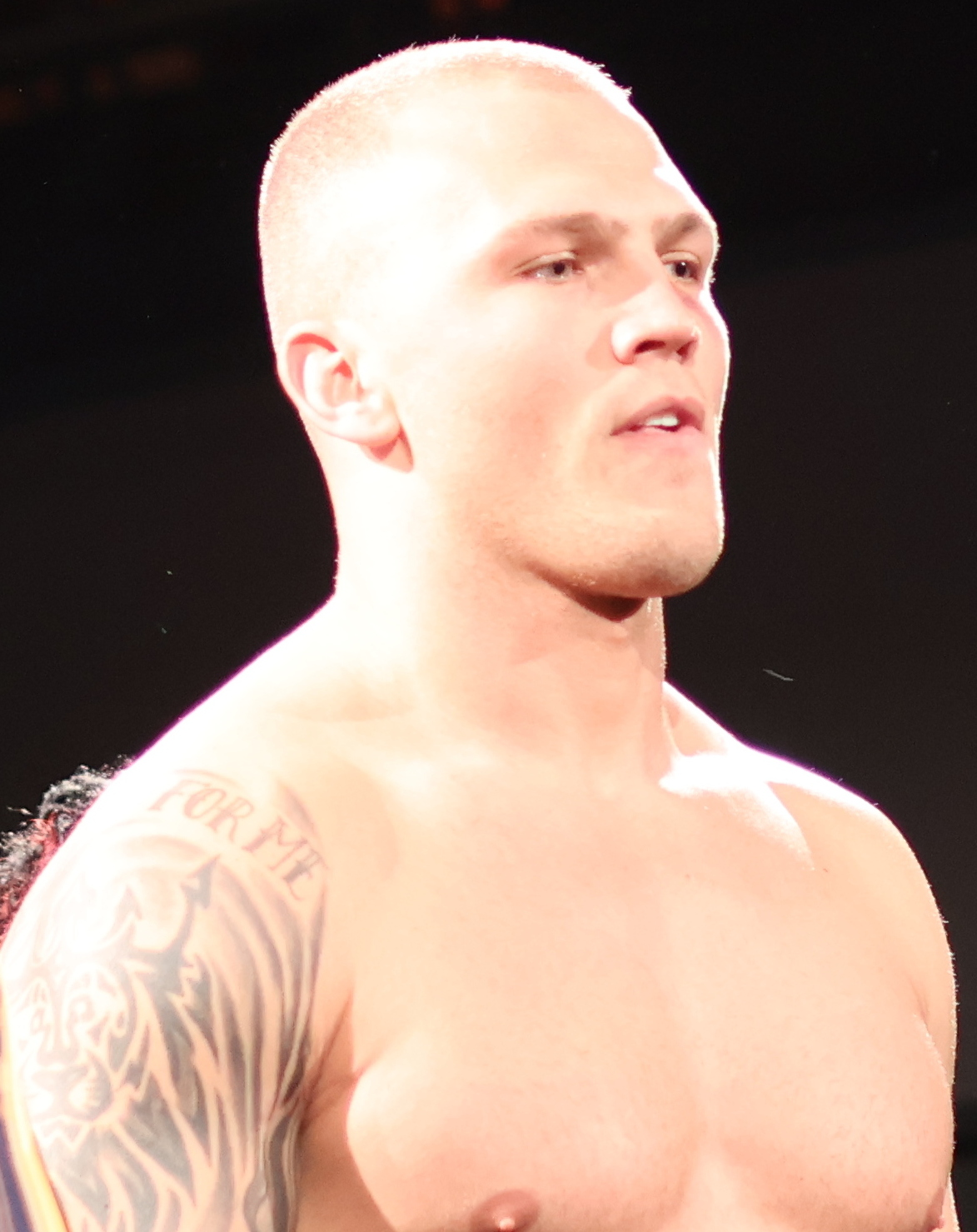
- Borne in 2024

Personal information
- Born: David Bostian III; May 25, 1999 (age 27) Wilmington, North Carolina, U.S.
- Spouse: Jadyn Bostian (m. 2023)

Professional wrestling career
- Ring name: Myles Borne
- Billed height: 6 ft 2 in (1.88 m)
- Billed weight: 227 lb (103 kg)
- Trained by: WWE Performance Center
- Debut: June 17, 2022

David Bostian III (born May 25, 1999) is an American professional wrestler signed to WWE, where he performs under the ring name Myles Borne on the NXT brand. He is a former one-time NXT North American Champion and a one-time NXT Tag Team Champion.

== Early life ==
Bostian was born in Wilmington, North Carolina with Persistent Pulmonary Hypertension of the Newborn. It is a treatable condition but one of the major side effects of the treatment is loss of hearing, resulting in Bostian being deaf. Bostian received hearing aids and would use an FM system while he was in school, allowing him to focus clearly on one person and read lips. He started wrestling while he was in kindergarten, competing all the way through high school. As a wrestler at Emsley A. Laney High School in Wilmington, he was allowed by the North Carolina High School Athletic Association to wear his FM transistor inside his headgear to be able to hear his coaches during matches.

== Professional wrestling career ==
=== WWE (2022–present) ===
On March 17, 2022, Bostian was announced among a class of recruits who reported to the WWE Performance Center to begin training with WWE. Bostian made his in-ring debut under the ring name Myles Borne on the June 17, 2022 episode of NXT Level Up, where he lost to Guru Raaj. Over the next year, Borne would mainly compete on NXT Level Up mostly in losing efforts with only one win on his record against Ikemen Jiro on the October 21 episode of NXT Level Up. In September 2023, Borne began to work with Drew Gulak, Charlie Dempsey and Damon Kemp as part of the stable No Quarter Catch Crew (NQCC).

A week later at NXT: Roadblock, NQCC announced that the NXT Heritage Cup will be defended by the whole stable under the "Catch Clause". Under the Catch Clause, NQCC as a whole referred to themselves as the NXT Heritage Cup Champions but WWE only recognize Dempsey as the official champion. On the May 6, 2025 episode of NXT, Borne won a 25-man battle royal to become the #1 contender for the NXT Championship. He faced Oba Femi for the title at NXT Battleground on May 25 in a losing effort. Due to the outpouring fan support for Borne, this effectively turned him and the rest of NQCC face. On the June 3 episode of NXT, Borne defeated Dempsey in a rounds match to leave NQCC.

Over the next few months, Borne began feuding with NXT North American Champion Ethan Page, who encouraged Borne to show off a more aggressive side to himself. On the February 24 episode of NXT, Borne defeated Page to win the title, the first championship of his wrestling career. Borne would later rekindle with former NQCC stablemate Tavion Heights to defeat The Vanity Project (Brad Baylor and Ricky Smokes) on the August 4, 2026 episode of NXT to win the NXT Tag Team Championship, making Borne a double champion in the process. At NXT Heatwave on August 30, Borne lost both titles to The Vanity Project: the NXT Tag Team Championship to Baylor and Smokes and the NXT North American Championship to Jackson Drake, ending both reigns at 25 and 186 days, respectively. Following his NXT North American Championship match, Borne took out Heights, teasing a heel turn. Two weeks later, Borne apologised to Heights only to immediately attack him, solidifying his heel turn.

=== Total Nonstop Action Wrestling (2024) ===
On the July 11, 2024 episode of TNA Impact!, Borne made an appearance for Total Nonstop Action Wrestling (TNA) to assist Charlie Dempsey to defeat The Rascalz's Zachary Wentz through interference.

=== Independent circuit (2024) ===
Borne made an appearance with Game Changer Wrestling (GCW) at Josh Barnett's Bloodsport XII on November 24, 2024, losing to Royce Isaacs by submission.

== Personal life ==
In May 2023, Bostian married his girlfriend, Jadyn. In 2025, Borne began dating fellow wrestler Stephanie Vaquer.

== Championships and accomplishments ==
- Pro Wrestling Illustrated
  - Ranked No. 100 of the top singles wrestlers in PWI 500 in 2026
- WWE
  - NXT North American Championship (1 time)
  - NXT Tag Team Championship (1 time) – with Tavion Heights
