= WWE Evolve Women's Championship =

Professional wrestling championship

- The WWE Evolve Women's Championship belt with default side plates.

Details
- Promotion: WWE
- Brand: Evolve
- Date established: Early 2025 (Note: The exact date it was established is unknown, but the title's unveiling aired on the May 7, 2025, episode of Evolve.)
- Current champion: Nikkita Lyons
- Date won: May 29, 2026 (aired June 24, 2026)
Statistics
- First champion: Kali Armstrong
- Longest reign: Nikkita Lyons (164 days) (Note: 138 days as recognized by WWE. As such, WWE officially recognizes Kendal Grey as the longest reigning champion at 146 days.)
- Shortest reign: Wendy Choo (70 days)
- Oldest champion: Wendy Choo (34 years, 61 days)
- Youngest champion: Kendal Grey (24 years, 100 days)

The WWE Evolve Women's Championship is a women's professional wrestling championship created and promoted by the American promotion WWE, defended on the developmental brand Evolve. The title was unveiled in early 2025 (aired May 7), and the inaugural champion was Kali Armstrong. The current champion is Nikkita Lyons, who is in her first reign. She defeated Wendy Choo at Evolve: Succession III on June 24, 2026 (taped May 29).

== History ==
In July 2020, the American professional wrestling company WWE acquired the independent promotion Evolve. In March 2025, WWE launched a developmental brand called Evolve, a relaunch of the former promotion, featuring WWE Performance Center trainees, as well as wrestlers signed to the WWE Independent Development program. On the May 7, 2025, episode of Evolve (tape date unknown), the brand's Prime Minister Stevie Turner announced the creation of men's and women's Evolve Championships. The titles were designed to be defended exclusively on the Evolve brand, offering more opportunities for WWE rookie talent, giving them increased exposure and opportunities.

During the May 28 episode of Evolve (taped April 25), Kali Armstrong became the inaugural champion by defeating Wendy Choo, Kendal Grey, and Kylie Rae, who she last eliminated, in a fatal four-way elimination match. The Evolve Women's Championship became the first Evolve championship to be defended on the NXT brand on the July 15 episode of NXT, where Armstrong defeated Karmen Petrovic by disqualification after interference from Jordynne Grace.

== Belt design ==
The Evolve Women's Championship belt design is nearly identical to the men's WWE Evolve Championship, consisting of the WWE Evolve logo at the center of the center plate with the words "Women's" and "Champion" on the top and bottom of the plate, respectively. There are four side plates. Like all of WWE's championship belts, the inner side plates feature a removable center section that can be customized with the champion's logo; the default plates feature the WWE logo over a globe. The outer side plates also feature the WWE logo but not on a globe. Also like WWE's other women's championships, the plates are smaller than the men's and on a white strap instead of black.

== Reigns ==
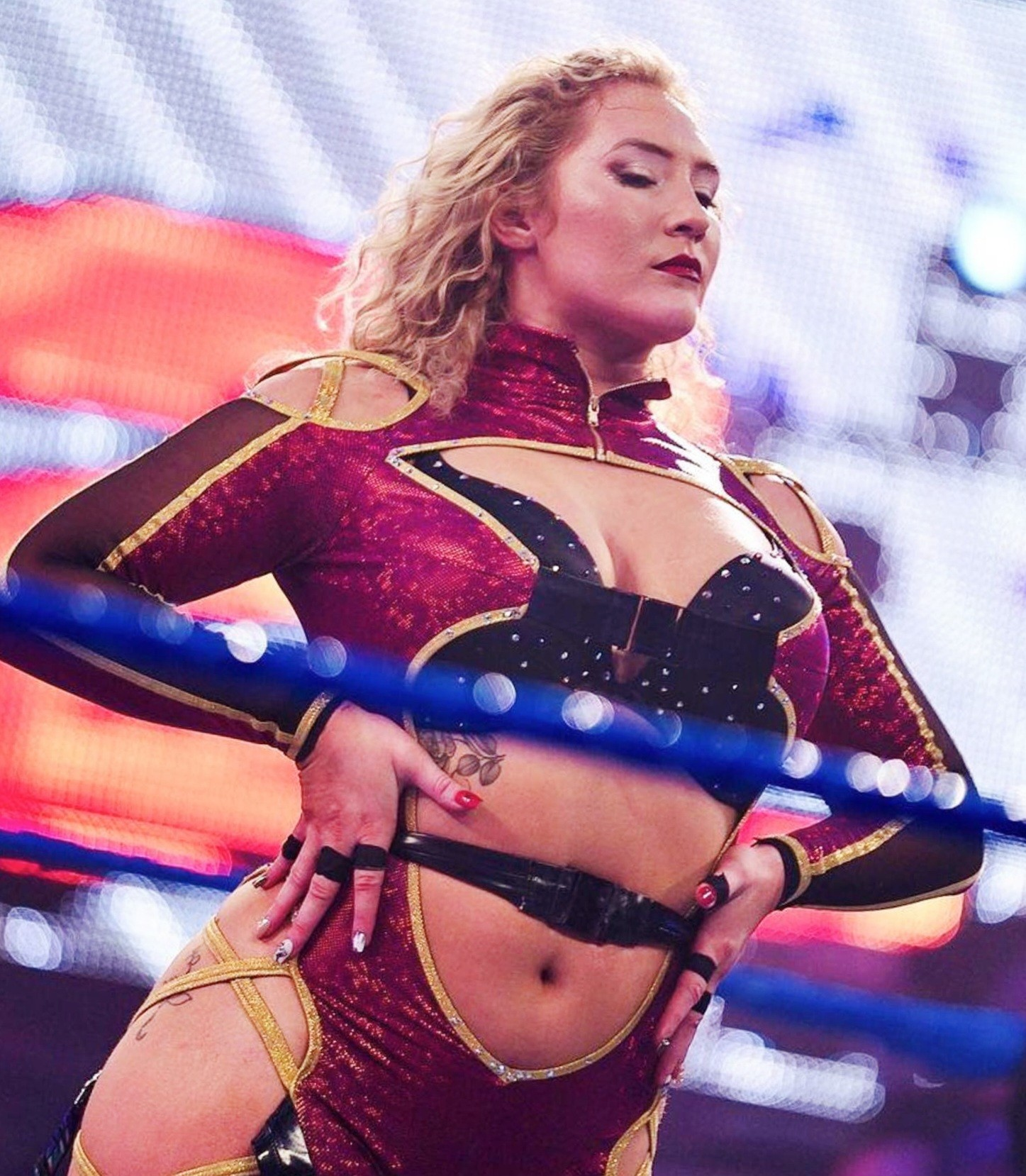
Current champion Nikkita Lyons

As of November 19, 2026, there have been four reigns and one vacancy. Kali Armstrong was the inaugural champion. Nikkita Lyons' ongoing reign is the longest at 174+ days. Wendy Choo has the shortest reign at 70 days and is the oldest champion at 34, while Grey is the youngest at 24.

Nikkita Lyons is the current champion in her first reign. She won the title by defeating Wendy Choo at Evolve: Succession III, which was taped on May 29, 2026, in Orlando, Florida and aired on tape delay on June 24, 2026.

Key
No.	Overall reign number
Reign	Reign number for the specific champion
Days	Number of days held
Days recog.	Number of days held recognized by the promotion
+	Current reign is changing daily

No.	Champion	Championship change			Reign statistics			Notes	Ref.
No.	Champion	Date	Event	Location	Reign	Days	Days recog.	Notes	Ref.
WWE: Evolve
1	Kali Armstrong	April 25, 2025	Evolve	Orlando, FL	1	151	139	Defeated Wendy Choo, Kendal Grey, and Kylie Rae, who she last pinned, in a fatal four-way elimination match to become the inaugural champion. WWE recognizes Armstrong's reign as beginning on May 28, 2025, and ending on October 15, 2025, when the episodes aired on tape delay.	
2	Kendal Grey	September 23, 2025	Evolve: Succession	Orlando, FL	1	150	146	WWE recognizes Grey's reign as beginning on October 15, 2025, and ending on March 11, 2026, when the episodes aired on tape delay.	
—	Vacated	February 20, 2026	Evolve	Orlando, FL	—	—	—	Kendal Grey relinquished the title as she became a full-time member of the NXT brand. Aired on tape delay on March 11, 2026. Grey continued to carry the title on NXT until the March 10 episode.	
3	Wendy Choo	March 20, 2026	Evolve	Orlando, FL	1	70	69	Last pinned Nikkita Lyons in an eight-woman Gauntlet match to win the vacant title. WWE recognizes Choo's reign as beginning on April 15, 2026, and ending on June 24, 2026, when the episodes aired on tape delay.	
4	Nikkita Lyons	May 29, 2026	Evolve: Succession III	Orlando, FL	1	174+	148+	WWE recognizes Lyons's reign as beginning on June 24, 2026, when the episode aired on tape delay.	

== See also ==
- Women's championships in WWE
- Women in WWE
