= Charlie Dempsey (wrestler) =

American professional wrestler (born 1996)

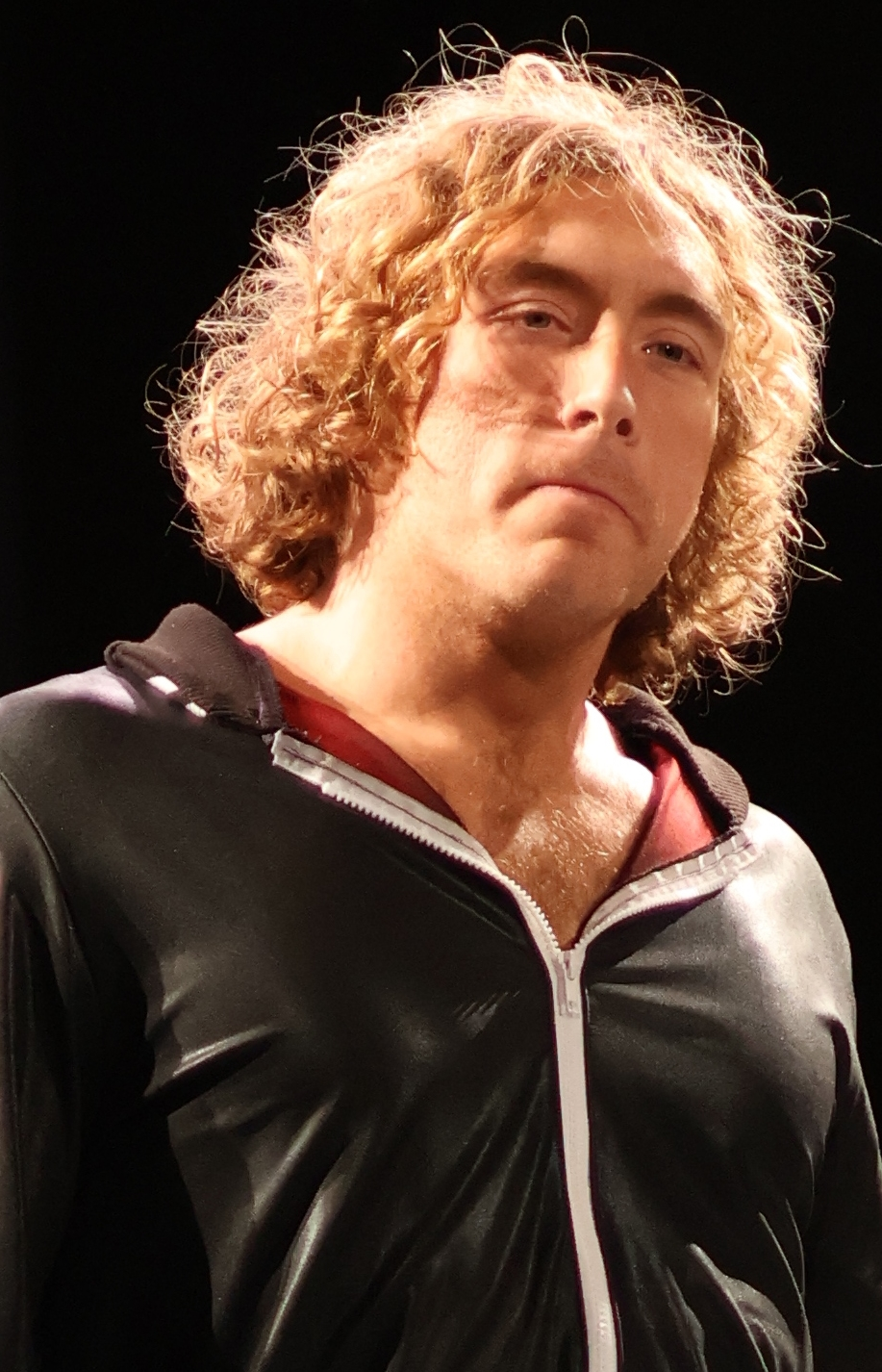
- Dempsey in 2024

Personal information
- Born: Bailey Matthews; December 30, 1996 (age 29) Atlanta, Georgia, U.S.
- Parent: William Regal (father)

Professional wrestling career
- Ring names: Bailey Matthews; Charlie Dempsey; Joe Bailey
- Billed weight: 208 lb (94 kg)
- Billed from: Blackpool, England
- Trained by: William Regal
- Debut: 9 February 2018

Bailey Matthews (born December 30, 1996) is an American professional wrestler. He is signed to WWE, where he performs on the NXT brand under the ring name Charlie Dempsey and is a member of the BirthRight stable. Dempsey is a former two time NXT Heritage Cup Champion.

A second-generation wrestler and the son of English professional wrestler William Regal, Matthews made his professional wrestling debut in 2018 and signed with the WWE in 2021.

== Early life ==
Bailey Matthews was born on December 30, 1996, in Atlanta, Georgia, the son of Christina Beddoes and professional wrestler William Regal.

== Professional wrestling career ==
=== Early career (2018–2022) ===
Matthews made his professional wrestling debut on February 9, 2018, under the ring name Joe Bailey. Throughout 2019 and 2020, Bailey made appearances in All Star Wrestling (ASW), Progress Wrestling, Westside Xtreme Wrestling (wXw), and Evolve. In 2020, Matthews joined New Japan Pro-Wrestling (NJPW) as a Young Lion. However, he would never end up appearing for the company, as he later left for WWE. In 2022, Matthews returned to Progress Wrestling, under his Charlie Dempsey ring name. He competed in the Super Strong Style 16 Tournament, where he defeated Charles Crowley in the first round and was defeated by Chris Ridgeway in the quarterfinal.

=== WWE ===
==== NXT UK (2021–2022) ====
In January 2021, Matthews signed with WWE, where he was assigned to the NXT UK brand. Matthews later reverted to the ring name Charlie Dempsey. Dempsey made his debut on February 25, 2021 edition of NXT UK, where he was defeated by Tyler Bate. Dempsey later joined Teoman and Rohan Raja to form Die Familie and began a feud with Gallus, establishing himself as a heel in the process. On the 18 November edition of NXT UK, Die Familie defeated Gallus in their first ever match as a team. Die Familie also started a feud with A-Kid. On the 10 March 2022 edition of NXT UK, Dempsey defeated A-Kid. Dempsey was later challenged by A-Kid to a British Rounds Rules match. This took place on the 21 April edition of NXT UK, where Dempsey won 2–1 in the sixth round. Dempsey competed in a tournament for the NXT United Kingdom Championship, where he lost to Oliver Carter in his final match for NXT UK.

==== No Quarter Catch Crew (2022–2026) ====
In August 2022, Dempsey moved to the NXT brand. On the February 14, 2023 edition of NXT, Dempsey started associating with Drew Gulak, where Gulak served as a teacher for Dempsey. On the 18 April 2023 edition of NXT, Dempsey challenged Wes Lee for the NXT North American Championship, which he lost. In the following months, Dempsey and Gulak formed No Quarter Catch Crew (NQCC), where they would later be joined by Myles Borne and Damon Kemp. Throughout August and September, Dempsey competed in the NXT Global Heritage Invitational to crown a #1 Contender for the NXT Heritage Cup. Dempsey came up empty-handed as he lost to the likes of Axiom (formerly A-Kid), Tyler Bate, and Butch. On the December 13, 2023 edition of NXT, Dempsey was involved in a triple threat match for the NXT North American Championship with Joe Coffey and the NXT North American Champion Dragon Lee, who retained his title.

On the February 27, 2024 edition of NXT, Dempsey defeated The Meta-Four's Noam Dar 2–1 in a British Rounds Rules match to become the new NXT Heritage Cup Champion. At NXT: Roadblock, NQCC announced that the NXT Heritage Cup will be defended by the whole stable under the "Catch Clause". Under the Catch Clause, NQCC as a whole referred to themselves as the NXT Heritage Cup Champions but WWE only recognize Dempsey as the official champion. The Catch Clause was invoked on the 19 March episode of NXT, with Gulak defeating Chase University's Riley Osborne 2–1 to successfully defend the Cup. On the 16 April episode of NXT, The D'Angelo Family leader Tony D'Angelo revealed that his Family were hired by NQCC to (kayfabe) eliminate Gulak. In reality, Gulak was written off following allegations from Ronda Rousey that Gulak grabbed her pants' drawstrings backstage in 2022. Gulak subsequently left WWE on 3 May. D'Angelo demanded payment for the job but NQCC refused, causing a brawl between the two factions and resulting in a six-man tag team match between the two factions at Week 1 of Spring Breakin', which was won by The D'Angelo Family (D'Angelo, Channing "Stacks" Lorenzo and Luca Crusifino). On the 7 May episode of NXT, Dempsey and Borne faced Tyson DuPont and Tyrek Igwe in a tag team match. Before the match started, the match referee was declared "unavailable" and Stacks was announced as the special guest referee, costing Dempsey and Borne the match through a fast count. After the match, an irate Dempsey gave D'Angelo a title shot at the NXT Heritage Cup as payment due to the D'Angelo Family and invoked the Catch Clause, which was nullified when D'Angelo and his Family kidnapped Kemp and Borne later that night. One week later, D'Angelo defeated Dempsey 2–1 to win the Cup, ending Dempsey's reign at 76 days. After the loss of the Cup, Dempsey declared that the stable needs structure and a chain of command and assumed a leadership role. He then ordered Kemp to face D'Angelo in a rematch for the Cup but Kemp lost the match 0–2 on the 4 June episode of NXT. On the 13 August episode of NXT, Dempsey defeated Tony D’Angelo 2–1 to win the NXT Heritage Cup for the second time after some outside interference from new stablemate Wren Sinclair.

On the December 24 episode of NXT, Lexis King, with Dempsey's father William Regal as his cornerman, faced Dempsey in a rematch for the NXT Heritage Cup. Regal passed his brass knuckles for King to use against Dempsey but King refused. Regal then punched King, to which the brass knuckles fell into the ring. The referee saw Dempsey pick up the brass knuckles and assumed that Dempsey used it on King and disqualified Dempsey. In British Round Rules, the Cup change hands upon disqualification of the reigning champion, resulting in King becoming the new NXT Heritage Cup Champion, ending Dempsey's second reign at 134 days. This is also the first instance of the NXT Heritage Cup changing hands due to disqualification. However, due to a grey area in British Round Rules on whether the Cup changes hand upon disqualification of the reigning champion, NXT general manager Ava ordered King to return the Cup back to Dempsey and announced that they will compete for the Cup in a one-fall match at NXT: New Year's Evil on January 7, 2025, where he lost the Cup back to King. WWE does not recognize this change.

Following NXT Battleground, Dempsey and the rest of No Quarter Catch Crew effectively turned face due to the outpouring of support for Myles Borne during his NXT Championship match against Oba Femi despite failing to win the title. On the June 3 episode of NXT, Borne defeated Dempsey "British Rounds Rules" match, thus leaving No Quarter Catch Crew. It was meant to settle Borne's ambition to be a singles competitor independent of the group while Dempsey could test him in a match style that was in his favor.

==== BirthRight (2026–present) ====
On the March 10, 2026 episode of NXT, Dempsey reunited with Tavion Heights to face BirthRight (Lexis King and Uriah Connors) in a tag team match. During the match, Dempsey attacked Heights and joined the BirthRight stable after the match, turning heel again. The stable consists of second generation WWE wrestlers–Dempsey as the son of William Regal; King as the son of Brian Pillman; Connors as the son of Fit Finlay; Channing "Stacks" Lorenzo and his fiancé Arianna Grace, the daughter of Santino Marella. At the NXT Stand & Deliver countdown show on April 4, BirthRight teamed together for the first time where they lost to Hank and Tank, Shiloh Hill, EK Prosper, and Wren Sinclair in a 10-person mixed tag team match.

=== All Japan Pro Wrestling (2023–2024) ===
Dempsey made his return to Japan with All Japan Pro Wrestling (AJPW) on December 31, 2023, where he teamed up with Yuma Anzai to face Tatsumi Fujinami and his son Leona in a winning effort. At AJPW's New Year Giant Series, Dempsey challenged Katsuhiko Nakajima for the Triple Crown Heavyweight Championship, which Nakajima won.

=== Total Nonstop Action Wrestling (2024) ===
Dempsey made his Total Nonstop Action Wrestling (TNA) debut on the July 4, 2024 episode of TNA Impact! where he attacked Leon Slater and Trey Miguel during their match. After the attack, Miguel's tag team partner Zachary Wentz (who formerly wrestled on NXT as Nash Carter), challenged Dempsey to a match. On the following week, Dempsey defeated Wentz in his TNA in-ring debut after interference from Myles Borne.

=== Game Changer Wrestling (2024) ===
Dempsey made his Game Changer Wrestling (GCW) debut at Josh Barnett's Bloodsport X on April 4, 2024, beating Matt Makowski by submission.

He then made another appearance at Josh Barnett's Bloodsport XII on November 24, defeating Tracy Williams by submission.

== Other media ==
Matthews, as Charlie Dempsey, made his video game debut as a playable character in WWE 2K25 and later appeared in WWE 2K26.

== Championships and accomplishments ==
- Pro Wrestling Illustrated
  - Ranked No. 146 of the top 500 singles wrestlers in the PWI 500 in 2025
- WWE
  - NXT Heritage Cup (2 times)
