= WWE NXT Level Up =

Professional wrestling streaming television series

- Created by: Vince McMahon; Paul "Triple H" Levesque
- Opening theme: "Level Up" by def rebel (from WWE Music Group)
- Country of origin: United States
- No. of seasons: 3
- No. of episodes: 150

Production
- Executive producers: Paul "Triple H" Levesque; Lee Fitting
- Camera setup: Multicamera setup
- Running time: 30–60 minutes

Original release
- Network: Peacock (US); WWE Network (International)
- Release: February 18, 2022 – December 27, 2024

Related
- WWE LFG; WWE 205 Live; WWE Raw; WWE SmackDown; WWE NXT; WWE Main Event; WWE Evolve; WWE Speed

WWE NXT Level Up, also known simply as NXT Level Up (stylized as NXT LVL UP), is an American professional wrestling streaming television program that was produced by the American promotion WWE, running from February 18, 2022, to December 27, 2024. The program featured younger and lower-card performers from the promotion's NXT brand division with matches taped either before or after the preceding episode of NXT. Episodes were uploaded on Fridays at 10 p.m. Eastern Time (ET) on Peacock in the United States and the WWE Network internationally.

The show premiered on February 18, 2022, as a replacement for 205 Live, and it went head-to-head with rival promotion All Elite Wrestling's program, Rampage. The show was canceled, airing its final broadcast on December 27, 2024; its purpose was supplanted by two separate programs—the reality series WWE LFG, and the new in-ring program WWE Evolve.

== History ==
In October 2019, WWE's 205 Live brand merged under the NXT brand with the 205 Live streaming television show becoming a supplementary show of NXT. On February 15, 2022, WWE announced that 205 Live would be replaced by a new show called NXT Level Up, which would stream in 205 Live's former Friday night slot at 10:00 p.m. Eastern Time (ET) on Peacock in the United States and the WWE Network internationally, airing directly after SmackDown. The show premiered on February 18, 2022. The commentators for the show were Blake Howard and Byron Saxton, and the ring announcer was Sarah Schreiber. In the main event of the inaugural episode, Edris Enofé defeated Kushida.

After SmackDown LowDown started airing live after SmackDown with the subsequent show moving to the USA Network in September 2024, NXT Level Up aired after SmackDown LowDown at 10:40 p.m. ET.

On December 20, 2024, it was reported that NXT Level Up was being canceled (with its final episode airing on December 27, 2024), in order to allow NXT resources to be reallocated to WWE's upcoming A&E reality series WWE LFG (which features up and coming wrestlers competing for an NXT contract while training alongside WWE alumni). NXT Level Up would be succeeded in concept by WWE Evolve, a new in-ring show and brand introduced in March 2025 that features developmental talent from the WWE Performance Center and WWE ID system.

== Episodes ==
Season	Episodes	First aired	Last aired
1	46	February 18, 2022	December 30, 2022
2	52	January 6, 2023	December 29, 2023
3	52	January 5, 2024	December 27, 2024

== Special episodes ==
- Series premiere – February 18, 2022: The first episode of NXT Level Up.
- Series finale – December 27, 2024: The final episode of NXT Level Up.

During 2023's Thanksgiving weekend and New Year holidays, clip shows aired in their place. These were hosted by Blake Howard.

- November 24, 2023: Featured Eddy Thorpe vs. Dante Chen from February 17, 2023, Ivy Nile vs. Lola Vice from April 28, 2023, Wendy Choo vs. Kelani Jordan from May 12, 2023, and Axiom vs. Tavion Heights from July 14, 2023.
- December 29, 2023: The final episode of 2023. Featured Sol Ruca and Dani Palmer vs. Lash Legend and Jakara Jackson from April 7, 2023, Nathan Frazer vs. Tavion Heights from June 9, 2023, Jacy Jayne vs. Karmen Petrovic from August 18, 2023, and two instalments of Axiom vs. Riley Osborne from October 13 and October 27, 2023, respectively.
