= WWE Evolve =

Professional wrestling streaming television program

- Created by: Paul "Triple H" Levesque; Gabe Sapolsky
- Based on: Evolve
- Presented by: Blake Howard (play-by-play commentator); Robert Stone (color commentator)
- Starring: Evolve roster
- Country of origin: United States
- No. of seasons: 2
- No. of episodes: 54

Production
- Executive producers: Paul "Triple H" Levesque; Lee Fitting; Gabe Sapolsky; Shawn Michaels
- Production location: WWE Performance Center
- Camera setup: Multicamera setup
- Production company: World Wrestling Entertainment, LLC

Original release
- Network: Tubi
- Release: March 5, 2025 – present

Related
- WWE Raw; WWE SmackDown; WWE NXT; WWE Main Event

WWE Evolve, also known simply as Evolve (stylized as EVOLVE), is an American professional wrestling streaming television program produced by the American company WWE. It features wrestlers from the promotion's Evolve brand division, to which WWE wrestlers are assigned to work and perform. Episodes are uploaded on Wednesdays at 8:00 p.m. Eastern Time (ET) on Tubi in the United States and on YouTube internationally. Unlike most of WWE's other in-ring shows, which air live, episodes of Evolve are often pre-taped in batches of three to four episodes per taping with some exceptions.

The series serves as a spiritual successor to the Evolve professional wrestling promotion, which operated from 2010 to 2020 and is headed by Gabe Sapolsky, the owner of the original promotion; WWE acquired Evolve in July 2020. Evolve serves as a developmental show, featuring up and coming wrestlers from the WWE Performance Center and the WWE Independent Development system competing in an attempt to be promoted to NXT, where advanced developmental wrestlers perform to prep for potential main roster call ups.

Due to Evolve being taped ahead of time, released superstars can still appear on broadcast, as was notably the case with former Women's ID Champion, Laynie Luck. To prevent spoilers, photography is banned. Initially, the crowd consisted of the talent's family and friends. However, by June 2026, the public could register for tickets.

== History ==
In 2009, former Ring of Honor booker Gabe Sapolsky announced the creation of a professional wrestling promotion called Evolve (stylized EVOLVE), which officially began producing shows in January 2010. Over the years, Evolve would unify with Dragon Gate USA, form a partnership with WWE, and have many notable wrestlers pass through the promotion, such as Cody Rhodes, Johnny Gargano, and Drew McIntyre. In 2019, Evolve aired Evolve 131, their first live broadcast on the WWE Network streaming service, and then as a result of hardships caused by the COVID-19 pandemic, the promotion was purchased by WWE on July 2, 2020.

Sapolsky was released but then rehired by WWE in 2022, with rumors that WWE were planning to revive Evolve, with the project being headed by Sapolsky. On January 30, 2025, WWE filed a trademark for "Evolve" in the aspect of entertainment services. It was then officially revealed that Evolve would be revived as a WWE brand with its first tapings held on February 7 at the WWE Performance Center in Orlando, Florida. During the Royal Rumble on February 1, 2025, WWE announced that a new in-ring series titled WWE Evolve would premiere on March 5 on Tubi in the United States and it was later revealed that it would air on YouTube internationally. The program airs head-to-head against rival promotion All Elite Wrestling's (AEW) flagship weekly show, Dynamite, which airs on Wednesdays at 8 p.m. Eastern Time (ET) on TBS and Max.

In a press release on February 3, 2025, WWE revealed that the series would prominently feature up and coming wrestlers from the WWE Performance Center and the WWE Independent Development (ID) system. The goal is for the Evolve wrestlers to make it to WWE's primary developmental brand, NXT, and eventually to the main roster on Raw or SmackDown. The commentators for Evolve were revealed as Peter Rosenberg and Robert Stone.

On October 15, 2025, Evolve hosted its first Tubi special, Succession.

== Roster ==
The wrestlers featured on WWE Evolve take part in scripted feuds and storylines. Wrestlers are portrayed as heroes, villains, or less distinguishable characters in scripted events that build tension and culminate in a wrestling match.

The primary commentators for Evolve are Blake Howard and Robert Stone.

== See also ==
- List of professional wrestling television series
