= Taeler Hendrix =

American professional wrestler and valet (born 1989)

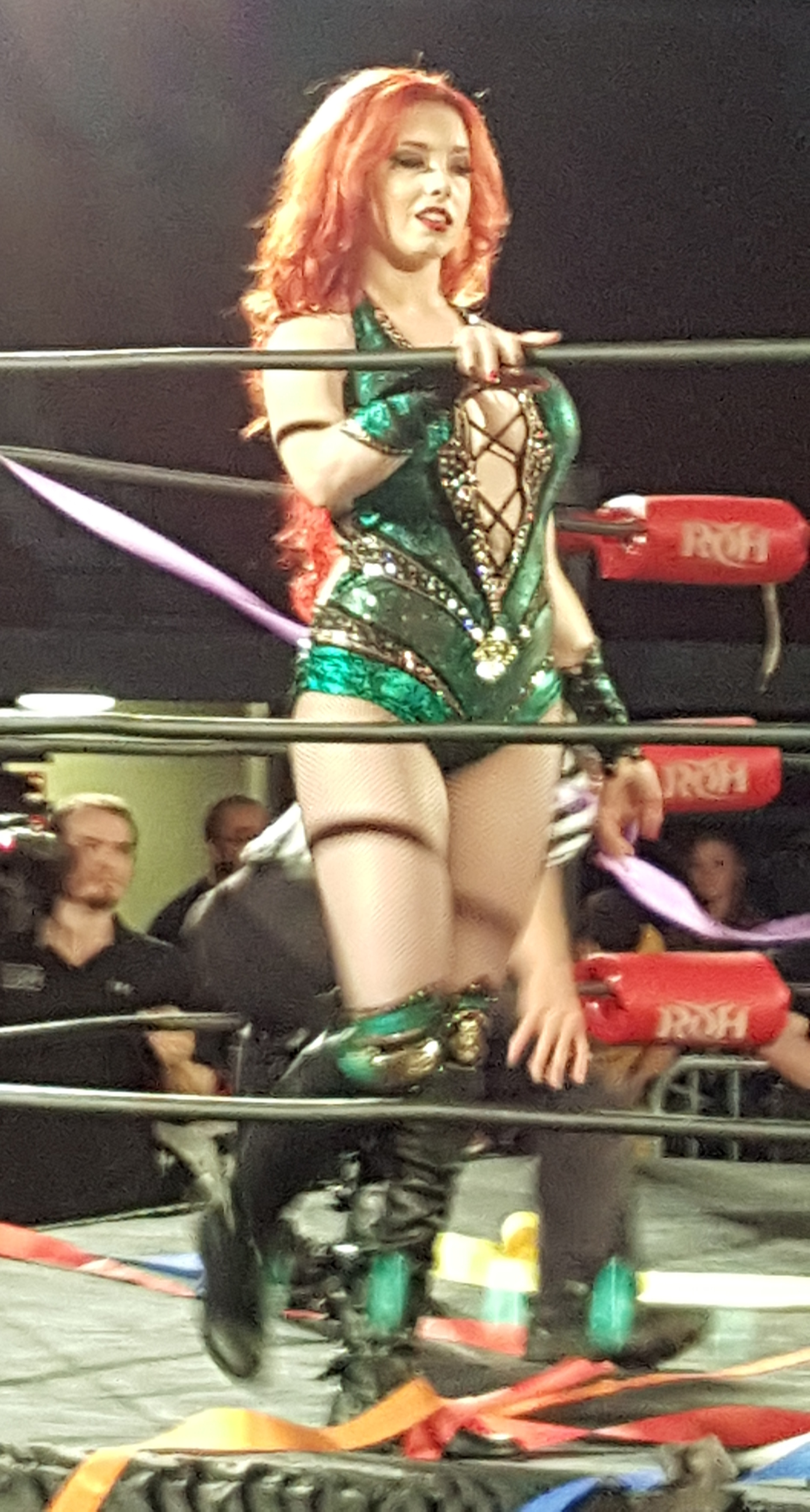
- Hendrix in 2015

Personal information
- Born: Taeler Conrad-Mellen; June 7, 1989 (age 37) New Bedford, Massachusetts, U.S.

Professional wrestling career
- Ring name(s): Taeler; Taeler Cassidy; Taeler Hendrix; Taeler Thomas; Vanessa Hendrix Wundor
- Billed height: 5 ft 7 in (1.70 m)
- Billed weight: 173 lb (78 kg; 12.4 st)
- Billed from: Seattle, Washington; South Boston, Massachusetts (ROH)
- Trained by: Matt West; Kyle White; Evan Sixx; Bob Evans; Rip Rogers; Spike Dudley; Nick Dinsmore; Al Snow
- Debut: 2007

Taeler Conrad-Mellen (born June 7, 1989), is an American author and former professional wrestler and valet, better known by the ring name Taeler Hendrix. She is best known for her time in Ring of Honor (ROH).

Starting her career in 2007, she spent her first years working on the independent circuit for promotions including New England Championship Wrestling (NECW), Top Rope Promotions (TRP), Collision Pro Wrestling (CPW), and World Women's Wrestling (WWW), before being signed to a contract by Ohio Valley Wrestling (OVW), a Total Nonstop Action Wrestling (TNA) developmental territory, in 2011. In November 2011, Hendrix won the OVW Women's Championship, holding the championship for 203 days.

On the June 21, 2012, episode of Total Nonstop Action Wrestling's Impact Wrestling television program, Hendrix took part in the Gut Check Challenge in an attempt to get a contract with the promotion, facing Tara in a losing effort. The following week, the storyline Gut Check Challenge judges decided to sign Hendrix to a contract, due to her performance.

== Professional wrestling career ==
=== Early career (2008–2010) ===
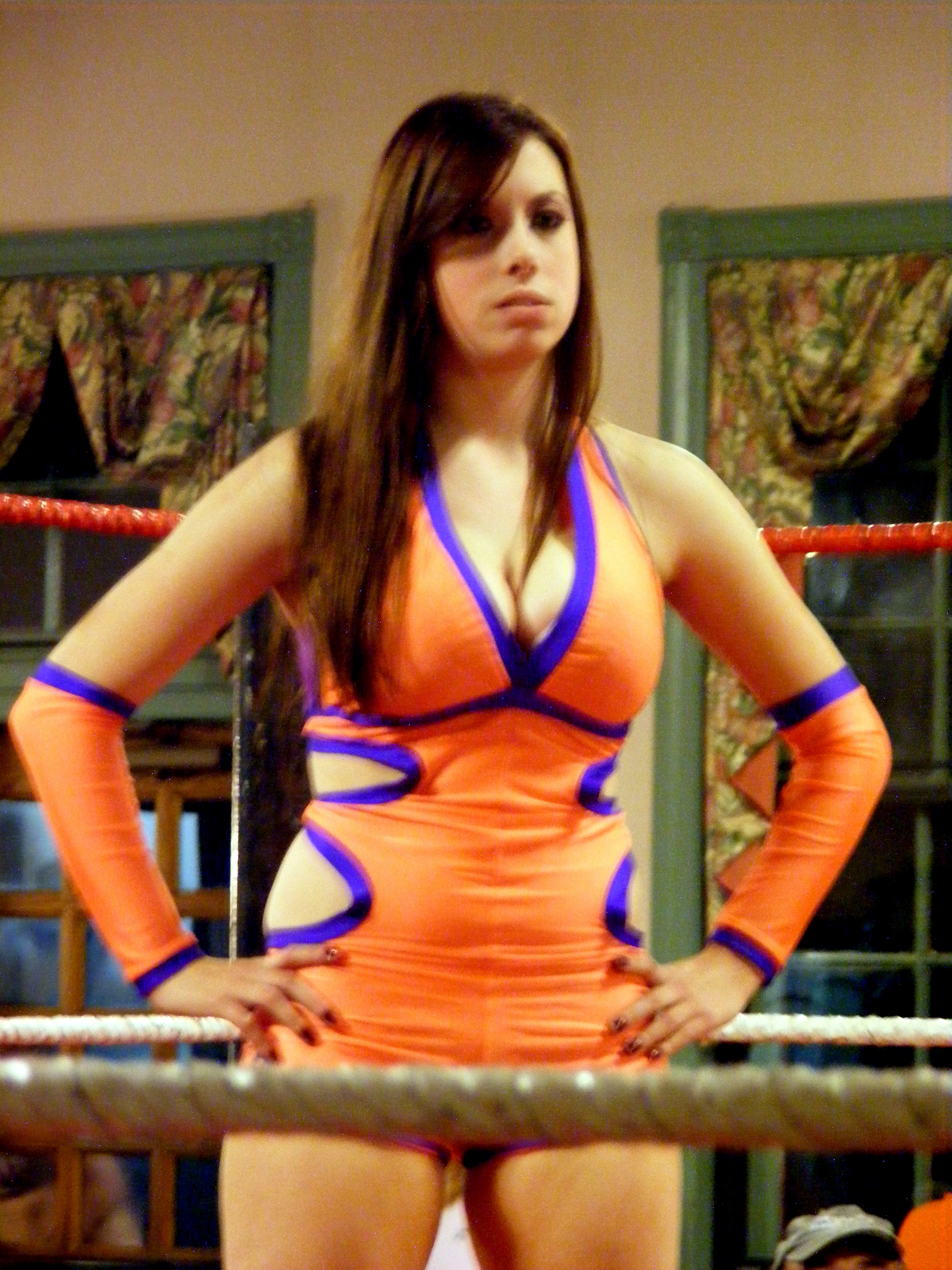
Taeler Hendrix at an ASW show in November 2009

Conrad-Mellen made her professional wrestling debut on April 26, 2008, at New England Championship Wrestling under the ring name Taeler Hendrix, where she accompanied Brandon Webb in a losing effort to "Exotic" Kristian Frost. On July 11, 2008, Hendrix debuted in Top Rope Promotions, where she teamed up with TRP Interstate champion Freight Train in a losing effort to the team of Lea Morrison and Gorgeous Gino Giovanni. On July 14, 2008, at Top Rope Promotions, Hendrix teamed up with The Kreeper in a winning effort defeating the team of Lea Morrison and Alex Payne. On July 18, she teamed up with Vain to in a winning effort defeating Buck Nasty and Lea Morrison in an inter gender tag team match. On July 19 at TRP Spindle City Rumble, Hendrix competed against Luscious Latasha in a losing effort in a singles match.

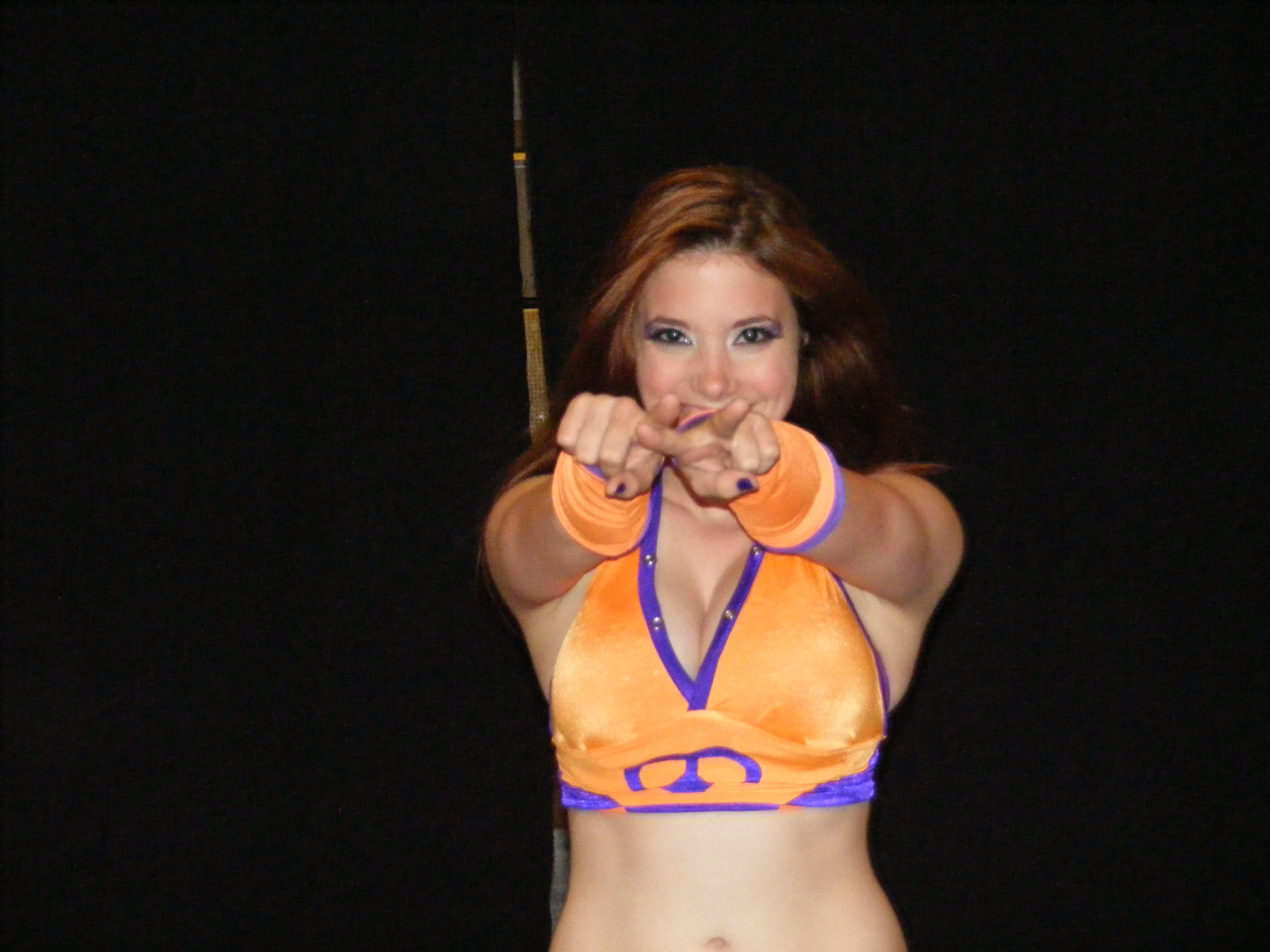
Hendrix in June 2010

She made her debut for the World Women's Wrestling promotion on November 1, challenging Ariel for the World Women's Wrestling Championship. She won the match by disqualification, and as a result, did not win the championship. On November 30, Hendrix competed against Jana in a winning effort. On December 13, she defeated Ariel in a non-title match. On January 10, 2009, Hendrix teamed up with Alexxis Nevaeh in a winning effort defeating Nikki Valentine and Sammi Lane. On February 21, Ariel defeated Hendrix in a Women's Championship match. On March 21, Hendrix teamed up with Barndon Locke in a losing effort to Scott Levesque and Sammi Lane. On July 11, Hendrix teamed up with Alexxis Nevaeh and Amber in a winning effort defeating the team of Ariel, Mistress Belmont, and Sammi Lane in a six-woman tag team match. On January 23, 2010, she defeated Amber in her last appearance in the promotion. On June 25, at Showcase Championship Wrestling, Taeler got her biggest win in her career over former TNA Women's Knockout Champion – Awesome Kong.

On April 29, 2011, Hendrix made appearance at Chaotic Wrestling, where she competed in a losing effort to Lexxus. Months later, she challenged her for the Chaotic Wrestling Women's Championship, but was unsuccessful in winning the title. On June 25, Hendrix began a huge rivalry with Mistress Belmont, over the PWF Northeast Wrestling. On August 13, their rivalry ended up in a Loser Leaves match, which Taeler lost forcing her to leave the promotion. On July 4, Hendrix defeated Amber; on July 19, she defeated Mercedes KV via submission; on July 23, she defeated Ivy via her Spinning heel kick–finisher. On August 12, Hendrix was unsuccessful in winning the Chaotic Wrestling Women's Championship after she lost to the defending champion Alexxis Nevaeh.

=== Ohio Valley Wrestling ===
==== Women's Champion and Relationship with Dylan Bostic (2010–2013) ====
On December 10, 2010, Hendrix received a tryout in Ohio Valley Wrestling, at OVW Episode 591, losing to the OVW Women's Champion Lady JoJo in a dark match.

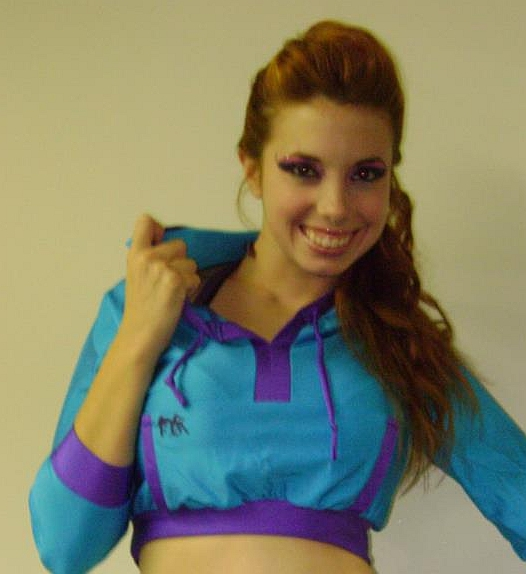
Hendrix in October 2011

Hendrix returned to the promotion on September 24, 2011, at the tapings of OVW episode 631, losing to Izza Belle Smothers in another dark match. Week later, at the tapings of OVW episode 632, Hendrix made her television debút, defeating Lady JoJo in a non–title match. After pinning JoJo in a tag team match at OVW episode 633 Hendrix received a match for the OVW Women's Championship at OVW episode 634 on October 15, which she won via disqualification, after JoJo slapped the referee. Hendrix defeated JoJo on November 12, at OVW's Saturday Night Special, to win the OVW Women's Championship for the first time, winning her first championship, and in a rematch on December 7. Throughout her reign as champion, Hendrix retained the championship several times against competitors such as Bobbie Bardot, C.J. Lane, Epiphany and Taryn Shay. On March 24, 2012, at OVW Episode 657, after retaining her title against The Great Cheyenne, Hendrix started a relationship with Dylan Bostic and afterwards became his valet.

On April 14 at OVW episode 660, Hendrix turned heel, after joining Josette Bynum's alliance. In mid–April, Hendrix started a feud with Epiphany and defeated her in a title match on April 28. On June 2, at OVW's Saturday Night Special, Hendrix dropped the Women's Title to Epiphany, ending her reign at 203 days. On July 7, at OVW's Saturday Night Special, Hendrix defeated Epiphany in an evening gown match to win the vacant Women's Championship for a second time. Hendrix lost the championship to Heidi Lovelace on September 15 during a live event in Elizabethtown, Kentucky. The following weeks, Hendrix started a rivalry with Josette Bynum, formerly known as Lady JoJo, once again after Bynum pinned Lovelace in a non–title match earning a future championship match. The two divas teamed up in a tag team match against The Blossom Twins on the October 18 edition of episode 687, but lost the match because of miscommunication. On July 7, Hendrix won the OVW Women's Championship for a second time, defeating Epiphany but lost it in September. On December 1, at OVW's Saturday Night Special, Hendrix defeated Taryn to win the OVW Women's Championship for a third time. Hendrix dropped the Women's Championship to Jessie Belle at OVW's Saturday Night Special on January 5, 2013, despite the interference from her on-screen boyfriend Dylan Bostic.

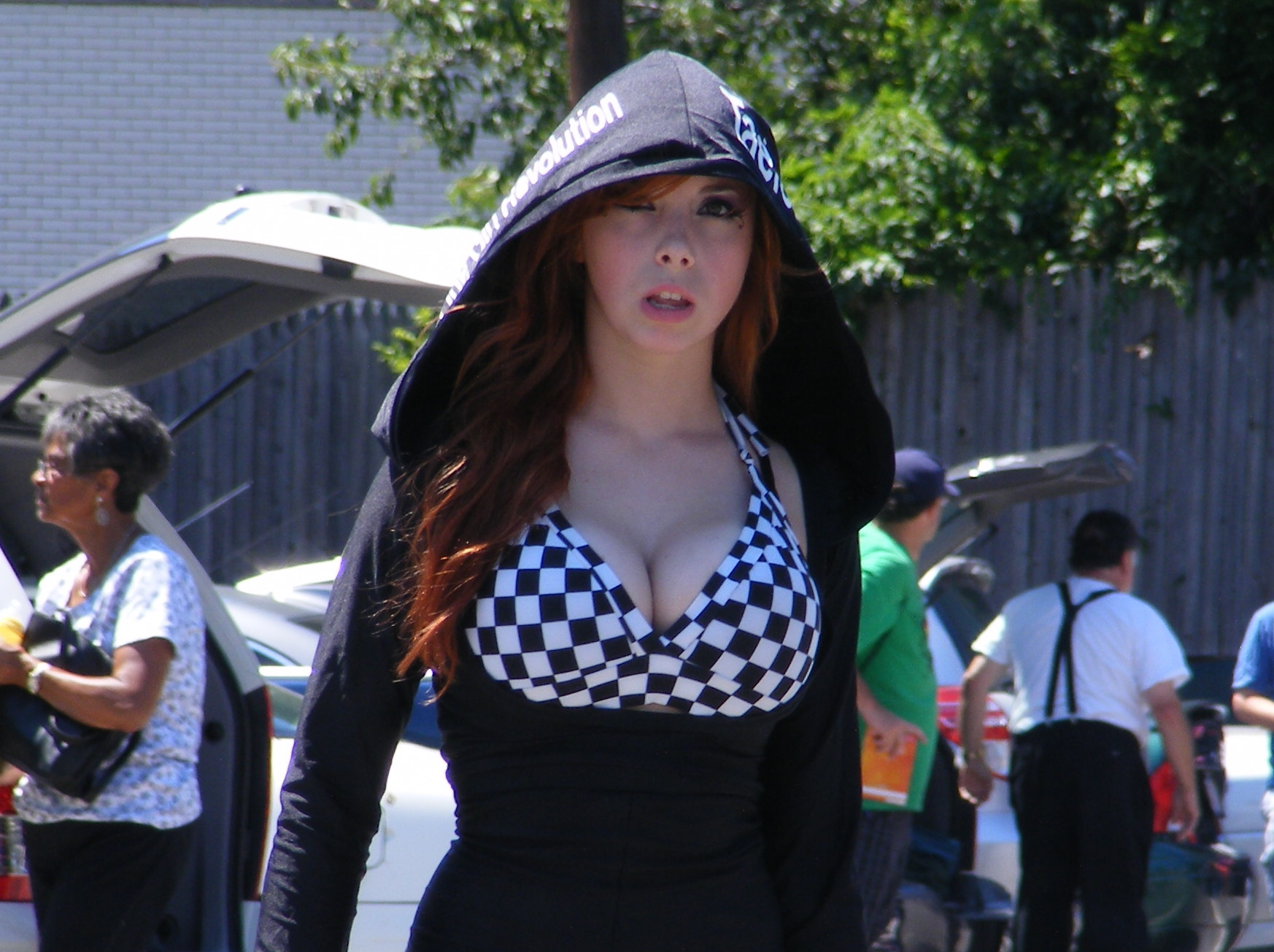
Hendrix in 2011

Hendrix got her rematch clause at OVW's Saturday Night Special during a triple threat match against Bynum and Lovelace, but lost the match after Heidi Lovelace pinned her to retain. On the November 8 edition of OVW episode 690, Hendrix interrupted Taryn Terrell during an interview and provoked her, only to get attacked for her troubles. On the November 17 edition of OVW episode 691, Hendrix served as the special guest referee for Women's Championship match, helping Taryn Terrell to defeat Lovelace. During the match, Hendrix would refuse to let Lovelace beat Terrell; making slow counts, stopping Lovelace from hurting Terrell and giving Terrell a fast count. On the November 24 edition of OVW episode 692, Hendrix defeated Lovelace in a dark match. Later that night, Hendrix would pour animal feces all over Taryn Terrell. On the November 28 edition of OVW episode 693, Terrell attacked Hendrix during an in-ring segment trying to get revenge for the previous week but was stopped by Bostic, but then Terrell would get in a backstage brawl with Hendrix On December 1, at OVW's Saturday Night Special, Taeler defeated Taryn to win the OVW Women's Championship for a third time in a poop in the pool match. After the match, Hendrix tried to attack Taryn, but she gained a measure of revenge when she moved out the way and Hendrix fell in. On the December 12 edition of OVW episode 695, Hendrix defeated Tarrell in a non-title match.

Hendrix was then placed in a rivalry with Jessie Belle after she defeated Heidi Lovelace to become the #1 Contender. On the December 12 edition of OVW Episode 695, Hendrix made her first title defense against Lovelace, which she successfully retained. On the January 3 edition of OVW episode 697, Hendrix attempted to persuade Epiphany and Jessie to focus on each other but was never less they both attacked Hendrix. Hendrix dropped the Women's Championship to Jessie Belle at OVW's Saturday Night Special on January 5, 2013, despite the interference from Bostic. Hendrix got her rematch for the championship on the January 19 edition of OVW episode 700, but was unsuccessful in regaining the belt despite the prematch attack plus interference from Bostic. On the January 26 edition of OVW episode 701, Hendrix failed to become number one contender to the OVW Women's Championship after losing to Epiphany. Over the next couple of weeks, Hendrix would defeat Heidi Lovelace and the debuting Lovely Lylah in singles matches.

==== Singles competition (2013) ====
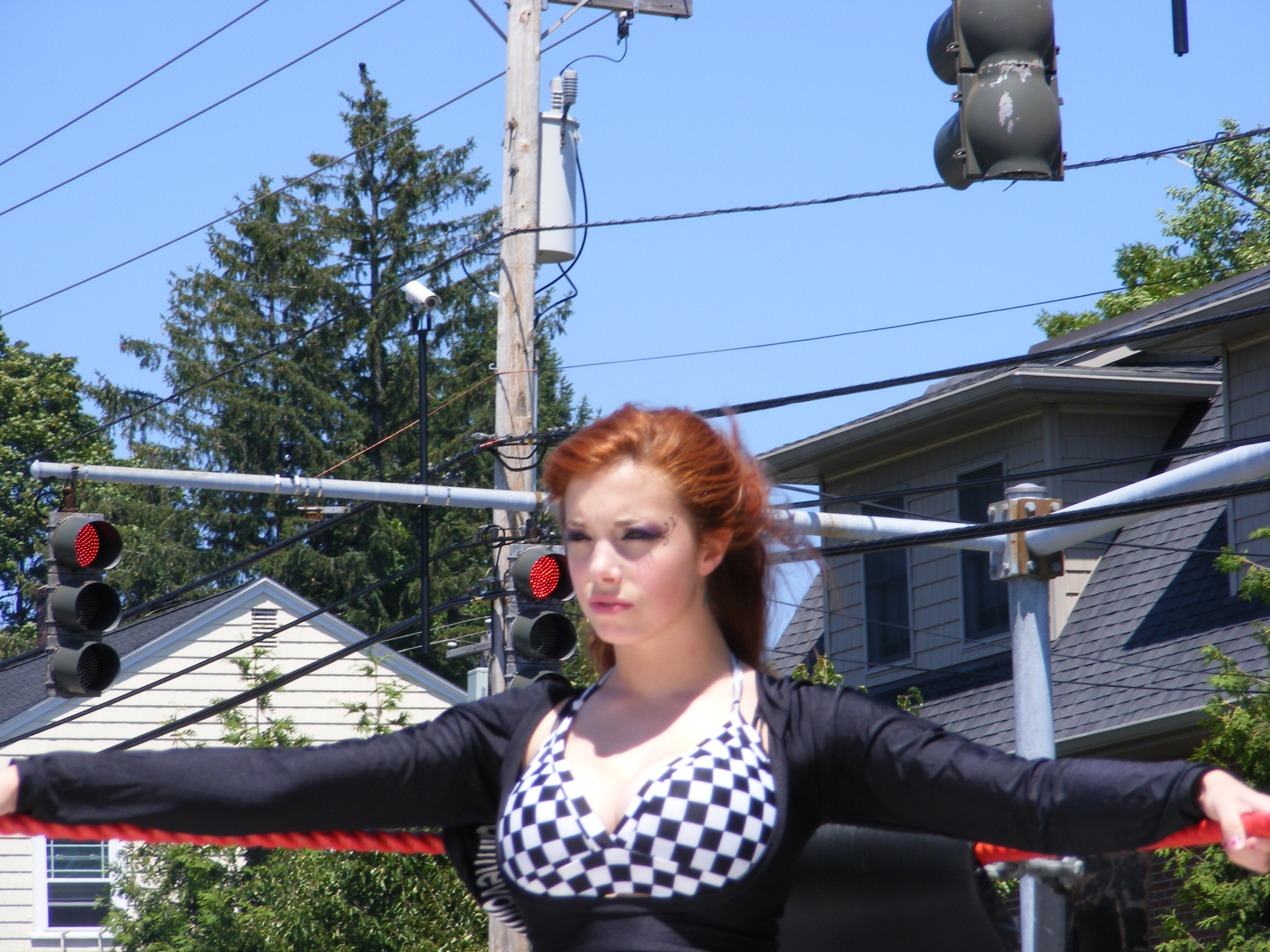
Hendrix in 2011

Over the next several weeks, Hendrix would receive gifts from a secret admirer whom she thought to be Ryan Howe which Hendrix boyfriend Dylan Bostic would ultimately become furious. On the March 23 edition of OVW Episode 709, Hendrix teamed up with Bostic against Heidi Lovelace and Ryan Howe in an intergender tag-team match which would end in a no-contest due to the implosion of Bostic and Howe. The following week on the March 30 edition of OVW Episode 710, Hendrix would come to ringside to watch Howe's OVW Television Championship match against Rockstar Spud. As the match went on, Bostic and Lovelace would come to ringside to confront Hendrix to the point Hendrix accidentally cost Howe's match via count-out. On the April 6 edition of OVW Episode 711, Taeler Hendrix unsuccessfully challenged Epiphany for the OVW Women's Championship. During the match, Bostic would eventually help Hendrix by pulling down Epiphany but was stopped by Eddie Diamond. The conclusion of that story ended on the April 27 episode of OVW when Heidi announced that it was her sending the gifts to Hendrix because she cares about her. On the May 4 episode of OVW Episode 715, Lovelace called out Hendrix to set the record straight to Hendrix about last week's revelation where she revealed that she was the secret admirer that sent gifts to Hendrix for weeks, Lovelace tried to express her feeling but was left alone by a confused Hendrix. On the May 9 edition of OVW Episode 716, Hendrix verified that it was Heidi who sent her the gifts, that Dylan Bostic doesn't care about her, and that Ryan Howe didn't send her the gifts either, Bostic interrupted Hendrix while giving her answer. Bostic then provoked Hendrix, only to get punched for her troubles Bostic would then try to attack Hendrix but Howe would come out and chase Bostic to the back signaling that Hendrix's relationship with Bostic ended. Later that episode, Hendrix defeated Holly Blossom after performing a roll-up with a handful of tights. On the May 23 episode of OVW Episode 718, Lovelace came out during Hendrix's match with Holly Blossom, and demanded an answer. Hendrix then grabbed Lovelace gently by the hand, walking out of the ring together, leading to a countout victory for Blossom.

On the June 8 edition of OVW Episode 720, Hendrix and St. John attacked Trina during a match with Lovelace. In their respective separate dark matches, Hendrix and St. John helped each other to defeat Jessie Belle and Epiphany. Hendrix and Lovelace would show tension for the first time on the June 14 edition of OVW Episode 720, after using her as a human shield during a non-title match where she defeated Trina. On the July 3 edition of OVW episode 724, Hendrix was backstage segment with Nikki St. John, talking about having Lovelace wrapped around her finger and having her do all the dirty work so that she can become a 4-time OVW Women's Champion, Lovelace overheard which would set up a tag-team match at the Saturday Night Special. At the Saturday Night Special, Hendrix teamed up with Nikki St. John in a losing effort to Lovelace and Trina despite the pre-match attack after Heidi pinned Hendrix with a roll up.

Hendrix aligned herself with the debuting Envy in a backstage segment on the July 17 edition of OVW episode 726, under the characters of "Mean Girls", whom are vain and narcissistic prima donnas. Later that event, Hendrix would team up with the Envy and Lovely Lylah in a losing effort to the team of Lovelace and The Blossom Twins after Lylah was pinned by Lovelace. Hendrix and Envy would attack Lylah and draw the letter "L" over her forehead which stands for "loser". On the November 16 edition of OVW episode 743, Hendrix received a Women's Championship match against Lei'D Tapa, but was unsuccessful in capturing the belt. This would be Hendrix's last appearance on OVW as she would not make any other appearance in the promotion.

=== Absolute Intense Wrestling (2012) ===
Hendrix made her debut for Absolute Intense Wrestling on April 15, 2012, in Cleveland, Ohio, where she competed against Annie Social who was accompanied by Sammy Geodollno in a winning effort. Hendrix made her debut for SHINE Wrestling on August 28, 2012, in Ybor City, Florida where she competed against Heidi Lovelace and Sojournor Bolt in a triple-treat match which the match was won by Bolt.

=== Total Nonstop Action Wrestling (2012–2013) ===
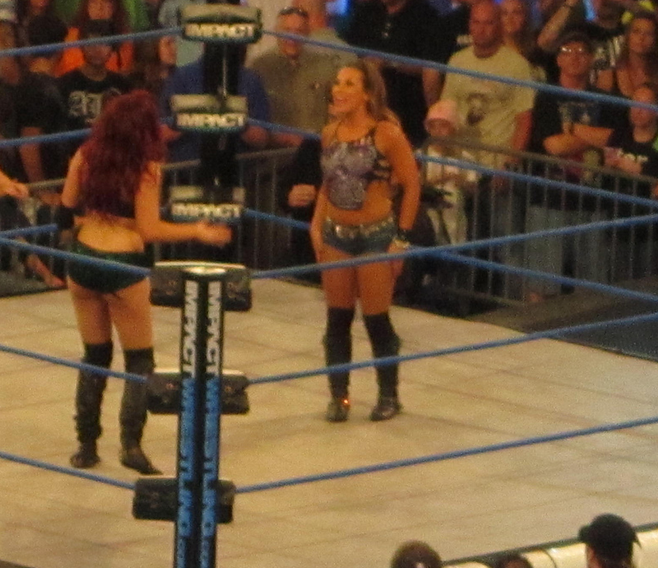
Hendrix facing off against Mickie James in 2013

On the June 21, 2012, episode of Total Nonstop Action Wrestling's Impact Wrestling television program, Hendrix took part in the Gut Check Challenge in an attempt to get a contract with the promotion, facing Tara in a losing effort. The following week, the storyline Gut Check Challenge judges decided to sign Hendrix to a contract, based on her performance. In actuality, Hendrix was signed to a developmental contract and assigned back to OVW. Hendrix returned to TNA on the November 22 edition of Impact Wrestling, where she competed against then TNA Knockouts Champion Tara, in a losing effort. Hendrix returned to TNA at the TNA One Night Only pay-per view special Knockouts Knockdown on March 17, where she competed against Hannah Blossom and Sojournor Bolt in a triple-treat match which was won by Blossom the event aired September 6, 2013.

Hendrix returned to television on the June 6, 2013 edition of Impact Wrestling, where she competed in a losing effort against TNA Women's Knockout Champion Mickie James. On July 3, Hendrix was released from her contract. Hendrix later revealed that she was unhappy with the opportunities that TNA gave her. She also revealed that she thought about not re-signing with the company, but was released before she decided.

=== Ring of Honor (2010, 2015–2017) ===
On July 16, 2010, at Ring of Honor, Hendrix made an appearance in a losing effort to Daizee Haze. On the next day, July 17, she competed against Sara Del Rey in a losing effort.

On September 25, 2015, Hendrix made her first ROH appearance in five years in a victory over Mandy Leon, immediately establishing herself as a heel by coming out with manager Truth Martini. Later that night, she came out with Martini and Martini's stable The House of Truth (Jay Lethal, Donovan Dijak, and J Diesel) for their six-man tag match against War Machine (Hanson & Rowe) and Moose, making her a full-fledged member of The House of Truth. The House of Truth would lose the match. On September 29, Hendrix confirmed on her official Facebook page that she signed a contract with ROH and was now on the Women of Honor roster.

On February 6, 2016, Hendrix wrestled her first TV match for Ring Of Honor. In a losing effort to Kelly Klein in the main event at ROH on SBG #249 - Women of Honor Special. On April 4, 2017, Hendrix announced her departure from Ring Of Honor.

=== Queens of Combat (2014–2018) ===
Hendrix debuted for the Queens of Combat promotion at their inaugural event on March 21, 2014, and defeated the villainous Serena Deeb in the main event. At Queens of Combat 2, Hendrix teamed with Sassy Stephie in a losing effort to The Killer Death Machines. At Queens of Combat 4, Hendrix was defeated by Sassy Stephie in a four-way match that also included Leva Bates and Su Yung.

Hendrix entered the Queens of Combat Title Tournament at Queens of Combat 5 and defeated Amy Love in the first round on June 13, 2015. On the next night, Hendrix defeated Amanda Rodriguez in the second round at QOC6, while also becoming a villainess by openly flirting with and taunting Rodriguez's boyfriend, Caleb Konley. At Queens of Combat 7 on November 29, 2015, Hendrix defeated Candice LeRae in the semifinals of the Title Tournament, and later defeated Tessa Blanchard in the finals to become the first-ever Queens of Combat Champion. At Queens of Combat 8 on March 18, 2016, Hendrix retained her Queens of Combat Championship against Allysin Kay. At Queens of Combat 9 on March 19, 2016, Hendrix lost to Tessa Blanchard in a Four Corners Match that also involved Crazy Mary Dobson and LuFisto. At Queens of Combat 10 on April 1, 2016, Hendrix retained her Queens of Combat Championship in a Three Way Match against Jessicka Havok and Tessa Blanchard.

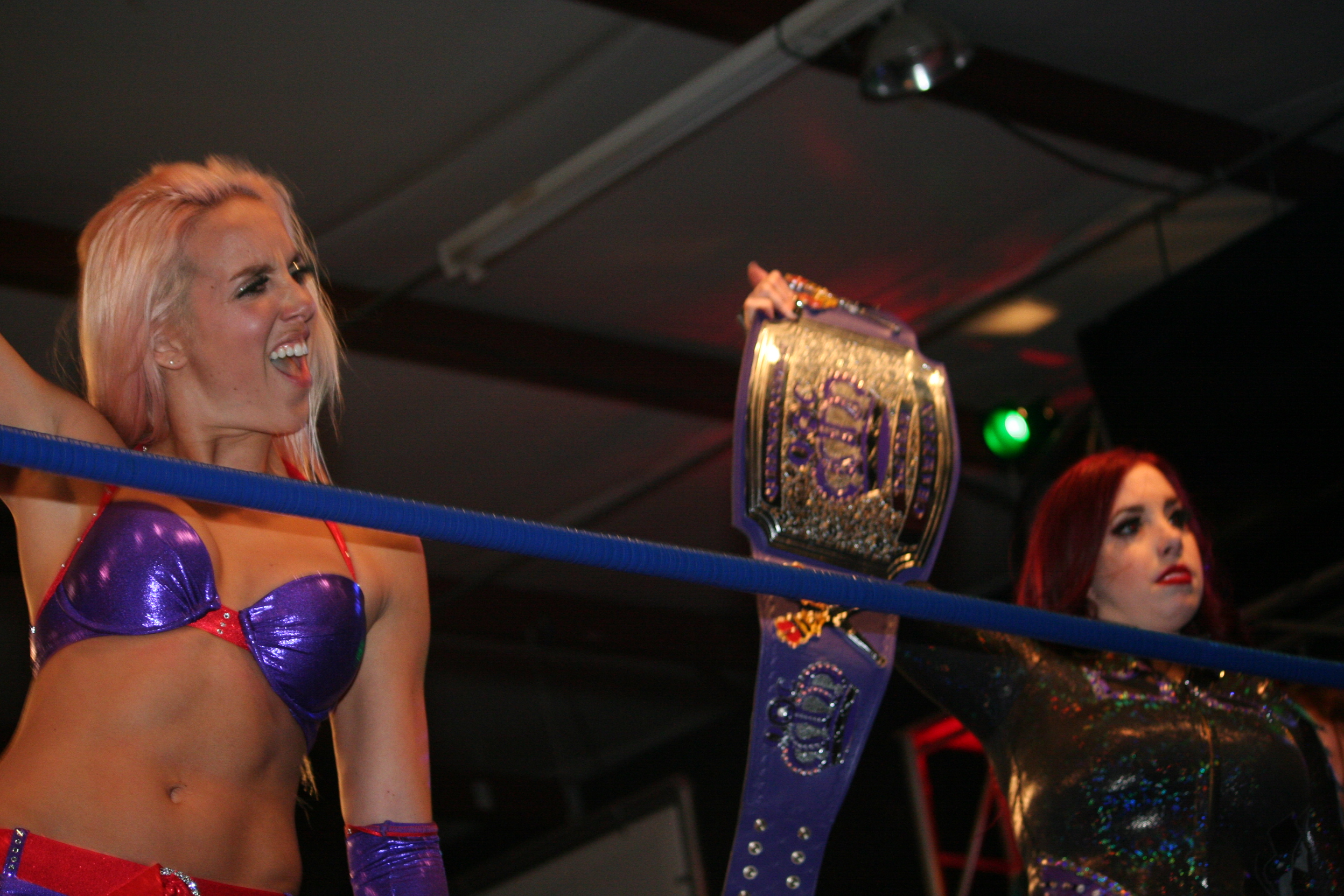
Hendrix (right) with Laurel Van Ness as the Queens of Combat Tag Team Champions

At Queens of Combat 11 on May 21, 2016, Hendrix retained her Queens of Combat Championship against Candice LeRae. On the same day, at Queens of Combat 12, Hendrix retains Her Queens of Combat Championship against Jessicka Havok. At Queens of Combat 13 on August 6, 2016, Hendrix retained her Queens of Combat Championship against Angelina Love. Hendrix lost her Queens of Combat Championship against Su Yung at Queens of Combat 16, on November 27, 2016, in Winston-Salem, North Carolina.

Queens of Combat 17 on February 18, 2017, saw the start of the QOC Tag Team Championship tournament to crown the first QOC Tag Team Champions. Hendrix teamed with Laurel Van Ness and defeated Aja Perera and Kiera Hogan in the first round. At Queens of Combat 18, also on February 18, they defeated Nevaeh and Rachael Ellering in the semi-finals. Hendrix and Van Ness defeated The Lucha Sisters (Leva Bates and Mia Yim) to become the first QOC Tag Team Champions Taeler's last match was a win in January 2018 at Queens of Combat #20 in a tag team match alongside Chelsea Green against Madi Maxx and Renee Michelle in which Hendrix & Green defended their Queens of Combat Tag team titles.

=== WWE (2014) ===
Hendrix appeared for the first time in WWE on the June 6, 2014 episode of SmackDown where she performed as one of Adam Rose's "rosebuds". Hendrix returned to work as a "rosebud" on the December 15 episode of Raw, and again the following night on a live edition of SmackDown.

=== Shimmer Women Athletes (2016) ===
On 7 September 2016, it was confirmed that Hendrix would make her debut at Shimmer Women Athletes at November 12, 2016. Hendrix made her debut at the taping of Volume 87, Successfully defeated ThunderKitty. On November 13, 2016, at the taping of Volume 89, Hendrix lost in a rematch to Thunderkitty.

=== WWR (2016-2018) ===
On April 10, 2016, Hendrix made her WWR debut during the WWR's Project XX event, winning against Barbi Hayden. She later fought & won against Sonya Strong on July 31, 2016, during the WWR Revolutionary event & achieved another victory against Rachael Ellering on May 20, 2017, during the WWR Brick House event. Hendrix's final match with WWR was during the WWR Facelift event on August 26, 2018, where she lost to Skylar.

=== Lucha Patron ===
Hendrix has also performed with wrestling group Lucha Patron, returning on June 17, 2023, at the group's Mas Lucha Libre event and winning a title defence match against Santana Garrett 5 years after her previous appearance in WWR's Facelift event on August 26, 2018.

== Personal life ==
Conrad-Mellen cites Lisa Marie Varon (Victoria/Tara), Sensational Sherri, and Velvet McIntyre as her favorite female wrestlers. Her favorite male wrestlers are Chris Sabin and Chris Jericho. Her favorite sports are bowling, Tae Kwon Do, volleyball, softball, swimming, and running. Her motto is "Attempt The Impossible In Order To Improve Your Work...".

== Writing career ==
On October 31, 2024, Hendrix released her debut novel, Behind These Whispering Walls.

== Championships and accomplishments ==
- National Pro Wrestling League
  - NPWL Women's Championship (1 time, inaugural)
  - NPWL Women's Championship Tournament (2017)
- Ohio Valley Wrestling
  - OVW Women's Championship (3 times)
  - Miss OVW (2012)
- Pro Wrestling Illustrated
  - Ranked No. 34 of the top 50 female wrestlers in the PWI Female 50 in 2013
- Queens of Combat
  - QOC Championship (1 time, inaugural)
  - QOC Championship Tournament (2015)
  - QOC Tag Team Championship (1 time, inaugural) – with Laurel Van Ness
  - QOC Tag Team Championship Tournament (2017) – with Laurel Van Ness
- Total Nonstop Action Wrestling
  - TNA Gut Check winner
