= Evolve: Succession III =

2026 WWE and Tubi special event

- Evolve Succession III logo
- Promotion: WWE
- Brand: Evolve
- Date: May 29, 2026 (aired June 24, 2026)
- City: Orlando, Florida
- Venue: WWE Performance Center

Evolve special episodes chronology
← Previous; Evolve: Succession II	Next → Evolve: ID Showcase Special

Evolve: Succession III was a 2026 professional wrestling television special produced by WWE. It was taped on May 29, 2026, at the WWE Performance Center in Orlando, Florida, and aired on tape delay on Tubi and YouTube on June 24, 2026. It featured wrestlers from the promotion's Evolve brand division.

Three matches were contested at the event. In the main event, Aaron Rourke defeated Max Abrams to retain the Evolve Men's Championship.

== Production ==
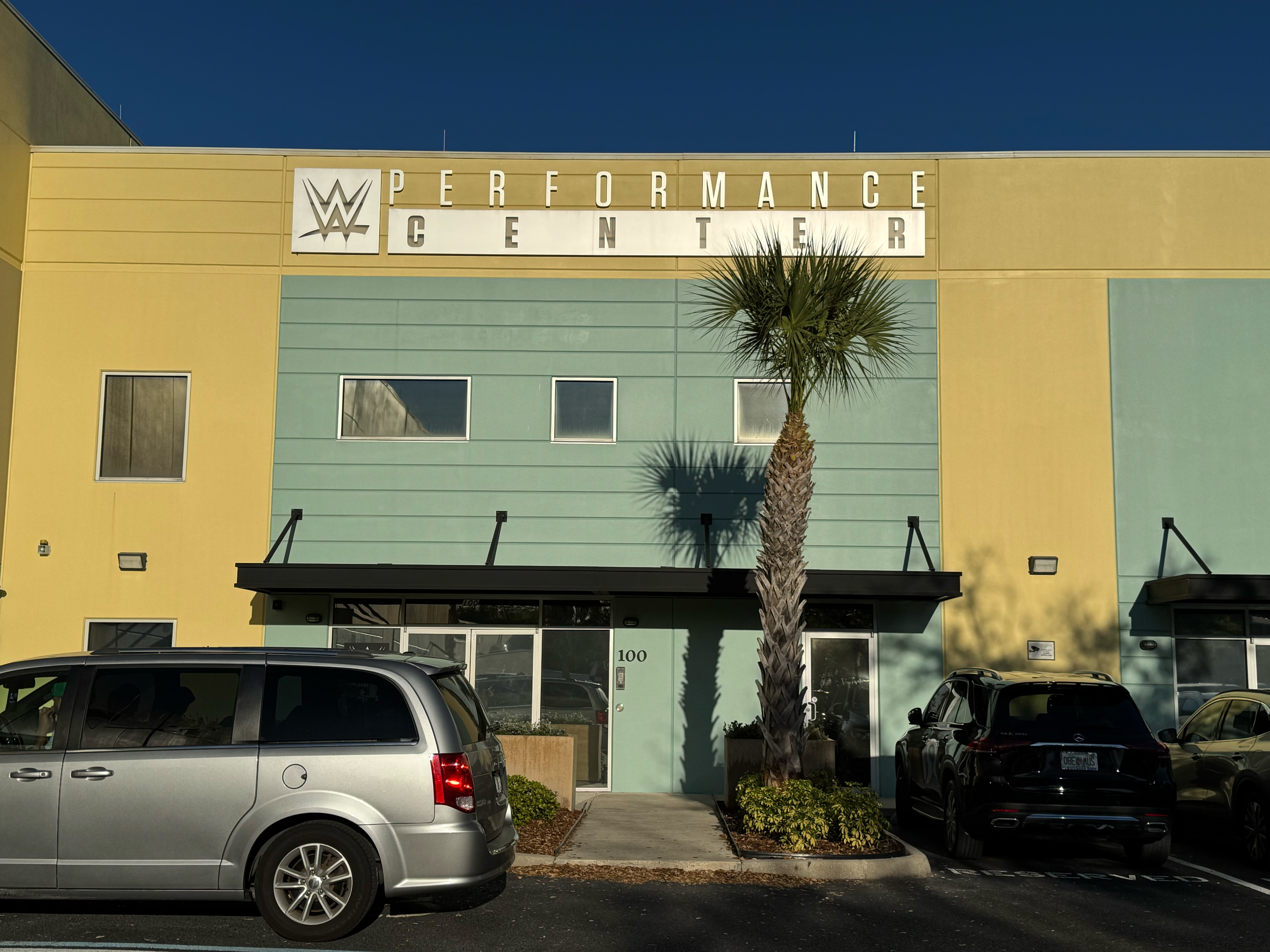
Succession III was taped at the WWE Performance Center in Orlando, Florida.

=== Background ===
During the May 27, 2026 episode of Evolve, the show's Foreman, Timothy Thatcher, announced that a special event named Evolve: Succession III would be held on June 24, and that it would feature contests for the division's two titles: the WWE Evolve Men's Championship and WWE Evolve Women's Championship. On the June 3 episode, Thatcher announced that new talent recruited through the WWE ID program would be unveiled at Succession III.

=== Broadcast outlets ===
In the United States, it was made available through ad-supported streaming television service Tubi, which exclusively owns the rights to air Evolve, while in international markets it was made available on YouTube.

=== Storylines ===
The event included matches that resulted from scripted storylines. Results were predetermined by WWE's writers on the Evolve brand, while storylines were produced on WWE's weekly television program Evolve. Unlike WWE's other wrestling television programs, episodes of Evolve air with a broadcast delay of several weeks. Dates referenced in this section are the given episode's air date.

On March 11, the reigning Evolve Women's Champion, Kendal Grey, vacated the title due to moving to the NXT division. On April 15, an eight-woman gauntlet match was held to award the championship. The match came down to Nikkita Lyons against Wendy Choo, with the latter getting the final pin to win the title. On April 22, Choo announced that she had been permitted to choose her first title defence, and chose Laynie Luck. Lyons interrupted to demand the title shot instead, then attacked Choo with the aid of Sloane Jacobs. On May 6, Choo and Luck's title match ended in a no contest when Lyons and Jacobs invaded the ring and attacked both wrestlers. On May 27, Lyons and Jacobs won a tag team match against Choo and Luck, with Jacobs pinning Choo and earning a title match for the following week. On June 3, Timothy Thatcher announced that Lyons would get to challenge for the title at Succession III. Later that night, Choo defeated Jacobs to retain the title.

On April 29, Thatcher hired a pair of (kayfabe) security guards who made multiple appearances over the ensuing weeks, preventing unsanctioned fights or interference in matches, often using excessive force. On June 3, the duo's names were revealed as Viktor Zanov and Shido Ash.

On May 27, Aaron Rourke successfully defended his Evolve Men's Championship against Tristan Angels. After the match, the Mog Squad came out, with their leader Max Abrams declaring his goal to gain the title. The Mog Squad swarmed the ring and beat down Rourke until he was saved by the intervention of Cappuccino Jones, Marcus Mathers and Sam Holloway. On June 3, Abrams defeated Jones in a singles match with the aid of interference from his Mog Squad teammate CJ Valor. On June 10, Jones, Holloway and Mathers were scheduled to face the Mog Squad's Abrams, Santi Rivera and Jacari Ball in a six-man tag team match. However, the Mog Squad attacked Jones backstage, causing Rourke to take his place in the match. Abrams pinned Mathers with the aid of interference from Valor. Afterwards, it was announced that Abrams would face Rourke for the title at Succession III. On June 17, a vignette showed a verbal confrontation between the two. Abrams explained that he had plotted to gain the title ever since Rourke won it, being motivated by having been snubbed in Sean Legacy's farewell speech to Evolve on February 25, and by a sense of superiority over Rourke, Jones, Holloway and Mathers for them having been in Evolve longer than the Mog Squad, yet not getting promoted to NXT.

Also on May 27, Braxton Cole had a match against Harlem Lewis. Cole was disqualified for using a metal chair to inflict a (kayfabe) shoulder injury on Lewis. On June 10, a vignette showed Cole mocking Lewis for the injury and saying that he was only fit to work as a janitor. On June 17, Lewis challenged Cole to a no-disqualification match. On the same episode, actor and comedian KevOnStage visited Evolve and was appointed by Timothy Thatcher as the guest general manager for July 1. KevOnStage declared that Lewis would face Cole on that date.

On June 10, It's Gal held an open challenge, which was answered by DarkState's Cutler James in his Evolve debut. James defeated Gal, and vowed to "dominate every brand in WWE".

== Event ==
Other on-screen personnel
Role:	Name:
English commentators	Blake Howard
English commentators	Peter Rosenberg
Ring announcer	Mike Rome
Referees	Victoria D'Errico
Referees	Chip Danning
Referees	Jeremy Marcus
Interviewer	Chuey Martinez

=== Preliminary matches ===
In the opening match, Wendy Choo defended the Evolve Women's Championship against Nikkita Lyons. Lyons was accompanied by Sloane Jacobs, who carried a large crystal to "draw power from". The match was initially even, with several near-falls for each side. A turning point came when Choo locked in her Dirt Nap submission hold on Lyons, to which Lyons managed to roll them both outside the ring and slam Choo into the metal stairs. Lyons then climbed to the second rope and performed a jumping scoop slam. Choo escaped the subsequent pinfall attempt and hit Lyons with a powerbomb, then locked in the Dirt Nap again. Jacobs placed the title belt on the ring apron. Lyons tapped out, but Jacobs distracted the referee to not see it. Choo released the hold, unaware that the match was still going. Laynie Luck ran out to attack Jacobs, who left the crystal in the corner of the ring. Lyons grabbed the title belt and swung it at Choo, who dodged and countered into a roll-up pin attempt, but Lyons escaped and dropped the belt. While the referee was taking away the belt, Lyons struck Choo in the head with the crystal. Lyons then hit a roundhouse kick and pinned Choo to become the new Evolve Women's Champion.

An interview between Chuey Martinez and KevOnStage was interrupted by It's Gal, who offered to mentor KevOnStage. The latter was annoyed and declared that Gal would rematch Cutler James on July 1.

The second match saw NXT wrestler Kale Dixon make his Evolve debut against Kai Kavari. Dixon dominated the early part of the match, but Kavari gained the upper hand by dodging a clothesline and then hitting a sequence of a springboard back elbow, clothesline, running trip, running shove, escaping a lift, and then a dropkick. Kavari became distracted by an unnamed woman who appeared at ringside. Dixon landed a discus punch to get the pinfall victory. The woman applauded.

A vignette depicted a different, Russian-speaking woman calling herself "The Unknown" and declaring that she would appear on Evolve soon.

The Mog Squad (Max Abrams, CJ Valor, Jacari Ball and Santi Rivera) entered the ring and began mocking KevOnStage, who retaliated by declaring that Valor, Ball and Rivera would face Marcus Mathers, Cappuccino Jones and Sam Holloway in a six-man elimination match on July 1.

=== Main event ===
In the main event, Aaron Rourke defended the Evolve Men's Championship against Max Abrams (accompanied by Valor, Ball and Rivera). Rourke quickly began skirmishing with all four of the Mog Squad, and took a hard trip onto the apron. During the match, Chuey Martinez spoke with Harlem Lewis in the audience, who declared that after defeating Braxton Cole, he would pursue the Men's Championship. Rourke and Abrams traded heavy blows until Rourke accidentally knocked down the referee with a kick. Rourke then knocked down Abrams with another kick, and pinned him, but the referee could not do the count. The other members of the Mog Squad entered the ring and surrounded Rourke. Harlem Lewis came to Rourke's aid, but Braxton Cole ran in and attacked Lewis. Valor hit Rourke with the title belt. The referee got back up and Abrams made a pin attempt, but Rourke escaped. The referee then collapsed again and the Mog Squad re-entered the ring, but Cappuccino Jones, Sam Holloway and Marcus Mathers ran in to fight them off. The referee got back up again. Abrams kicked Rourke in the head, then placed him on the top turnbuckle, but Rourke gained control and threw Abrams off into a gourdbuster. Rourke then performed a Molly-Go-Round and pinned Abrams to retain the title.

After the match, Jones and Mathers nearly fought with Ball and Rivera, but the security guards (Viktor Zanov and Shido Ash) interfered and beat up all four.

== Aftermath ==
On the July 1 episode of Evolve, Cutler James defeated It's Gal; the Mog Squad's Jacari Ball, Santi Rivera and CJ Valor defeated the team of Cappuccino Jones, Marcus Mathers and Sam Holloway in an elimination tag match; and Harlem Lewis defeated Braxton Cole in a no-disqualification match. After the latter event, Aaron Rourke came out to thank Lewis for his aid at Succession III, and accepted the challenge for a title match. On July 15, Lewis defeated Rourke to obtain the Men's Championship.

Kale Dixon gave an interview in which he confirmed that the woman who appeared at ringside the previous week was his "business partner", without revealing her name. Timothy Thatcher fired Viktor Zanov and Shido Ash for insubordination, to which they demanded to become wrestlers, and when Thatcher refused, the pair declared that they "can do what we want, whatever we want." The pair made their in-ring debut on the July 22 episode with a win over Marcus Mathers and Cappuccino Jones.

On the July 8 episode of Evolve, Nikkita Lyons held a party for her title victory, which was interrupted by an attack from Laynie Luck, Wren Sinclair, Layla Diggs and Skylar Rae. On the July 22 episode, Lyons defeated Luck to retain the title. Lyons and Jacobs then began a feud with Sinclair and Thea Hail which will lead to a title match on the August 19 episode.

== Results ==
No.	Results	Stipulations	Times
1	Nikkita Lyons (with Sloane Jacobs) defeated Wendy Choo (c) by pinfall	Singles match for the Evolve Women's Championship	10:45
2	Kale Dixon defeated Kai Kavari by pinfall	Singles match	3:37
3	Aaron Rourke (c) defeated Max Abrams (with CJ Valor, Santi Rivera, and Jacari Ball) by pinfall	Singles match for the Evolve Men's Championship	13:09
(c) / – the champion(s) heading into the match
