= WWNLive x HOC ID Showcase: Battle of Champions =

2026 WWE ID, House of Champions, and WWNLive event

- Promotion(s): WWE (WWE ID); WWNLive; House of Champions
- Date: January 10, 2026
- City: Longwood, Florida
- Venue: House of Champions Pro Wrestling Training Center

WWE ID event chronology
| ← Previous; GCW ID Showcase | Next → FSW ID Showcase |

WWNLive x HOC ID Showcase: Battle of Champions was a professional wrestling livestreaming event produced by WWNLive and House of Champions in association with WWE's Independent Development program. The show took place on January 10, 2026 at the House of Champions Pro Wrestling Training Center in Longwood, Florida and was streamed live on YouTube.

== Production ==
=== Background ===
In October 2024, the American professional wrestling company WWE introduced the Independent Development (ID) program, similar to their Next in Line (NIL) program for college athletes, with ID to support the development of independent wrestlers by collaborating with various wrestling schools and promotions on the independent circuit. The inaugural partner promotions and schools confirmed were Reality of Wrestling, Black and Brave Academy, Nightmare Factory, Elite Pro Wrestling Training Center, and KnokX Pro Academy.

During a press conference on February 18, 2025, WWE's Chief Content Officer, Paul "Triple H" Levesque, unveiled men's and women's WWE ID Championships. The titles were designed to be defended exclusively across the independent circuit, offering emerging talent increased exposure and opportunities. The inaugural champions were determined through a tournament featuring top prospects from the WWE ID program. The tournament matches were scheduled to take place at various independent wrestling shows, highlighting WWE's collaboration with the independent wrestling scene. Participants of the inaugural tournament were all WWE ID prospects, and first round matches were held by Game Changer Wrestling (GCW) on April 16 and Future Stars of Wrestling on April 18 during WrestleMania 41 week. It was then confirmed that after the crowning of the inaugural champions, all independent wrestlers would be eligible to challenge for the ID Championships and that if a non-WWE ID wrestler were to win either title, they would receive a WWE ID contract.

=== Storylines ===
WWNLive x HOC ID Showcase: Battle of Champions featured professional wrestling matches that involves different wrestlers from pre-existing scripted feuds and storylines. Wrestlers portrayed villains, heroes, or less distinguishable characters in scripted events that built tension and culminated in a wrestling match or series of matches. Storylines were produced on WWE Evolve, WWNLive events and their weekly show WWN Proving Ground, and various events on the independent circuit.

== Results ==
Other on-screen personnel
| Role: | Name: |
|---|---|
| Commentators | Simon Sez |
| Commentators | Trevin Adams |

| No. | Results | Stipulations | Times |
|---|---|---|---|
| 1 | It's GAL defeated Sean Legacy | Singles match | 6:36 |
| 2 | Jamie Stanley defeated Jake Powers and Papi D and Slade Porter | Four way match | 7:42 |
| 3 | Timothy Thatcher defeated Marcus Mathers | Singles match | 12:05 |
| 4 | Swipe Right (Brad Baylor and Ricky Smokes) (with Jackson Drake) defeated Jha'Quan McNair and Mike Cunningham | Tag team match | 11:26 |
| 5 | Laynie Luck (c) defeated Airica Demia | Singles match for the WWE Women's ID Chamipionship | 11:02 |
| 6 | Maxx Danziger (c) defeated GMJ | Singles match for the HOC Heavyweight Championship | 6:54 |
| 7 | Cappuccino Jones (c) defeated Aaron Rourke | Singles match for the WWE ID Championship | 16:51 |
| 8 | Jackson Drake (with Brad Baylor and Ricky Smokes) (c) defeated Jha'Quan McNair (with Mike Cunningham) by referee's decision | Singles match for the WWE Evolve Championship | 9:13 |
(c) / – the champion(s) heading into the match
