= Evolve: ID Showcase Special =

2026 WWE and Tubi special event

- Promotion: WWE
- Brand(s): Evolve; WWE ID
- Date: July 17, 2026 (aired September 9, 2026)
- City: Orlando, Florida
- Venue: WWE Performance Center

Evolve special episodes chronology
← Previous; Evolve: Succession III	Next → Evolve: Succession IV

ID Showcase chronology
← Previous; ROW ID Showcase	Next → —

Evolve: ID Showcase Special was a 2026 professional wrestling television special produced by WWE. It was taped on July 17, 2026, at the WWE Performance Center in Orlando, Florida, and aired on tape delay on Tubi and YouTube on September 9, 2026. It featured wrestlers from the promotion's Evolve brand division.

== Production ==
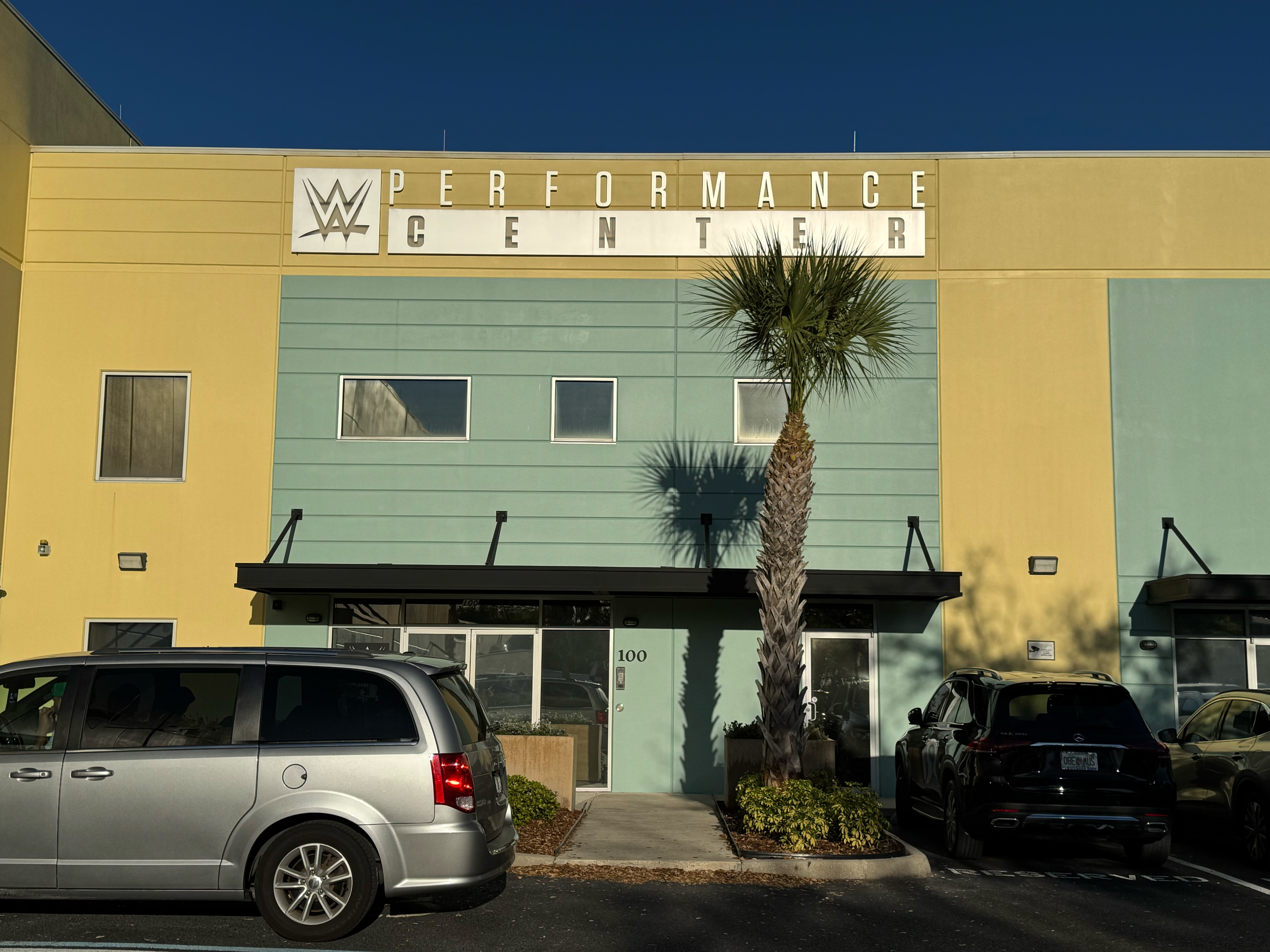
The ID Showcase Special was taped at the WWE Performance Center in Orlando, Florida.

=== Background ===
In June 2024, WWE trademarked WWE ID and WWE Independent Development with the purpose of organizing and conducting a program to help develop wrestlers. That October, WWE ID was officially announced, which would support the development of independent wrestlers at specified schools or promotions and provide them a pathway to the promotion. The first schools and promotions designated under WWE ID were Reality of Wrestling (run by Booker T), Black and Brave Academy (run by Seth Rollins and Marek Brave), Nightmare Factory (run by Cody Rhodes), Elite Pro Wrestling Training Center, and KnokX Pro Academy (run by Rikishi). On November 9, Fightful reported that Timothy Thatcher had been signed as the WWE ID trainer. In addition to Thatcher, it was later reported by Yahoo! Entertainment that Sean Waltman had been hired as an ID trainer.

On February 1, 2025, during the 2025 Royal Rumble, WWE announced the launch of WWE Evolve, a Tubi program based on the defunct independent Evolve promotion ran by WWE ID co-founder Gabe Sapolsky. The program, which premiered on March 5, 2025, features both WWE ID prospects and Performance Center trainees. On February 18, WWE chief content officer Paul "Triple H" Levesque announced the creation of the WWE ID Championship and Women's ID Championship – the championships are defended in WWE and on the independent circuit. On August 1, during SummerSlam weekend, independent wrestling promotion Game Changer Wrestling held their WWE ID Showcase event at The Williams Center in Rutherford, New Jersey, which saw Cappuccino Jones taking on Jack Cartwheel in the finals for the WWE ID Championship tournament and ID Champion and Kylie Rae taking on Zara Zakher and Zayda Steel in the finals for the WWE Women's ID Championship tournament. Beginning on June 8, 2025, various independent promotions held various ID Showcase events which showcased talent from the WWE ID program. Notable promotions that have held ID Showcase events include Future Stars of Wrestling (FSW), New York Wrestling Connection (NYWC), WWNLive, Game Changer Wrestling (GCW), Beyond Wrestling, the Nightmare Factory, and Reality of Wrestling (ROW).

=== Broadcast outlets ===
In the United States, it was made available through ad-supported streaming television service Tubi, which exclusively owns the rights to air Evolve, while in international markets it was made available on YouTube.

=== Storylines ===
The event included matches that resulted from scripted storylines. Results were predetermined by WWE's writers on the Evolve brand, while storylines were produced on WWE's weekly television program Evolve. Unlike WWE's other wrestling television programs, episodes of Evolve air with a broadcast delay of several weeks. Dates referenced in this section are the given episode's air date.

=== Event ===
Other on-screen personnel
Role:	Name:
Commentators	Blake Howard
Commentators	Robert Stone
Ring announcer	Sarah Schreiber
Referees	Felix Fernandez
Referees	Gary Wilson
Interviewer	Adriana Rizzo

== Results ==
No.	Results	Stipulations	Times
1	Anya Rune defeated Gianna Capri by pinfall	Singles match	3:56
2	WWE ID 1.0 (Aaron Rourke, Marcus Mathers, Sam Holloway, and It's GAL) defeated The Mog Squad (Max Abrams, CJ Valor, Santi Rivera, and Jacari Ball)	Team Gauntlet series eight-man tag team elimination match	21:16
