= Roxxi Laveaux =

American professional wrestler (born 1979)

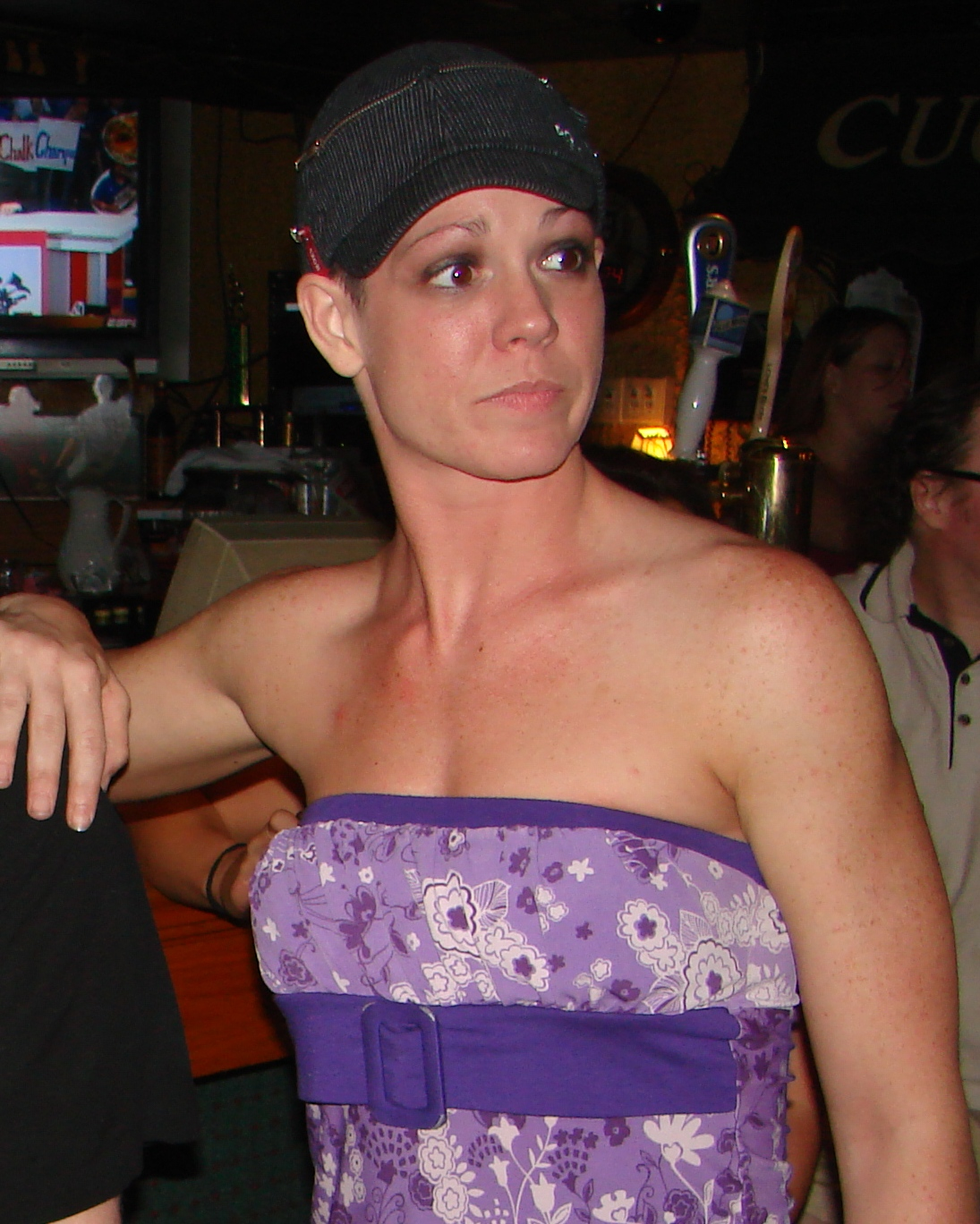

Personal information
- Born: Nicole Raczynski; April 19, 1979 (age 47) Boston, Massachusetts, U.S.

Professional wrestling career
- Ring name(s): The Midnight Diva; Nikki Corleone; Nikki Roxx; Roxxi; Roxxi Laveaux
- Billed height: 5 ft 9 in (1.75 m)
- Billed weight: 142 lb (64 kg; 10.1 st)
- Billed from: Boston, Massachusetts; Congo Square, Louisiana
- Trained by: Slyck Wagner Brown; Steve Bradley; Killer Kowalski
- Debut: 2002
- Retired: 2013

Nicole Raczynski (born April 19, 1979) is an American former professional wrestler. She is best known for her tenure in Total Nonstop Action Wrestling under the ring names Roxxi Laveaux, The Voodoo Queen, and Roxxi. She is also known for her time in Shimmer Women Athletes and various other independent promotions under the ring name Nikki Roxx.

== Professional wrestling career ==
=== Early career (2002–2005) ===
Growing up, Raczynski attended professional wrestling events at the Boston Garden with her parents. She trained as a wrestler under Killer Kowalski at the urging of April Hunter who was already training there. Raczynski was allowed to train at the school for free, according to her, because of Kowalski's "soft spot for the women that were trying to get into the business" (other women, such as Chyna, are known to have paid, possibly because one of Kowalski's own students urged her to train). She debuted in March 2002 under the ring name Nikki Roxx and later formed a tag team with Hunter called The Killer Babes. Raczynski wrestled in numerous North American independent promotions such as Shimmer Women Athletes, Squared Circle Wrestling, Women's Extreme Wrestling (WEW), Professional Girl Wrestling Association, New England Championship Wrestling, Defiant Pro Wrestling, MXW Pro Wrestling, World Women's Wrestling, Chaotic Wrestling and Ring of Honor (ROH). She has also wrestled in Mexico for promotions such as Consejo Mundial de Lucha Libre (CMLL), Lucha Libre Femenil and Lucha Libre AAA World Wide (AAA).

=== Shimmer Women Athletes (2005–2011) ===
On November 6, 2005, Raczynski made her Shimmer Women Athletes debut under the name Nikki Roxx at the promotion's first ever tapings. On Volume 1 she teamed up with Cindy Rogers in a losing effort against Krissy Vaine and Amber O'Neal and on Volume 2, taped that same night, she defeated Lexie Fyfe. She returned to the promotion on February 12, 2006, for the tapings of Volumes 3 and 4, during which she lost to Rain and defeated Amber O'Neal in singles matches. On May 21 at the tapings of Volume 5, she had a breakout performance in a losing effort against Amazing Kong. After a series of victories over Lorelei Lee, Lacey, Malia Hosaka and Tiana Ringer on the following four Volumes, Roxx had worked her way from opening matches to main eventing her first Shimmer event, Volume 10, which was taped on April 7, 2007. At the event Roxx was defeated by Sara Del Rey. In June Roxx took part in the tournament to determinate the first ever Shimmer Champion. She defeated Rain to advance to the second round, where she was defeated by Lacey. On Volume 12 she won a four corner survival match against Ariel, Portia Perez and Eden Black. In the main event of Volume 13 she teamed up with Sara Del Rey in a tag team match, where they defeated the Minnesota Home Wrecking Crew of Lacey and Rain. On July 1, 2007, at the tapings of Volume 14 Roxx had a rematch with Amazing Kong, but was once again defeated. This would mark Roxx's final Shimmer appearance in over a year, as after the event she signed a contract with Total Nonstop Action Wrestling and was forced to leave the promotion.

On July 5, 2008, at the tapings of Volume 19 Roxx made her return and defeated Nicole Matthews in a singles match. Later that same night on Volume 20, she was defeated by Ariel. At the October 19 tapings of Volumes 21 and 22 Roxx defeated Danyah and lost to Jetta. The next four Volumes were taped in May 2009, during which she defeated Cat Power and Melanie Cruise in singles matches and formed the tag team Pretty Bitchin' with Ariel and lost to The International Home Wrecking Crew (Rain and Jetta) and defeated The Experience (Lexi Fyfe and Malia Hosaka) in tag team matches. On November 8 at the tapings of Volume 27 Roxx competed in her biggest match in Shimmer Women Athletes, unsuccessfully challenging MsChif for the Shimmer Championship. On Volume 28, taped that same night, Roxx bounced back by defeating Wesna Busic. On April 10, 2010, at the tapings of Volume 29, Roxx and Ariel defeated the team of Melanie Cruise and Annie Social to earn a match for the Shimmer Tag Team Championship. On Volume 30, taped that same day, Roxx was defeated by Ayumi Kurihara in a singles match. The following day, on Volume 31, Roxx and Ariel received their shot at the Tag Team Championship, but were defeated by the defending champions, the Canadian NINJAs (Nicole Matthews and Portia Perez). Roxx and Ariel continued teaming together until October 2011, when they both left Shimmer.

=== Total Nonstop Action Wrestling (2007–2009) ===
==== Voodoo Kin Mafia ====
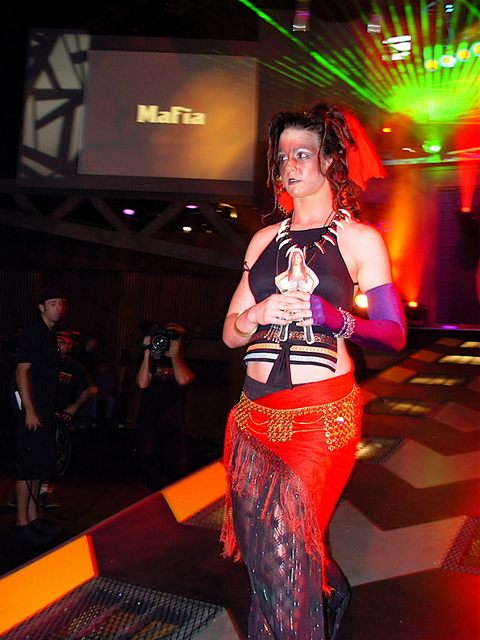
The "Voodoo Queen" Roxxi Laveaux at the TNA Impact! Zone.

According to an interview, thanks to a push made for her by Abyss (whom she met on a 2CW show in Syracuse, New York), Total Nonstop Action Wrestling contacted her and signed Raczynski to a contract in the summer of 2007. Raczynski debuted in TNA on July 15, 2007, at the Victory Road pay-per-view. Identified as "The Voodoo Queen" Roxxi Laveaux, she was introduced as the valet of the Voodoo Kin Mafia. Following a match between the Voodoo Kin Mafia and Basham and Damaja, Roxxi brawled with Christy Hemme, the valet of Basham and Damaja. On the September 27, 2007, episode of Impact!, Roxxi defeated Hemme, Gail Kim, Jackie Moore and Ms. Brooks in a Bound for Glory preview match to claim the 10th and final spot in the TNA Women's Championship Gauntlet. Roxxi made it to the final two, although Kim ultimately won to become the first TNA Women's Knockout Champion. On the following pay-per-view, Genesis, Roxxi competed in a four-way match between herself, Kim, ODB, and Angel Williams for the TNA Women's Championship. Roxxi had the advantage when she spit Asian mist into ODB's face, but Kim her took down long enough to pin ODB and retain her title.

Roxxi competed in a tag team match at Turning Point, teaming up with ODB to take on Angelina Love (Angel Williams) and Velvet Sky. However, Roxxi and ODB lost the match, with Roxxi being pinned after the double-team Russian legsweep from Sky and a big boot from Love. On the January 3, 2008, edition of Impact!, Roxxi participated in a Gauntlet match that would help determine the 2008 rankings of the TNA Knockouts division. She made it to the final two, facing off against ODB, but was pinned. She was fired from the Voodoo Kin Mafia by Kip James on the January 31, 2008, edition of Impact!, because she accidentally threw white powder in the eyes of Kip and cost him the match against Hernandez.

==== The Hardcore Knockout ====
On the March 6 edition of Impact! Roxxi was shown in a backstage promo with Angelina Love and Velvet Sky who insisted on giving her a makeover the next week, so they could make her into one of the "beautiful people". On the following episode of Impact!, Roxxi became a babyface when she resisted their attempts to change her, and in response the duo attacked her and called her a freak, sparking a feud between them. She defeated Love on the April 10, 2008, edition of Impact! by debuting her new finisher, the Voodoo Drop. She then went on to win the first-ever Queen of the Cage match at Lockdown, ultimately pinning Love after a Voodoo Drop, and as a result of winning, she was granted a Knockouts Title match. The title match occurred on the following Impact!, where she was pinned by then-champion Awesome Kong.

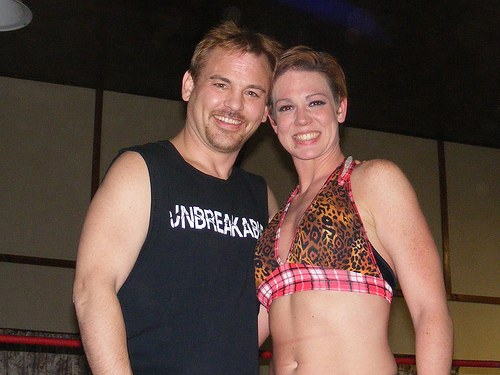
Roxxi with Spike Dudley at a Top Rope Promotions event.

On May 11, 2008, at Sacrifice, Roxxi competed in a TNA Knockout Makeover Battle Royal, a two part match where the first part was contested under normal battle royal rules. The last two women in the ring would then compete in a ladder match where the winner would become the new #1 contender while the loser would have to have her head shaved bald. Roxxi survived the battle royal part of the match, but was defeated in the ladder match by Gail Kim after Angelina Love and Velvet Sky interfered in the match (Kim had won an immunity match in a previous episode of Impact!, which meant that had Roxxi won the ladder match, Love would have been the one to have her head shaved). Roxxi was shaved bald on the spot with the other Knockouts watching. She received a standing ovation from the face Knockouts and fans after the shaving. On the following Impact!, the "Laveaux" portion of her name was dropped and she was now being billed as simply Roxxi. At Slammiversary, she teamed with ODB and Kim to defeat The Beautiful People and Moose in a Six Woman Tag Team match.

From August Roxxi began to phase into a new gimmick: that of a Hardcore Knockout as emphasized by a series of TNA Rough Cut segments. She later participated in several hardcore matches, often getting bloodied during them. She also developed a punk like attitude during interviews, often swearing excessively. On September 25, 2008, she disguised herself as Raisha Saeed, the manager of Awesome Kong, when Kong was facing Mercedes Steele. After the match, Roxxi removed her disguise and attacked Kong with a steel chair. Because of this stunt, she was granted a three-way dance match between herself, Taylor Wilde, and Awesome Kong at Bound for Glory IV for the Knockouts Championship, which Wilde won. Roxxi and Wilde attacked Kong and Saeed on the October 30 episode of Impact!, continuing their feud. At Turning Point, Roxxi and Wilde teamed up and defeated Kong and Saeed. Roxxi and Wilde teamed up again, this time with ODB, and defeated the Beautiful People and Sharmell at Final Resolution. Roxxi and Wilde eventually moved into a regular tag team and feud with the Beautiful People, even hiring a Sarah Palin impersonator to embarrass them. Her last match was at Destination X where she teamed with Wilde and the Governor to defeat the Beautiful People and Madison Rayne. On April 30, 2009, Roxxi was released from her TNA contract while serving a 60-day suspension following a backstage altercation with Rhaka Khan.

On August 29, 2009, Jeremy Borash announced that Raczynski would be returning to the company at the August 31 and September 1 Impact! tapings for an apparent one-shot deal. On the September 10 edition of Impact! she returned to team with Madison Rayne in the tournament for the Knockout Tag Team Championship. They were, however, eliminated in the first round by Angelina Love and Velvet Sky. On the September 17 edition of Impact! she was one of the lumberjacks for the match between Alissa Flash and Cody Deaner.

=== Independent circuit (2008–2013) ===
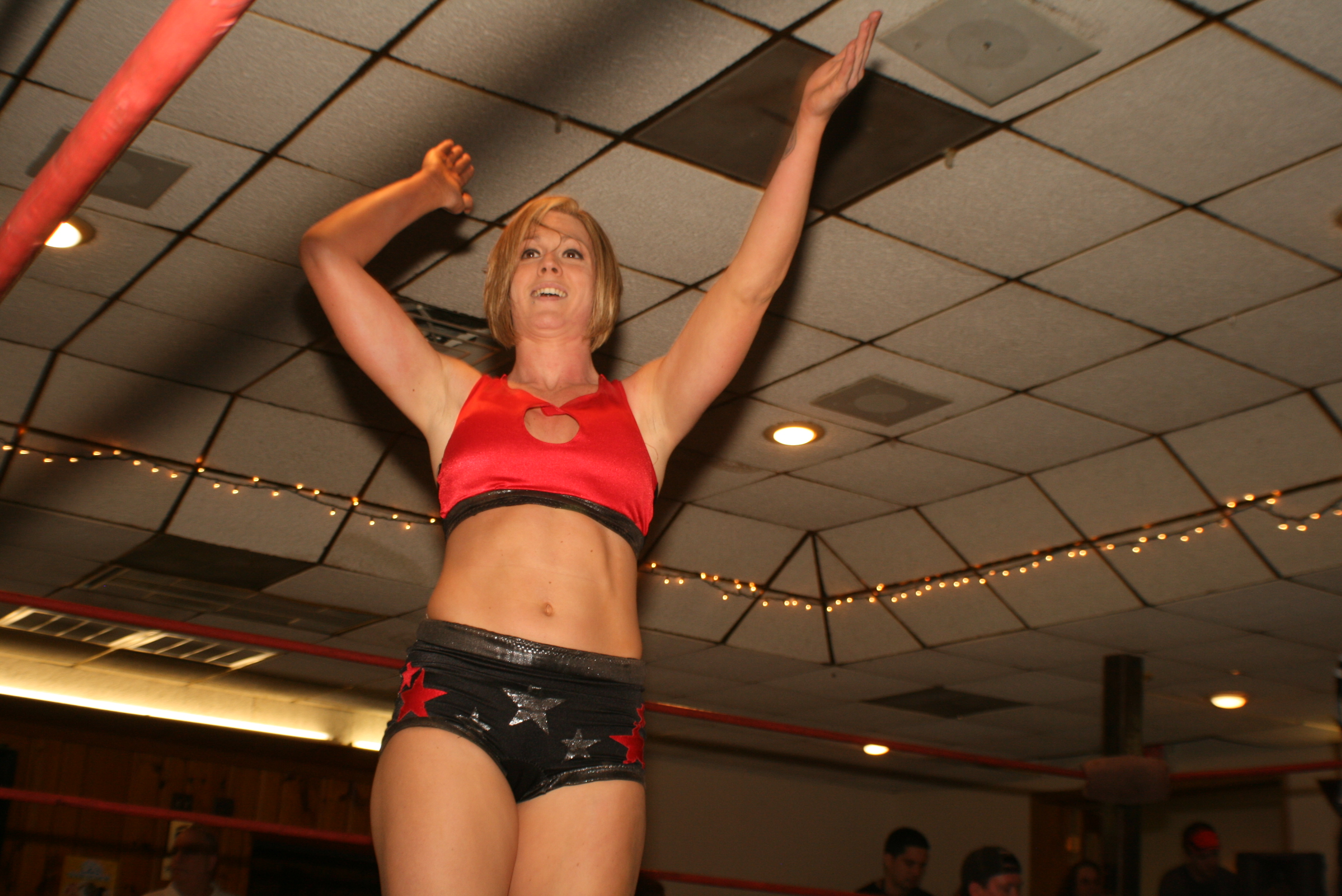
Nikki Roxx at a Women Superstars Uncensored show in 2010

Once again as Nikki Roxx, she became the fourth woman to hold the Women Superstars Uncensored's WSU Championship, defeating then champion Tammy Lynn Sytch and Alexa Thatcher in a three-way match. This match took place on March 21, 2008, in Bergenfield, New Jersey. Roxx pinned Thatcher to capture the title as Sytch was distracted by Becky Bayless. On May 31, in Rahway, New Jersey, Roxx lost the title to Angel Orsini in a Jersey All Pro Wrestling event. As Roxxi, she became the first Eastern Pro Wrestling Women's Champion at an event in Fall River, Massachusetts, on August 1, 2008. She is also a regular competitor for Squared Circle Wrestling (2CW) based out of Upstate New York. On September 28, 2009, Roxx appeared on Ring of Honor's weekly HDNet program, losing in a match to Sara Del Rey.

Raczynski made her debut for Lucha Libre AAA World Wide (AAA) in México on August 21, 2009, in the Verano de Escándalo show, where she, as Roxxi, was presented by Konnan as the newest member of La Legión Extranjera along with Teddy Hart, Jennifer Blake, Rain and Nicole. Despite being advertised for later shows, she has not appeared for the company since her debut.

In May 2011, Raczynski began working under the name Nikki Corleone, playing the role as Marco Corleone's sister for MTV2's Lucha Libre USA. She made her debut for the promotion on the May 28, defeating Chrissy Cialis.

=== Return to TNA (2009–2011) ===
Raczynski returned to TNA as Roxxi on the December 17 edition of Impact!, defeating TNA Women's Knockout Champion ODB in a non-title match. Afterwards, Roxxi was assaulted by ODB, with her signature flask, before being saved by Tara. On December 21 at the tapings of Impact! Raczynski broke her ankle in two places in a match against Hamada. She was expected to miss 6 weeks due to injury She was once again let go from the company on March 4, 2010.

On May 17, 2010, at the tapings of the May 20 edition of Impact!, Raczynski, once again using the ring name Roxxi, made another return to TNA, defeating Women's Knockout Champion Madison Rayne in a non-title match, earning herself a shot at the title at Slammiversary VIII in the process. Two weeks later, Roxxi got a victory over the debuting Rosie Lottalove, rolling her up after she refused to take advantage of an interference from Madison Rayne. At Slammiversary VIII Roxxi agreed to put her TNA career on the line against Rayne and her Women's Knockout Championship. Rayne retained her title, ending Roxxi's TNA career in the process.

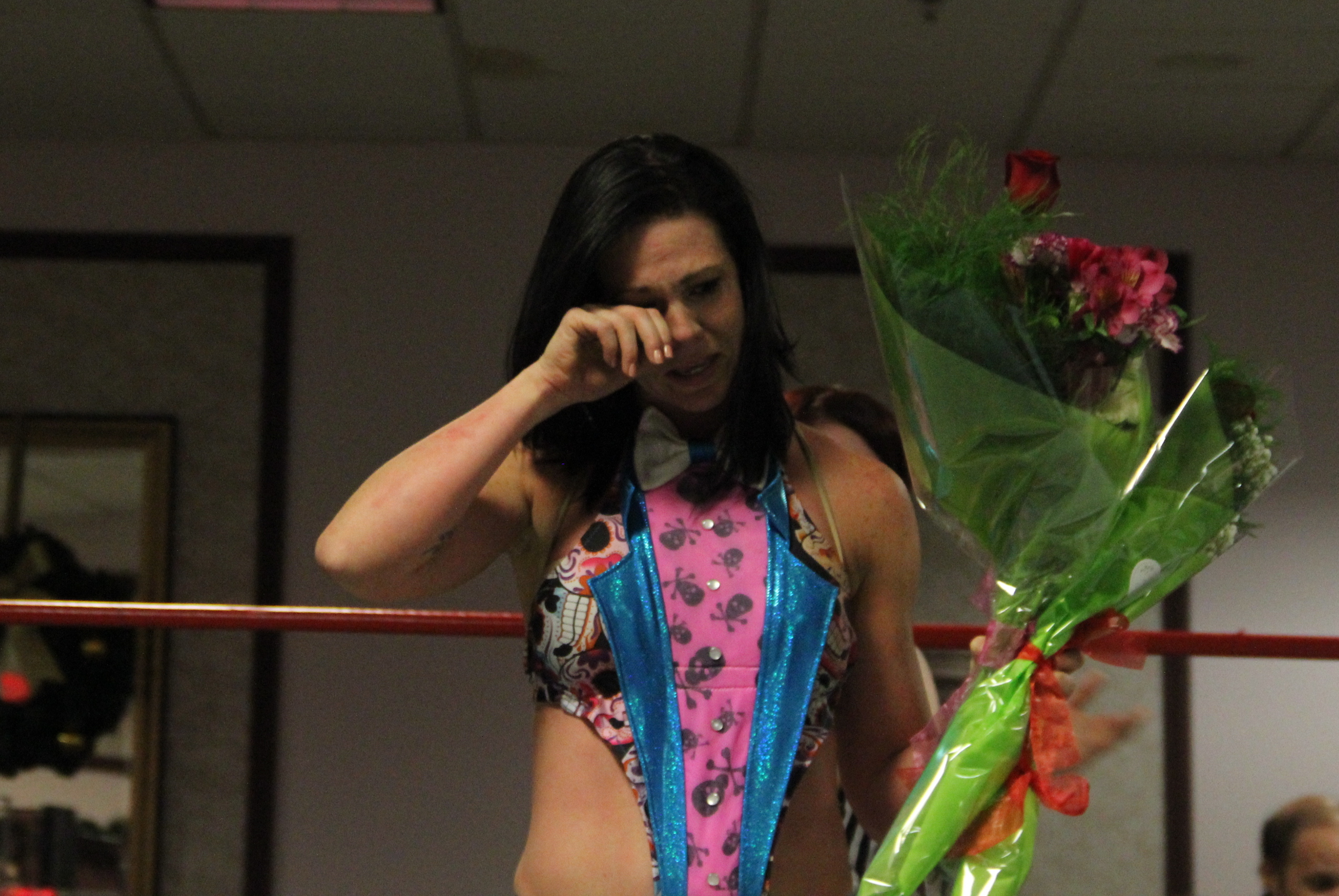
Roxx after her retirement match in December 2013.

On February 24, 2011, at the tapings of the March 10 edition of Impact!, Roxxi made a one night return to TNA, when she answered TNA Women's Knockout Champion Madison Rayne's open challenge and was then defeated by her in a title match.

In March 2013, Raczynski turned down an offer to take part in a special all-Knockouts pay-per-view held by TNA.

=== Retirement (2013) ===
In October 2013, Raczynski announced her retirement from professional wrestling in order to concentrate on her fitness career and company. Her retirement match was promoted by Lucky Pro Wrestling (LPW) on December 6 in Clinton, Massachusetts. On December 6, Roxx defeated Alexxis in her retirement match.

== Championships and accomplishments ==
- Chaotic Wrestling
  - Chaotic Wrestling Women's Championship (1 time)
- Defiant Pro Wrestling
  - DPW Women's Championship (1 time)
- Eastern Pro Wrestling
  - EPW Women's Championship (1 time)
  - Ringside Rumble (2008)
- IndyGurlz
  - IndyGurlz Championship (1 time)
- Lucha Libre Femenil
  - LLF Juvenil Championship (1 time)
  - LLF Tag Team Championship (1 time) – with Diana La Cazadora
  - LLF Copa de Reynosa
- Melting Pot Championship Wrestling
  - MPC Women's Championship (1 time)
- New England Championship Wrestling
  - NECW World Women's Championship (1 time)
- Pro Wrestling Illustrated
  - Ranked No. 7 of the top 50 female wrestlers in the PWI Female 50 in 2008
- Professional Girl Wrestling Association
  - PGWA Championship (1 time)
- Total Nonstop Action Wrestling
  - Queen of the Cage (2008)
- Ultimate Wrestling (NY)
  - Women's Champion (1 time)
- Women Superstars Uncensored
  - WSU Championship (1 time)
  - WSU/NWS King and Queen of the Ring (2008) – with Rhett Titus
  - WSU Uncensored Rumble (2009)
- World Women's Wrestling
  - World Women's Wrestling Championship (1 time)
- World Xtreme Wrestling
  - WXW Women's Championship (1 time)

== Luchas de Apuestas record ==
| Winner (wager) | Loser (wager) | Location | Event | Date | Notes |
|---|---|---|---|---|---|
| Nikki Roxx (hair) | Arianna (mask) | Monterrey, Nuevo León, Mexico | Live event | October 28, 2004 | |
| Nikki Roxx (hair) | Polly Star (hair) | Monterrey, Nuevo León, Mexico | Live event | December 17, 2004 | |
| Gail Kim (hair) | Roxxi Laveaux (hair) | Orlando, Florida | Sacrifice (2008) | May 11, 2008 | (Note: This was a ladder match.) |
| Madison Rayne (title) | Roxxi (career) | Orlando, Florida | TNA Slammiversary VIII | June 13, 2010 | |
