= World Women's Wrestling =

Women's professional wrestling promotion

- Acronym: WWW
- Founded: 2006
- Defunct: 2010
- Style: Women's professional wrestling
- Headquarters: Jamaica Plain, Massachusetts, United States
- Founder: Sheldon Goldberg
- Owner: Sheldon Goldberg (2006–current)
- Parent: New England Championship Wrestling
- Website: WorldWomensWrestling.com

World Women's Wrestling (WWW or Triple W) was a New England based women's professional wrestling promotion. New England Championship Wrestling (NECW) recognized the World Women's Wrestling Championship, and it was defended at NECW events.

== Alumni ==
- Adrianna
- Alexxis Nevaeh
- Alicia
- Amber
- Barbie
- Cha Cha
- Deanna Deville
- Della Morte
- Elektra Arion
- Ivy
- Jana
- Kayla Sparks
- Luscious Latasha
- Malia Hosaka
- Melissa Coates
- Mia Love
- Mistress Belmont
- Natalia
- Nikki Roxx
- Nikki Valentine
- Portia Perez
- Sammi Lane
- Sara Del Rey
- Taeler Hendrix
- Tanya Lee
- Tina Marina
- Toxis
- Violet Flame

== Championship ==
World Women's Wrestling Championship

Details
- Promotion: New England Championship Wrestling
- Date established: June 5, 2005
- Current champion: Vanity VixSin
Statistics
- First champion: Mercedes Martinez
- Most reigns: Alexxis Nevaeh (4 times)
- Longest reign: Alexxis Nevaeh (1189 days)
- Shortest reign: Natalia (20 days)

The World Women's Wrestling Championship was a professional wrestling title contested in World Women's Wrestling and New England Championship Wrestling. It was originally known as NECW World Women's Championship until the NECW and PWF Mayhem Women's Championships were unified. Due to a split between partners, NECW and WWW temporarily closed on November 6, 2010. In May 2011, NECW returned under the sole ownership of Sheldon Goldberg. The WWW title continued to be the recognized women's title of the promotion. On November 22, 2015, NECW brought World Women's Wrestling back as a stand-alone promotion presented by New England Championship Wrestling.

=== Names ===
Name	Years
NECW World Women's Championship	2005—2006
World Women's Wrestling Championship	2006–present

=== Reigns ===
#	Wrestler	Reign	Date	Days held	Location	Notes
1	Mercedes Martinez	1	June 5, 2005	112	Somerville, MA	Mercedes Martinez defeated Nikki Roxx in an 8-woman tournament final to become the inaugural champion.
2	Natalia	1	September 25, 2005	20	Somerville, MA	
3	Violet Flame	1	October 15, 2005	141	Somerville, MA	
4	Nikki Roxx	1	March 5, 2006	259	Somerville, MA	Defeated Violet Flame and Mercedes Martinez in a three-way match. On August 13, 2006, Roxx defeated PWF Mayhem champion Alere Little Feather to become the unified World Women's Wrestling champion.
5	Tanya Lee	1	November 19, 2006	266	Somerville, MA	
6	Alexxis Nevaeh	1	August 12, 2007	210	Somerville, MA	Defeated Tanya Lee, Jana and Natalia in fatal four-way match.
7	Ariel	1	March 9, 2008	517	Somerville, MA	
8	Alexxis Nevaeh	2	August 8, 2009	224	Quincy, MA	
9	Mistress Belmont	1	March 20, 2010	141	Quincy, MA	
10	Alexxis Nevaeh	3	August 8, 2010	1189	Quincy, MA	Defeated Mistress Belmont in a steel cage match. The title was not retained by PWF Northeast after the closure of NECW on November 6, 2010. Therefore, Nevaeh is recognized as the final champion. The title was revived along with NECW on May 14, 2011, with Nevaeh as champion.
11	Mistress Belmont	2	November 9, 2013	301	Beverly, MA	Defeated Alexxis with outside help from stablemates Miss Sammi Lane and Nikki Valentine.
12	Jasmin	1	September 6, 2014	28	Everett, MA	
13	Mistress Belmont	3	October 4, 2014	518	Everett, MA	
14	Nikki Valentine	1	March 5, 2016	126	Wakefield, MA	
	Vacant		July 9, 2016	35	Brockton, MA	NECW/WWW promoter Sheldon Goldberg stripped Valentine of the title after her manager James Maddox repeatedly interfered in her title defense, a 3-way match also including Davienne and Mistress Belmont, and stablemate Vanity Vixsin attacked a referee.
15	Alexxis Nevaeh	4	August 13, 2016	28	Wakefield, MA	Neveah won title by defeating Vanity Vixsin, Mistress Belmont and Sonya Strong in the 30-minute Iron Woman match final on WWW's inaugural Iron Maiden Championship.
16	Vanity Vixsin	1	September 10, 2016	3392+	Wakefield, MA	

=== Combined reigns ===
†	Indicates the current champion

Rank	Wrestler	No. of reigns	Combined days
1	Vanity Vixsin †	1	3,392+
2	Alexxis Nevaeh	4	1,551
3	Mistress Belmont	3	960
4	Ariel	1	517
5	Tanya Lee	1	266
6	Nikki Roxx	1	259
7	Violet Flame	1	141
8	Nikki Valentine	1	126
9	Mercedes Martinez	1	112
10	Jasmin	1	28
11	Natalia	1	20
