= Alisha Edwards =

American professional wrestler

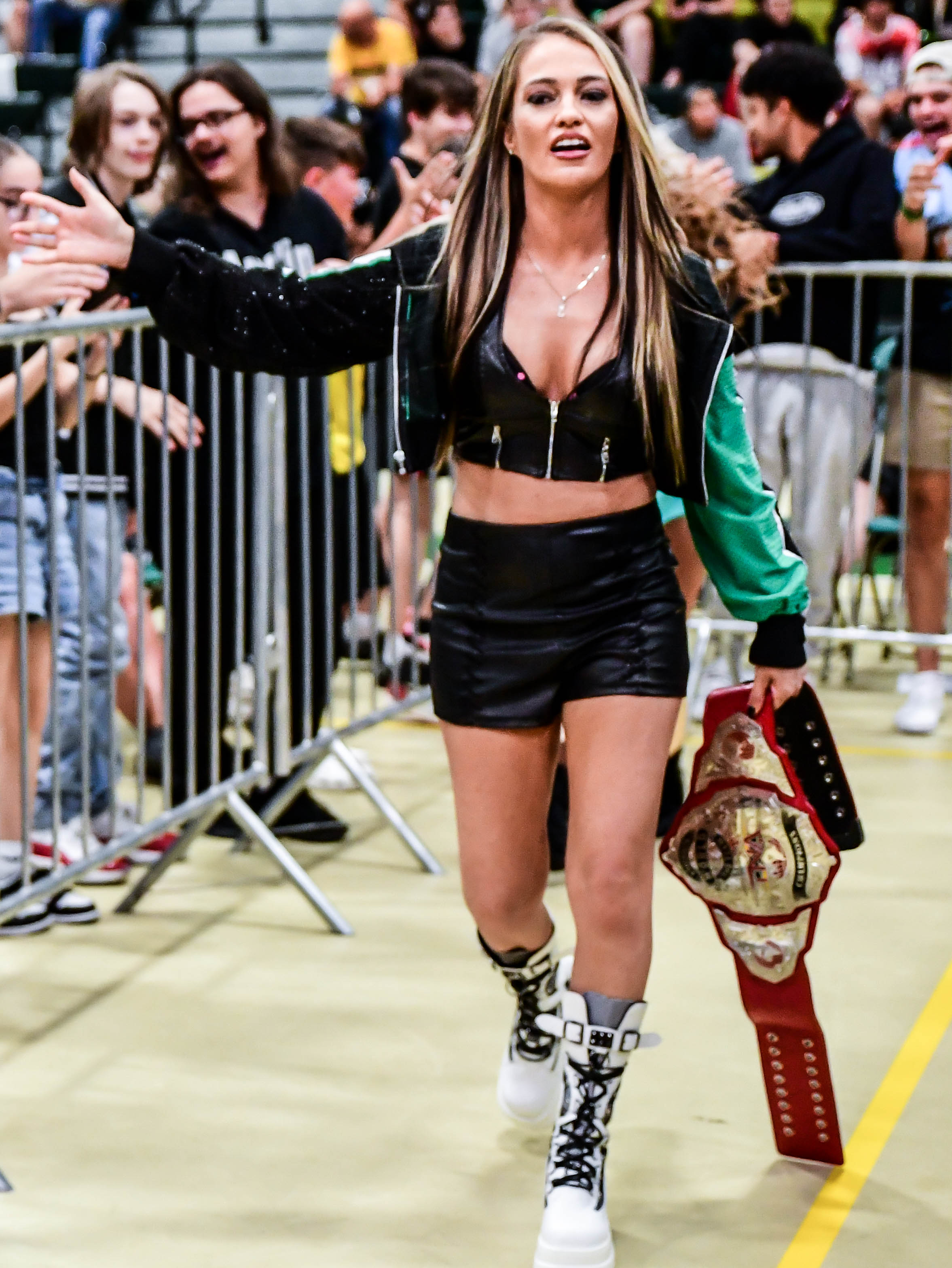
- Alisha in 2024

Personal information
- Born: Alisha Inacio; January 7, 1987 (age 39) New Bedford, Massachusetts, U.S.
- Spouse: Eddie Edwards (m. 2015)
- Children: 1

Professional wrestling career
- Ring name(s): Alexxis; Alexxis Nevaeh; Alexxus; Alisha Edwards; Lexxus; Mercedes Steele; Sassy Massy
- Billed from: Boston, Massachusetts; The Bronx, New York
- Trained by: Chaotic Wrestling
- Debut: July 3, 2004

Alisha Maher (née Inacio; born January 7, 1987) is an American professional wrestler. She is signed to Total Nonstop Action Wrestling (TNA), where she performs under the ring name Alisha Edwards and serves as both a wrestler and the on-screen manager of The System. She is a one-time TNA Knockouts World Tag Team Champion (along with Masha Slamovich).

== Professional wrestling career ==
=== New England Championship Wrestling / World Women's Wrestling (2004–2013) ===
Edwards debuted in May 2006, at a joint New England Championship Wrestling (NECW) and World Women's Wrestling (WWW) show on May 7, defeating Mia Love. Over the next few weeks, she lost to Tanya Lee, but defeated Della Morte. This win however, would prove to be her last in 2006, as she lost to Tanya Lee, Kacee Carlisle by disqualification, Portia Perez, and Alicia. On January 27, 2007, at NECW's SnowBrawl show, she challenged Tanya Lee for the World Women's Wrestling Championship, but was unsuccessful. She broke her losing streak at the NECW/WWW show, Pick you Poison, on February 25, when she defeated Portia Perez. At the NECW/WWW 1st Anniversary Spectacular show on March 25, Edwards defeated Mistress Belmont, who was accompanied by Della Morte. After the match, Morte attacked Edwards, and attempted to burn her with a curling iron, but Ariel saved her.

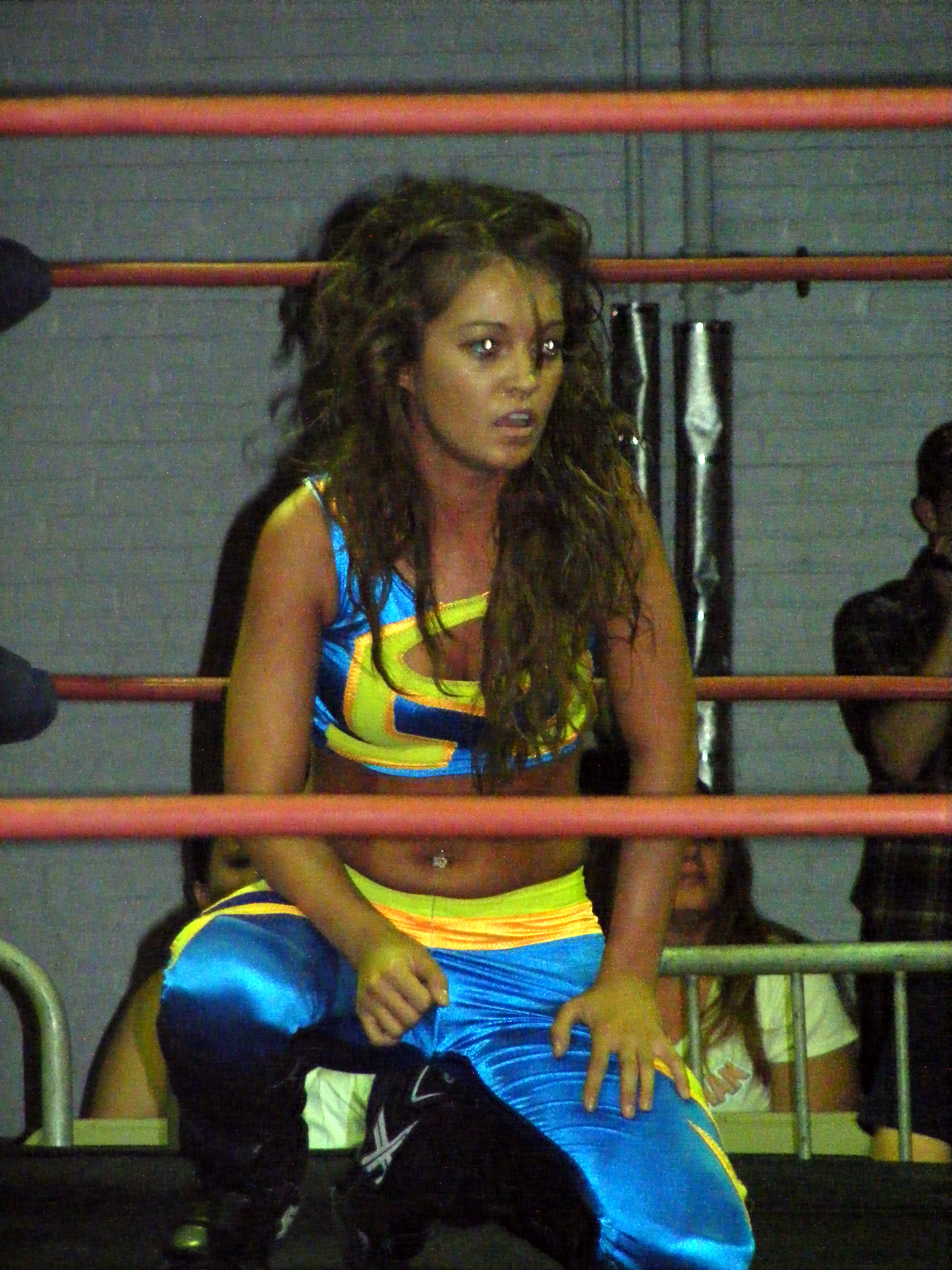
Edwards at a New England Championship Wrestling show in 2009.

Edwards then began challenging for the World Women's Wrestling Championship, defeating the championship Tanya Lee on two separate occasions in non-title matches. When she gained an opportunity to win the championship at the Double Intensity event, however, she was unsuccessful. On August 12, Edwards competed in two matches at a NECW/WWW show. In the first, she lost to Tanya Lee by disqualification in a singles match. In the second, however, she won the championship in a four-way match, defeating Tanya Lee, Natalia and Jana on August 12, 2007. She successfully defended the championship against Tanya Lee, Ariel, Mistress Belmont and Sammi Lane. She lost the championship to Ariel on March 9, 2009, after holding it for a year and a half. She regained the title from Ariel after defeating 10 top WWW stars first to get the title shot. She lost it to Mistress Belmont, who lost it to Edwards on August 8, 2010, in a steel cage match.

New England Championship Wrestling returned in May 2011 with A Fight For Alex 2 and in their first show back, Edwards was successful in defending her World Women's Wrestling Championship against Mistress Belmont. Later in that year, at The Fight Before Christmas, she successfully defended her WWW Championship again against Adrianna this time. Edwards would go on to face Adrianna several more times in 2012, became embroiled in a heated feud with Adrianna that would last a whole year and culminate in a "Taped Fist" match at NECW's December event in 2012, Unwrapped in Blackstone, MA. Edwards defeated Adrianna yet again and would move on to other challenges.

In 2013, Edwards had her hands full with longtime rival Mistress Belmont as well as the returning Nikki Valentine to NECW. Edwards would successfully defeat each over the course of that year. It would either be Edwards involved in a match with one of them, or her partner and ally Kasey Ray. Often doing so via disqualification after Mistress Belmont or Nikki Valentine would receive a mysterious package at ringside or left under the ring containing various weapons such as a steel chain, whip, or even brass knuckles, and using the various weapons and being disqualified. It wasn't until NECW's 13th anniversary event, Bash 13 when Miss Sammi Lane made her return to NECW after a three-year hiatus, revealing herself to be the mystery gift giver, along with her "sisters" Mistress Belmont and Nikki Valentine during a tag team match with Edwards and Kasey Ray. With that the numbers battle became too much for Edwards to cope with. At Double Intensity in Beverly, MA on November 9, 2013, with both Nikki Valentine and Miss Sammi Lane in her corner, Mistress Belmont was able to successfully defeat Edwards for her championship, ending her 1,190 day reign as WWW Champion, the longest title reign in company history.

=== Chaotic Wrestling (2007–2011) ===
Edwards began competing in Chaotic Wrestling in March 2007, losing matches to Tanya Lee throughout March and April. After a match against Danny E. on May 18, Edwards then became the third member of The Blowout Boys along with Danny E. and Tommy T., and gained the nickname the "Double X Diva". Her most memorable matches involved feuding with Nikki Roxx.

The Blowout Boys briefly separated in September 2008, and Edwards remained with Danny while Tommy hired his girlfriend, Adriana, as his new manager. On November 7 at Night of Chaos, Edwards defeated Adriana in a match where the Blowout Boys were handcuffed together at ringside. On December 5, Edwards changed her ring name to Alexxis at the event where Tommy turned on Adriana and rejoined Edwards and Danny E. The Blowout Boys' first match since they reunited was on February 6, 2009, at Cold Fury 8: Infinite Possibilities, when they defeated Fred Sampson and Psycho.

On June 3, 2011, Edwards won the Chaotic Wrestling Women's Championship by defeating Nikki Roxx. After three title defenses over Ivy, Mercedes KV and Nikki Roxx; Edwards lost the Women's Championship to Mercedes KV in an "I Quit" match on December 2.

=== Total Nonstop Action Wrestling (2008, 2015) ===
Edwards initially appeared in Total Nonstop Action Wrestling in 2008 on the September 17 episode, under the name Mercedes Steele. Edwards faced Awesome Kong in a losing effort.

Edwards appeared at the tapings of TNA's third Knockouts Knockdown PPV on February 15, 2015 (aired on July 1, 2015), under her real name and was defeated by Madison Rayne.

=== Women Superstars Uncensored (2010–2013) ===
Inacio made her debut for Women Superstars Uncensored (WSU) on March 6, 2010, under the name Lexxus, teaming up with Amber against Tina San Antonio & Marti Belle, in a winning effort. They later renamed the team to The Boston Shore. She was on the winning team on June 26, 2010, in an eight-woman tag team match, defeating Jennifer Cruz, Monique & The Killer Babes.

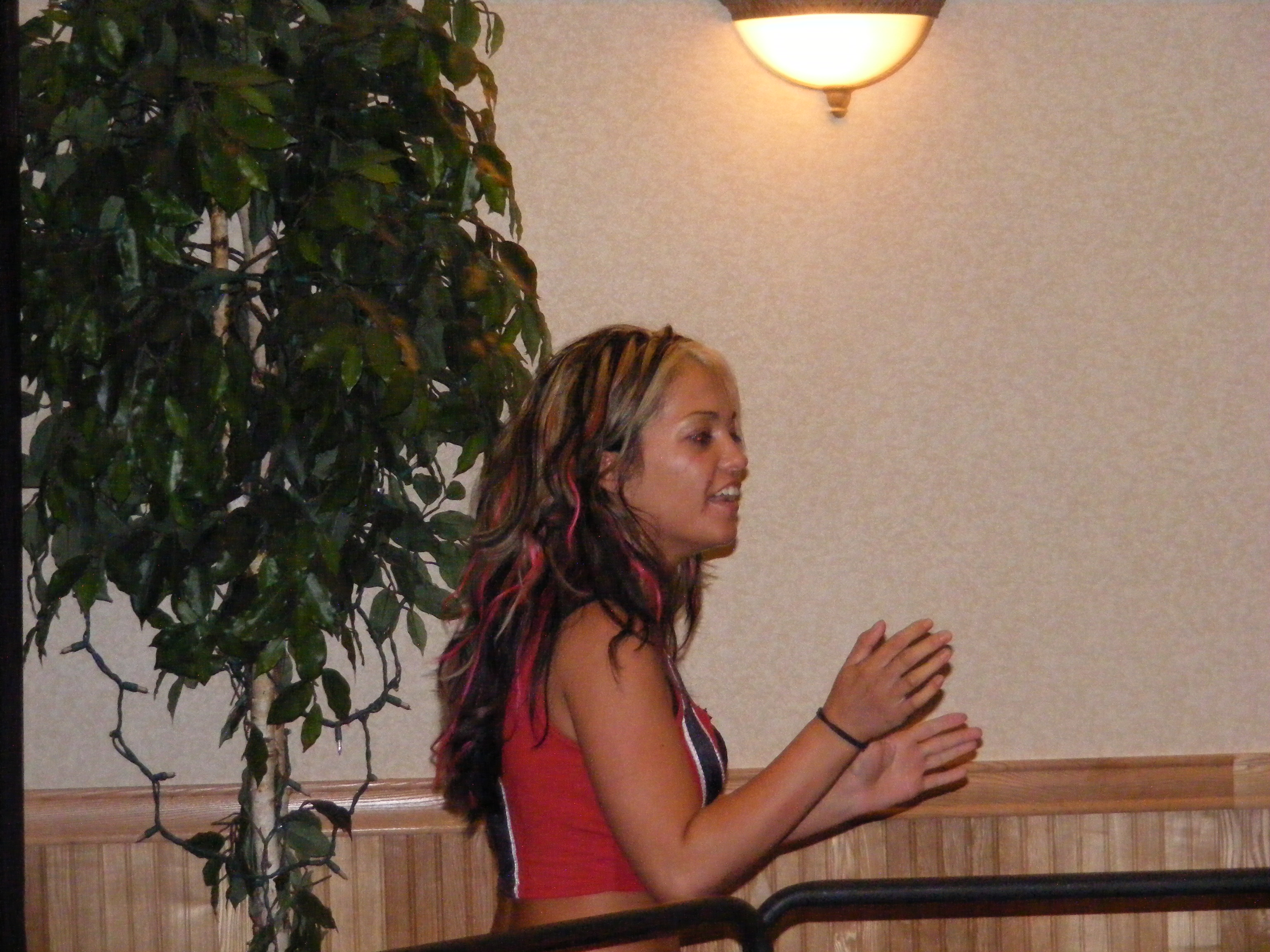
Alexxus in 2010

On May 27, 2011, at a PWS event in Queens, New York, The Boston Shore defeated The Belle Saints to win the WSU Tag Team Championship for the first time due to the miscommunication of The Belle Saints and Jazz. On June 25, 2011, at the Uncensored Rumble, The Boston Shore made their first title defense against The Belle Saints in a rematch, in which The Boston Shore emerged victorious due to the distraction by Amber. However, later in the night Lexxus joined the 4th annual Uncensored Rumble match at No. 1, and last eliminated Serena to win the match.

Following her win, Lexxus got the right to face Mercedes Martinez for the WSU Championship. She faced Martinez in a record-breaking 73-minute contest, the longest women's wrestling match in history, but was unsuccessful in winning the title. On February 13, Amber decided to quit pro wrestling due personal demons and issues. However, WSU decided to leave Lexxus as the co-champion until she finds herself a new partner. Lexxus would end up losing the tag team titles in March. In April, she entered the J-Cup but went to a double count-out with Alicia. On June 16, Lexxus won the Uncensored Rumble for the second consecutive year albeit through controversial means as the referee missed her elimination. On October 13, 2012, at Full Steam Ahead, Lexxus was granted a WSU Championship opportunity in a Triple Threat match against WSU Champion Jessicka Havok and Alicia. Lexxus was unsuccessful as Havok pinned Alicia to retain her title.

=== Return to Impact Wrestling / TNA (2017–present) ===
==== Feud with Angelina Love and Davey Richards (2017–2018) ====
On the February 9, 2017, episode of Impact Wrestling, Alisha returned as a face, watching her husband Eddie Edwards from the crowd where Davey Richards pulled the referee out of the ring and cost her husband his match against Lashley. Alisha attempted to help her husband, only to be attacked by the returning Angelina Love. After the match, Alisha and Edwards were both attacked by Love and Richards. at GFW/ Impact Wrestling's 15th Anniversary PPV Slammiversary, Alisha Edwards teamed up with her husband Eddie Edwards versus Davey Richards and Angelina Love in the first ever Intergender Tag Team Full Metal Mayhem match on July 2, in a winning effort. This was Love's final match with TNA now known as GFW before departing the company, ending their feud between the couples.

==== Storyline with Eddie Edwards (2018–2019) ====
At Redemption, Eddie Edwards accidentally hit Alisha with a kendo stick while brawling with Sami Callihan. Eddie's change of behavior started a feud with Tommy Dreamer. After Eddie defeated Dreamer at Slammiversary XVI and ending their feud, Alisha and Dreamer left Eddie alone in the ring, after he made peace with Dreamer. From August 2019, Alisha was involved in a storyline with Ace Austin and Eddie, where Austin started to show romantic interest towards Alisha, questioning her relationship with Eddie. On the November 5 episode of Impact!, Alisha overheard Austin saying that he is using Alisha to play mind games with Eddie. Alisha set a trap to Austin by inviting him to her hotel room, only to get attacked by Eddie Edwards. On the November 22 episode of Impact!, she teamed up with Fallah Bahh, Kikutaro, KM and Dezmond Xavier to defeat Eli Drake, Jake Crist, Rohit Raju, Katarina and Glenn Gilbertti in the Second Annual Eli Drake Gravy Train Turkey Trot match.

==== Various storylines (2020–2022) ====
After a hiatus, Alisha made her in-ring return on the June 23, 2020, episode of Impact!, when she unsuccessfully challenged Deonna Purrazzo. On the July 14 episode of Impact!, she teamed with Kylie Rae, Susie, Havok and Nevaeh in a 10 Knockout tag team match to defeat the team of Kimber Lee, Kiera Hogan, Tasha Steelz, Rosemary and Taya Valkyrie. At Slammiversary, she competed in a Gauntlet for the Gold match to determine the number one contender for the Knockouts Championship, which was won by Rae. On the July 28 episode of Impact!, Alisha joined a bunch of wrestlers in the reality show Wrestle House. The following week, she teamed with Susie to defeat Johnny Swinger in a mixed gender handicap match. On the August 11 episode of Impact!, Alisha was blamed by Susie for giving her bad dating advice during her date with Cousin Jake, leading to a match between them that Alisha lost after a roll-up. On the September 1 episode of Impact!, Alisha and the rest of the Wrestle House cast returned to the Impact Zone during Knockouts Champion Deonna Purrazzo's Black Tie Affair.

On the September 8 episode of Impact!, Alisha confronted Impact World Champion Eric Young for taking out her husband Eddie after winning his title last week, almost getting piledriven by Young before being saved by Tommy Dreamer. At Bound for Glory, she competed in the Call Your Shot Gauntlet match, where the winner could choose any championship match of their choice, but was eliminated by Brian Myers. On the October 27 episode of Impact!, she teamed up with Jordynne Grace in a losing effort against Kiera Hogan and Tasha Steelz. At Turning Point, Impact Wrestling announced that Alisha will compete alongside Tenille Dashwood in a tournament to crown new Impact Knockouts Tag Team Champions. On the November 17 episode of Impact!, Alisha and Tenille were defeated by Havok and Nevaeh during the first round of the Knockouts Tag Team Championship Tournament. In early December, she went after Sami Callihan for attacking her husband Eddie, who managed to scare him off after taking his bat. At Final Resolution, she and Eddie lost an intergender tag team match against Tenille and Kaleb with a K.

On the March 23, 2021, episode of Before the Impact, Alisha lost to Knockouts Tag Team Champion Tasha Steelz. On April 10, at Hardcore Justice, she competed in a weapons match to determine the number one contender for the Knockouts Championship, which was won by Tenille Dashwood. On July 31, at Homecoming, Alisha teamed with Hernandez to compete in a tournament to crown a Homecoming King and Queen, but were defeated by eventual winners Deonna Purrazzo and Matthew Rehwoldt in the first round. At Victory Road, during a tag team match involving her husband Eddie and Sami Callihan against W. Morrissey and Moose, she was powerbombed by Morrissey in the ring. In October, Alisha competed in the Shannon "Daffney" Spruill Memorial Monster's Ball match at Knockouts Knockdown, which was won by Savannah Evans. She then entered a tournament to determine the inaugural Impact Digital Media Champion, where she was defeated by Dashwood in the first round. At Bound for Glory, Alisha competed in the Call Your Shot Gauntlet, where the winner could choose any championship match of their choice, but was eliminated by W. Morrissey.

On January 8, 2022, at Hard to Kill, Alisha participated in the inaugural Knockouts Ultimate X match, which was won by Tasha Steelz. On the March 31 episode of Impact!, she competed in a Knockouts World Championship #1 Contenders Battle Royal, which was won by Rosemary.

==== The System (2023–present) ====
On the April 6, 2023, episode of Impact!, Alisha helped Eddie Edwards defeat PCO, turning heel for the first time in her Impact career.

On January 13, 2024, during a backstage interview at the "Countdown to TNA Hard To Kill" pre-show, Alisha, Eddie Edwards, Moose, Brian Myers and DeAngelo Williams would form a stable calling themselves "The System". Later in the show, Alisha participated in an Ultimate X match to determine the number one contender for the TNA Knockouts World Championship, which was won by Gisele Shaw. Alisha and the rest of The System accompanied Moose to his main event match for the TNA World Championship against Alex Shelley. During the match, Edwards and the rest of The System attempted to distract Shelley, prompting a brawl with Shelley's partners, Chris Sabin and Kushida. Moose later won the match, after which he was confronted by Nic Nemeth. In April 2024, Alisha and the rest of The System encouraged Masha Slamovich to team up with her to challenge Spitfire (Dani Luna and Jody Threat) for the TNA Knockouts World Tag Team Championship. On May 3 at Under Siege, Slamovich and Alisha defeated Spitfire to win the TNA Knockouts World Tag Team Championship. At Victory Road on September 13, Alisha was replaced by Tasha Steelz due to still being under concussion protocols (storyline). They lost the TNA Knockouts World Tag Team Championship to Spitfire. After the match, Alisha and Steelz turned on Slamovich and attacked her, thus kicking Slamovich out of The System.

On the January 22, 2026 episode of Impact!, Moose and JDC were both kicked out of The System, and were replaced by Bear Bronson and Cedric Alexander. Alisha did not participate in the betrayal. She later confirmed the following week that she would be leaving the group. After leaving The System, Alisha remained aligned with Moose against the stable, acting as his valet for his matches.

At Rebellion on April 11, Alisha was revealed to have secretly rejoined The System and her husband Eddie Edwards to sabotage Moose, exposing a long-planned betrayal.

=== Women Of Wrestling (2019) ===
Edwards made her debut on Women Of Wrestling (WOW) on the September 7 episode of the show under the name Sassy Massy, where she defeated The Disciplinarian. Through the second season, Massy teamed with Chantilly Chella in the WOW World Tag Team Championship Tournament, where they were eliminated in the second round by the Monsters of Madness (Jessicka Havok and Hazard).

== Personal life ==
Inacio is married to fellow professional wrestler Eddie Edwards. The two have one daughter together.

== Championships and accomplishments ==
- Chaotic Wrestling
  - Chaotic Wrestling Women's Championship (3 times)
  - Chaotic Wrestling Tag Team Championship (1 time) – with Ace Romero, Danny Miles, J. T. Dunn, Mike Verna and Trigga The OG
- Impact Wrestling / Total Nonstop Action Wrestling
  - TNA Knockouts World Tag Team Championship (1 time) – with Masha Slamovich
  - Gravy Train Turkey Trot (2018) – with Dezmond Xavier, Fallah Bahh, Kikutaro and KM
  - TNA Year End Awards (1 time)
    - Faction of the Year (2025) as The System
- New England Championship Wrestling
- Lucky Pro Wrestling
  - LPW Women's Championship (2 times, current)
  - Iron Maiden Championship 2016 Tournament
- Pro Wrestling Illustrated
  - Ranked No. 46 of the top 50 female wrestlers in the PWI Female 50 in 2012
- South Coast Championship Wrestling
  - SCCW Women's Championship (1 time)
- World Women's Wrestling
  - World Women's Wrestling Championship (4 times)
- Women Superstars Uncensored
  - WSU Tag Team Championship (1 time) – with Amber
