= Chaotic Wrestling Pan Optic Championship =

Professional wrestling women's championship

- Past title design

Details
- Promotion: Chaotic Wrestling
- Date established: February 11, 2011
- Current champion: Dante Drago
- Date won: October 9, 2026

Other names
- Chaotic Wrestling Women's Championship (2011 - 2021); Chaotic Wrestling Higher Society Championship (2021); Chaotic Wrestling Pan Optic Championship (2021 - present)
Statistics
- First champion: Nikki Roxx
- Most reigns: Alexxis/Alisha Edwards (3 reigns)
- Longest reign: Kasey Ray (1st reign, 413 days)
- Shortest reign: Skylar (2nd reign, 42 days)
- Heaviest champion: Nikki Roxx (141 lb (64 kg))
- Lightest champion: Mercedes KV (114 lb (52 kg))

The Chaotic Wrestling Pan Optic Championship is a professional wrestling championship in Chaotic Wrestling. The inaugural champion was Nikki Roxx. The current champion is Dante Drago, who is in his first reign.

== Title history ==
As of October 12, 2026, there have been 27 reigns between 19 champions and three vacancies. Nikki Roxx was the inaugural champion. Alexxis/Alisha Edwards has the most reigns at three. Kasey Ray's first reign is the longest singular reign at 413 days, while Skylar's second reign is the shortest at 42 days.

Dante Drago is the current champion in his first reign. He defeated Milo Mirra, Omar La Casa, Paris Van Dale, Trigga the OG, and then-champion Shannon LeVangie in a six-way match at The Devil in Me on October 9, 2026 in Malden, MA.

Key
No.	Overall reign number
Reign	Reign number for the specific champion
Days	Number of days held
N/A	Unknown information
+	Current reign is changing daily

No.	Champion	Championship change			Reign statistics		Notes	Ref.
No.	Champion	Date	Event	Location	Reign	Days	Notes	Ref.
1	Nikki Roxx	February 11, 2011	Cold Fury 10	Lowell, MA	1	112	Defeated Alexxis, Jamilia Craft, Jennifer Cruz, Mercedes KV and Mistress Belmont in a six way gauntlet match to become inaugural champion.	
2	Alexxis	June 3, 2011	Chaotic Wrestling	Lowell, MA	1	182		
3	Mercedes KV	December 2, 2011	Fan Appreciation Night	Lowell, MA	1	378	This was an "I Quit" match.	
—	Vacated	December 2, 2012	Chaotic Wrestling	Lowell, MA	—	—	The championship was declared vacant after Mercedes KV signed with WWE.	
4	Barbie	December 14, 2012	Fan Appreciation Tour	Lowell, MA	1	291 – 321	This was a six women battle royal match for the vacant title, which involving Alexxis, Kasey Ray, Luscious Latasha, Mistress Belmont and Veda Scott.	
—	Vacated	October 2013	—	—	—	—	The championship was vacated after Barbie suffered an injury.	
5	Kasey Ray	December 13, 2013	Fan Appreciation Tour	Lowell, MA	1	413	Defeated Alexxis, Davienne and Mistress Belmont in a four-way match to win the vacant title.	
6	Mistress Belmont	January 30, 2015	Chaotic Wrestling	Lowell, MA	1	50		
7	Kasey Ray	March 21, 2015	Cold Fury 14: Divide & Conquer	Lowell, MA	2	48		
8	Mistress Belmont	May 8, 2015	Chaotic Wrestling	Lowell, MA	2	162		
9	Alexxis	October 17, 2015	Breaking Point	Stoneham, MA	2	174	Kasey Ray served as the special guest referee.	
10	Davienne	April 8, 2016	Cold Fury 15: Unbreakable	Lowell, MA	1	385		
11	Ashley Vox	April 28, 2017	The Chaotic Challenge Continues	Lowell, MA	1	322		
12	Alexxis/Alisha Edwards	March 16, 2018	Cold Fury 17: Resurrection	Haverhill, MA	3	77		
13	Skylar	June 1, 2018	Chaotic Countdown	Lowell, MA	1	168		
14	Tasha Steelz	November 16, 2018	Breaking Point	Lowell, MA	1	329		
15	Skylar	October 11, 2019	Elevated	Lowell, MA	2	42		
—	Vacated	November 22, 2019	—	—	—	—		
16	Tasha Steelz	November 22, 2019	Breaking Point	Andover, MA	2	112	Steelz defeated Alisha Edwards to win the vacant title.	
17	Ava	March 13, 2020	Live event	Lawrence, MA	1	328		
18	Becca	February 4, 2021	Reloaded	North Andover, MA	1	77		
19	Armani Kayos and Paris Van Dale	April 22, 2021	Reloaded	North Andover, MA	1	64	Kayos defeated Becca in a match slated for Van Dale to win the title.	
20	Becca	June 25, 2021	N/A	North Andover, MA	2	203		
21	Aaron Rourke	January 14, 2022	Pandemonium	Watertown, MA	1	196		
22	Armani Kayos	July 29, 2022	Chaotic Countdown	Lowell, MA	2	168		
23	Paris Van Dale	January 13, 2023	Pandemonium: Friday The 13th	Lowell, MA	2	511		
24	Aiden Aggro	June 7, 2024	Locked and Loaded	Watertown, MA	1	294		
25	Kalvin DuMont	March 28, 2025	Cold Fury XXIII	Lowell, MA	1	308		
26	Shannon LeVangie	January 30, 2026	Shock To The System	Malden, MA	1	252		
27	Dante Drago	October 9, 2026	The Devil In Me	Malden, MA	1	3+	This was a six-way match that also involved Milo Mirra, Omar La Casa, Paris Van Dale, and Trigga the OG.	

== Combined reigns ==
As of October 12, 2026.

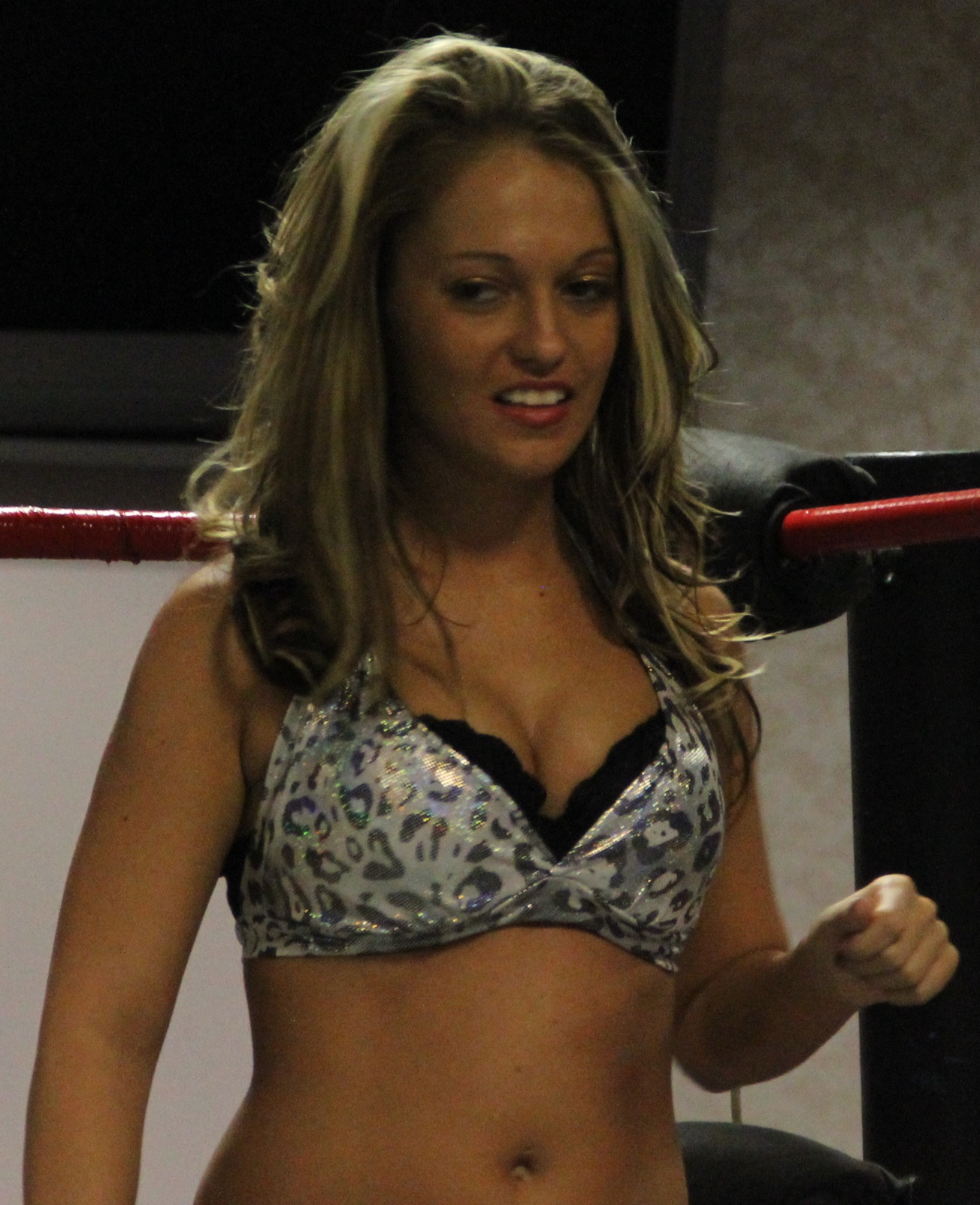
Record three-time champion Alexxis/Alisha Edwards

†	Indicates the current champion.
¤	The exact length of a title reign is uncertain; the combined length may not be correct.

Rank	Wrestler	No. of Reigns	Combined Days
1	Paris Van Dale	2	575
2	Kasey Ray	2	461
3	Tasha Steelz	2	441
4	Alexxis/Alisha Edwards	3	433
5	Davienne	1	385
6	Mercedes KV	1	378
7	Ava Everett	1	328
8	Ashley Vox	1	322
9	Kalvin DuMont	1	308
10	Aiden Aggro	1	294
11	Barbie	1	291 – 321¤
12	Becca	2	281
13	Shannon LeVangie	1	252
14	Armani Kayos	2	232
15	Mistress Belmont	2	212
16	Skylar	2	210
17	Aaron Rourke	1	197
18	Nikki Roxx	1	112
19	Dante Drago †	1	3+

== See also ==
- Chaotic Wrestling Heavyweight Championship
- Chaotic Wrestling New England Championship
- Chaotic Wrestling Tag Team Championship
