= WWE Evolve Men's Championship =

Professional wrestling championship

- The WWE Evolve Men's Championship belt with default side plates.

Details
- Promotion: WWE
- Brand: Evolve
- Date established: 2025 (Note: The exact date it was established is unknown, but the title's unveiling aired on the May 7, 2025, episode of Evolve.)
- Current champion: Harlem Lewis
- Date won: June 19, 2026 (aired July 15, 2026)

Other names
- WWE Evolve Championship (2025–2026); WWE Evolve Men's Championship (2026–present)
Statistics
- First champion: Jackson Drake
- Longest reign: Jackson Drake (301 days) (Note: 287 days as recognized by WWE due to tape delay.)
- Shortest reign: Aaron Rourke (119 days)
- Oldest champion: Aaron Rourke (30 years, 81 days)
- Youngest champion: Jackson Drake (21 years, 238 days)

The WWE Evolve Men's Championship is a professional wrestling championship created and promoted by the American promotion WWE, defended on the developmental brand Evolve. The title was established in early 2025 (aired May 7), and the inaugural champion was Jackson Drake. The current champion is Harlem Lewis, who is in his first reign. He won the title by defeating Aaron Rourke on the July 15, 2026, episode of Evolve (taped June 19).

The Evolve brand is a relaunch of the former Evolve promotion that WWE acquired in 2020. Although the championship shares a similar name, WWE's version of the title does not share a lineage with the original Evolve Championship of the former promotion. It is WWE's only championship that officially designates "men's" in the title's name; previously, only women's titles had this designation.

== History ==
In July 2020, the American professional wrestling company WWE acquired the independent promotion Evolve. In March 2025, WWE launched a developmental brand called Evolve, a relaunch of the former promotion, featuring WWE Performance Center trainees, as well as wrestlers signed to the WWE Independent Development program. On the May 7, 2025, episode of Evolve (tape date unknown), the brand's Prime Minister Stevie Turner announced the creation of the WWE Evolve men's and women's titles. The titles were designed to be defended exclusively on the Evolve brand, offering more opportunities for WWE rookie talent, giving them increased exposure and opportunities. Jackson Drake became the inaugural champion by defeating Keanu Carver, Edris Enofe, and Sean Legacy, who Drake last eliminated, in a fatal four-way elimination match during the June 4 episode of Evolve (taped April 25).

== Belt design ==
The WWE Evolve Men's Championship belt design is similar to the original Evolve Championship from the original Evolve promotion, but it consists of the WWE Evolve logo at the center of the center plate with the word "Champion" at bottom of the plate. The plates are silver and purple and are on a black strap. There are four side plates. Like all of WWE's championship belts, the inner side plates feature a removable center section that can be customized with the champion's logo; the default plates feature the WWE logo over a globe. The outer side plates also feature the WWE logo but not on a globe.

== Reigns ==
As of August 15, 2026, there have been three reigns. The inaugural champion was Jackson Drake, who has the longest reign at 301 days (287 days as recognized by WWE due to tape delay). Aaron Rourke has the shortest reign at 119 days. Drake is the youngest champion at 21, while Rourke is the oldest at 30.

Harlem Lewis is the current champion in his first reign. He won the title by defeating Aaron Rourke on the July 15, 2026, episode of Evolve, taped on June 19, in Orlando, Florida.

Key
No.	Overall reign number
Reign	Reign number for the specific champion
Days	Number of days held
Days recog.	Number of days held recognized by the promotion
+	Current reign is changing daily

No.	Champion	Championship change			Reign statistics			Notes	Ref.
No.	Champion	Date	Event	Location	Reign	Days	Days recog.	Notes	Ref.
WWE: Evolve
1	Jackson Drake	April 25, 2025	Evolve	Orlando, Florida	1	301	287	Defeated Keanu Carver, Edris Enofé, and Sean Legacy in a fatal four-way elimination match to become the inaugural champion. WWE recognizes Drake's reign as beginning on June 4 and ending on March 18, when the episode aired on tape delay.	
2	Aaron Rourke	February 20, 2026	Evolve	Orlando, Florida	1	119	119	WWE recognizes Rourke's reign as beginning on March 18, when the episode aired on tape delay. Jackson Drake continued to carry the title on episodes of NXT until the March 17 episode.	
3	Harlem Lewis	June 19, 2026	Evolve	Orlando, Florida	1	57	31+	WWE recognizes Lewis' reign as beginning on July 15, when the episode aired on tape delay.	
