= Aaron Rourke =

American professional wrestler

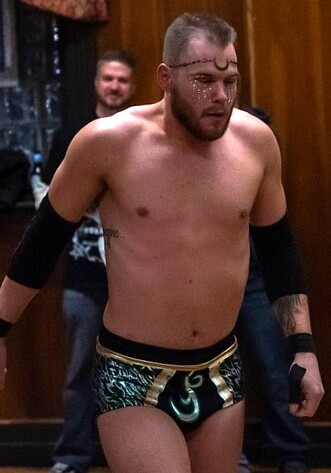
- Rourke in 2019

Personal information
- Born: December 1, 1995 (age 30) Long Island, New York, U.S.

Professional wrestling career
- Ring names: Aaron Rourke; D'Angoleme
- Billed from: Sparkle City; Long Island, New York
- Trained by: Brian Myers; Pat Buck
- Debut: September 11, 2018

Aaron Rourke (born December 1, 1995) is an American professional wrestler. As of November 2024, he is signed to WWE where he performs on the Evolve brand as part of the WWE ID program. He is a former one-time WWE Evolve Champion.

== Professional wrestling career ==
Rourke was trained by professional wrestlers Brian Myers and Pat Buck.

=== WWE (2024–present) ===
On November 18, 2024, Rourke was announced to be a part of the WWE ID program. Rourke was reportedly offered the contract after numerous supposed standout matches impressed scouts. He was the first openly LGBTQ person signed to the WWE ID program. Rourke participated in the inaugural WWE ID Championship tournament, however he was eliminated in the first round by It's Gal and Brad Baylor on April 16 and June 2, respectively. At GCW Presents WWE ID Showcase on August 1, Rourke was defeated by Timothy Thatcher.

On the March 18, 2026, episode of Evolve (taped February 20), Rourke defeated Jackson Drake to win the WWE Evolve Men's Championship. This made him the first openly gay WWE singles champion. He would hold the title for over a hundred days before losing it to Harlem Lewis on the July 15 episode of Evolve.

== Professional wrestling persona ==
Rourke is known as “Evil Gay” and “The Dime Piece”.

== Personal life ==
Rourke is openly gay.

== Championships and accomplishments ==
- Chaotic Wrestling
  - CW Heavyweight Championship (1 time)
  - CW Pan Optic Championship (1 time)
- Create A Pro Wrestling
  - CAP Championship (1 time)
  - CAP TV Championship (1 time)
- Pro Wrestling Illustrated
  - Ranked No. 131 of the top singles wrestlers in the PWI 500 in 2026
- WrestlePro
  - WrestlePro Silver Championship (1 time)
- Limitless Wrestling
  - Vacationland Cup (2025)
- WWE
  - WWE Evolve Men's Championship (1 time)
