= WWE =

American professional wrestling and entertainment company

World Wrestling Entertainment, LLC

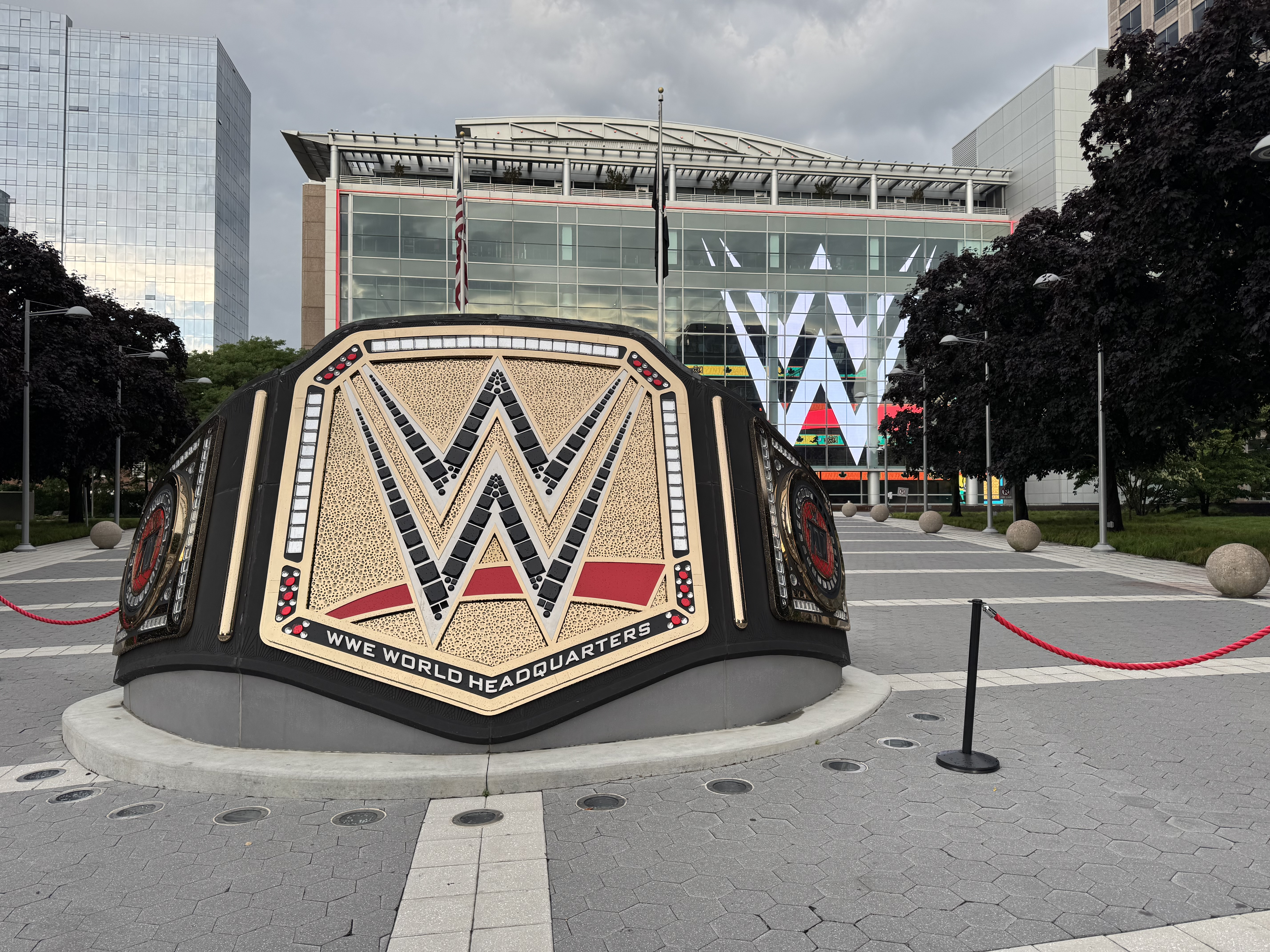
- Headquarters in Stamford, Connecticut
- Trade name: WWE
- Formerly: Titan Sports, Inc. (1980–1999); World Wrestling Federation Entertainment, Inc. (1999–2002); World Wrestling Entertainment, Inc. (2002–2023)
- Type: Subsidiary
- Traded as: NYSE: WWE (until 2023)
- Industry: Professional wrestling; sports entertainment; streaming media
- Predecessor: Capitol Wrestling Corporation
- Founded: January 1953; 73 years ago (as Capitol Wrestling Corporation Ltd.); April 1963; 63 years ago (rebranding as the World Wide Wrestling Federation); February 1980; 46 years ago (founding of Titan Sports, Inc.); June 1982; 44 years ago (purchase of Capitol Wrestling Corporation Ltd. by Titan Sports)
- Founder: Jess McMahon or Vincent J. McMahon (Note: The founder of Capitol Wrestling Corporation (CWC) is uncertain. While some sources claim that CWC was founded by Vincent J. McMahon, others claim that Jess McMahon founded the company.) (as Capitol Wrestling Corporation Ltd.); Vincent K. McMahon and Linda McMahon (as Titan Sports, Inc.)
- Headquarters: 707 Washington Blvd, Stamford, Connecticut, U.S.
- Area served: Worldwide
- Key people: Ari Emanuel (CEO, TKO); Mark Shapiro (COO, TKO); Nick Khan (president); Paul "Triple H" Levesque (Chief Content Officer)
- Products: Films; Home video; Live events; Merchandise; Music; Pay-per-view; Publishing; TV; Video on demand
- Services: Licensing
- Revenue: ▲US$1.709 billion (2025)
- Operating income: ▲US$896.5 million (2025)
- Parent: TKO Group Holdings (Note: Vince McMahon is the largest individual shareholder, with a 3.4% stake in TKO Group Holdings.)
- Divisions: WWE Books; WWE Libraries; WWE Music Group; WWE Performance Center; WWE Studios
- Subsidiaries: Lucha Libre AAA Worldwide (51%); Tapout (50%); WCW Inc. Others
- Website: wwe.com

World Wrestling Entertainment (WWE) is an American professional wrestling promotion. It is the largest and most valuable wrestling promotion in the world and has expanded beyond professional wrestling into film, football, and other business ventures, including the licensing of its intellectual property to other companies to produce video games and action figures. WWE is owned and operated by TKO Group Holdings, a majority-owned subsidiary of the WME Group.

As in other professional wrestling promotions, WWE does not promote a legitimate sporting contest but rather entertainment-based, athletic mock combat performance theater, featuring storyline-driven, scripted, and partially choreographed matches. However, matches often include moves that put performers at risk of serious injury or death if not performed correctly. Beyond the matches, the events also feature melodramatic storylines involving rivalries, alliances, betrayals, and personal conflicts between the wrestlers—developed through scripted segments and used to advance the narratives and promote the matchups. The predetermined nature of professional wrestling was publicly acknowledged by WWE in 1989 to avoid regulation by athletic commissions. WWE markets its product as "sports entertainment", acknowledging professional wrestling's roots in competitive sport and dramatic theater.

The promotion traces its origins to the formation of the Capitol Wrestling Corporation (CWC), founded in 1953 by Jess McMahon or Vincent J. McMahon (Note: The founder of Capitol Wrestling Corporation (CWC) is uncertain. While some sources claim that CWC was founded by Vincent J. McMahon, others claim that Jess McMahon founded the company.) as a Northeastern territory of the National Wrestling Alliance (NWA). Following a booking dispute, CWC left the NWA and rebranded to the World Wide Wrestling Federation (WWWF) in April 1963. The promotion shortened its name to the World Wrestling Federation (WWF) in 1979. In 1982, Titan Sports, founded by Vincent K. McMahon (commonly known as Vince McMahon) and Linda McMahon, acquired the company from Vincent J. McMahon. Under Vince's leadership, the WWF expanded from a regional promotion into the dominant force in professional wrestling and a global entertainment company. The company played a major role in bringing professional wrestling into mainstream popular culture through periods such as the Rock 'n' Wrestling Connection, the Attitude Era, and the development of WrestleMania into the world's largest annual professional wrestling event. Following a trademark dispute with the World Wildlife Fund, the WWF was renamed World Wrestling Entertainment (WWE) in 2002, and adopted the initials WWE as its primary branding in 2011.

WWE's main roster is divided into two touring brands, Raw and SmackDown. Its developmental brands, NXT and Evolve, are based at the WWE Performance Center in Orlando, Florida. The promotion's programming is available in more than one billion homes worldwide in 30 languages and its global headquarters is located in Stamford, Connecticut, with offices in New York, Los Angeles, Mexico City, Mumbai, Shanghai, Singapore, Dubai, and Munich.

In January 2023, WWE began to explore a sale of the company, amid allegations of misconduct involving Vince McMahon, which had previously led to his resignation as chairman and CEO. In September 2023, WWE merged with Zuffa, the parent company of mixed martial arts promotion Ultimate Fighting Championship (UFC), to form TKO Group Holdings, a publicly traded company majority-owned by Endeavor Group Holdings. McMahon initially served as executive chairman of TKO, and WWE's legal name was changed to World Wrestling Entertainment, LLC. In 2024, McMahon resigned from TKO amid a sex trafficking scandal and was replaced as executive chairman by Ari Emanuel.

== Company history ==
=== Capitol Wrestling Corporation (1953–1963) ===
WWE's origins can be traced back as far as the 1950s when on January 7, 1953, the first show under the Capitol Wrestling Corporation (CWC) was produced. There is uncertainty as to who the founder of the CWC was. Some sources state that it was Vincent J. McMahon, while other sources cite McMahon's father Jess McMahon as founder of CWC. The CWC later joined the National Wrestling Alliance (NWA) and famous New York promoter Toots Mondt soon joined the promotion.

Vincent J. McMahon and Toots Mondt acquired control of approximately 70% of the NWA's booking power, largely due to their dominance in the heavily populated Northeastern United States. In 1963, McMahon and Mondt had a dispute with the NWA over "Nature Boy" Buddy Rogers being booked to hold the NWA World Heavyweight Championship. Mondt and McMahon were not only promoters but also acted as his manager and were accused by other NWA promoters of withholding Rogers making defenses in their cities versus only defending in Mondt and McMahon's own cities, thus maintaining a monopoly on the world title. In a now-infamous situation, the NWA sent former five-time world champion and legitimate wrestler Lou Thesz to Toronto to face Rogers on January 24, 1963. Thesz recalls this was not planned and prior to the match remembered telling Buddy "We can do this the easy way or the hard way." Rogers agreed to lose the fall and title in a one fall match versus the traditional two out of three fall matchup that most world title matches were defended. Once word reached back to Mondt and McMahon, at first they simply ignored the title change. From January until April 1963, Rogers was promoted as the NWA World Champion, or simply the World Heavyweight Champion, in their area.

=== World Wide Wrestling Federation (1963–1979) ===
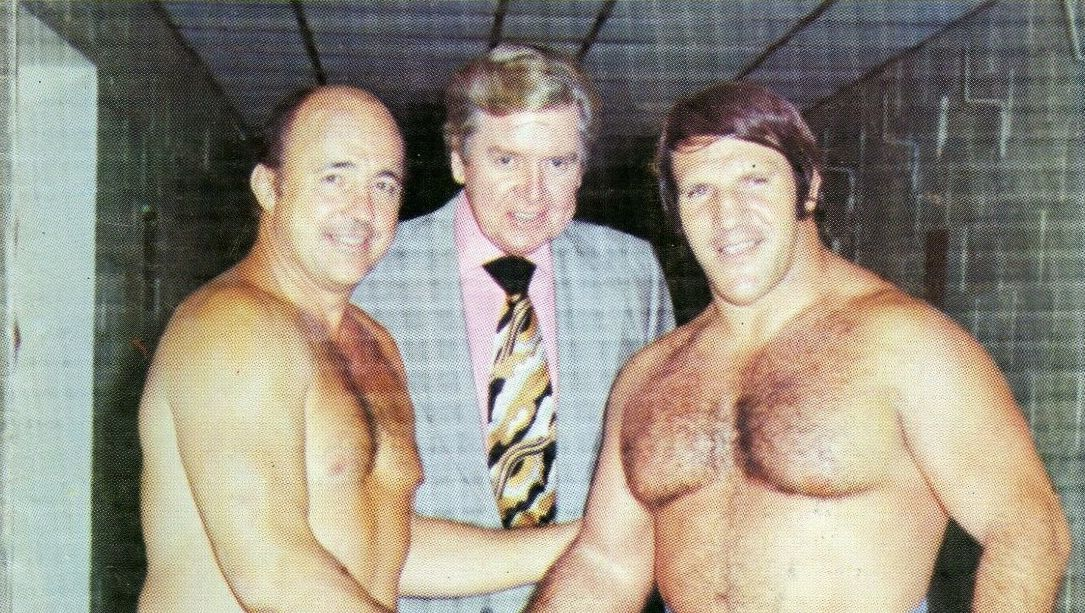
Vincent J. McMahon with Verne Gagne and Bruno Sammartino in 1975

Led by Mondt and McMahon, the CWC withdrew from the NWA in protest. Following this departure, the promotion rebranded as the World Wide Wrestling Federation (WWWF). They were accompanied by Willie Gilzenberg, a longtime boxing and wrestling promoter based in New Jersey. In April 1963, the WWWF World Heavyweight Championship was created, with the promotion claiming that inaugural champion Rogers had won a tournament in Rio de Janeiro on April 25, 1963, defeating long time Capitol favorite Antonino Rocca in the finals. In reality, Rocca was no longer in the area, as he was working for Jim Crockett Sr. in the Carolinas. Rogers also had already suffered what would later be a career ending heart attack on April 18 in Akron, Ohio, and was in an Ohio hospital during the time the alleged tournament took place. Rogers lost the championship to Bruno Sammartino a month later on May 17, with the promotion beginning to be built around Sammartino shortly after.

In June 1963, Gilzenberg was named the first president of the WWWF. Mondt left the promotion in the late 1960s and although the WWWF had previously withdrawn from the NWA, McMahon quietly re-joined in 1971.

=== World Wrestling Federation and Titan Sports (1979–2002) ===
==== Purchase of WWF by Titan Sports (1979–1984) ====
The WWWF was renamed the World Wrestling Federation (WWF) in 1979. In 1980, Vincent J. McMahon's son, Vincent K. McMahon, and his wife Linda established Titan Sports, Inc. in South Yarmouth, Massachusetts, and applied trademarks for the initials "WWF". The company was incorporated on February 21, 1980, in the Cape Cod Coliseum offices, then moved to the building on Holly Hill Lane in Greenwich, Connecticut.

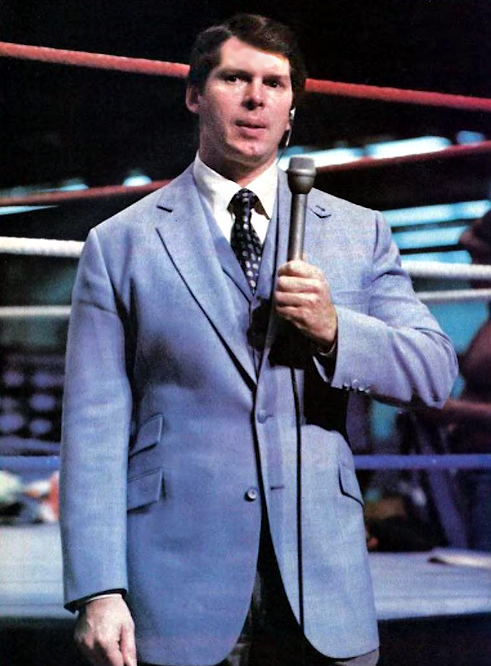
Vincent K. McMahon, former majority owner and executive chairman of WWE, in 1986.

The younger McMahon bought CWC from his father in 1982, effectively seizing control of the company. The actual date of sale is still unknown but the generally accepted date is June 6, 1982; however, this was likely only the date the deal was struck but not finalized. On WWF television, CWC maintained copyrights and ownership past the June 1982 date. The World Wrestling Federation was not solely owned by Vincent J. McMahon but also by Gorilla Monsoon, Arnold Skaaland and Phil Zacko. The deal between the two McMahons was a monthly payment basis, in which if a single payment was missed, ownership would revert to the elder McMahon and his business partners. Looking to seal the deal quickly, McMahon took several loans and deals with other promoters and the business partners (including the promise of a job for life) in order to take full ownership by May or June 1983 for an estimated total of roughly $1 million with the three business partners receiving roughly $815,000 among them and Vincent J. McMahon receiving roughly $185,000. Seeking to make the WWF the premier wrestling promotion in the country, and eventually, the world, he began an expansion process that fundamentally changed the wrestling business.

At the annual meeting of the NWA in 1983, the McMahons and former Capitol employee Jim Barnett all withdrew from the organization. McMahon also worked to get WWF programming on syndicated television all across the United States. This angered other promoters and disrupted the well-established boundaries of the different wrestling promotions, eventually ending the territory system, which was in use since the founding of the NWA in the 1940s. In addition, the company used income generated by advertising, television deals, and tape sales to secure talent from rival promoters. In an interview with Sports Illustrated, McMahon was quoted as saying: "In the old days, there were wrestling fiefdoms all over the country, each with its own little lord in charge. Each little lord respected the rights of his neighboring little lord. No takeovers or raids were allowed. There were maybe 30 of these tiny kingdoms in the U.S. and if I hadn't bought out my dad, there would still be 30 of them, fragmented and struggling. I, of course, had no allegiance to those little lords."

==== Golden Era (1984–1993) ====
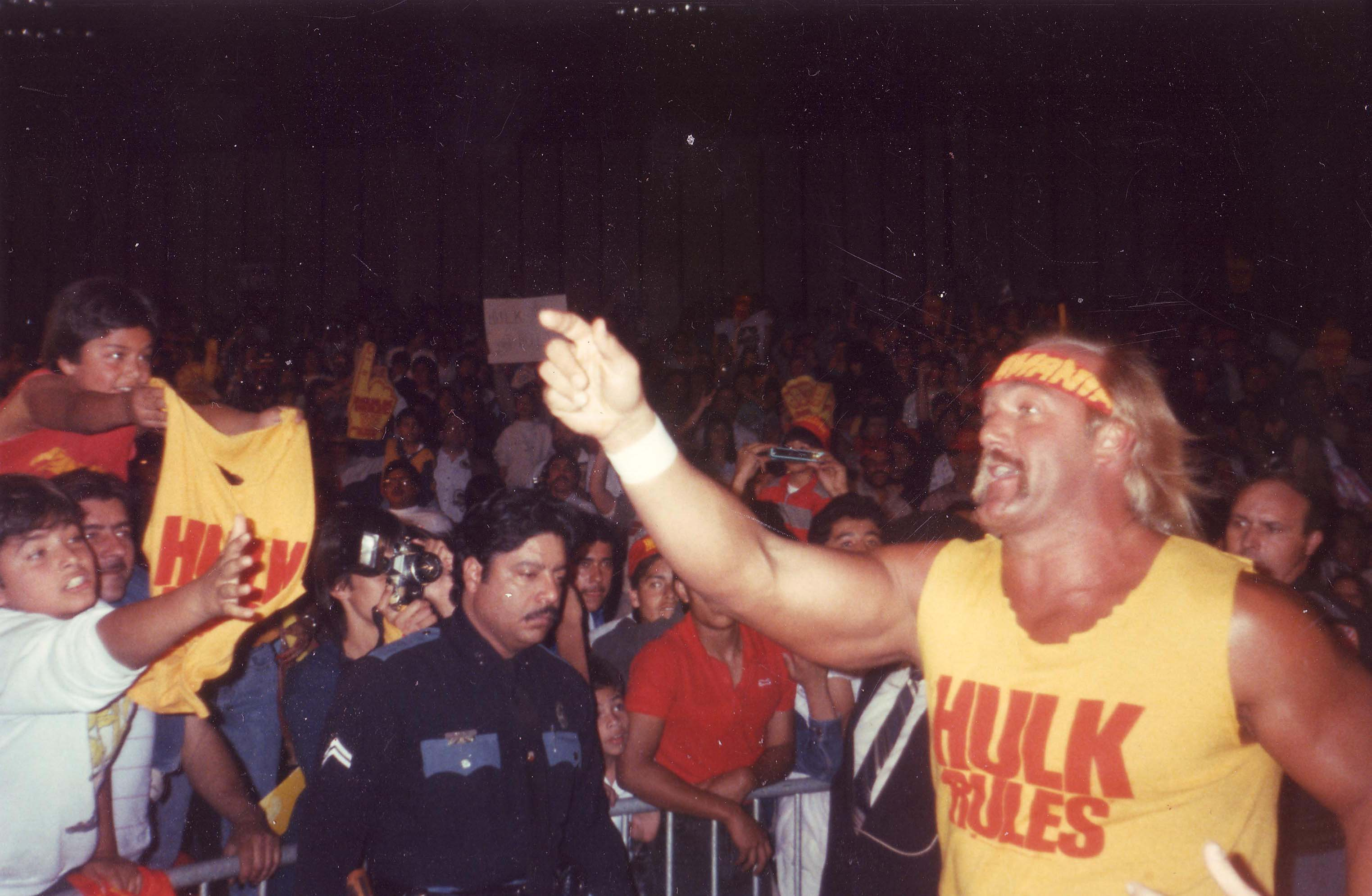
Hulk Hogan, pictured in 1989, was the WWF's top star during the 1980s professional wrestling boom.

McMahon gained significant traction when he hired American Wrestling Association (AWA) talent Hulk Hogan, who had achieved popularity outside of wrestling, notably for his appearance in the film Rocky III (1982). McMahon signed Roddy Piper as Hogan's rival, and then shortly afterward Jesse Ventura as an announcer. Other wrestlers joined the roster, such as The Iron Sheik, Nikolai Volkoff, Junkyard Dog, Paul Orndorff, Greg Valentine, and Ricky Steamboat, joining existing stars such as Jimmy Snuka, Don Muraco, Sgt. Slaughter and André the Giant. Many of the wrestlers who would later join the WWF were former AWA or NWA talent.

The WWF initiated a national tour, a venture requiring massive capital investment that ultimately pushed the promotion to the brink of bankruptcy. The future of McMahon's experiment came down to the success or failure of McMahon's groundbreaking concept, WrestleMania. WrestleMania was a major success and was (and still is) marketed as the Super Bowl of professional wrestling. The concept of a wrestling supercard was nothing new in North America; the NWA had begun running Starrcade a few years prior. In McMahon's eyes, however, what separated WrestleMania from other supercards was that it was intended to be accessible to those who did not watch wrestling. He invited celebrities such as Mr. T, Muhammad Ali, and Cyndi Lauper to participate in the event, as well as securing a deal with MTV to provide coverage. The event and hype surrounding it led to the term Rock 'n' Wrestling Connection, due to the cross-promotion of popular culture and professional wrestling. It has been acknowledged that Lauper and her then boyfriend and manager Dave Wolff, himself a wrestling fan, were among the most instrumental in helping the WWF connect with the MTV audience, with Wolff being considered as the person who engineered the rock 'n' wrestling connection.

The WWF business expanded significantly on the shoulders of McMahon and his babyface hero Hulk Hogan for the next several years after defeating The Iron Sheik at Madison Square Garden on January 23, 1984. This event is often cited as the start of WWF's Golden Era, or "Hulkamania". The introduction of Saturday Night's Main Event on NBC in 1985 marked the first time that professional wrestling had been broadcast on network television since the 1950s when the now-defunct DuMont Television Network broadcast matches of Vincent J. McMahon's Capitol Wrestling Corporation. The 1980s "Wrestling Boom" peaked with the WrestleMania III pay-per-view at the Pontiac Silverdome in 1987, which set an attendance record of 93,173 for the WWF for 29 years until 2016. A rematch of the WrestleMania III main event between WWF champion Hulk Hogan and André the Giant took place on The Main Event I in 1988 and was seen by 33 million people, the most-watched wrestling match in North American television history.

In 1983, Titan moved its offices to Stamford, Connecticut. Subsequently, a new Titan Sports, Inc. (originally WWF, Inc.) was established in Delaware in 1987 and was consolidated with the Massachusetts entity in February 1988.

==== New Generation Era and start of the Monday Night War (1993–1997) ====
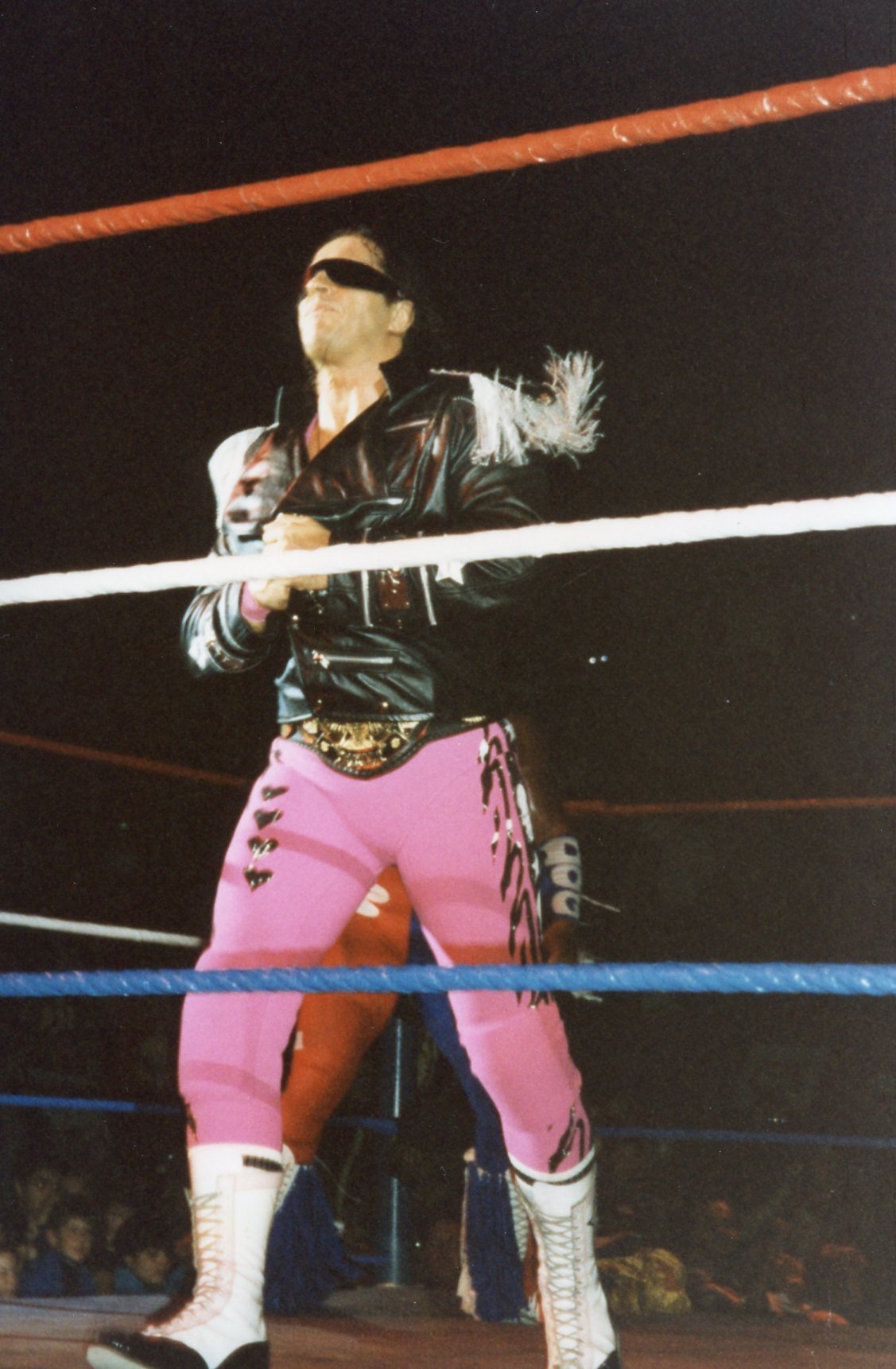
Bret Hart was the biggest star of the New Generation Era and defeated Yokozuna to win back the WWF World Heavyweight Championship in the main event of WrestleMania 10.

The WWF was hit with allegations of steroid abuse and distribution in 1992. This was followed by allegations of sexual harassment by WWF employees the following year. McMahon was eventually exonerated, but the allegations brought bad public relations for the WWF, and an overall bad reputation. The steroid trial cost the company an estimated $5 million at a time of record low revenues. This helped drive many WWF wrestlers over to rival promotion World Championship Wrestling (WCW), including 1980s babyface hero Hulk Hogan. During this period, the WWF promoted wrestlers of a younger age comprising "The New Generation", featuring Bret Hart, Shawn Michaels, Diesel, Razor Ramon and The Undertaker among others in an effort to promote new talent into the spotlight. The election of Bill Clinton as U.S. president in 1992 would also mark the spread of dramatic changes in the American culture as well.

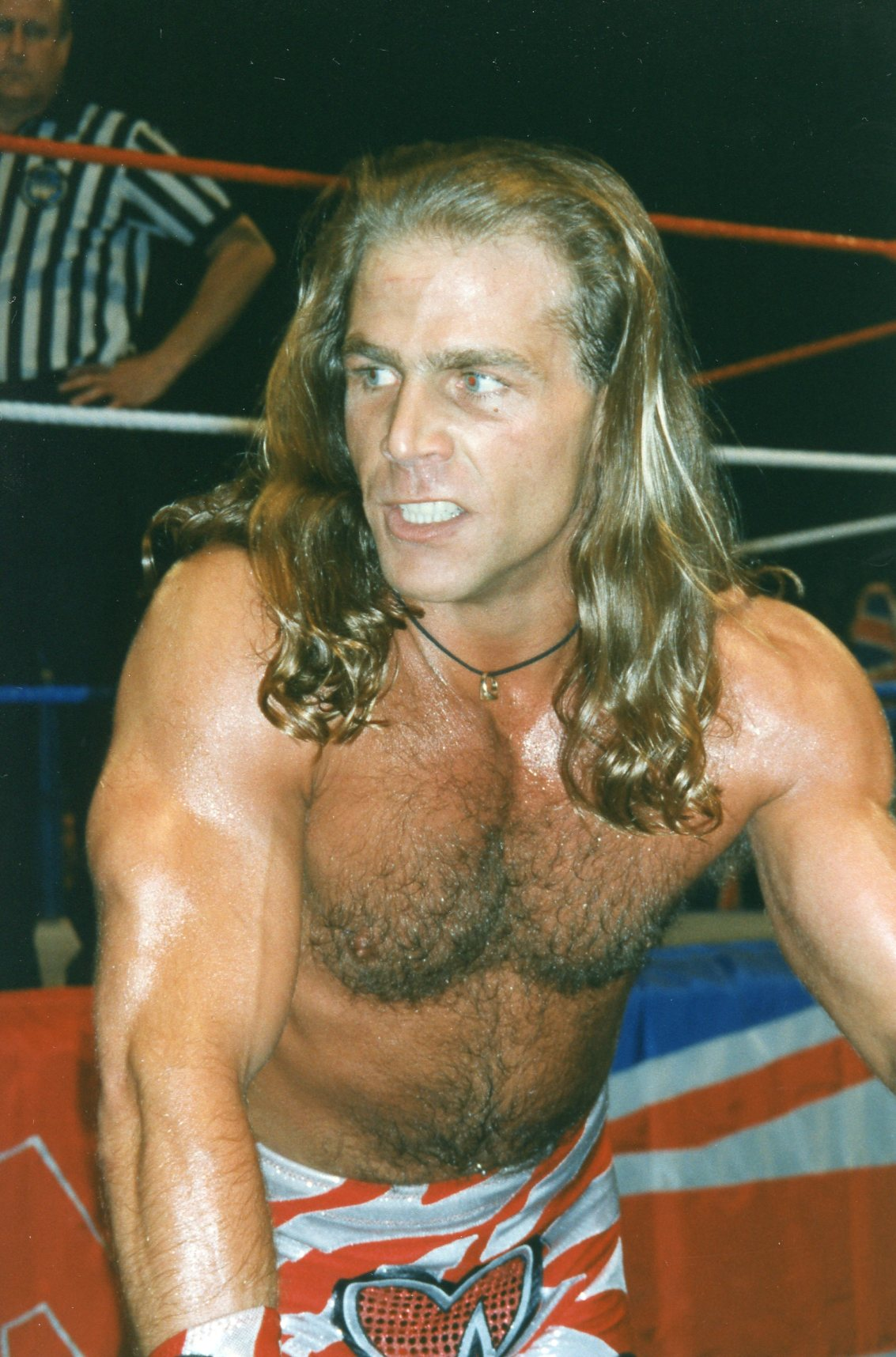
Shawn Michaels became one of the biggest stars in WWF during this time, since an iconic ladder match at WrestleMania X in 1994.

In January 1993, the WWF debuted its flagship cable program Monday Night Raw. WCW countered in September 1995 with its own Monday night program, Monday Nitro, which aired in the same time slot as Raw. The two programs would trade wins in the ensuing ratings competition (known as the "Monday Night War") until mid-1996. At that point, Nitro began a nearly two-year ratings domination that was largely fueled by the introduction of the New World Order (nWo), a stable led by former WWF performers Hulk Hogan, Scott Hall (the former Razor Ramon), and Kevin Nash (the former Diesel).

Towards the end of the New Generation Era, former WCW and Extreme Championship Wrestling (ECW) talent were being hired by the WWF, including Steve Austin (initially under The Ringmaster persona), Brian Pillman, Mankind, and Vader. Adopting the Stone Cold persona, Austin slowly increased in popularity despite being initially promoted as a heel. This started with his "Austin 3:16" speech, shortly after defeating Jake Roberts in the tournament finals at the 1996 King of the Ring pay-per-view. This era also saw the debut of Rocky Maivia, who later adopted the more famous persona of The Rock.

==== Attitude Era, purchase of WCW and ECW, and end of the War (1997–2002) ====
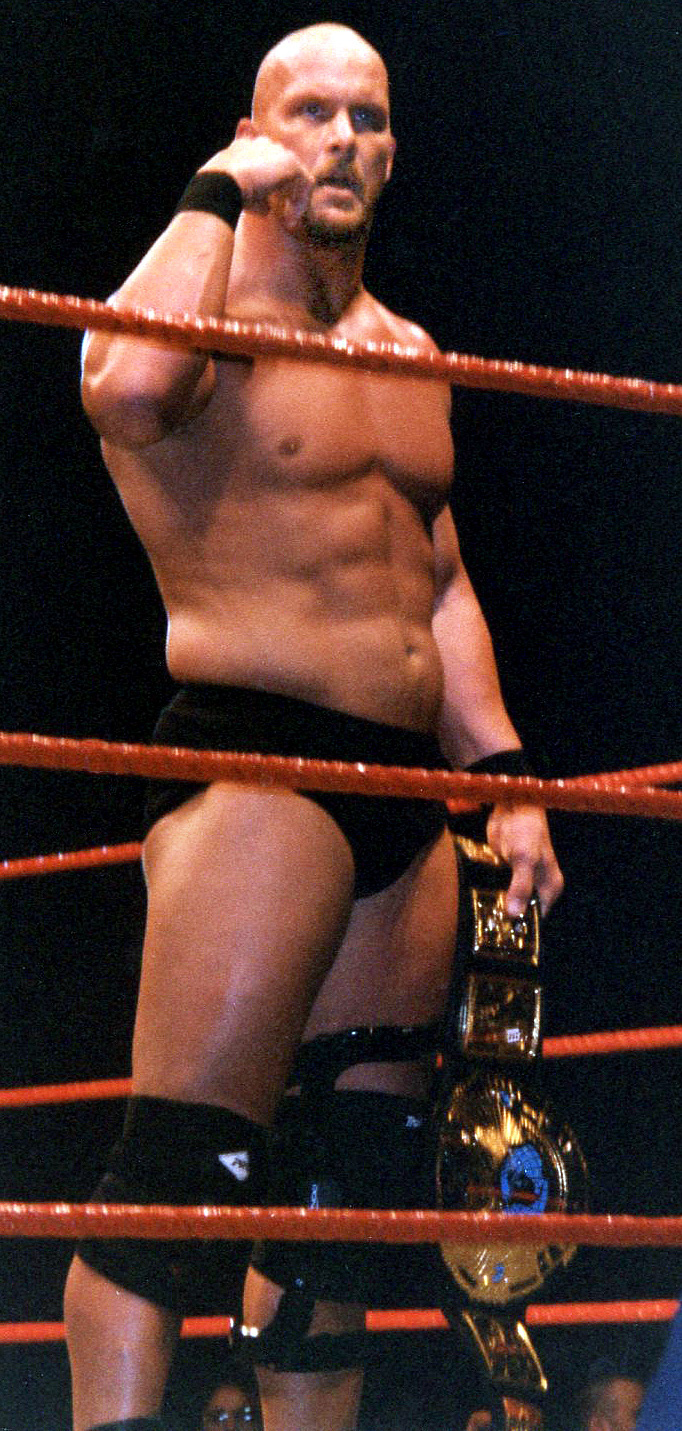
Stone Cold Steve Austin's rivalry with Vince McMahon is often cited as having turned the tides for WWF in the Monday Night War against rival promotion WCW.

As the Monday Night War continued between Raw Is War and WCW's Nitro, the WWF would transform itself from a family-friendly product into a more adult-oriented product, known as the Attitude Era. The era was spearheaded by WWF VP Shane McMahon (son of owner Vince McMahon) and head writer Vince Russo.

1997 ended with McMahon facing real-life controversy following Bret Hart's controversial departure from the company. This was the result of the Montreal Screwjob, which took place at the 1997 Survivor Series. This proved to be one of several factors in the launch of the Attitude Era as well as the creation of McMahon's on-screen character, "Mr. McMahon". Following Hart and Shawn Michaels's departures, Austin became the new face of the company.

In 2022, Vince Russo, who was the lead booker during the early years of the Attitude Era, stated that the USA Network "directly oversaw the WWE product" during he and Ed Ferrera's time with the WWF, with Ferrera actually serving as a USA Network consultant and working with USA Network executive Bonnie Hammer. Shortly before the WWF's television ratings turnaround in early 1998, the USA Network would be acquired by Home Shopping Network head Barry Diller, which, according to Shaun Assael and Mike Mooneyham's book Sex, Lies, and Headlocks: The Real Story of Vince McMahon and World Wrestling Entertainment, resulted in "the terrain" shifting "completely under everyone's feet" and also expanded Hammer's influence at the USA Network. Diller's purchase would also result in efforts to cancel WWF programming on the USA Network in May 1998 being thwarted, with Hammer being among the network executives who was most supportive of the WWF.

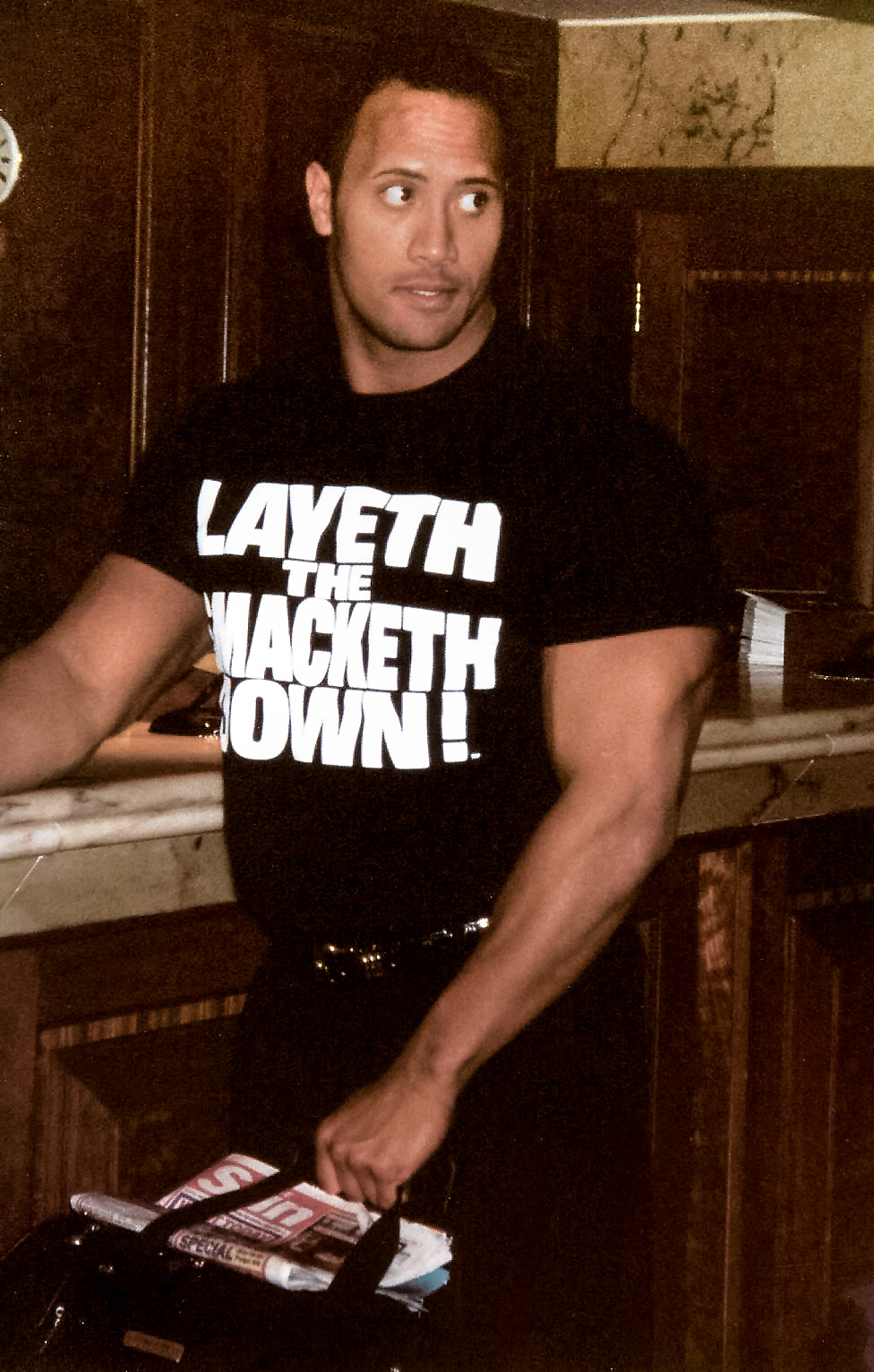
The Rock's popularity in the Attitude Era was fueled by his charisma and speaking abilities, which led to many catchphrases and merchandising opportunities.

In 1998 and 1999, The Rock began to increase in popularity as a rival to Stone Cold Steve Austin, being dubbed as the "People's Champion". On April 29, 1999, the WWF made its return to terrestrial television, airing a special program known as SmackDown! on the fledgling UPN network, named after one of The Rock's catchphrases, "Layeth the smack down". The Thursday night show became a weekly series on August 26, 1999 – competing directly with WCW's Thursday night program titled Thunder on TBS.

In the summer of 1999, Titan Sports, Inc. was renamed World Wrestling Federation Entertainment, Inc. On October 19, 1999, World Wrestling Federation Entertainment, Inc. launched an initial public offering as a publicly traded company, trading on the New York Stock Exchange (NYSE) with the issuance of stock then valued at $172.5 million. The company was traded on the NYSE under ticker symbol WWF, later changed to WWE.

By the fall of 1999, the Attitude Era had turned the tide of the Monday Night War into WWF's favor. After Time Warner merged with America Online (AOL), Ted Turner's control over WCW was considerably reduced. The newly merged company lacked interest in professional wrestling as a whole and decided to sell WCW in its entirety. Although Eric Bischoff, whom Time Warner fired as WCW president in October 1999, was nearing a deal to purchase the company, in March 2001 McMahon acquired the rights to WCW's trademarks, tape library, contracts, and other properties from AOL Time Warner for a number reported to be around $7 million. Shortly after WrestleMania X-Seven, the WWF launched the Invasion storyline, integrating the incoming talent roster from WCW and ECW. With this purchase, WWF now became by far the sole largest wrestling promotion in North America and in the world. The assets of ECW, which had folded after filing for bankruptcy protection in April 2001, were purchased by WWE in 2003.

In 2000, the WWF, in collaboration with television network NBC, launched the XFL, a new professional football league that debuted in 2001. The league had high ratings for the first few weeks, but initial interest waned and its ratings plunged to dismally low levels (one of its games was the lowest-rated prime-time show in the history of American television). NBC walked out on the venture after only one season, but McMahon intended to continue alone. However, after being unable to reach a deal with UPN, McMahon shut down the XFL. WWE maintained control of the XFL trademark before McMahon reclaimed the XFL brand, this time under a separate shell company from WWE, in 2017 with intent to relaunch the XFL in 2020.

=== World Wrestling Entertainment (2002–present) ===
==== Ruthless Aggression Era and first brand split (2002–2008) ====
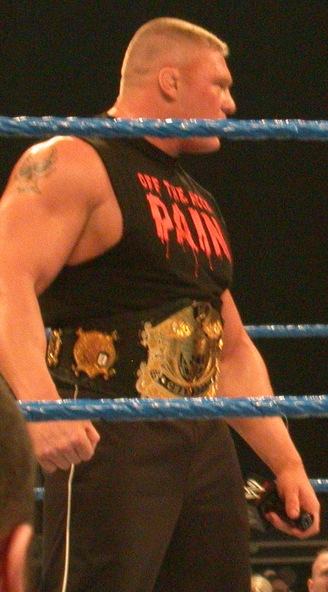
Brock Lesnar became one of the biggest stars of the Ruthless Aggression Era

On May 6, 2002, the World Wrestling Federation (WWF) changed both its company name and the name of its wrestling promotion to World Wrestling Entertainment (WWE) after the company lost a lawsuit initiated by the World Wildlife Fund over the WWF trademark. Although mainly caused by an unfavorable ruling in its dispute with the World Wildlife Fund regarding the "WWF" initialism, the company noted it provided an opportunity to emphasize its focus on entertainment. On a June 24, 2002 episode of Raw, Vince McMahon officially dubbed this era as the "Ruthless Aggression" era.

In March 2002, the WWF had decided to create two separate rosters, with each group of wrestlers appearing on one of their main programs, Raw and SmackDown!, due to the overabundance of talent leftover from the Invasion storyline and the ensuing absorption of WCW and ECW contracts. This was dubbed as the "brand extension". During this time many new and young wrestlers would join the company, many of whom would become household names for the next years to come such as John Cena, Randy Orton, Brock Lesnar, and Batista.

Also beginning in 2002, a draft lottery was held nearly every year to set the rosters, with the first draft to determine the inaugural split rosters, and subsequent drafts designed to refresh the rosters of each show. WWE expanded the brand split by relaunching ECW as a third brand on May 26, 2006.

==== PG Era and brand reunification (2008–2014) ====
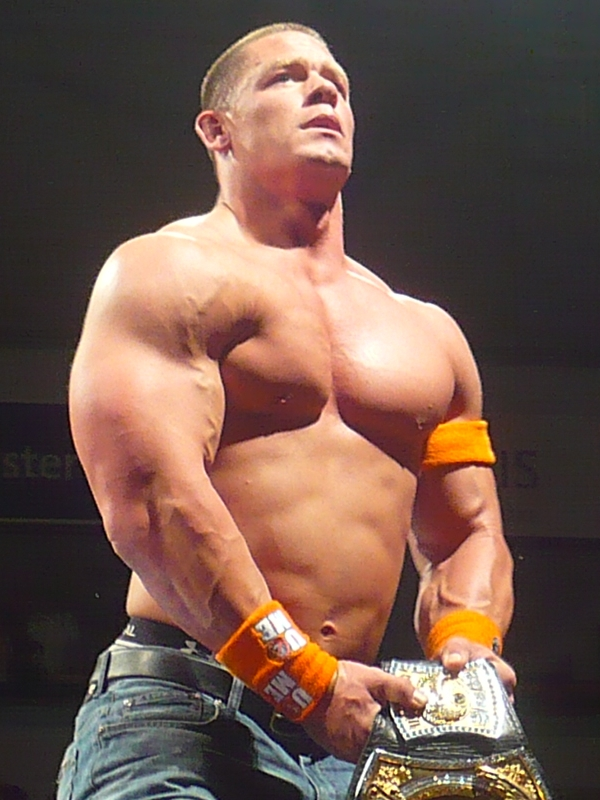
Having gradually risen in the Ruthless Aggression Era, John Cena was the face of WWE during the PG Era. Since 2005, he went on to win a record 17 world championships in the promotion.

On July 22, 2008, WWE adapted a more family-friendly format and their programming received a TV-PG rating, starting the PG Era. The final ECW program aired on February 16, 2010, after which it was replaced with NXT.

On April 7, 2011, WWE officially dropped its full legal name, World Wrestling Entertainment, and transitioned to using its acronym as an orphan initialism. According to a corporate announcement, this rebranding reflected the company's expansion into a global entertainment brand, shifting its primary focus beyond traditional professional wrestling toward television, live events, and film production. WWE noted that their new company model was put into effect with the relaunch of Tough Enough, being a non-scripted program (contrary to the scripted nature of professional wrestling) and with the launch of the WWE Network (at the time scheduled to launch in 2012; later pushed back to 2014). However, the legal name of the company remained as World Wrestling Entertainment, Inc.

Beginning with the August 29, 2011 episode, Raw – referred to as Raw Supershow – featured talent from both Raw and SmackDown (the "Supershow" epithet would be dropped on July 23, 2012). Championships previously exclusive to one show or the other were available for wrestlers from any show to compete for; the "Supershow" format would mark the end of the brand split, as all programming and live events (until July 2016) featured the full WWE roster.

In 2013, the company built the sports medicine and training facility WWE Performance Center in the east Orange County, Florida in partnership with Full Sail University from Winter Park, Florida. The training facility is targeted at career and athletic development for the company's wrestlers. Full Sail is also home base to WWE's NXT brand, which served as a developmental territory for WWE.

==== Reality Era, New Era, and second brand split (2014–2020) ====
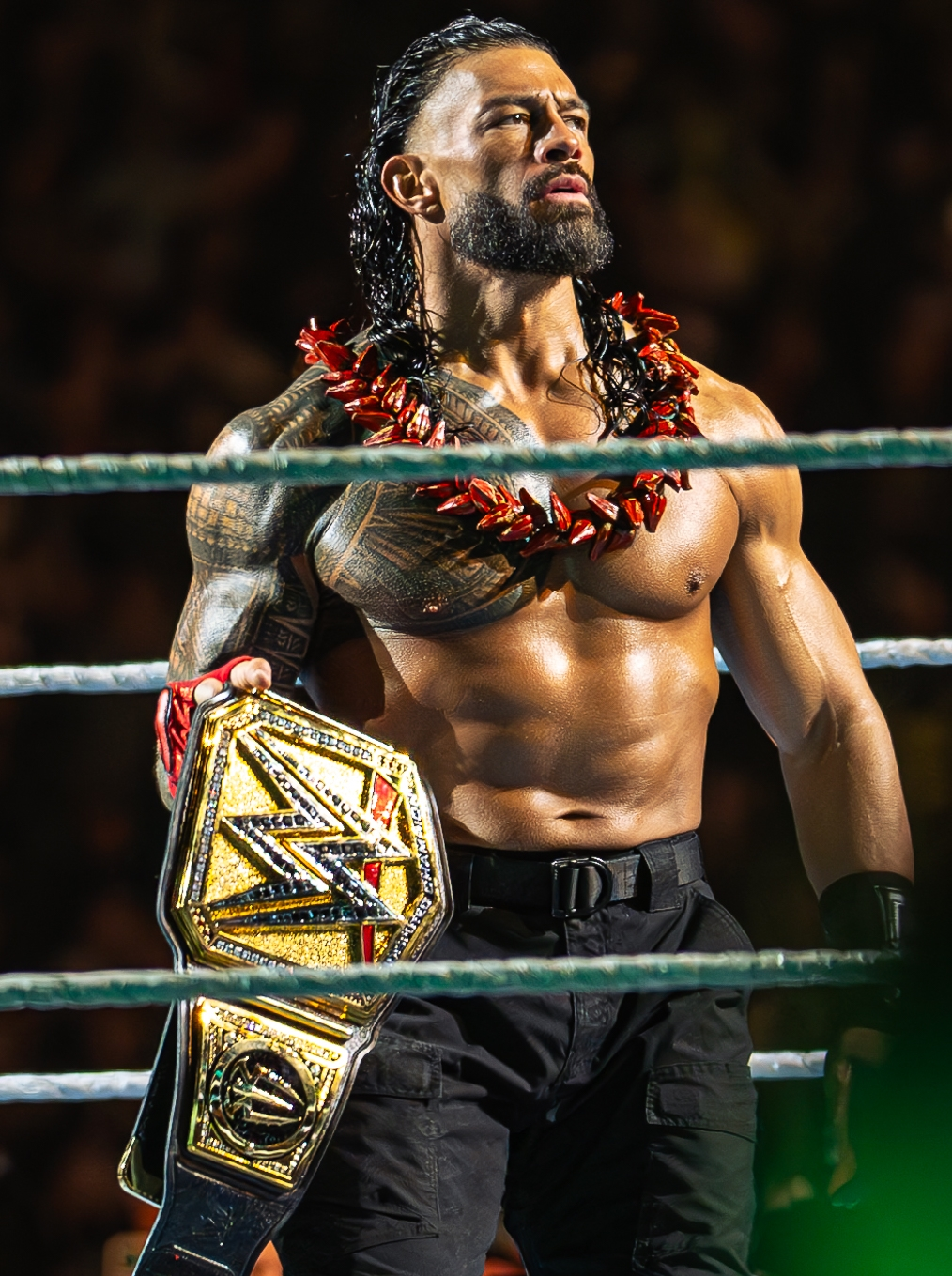
Roman Reigns has been a top star in the WWE since 2015, and at WrestleMania 38 in 2022 he defeated Brock Lesnar to jointly hold the WWE Championship and the WWE Universal Championship as the Undisputed WWE Universal Champion.

On February 24, 2014, WWE launched WWE Network, an over-the-top streaming service that would feature archive content from WWE and its predecessors, all pay-per-views (which would continue to be sold through television providers as well), and original programming. On the March 24 episode of Raw, Triple H would dub that point in time the beginning of the "Reality Era".

Beginning in 2015, WWE started to push Roman Reigns as the face of the company since having him win the 2015 Royal rumble match, amidst mixed reception. By 2017 Roman Reigns became their highest merchandise seller.

Raw and SmackDown have been WWE's two main brands since the brand split was first initiated in 2002 and reinitiated in 2016.

On May 25, 2016, WWE relaunched the brand split, billed as the "New Era". Subsequently, Raw and SmackDown have each featured their unique rosters, announcers, championships and ring sets/ropes. A draft took place to determine which wrestlers would appear on what show. SmackDown also moved from Thursdays to Tuesday nights, which began on July 19 (the night of the aforementioned draft), and airs live instead of the previous pre-recorded format.

Due to the return of the brand split, a new World Championship, called the WWE Universal Championship was introduced at the August 21, 2016 SummerSlam event with Finn Bálor defeating Seth Rollins to become the inaugural WWE Universal Champion.

On November 29, 2016, WWE introduced a new program specifically for their cruiserweight division (wrestlers 205 lbs. and under) called WWE 205 Live. The program focuses exclusively on those wrestlers who qualify for the division. The cruiserweights – who first became a fixture in WWE with the Cruiserweight Classic tournament – were originally exclusive to the Raw brand before landing their own brand.

On December 15, 2016, WWE established a new WWE United Kingdom Championship, with the inaugural champion being decided by a 16-man tournament to air on WWE Network featuring wrestlers from the UK and Ireland during January 2017. WWE executive Paul "Triple H" Levesque said the eventual plan with the new title and tournament was to establish a UK-based brand with its own weekly television show. WWE subsequently launched its UK-based brand as an offshoot of NXT, NXT UK, in June 2018, with Johnny Saint serving as inaugural general manager.

Starting in September 2019, NXT had a weekly, live, two-hour show Wednesday nights on the USA Network and WWE began promoting NXT as their "third brand". However, in 2021 NXT was moved to Tuesday nights, having conceded the Wednesday Night Wars to rival promotion All Elite Wrestling (AEW), and in September of that year was reinstated to its original function as the developmental brand for the main roster (Raw and SmackDown), under the name "NXT 2.0".

==== COVID-19 pandemic and return to touring (2020–2022) ====
In March 2020, WWE began to be impacted by the American onset of the COVID-19 pandemic. In mid-March, three of the four major sports leagues closed locker rooms to the media as a precautionary measure. As other sports cancellations and postponements were being introduced, WWE began to film its weekly programs at the Performance Center without spectators and with only essential staff present, beginning with the March 13 episode of SmackDown – the March 11 episode of NXT had been recorded at the Performance Center with paying fans, thus being WWE's last event to have ticketed fans in attendance before the pandemic took full effect. WrestleMania 36 was scheduled to take place on April 5 at Raymond James Stadium in Tampa but on March 16, was moved to Orlando to be held behind closed doors. WrestleMania, as well as Raw and SmackDown for a period before and after WrestleMania, shifted from live broadcasts to a pre-recorded format. NXT continued to air from Full Sail University, but under similar restrictions.

Live broadcasts returned on April 13, with the existing arrangements continuing; WWE stated to ESPN.com that "we believe it is now more important than ever to provide people with a diversion from these hard times", and that the company's programming "bring[s] families together and deliver a sense of hope, determination and perseverance". It was subsequently reported that Florida Governor Ron DeSantis had deemed WWE a business critical to the state's economy, and had added an exception under the state's stay-at-home order for employees of a "professional sports and media production" that is closed to the public and has a national audience. The decision was met with criticism from media outlets, with several media outlets pointing out that DeSantis' actions happened on the same day a pro-Donald Trump political action committee led by Linda McMahon, who was previously a part of Trump's cabinet, pledged to spend $18.5 million in advertising in Florida, and that, also on the same day, Vince McMahon was named part of an advisory group created by Trump to devise a strategy in re-launching the US economy.

On April 15, WWE started a series of cuts and layoffs in response to the pandemic, including releasing a number of performers (Karl Anderson, Kurt Angle, Aiden English, EC3, Epico, Luke Gallows, Curt Hawkins, No Way Jose, Sarah Logan, Mike Kanellis, Maria Kanellis, Primo, Erick Rowan, Rusev, Lio Rush, Zack Ryder, Heath Slater, and Eric Young), three producers (Dave Finlay, Shane Helms and Lance Storm), referee Mike Chioda, and multiple NXT/Performance Center trainees and staff. WWE executives also took a pay cut, and the company also suspended construction on its new headquarters for at least six months. The firings caused significant backlash by fans; with Business Insider calling them "livid". Both fans and several media outlets pointed out that while WWE claimed that these actions were "necessary due to the economic impact of the coronavirus pandemic", the WWE also claimed to have "substantial financial resources. Available cash and debt capacity currently total approximately $0.5 billion". DeSantis' claimed WWE was "essential", which meant that the company's revenues loss would be limited.

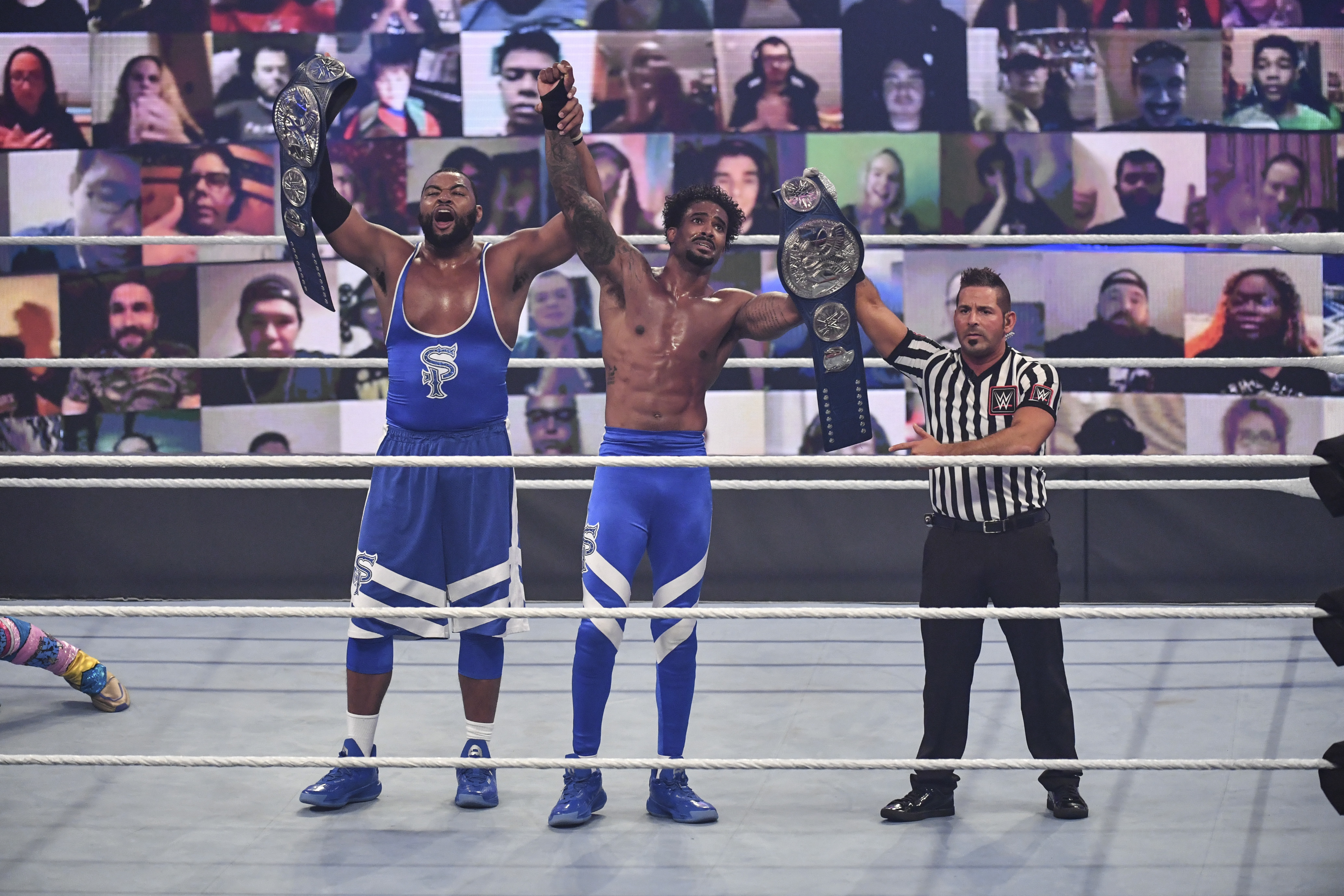
The WWE ThunderDome featured a virtual audience and production environment during the COVID-19 pandemic that allowed WWE to continue broadcasting events with remote fan participation.

In August 2020, WWE relocated from the Performance Center to Orlando's Amway Center for a long-term residency, broadcasting episodes of Raw, SmackDown, and pay-per-views through a virtual fan viewing experience called WWE ThunderDome. Inside the ThunderDome, drones, lasers, pyro, smoke, and projections were utilized to enhance the wrestlers' entrances on a level similar to that of pay-per-view productions pre-pandemic. Nearly 1,000 LED boards were installed to allow for rows and rows of virtual fans. It was free of charge for fans to virtually attend the events, though they had to reserve their virtual seat ahead of time. During this time, Roman Reigns began his historic world title reign with the WWE Universal Championship, which would eventually surpass 1,000 days; being the longest world title reign in the WWE since Hulk Hogan from 1984 to 1988. WWE remained at the Amway Center up through early December before relocating the ThunderDome to Tropicana Field in St. Petersburg, Florida. The ThunderDome relocated to Yuengling Center, located on the campus of the University of South Florida in Tampa, beginning with the April 12, 2021, episode of Raw. In October 2020, NXT events were relocated from Full Sail University to the Performance Center in a similar setup dubbed the Capitol Wrestling Center. It had many of the same features as the ThunderDome, but with a small crowd of select live fans included, in addition to the virtual fans. The name is also an homage to WWE's predecessor, the Capitol Wrestling Corporation. On May 21 WWE brought back fans full time, beginning with a 25-city tour, thus ending the ThunderDome residency. The July 16 episode of SmackDown started WWE's return to the road, taking place at the Toyota Center in Houston, Texas.

In January 2021, WWE moved WrestleMania 37, which was originally to be held in Inglewood, California on March 28, to Raymond James Stadium in Tampa, Florida – WrestleMania 36's original location – as a two-night event on April 10 and 11, with fans in attendance, though to a limited capacity. This marked WWE's first event during the pandemic to have ticketed fans in attendance with a maximum of 25,000 spectators for each night with COVID-19 protocols in place. Also around this time, the WWE Network in the United States became exclusively distributed by Peacock on March 18, 2021 (ahead of Fastlane and WrestleMania 37). The merger of the WWE Network and Peacock did not affect the service outside of the United States. The move to Peacock received some criticisms from fans particularly due to Peacock's heavy censorship policy, the company began the removal of some of the contents that were considered iconic moments of the Attitude Era that were deemed inappropriate by Peacock, these archived contents would no longer be available under any of WWE's authorized platforms. Amdist the criticisms, in April 2021 WWE executive Triple H defended WWE's move to Peacock.

NXT was moved to a Tuesday night timeslot in 2021 and was rebooted as NXT 2.0 later that year, reinstituting its original function as a developmental brand. The Performance Center became NXT's permanent home base, replacing Full Sail. Maximum capacity crowds resumed and the Capitol Wrestling Center name was phased out. In February 2022, the 205 Live brand was dissolved and the 205 Live show was replaced by a new NXT show called Level Up.

On February 24, 2022, WWE launched a partnership with On Location, a company known for providing premium hospitality experiences for marquee events. Through the partnership, spectators will have access to hospitality packages for WWE's five biggest events, including WrestleMania, SummerSlam, Royal Rumble, Survivor Series, and Money in the Bank. The 2022 Money in the Bank was WWE's first event to offer the premium hospitality packages. These ticket and travel packages include premier seating, premium hospitality offerings, and meet-and-greets with current WWE wrestlers and legends.

==== Changes in leadership (2022–2023) ====
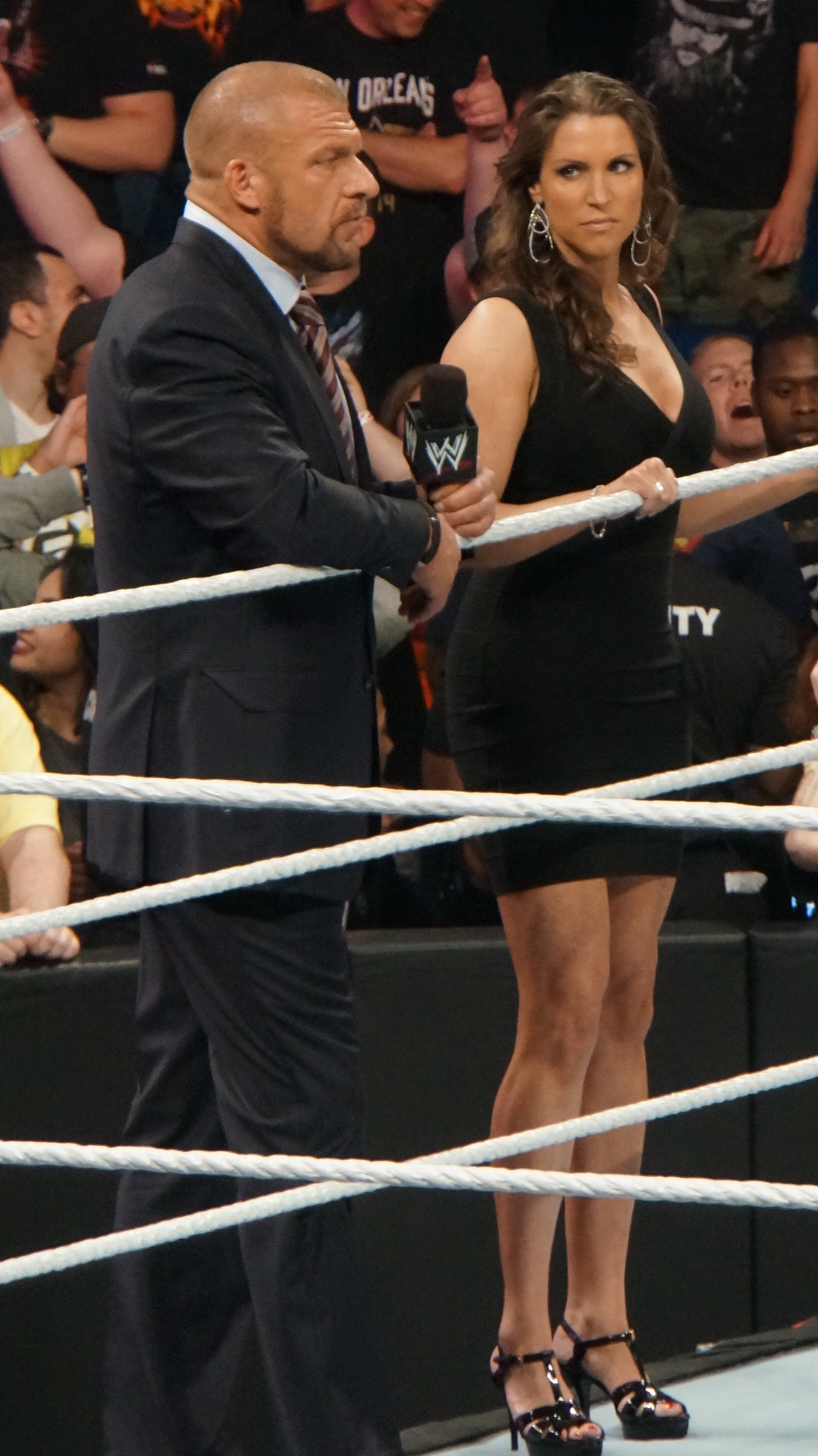
Former WWE Chairwoman and CEO Stephanie McMahon (right) with her husband WWE CCO and Head of Creative Triple H (left)

On June 17, 2022, amidst an investigation by WWE's Board of Directors into reported "hush money" paid to a former employee by Vince McMahon following an affair, Mr. McMahon stepped down as chairman and CEO of WWE and was replaced by his daughter, Stephanie McMahon, as the interim chairwoman of WWE. Despite the change Vince McMahon came out on WWE SmackDown, that night opening the show with a brief speech, the highlights of which "then, now, forever and most importantly together" was quoted by various news media as Vince letting people know that he was still in creative control from behind the scenes. On July 22, 2022, Vince McMahon officially retired, stating on Twitter, "At 77, time for me to retire. Thank you, WWE Universe. Then. Now. Forever. Together." Following Vince's retirement, Stephanie McMahon was officially named chairwoman while she and Nick Khan were named co-CEOs of WWE. Triple H would take over as head of creative, while resuming his position as Executive Vice President of Talent Relations and later being promoted to Chief Content Officer. Commentators have highlighted the significance of McMahon's retirement, saying that it marked the historic start of a new period in WWE's history. The 2022 SummerSlam event held on July 30, 2022, was the first WWE pay-per-view event to be held under the leadership of Stephanie McMahon and Triple H.

On August 18, 2022; WWE Hall of Famer Shawn Michaels was promoted to WWE Vice President of Talent Development Creative. On September 6, 2022, WWE announced Paul 'Triple H' Levesque's promotion to Chief Content Officer. On January 6, 2023, Vince McMahon announced intentions to return to the company ahead of media rights negotiations. WWE's media rights with Fox and USA Network were set to expire in 2024. That same month, JP Morgan were hired to handle a possible sale of the company, with companies such as Comcast (owners of NBCUniversal and long-time partners of WWE), Fox Corp (broadcaster of SmackDown), Disney (owners of ESPN), Warner Bros. Discovery (broadcasters of rival promotion AEW), Netflix, Amazon, Endeavor Group Holdings (owners of UFC), and Liberty Media being in the speculation for buying the company with CAA and Saudi Arabia's Public Investment Fund also on the list. On January 10, 2023, Stephanie McMahon resigned as chairwoman and co-CEO. On the same day Vince McMahon assumed the role of executive Chairman of the WWE while Nick Khan became the sole CEO of the WWE.

==== Acquisition of WWE by Endeavor (2023) ====
On April 3, 2023; WWE and Endeavor reached a deal under which WWE would merge with UFC's parent company Endeavor to form a new company, which would go public on the New York Stock Exchange (NYSE) under the symbol "TKO". Endeavor would hold a 51% stake in "TKO", with WWE's shareholders having a 49% stake, valuing WWE at $9.1 billion. This marked the first time that WWE has not been majority-controlled by the McMahon family. Vince McMahon was appointed to serve as executive chairman of the new entity, Endeavor CEO Ari Emanuel would become CEO, with Mark Shapiro becoming president and chief operating officer. Emanuel would not take on any creative roles with WWE's head of creative Paul Levesque appointed to remain in his role, and with Nick Khan becoming president of WWE post-merger (not unlike Dana White's role as president of UFC). The deal additionally granted McMahon life tenure as executive chairman, the right to nominate five WWE representatives on the 11 member board, as well as veto rights over certain actions by the new company. In addition, McMahon would own 34% of the new company, with a 16% voting interest.

Emanuel stated that this merger would "bring together two leading pureplay sports and entertainment companies" and provide "significant operating synergies". Vince McMahon stated that "family businesses have to evolve for all the right reasons", and that "given the incredible work that Ari and Endeavor have done to grow the UFC brand—nearly doubling its revenue over the past seven years—and the immense success we've already had in partnering with their team on a number of ventures, I believe that this is without a doubt the best outcome for our shareholders and other stakeholders."

==== Merger with UFC and the formation of TKO Group Holdings (2023–present) ====
The logo of TKO Group Holdings

The merger between WWE and UFC into TKO Group Holdings (TKO) was completed on September 12, 2023. Although the company's legal name remained World Wrestling Entertainment, LLC, it remained united with UFC as part of the new entity "TKO". As part of the deal WWE and UFC remained separate divisions of the new entity featuring Professional Wrestling and Mixed martial arts respectively. The first WWE show under the Endeavor regime was the September 12, 2023, episode of NXT which opened with Ilja Dragunov defeating Wes Lee in a singles match, and in the main event Becky Lynch defeated Tiffany Stratton to win the NXT Women's Championship. The first WWE pay per view under TKO was NXT No Mercy on September 30, 2023. Popular wrestler CM Punk returned to WWE in late 2023 and in his first match upon return he defeated Dominik Mysterio at WWE MSG Show on December 26, 2023.

On January 23, 2024 Dwayne Johnson, also known as "The Rock" joined the TKO Group Holdings board of directors. Three days later on January 26 Vince McMahon once again resigned due to further sexual misconduct allegations, with Ari Emanuel obtaining greater control as the new Chairman of TKO.

On April 1, 2024, Triple H stated that WWE had entered "another era". The next day, before WrestleMania XL, TKO's parent company, Endeavor was taken private by its largest investor, Silver Lake, a year after Endeavor's three-year run as a public company where Endeavor purchased WWE a year prior. On April 3, WWE wrestler Cody Rhodes coined the term "Renaissance Era" for the period. At WrestleMania XL, the WWE would officially debut a new signature intro ahead of the event's first match. Paul "Triple H" Levesque would introduce the fans in attendance, "Welcome to a new time, welcome to a new era," and at the WrestleMania's second night Stephanie McMahon would reiterate this, referring to it as the "Paul Levesque era". On April 7, in the main event of the second and final night of the event, Cody Rhodes defeated Roman Reigns to win the Undisputed WWE Universal Championship.

On January 23, 2024, WWE announced an agreement with Netflix, which would include Raw moving from USA Network to the platform worldwide, and Netflix acquire the rights to all of WWE's weekly programs, live events, and library content outside of the United States. On May 4, 2024, WWE held Backlash France, their first ever pay-per-view event in France. On October 29, WWE announced WWE ID, a new talent development system incorporating partnerships with independent promotions and wrestling schools.

In 2024, WWE began a wider talent exchange between Total Nonstop Action Wrestling (TNA) and its NXT brand. A multi-year partnership was officially announced on January 16, 2025. WWE also formed partnerships with Pro Wrestling Noah and Dream Star Fighting Marigold.

The current logo used for Saturday Night's Main Event since 2024

In 2024, after having moved from USA Network to Fox in 2019, Smackdown returned to USA Network as part of a five-year agreement with NBCUniversal. As part of the agreement, it was stated that WWE would produce four prime time specials for NBC per-year for the length of the agreement. On September 17, 2024, WWE announced that it would be producing a second revival of Saturday Night's Main Event, with the first episode airing on December 14 from Nassau Coliseum—the site of the first edition of the series and marking the return of WWE programming to the network since the 2014 edition of Tribute to the Troops.

On April 19, 2025, during the WrestleMania 41 pre-show, WWE announced its intent to acquire the Mexican promotion Lucha Libre AAA Worldwide in conjunction with Fillip, a Mexican sports and entertainment company. The sale closed in the third quarter of 2025.

In July 2026, WWE announced a partnership with SiriusXM to rebrand its wrestling-oriented sports talk station Pro Wrestling Nation 24/7 as WWE Radio. As part of the agreement, the channel will carry radio play-by-play broadcasts of WWE's major events beginning at SummerSlam (with Vic Joseph and Booker T on commentary), WWE's official podcasts, and ancillary coverage of WWE events. The channel will continue to carry existing programs such as Busted Open and Cheap Heat Live, although Thunder Rosa was pulled from the host rotation of the former due to being signed to AEW.

== Championships and accomplishments ==
Note: Tables with a "Days rec." column means that WWE officially recognizes a different number of days that a wrestler has held a title, generally due to an event airing on tape delay.

The colors and symbols indicate the home brand of the champions.

†	Raw	‡	SmackDown	§	NXT	+	Evolve	*	ID	∞	Unaffiliated

=== Main roster ===
==== Raw ====
Raw
Championship	Current champion(s)	Reign	Date won	Days held	Location	Notes	Ref.
World Heavyweight Championship	Roman Reigns	1	April 19, 2026	215	Paradise, Nevada	Defeated CM Punk at WrestleMania 42 Night 2.	
Women's World Championship	Liv Morgan	4	October 10, 2026	41	New Orleans, Louisiana	Defeated previous champion Stephanie Vaquer and Becky Lynch in a triple threat match at Money in the Bank.	
WWE Intercontinental Championship	Ethan Page	1	November 2, 2026	18	Brooklyn, New York	Defeated Chad Gable on Raw.	
WWE Women's Intercontinental Championship	Iyo Sky	1	November 16, 2026	4	Raleigh, North Carolina	Defeated Raquel Rodriguez on Raw.	
World Tag Team Championship	Penta and Je'Von Evans	1	November 7, 2026	13	Riyadh, Saudi Arabia	Defeated The Vision (Bron Breakker and Austin Theory) at Crown Jewel.	

==== SmackDown ====
SmackDown
Championship	Current champion(s)	Reign	Date won	Days held	Location	Notes	Ref.
Undisputed WWE Championship	Sami Zayn	2	September 11, 2026	70	Azcapotzalco, Mexico City, Mexico	Defeated CM Punk on SmackDown.	
WWE Women's Championship	Tiffany Stratton	2	November 7, 2026	13	Riyadh, Saudi Arabia	Defeated Chelsea Green in Stratton's Money in the Bank cash-in match at Crown Jewel.	
WWE United States Championship	Trick Williams	2	September 6, 2026	75	Atlanta, Georgia	Defeated Baron Corbin at Sunday Night's Main Event.	
WWE Women's United States Championship	Jacy Jayne	1	August 14, 2026	98	Boston, Massachusetts	Defeated Tiffany Stratton on SmackDown.	
WWE Tag Team Championship	The MFTs (Tama Tonga and Talla Tonga)	1 (3, 1)	August 14, 2026	98	Boston, Massachusetts	Defeated previous champions Damian Priest and R-Truth and The War Raiders (Erik and Ivar) in a triple threat tag team match on SmackDown.	

==== Open ====
Open
Championship	Current champion(s)	Reign	Date won	Days held	Location	Notes	Ref.
AAA World Cruiserweight Championship	Rey Fénix	2	May 30, 2026	174	Monterrey, Nuevo León, Mexico	Defeated Laredo Kid at Noche de Los Grandes. On the September 28, 2026, episode of WWE Raw, reigning champion Rey Fénix announced that the title would now be open to all brands under WWE, with the champion able to defend the title on any show.	
WWE Women's Tag Team Championship	Michin and B-Fab	1	October 23, 2026	28	Ontario, California	Defeated Alexa Bliss and Tatum Paxley on SmackDown.	

=== Developmental ===
==== NXT ====
NXT
Championship	Current champion(s)	Reign	Date won	Days held	Location	Notes	Ref.
NXT Championship	Grayson Waller	1	August 30, 2026	82	Edinburg, Texas	Defeated previous champion Tony D'Angelo, Cruz Montana, and Zilla Fatu in a fatal four-way match at Heatwave.	
NXT Women's Championship	Kelani Jordan	1	August 30, 2026	82	Edinburg, Texas	Defeated Kendal Grey at Heatwave.	
NXT North American Championship	Jackson Drake	1	August 30, 2026	82	Edinburg, Texas	Defeated Myles Borne at Heatwave.	
NXT Women's North American Championship	Zaria	1	June 9, 2026	164	Orlando, Florida	Defeated Tatum Paxley on NXT.	
NXT Tag Team Championship	The Vanity Project (Brad Baylor and Ricky Smokes)	2	August 30, 2026	82	Edinburg, Texas	Defeated Myles Borne and Tavion Heights at Heatwave.	

==== Evolve ====
Evolve
Championship	Current champion(s)	Reign	Date Won	Days held	Days rec.	Location	Notes	Ref.
WWE Evolve Men's Championship	Harlem Lewis	1	June 19, 2026	154	128	Orlando, Florida	Defeated Aaron Rourke on Evolve. WWE recognizes Lewis' reign as beginning on July 15, 2026, when the episode aired on tape delay.	
WWE Evolve Women's Championship	Nikkita Lyons	1	May 29, 2026	175	149	Orlando, Florida	Defeated Wendy Choo at Evolve: Succession III. WWE recognizes Lyons's reign as beginning on June 24, 2026, when the episode aired on tape delay.	

==== WWE ID ====
WWE ID
Championship	Current champion(s)	Reign	Date won	Days held	Location	Notes	Ref.
WWE ID Championship	Max Abrams	1	June 26, 2026	147	Atlanta, Georgia	Defeated Chazz "Starboy" Hall at The Nightmare Factory's event, The ID Showcase.	
WWE Women's ID Championship	Monica Monroe	1	October 3, 2026	48	Texas City, Texas	Defeated Laynie Luck at Reality of Wrestling's event, Rise of Wrestling Royalty, also earning a WWE ID contract.	

== Contracts ==
WWE signs most of its talent to exclusive contracts, meaning talent can appear or perform only on WWE programming and events. They are not permitted to appear or perform for another promotion unless special arrangements are made beforehand. WWE keeps all wrestlers' salary, employment length, benefits, and all other contract details strictly private.

WWE classifies its professional wrestlers as independent contractors and not as employees. A study by the University of Louisville Law Review found that after applying the Internal Revenue Service (IRS) 20-factor test, 16 factors "clearly indicate that wrestlers are employees". However, as a result of WWE terming them as independent contractors, "the wrestlers are denied countless benefits to which they would otherwise be entitled".

In December 2021, WWE revealed a new recruitment contract for athletes who are currently attending college. The NCAA-approved name, image, and likeness contracts are referred to by WWE as "next in line agreements".

== Stock and corporate governance ==
On October 19, 1999, WWF, which had been owned previously by parent company Titan Sports, launched an initial public offering as a publicly traded company, trading on the New York Stock Exchange (NYSE) with the issuance of stock then valued at $172.5 million. The company traded on the NYSE under ticker symbol WWE.

The company has actively marketed itself as a publicly traded company through presentations at investor conferences and other investor relations initiatives. In June 2003, the company began paying a dividend on its shares of $0.04 per share. In June 2011, the company cut its dividend from $0.36 to $0.12. In 2014, concerns about the company's viability caused wide fluctuations in its share price.

In September 2023, Endeavor Group Holdings, UFC and WWE formed a new publicly traded company, TKO Group Holdings, Inc. The new entity went public on September 12, 2023, and is listed on the New York Stock Exchange (NYSE) under the symbol "TKO".

At the close of the deal, Endeavor held a 51% stake in TKO Group Holdings, with WWE's shareholders having a 49% stake, valuing WWE at $9.1 billion. This marked the first time that WWE had not been majority-controlled by members of the McMahon family. Endeavor CEO Ari Emanuel became CEO of TKO and Mark Shapiro became president and chief operating officer, with each maintaining their respective roles at Endeavor. UFC and WWE continued to operate as separate divisions under TKO, with Dana White as CEO of the UFC and Nick Khan serving as president of WWE post-merger. WWE's head of creative Paul Levesque remained in his role.

== WWE Network and distribution deals ==
On February 24, 2014, WWE launched WWE Network, an over-the-top subscription streaming service The service, which was initially proposed as a linear pay television service, carried all WWE pay-per-view events, original programming (including in-ring programs, as well as documentary and reality programming highlighting the promotion and its history), and access to WWE library content such as classic pay-per-views and television episodes from WWE and other promotions that it had acquired. The service reached 1,000,000 subscribers on January 27, 2015, in less than one year of its launch, with WWE claiming that it was thus "the fastest-growing digital subscription service ever".

In May 2014, WWE and NBCUniversal renewed their television rights agreement, keeping Raw on the USA Network and SmackDown on Syfy. In January 2016, SmackDown would change networks to the USA Network. The contract with NBCUniversal expires in 2019. On November 17, 2016, WWE and Sky Deutschland signed a multi-year agreement to distribute WWE's premier pay-per-view events and broadcast Raw and SmackDown Live on SKY Sports starting in April 2017. On April 10, 2017, WWE and DAZN, made Raw and SmackDown available live in Japan with Japanese commentary. On April 27, WWE and TV5, reached a new agreement to broadcast one-hour editions of SmackDown. On May 12, WWE and Saran Media, reached a new multi-year agreement to televise Raw and SmackDown. On July 10, WWE and AB 1, extended their partnership into its 18th year with a new, multi-year agreement to broadcast WWE programming. On July 20, WWE and SuperSport, reached a new, multi-year agreement to broadcast WWE programming live for the first time in more than 50 countries. On August 1, WWE and Foxtel extended their partnership into its 18th year with a new agreement to broadcast WWE programming. On August 8, WWE and Canal 1 reached an agreement to broadcast one-hour editions of Raw and SmackDown. On August 16, WWE and Nine Network reached a broadcast agreement to air weekly one-hour versions of Raw and SmackDown. On August 24, WWE and Flow reached a multi-year agreement to televise WWE's flagship programmes Raw and SmackDown. On September 7, WWE and TVA Sports reached a multi-year agreement to air a weekly, one-hour only edition of Raw, in French in Canada. On October 24, WWE and Sport TV reached a multi-year agreement to air Raw and SmackDown. On December 15, WWE and IB SPORTS, they will extend their partnership with a new agreement to broadcast WWE programming live for the first time in South Korea. On December 18, WWE and SPS HD, reached an agreement to broadcast Raw and SmackDown on SPS Sports for the first time in Mongolia.

On December 13, 2017, WWE announced a live in-ring event series for Facebook Watch—the Mixed Match Challenge—which featured a single-elimination tournament involving mixed tag teams formed from the Raw and SmackDown rosters.

In January 2021, WWE announced an agreement with NBCUniversal to move its streaming library and live events to its recently launched streaming service Peacock in the United States beginning on March 18, 2021 (ahead of Fastlane and WrestleMania 37), resulting in the phase-out of WWE Network in the region. On September 9, 2022, WWE renewed its agreement with Foxtel, with WWE Network similarly being folded into its Binge streaming service beginning in January 2023, and WWE programming continuing to air on both Fox8 and a new WWE linear channel on the platform.

On January 23, 2024, WWE announced an agreement with Netflix, under which WWE Raw would move to the platform globally in January 2025, and Netflix would acquire the international rights to WWE's weekly programs, live events, and library content outside of the United States—replacing WWE Network and its individual agreements with other streaming services as they expire.

On August 6, 2025, WWE announced an agreement with ESPN Inc., under which it will hold the rights to its live events in the United States beginning in September 2025, succeeding Peacock. The events air on the "ESPN Unlimited" OTT service, with selected events also slated to air on ESPN's cable channels. ESPN had an existing media rights relationship with fellow TKO Group subsidiary UFC, which expired in favor of one with Paramount in 2026; the agreement did not include U.S. rights to WWE's library content, which were later acquired by Netflix in January 2026. In April 2026, ESPN announced a sublicensing agreement with The CW under which ESPN Unlimited will carry all CW Sports programming; this also includes WWE NXT and NXT live events.

=== Broadcasts ===
In-ring program	Original release	Network(s)	Notes
WWE Raw	January 11, 1993–present	Netflix	One of WWE's two flagship programs Airs on Mondays on Netflix in the U.S.
WWE SmackDown	April 29, 1999–present	USA Network	One of WWE's two flagship programs Airs on Fridays on the USA Network in the U.S.
WWE NXT	February 23, 2010–present	The CW	One of WWE's two developmental wrestling programs Airs on Tuesdays on The CW in the U.S.
WWE Evolve	March 5, 2025–present	Tubi	One of WWE's two developmental wrestling programs Airs on Wednesdays on Tubi in the U.S.
Lucha Libre AAA	January 17, 2026–present	YouTube	Flagship program of WWE's Mexican subsidiary Lucha Libre AAA Worldwide; Airs on Saturdays on YouTube in the U.S.
WWE Main Event	October 3, 2012–present	Rumble	A supplementary program for WWE Raw and WWE SmackDown; Airs on Wednesdays on Rumble in the U.S.
WWE LFG	February 16, 2025–present	A&E	WWE's reality competition program Airs seasonally on A&E in the U.S.
Saturday Night's Main Event	May 11, 1985–present	Peacock	Quarterly streaming television specials that air on select Saturdays on Peacock in the U.S.
Premium Live Events	March 31, 1985–present	ESPN; The CW	Major standalone events that air on ESPN (main roster) and The CW (NXT) once per month in the U.S. Formerly referred to by WWE as Pay-Per-View Events and WWE Network Events

== Terminology ==
WWE uses a variety of special terms in promoting their product, such as describing the wrestling industry as sports entertainment. The fan base is referred to as the "WWE Universe" for the main roster shows, while for NXT shows, they are also referred to as the "NXT Universe". Main roster wrestlers are designated "WWE Superstars", while those in NXT are also referred to as "NXT Superstars". Retired wrestlers are described as "WWE Legends", while those who have been inducted into the WWE Hall of Fame are called "Hall of Famers".

== Expansion beyond wrestling ==
=== Subsidiaries ===
==== Active ====
- TSI Realty Co. (1997–present): In 1997, WWE established a real estate brokerage and investment firm called TSI Realty Company.
- WWE Books (2002–present): A book series that often publishes biographies of WWE personalities, behind-the-scenes guides to WWE, illustrated books, calendars, young adult books, and other nonfiction books.
- WCW Inc. (2001–present): A subsidiary that was originally created as W. Acquisition Company in 2000. It was renamed WCW Inc. in 2001 following the WWF's purchase of the rights to the video library and intellectual property for World Championship Wrestling.
- WWE Legacy Department (2001–present): A collection of professional wrestling videos and copyrights.
- WWE Studios (2002–present): Formerly known as WWE Films, a subsidiary that creates and develops feature film properties, including scripted, non-scripted, family and animated television and digital content.
- WWE Music Group (2006–present): A music group that specializes in compilation albums of WWE wrestlers' entrance themes. The group also releases titles that have been performed by WWE wrestlers.
- WWE Jet Services, Inc. (2013–present): A subsidiary formed to manage the financing and operations of the company's fleet of private jets.
- WWE Performance Center (2013–present): A subsidiary that serves as the usual training center for future WWE wrestlers.
- WWE Podcast Network (2019–present): A podcast network that features several WWE wrestlers hosting their own podcasts. WWE partnered with Endeavor Audio to launch the network.
- Lucha Libre AAA Worldwide (2025–present): A Mexican Lucha Libre promotion.
- WWE Radio (2026–present) : A radio station on SiriusXM airing WWE theme radio shows, podcasts and WWE PLEs.

==== Defunct ====
- Alpha Entertainment (2018): A limited liability company that was established in 2018 by Vince McMahon for the purpose of being the parent company of the new XFL. While McMahon stated that the XFL would remain as a separate company from WWE, it was revealed through WWE's 2018 10-K that the company hold a minority stake in Alpha Entertainment.
- World Bodybuilding Federation (1990–1992): A subsidiary of Titan Sports which promoted professional bodybuilding through a television show, magazine, and annual pay-per-view events.
- Radio WWF (1993): A syndicated radio station hosted by Jim Ross and Johnny Polo. The station featured shows that would cover ongoing WWF storylines and behind the scenes incidents. Radio WWF hosts also provided commentary for two pay-per-views.
- Wrestle Vessel (1996–1999): A series of WWF-themed cruise ship experiences.
- WWE Home Video (1997–2023): A home video subsidiary that specialized in distributing VHS, DVD, and Blu-ray Disc copies of WWE pay-per-view events, compilations of WWE wrestlers' performances and entrances, and biographies of WWE performers. WWE Home Video releases were discontinued worldwide on December 26, 2023.
- WWF Racing (2000): WWF sponsored an NHRA Funny Car team. The partnership was branded WWF Racing. WWF Racing branding was featured at WWE's Wall Street event.
- XFL (2000–2001): A partially owned subsidiary of the WWF which comprised eight league-owned professional football teams. The league included television broadcasts on NBC (the other co-owners of the league), UPN, and TNN.
- The World Entertainment (1999–2003): A subsidiary of World Wrestling Federation/Entertainment that operated a restaurant, nightclub, and memorabilia shop in New York City. World originally opened as "WWF New York", and was renamed "The World". Hard Rock Cafe took over the location in 2005.
- WWE Niagara Falls (2002–2011): a partnership with Canadian Niagara Hotels for a retail store and amusement complex located in Niagara Falls, Ontario, Canada. The store featured occasional autograph signings and appearances by WWE wrestlers, alumni, and Hall of Famers.
- WWE Classics on Demand (2004–2014): A subscription video-on-demand service which featured archived programming, including from subsidiaries World Championship Wrestling, Extreme Championship Wrestling, and others. Classics offered around 40 hours of rotating programming per month, arranged into four programming buckets, and often centered on a specific theme.
- WWE Kids (2008–2014): A website and comic set aimed at children. WWE Kids' comics were produced bi-monthly.
- WWE Universe (2008–2011): A social media website which was managed and operated by WWE. Its original name was "WWE Fan Nation" and was renamed "WWE Universe".
- WWE Magazine (1983–2014): WWE's magazine – originally released bi-monthly, it later switching to a monthly schedule, before being discontinued in 2014.
- WWE Shop (2015–2024): An online store for licensed WWE-related apparel, gear, and other merchandise and products. In 2024, this was outsourced to Fanatics, Inc.

=== Investments ===
- Tout: A social media 15-second video service. In 2012, WWE invested $5,000,000 and entered into a two-year partnership. Stephanie McMahon was named a part of the Tout Board of Directors. The agreement between the two companies ended in 2014.
- Marvel Experience: Marvel Experience is an interactive live event with Marvel characters appearing. WWE invested in the experience in 2013.
- Phunware: A business that creates mobile apps. WWE invested in Phunware in 2014 and uses the company for their app.
- FloSports: An over-the-top sport streaming service that WWE originally invested into in 2016. In 2019, WWE once again invested into FloSports. The sports that are available in FloSports include amateur wrestling, professional wrestling, track, grappling, mixed martial arts, boxing, softball, gymnastics, basketball, tennis, volleyball, cheerleading, and eSports.
- Avid Technology: A technology and multimedia company. Avid specializes in audio and video; specifically digital non-linear editing systems, management and distribution services. WWE invested in Avid in 2016.
- Drone Racing League: A league that contains remote-controlled lightweight aircraft races and appears as a spectator sport. WWE invested in Drone in 2017.
- Cloud9: An esports organization, which has teams compete in many different video games including a WWE sponsor, Rocket League. WWE invested in Cloud9 in 2017.
- DraftKings: WWE's fantasy sports partner.
- Rad: A company that has a streaming platform focusing on non-fungible token technology for film, TV, and celebrities. WWE invested in Rad in 2021.
- Jomboy Media: A multimedia company that produces a baseball show. WWE invested in Jomboy Media in 2022.
- Premier Lacrosse League: A professional lacrosse league in the United States and Canada. WWE invested in the Premier Lacrosse League in 2022.

=== Charities ===
- WWE has had a partnership with the Make-A-Wish Foundation that spans four decades. Multi-time WWE champion John Cena has granted more wishes than any other celebrity in history, having completed his 500th wish in August 2015.
- WWE has had a partnership with the United Service Organizations since the early 2000s. The partnership allows WWE to host WWE Tribute to the Troops around the world and provide tickets to WWE events to service members.
- In 2011, WWE launched its anti-bullying campaign, Be A S.T.A.R (Show Tolerance and Respect). The campaign, targeted towards children, consists of an interactive ceremony with WWE wrestlers visiting children at their schools and lecture the children on bullying.
- Since 2012, WWE has partnered with Susan G. Komen for the Cure to raise awareness of breast cancer during the month of October. Their partnership includes offering special charity-related wrestler merchandise, as well as adding a pink color scheme to the sets and ring ropes; 20% of all October purchases of WWE merchandise go to the organization.
- Since 2012, WWE has partnered with Hire Heroes USA to donate and implement a veterans hiring initiatives through WWE's partners. Multiple times a year, WWE hosts a panel for companies and veterans to come together and discuss career opportunities.
- In June 2014, Connor's Cure – a non-profit charitable organization – was established by Triple H and Stephanie McMahon, who have personally funded it through the Children's Hospital of Pittsburgh Foundation. It is named in honor of Pittsburgh native Connor Michalek (October 17, 2005 – April 25, 2014) who had died two months earlier from medulloblastoma, a rare tumor that affects the brain and spinal cord. Beginning in 2015, WWE began recognizing September as Pediatric Cancer Awareness Month, adding a gold color scheme to the sets and ring ropes, and offering special Connor's Cure merchandise, with the proceeds going to charity.
- Since 2014, WWE has partnered with the Special Olympics.
- Since 2016, WWE has partnered with Boys & Girls Clubs of America.
- In October 2018, a week before the Evolution pay-per-view, the WWE and the United Nations Foundation's Girl Up created Sports for a Purpose program aiming to create a culture of sports participation for girls around the world. The program launched in fall 2019. Stephanie McMahon stated, "WWE is proud to partner with Girl Up to create Sports for a Purpose, a new program designed to help our youth achieve gender equality in sports. Playing sports has a positive impact on girls' leadership skills, confidence and self-esteem, and we are excited to work with Girl Up to create this meaningful program."
- Since 2019, WWE has partnered with Leukemia & Lymphoma Society to drive awareness and support for the research of leukemia.
- Since November 2021, WWE has partnered with National Medal of Honor Museum Foundation, honoring Medal of Honor recipients. Funds are raised through ticket sales.

=== Relationship with Tapout ===
In March 2015, WWE joined forces with Authentic Brands Group to relaunch Tapout, formerly a major MMA-related clothing line, as a more general "lifestyle fitness" brand. The apparel, for men and women, was first released in spring of 2016. WWE markets the brand through various products, including beverages, supplements, and gyms. WWE will hold a 50% stake in the brand, and so will advertise it regularly across all its platforms, hoping to give it one billion impressions a month, and take some of the fitness market from Under Armour. WWE wrestlers and staff have been shown wearing various Tapout gear since the venture began.

== Partnerships ==
Though an infrequent occurrence, during its history WWE has worked with other wrestling promotions in collaborative efforts.

During the 1970s to early 1990s, WWF had working relationships with the Japanese New Japan Pro-Wrestling (NJPW), Universal Wrestling Federation (UWF), Universal Lucha Libre (FULL), and the Mexican Universal Wrestling Association (UWA). These working relationships led to the creations of the WWF World Martial Arts, Light Heavyweight and Intercontinental Tag Team championships.

During the period of 1992–1996, WWF had talent exchange agreements with the United States and Japanese independent companies Smokey Mountain Wrestling (SMW), Super World of Sports (SWS), WAR, and the United States Wrestling Association (USWA).

In 1997, the company did business with Mexico's AAA promotion, bringing in a number of AAA wrestlers for the Royal Rumble event and namesake match.

In 1997, WWF would also do business with Japan's Michinoku Pro Wrestling (MPW), bringing in MPW talent to compete in the company's light heavyweight division and in their 1997 Light Heavyweight Championship tournament.

From 1997 to 1998, WWF partnered with the National Wrestling Alliance (NWA), with WWF hosting NWA matches on its programming. These matches were presented as part of "an invasion" of WWF by NWA wrestlers.

In 2015, WWE entered a partnership with Evolve – a U.S. independent promotion that WWE used as a scouting group for potential signees for the NXT brand. In 2020, WWE would purchase Evolve for an undisclosed amount.

In 2016, WWE partnered with England's Progress Wrestling with Progress hosting qualifying matches for WWE's Cruiserweight Classic. In 2017, Progress talent would participate in the WWE United Kingdom Championship Tournament and at WWE's WrestleMania Axxess events. Three years later in 2020, Progress programming began airing on the WWE Network. Their partnership ended in January 2023 as both companies pursued different digital media strategies.

In 2017, WWE partnered with Scotland's Insane Championship Wrestling (ICW) with some ICW talent appearing in the WWE United Kingdom Championship Tournament and at WWE's WrestleMania Axxess events. In 2017, WWE explored a deal to bring ICW programming onto the WWE Network – ICW programming began airing on the WWE Network in 2020. This partnership ended in January 2023 as both companies pursued different digital media strategies.

In 2018, WWE partnered with Germany's Westside Xtreme Wrestling (wXw). In October 2018, WWE hosted German tryouts at the wXw Wrestling Academy. In 2020, wXw programming began airing on the WWE Network. Their partnership ended in May 2024 when wXw's deal with WWE expired.

In February 2023, WWE (specifically their NXT brand) launched a partnership with the Texas-based independent promotion Reality of Wrestling (ROW), which is owned by WWE Hall of Famer and NXT commentator Booker T.

In December 2023, WWE launched a partnership with All Japan Pro Wrestling (AJPW). In early 2024, WWE expanded their partnership with AJPW, with NXT wrestler Charlie Dempsey going to Japan to challenge for AJPW's Triple Crown Heavyweight Championship which marked the first match under the new collaboration. The partnership ended in late 2024 due to an exclusive deal between CyberAgent (the parent company of Pro Wrestling Noah) and WWE, which affected AJPW's ability to work with WWE.

Throughout 2024, WWE launched partnerships with Dream Star Fighting Marigold (Marigold), Pro Wrestling Noah (NOAH), and Game Changer Wrestling (GCW).

In October 2024, WWE launched the WWE ID system to develop and support the training of independent wrestlers, with the first WWE ID partner wrestling schools and promotions being Black and Brave Academy, Nightmare Factory, Elite Pro Wrestling Training Center, and KnokX Pro Academy, among others.

In January 2025, WWE announced a multi-year partnership with Total Nonstop Action Wrestling (TNA) that allows TNA wrestlers and NXT wrestlers to appear on NXT events, TNA Impact!, and select WWE and TNA Premium Live Events.

Throughout the company's history, WWE has had past arrangements with independent companies from the contiguous United States (such as Ohio Valley Wrestling) and Puerto Rico (such as the International Wrestling Association) with the companies serving as developmental territories.

== Drug testing and wellness program ==
The World Wrestling Federation had a drug-testing policy in place as early as 1987, initially run by an in-house administrator. In 1991, wrestlers were subjected to independent testing for anabolic steroids for the first time. The independent testing ceased in 1996, being deemed too expensive as the company was going through financial duress at the time as a result of their competitors, World Championship Wrestling, being so overwhelmingly more popular and hurting the federation's business.

The Talent Wellness Program is a comprehensive drug, alcohol, and cardiac screening program initiated in February 2006, three months after the sudden death of one of their highest-profile and most popular talents, Eddie Guerrero, who died at 38-years-old. The policy tests for recreational drug use and abuse of prescription medication, including anabolic steroids. Under the guidelines of the policy, talent is also tested annually for pre-existing or developing cardiac issues. The drug testing is handled by Aegis Sciences Corporation; the cardiac evaluations are handled by New York Cardiology Associates P.C. The Wellness Policy requires that all talent "under contract to WWE who regularly perform in-ring services as a professional sports entertainer" undergo testing; however, part-time competitors are exempt from testing.

After the double-murder and suicide committed by one of its performers, Chris Benoit, with a possible link to steroid abuse encouraged by WWE, the United States House Committee on Oversight and Government Reform requested that WWE turn over any material regarding its talent wellness policy.

In August 2007, WWE and its contracted performers defended the program in the wake of several busts of illegal pharmacy that linked WWE performers to steroid purchases even after the policy was put into place. Ten professional wrestlers were suspended for violating the Wellness Policy after reports emerged they were all customers of Signature Pharmacy in Orlando, Florida. According to a statement attributed to WWE attorney Jerry McDevitt, an eleventh wrestler was later added to the suspension list.

On September 13, 2010, WWE updated their list of banned substances to include muscle relaxers.

== Legal disputes and controversies ==
=== 1990s drug scandal ===
During the 1980s and 1990s, George Zahorian was thought to have routinely distributed steroids and other drugs to WWF wrestlers, supposedly with the approval of WWF owner Vince McMahon. In 1993, McMahon was indicted in federal court after the steroid controversy engulfed the promotion, forcing him to temporarily cede control of the WWF to his wife Linda. The case went to trial in 1994, where McMahon himself was accused of distributing steroids to his wrestlers. One notable prosecution witness was Nailz (real name: Kevin Wacholz), a former WWF performer who had been fired after a violent confrontation with McMahon. Nailz testified that McMahon had ordered him to use steroids, but his credibility was called into question during his testimony as he repeatedly stated that he "hated" McMahon. The jury would later acquit McMahon of the charges and he resumed his role in the day-to day operations of the WWF.

=== 1990s ring boy scandal ===
During the early 1990s, Mel Phillips, WWF's ring announcer and ring crew head, was accused of molesting multiple "ring boys", under-aged children that worked as part of the WWF ring crew. In 1992, Phillips was fired from the WWF. Phillips had previously been temporarily dismissed from the WWF in 1988 for sexual misconduct, but was brought back that same year.

On October 29, 2020, it was reported by Business Insider that Vince McMahon and his wife Linda were aware of the allegations against Phillips but willfully turned a blind eye to them. According to Freedom of Information Act requests for court records regarding the ring boy scandal, Vince, under oath, stated that he was aware that Phillips had taken a "peculiar and unnatural interest in children" but refused to take action against him. Further testimony revealed that Vince, after bringing Phillips back to the WWF in 1988, had made Phillips promise to "stop chasing after kids". It was also reported by Business Insider that, under Vince and Linda McMahon's directive, the WWF began a campaign to discredit Tom Cole, one of the children who had accused Phillips of sexual misconduct, and Cole's family. In response to the Business Insider report, Jerry McDevitt, WWE's attorney, stated that the accusations against Phillips were related to his unusual "foot fetish" but did not include "anything approximating conventional forms of sexual abuse such as rape, sodomy, etc." He additionally described the claims that the McMahons knew about the accusations against Phillips but refused to take action and continued to employ him under the condition that he "stop chasing after kids" as "outlandish" and "classic libel".

Tom Cole died in February 2021.

=== Disputes with rival companies ===
In 1996, Titan Sports, the parent company of the World Wrestling Federation, sued World Championship Wrestling (WCW) over WCW implying that Scott Hall and Kevin Nash (Razor Ramon and Diesel) were invading WCW on the WWF's behalf. This led to a series of lawsuits filed by both companies as the Monday Night War heated up. The lawsuit went on for years, ending with a settlement in 2000. One of the terms gave then WWF the right to bid on WCW's assets if the company were liquidated. AOL Time Warner, the then-parent company of WCW, canceled WCW's television shows in March 2001 and sold the company assets to the WWF.

On May 23, 2012, Total Nonstop Action Wrestling (TNA) sued former employee Brian Wittenstein and WWE. The suit alleged that Wittenstein violated a non-disclosure agreement and shared confidential information with the WWE which represented a comparative advantage in negotiating with wrestling talent under contract with TNA. He was subsequently hired by WWE, after which TNA asserted that Wittenstein violated the agreement by downloading confidential TNA trade secrets and providing that information to WWE. Although WWE fired Wittenstein and alerted TNA officials as to the disclosure of the information, TNA claimed that WWE had access to the information for three weeks prior to disclosure and in this time, the WWE used secret contract information and attempted to poach their talent in violation of Tennessee's Uniform Trade Secrets Act. The lawsuit was formally withdrawn without prejudice, by the plaintiff, TNA, on January 15, 2013, under a "Notice of Voluntary Nonsuit" which offers no ruling on the merits of the suit and allows TNA to potentially refile at a later date.

On January 11, 2022, Major League Wrestling (MLW) filed an anti-trust lawsuit against WWE, accusing them of interfering in television and streaming deals and poaching talent. Through the lawsuit, it was disclosed that a streaming deal with Fox Corporation-owned Tubi was terminated due to WWE allegedly threatening to pull their programming from the sibling Fox broadcast network. The suit also alleges that WWE pressured Vice TV to withdraw from negotiations with MLW.

=== Owen Hart's death ===
On May 23, 1999, Owen Hart fell to his death in Kansas City, Missouri, during the Over the Edge pay-per-view event in a stunt that went wrong. WWF broke kayfabe by having television commentator Jim Ross repeatedly tell those watching live on pay-per-view that what had just transpired was not a wrestling angle or storyline and that Hart was hurt badly, emphasizing the seriousness of the situation. While several attempts to revive him were made, he died from his injuries. The cause of death was later revealed to be internal bleeding from blunt force trauma. The WWF management controversially chose to continue the event. Later, Jim Ross revealed Hart's death to the home viewers during the pay-per-view, but not to the crowd in the arena. While the show did go on, it has never been released commercially by WWF Home Video. In 2014, fifteen years after his death, the WWE Network aired the event for the first time. A small photo tribute is shown before the start informing fans that Hart died during the original broadcast. All footage of Hart was edited out of the event. The statement reads: "In Memory of Owen Hart May 7, 1965 – May 23, 1999 who accidentally passed away during this broadcast." Four weeks after the event, the Hart family sued the WWF over how dangerous and poorly planned the stunt was, and over the harness system being defective. After over a year and a half into the case, a settlement was reached on November 2, 2000, which saw the WWF give the Hart family US$18 million.

=== Dispute with USA Network ===
In April 2000, USA Networks, Inc., the parent company of USA Network, had filed a lawsuit against World Wrestling Federation Entertainment Inc. in a bid to keep Raw is War and all WWF programming after the WWF opened up a bidding war a month prior. Viacom's proposed bid included a $30-million to $50-million equity investment in the company and carriage on broadcast, billboards and radio of both wrestling matches along with the then-launched XFL.

On June 27, 2000, the Delaware Supreme Court ruled in favor of the WWF. The next day, Viacom won the rights to all WWF programming for $12.6 million including Raw is War on TNN/Spike TV, a revamped Sunday Night Heat on MTV and retained SmackDown! on UPN after the merger with CBS in 1999. The lawsuit centered on USA's contention that it did not have to match every aspect of a Viacom offer to satisfy a right of first refusal clause in its contract that allowed its deal with the WWF to continue. In 2005, WWE's programming (excluding SmackDown!) moved back to USA Network (now owned by NBCUniversal) and maintains its relationship to this day.

=== WWF name dispute ===
In 1994, Titan Sports had entered into an agreement with the World Wide Fund for Nature (also trademarked WWF), an environmental organization, regarding Titan's use of the "WWF" acronym, which both organizations had been using since at least March 1979. Under the agreement, Titan had agreed to cease using the written acronym "WWF" in connection with its wrestling promotion, and to minimize (though not eliminate) spoken uses of "WWF" on its broadcasts, particularly in scripted comments. In exchange, the environmental group (and its national affiliates) agreed to drop any pending litigation against Titan, and agreed not to challenge Titan's use of the full "World Wrestling Federation" name or the promotion's then-current logo.

In 2000, the World Wide Fund for Nature sued World Wrestling Federation Entertainment Inc. in the United Kingdom, alleging various violations of the 1994 agreement. The Court of Appeal agreed that the promotion company had violated the 1994 agreement, particularly in regards to merchandising. The last televised event to market the WWF logo was the UK-based pay-per-view Insurrextion 2002. On May 5, 2002, the company launched its "Get The F Out" marketing campaign and changed all references on its website from "WWF" to "WWE", while switching the URL from WWF.com to WWE.com. The next day, the official name change from World Wrestling Federation Entertainment, Inc. to World Wrestling Entertainment, Inc., was publicized in a press release and during a broadcast of Raw, from the Hartford Civic Center.

Following the name change, the use of the WWF "scratch" logo became prohibited on all WWE properties. Additionally, past references to the WWF trademark and initials in 'specified circumstances' became censored. Despite the litigation, WWE was still permitted use of the original WWF logo, which was used from 1979 through 1994 and had been explicitly exempted under the 1994 agreement, as well as the similar "New WWF Generation" logo, which was used from 1994 through 1998. Furthermore, the company could still make use of the full "World Wrestling Federation" and "World Wrestling Federation Entertainment" names without consequence. In 2003, WWE won a limited decision to continue marketing certain classic video games from THQ and Jakks Pacific that contained the WWF "scratch" logo. However, the packaging on those games had all WWF references replaced with WWE.

Starting with the 1,000th episode of Raw in July 2012, the WWF "scratch" logo is no longer censored in archival footage due to WWE reaching a new settlement with the World Wide Fund for Nature. In addition, the F in WWF initials are no longer censored when spoken or when written in plain text in archival footage. Since then, full-length matches and other segments featuring the WWF initials and "scratch" logo have been added to the WWE website and the WWE Classics on Demand and eventually the WWE Network service. This also includes WWE Home Video releases since October 2012, starting with the re-release of Brock Lesnar: Here Comes The Pain. Although the WWF initials and logo are no longer censored in archival footage, WWE cannot use the WWF initials or logo in any new, original footage, packaging, or advertising.

=== Harry Slash and the Slashtones lawsuit ===
Harry "Slash" Grivas and Roderick Kohn filed a lawsuit against WWE in June 2003 due to the music being used for its programming and DVDs without consent or payment. It also asserted a violation of the rights to original music used by ECW that WWE had been using during the Invasion storyline of 2001. The case was resolved on both sides with a settlement that saw WWE purchase the catalog outright in January 2005.

=== Ultimate Warrior-related disputes ===
In 1993, Jim Hellwig, known in the WWF as "Ultimate Warrior", legally changed his name to the mononym Warrior. This one-word name appears on all legal documents pertaining to Warrior, and his children carry the Warrior name as their legal surname. Warrior and the WWF engaged in a series of lawsuits and legal actions in 1996 and 1998, where both parties sought a declaration that they owned the characters, Warrior and Ultimate Warrior, under both contract and copyright law. The court ruled that Warrior was legally entitled to use the gimmick, costuming, face paint designs, and mannerisms of the "Warrior" character.

On September 27, 2005, WWE released a DVD documentary focusing on Warrior's retrospective wrestling career, titled The Self-Destruction of the Ultimate Warrior. The DVD featured clips of his more notable feuds and matches along with commentary from WWE stars past and present (most of which are unflattering). The DVD has provoked some controversy due to Warrior's allegations of libel by WWE against him. Originally, Warrior was asked to help with the production of the DVD, but as he refused to work with WWE, there had been some resulting animosity between Warrior and WWE over the Warrior claiming bias on the part of WWE. In January 2006, Warrior filed another lawsuit against WWE in an Arizona court over the depiction of his wrestling career in The Self-Destruction of the Ultimate Warrior DVD. On September 18, 2009, Warrior's lawsuit in Arizona was dismissed.

Warrior returned to WWE to be inducted into the Hall of Fame. During his induction, he mentioned that WWE should create an award to honor those behind the scenes called the Jimmy Miranda Award, named after a long time WWE employee who died. Warrior died three days after being inducted into the WWE Hall of Fame. WWE decided to create the Warrior Award, an award for people "who embodied the spirit of the Ultimate Warrior." The award was later given to Connor Michalek (a child who died from cancer), Joan Lunden (a journalist who was diagnosed with cancer), and Eric LeGrand (a former college football player who became a quadriplegic after an in-game injury). In October 2017, WWE used the tagline "Unleash Your Warrior" when promoting Breast Cancer Awareness Month. Since Warrior's death, WWE has been accused of whitewashing and ignoring Warrior's bigoted and controversial past comments. Pro Wrestling Torch described Warrior in real-life having made public "vile, bigoted, hateful, judgmental comments", citing as an example that regarding Bobby Heenan's cancer diagnosis, Warrior said, "Karma is just a beautiful thing to behold." Vice wrote that "completely whitewashing his past and elevating his likeness to a bland symbol of corporate altruism is shockingly tone-deaf, especially for a company that's at least outwardly trying to appear progressive, inclusive and diverse."

=== Morals clause violations ===
Under Section 9.13(a) of WWE's booking contract, commonly known as the "morals clause", the company has a zero-tolerance policy involving domestic violence, child abuse and sexual assault. Upon arrest and conviction for such crimes, a WWE talent shall be immediately suspended and their contract terminated.

- On May 10, 1983, Nancy Argentino, the girlfriend of Jimmy Snuka, then 39 years old, died in their hotel room, hours after Snuka defeated José Estrada at a WWF TV taping at the Lehigh County Agricultural Hall in Allentown, Pennsylvania. Snuka was arrested 32 years later on September 1, 2015, and charged with third-degree murder and involuntary manslaughter for Argentino's death. This eventually led WWE to suspend his Legends contract (a long-term deal to make infrequent, non-wrestling appearances) and removed his Hall of Fame page from its website. However, Snuka never stood trial due to his poor health, and he died on January 15, 2017.
- In June 2003, Eddie Fatu (then known as "Jamal" and later "Umaga") was released after his involvement in a bar fight.
- In the aftermath of Chris Benoit's murder of his wife and son, along with his suicide in June 2007, the WWE removed mentions of Benoit in its broadcasts and its merchandise.
- On November 30, 2012, Thom Latimer, then known as Kenneth Cameron, was charged with battery of a law enforcement officer and disorderly intoxication in St. Petersburg, Florida which led him being released from his NXT contract by the WWE. Latimer had previously been arrested in January 2011 for driving under the influence.
- On December 10, 2017, Rich Swann was arrested in Gainesville, Florida on charges of battery and kidnapping/false imprisonment. The victim was identified as his wife, Vannarah Riggs. According to the arrest report, Swann and Riggs had gotten into an argument over Swann critiquing Riggs' performance at a show that night. When Riggs tried to get away from Swann, witnesses state that he grabbed her in a headlock and dragged her back into his car. WWE suspended Swann indefinitely and was released on February 15, 2018. He was originally scheduled to face Drew Gulak in a match to determine the number one contender to the Cruiserweight Championship, Enzo Amore, the following night on Raw, but the match was canceled in light of his domestic violence arrest.
- On January 22, 2018, the Phoenix Police Department confirmed that Eric Arndt (Enzo Amore) was under investigation for an alleged sexual assault that was reported to authorities in October 2017. Later that day, Arndt was suspended by WWE due to violating their zero tolerance policy for matters involving sexual harassment and sexual assault. WWE released a statement indicating that he would remain suspended until the matter was resolved. In an interview on January 23, a woman accused Arndt of raping her in a Phoenix, Arizona, hotel room on October 19, 2017. As a result, his scheduled title defense against Cedric Alexander at the Royal Rumble was canceled. Arndt was fired from WWE the next day and the title was vacated. On Twitter, Arndt "fully and unequivocally" denied the allegations against him. On May 16, 2018, the Phoenix Police Department ceased their investigation due to insufficient evidence.

=== Concussion lawsuit ===
Starting in 2014, numerous former WWE talent filed multiple lawsuits against WWE alleging that WWE did not protect and hid information from their talent about concussions and CTE. The former talent claimed physical and mental health issues as a result of physical trauma they experience in WWE. The lawsuits were filed by attorney Konstantine Kyros. US District Judge Vanessa Lynne Bryant dismissed many of the lawsuits in September 2018. In September 2020, the lawsuits were dismissed by the United States Court of Appeals for the Second Circuit. The Supreme Court of the United States subsequently declined to hear the case in April 2021.

=== Relationship with Saudi Arabia ===
The events promoted in Saudi Arabia by WWE have been subjected to criticism due to allegations of sportswashing. WWE has been accused of contributing to Saudi Arabia's discrimination of LGBT people and women by holding events in the country.

WWE's relation with Saudi Arabia has been condemned by activist groups such as Code Pink and several politicians.

=== Ashley Massaro affidavit ===
Prior to her death on May 15, 2019, former WWE wrestler Ashley Massaro alleged that she was sexually assaulted at a US military base during a 2006 WWE tour of Kuwait by a man posing as a doctor, and that WWE officials persuaded her to not report it to the appropriate authorities as they did not want it to affect the company's relationship with the military. WWE officials would later claim they had no knowledge of Massaro's alleged sexual assault.

After her death, an affidavit by Massaro describing the sexual assault allegations in detail was subsequently released by the law firm that represented her. In response, WWE said that their executives had not been previously informed of the allegations described in the affidavit. Despite previous denials from WWE about having knowledge of her allegation, in February 2024 an attorney representing former WWE Head of Talent Relations John Laurinaitis stated that: "most upper level management at sometime became aware of the [Massaro] allegations and ensured all proper WWE protocols were followed, including privacy for the alleged victim." That month, Vice News reported that the Naval Criminal Investigative Service had investigated Massaro's allegations from June 2019 to January 2020, although no further information about the investigation other than its existence is known. A further report by Vice News revealed that Massaro had accused Vince McMahon of "preying on female WWE wrestlers" and that she believed he had tried to sabotage her wrestling career after she rejected an advance from him.

=== Misconduct allegations involving Vince McMahon ===
One of the first allegations against Vince McMahon was made on April 3, 1992, when Rita Chatterton, a former referee noted for her stint as Rita Marie in the WWF in the 1980s and for being the first female referee in the WWF (possibly in professional wrestling history), made an appearance on Geraldo Rivera's show Now It Can Be Told. She claimed that on July 16, 1986, McMahon tried to force her to perform oral sex on him in his limousine; when she refused, he raped her. Former wrestler Leonard Inzitari has corroborated Chatterton's allegation. Several years later, on February 1, 2006, McMahon was accused of sexual harassment by a worker at a tanning bar in Boca Raton, Florida. At first, the charge appeared to be discredited because McMahon was in Miami for the 2006 Royal Rumble at the time. It was soon clarified that the alleged incident was reported to police on the day of the Rumble, but actually took place the day before. On March 25, it was reported that no charges would be filed against McMahon as a result of the investigation. Both Chatterton and a separate tanning spa worker who alleged that McMahon sexually assaulted her in California in 2011 filed civil sex abuse lawsuits against him in late 2022. McMahon would agree to pay Chatterton an undisclosed multimillion-dollar legal settlement.

In 2014, activist investor Emmanuel Lemelson stated that he believed the company had made material misrepresentations in its financial reporting and called for new leadership or a sale of the company. Lemelson's analysis was credited with an $800 million drop in the market capitalization of the stock.

In April 2022, the WWE board began investigating a $3 million hush-money settlement that McMahon paid over an alleged affair with a former employee of the company. The investigation also revealed other nondisclosure agreements related to misconduct claims by other women in the company against McMahon and executive John Laurinaitis, totaling $12 million. This eventually led to McMahon retiring from all of his positions on July 22, 2022, and a change in leadership of the WWE for the first time since 1982; he would later return to the company in January 2023 as executive chairman.

The company would eventually report $19.6 million in unrecorded payments made by Vince McMahon between 2006 and 2022.

In January 2024, McMahon's history of having a role with the WWE ended amid new allegation by ex-WWE employee Janel Grant. Grant accused McMahon and John Laurinaitis of not only sexually assaulting her, but also sex trafficking. The allegation also led to Slim Jim pausing its sponsorship of WWE events.

== See also ==
- List of WWE pay-per-view and livestreaming supercards
- List of WWE video games
- Professional wrestling in the United States
- List of most-subscribed YouTube channels
- List of most-viewed YouTube channels
