= Rumble =

Rumble or Rumbling may refer to:

== Companies ==
- Rumble (company), video hosting service

== Sounds and vibrations ==
- Rumble (noise), a form of low frequency noise
- Rumble, a haptic feedback vibration feature in video game controllers
- Rumbling, a quality of a heart murmur
- Stomach rumble, or borborygmus, a medical term

== Places ==
- Rumble, Shetland, an islet group off Whalsay, Scotland, UK
- Rumble, Indiana, US
- Rumble, West Virginia, US

== People ==
- Anthony Johnson (fighter), an American mixed martial artist nicknamed Rumble
- Dane Rumble (born 1982), New Zealand recording artist
- Darren Rumble (Australian rules footballer) (born 1984), Fremantle draftee
- Darren Rumble (ice hockey) (born 1969), Canadian ice hockey player and coach
- Mark Rumble, British television presenter on Studio Disney UK
- Paul Rumble (born 1969), English footballer
- Terry Rumble (born 1942), Australian politician
- Tony Rumble (1956–1999), American professional wrestler
- Mike Rumbles (born 1956), Scottish politician

== Arts and entertainment ==
=== Films and television ===
- Rumble (2002 film), a Finnish film directed by Jani Volanen
- Rumble (2016 film), a Mexican film directed by R. Ellis Frazier
- Rumble: The Indians Who Rocked the World, a 2017 Canadian documentary
- Rumble (2021 film), an American film directed by Hamish Grieve
- Rumble (TV series), a short-lived British sitcom; see 1995 in British television#BBC1

=== Music ===
==== Albums ====
- The Rumble (Abhinanda album), 1999
- The Rumble (N2Deep album), 1998

==== Songs ====
- "Rumble", by KDA, later reworked into a vocal version titled "Turn the Music Louder (Rumble)", 2015
- "Rumble" (instrumental), by Link Wray & His Raymen, 1958
- "Rumble" (Skrillex, Fred Again and Flowdan song), 2023
- "Rumble" (You Am I song), 1998
- "Rumble", by Excision and Space Laces, 2018
- "Rumble", by Kelis from Food, 2014
- "The Rumble", by MJ Cole and AJ Tracey, 2016
- "The Rumble", from the musical West Side Story, 1957
- "The Rumble"/"World's Crazy", by Róisín Murphy, 2018

=== Other uses in arts and entertainment ===
- Rumble, a puzzle in the 2003 MMORPG Puzzle Pirates
- Rumble, a 2019–present podcast by Michael Moore

== Sports and mascots ==
- Rumble (slamball team), a team from Philadelphia, Pennsylvania, U.S.
- Royal Rumble, an annual WWE professional wrestling pay-per-view event
  - Royal Rumble match, or The Rumble, the main attraction for the event
- Rumble the Bison, the mascot of the Oklahoma City Thunder in the NBA

== Engineering ==
- Rumbling is an alternative name for tumble finishing

== See also ==
- Earthquake
- Street fighting
