= The Rumble (Abhinanda album) =

Studio album by Abhinanda
- Released: 1999
- Genre: Hardcore
- Label: Desperate Fight Records
- Producer: Abhinanda, André Jacobsson

Abhinanda chronology
Abhinanda (1996)	The Rumble (1999)

The Rumble is a 1999 album by Abhinanda on Desperate Fight Records. In Spain the album was issued by Locomotive Music.

== Track list ==
1. "Junior"
2. "Highway Tonight"
3. "The Rumble"
4. "Easy Digestion"
5. "Showdown"
6. "No 1"
7. "Centipede"
8. "The Preacher"
9. "Take It Away"
10. "Shuffle the Deck"
11. "La Musica Continua"
