= Jennifer England =

American model and actress

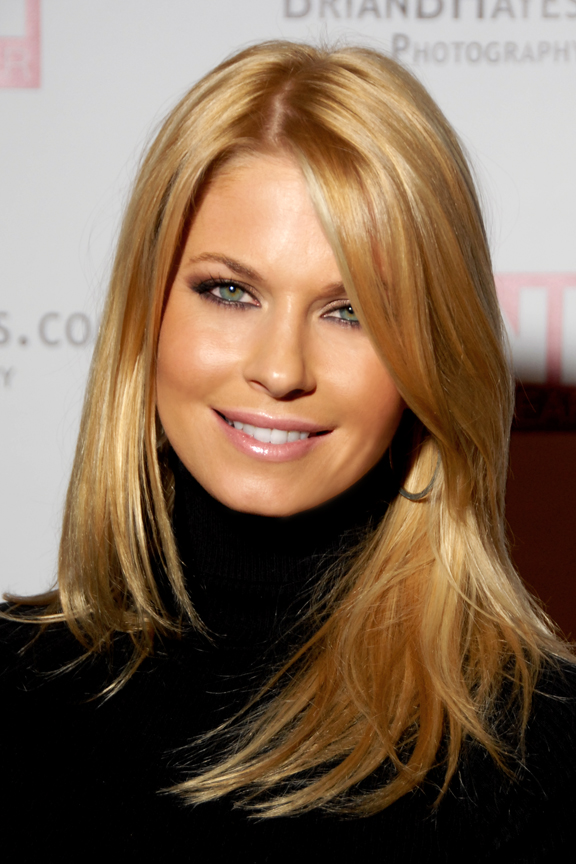
- Born: July 11, 1978 (age 47); Lansing, Michigan, U.S.
- Occupations: model, actress
- Years active: 2002-
- Height: 5 ft 7 in (1.70 m)

Jennifer England (born July 11, 1978) is an American model and actress.

== Early life and childhood ==
England was born and raised in the suburbs of Lansing, Michigan along with her brothers, Kris and Jeff. England soon got into sports and instantly deemed herself a 'tomboy'. From an early age, she participated in many sports including swimming and softball. Being a tomboy, England made an easy transition into the stunt world.

== World Wrestling Entertainment / WWE ==
=== Diva Search (2006–2007) ===
In the summer of 2006, England was chosen as one of eight contestants for the WWE Diva Search. During the contest, she lost a week's worth of "immunity" on the 14 July episode of SmackDown! after losing Sgt. Slaughter's "Diva Boot Camp" obstacle course—Layla won despite having jumped over several tires in the tire hop section of the course and not having both of her feet cross the finish line due to her doing a split. She lost another competition, the "Diva Search Talent Show" on the 11 August episode of SmackDown!. On August 16, England made it to the finals along with Layla El. Eventually, Layla became the winner of the 2006 Diva Search which made England the runner up. She ended her Diva Search campaign by kissing Layla before the two bikini clad women proceeded to grope and French kiss each other.

== Modeling and acting career ==
England has appeared in the movies Dodgeball: A True Underdog Story, Smokin' Aces, Transformers, G-Force, and Fast and Furious. She is a Guess model. She also was Miss Venus Swimwear International and Miss Hawaiian Tropic International. England served as a backstage interviewer for the short lived XARM MMA/arm wrestling hybrid league.

In April 2011, England was named the official 2011 St. Pauli Girl.
