= Intolerable Cruelty =

2003 film by Joel Coen

- Theatrical release poster
- Directed by: Joel Coen (Note: Although the Coen brothers co-directed this film, Joel received sole credit due to Directors Guild of America regulations)
- Screenplay by: Robert Ramsey; Matthew Stone; Ethan Coen; Joel Coen
- Story by: John Romano; Robert Ramsey; Matthew Stone
- Produced by: Ethan Coen (Note: Although the Coen brothers both produced this film, Ethan received sole credit due to Directors Guild of America regulations); Brian Grazer
- Starring: George Clooney; Catherine Zeta-Jones; Geoffrey Rush; Cedric the Entertainer; Edward Herrmann; Paul Adelstein; Richard Jenkins; Billy Bob Thornton
- Cinematography: Roger Deakins
- Edited by: Roderick Jaynes (Note: Roderick Jaynes is the shared pseudonym used by the Coen brothers for their editing.)
- Music by: Carter Burwell
- Production companies: Imagine Entertainment; Mike Zoss Productions; Alphaville
- Distributed by: Universal Pictures
- Release dates: September 2, 2003 (Venice); October 10, 2003 (United States)
- Running time: 100 minutes
- Country: United States
- Language: English
- Budget: $60 million
- Box office: $120.8 million

Intolerable Cruelty is a 2003 American romantic comedy film directed, co-written and edited by Joel and Ethan Coen, and produced by Brian Grazer and the Coens. The script was written by Robert Ramsey, Matthew Stone, and Ethan and Joel Coen, with the latter writing the last draft of the screenplay. The film stars George Clooney, Catherine Zeta-Jones, Geoffrey Rush, Cedric the Entertainer, Edward Herrmann, Paul Adelstein, Richard Jenkins, and Billy Bob Thornton.

Intolerable Cruelty premiered at the 60th Venice International Film Festival on September 2, 2003, and was released in the United States by Universal Pictures on October 10, 2003. The film received positive reviews from critics and grossed $120.8 million against a $60 million budget.

== Plot ==
Donovan Donaly, a TV soap opera producer, walks in on his wife Bonnie being intimate with an ex-boyfriend. He files for divorce, and she hires Miles Massey, a top divorce attorney and the inventor of the "Massey pre-nup", a completely foolproof prenuptial agreement. Miles wins a large property settlement against Donaly, leaving him broke.

Meanwhile, private investigator Gus Petch tails the wealthy and married Rex Rexroth on a drunken night out with a blonde. When they stop at a motel, he catches their tryst on video. Gus takes the video to Rex's wife, Marylin Rexroth, a marriage-for-money predator.

Marylin files for divorce, demanding a large property settlement. Unable to afford a divorce settlement, Rex hires Miles to represent him. Marylin's friend, serial divorcée Sarah Sorkin, warns her that Miles will be a dangerous opponent.

Marylin and her lawyer, Freddy Bender, fail to reach an agreement with Miles and Rex. The bored Miles asks the fascinating Marylin to dinner, where they flirt. While they are out, Gus breaks into her house and copies her address book for Miles, who has his assistant search among the names for Marylin's accomplice in arranging predatory marriages.

In court, Marylin feigns an emotional breakdown over Rex's infidelity, professing that she loved Rex unconditionally at first sight. Miles then calls "Puffy" Krauss von Espy, a Swiss hotel concierge. Puffy testifies that Marylin asked him to find her a marriage target who was very rich, foolish, and a philanderer whom she could easily divorce, and that he pointed her to Rex. The divorce is granted, but she gets nothing.

Seeking revenge against Miles, Marylin finds the now-penniless Donaly living on the street, still clutching his Emmy statuette, and offers him a chance to reclaim his lost glory. Soon after, she shows up at Miles' office with her new fiancé, oil millionaire Howard D. Doyle. Marylin insists on the Massey prenup—which will make it absolutely impossible for her to claim any of her fiancée's assets in the event of a divorce—over both Howard and Miles's objections. However, Howard destroys it during the wedding, as a demonstration of love.

Six months later, Miles goes to Las Vegas, to give the keynote address at a convention for divorce attorneys. He encounters Marylin, who has divorced Howard and presumably collected a sizable share of the Doyle Oil fortune. However, she admits that she is disenchanted with her wealthy but lonely life.

Miles marries Marylin on the spur of the moment, and signs the Massey prenup to prove that he has no interest in her fortune, but she tears it up. The next morning, Miles tells the convention that love is the most important thing, and that he is giving up divorce for pro bono work.

Shortly afterwards, Miles discovers that "Howard D. Doyle" is just an actor from one of Donaly's soap operas; Marylin tricked him, leaving his considerable wealth at risk. Desperate to save the firm's reputation, Miles' boss, Herb Myerson, suggests hiring hitman "Wheezy Joe" to kill Marylin.

Miles then learns that Marylin's ex-husband Rex has died without changing his will, leaving her his entire fortune. Since she is now the wealthier of the two parties, his assets are no longer at risk. Repentant, Miles rushes to save Marylin from Joe, but she has already offered to pay him double to kill him instead. In the confusion of the ensuing struggle, Joe mistakes his gun for his asthma inhaler and accidentally kills himself.

Later, Miles, Marylin, and their lawyers meet to negotiate a divorce. Miles pleads for a second chance and retroactively signs a Massey prenup. Realizing her own feelings for him, she tears it up, and they kiss. Marylin reveals that to get Donaly's help for supplying Howard, she gave him an idea for a hit TV show, restoring his fortunes in the process: America's Funniest Divorce Videos, with Gus as the host.

== Cast ==
- George Clooney as Miles Massey
- Catherine Zeta-Jones as Marylin Hamilton
- Geoffrey Rush as Donovan Donaly
- Cedric the Entertainer as Gus Petch
- Edward Herrmann as Rex Rexroth
- Paul Adelstein as Wrigley
- Richard Jenkins as Freddy Bender
- Billy Bob Thornton as Howard D. Doyle
- Julia Duffy as Sarah Batista O'Flanagan Sorkin
- Jonathan Hadary as Heinz, the Baron Krauss von Espy, called "Puffy" by Marylin
- Tom Aldredge as Herb Myerson
- Stacey Travis as Bonnie Donaly
- Wendle Josepher as Miles' Receptionist
- Jack Kyle as Ollie Olerud
- Isabell O'Connor as Judge Marva Munson
- Irwin Keyes as Wheezy Joe
- Colin Linden as Father Scot
- Kiersten Warren as Claire O'Mara
- Mia Cottet as Ramona Barcelona
- Royce D. Applegate as Mr. Gutman
- Judith Drake as Mrs. Gutman
- George Ives as Mrs. Gutman's Lawyer
- Blake Clark as Convention Speaker
- Kristin Dattilo as "The Leg" Girl
- Bridget Marquardt as Santa Fe Tart #1
- Camille Anderson as Santa Fe Tart #2
- Tamie Sheffield as Santa Fe Tart #3
- Emma Harrison as Santa Fe Tart #4
- Bruce Campbell as TV Surgeon

== Development ==
Intolerable Cruelty was the Coens' first job as writers-for-hire. It was based on an original concept by John Romano, author of The Third Miracle (Agnieszka Holland, 1999) and had been developed into a screenplay by Robert Ramsey and Matthew Stone, who wrote Big Trouble (Barry Sonnenfeld, 2002) and Life (Ted Demme, 1999). Among the script doctors who took a pass on the screenplay was Carrie Fisher in 1994.

The script was passed among directors and writers for several years, usually starting from the Coens' version.

=== Production ===
Initially the screenplay was attached to Ron Howard and then Jonathan Demme, who had planned to cast Julia Roberts and Hugh Grant in the lead roles. After their planned film of James Dickey's novel To The White Sea fell through, the Coens signed to direct the movie and dug out their original script to work with. Filming began on 20 June 2002 after being delayed due to George Clooney's schedule. Most of the film was shot around Beverly Hills; some was filmed in Las Vegas during a week at the end of production. With a budget of $60 million, it was the most expensive film directed by the Coens at that time.

Frequent collaborator and storyboard artist J. Todd Anderson served as second unit director, which earned him membership in the Directors Guild of America.

== Soundtrack ==
Original Motion Picture Soundtrack: Intolerable Cruelty

Soundtrack album by Carter Burwell and various artists
- Released: October 7, 2003
- Genre: Film score
- Length: 50:50
- Label: Hip-O

Professional ratings
Review scores
Source	Rating
Allmusic	3.5/5 stars
Movie Music UK	4/5 stars
SoundtrackNet	3.5/5 stars

Intolerable Cruelty is scored by Carter Burwell, in his tenth collaboration with the Coen Brothers.

The soundtrack album features a variety of pop songs and cues from Burwell's score. "The Boxer", first by Simon and Garfunkel and then as covered by Colin Linden, opens and closes the album. A Canadian blues musician, Linden had previously participated in Down from the Mountain, a live performance of music from the Coens' O Brother, Where Art Thou?, and he performs several Simon and Garfunkel songs in the film, including a snippet of Punky's Dilemma ("I wish I was a Kellogg's Corn Flake"), not included on the soundtrack release. Other songs include "Suspicious Minds" by Elvis Presley, "Non, Je Ne Regrette Rien" by Édith Piaf and "Glory of Love" by Big Bill Broonzy.

Tracks by Carter Burwell unless otherwise noted.

1. "The Boxer" (Simon and Garfunkel) – 5:09
2. "Intolerable Mambo" – 1:41
3. "Suspicious Minds" (Elvis Presley) – 4:33
4. "Hanky Panky Choo Choo" – 2:07
5. "Don't Cry Out Loud" (Melissa Manchester) – 3:48
6. "Feels So Good" (Chuck Mangione) – 9:42
7. "You Fascinate Me" – 1:40
8. "April Come She Will" (written by Paul Simon, performed by Colin Linden) – 0:59
9. "Heather 2 Honeymoon" – 1:39
10. "If I Only Knew" (Tom Jones) – 4:18
11. "Love Is Good" – 3:26
12. "Non, Je Ne Regrette Rien" (Édith Piaf) – 2:21
13. "No More Working" – 3:01
14. "Fully Exposed" – 1:46
15. "Glory of Love" (Big Bill Broonzy) – 2:20
16. "The Boxer" (Colin Linden) – 2:20

== Reception ==
=== Critical response ===
On review aggregator Rotten Tomatoes, the film has an approval rating of 76% based on 188 reviews, with an average rating of 6.80/10. The website's critical consensus reads, "Though more mainstream than other Coen films, there are still funny oddball touches, and Clooney and Zeta-Jones sizzle like old-time movie stars." Metacritic assigned the film a weighted average score of 71 out of 100, based on 40 critics, indicating "generally favorable" reviews. Audiences polled by CinemaScore gave the film an average grade of "C+" on an A+ to F scale.

=== Box office ===
The film opened with a gross of $12.5 million. By the end of its run, it had grossed $35.3 million in the United States and $85.5 million in other countries for a worldwide total of $120.8 million.
