= WWE Diva Search =

- 2007 Diva Search winner, Eve Torres.
- Also known as: WWE Raw Diva Search; Diva Search; Raw Divas Search
- Genre: Reality competition
- Created by: Vince McMahon
- Opening theme: "Walk Idiot Walk" by The Hives (2004); "Be Yourself" by Audioslave (2005); "Move Along" by The All-American Rejects (2006); "Let It Roll" by Velvet Revolver (2007)
- Country of origin: United States
- No. of seasons: 6
- No. of episodes: 7

Production
- Camera setup: Multicamera setup

Original release
- Network: Spike TV (2004–2005); USA Network (2006); UPN (2006); WWE.com (2007, 2013)
- Release: July 1, 2003 – December 15, 2013

Related
- Total Divas; WWE Tough Enough; WWE LFG

WWE Diva Search (formerly WWE RAW Diva Search) is an American talent reality competition that was produced and held by World Wrestling Entertainment (WWE). The first winner was Jaime Koeppe, but she did not receive a contract like subsequent winners of the contest. Other winners included Christy Hemme, Ashley Massaro, Layla El, Eve Torres and Natalie Eva Marie. In addition to the winners of the yearly contest, WWE has hired several contestants as Divas, the name that WWE gave at the time to the female performers. There were many failed attempts at bringing back the competition over the years following the cancellation of the 2008 season, and was at one point going to return in 2015, under the new name WWE Superstar Search, but those plans were scrapped.

== 2003 ==
On June, 18, 2003, WWE announced their intention to embark on a countrywide quest for a fresh addition to their roster of WWE Divas. It was emphasized that the final decision regarding the selection of the new Diva would rest solely in the hands of the fans. The 2003 Diva Search invited women aged 18 or above who believed they possessed the qualities required to be the next WWE Diva, applicants were required to submit a photograph of themselves along with a brief biography explaining their aspirations to become a WWE Diva.

WWE Diva Search
- Winner: Jaime Koeppe
- Runner-up: Terri Mitchell

On July, 1, 2003, fans were given the opportunity to cast their votes for their favorite contestant, through fan voting, the potential contestants were narrowed down to a group of 16 by July, 20, then reduced down to a further 8 finalists by July, 29. The final 4 Diva hopefuls were confirmed on August, 6. The final 4 were then awarded a trip to WWE's SummerSlam pay-per-view event in Phoenix, Arizona where they competed in a final event that was broadcast live on WWE's web-show, Byte This!. The winner of the 2003 WWE Diva Search was Jaime Koeppe. Fitness model and Trading Spouses star, Deeann Donovan was a reject from this season of the search.

Contestants
Name	Age	Hometown	Placement
Jaime Koeppe	25	Vancouver, British Columbia, Canada	Winner
Terri Mitchell	30	Trenton, Michigan, U.S	Runner-Up
Marsha Christensen	32	Euless, Texas, U.S	3rd Place
Paige	N/A	N/A	4th Place

=== After the competition ===
Despite winning the contest, Koeppe did not receive a WWE contract but featured in a segment during the SummerSlam pay-per-view sat in the audience. She also received a photoshoot for WWE Magazine and appeared on an episode of WWE Confidential. She confirmed in a 2005, blog post that she was invited to take part in the 2004, search but ultimately declined the offer.

== 2004 ==
In 2004, WWE decided to make an extension of the Diva Search, by holding the contest live on RAW with the winner earning a one-year contract worth $250,000. Over 7,000 women applied to be a part of the search, with the final ten contestants being chosen on a live casting special which aired on Spike TV on July, 15, hosted by Jonathan Coachman with guest judges; Chris Jericho, Edge, Randy Orton and Triple H, with special guest appearances from Mae Young and The Fabulous Moolah.

The search began airing weekly segments on RAW, on July, 19, with fans being able to vote for the winner. Despite official statements by the WWE, suggesting the contest would be handled in a "classy manner", the contest involved contestant Divas performing suggestive acts on live television, including; "seducing" former WWE wrestler Kamala, dancing suggestively, stripping down to their bikini's, rubbing ice-cream and pie in to their breasts for Tajiri and The Rock and covering themselves in chili to arm-wrestle.

WWE Diva Search
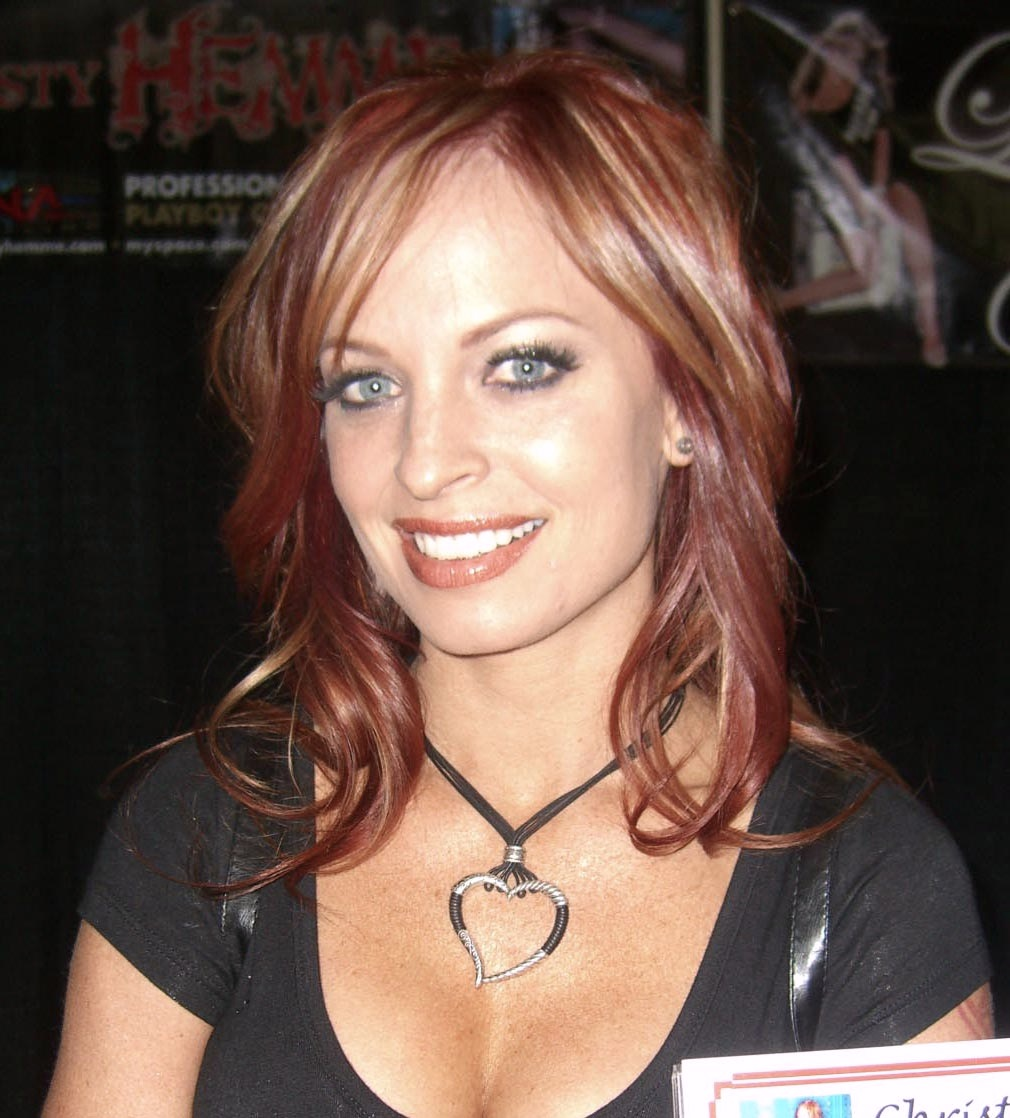
- Christy Hemme, the 2004 Diva Search winner
- Winner: Christy Hemme
- Runner-up: Carmella DeCesare

Release
- Original network: Spike TV
- Original release: July 15 – September 20, 2004

The most controversial segment from the contest took part during the "Diss The Diva" challenge on the August, 30, episode of RAW, hosted by Stacy Keibler. Before the challenge began, Maria Kanellis was eliminated from the competition and gave Carmella DeCesare the middle finger. The four finalists (Amy Weber, Carmella DeCesare, Christy Hemme and Joy Giovanni) competed in a live shoot promo challenge, the segment has gained notoriety for being one of WWE's most explicit segments in history. The contest began with Giovanni squeezing Weber's breasts and spanking Hemme before calling out DeCesare stating; "Carmella, you talk a lot of shit, but look at you, you've got a gap so wide you could drive a truck right through there baby!". Weber went on to also call out DeCesare calling her a "whore" and claiming she "didn't know shit, about wrestling", she then went on to tell DeCesare that "having a cock in her mouth had nothing to do with wrestling", before calling her a "bitch". DeCesare responded by outing Giovanni as a mother by saying; "what a great role model you are mom, talking shit on TV.", something Giovanni had not told WWE higher-ups, and calling her fat by telling her to "shake her fat ass", to which Giovanni responded by twerking on DeCesare. DeCesare then went on to claim that Weber was jealous of her and that Playboy laughed at Weber's attempt to audition for the magazine, despite Weber having been on the cover in 1993, Weber responded by shouting at DeCesare that she had bad breath. Hemme continued the verbal beatdown on DeCesare by calling her a "cum-burping gutter slut". The censors could not keep up with the live audio with RAW commentators Jerry Lawler and Jim Ross asking if they were still live on air. When the contest ended, Lawler stated on commentary to "forget dissing, we need disinfectant." with Ross replying that he couldn't wait for the next elimination the following week. In a 2023, interview Giovanni revealed that she was confronted by Stephanie McMahon backstage about having a child.

The winner of the 2004 WWE Diva Search was Christy Hemme. Despite only one winner being crowned in the competition each year, WWE hired a large number of contestants and immediately placed them on main roster programming. From the 2004 Diva Search; Amy Weber, Joy Giovanni, Maria Kanellis and Michelle McCool all received contracts after losing the contest. Future WWE Women's Champion, Candice Michelle was a reject from this season of the search. Future Flavor of Love season 2 contestant Jennifer "Toasteee" Toof was also a reject from the competition.

=== Official themes ===
The 2004 WWE RAW $250,000 Diva Search featured four official theme songs.

- "Open Your Eyes" by Alter Bridge (Note: "Open Your Eyes" is played when each of the top ten finalists are voted out of the competition.)
- "Real Good Girl" by Jim Johnston (Note: "Real Good Girl" by Jim Johnston was written exclusively for the 2004 WWE Raw $250,000 Diva Search competition. The song was later featured in WWE ThemeAddict: The Music, Vol. 6.)
- "Time and Time Again" by Chronic Future
- "Walk Idiot Walk" by The Hives (Note: "Walk Idiot Walk" was also used as the official entrance theme for Christy Hemme after winning the competition.)

=== Top 28 ===
Open casting calls were held in Los Angeles, California, New York, New York, and Chicago, Illinois, in June and July 2004. The following 28 finalists were chosen from each of the locations:

Name	Age	Hometown	Selected/Not selected
Amy Weber	34	Mapleton, Illinois	Selected (Finalist)
Alison Weder	23	Minooka, Illinois	Not selected (Semi-finalist)
Bobbi Sue Luther	25	Silver Spring, Maryland	Not selected (Semi-finalist)
Camille Anderson	26	Dallas, Texas	Selected (Finalist)
Candice Michelle	25	Milwaukee, Wisconsin	Not selected (Semi-finalist)
Carmella DeCesare	22	Avon Lake, Ohio	Selected (Finalist)
CeCe Wagner	22	Chicago, Illinois	Not selected (Semi-finalist)
Chandra Costello	28	Liberty, Kentucky	Selected (Finalist)
Christina Hernandez	24	Odessa, Texas	Not selected (Semi-finalist)
Christy Hemme	23	Poway, California	Selected (Finalist)
Erin "Kelly" Britz	25	Kansas City, Kansas	Not selected (Semi-finalist)
Gabrielle Tuite	26	Brooklyn, New York	Not selected (Semi-finalist)
Jaynie Mae Baker	23	New York City, New York	Not selected (Semi-finalist)
Jennifer R. Lopez	26	Lodi, New Jersey	Not selected (Semi-finalist)

Name	Age	Hometown	Selected/Not selected
Joy Giovanni	26	Boston, Massachusetts	Selected (Finalist)
Julia Costello	28	Liberty, Kentucky	Selected (Finalist)
Karen McDougal	33	Merrillville, Indiana	Not selected (Semi-finalist)
Kimberly Cozzens	21	San Jose, California	Not selected (Semi-finalist)
Kimmy Brown	24	Seattle, Washington	Not selected (Semi-finalist)
Maria Kanellis	22	Ottawa, Illinois	Selected (Finalist)
Mary Castro	25	LaVerne, Connecticut	Not selected (Semi-finalist)
Michelle McCool	24	Palatka, Florida	Selected (Finalist)
Nicole Bradhurst	24	Kansas City, Missouri	Not selected (Semi-finalist)
Nina Hardin	22	Carson, California	Not selected (Semi-finalist)
Tammy Vallejos	24	Albuquerque, New Mexico	Not selected (Semi-finalist)
Taryn J. Reed	25	Charlotte, North Carolina	Not selected (Semi-finalist)
Tracie Wright	24	Atlanta, Georgia	Selected (Finalist)
Yesenia Camacho	30	Austin, Texas	Not selected (Semi-finalist)

=== Finalists ===
Name	Age (Note: Ages were at time of filming.)	Hometown	Eliminated
Christy Hemme	23	Poway, California, U.S	Winner
Carmella DeCesare	22	Avon Lake, Ohio, U.S	Runner-Up
Joy Giovanni	26	Boston, Massachusetts, U.S	3rd Place
Amy Weber	34	Mapleton, Illinois, U.S	4th Place
Maria Kanellis	22	Ottawa, Illinois, U.S	5th Place
Tracie Wright	24	Atlanta, Georgia, U.S	6th Place
Michelle McCool	24	Palatka, Florida, U.S	7th Place
Chandra Costello	28	Liberty, Kentucky, U.S	8th Place
Camille Anderson	26	Dallas, Texas, U.S	9th Place
Julia Costello	28	Liberty, Kentucky, U.S	10th Place

=== After the competition ===
Christy Hemme went on to pose on the cover of WWE magazine and Playboy magazine. She competed at WrestleMania 21 for the WWE Women's Championship against Trish Stratus in a losing effort. She was released from the WWE in December 2005, and found more success in Total Nonstop Action Wrestling (TNA). She worked for TNA from 2006 until her retirement in 2016, briefly returning in a backstage role from 2022 until 2025, in 2006 she was fan-voted the TNA Knockout of the Year.

Despite never signing a contract with the WWE, Carmella DeCesare went on to face Christy Hemme at Taboo Tuesday 2004, in a losing effort, before leaving the wrestling business completely. In 2026, she became a main cast member on The Real Housewives of Orange County.

Joy Giovanni went on to become the valet of the Big Show, being involved in the main event storyline of Smackdown! She was fan-voted the WWE 2005 Rookie Diva of the Year, before being released in July, 2005. She returned in 2009, for one night only, as a legend Diva, alongside Miss Jackie, Molly Holly, Sunny, Torrie Wilson and Victoria, in the WrestleMania 25 battle royal.

Amy Weber went on to become the valet of John "Bradshaw" Layfield, being involved in the main event storyline of Smackdown!. She quit the company in February, 2005, due to alleged bullying and harassment from Edge and Randy Orton.

Maria Kanellis went on to work for the WWE from 2004-2010. During her time she posed on the cover of Playboy magazine in 2008 and was fan-voted the 2009 WWE Diva of the Year. She went on to work across various other wrestling promotions including; Ring of Honor (ROH), New-Japan Pro Wrestling (NJPW) and TNA, where she became a one time TNA Knockouts Champion. She wrestled at WrestleMania 24, 25 and 35. She returned to the WWE again in 2017, becoming a one time WWE 24/7 Champion, before being released in 2020 due to budget cuts related to the COVID-19 pandemic. She debuted and worked for All Elite Wrestling (AEW) in 2022, departing in February, 2025.

Michelle McCool went on to work for the WWE from 2004-2011. During her time she went on to become a two time WWE Women's Champion and the inaugural WWE Divas Champion, which she also won on two separate occasions. She won a battle royal to win the 2010 Slammy for WWE Diva of the Year, and won the 2010 Knucklehead Moment of the Year award that same night. She most notably was one half of LayCool, alongside future 2006 winner, Layla El, during their time as a team they drew the highest television ratings on Smackdown! during their feud against Mickie James and went on to face The Divas of Doom (Beth Phoenix and Natalya) in the first ever women's tables match. She wrestled at WrestleMania 25, 26, and 27. She competed in the first ever women's extreme makeover match, first women's loser leaves the WWE match and the first ever women's Royal Rumble match. In 2025, during an appearance on ESPN's Get Up alongside her husband The Undertaker, Triple H appeared via satellite to surprise McCool with an induction into the WWE Hall Of Fame Class of 2025, making her the third contestant and the first 2004 contestant to receive that honor. That year, she was the winning Legend in the second season of WWE LFG.

Despite being rejected from the competition, Candice Michelle went on to work for the WWE from 2004-2009. During her time she posed on the cover of Playboy magazine in 2006, and won the WWE Women's Championship. She also won the WWE 24/7 Championship. She wrestled at WrestleMania 22 and was the special guest time keeper at WrestleMania 25. In 2026, she signed to TNA as a backstage producer.

== 2005 ==
WWE Diva Search
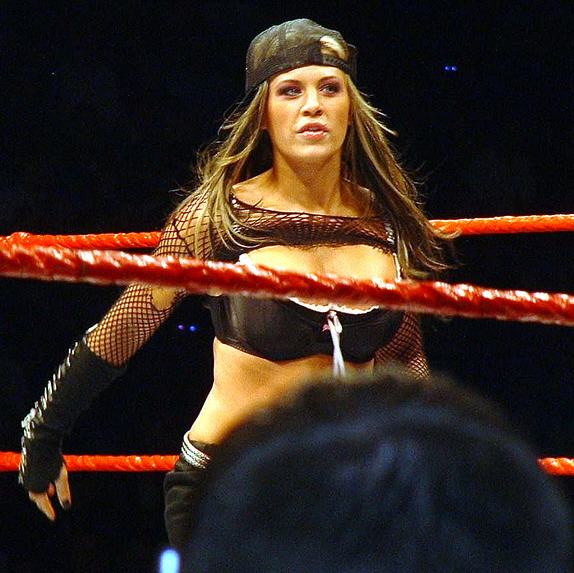
- Ashley Massaro, the 2005 Raw Diva Search winner
- Winner: Ashley Massaro
- Runner-up: Leyla Milani

Release
- Original network: Spike TV
- Original release: June 27 – August 15, 2005

In 2005, WWE continued the Diva Search holding the contest live on RAW. This time being hosted by Jonathan Coachman and Christy Hemme. The search began on June 27, ending August, 15. On the July, 4, edition of RAW, Leyla Milani accidentally exposed her breasts during the obstacle course challenge, leading her to be "disqualified" from winning immunity from the elimination that week. The controversial "Diss The Diva" challenge returned from the previous year, however, this time it was pre-taped not live and the contestants received 20 seconds to "diss", not 30. Before the finale, Ashley Massaro famously gave her legitimate phone number out live on air to talk to her supporters.

The winner of the 2005 WWE Diva Search was Ashley Massaro. From the 2005 Diva Search; Elisabeth Rouffaer and Kristal Marshall received contracts after losing the contest. Trenesha Biggers was a reject from this season of the search but was still offered a developmental contract with the company. Future 2007 Diva Search contestant, Lena Yada was also rejected from this season.

=== Official theme ===
The 2005 WWE RAW Diva Search featured one official theme song.

- "Be Yourself" by Audioslave (Note: "Be Yourself" was also used as the official entrance theme for Ashley Massaro after winning the competition.)

=== Contestants ===
Name	Age (Note: Ages were at time of filming.)	Hometown	Eliminated
Ashley Massaro†	26	Babylon, New York, U.S	Winner
Leyla Milani	23	Toronto, Ontario, Canada	Runner-Up
Elisabeth Rouffaer	22	Santa Cruz, California, U.S	3rd Place
Kristal Marshall	21	Los Angeles, California, U.S	4th Place
Summer DeLin	24	Shreveport, Louisiana, U.S	5th Place
Cameron Haven	24	Lake Worth Beach, Florida, U.S	6th Place
Simona Fusco	25	Milan, Italy	7th Place
Leilene "Alexis" Ondrade	23	Toronto, Ontario, Canada	8th Place

=== After the competition ===
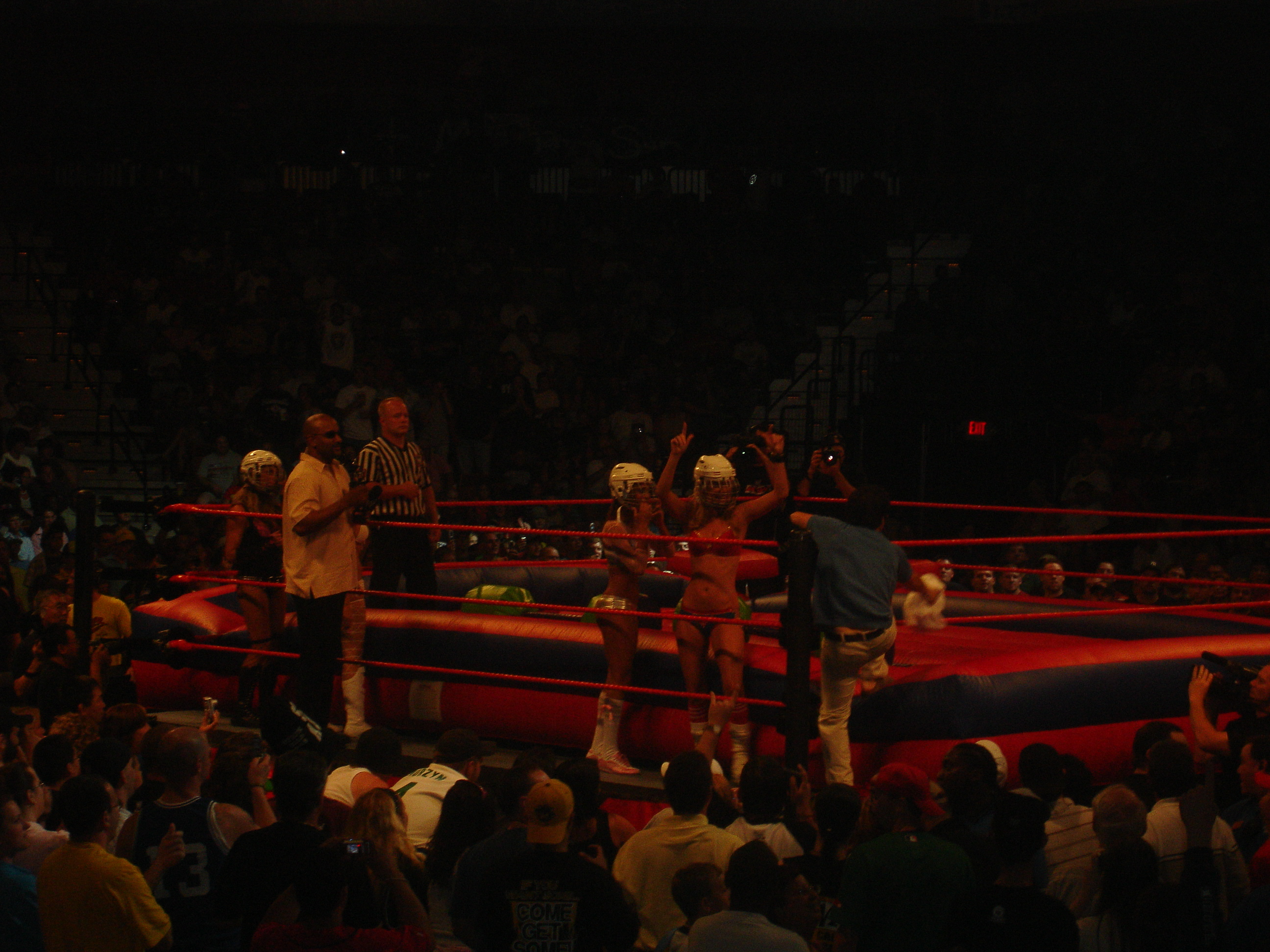
Rob Schneider and Diva search contestants August 1, 2005

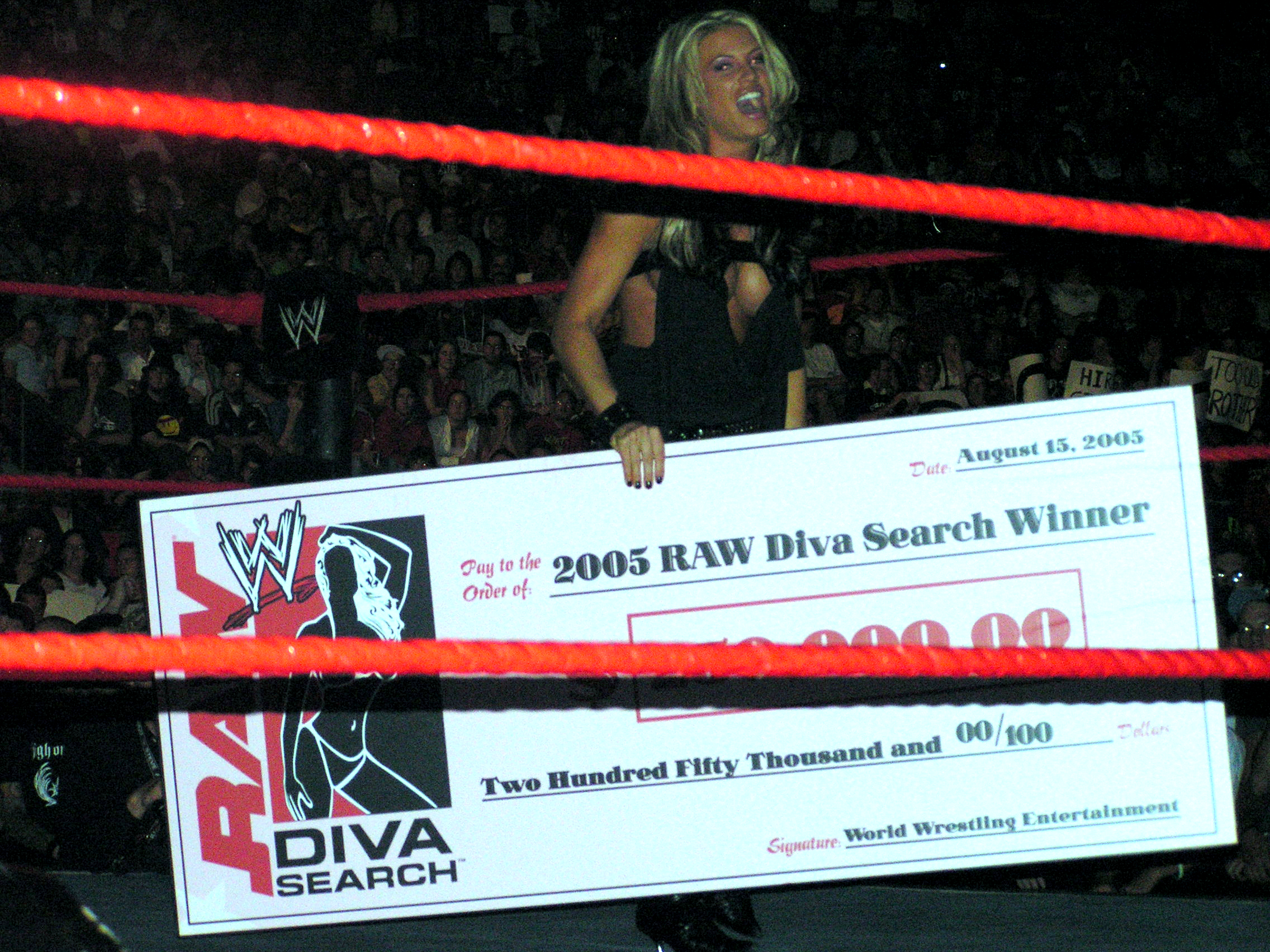
Ashley Massaro pictured here as she was announced as the 2005 winner

Ashley Massaro went on to pose on the cover of Playboy magazine in 2007, and competed at WrestleMania 23 for the WWE Women's Championship against Melina in a losing effort, she also wrestled at WrestleMania 24 in a tag team match alongside Maria losing to Beth Phoenix and Melina. In 2007, she had a cameo role in an episode of Smallville and she competed and finished 15th place on the reality television series Survivor: China. She was granted her release from the WWE in 2008. She died on May 16, 2019 by suicide at the age of 39.

Elisabeth Rouffaer signed a developmental contract after the contest, but quit the company shortly after, never making any appearances.

Kristal Marshall went on to become a backstage interviewer for the Smackdown brand. She later turned heel and began wrestling, feuding against 2006 Diva Search winner Layla. In 2007, she became the on-screen girlfriend of Smackdown general manager Theodore Long, occasionally being left in charge of the show, Long eventually proposed to Marshall. On the September 21 episode of Smackdown during Marshall and Long's in-ring wedding, Long suffered a heart attack as part of the storyline, Marshall was released from her WWE contract a few weeks later. She briefly worked for TNA as the valet of her real life husband, Bobby Lashley from October 2009, to February 2010 before the couple were granted their release from the company.

Despite never signing a contract with the WWE, Alexis went on to make a brief appearance for WWE, writing a poem for WWE.com as a superfan, she later made regular appearances in TNA as a ring girl alongside SoCal Val. She found fame in the VH1 celebreality era, appearing on Flavor of Love season 1, Flavor of Love Girls: Charm School and I Love Money season 2 going under the nickname Smiley and by her real name, Leilene.

Despite being rejected from the from the competition, Trenesha Biggers went on to sign a developmental contract with WWE, never making any televised apperances. She most notably worked for TNA from 2008-2009 as the valet of Scott Steiner, under the ring name Rhaka Khan. She also worked for Lucha Libre USA from 2010-2011. In 2015, she was one of the many former WWE developmental talent who accused Bill Demott of assault, bullying, homophobia, racism and sexual harassment.

== 2006 ==
WWE Diva Search
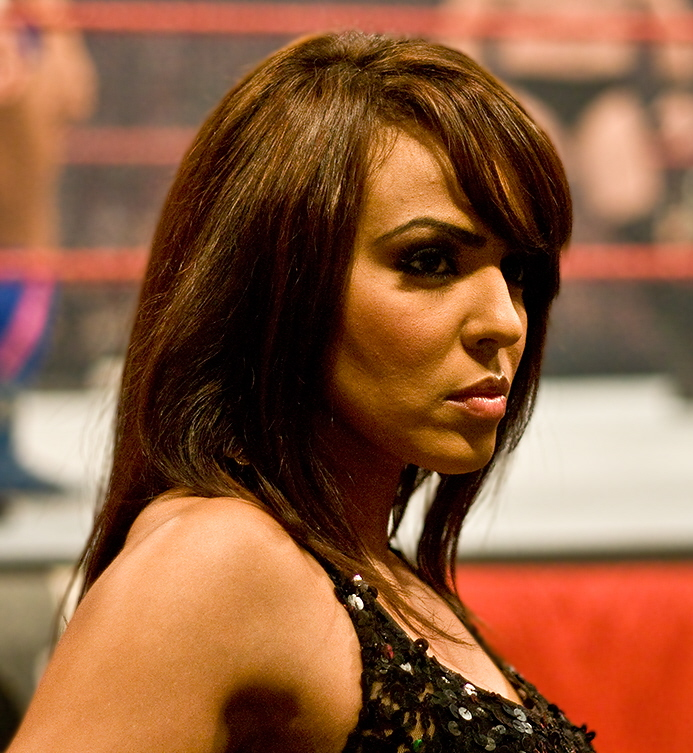
- Layla El, the 2006 WWE Diva Search winner and only winner to become WWE Women's Champion and WWE Divas Champion
- Winner: Layla El
- Runner-up: Jen England

Release
- Original network: USA Network
- Original release: July 10 – August 16, 2006

In 2006, WWE continued the Diva Search holding the contest live on RAW and Smackdown. The competition began on the July 10, episode of RAW with a new host, Mike "The Miz" Mizanin. The introductory segment for the new contestant Diva's infamously went down awkwardly with host Mizanin forgetting his lines, stammering and pausing for several minutes while trying to explain the voting procedures for the contest, as well as reading the phone number off of his wrist and mispronouncing the names of the contestants. During a musical chairs contest, Rebecca DiPietro legitimately pushed J.T. Tinney on the floor and attempted to pull her t-shirt down to expose her breasts after losing the game to Tinney.

The finale was broadcast on a live special that aired on August, 16, 2006, on the USA Network. The winner of the 2006 WWE Diva Search was Layla El. From the 2006 Diva Search; Amy Zidian, Maryse Ouellet, Milena Roucka and Rebecca DiPietro all received contracts after losing the contest. The Bella Twins (Brie and Nikki Garcia) and Brooke Adams were rejected from this season of the search, but all received WWE contracts. Jennifer Walcott was originally part of the final 8 contestants, but quit the show before filming due to schedule conflicts with other projects, she was replaced by Erica Chevillar.

=== Official themes ===
The 2006 WWE Diva Search featured three official theme songs.

- "Face Down" by The Red Jumpsuit Apparatus
- "Move Along" by The All-American Rejects (Note: "Move Along" was briefly used as the official entrance theme for Layla El after winning the competition.)
- "Out Here All Night" by Damone

=== Contestants ===
Name	Age (Note: Ages were at time of filming.)	Hometown	Eliminated
Layla El	29	London, England	Winner
Jennifer England	27	Lansing, Michigan, U.S	Runner-Up
J.T. Tinney	25	Phoenix, Arizona, U.S	3rd Place
Milena Roucka	26	Vancouver, British Columbia, U.S	4th Place
Erica Chevillar	23	Boca Raton, Florida, U.S	5th Place
Rebecca DiPietro	26	Rehoboth, Massachusetts, U.S	6th Place
Maryse Ouellet	23	Montreal, Quebec, Canada	7th Place
Amy Zidian	20	Orlando, Florida, U.S	8th Place

=== After the competition ===
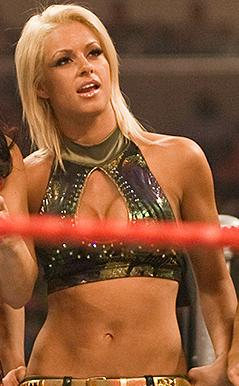
Maryse Ouellet

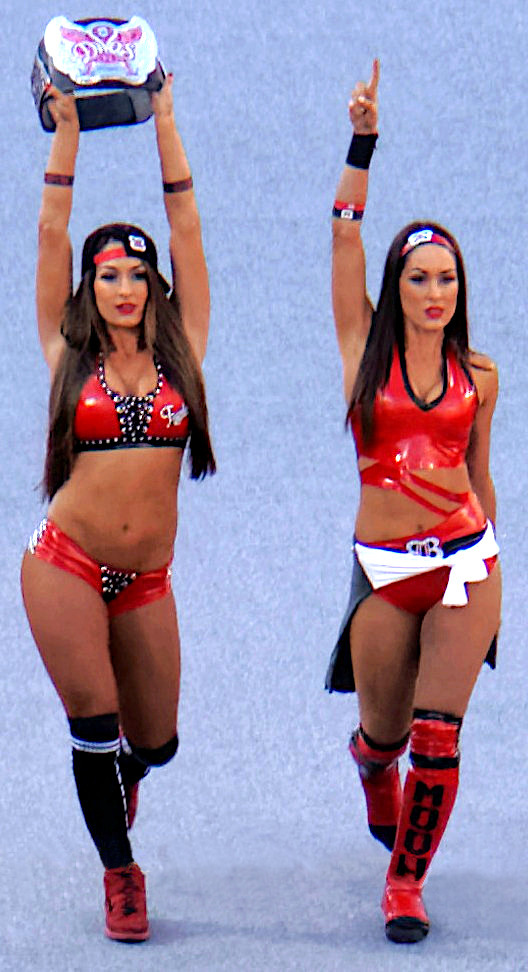
The Garcia Twins

Maryse Ouellet and the Garcia twins were 2006 contestants who went on to have long-term WWE careers

Layla El went on to debut on the Smackdown brand. She shortly moved to the ECW brand a part of the group Extreme Exposé. She was offered to pose for Playboy but rejected the offer. She most notably was one half of LayCool, alongside former 2004 contestant, Michelle McCool, during their time as a team they drew the highest television ratings on Smackdown! during their feud against Mickie James and went on to face The Divas of Doom (Beth Phoenix and Natalya) in the first ever women's tables match. She won the 2010 Knucklehead Moment of the Year award, alongside McCool. El went on to win and be the last WWE Women's Champion, being the only British woman to win the title, she also held the WWE Divas Champion, being the first British woman to do so. She retired from professional wrestling in 2015. She wrestled at WrestleMania 25, 26, 27 and 30. She won the first ever women's loser leaves the WWE match, defeating her former partner, Michelle McCool. She is widely regarded as one of the best talents to emerge from the search.

Milena Roucka signed a developmental contract, officially debuting on the RAW brand in November, 2008, under the ring name Rosa Mendes. She went on to work as a wrestler and mainly as a valet for multiple wrestlers throughout her 10 year tenure including; Beth Phoenix, Epico & Primo, Fandango and Zack Ryder. In 2010, she won the Best Use of Exercise Equipment award. She wrestled at WrestleMania 25 and 30. She was a main cast member on the WWE reality television series; Total Divas from 2014-2017. She retired from professional wrestling in 2017.

Rebecca DiPietro went on to become a backstage interviewer for the ECW brand debuting in October, 2006. She was granted her release from the company on March 22, 2007.

Maryse Ouellet signed a developmental contract, officially debuting on the Smackdown brand in September 2006, in pre-taped vignettes. She went on to become a two time WWE Divas Champion. She was released from the WWE in October, 2011. She returned to the company in April, 2016, as the valet to her real life husband The Miz. She wrestled at WrestleMania 25, 26 and at WrestleMania 33 where she teamed up with her husband in a losing effort to John Cena and Nikki Bella. In 2016, she joined the cast of Total Divas, departing from the show in 2018, for her own spin-off reality television series titled; Miz & Mrs.

Amy Zidian went on to become the valet of Jimmy Wang Yang debuting for the Smackdown brand in October, 2006. She was fired from the company in December, 2006. It was alleged she was fired after multiple backstage incidents involving; Kristal Marshall, Layla, Stephanie McMahon and Vickie Guerrero. Zidian returned to the independent circuit, most notably for Women's Extreme Wrestling, where she went on to become a one time WEW World Tag Team Champion alongside Annie Social, she retired from wrestling in late 2007.

Despite being rejected from the competition, Brie and Nikki Garcia signed developmental contracts, officially debuting on Smackdown in November, 2007, under the ring names Brie Bella and Nikki Bella. Brie went on to become a one time WWE Divas Champion and a one time WWE Women's Tag Team Champion alongside Paige. She won the 2013 Diva of the Year award, as well as the 2013 and 2014, Couple of the Year award alongside her husband Daniel Bryan. Nikki went on to become a two time WWE Divas Champion, becoming the longest reigning Divas champion in WWE history. She also won the 2013 Diva of the Year award, and won the award again in 2015. They went on to join the cast of Total Divas from 2013-2019, receiving their own spin-off reality series; Total Bellas from 2016-2021. They wrestled at WrestleMania 25, 30, 31, 32, 33 and 42. They both competed in the first ever women's Royal Rumble match. In 2021, they were inducted into the WWE Hall Of Fame Class of 2021, making them the first Diva Search contestants to receive the honour. They retired from full time in-ring competition in late 2016, making sporadic appearances until their official retirement in 2019. In 2025, Nikki returned to full time in-ring competition, with Brie returning in 2026.

Despite being rejected from the competition, Brooke Adams went on to debut for the ECW brand in January, 2007, a part of the group Extreme Exposé. She was released from the WWE on November, 1, 2007. She found more success in TNA, working for the company from 2010-2015, briefly returning in 2017. She became a three time TNA Knockout's champion and a one time TNA Knockout's World Tag Team Champion alongside Tara.

== 2007 ==
WWE Diva Search
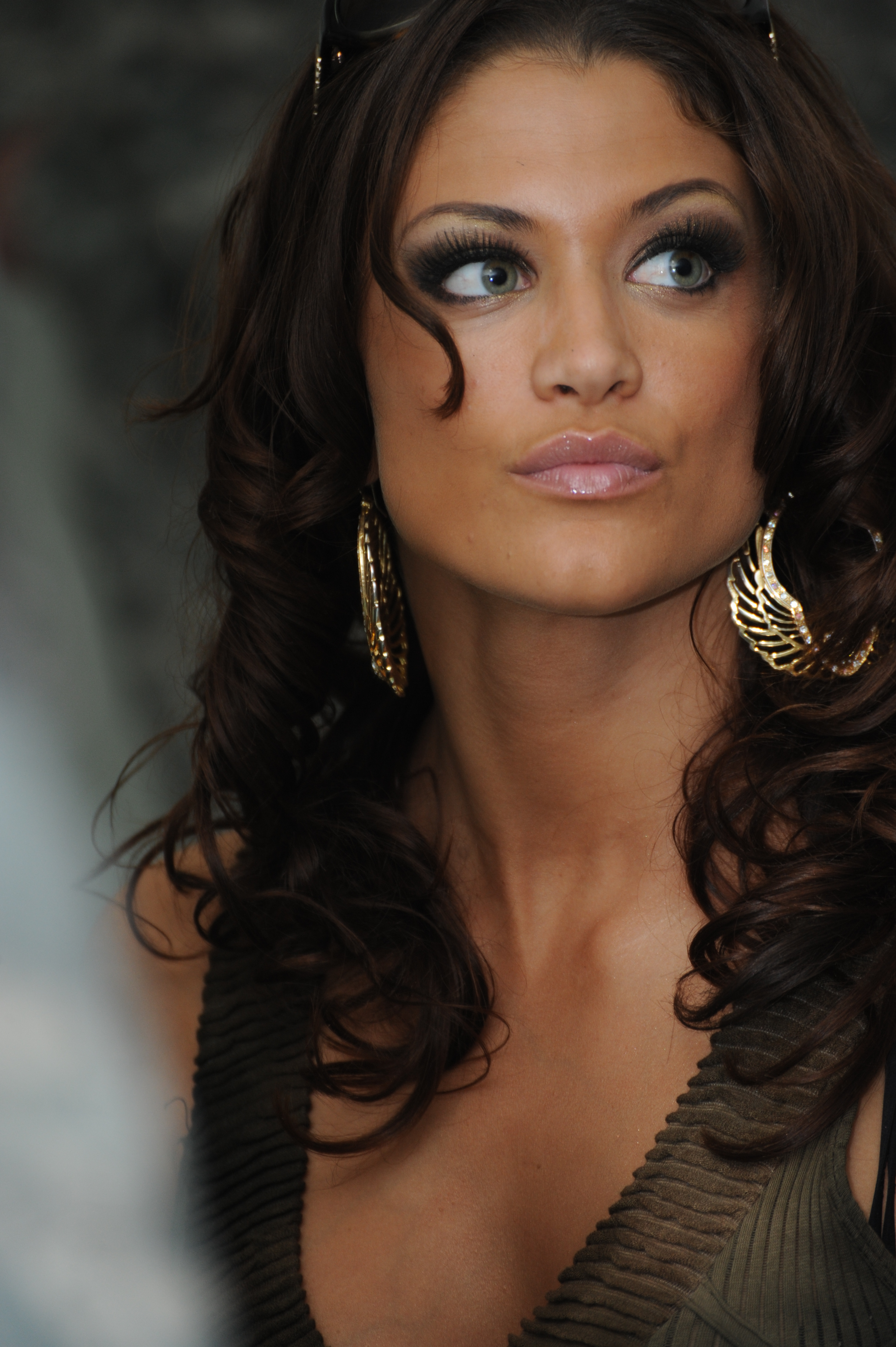
- Eve Torres, the 2007 Diva Search winner and first-ever three-time WWE Divas Champion
- Winner: Eve Torres
- Runner-up: Brooke Gilbertsen

Release
- Original network: WWE.com
- Original release: September 10 – October 29, 2007

In 2007, WWE once again continued the WWE Diva Search, unlike previous seasons, this search was the first to take place exclusively on WWE.com with majority of the segments pre-taped. The first competition began on September, 10, with the winner being announced live on the October, 29, episode of RAW.

The winner of the 2007, Diva Search was Eve Torres. From the 2007 Diva Search; Lena Yada and Taryn Terrell received contracts after losing the contest. Angela Fong was a reject from this season but was still offered a developmental contract with the company. Other notable rejects included future TNA Knockouts Champion and Hall of Fame Inductee, Jamie "Velvet Sky" Szantyr and future The Bachelor star, Gia Allemand.

In 2008, WWE officially cancelled the Diva Search.

=== Official theme song ===
The official theme song for the 2007 WWE Diva Search was "Let it Roll" by Velvet Revolver from the band's second studio album, Libertad, which was released on July 3, 2007. At the time of release, Velvet Revolver was an American hard rock supergroup that featured vocalist Scott Weiland, guitarists Slash and Dave Kushner, bassist Duff McKagan and drummer Matt Sorum. "Let it Roll" was only used as the official theme song for the competition and was not used as the official entrance theme song for the winner of the competition. Special thanks to Velvet Revolver

=== Contestants ===
Name	Age (Note: Ages were at time of filming.)	Hometown	Eliminated
Eve Torres	22	Denver, Colorado, U.S	Winner
Brooke Gilbertsen	22	Chicago, Illinois, U.S	Runner-Up
Lena Yada	27	Los Angeles, California, U.S	3rd Place
Taryn Terrell	21	New Orleans, Louisiana, U.S	4th Place
Jessica Hatch	26	Montreal, Quebec, Canada	5th Place
J. Kim	24	Catawba, North Carolina, U.S	6th Place
Lyndy Frieson	22	Vancouver, British Columbia, U.S	7th Place
Naomi Kirk	24	West Yorkshire, England	8th Place

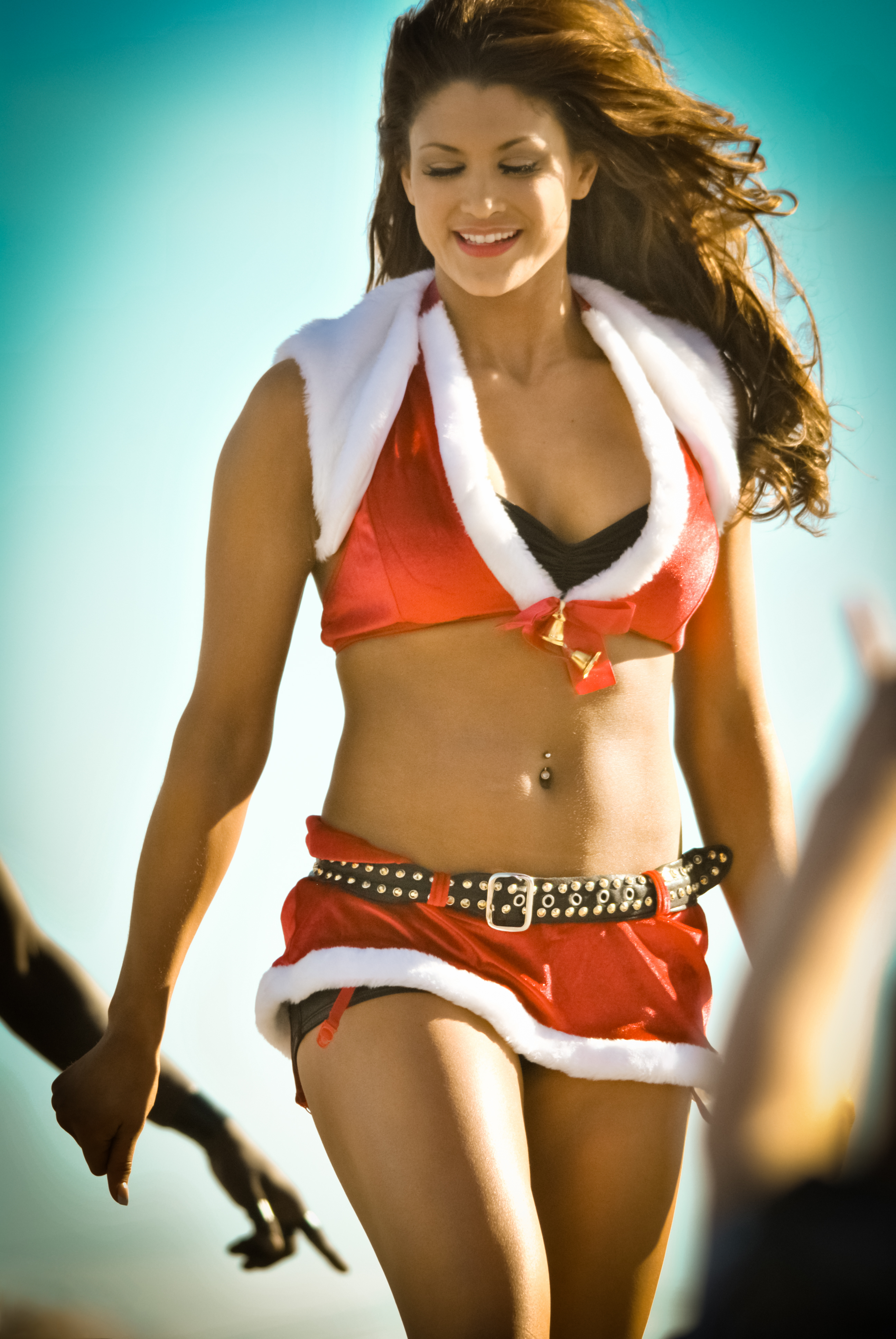
A picture of the 2007 Diva Search winner Eve Torres.

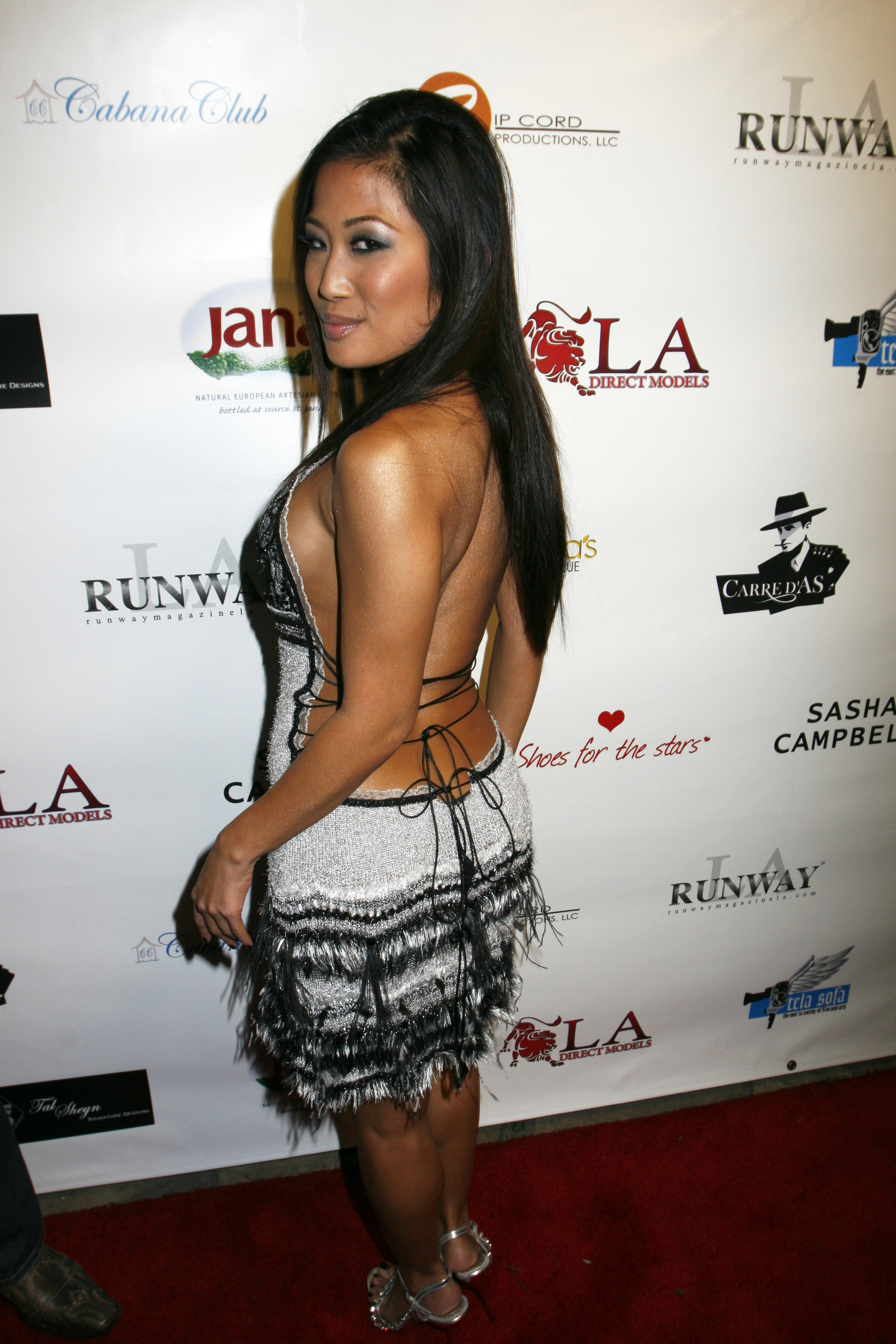
A picture of former 2007 Diva Search contestant Lena Yada.

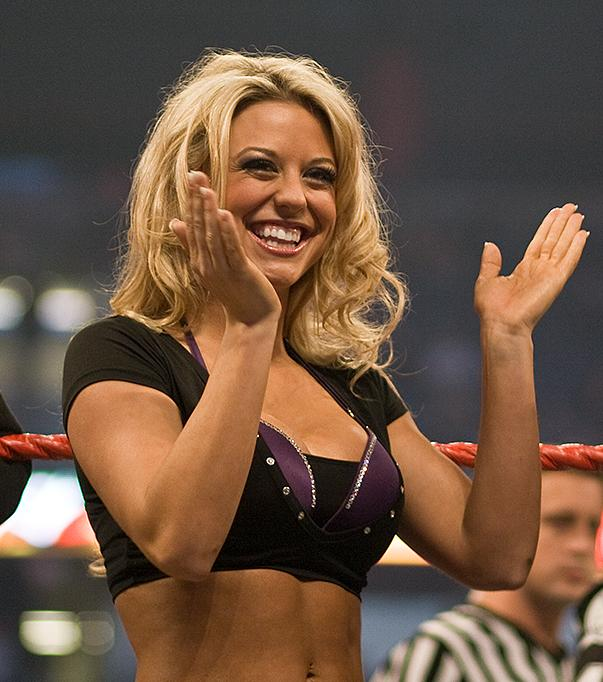
A picture of another 2007 Diva Search contestant Taryn Terrell as Tiffany in the WWE.

=== After the competition ===
Eve Torres went on to debut on the Smackdown brand as a ring announcer. During her time in the WWE she became the first winner of the contest to win the WWE Divas Championship, she won the title a total of three times, being the first woman to do so. She wrestled at WrestleMania 25, 26 and WrestleMania 28 in a tag team match alongside Beth Phoenix, in a losing effort to Kelly Kelly and Maria Menounos. In late 2011, to mid 2012 she was involved in the main event storyline of WWE programming alongside John Cena, Kane, Zack Ryder and others. At Survivor Series 2011, she took Beth Phoenix's Glam Slam finishing move from the top rope despite being told they were not allowed to perform the move from WWE higher ups. She retired from professional wrestling in 2013. She is also regarded as one of the best talents to emerge from the search.

Lena Yada went on to become a backstage interviewer for the ECW and Smackdown brands debuting in January, 2008. She was released from her contract on November, 10, 2008. She made several appearances wrestling on the independent circuit and made brief appearances in TNA and ROH.

Taryn Terrell signed a developmental contract, debuting for the ECW brand on the June 10, 2008 episode under the ring name, Tiffany as the assistant general manager. She eventually transitioned in to a full time wrestler, wrestling at WrestleMania 25, before being released from her contract on November, 19, 2010. She went on to compete for TNA under her real name, from 2012-2016 and briefly returning again in 2017 and in 2026, she held the TNA Knockouts Championship and was the 2014 TNA Knockout of the Year. She also wrestled for the National Wrestling Alliance (NWA).

Despite being rejected from the competition, Angela Fong signed a developmental contract with the WWE debuting in September, 2009, as a backstage interviewer and ring announcer for the ECW brand under the name Savannah, she was released from her contract in June, 2010. She later wrestled for Lucha Underground under the ring name Black Lotus between the years of 2014-2018.

== 2013 ==
WWE Diva Search
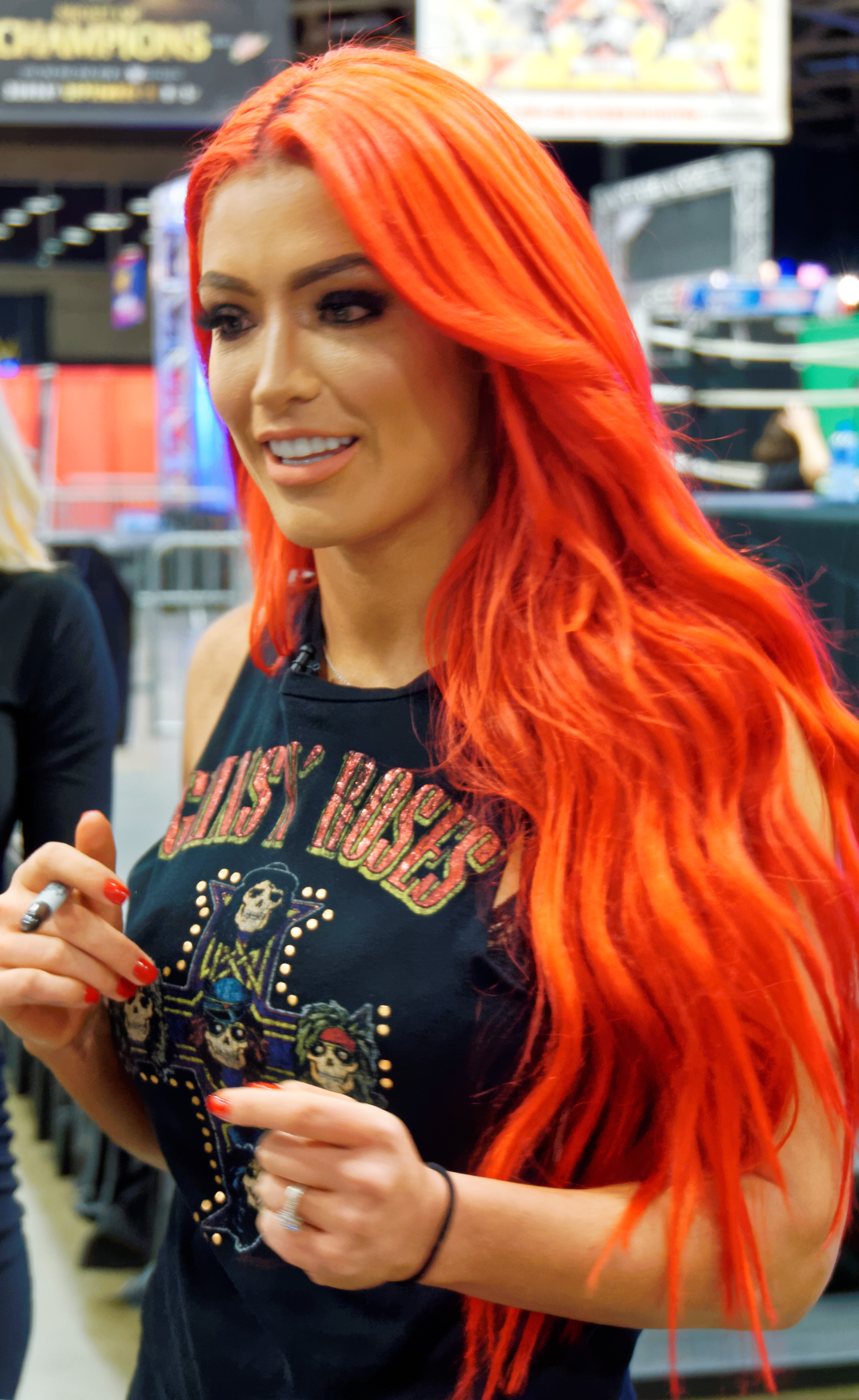
- Natalie Eva Marie, the 2013 WWE Diva Search winner and Total Divas reality star.
- Winner: Natalie Eva Marie
- Runner-up: Joseann Offerman

Release
- Original network: WWE.com/E! (TV series Total Divas) (2013)
- Original release: July 28 – December 15, 2013

In 2013, the Wrestling Observer Newsletter reported that the WWE returned the competition and held an un-aired Diva Search in February, in the Los Angeles area. The search was hosted by Eve Torres and Sara Del Rey.

The winner of the 2013, Diva Search was Natalie Eva Marie. From the 2013 Diva Search; Brittany Fetkin, CJ Perry, Erika Hammond and Joseann Offerman all received contracts after the competition. Alexis "Alexa Bliss" Kaufman and Sarah Bäckman were both rejected from this season of the search but received developmental contracts.

=== Official theme song ===
The 2013 WWE Diva Search featured one official theme song.

- "Top of the World" by CFO$ (Note: The song was also used for WWE's reality TV series by the name of Total Divas.)

=== Contestants ===
Name	Age	Hometown	Notes
Natalie Eva Marie	28	Walnut Creek, California, U.S	Winner
Joseann Offerman	18	Los Angeles, California, U.S	Runner-up
Aimee Fogelman	24	North Pole, Alaska, U.S	Eliminated
Brittany Fetkin	24	San Diego, California, U.S	Eliminated
CJ Perry	27	Gainesville, Florida, U.S	Eliminated
Courtney "Jaguar" Cameron	27	Saint Paul, Minnesota, U.S	Eliminated
Erika Hammond	21	Lubbock, Texas, U.S	Eliminated
Jennifer Sterger	29	Miami, Florida, U.S	Eliminated
Maysa Quy	25	Irvine, California, U.S	Eliminated
Olivia Karpinski	24	Miami, Florida, U.S	Eliminated

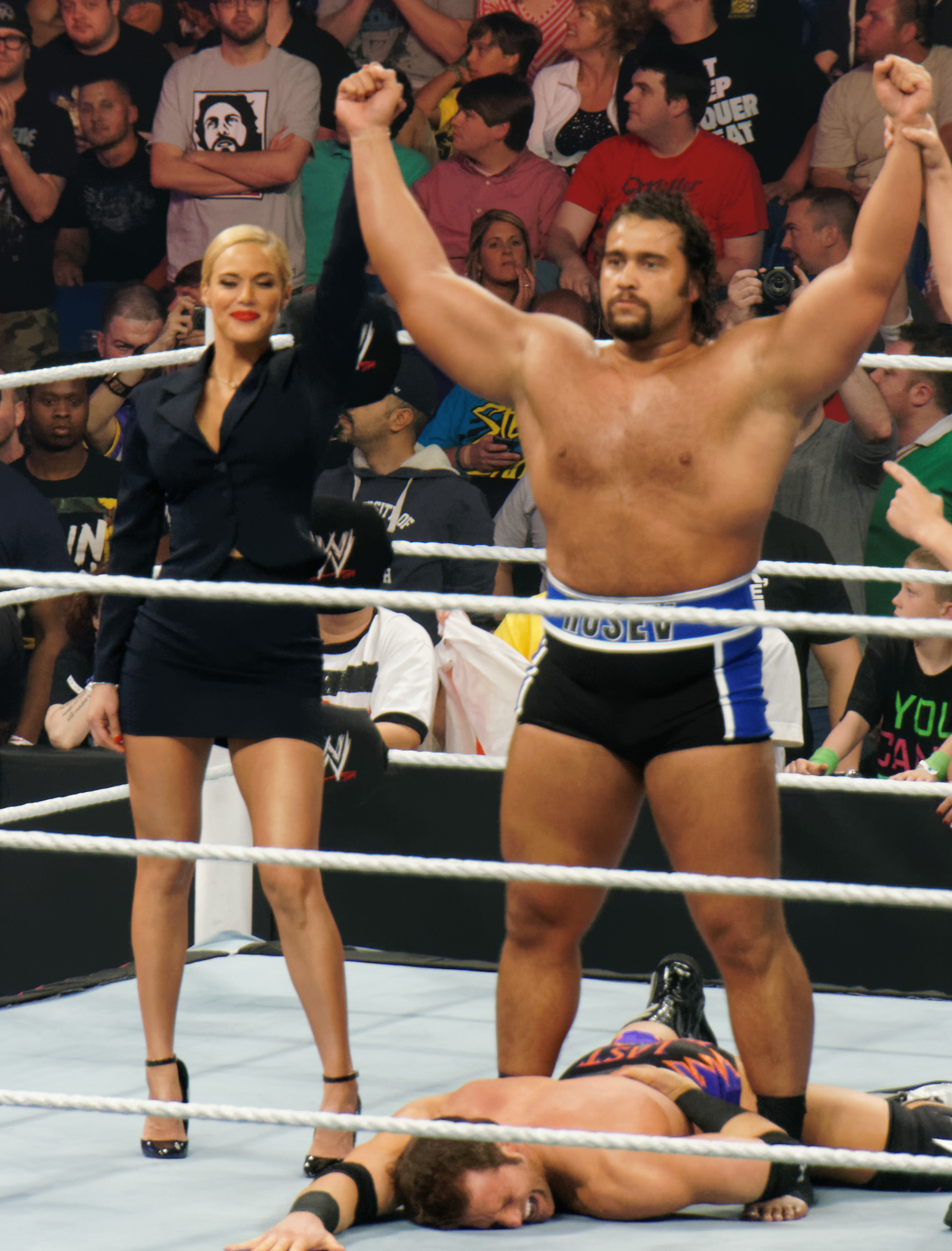
A picture of former contestant CJ Perry beside Rusev.

=== After the competition ===
Natalie Eva Marie officially made her WWE debut as a cast member on the first season of WWE reality television series, Total Divas. She debuted on the main roster under the name Eva Marie, after only having two weeks of any formal training. She infamously received negative reactions from the live audiences during her tenure due to her lack of in-ring ability, in 2014, she had a singles match against Alicia Fox which was pulled from the broadcast. She was with WWE from 2013, until her release on August, 4, 2017. She returned again briefly in October, 2020, but was released on November 4, 2021. She wrestled at WrestleMania 30 and 32.

Joseann Offerman officially made her WWE debut as a cast member on the first season of WWE reality television series, Total Divas. She debuted on the main roster under the name JoJo, after only having two weeks of any formal training. In late 2013, after competing in a few matches she transitioned to a full time ring announcer and backstage interviewer, a role she remained in until her release from the company in 2021. She debuted for AEW in January, 2025, as a ring announcer.

Brittany Fetkin went on to become a backstage interviewer for WWE's developmental brand NXT, under the name Devin Taylor. She wrestled on NXT house shows but never on television, she was released from her contract in October, 2015.

CJ Perry went on to become a valet for her husband Rusev, under the name Lana, debuting on NXT in October 2013. The pair were shortly promoted to the main roster and in 2016, she began to wrestle sporadically, transitioning to a full time wrestler in late 2019. She joined the main cast of Total Divas in 2015. She competed at WrestleMania 32 making her official in-ring debut, she also competed at WrestleMania 34, 35 and 37. She competed in the first ever women's royal rumble match. She was released from her contract on June 2, 2021. She briefly worked for AEW from September, 2023, to December, 2023. She signed a legends contract with WWE in 2025, confirming her retirement.

Erika Hammond went on to become a backstage interviewer for WWE's developmental brand NXT, under the name Veronica Lane. She wrestled on NXT house shows but never on television, she was granted her release from her contract in September, 2014. In 2026, she joined the main cast of The Real Housewives of New York City.

Despite being rejected from the competition, Sarah Bäckman signed a developmental contract with the WWE, she was granted her release from her contract in April, 2014, never making any appearances.

Despite being rejected from the competition, Alexis Kaufman signed a developmental contract with the WWE, she made her official debut on the May 8, 2014 episode of NXT, under the ring name, Alexa Bliss. She has since become a three time WWE RAW Women's Champion, a two time WWE Smackdown Women's Champion, a five time WWE Women's Tag Team Champion, a one time WWE 24/7 Champion, one time Ms. Money in the Bank winner and the second WWE Women's Triple Crown Champion, being the only Diva Search hopeful to win all titles, except the WWE Women's Tag Team Champion and WWE 24/7 Champion. She competed in and won the first ever women's elimination chamber match, the first ever women's extreme rules match and first ever women's kendo stick on a pole match. She has competed at WrestleMania 33, 34, 36 and 42, she was the official host of WrestleMania 35. She was a main cast member on the seventh season of Total Divas. As of 2026, she is still active on WWE's main roster programming.

== Cancelled revival ==
In 2015, during WrestleMania 31, WWE announced multiple new reality shows set to air on the WWE Network, including a returning Diva Search. The official advertisement video package for the returning Diva Search featured clips of the most successful former contestants. The show was ultimately cancelled in late 2015 due to WWE phasing out the term "Diva" that same year. In July, 2016, WWE surveyed fans about potential new WWE Network shows, including a new season of the Diva Search, now under a new name the WWE Superstar Search, being hosted by Lita and Trish Stratus.

In 2019, WWE announced that the Diva Search would return as a competition reality show like the original format, renamed for a second time WWE Stars, being co-produced by Bunim-Murray Productions who began casting for the show. On September 29, that same year, Squared Circle Sirens reporter Casey Michael confirmed that the show had been cancelled again. Rumored names for the new reality series were; independent wrestlers Karissa Rivera, Lady Frost, Nicole Marie and Tasha Steelz and Blacklisted Me lead singer, Lexus Amanda. As of 2026, there has been no discussion on bringing back the competition.

== Winners ==
Year Won	Winners
2003	Jaime Koeppe
2004	Christy Hemme
2005	Ashley Massaro †
2006	Layla El
2007	Eve Torres
2013	Natalie Eva Marie

== See also ==
- NXT Season 3
- WWE Tough Enough
- Women in WWE
- Mae Young Classic
- WWE LFG
- TNA Gut Check
