= Lena Yada =

American professional wrestler (born 1978)

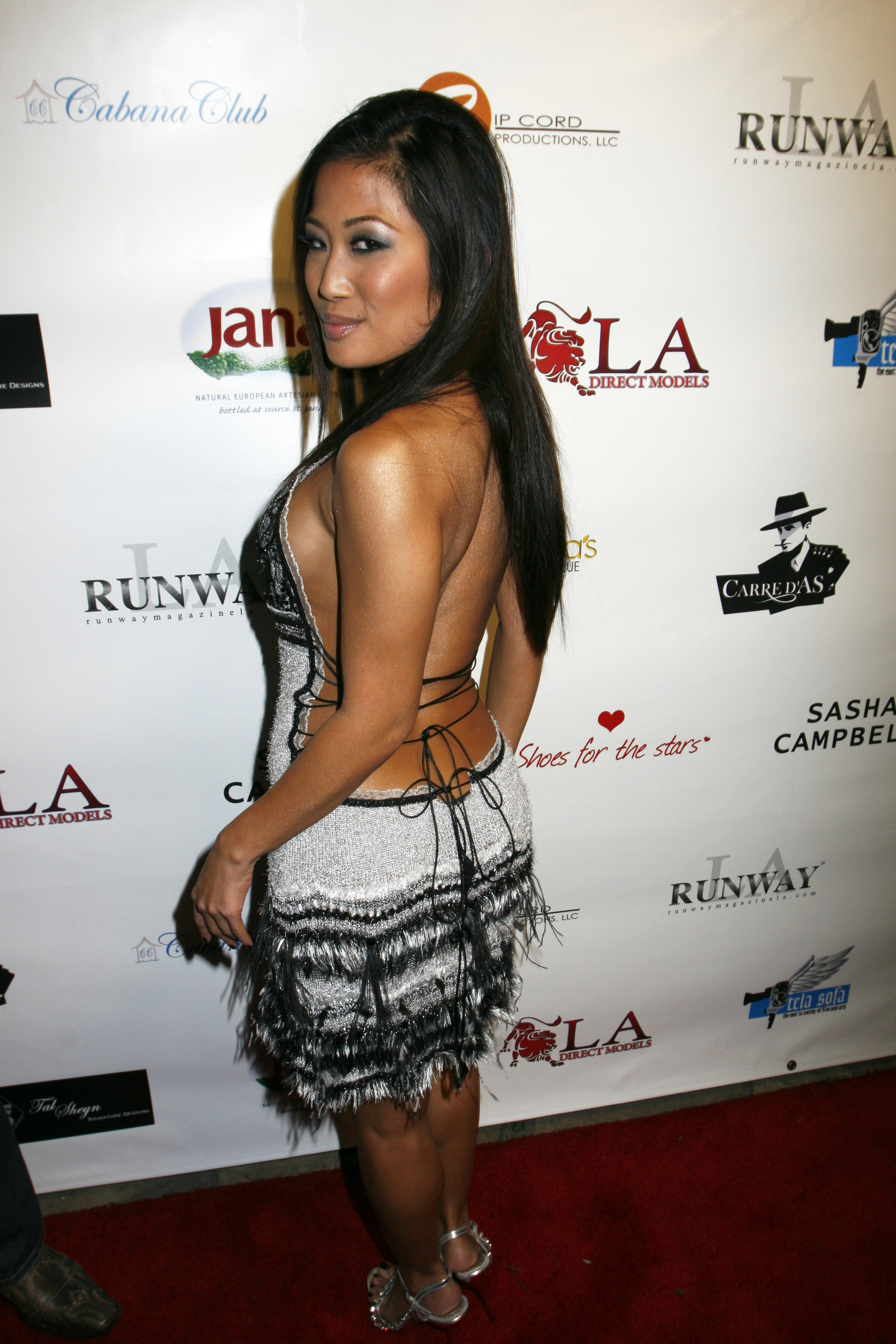
- Yada in 2009

Personal information
- Born: November 12, 1978 (age 47) Honolulu, Hawaii, U.S.
- Spouse: David Draiman (m. 2011; div. 2023)
- Children: 1

Professional wrestling career
- Ring name(s): Lena; Lena Yada; Ninja Yada
- Billed height: 5 ft 4 in (1.63 m)
- Billed weight: 108 lb (49 kg)
- Billed from: Los Angeles, California
- Trained by: Ultimate Pro Wrestling; Florida Championship Wrestling; Jesse Hernandez
- Debut: January 4, 2008
- Retired: 2009

Lena Yada-Draiman (born November 12, 1978) is an American model, actress, surfer, and former professional wrestler. She is best known for her time with the World Wrestling Entertainment (WWE), where she took part in the WWE Diva Search in 2007 and was a member of the ECW brand.

== Modeling career ==
Yada was the runner-up in the 2002 Ms. Venus Swimwear international pageant, she was also Miss Hawaiian Tropic Japan. She appeared in multiple magazines. She modeled for Bench Warmer trading cards, posing in the 2004, 2006, 2008 and 2009 trading sets. She took part in the 2005 Lingerie Bowl playing for the Dallas Desires. Yada under the stage name of Reina featured in multiple softcore, fetish pornographic videos between 2003 and 2011.

Yada was one of Sprite's campaign models when they changed their logo, featuring in official commercials and online advertisements. That same year and following year, she was the campaign model for Sheiki Jeans and for Western Star. In 2010, she featured in the music video for Disturbed's single, "The Animal".

== Surfing career ==
Yada competed in the quarter finals of the 2007 World Title of Tandem Surfing, placing thirteenth overall. In March 2008, she and her surfing partner, Jason Lusk, placed fourteenth overall for the World Title. She was ranked the eighth overall surfer in the world, in tandem surfing.

== Professional wrestling career ==
=== World Wrestling Entertainment (2007–2008) ===
Yada first auditioned for the WWE 2005 Diva Search as a fan of professional wrestling, making it to the top 30 finalists before being cut. She auditioned again in 2007 making the final 8 contestants, where she placed third overall. Despite being eliminated from the competition on the October 22, 2007 episode of RAW, she was signed to a WWE contract on November 10, 2007 and began training at WWE's developmental territory Florida Championship Wrestling. Yada made her official WWE debut on the January 4, 2008 episode of Smackdown! as a backstage interviewer, interviewing Big Daddy V and Matt Striker.

After appearing once on Smackdown! on the January 8, 2008, episode of ECW, she was transferred to the brand, as the new backstage interviewer of ECW. Yada hosted a Diva Dance Off competition between Kelly Kelly and Layla, only to include herself and declare herself the winner of the contest. She later competed in a best body contest against Kelly Kelly and Layla, turning heel in the process joining forces with Layla to attack Kelly Kelly who won the competition. Yada then became the valet of Layla and Victoria, accompanying them to their matches on both ECW and Smackdown! while continuing as the backstage interviewer for ECW. During her time on the ECW brand she coined the nickname "The Asian Sensation".

On the June 16, 2008, episode of RAW, Yada competed in a bikini contest, which was won by Maria. In August 2008, she teamed with the UncoverTheCure charity and WWE, running in L. A.'s Underwear Affair, raising $600 ($897.00 in 2025). Yada competed in the WWE 2008 Cyber Sunday, Divas annual Halloween Costume Contest, where she dressed as a ninja, losing to Mickie James who was dressed as Lara Croft. On the November 3, 2008, 800th special episode of RAW, Yada won her in-ring debut in a 16-diva tag team match, when Beth Phoenix pinned Mae Young; despite this being Yada's in-ring debut she was never tagged in to the match. On November 10, 2008, Yada was released from her WWE contract just one week after her in-ring debut after she declined to move to Tampa, Florida, as requested by the company due to her father falling ill. (Note: Attributed to multiple sources:) Her second and final match with the company was for FCW in a 6-diva tag team match where she teamed with Alicia Fox and Roucka, losing to the team of Angela, Eve Torres and Jenny Quinn.

=== Independent circuit (2008–2009) ===
In the summer of 2008, Yada began training at the Ultimate Pro Wrestling facility, based in California. Yada made her singles match debut at Pro Wrestling Revolution, a part of ChickFight, on June 6, 2009, where she defeated Christina Von Eerie with a schoolgirl roll-up. That same year she was in attendance at TNA's Bound For Glory pay-per-view as a friend of Tara; it was rumored by wrestling dirt sheets that she was set to debut for the company as the valet of Kevin Nash. In 2021, Yada returned to wrestling for a one-night-only appearance at Ring of Honor as the official host of the ROH Women's Tournament Town Hall.

== Personal life ==
On September 25, 2011, Yada married David Draiman, the lead singer of heavy metal bands Disturbed and Device. Their son was born in September 2013. The couple divorced in 2023.

== Filmography ==
Film and television
Year	Title	Role	Notes
2002	Son of the Beach	Nokia	1 episode
2004	Naked in the 21st Century	Self; model	
2005	Casting Ripe Live!	Self; model	
2005	Lingerie Bowl	Dallas Desire	
2007	VH1's The Shot	Red carpet model	
2007	I Now Pronounce You Chuck & Larry	Hooters Girl	
2007	WWE 2007 Diva Search	Self; contestant	3rd place, 8 episodes
2008	Squeegees	Bikini girl	TV film

Music videos
Year	Title	Artist	Role
2010	The Animal	Disturbed	Self
