= Kristal Marshall =

American model and professional wrestler (born 1983)

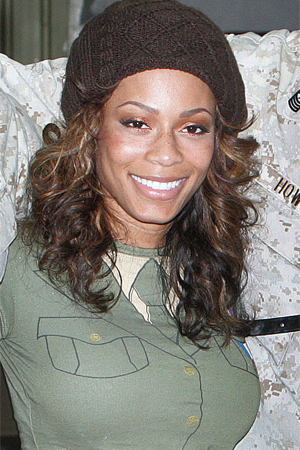
- Marshall in 2006

Personal information
- Born: Kristal Melisa Marshall; November 11, 1983 (age 42) Los Angeles, California, U.S.
- Life partner: Bobby Lashley (2007–2010)
- Children: 2

Professional wrestling career
- Ring name(s): Kristal; Kristal Lashley; Kristal Marshall
- Billed height: 5 ft 5 in (1.65 m)
- Billed weight: 120 lb (54 kg)
- Trained by: Deep South Wrestling; Bill DeMott; Dave Finlay; Jillian Hall
- Debut: December 2, 2005
- Retired: 2013

Kristal Melisa Marshall (born November 11, 1983) is an American-Barbadian model, beauty queen and retired professional wrestler who is best known for her time in World Wrestling Entertainment on its SmackDown brand and in Total Nonstop Action Wrestling (TNA).

== Modeling career ==
Prior to working for World Wrestling Entertainment (WWE) Marshall appeared as a competitor in the 2004 Miss California pageant, as a model for Deal or No Deal, in music videos for 50 Cent and Ma$e, and in commercials for The Best Damn Sports Show Period. She was at one time a Barker Beauty on The Price Is Right.

== Professional wrestling career ==
=== World Wrestling Entertainment (2005–2007) ===
Marshall first entered WWE as a contestant in the 2005 Raw Diva Search, in which she eventually finished fourth. Despite not winning the Diva Search contract, Marshall was signed to a development deal soon after the contest finished and sent to Deep South Wrestling, WWE newest "farm territory" at that time. In December 2005, she joined the SmackDown! roster as a backstage correspondent, interviewing the brand's superstars during the shows.

Her first actual feud on the brand came against the heel run of Jillian Hall. Marshall defeated Hall in her debut match—a "Divas Uncovered" match—on the March 10, 2006, episode of SmackDown. On June 2, 2006, Kristal was defeated by Jillian Hall but was later comforted by the turned heel Michelle McCool. When Diva Search winner Ashley Massaro joined the SmackDown! brand, Marshall was turned heel and put into an angle where she was jealous of Massaro's Diva Search win. She was aligned with McCool and the two feuded with Massaro and then-babyface, Jillian Hall, leading to a Fatal Four-Way Bra and Panties match at The Great American Bash, during which Marshall was legitimately injured, though she did not miss any time. In September, the next years Diva Search winner, then-babyface, Layla El, arrived on the brand, and Marshall was put into a feud with her. This one had Marshall aligned with Mike "The Miz" Mizanin against Layla and the Boogeyman.

In February 2007, Marshall became a face again and began a storyline which had her as a close friend of then-babyface, Vickie Guerrero, who was mysteriously planning something, and then flirting with SmackDown! General Manager Theodore Long. After Marshall confessed her love for Long, she convinced him to hire Guerrero as his assistant, leaving her in charge of the show on occasion. Eventually Long proposed marriage, which Kristal accepted On August 26 at SummerSlam, Kristal participated in a battle royal to determine the No. 1 contender for the WWE Women's Championship, however, she was eliminated by McCool. On the September 21 episode of SmackDown!, during Kristal and Long's in-ring wedding, Long suffered a heart attack as part of the storyline. She was released from her WWE contract a few weeks later.

=== Total Nonstop Action Wrestling (2009–2010) ===
On October 18, 2009, at Total Nonstop Action Wrestling's Bound for Glory Marshall debuted as a member of the crowd cheering on Bobby Lashley during his match with Samoa Joe. Renamed Kristal Lashley, she was portrayed as the wife of her real-life boyfriend. She then started an angle with Scott Steiner where Steiner kept harassing her in the crowd during his and Lashley's matches. On the November 5 edition of TNA Impact! Marshall accompanied Lashley to the ring but was sent backstage by the referee where Steiner would try to kidnap her but would get stopped by Lashley. She made her TNA in-ring debut on the December 12 edition of Impact! teaming with Lashley in a losing effort against Steiner and Awesome Kong in a mixed tag team match. On the January 4, 2010, Monday night edition of Impact! Bobby and Kristal Lashley requested for their kayfabe immediate release from TNA Wrestling, turning heel in the process. This storyline did not last, as Bobby Lashley was released from TNA in February to focus more on his MMA career.

=== Independent circuit (2013) ===
On April 19, 2013, at Top Rope Promotions (TRP), Kristal made her in-ring return when she teamed with Kong, as the two defeated Jillian Hall and Kasey Ray, in what would be Kristal last match to date.

== Other media ==
Marshall has appeared on an episode of Hogan Knows Best. She also appeared on the February 6, 2008, episode of Project Runway with Maria, Candice Michelle, Torrie Wilson, Layla, and Michelle McCool.

In June 2007, she posed for her first magazine cover, the September issue of African Americans on Wheels.

== Filmography ==
=== Film and television ===
| Year | Title | Role | Notes |
|---|---|---|---|
| 2005 | The Price is Right | Self; Barker's Beauty | 10 episodes |
| 2005 | Deal or no Deal | Briefcase model #5 | 5 episodes |
| 2005 | WWE 2005 Diva Search | Self; contestant | 4th place, 6 episodes |
| 2006 | WWE Divas Do New York | Self; model | Direct to DVD |
| 2006 | WWE Hall of Fame 2006 | Self; guest | TV special |
| 2006 | Hogan Knows Best season 2 | Self; guest | 1 episode |
| 2007 | WWE Hall of Fame 2007 | Self; guest | TV special |
| 2008 | Project Runway season 5 | Self; guest | 1 episode |
| 2017 | Blood Circus | Athena | |
| TBA | Romantic Retrievals | Lizette | Pre-production |
| TBA | The Martha's Vineyard Affair | Sarah Locke | Pre-production |

=== Music videos ===
| Year | Title | Artist | Role |
|---|---|---|---|
| 2005 | Candy Shop | 50 Cent feat. Olivia | Model |

== Personal life ==
Marshall dated Bobby Lashley from 2007 until 2010, and they have two children. In April 2010, Kristal confirmed on Twitter that she and Lashley had split.

She is of Barbadian descent.

== Championships and accomplishments ==
- Fitness Universe
  - Ms. Bikini America (Medium Class; 2008)
- NPC Arnold Amateur Championships
  - 2nd Place (Short Class; 2009)
- NPC USA Bodybuilding & Figure Championships
  - 1st Place (Class C & Overall; 2009)
