= Camille Anderson =

American actress

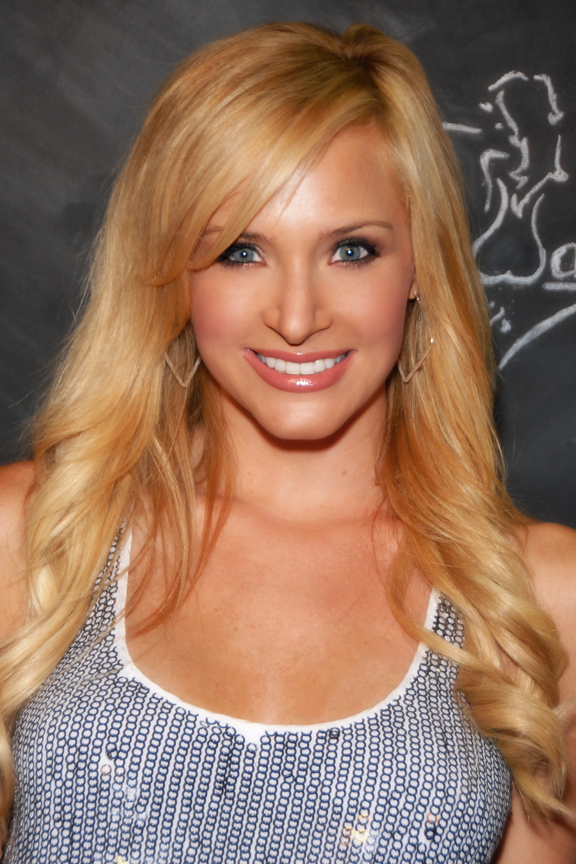
- Born: Camille Constance Anderson
- Occupations: Actress, model (person), television host, realtor
- Years active: 2000–present
- Known for: WWE Diva Search
- Website: www.camilleanderson.com

Camille Constance Anderson, is an American actress, model and television host, who is best known for holding the title of Miss Austin USA. She is also well known for taking part in the WWE 2004 RAW Diva Search.

== Early life ==
She held the title of Miss Austin USA in 1998, however, she left the beauty pageant circuit for an internship at Dateline NBC in New York, New York to complete her journalism degree.

== Modeling career ==
Anderson began her modeling career as a beauty pageant model, winning Miss Austin USA in 1998.

Anderson began appearing in commercials and in magazines, appearing in; Fitness RX, FHM, FM Concepts and Stuff. She also featured in FHM Australia "Hottest 100 Women in the World" list in 2007 placing 51st.

Anderson regularly posed for Bench Warmers trading cards, first posing in 2001.

== Television career ==
Anderson began her acting career as an extra appearing in television shows such as; Diagnosis Murder, Dharma & Greg and Regular Joe. She also landed several cameo's in films such as; Rock Star, Pauly Shore Is Dead and Intolerable Cruelty.

In 2004 Anderson was a contestant in WWE's 2004 Diva Search contest. She was the second contestant eliminated from the competition placing 9th overall.

In 2005 she landed a role in the film Wedding Crashers and made recurring appearances in television drama Las Vegas. Anderson also ventured in to hosting, she was a guest co-host at the 2005 G-Phoria event. She has also hosted multiple episodes of Selling Mega Mansions.

== Filmography ==
=== Film and television ===
Year	Title	Role	Notes
2000	Arrest & Trial	Tiffany	1 episode
2001	Diagnosis Murder	Nurse Blair Lawson	1 episode
2001	Wild On...	Self; guest host	1 episode
2001	Rock Star	Elevator hottie #1	Uncredited
2001	Dharma & Greg	Pete's girl	1 episode
2002	Oblivious	Student volunteer	1 episode
2002	The Man Show	Self; guest	1 episode
2002	Psychotic	Victim	
2003	Pauly Shore Is Dead	Michael Madsen's girl	
2003	Trash to Cash with John DiResta	Self; guest	1 episode
2003	Sketch Pad	Suzie	TV film
2003	Sketch Pad 2	Suzie	TV film
2003	Regular Joe	Pretty girl	1 episode
2003	Intolerable Cruelty	Santa Fe Tart	
2004	Average Joe: Adam Returns	Self; contestant	1 episode
2004	The Sports List	Self; guest speaker	1 episode
2004	WWE RAW Diva Search Casting Special	Self; contestant	TV special
2004	WWE 2004 RAW Diva Search	Self; contestant	9th place, 3 episodes
2004	The Screen Savers	Self; guest	1 episode
2004	That '70s Show	Coffee shop girl	1 episode
2004	The John Henson Project	Otter	1 episode
2005	Bench Warmer: Behind the Scenes	Self; model	Direct to DVD
2005	Wedding Crashers	Camille	
2005	G-Phoria 2005	Self; guest co-host	TV special
2005	Poorman's Bikini Beach	Self; guest co-host	1 episode
2005–2007	Las Vegas	Multiple roles	5 episodes
2005–2009	Get Out	Self; model	20 episodes
2008	The John Kerwin Show	Self; guest	1 episode
2009	Frat Party	Madison	
2012	The Doctors	Self; guest	1 episode
2012	Q N' A with Mikki and Shay	Self; guest	1 episode
2013	Slightly Single in L.A.	Melissa	Associate producer
2017	Selling Mega Mansions	Self; guest host	2 episodes
2018	The Lowlife Show	Self; guest	1 episode
2020	Endangered Rangers	Self; guest	Documentary
