= Pauly Shore Is Dead =

American mockumentary

- Theatrical release poster
- Directed by: Pauly Shore
- Written by: Kirk Fox; Pauly Shore
- Produced by: Pauly Shore
- Starring: Pauly Shore; Ashley L. Anderson; Pamela Anderson; Camille Anderson; Adam Sandler; Eminem; Charlie Sheen; Ben Stiller
- Production company: Regent Releasing
- Distributed by: 20th Century Fox
- Release dates: January 2003 (Slamdunk Film Festival); October 4, 2004 (United States)
- Running time: 82 minutes
- Language: English
- Box office: $11,000

Pauly Shore Is Dead is a 2003 American mockumentary comedy film directed, produced, co-written by, and starring Pauly Shore. The film is depicted as a semi-autobiographical retelling of Shore's early success and dwindling popularity in the late 1990s, after which it documents Shore's (fictional) attempt to fake his own death in order to drum up popularity for his films. It features many cameos.

== Plot ==
The film begins as an autobiographical look at Shore's early professional successes on MTV and as the star of a series of '90s comedies. Shore's film career leads to his taking a starring role in a vehicle on the Fox Network, in which he plays the slacker son of a millionaire. The pilot of the series turns out to be a commercial and critical failure, and Shore becomes a pariah virtually overnight, with his friends distancing themselves from him for fear that it will tarnish their own careers. Shore is ultimately reduced to living in his mother's attic and watching BackDoor Sluts 9 starring his ex-girlfriend, who will no longer see him. He spends his last $84 on a hooker—who does almost nothing for him and his life simply gets worse and worse.

One night, Shore is visited by the ghost of his mentor, comic Sam Kinison, who encourages Shore to fake his own death as a means of revitalizing popularity in Pauly Shore films and merchandise. Shore decides to go through with the plan, which initially works: Once word of his "death" breaks, celebrities eager for the residual publicity begin appearing on television in large numbers to declare Shore a comic genius and lament his early death. Shore, eager to bask in the publicity, begins appearing in public wearing a disguise; he is quickly outed, arrested, and sent to prison.

In prison, Shore is attacked by one of his former fans, "Bucky from Kentucky," a redneck whose world view was shattered when he learned that Shore had willingly put his own fans through the ordeal of thinking he was dead. Shore survives the attack, which causes him to realize that even though he was no longer as famous as he once was, he still had fans who loved him. Shore and Bucky have a heart-to-heart about the nature of celebrity, and Shore decides to start his career over.

After getting out of prison, Shore sets about making Pauly Shore Is Dead to chronicle his own rise and fall, using information he has gathered from years in Hollywood to blackmail various B-list celebrities into appearing in cameos; he reserves the information he has on A-list celebrities for the planned sequel.

== Cast ==
- Pauly Shore as himself and Bucky's Cousin
- W. Earl Brown as Bucky from Kentucky
- Kristin Herold as Bucky's Cousin
- David Kersey as Bucky Jr.
- Miriam Cohen Kiel as Bucky's Daughter
- Kelly Kursten as Bucky's wife
- Timmy Jamieson as Sam Kinison
- Clint Howard as Pauly's Business Manager
- Bobby Lee as Delivery Boy
- Jason Mewes as Robert Francesco
- Christopher Penn as Half of Gay Couple in Jail
- Sam Rubin as Michael Figliolia
- Lala Sloatman as Hooker In loft
- Marilyn Martinez as The Housekeeper

As themselves

- Pamela Anderson
- A. J. Benza
- B-Real
- Todd Bridges
- Tommy Chong
- Carson Daly
- Ellen DeGeneres
- Jewel De'Nyle
- Dustin Diamond
- Andy Dick
- Dr. Dre
- Jerry Dunphy
- Eminem
- Fred Durst
- Sully Erna
- Perry Farrell
- Corey Feldman
- Heidi Fleiss
- Natasha Henstridge
- Nicky Hilton
- Paris Hilton
- Dexter Holland
- Kato Kaelin
- Craig Kilborn
- Sam Kinison (archive footage)
- Carl LaBove
- Tommy Lee
- Kurt Loder
- Mario López
- Michael Madsen
- Bill Maher
- Pat O'Brien
- Nancy O'Dell
- Sean Penn
- Matt Pinfield
- Proof
- Sally Jessy Raphael
- Chris Rock
- Ja Rule
- Cadillac Tah
- Adam Sandler (voice)
- Charlie Sheen
- Tiffany Shepis
- Snoop Dogg
- Britney Spears
- Ben Stiller
- Tom Sizemore
- Verne Troyer

== Release ==
Pauly Shore Is Dead received mixed reviews, with a 50% rating on Rotten Tomatoes based on 12 reviews. The film earned $11,000 after a very limited release to theaters in Sacramento, California. It won the Audience Choice Award from the Slamdunk Film Festival (for Shore's direction).
