= Rebecca DiPietro =

American former model and WWE Diva

Personal information
- Born: April 14, 1979 (age 47) Rehoboth, Massachusetts, U.S.

Professional wrestling career
- Ring name: Rebecca DiPietro
- Billed height: 5 ft 5 in (1.65 m)
- Billed weight: 125.6 lb (57.0 kg)
- Trained by: Deep South Wrestling
- Debut: October 17, 2006
- Retired: March 22, 2007

Rebecca DiPietro, (born April 14, 1979), is an American model and WWE Diva. She is best known for her time with the World Wrestling Entertainment (WWE) as a backstage interviewer on WWE's ECW brand and for taking part in the WWE 2006 Diva Search. She also posed for Playboy magazine in 2001.

== Modeling career ==
In 2001 DiPietro appeared in Playboy magazine. She appeared again in the June 2004 edition as the Playboy Cybergirl of the Week; the same edition WWE Divas Sable and Torrie Wilson were on the cover.

DiPietro has also appeared in Maxim magazine and on the cover of Stuff magazine. She won the USA title for Miss Hawaiian Tropic in 2005 and won the Miss MET-RX model search contest in 2008.

== Professional wrestling career ==
In 2006 DiPietro was a contestant in the WWE 2006 Diva Search, where she placed 6th overall. She was eliminated on the July 31 episode of RAW, but was hired by the WWE just four days later.

After being hired by the WWE she began training at WWE's developmental territory Deep South Wrestling. She made her Deep South Wrestling debut on September 3, 2006 in a backstage segment with Matt Striker, she began working as the backstage interviewer for Deep South Wrestling. In October 2006 DiPietro began making appearances at ECW house shows in bikini contests against fellow ECW Divas; Amy Zidian, Francine, Kelly Kelly & Trinity. On the October 17, 2006 episode of ECW she made her official main roster debut as the backstage interviewer of the ECW brand. She made an appearance at the 2006 Cyber Sunday pay-per-view as a lumberjill for the WWE Women's Championship match, she also appeared at the 2006 December to Dismember pay-per-view as the backstage interviewer. On March 22, 2007, upon her request, DiPietro was granted her release from the WWE.

== Personal life ==
DiPietro briefly dated WWE superstar Batista in 2006.

== Filmography ==
Film and television
Year	Title	Role	Notes
1997	Wild On...	Self; model	2 episodes
2003	Bikini Destinations	Self; model	2 episodes
2006	Mystical Journeys: The Search for Miss Mystique	Self; model	Direct to DVD
2006	WWE 2006 Diva Search	Self; contestant	6th place, 4 episodes
2007	World's Sexiest Nude Women	Self; model	Direct to DVD
