= Layla El =

English retired professional wrestler, dancer, and model (born 1977)

Layla
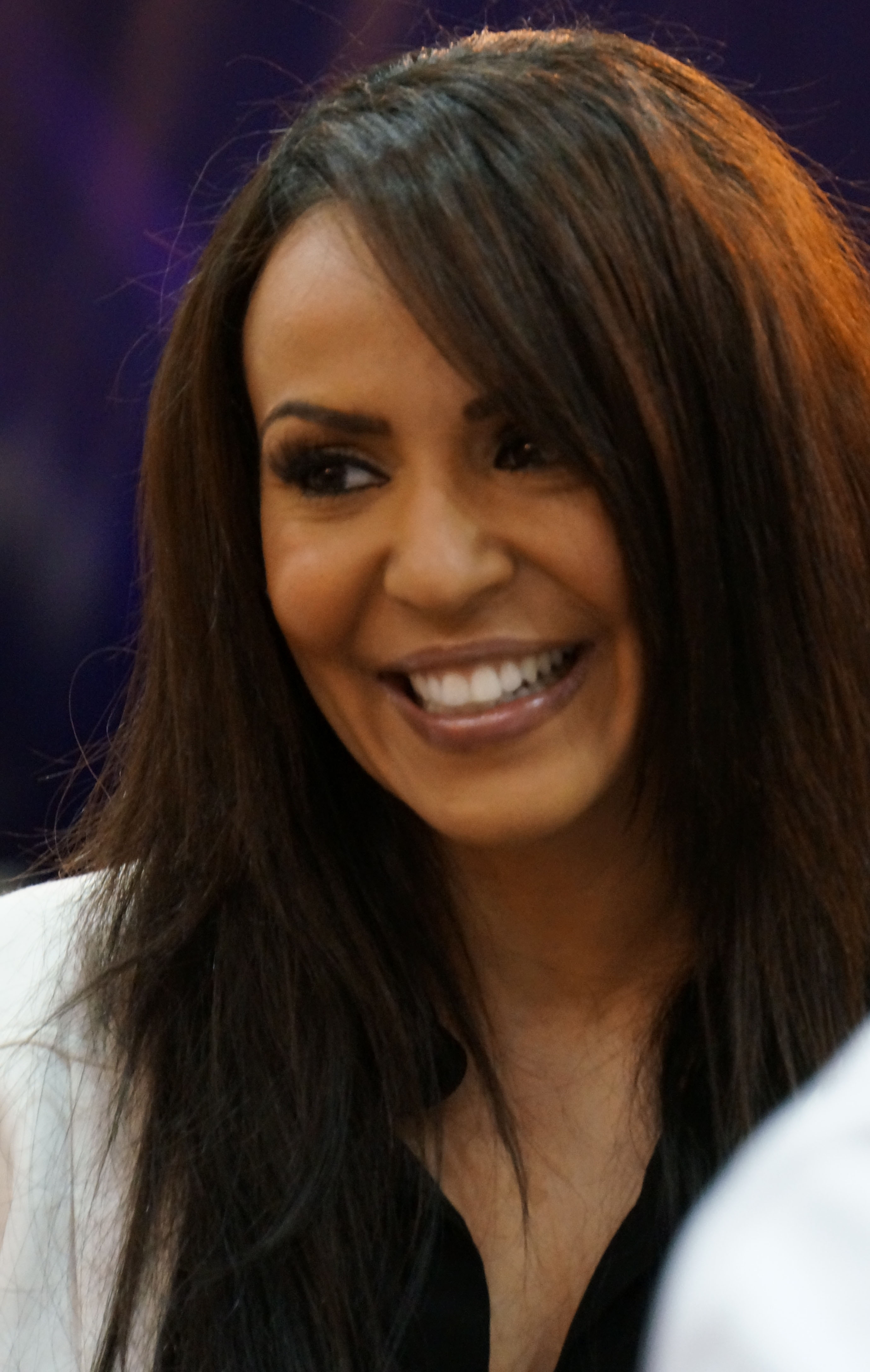
- Layla in 2014

Personal information
- Nationality: English
- Born: Layla El; 25 June 1977 (age 49) London, England
- Spouse: Ricky Ortiz (m. 2015; div. 2025)
- Children: 1

Professional wrestling career
- Ring name(s): Layla; Layla El
- Billed from: Miami, Florida
- Trained by: Jesse Hernandez; Dave Finlay
- Debut: 16 August 2006
- Retired: 27 July 2015

Layla El (born 25 June 1977) is an English retired professional wrestler, dancer and model. She is best known for her tenure in WWE, under the mononymous ring name Layla. She danced for Carnival Cruise Lines, the Miami Heat franchise of the National Basketball Association, and Kanye West during his performance at the MTV Video Music Awards before becoming a contestant on the 2006 edition of WWE's Diva Search, which she won to earn a contract with the company.

Initially appearing on the SmackDown brand, El moved to ECW in January 2007. There, she formed the Extreme Exposé dance troupe with Kelly Kelly and Brooke Adams. In 2008, she was drafted to the Raw brand, where she began managing William Regal. The following year, she returned to SmackDown and formed an alliance with Michelle McCool known as LayCool. In May 2010, she won the WWE Women's Championship for the first time. She is the first British woman and the first Diva Search winner to hold the championship, and was the final champion when the title was retired in 2010. In April 2012, she won the WWE Divas Championship upon her return from a year-long absence due to injury, and held it until September that year. She then wrestled for the next three years until her retirement in 2015.

== Early life ==
Layla El was born and raised in London, England on 25 June 1977. Her paternal grandparents were Spanish, and she is also of Moroccan descent. She attended a performing arts college in London.

== Dancing career ==
El relocated to the United States to begin her professional dancing career, becoming a dancer for Carnival Cruise Lines. Afterwards, she joined the National Basketball Association's Miami Heat franchise, where she danced for two years beginning in 2004. As part of the Miami Heat dance troupe, she received a championship ring. During this time, she appeared on-stage with John Legend as one of his backup dancers. She also danced for P. Diddy and Kanye West at the MTV Video Music Awards.

== Professional wrestling career ==
=== World Wrestling Entertainment/WWE (2006–2015) ===
==== Diva Search and early appearances (2006–2007) ====
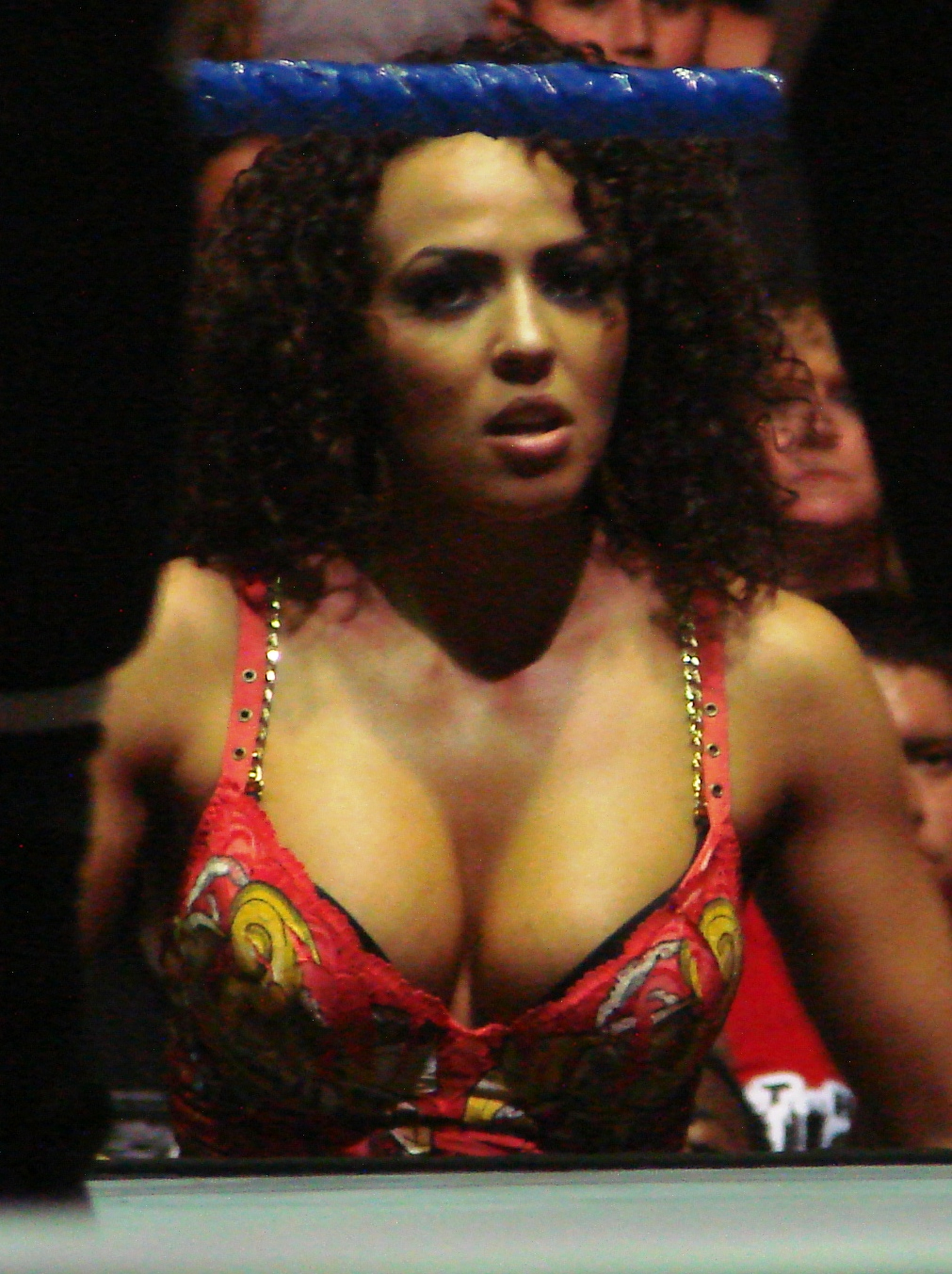
Layla at an event for WWE SmackDown! in 2007

El's first foray into professional wrestling occurred when her trainer suggested she try out for the $250,000 WWE Diva Search contest in 2006. After a casting call, she was selected as one of the finalists. During the contest, she won two individual competitions, an obstacle course and a talent competition, before winning the overall competition on 16 August.

She made her first official WWE appearance at the 2006 SummerSlam pay-per-view in a backstage segment with several other Divas. During the segment, the other women initially taunted and teased her before revealing that "it was all in fun" and part of an "initiation". The week after SummerSlam, El made her debut as a member of the SmackDown! brand in an interview with Mike "The Miz" Mizanin—although he did not allow her the chance to say much, spending most of the time talking about himself. Subsequently, she did not appear on television for almost a month, reappearing on the 22 September episode of SmackDown! and getting into a confrontation with Kristal and Jillian Hall.

At October's No Mercy pay-per-view event, she embarrassed The Miz by tricking him into getting a lap dance from Big Dick Johnson while he was blindfolded and expecting it to be from her as a birthday gift. On 20 October, Layla participated in a dance contest with the other SmackDown! Divas, and was chosen as the winner by the judges, Nick and Aaron Carter. Despite this, The Miz, who was acting as emcee, declared Kristal the winner. The following week, Layla made her in-ring debut in a Diva's battle royal. The match ended in controversial fashion when she was pulled from the ring apron by The Miz, allowing Kristal to win. The following week, Layla teamed with Big Vito in a loss to The Miz and Kristal in a mixed tag team match. Continuing to feud with Kristal, Layla had her singles match debut on the 1 December episode of SmackDown!, when she lost to Kristal. In her final match for the SmackDown! brand, Layla teamed with Ashley to defeat Kristal and Jillian Hall in a tag team match on 22 December.

==== Extreme Exposé and managing William Regal (2007–2009) ====
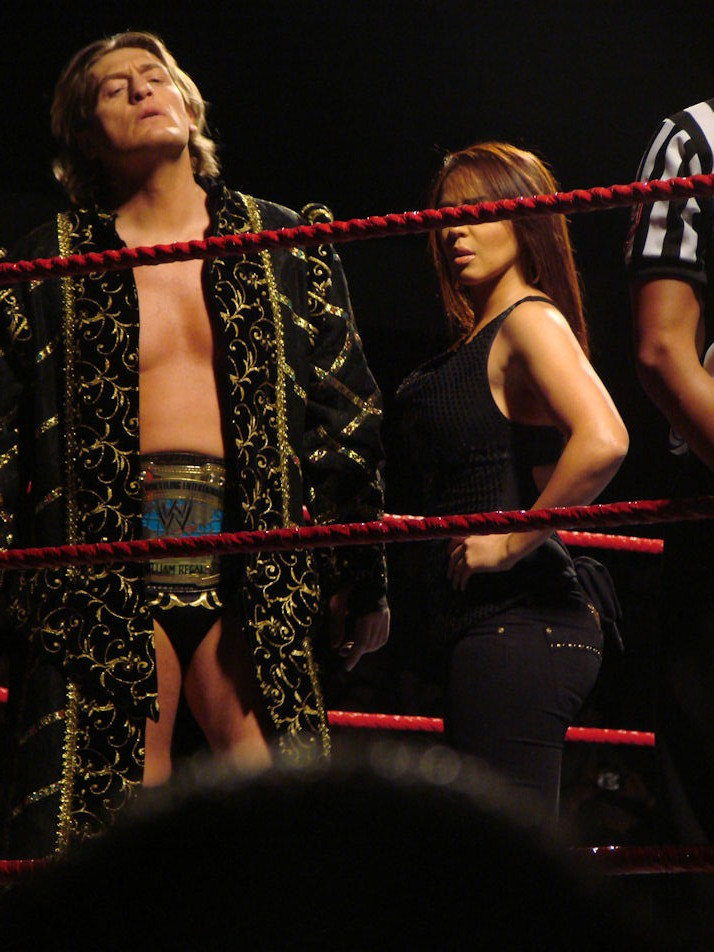
Layla with Intercontinental Champion William Regal in January 2009

The following month, Layla was moved to the ECW brand, debuting on 23 January 2007. She joined Brooke and Kelly Kelly to form Extreme Exposé. The trio performed a weekly dance segment on ECW, choreographed by Layla, for the next several months. In June 2007, The Miz was moved to the brand, prompting a storyline in which all three members of Extreme Exposé were attracted to him.

When Kelly shifted her attentions towards Balls Mahoney, Layla, Brooke, and Miz openly mocked her, turning Layla and Brooke into villainous characters. On 1 November, Brooke was released from her WWE contract, and Extreme Exposé dissolved as a group, leaving Kelly and Layla to enter an ongoing rivalry with more active in-ring roles. They were on opposite sides of a 10-Diva tag team match at Survivor Series, which Layla's team lost. In December, Layla formed an alliance with Victoria, which expanded to include Lena Yada in January 2008, and the trio continued to feud with Kelly. In April, Layla was part of the winning team in a six-on-six Divas match at the Backlash pay-per-view.

As part of the 2008 supplemental draft in late June, Layla was drafted to the Raw brand. On the 7 July episode of Raw, Layla made her debut in a tag team match with Jillian Hall, losing to Mickie James and Kelly Kelly, the latter of whom had also moved to the Raw brand. She soon entered a storyline with Jamie Noble in which Noble attempted to impress her with his matches, only to be easily defeated by his opponents. On 1 September, Noble was able to defeat William Regal, which impressed Layla. The following week, however, Layla chose to align herself with Regal, after he defeated Noble in a rematch. On the following episode of Raw, Layla reinforced her decision, telling Noble that she had finally found a worthy man in Regal. Over the next few months, Layla competed only sporadically in matches, spending most of her time managing Regal, and was present at ringside when Regal defeated Santino Marella on 10 November to win the WWE Intercontinental Championship.

==== LayCool (2009–2011) ====
On 15 April 2009, Layla was drafted to the SmackDown brand as part of the Supplemental Draft. She began a feud with Eve Torres, and lost both a dance contest and an arm wrestling match, before losing a match to her on the 29 May episode of SmackDown. The rivalry ended after Torres defeated Layla again on WWE Superstars on 18 June.

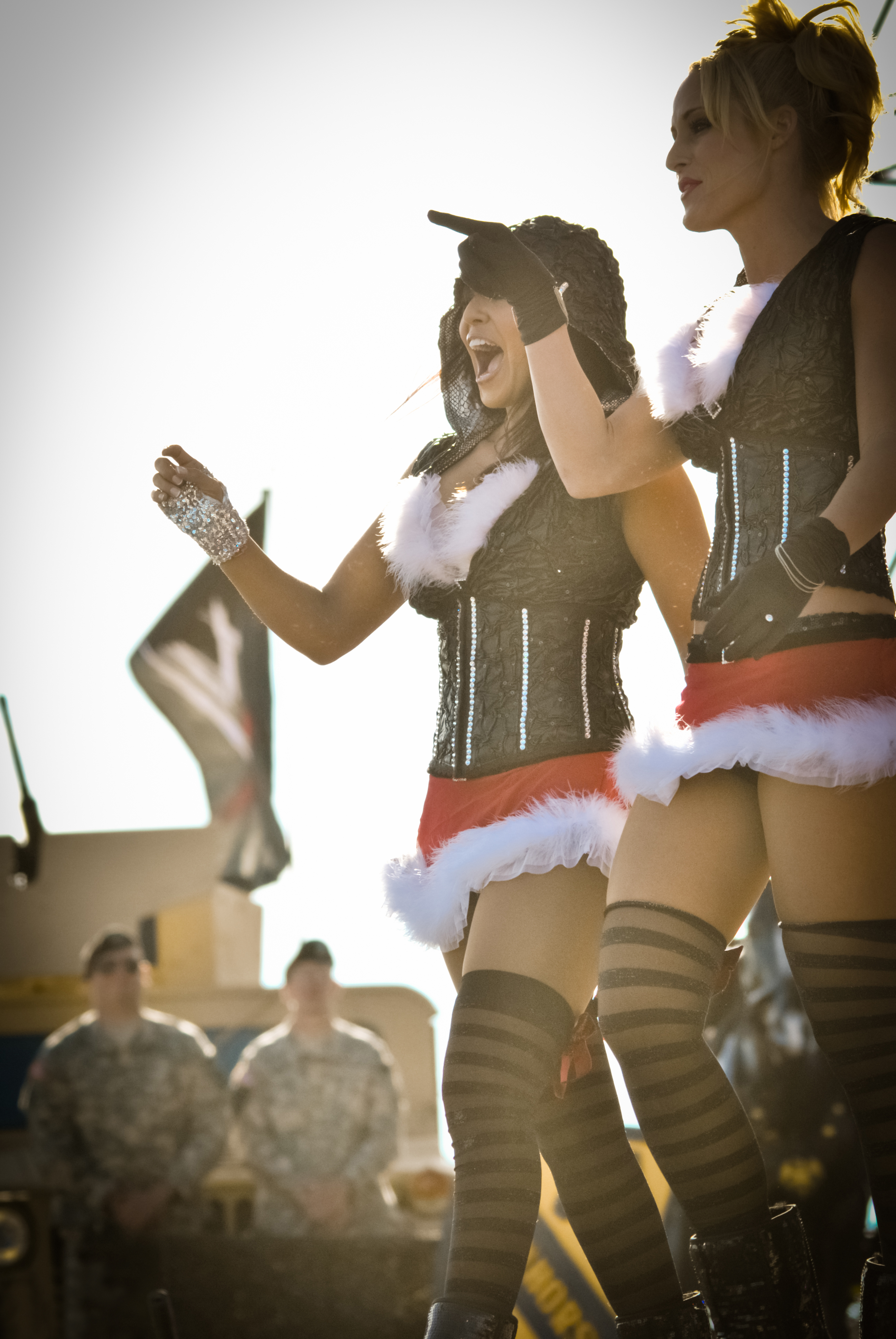
Layla (left) with Michelle McCool as LayCool at Tribute to the Troops in December 2010

She then formed an alliance with Michelle McCool, later called LayCool. They began a scripted feud with Mickie James in October, mocking of her weight and vowing to make her leave SmackDown. At the Survivor Series pay-per-view, McCool's team lost to James' team. At TLC, Layla interfered in the WWE Women's Championship match between McCool and James and helped McCool retain the title. In January 2010, at Royal Rumble, Layla came out in a fatsuit, mocking James prior to the title match between McCool and James; however, the mockery backfired, as James attacked Layla and used that as a distraction to quickly defeat McCool to win the championship. On the 12 February episode of SmackDown, Layla and McCool defeated James in a handicap match made by Official SmackDown Consultant Vickie Guerrero, who had been accidentally humiliated by James backstage. Guerrero then began managing LayCool, accompanying them to the ring and regularly interfering in their matches. At the Elimination Chamber pay-per-view, Layla and McCool defeated Raw's Gail Kim and Maryse in an inter-brand Divas tag team match. At WrestleMania XXVI she was on the winning team in a 10-Diva tag team match.

LayCool faced the WWE Women's Champion Beth Phoenix in a two-on-one handicap match on the 14 May episode of SmackDown. Layla pinned Phoenix to win the Women's Championship for the first time, becoming the first British woman to hold the title. She is also the first Diva Search winner to have won the championship. Following her win, LayCool began calling themselves the co-Women's Champions. On 18 July, Layla had her first title defense when she defeated Kelly Kelly at the Money in the Bank pay-per-view. On 30 July, SmackDown General Manager Theodore Long informed LayCool there was only one Women's Champion, and they had a week to decide who it would be. The following week, LayCool revealed that they had cut the title belt into two, turning it into a friendship charm and circumventing Long's orders. In September, Layla and McCool challenged WWE Divas Champion Melina to a championship unification match at Night of Champions. McCool participated in the match and won, with Layla's help, to unify both titles into the WWE Unified Divas Championship. Layla unofficially became the co-champion, and defended the title against Melina the following night on Raw. After both members of LayCool had successfully defended the title against Natalya, they faced her in a two-on-one handicap match at Survivor Series, which Natalya won to become the new Divas Champion. Following Survivor Series, Natalya and Phoenix formed an alliance to continue the feud with LayCool, and at the TLC in December, LayCool lost to them in the first Diva's tag team tables match in WWE. LayCool invoked their rematch clause in January 2011, prompting the scheduling of a two-on-one handicap match for the Royal Rumble. At the event however, the anonymous Raw General Manager altered the match to a fatal four-way, also involving Eve Torres who went on to win the title.

Dissension between Layla and McCool began to show following the loss of the Divas Championship, and the two appeared in a series of vignettes in which they were attending couples therapy. On the 22 April episode of SmackDown, McCool attacked Layla during one of their storyline therapy sessions. During the 2011 WWE Draft on 25 April, Layla lost a match to Eve and was attacked afterward by McCool, but was able to fight her off. On 29 April, the pair faced each other in a match, which ended in a double countout. As a result, the pair faced each other in a no countout, no disqualification, loser leaves WWE match at Extreme Rules on 1 May, which Layla won.

Layla announced that she had suffered a knee injury at Extreme Rules on SmackDown on 13 May, and was interrupted and attacked by Kharma to write her off television. Later that month, it was confirmed that Layla had legitimately torn both her Anterior cruciate and Medial collateral ligaments, and required surgery.

==== Divas Champion, various feuds and retirement (2012–2015) ====
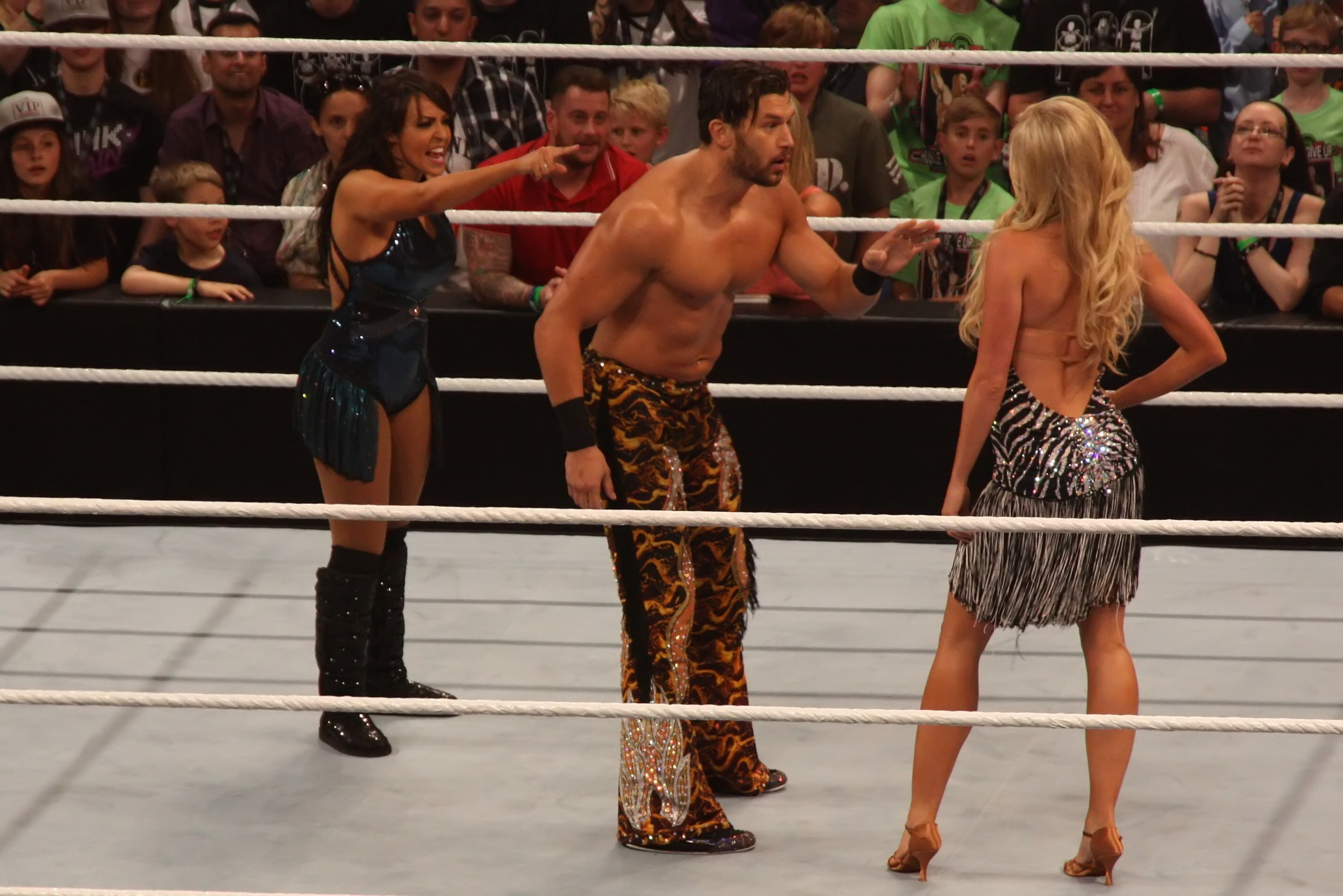
Layla and Fandango being confronted by Summer Rae (right) in May 2014

Layla made her in-ring return at a Florida Championship Wrestling event on 22 March 2012. She made her return to the main WWE roster at the Extreme Rules pay-per-view on 29 April, replacing Beth Phoenix, who was not medically cleared to compete, in a match for the WWE Divas Championship. Despite interference from Brie Bella, Layla defeated Nikki Bella to win the WWE Divas Championship for the first time. Her victory made her the first Diva Search winner to have won both the Divas and the Women's championship. The following night on Raw, she successfully defended the championship against both Bella Twins in a triple threat match, and retained twice against Beth Phoenix at the Over the Limit and No Way Out pay-per-views in May and June respectively. On the 20 August episode of Raw, Kaitlyn won a battle royal to become the number one contender to Layla's Divas Championship. At Night of Champions, Kaitlyn was removed from the championship match following a storyline injury and replaced with Eve Torres. Torres defeated Layla to win the championship, ending her reign at 140 days.

Layla defeated Torres in a non-title match on Superstars to earn a title match. She unsuccessfully challenged for the championship on 15 October, and failed again to regain the championship in a three-way match at Hell in a Cell, which also involved Kaitlyn. On 12 November, on Raw, Layla was defeated by Kaitlyn in a number one contenders match for the championship. On 16 December at the Tables, Ladders & Chairs pay-per-view, Layla competed in a number one contender's "Santa's Little Helpers" battle royal to face Torres for the championship, but was unsuccessful. In early 2013, Layla briefly developed a feud with Tamina Snuka, losing to her in singles matches before defeating her in a tag team match. As part of the feud, Layla allied herself with Kaitlyn, and began accompanying her to ringside. On the 2 August episode of SmackDown, Layla stopped Kaitlyn from spearing AJ Lee, costing Kaitlyn both the match and the Divas Championship, and left with AJ, turning heel in the process. Layla went on to defeat Kaitlyn in singles competition and in a tag team match with AJ as her partner. In late 2013, Layla took a hiatus from WWE. She returned at a non-televised event on 14 March 2014, and made her television return the following week on an episode of Main Event, where she and Alicia Fox lost to The Funkadactyls (Naomi and Cameron). Layla participated in the Divas Invitational match for the WWE Divas Championship at WrestleMania XXX which was won by AJ.

The following week, she replaced Summer Rae as Fandango's dancer and valet, and quickly became embroiled in a feud with Emma and Santino Marella. In May, Layla entered a tournament to determine the new NXT Women's Champion, but lost to Natalya in the first round. Rae returned on 19 May, attacking Layla. Competing over Fandango's affections, Layla and Rae repeatedly attacked each other, prompting a match at Money in the Bank with Fandango as the special guest referee; Layla won the match. During a rematch in July on SmackDown, Layla and Rae attacked Fandango, before dancing with each other. Starting at Battleground, the pair formed an alliance, distracting Fandango during his matches and causing him to lose. In their first match as a team, Layla and Rae, now calling themselves the Slayers, lost to Paige and AJ Lee on the 18 July episode of SmackDown. The Slayers won their first match as a team on Main Event on 2 September, where they defeated Rosa Mendes and Natalya. The Slayers were part of Team Paige at Survivor Series in November, but both were eliminated and their team lost the match.

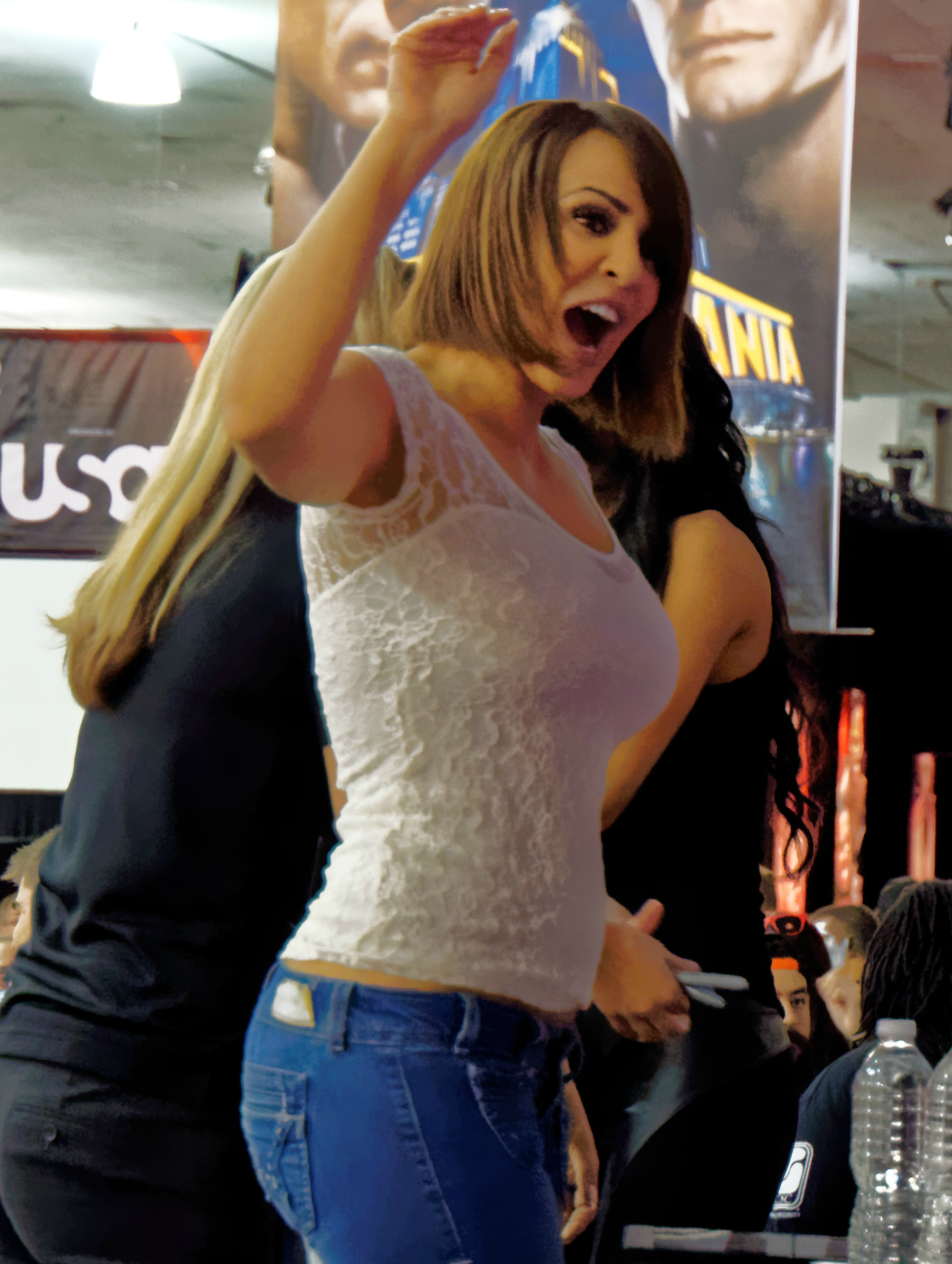
Layla El in 2015

In January 2015, El underwent surgery for unknown reasons. Layla returned on the 14 April episode of Main Event, where she defeated Emma in a singles match.

After three more months of competing mainly on Main Event, Superstars, and house shows, WWE announced on 29 July that Layla had decided to retire from professional wrestling. She revealed in an interview that she took the decision because she felt the road was rough for her at the age of 38 despite signing a three-year contract in July 2025.

== Modeling career ==
Since winning the Diva Search contest El has also done some modelling work. She has been featured in the magazines King, Smooth, and was the cover-girl for the first issue of Liquid. She also posed for FHM with the other members of Extreme Exposé. Layla, along with Beth Phoenix and Candice Michelle, appeared in the February 2009 issue of Flex Magazine.

== Other media ==
In April 2007, El and several other WWE Divas appeared in the music video for "Throw It On Me" by Timbaland and The Hives. During the week of 5 November 2007, she appeared on five episodes of Family Feud with other WWE wrestlers. On 6 February 2008 she appeared on Project Runway with several WWE Divas as part of the week's challenge. El also appeared on the 13 April 2008 episode of Celebrity Fit Club Boot Camp as a trainer. She appeared as a guest judge on an episode of Cupcake Wars alongside Alicia Fox.

In 2012, she ranked number 95 in Maxim's Hot 100.

LayTalk

YouTube information
- Channel: Lay Talk Podcast with Layla El
- Years active: 2026-present
- Genre: Podcast
- Subscribers: 5.44 thousands
- Views: 188,832
- Last updated: 17 November 2026

Layla has appeared in six WWE video games, making her in-game debut in SmackDown vs. Raw 2009. Layla also appears in, SmackDown vs. Raw 2011 as DLC, WWE '12, WWE '13 as DLC, WWE 2K14 and WWE 2K16.

On 29 September 2026, Layla has launched her own podcast named LayTalk on YouTube, with Kelly Kelly being her first guest.

== Personal life ==
El resides in Phoenix, Arizona, having previously lived in London, England, Miami, Florida, and Los Angeles, California.

El's mother died in August 2008, at the age of 48, of breast cancer, after suffering from it three times in two decades. In October 2012, El appeared in a commercial from the WWE and Susan G. Komen for the Cure to promote awareness for finding a cure for breast cancer. She incorporated infinity symbols on her wrestling attire as a tribute to her mother.

El was married to American football player and professional wrestler Richard Young, known as Ricky Ortiz, in November 2015, but the two split in 2024, and divorced in 2025 when a fan asked about the status of the two via an Instagram comment. Layla herself has stated this as well on a podcast. During an interview with Chris Van Vliet in June 2026, El revealed that she gave birth to a daughter in 2022.

== Filmography ==
Year	Title	Role	Notes	Source
2007	Family Feud	Herself	"WWE Superstars vs Divas" (5 episodes)	
2008	Project Runway	Herself	"Raw Talent" (season 4, episode 10)	
2008	Celebrity Fit Club Boot Camp	Herself	Season 6; trainer	
2013	Cupcake Wars	Herself	Season 9, episode 3; special guest judge	
2015	Total Divas	Herself	Season 3, episode 12; guest	

Podcasts
Year	Title	Role	Notes
2021	Ring The Belle	Herself	1 episode

List of music video performances
Year	Artist	Title	Source
2007	Timbaland ft. The Hives	"Throw It On Me"	

== Championships and accomplishments ==
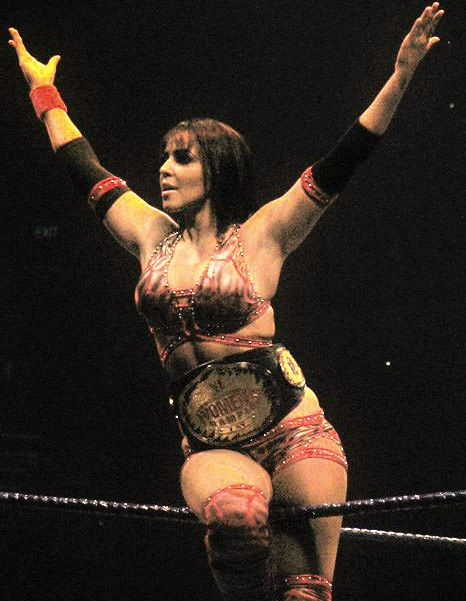
Layla as the final WWE Women's Champion in 2010.

=== Cheerleading ===
- National Basketball Association
  - Championship ring (1 time)

=== Professional wrestling ===
- Pro Wrestling Illustrated
  - Ranked No. 6 of the top 50 female wrestlers in the PWI Female 50 in 2012
- World Wrestling Entertainment / WWE
  - WWE Divas Championship (1 time)
  - WWE Women's Championship (1 time, final)
  - WWE Diva Search (2006)
  - Slammy Award ( 1 time)
    - Knucklehead Moment of the Year (2010) – Lay-Cool loses to Mae Young — with Michelle McCool
