= El Grande Americano =

Masked professional wrestling character

- WWE and AAA character
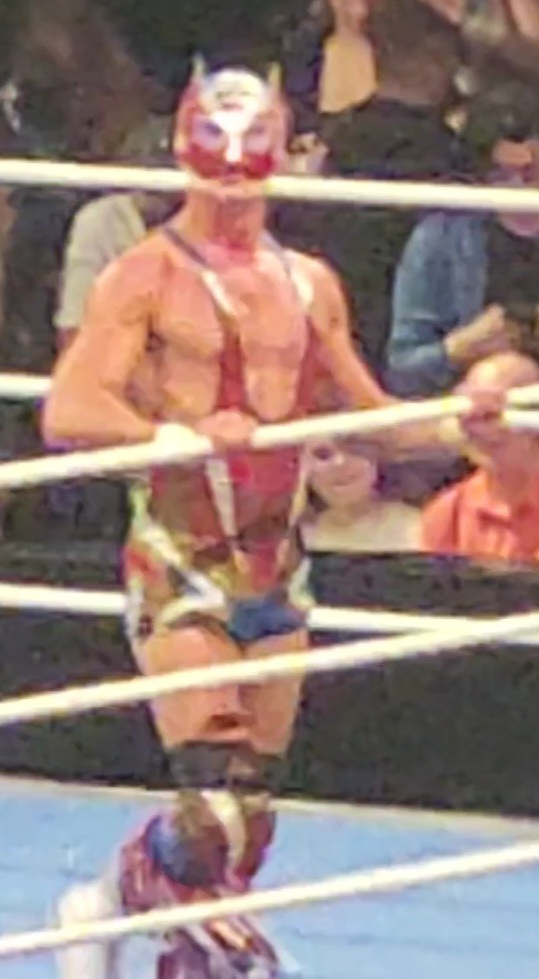
- Ludwig Kaiser as El Grande Americano in August 2025
- First appearance: WWE Raw; March 10, 2025
- Portrayed by: Chad Gable (2025–2026); Ludwig Kaiser (2025–present)

In-universe information
- Origin: Gulf of Mexico; Gulf of America; Tangamandapio, Mexico
- Height: 6 ft 3 in
- Weight: 220 lb

El Grande Americano (Spanish For "the Great American") is a professional wrestling character in the American professional wrestling promotion WWE and its Mexican subsidiary Lucha Libre AAA Worldwide (AAA). The gimmick debuted in WWE in March 2025 and was originally portrayed by Chad Gable until June, when the character was taken over by Ludwig Kaiser after Gable was sidelined with an injury. Kaiser's Americano then began to also appear in AAA that July. He is the current AAA Mega Champion in his first reign.

The character is a former one-time and longest-reigning WWE Speed Champion at 190 days, which was originally won by Gable's Americano, who held it for 56 days before it transferred to Kaiser when he took over the character upon Gable's injury and held it for 134 days. (Note: WWE officially recognizes the total reign as 188 days with Gable's portion lasting 54 days due to the episode of Speed where he won the title airing on tape delay.) After Gable returned from injury in January 2026 as "The Original" El Grande Americano, he and Kaiser feuded until Kaiser defeated Gable in a Mask vs. Mask match at Noche de Los Grandes, with Gable forfeiting the character to Kaiser.

== History ==
In January 2025, American WWE wrestler Chad Gable lost to various luchadores and embarked on a "quest" to learn the ways of lucha libre. On the March 10 episode of Raw, Gable, under an American-themed luchador mask, attacked Dragon Lee and Rey Mysterio. The character was officially named El Grande Americano two weeks later on Raw. As Americano, Gable won the WWE Speed Championship on May 5, 2025, which aired on tape delay on the May 7 episode of Speed. When Gable was sidelined with a legitimate rotator cuff injury in June, German WWE wrestler Ludwig Kaiser took over portrayal of the character. Kaiser's portrayal of Americano began appearing in WWE's Mexican subsidiary promotion Lucha Libre AAA Worldwide (AAA) in July, and eventually formed the Los Americanos stable alongside Rayo Americano and Bravo Americano. Kaiser also defended the WWE Speed Championship as Americano upon taking over the character, until losing it to Jasper Troy on the November 11 episode of NXT, ending Americano's total reign between Gable (56 days) and Kaiser (134 days) at a record-setting 190 days (188 days as recognized by WWE as the company recognizes that Gable held it for 54 days due to tape delay).

At Royal Rumble on January 31, 2026, Kaiser entered the Men's Royal Rumble match only to be eliminated by Gable, who returned from injury and was known as "The Original" El Grande Americano. They started an on-screen feud that culminated in a Máscara contra Máscara (mask versus mask) at Noche de Los Grandes on May 30, where Kaiser defeated Gable. After the match, Gable unmasked and relinquished the character to Kaiser, proclaiming that while Gable was "the original", going forward, Kaiser would be "the only" Americano. At Night 2 of Triplemanía 34 on September 13, Americano defeated Dominik Mysterio in a No Disqualification match to win the AAA Mega Championship.

== Reception ==
When Gable began to use the character, it drew significant criticism from Mexican audiences, who viewed the gimmick as a mockery of national wrestling traditions. While Gable's version was seen as a mockery to lucha libre, Kaiser's version was praised for the respect to Mexico and lucha libre tradition, introducing Mexican cultural references like singing "Cielito Lindo" during his entrance and being billed from Tangamandapio (in reference to Jaimito from El Chavo del Ocho), as well as being a fan of cultural icons, including singer Pedro Infante and luchador El Santo. Kaiser also spoke fluent Spanish as El Grande Americano, whereas Gable legitimately did not know Spanish.

After Kaiser took the character, he began to win over the Mexican audience. Before the Máscara contra Máscara match, a mural of El Grande Americano was drawn at Monterrey. Noah Club composed a corrido to honor El Grande Americano. The Máscara contra Máscara was highly praised. Pro wrestling journalist Dave Meltzer said it was "one of the great match presentations of all-time", and rated it 5¾ stars. In an article for La Jornada, both positive and negative impressions of the character were discussed. The match drew over 2 million viewers on YouTube, and was also made available on Netflix after the June 1 episode of Raw concluded. The mask that Kaiser wore was auctioned after the match for US$50,035.

== Championships and accomplishments ==
- Lucha Libre AAA Worldwide
  - AAA Mega Championship (1 time, current)
  - Rey de Reyes (2026)
- WWE
  - WWE Speed Championship (1 time)
