= NXT Revenge (2026) =

WWE television special

NXT: Revenge
- NXT Revenge logo
- Promotion: WWE
- Brand: NXT
- Date: April 14, 2026; April 21, 2026
- City: Orlando, Florida
- Venue: WWE Performance Center

NXT special episodes chronology
← Previous; New Year's Evil	Next → TBD

NXT: Revenge was a 2026 professional wrestling special event produced by WWE. It was the inaugural Revenge event and was held exclusively for wrestlers from the promotion's developmental brand, NXT. The two-part event took place on April 14 and April 21, 2026, at the WWE Performance Center in Orlando, Florida and aired as special episodes of NXT.

== Production ==
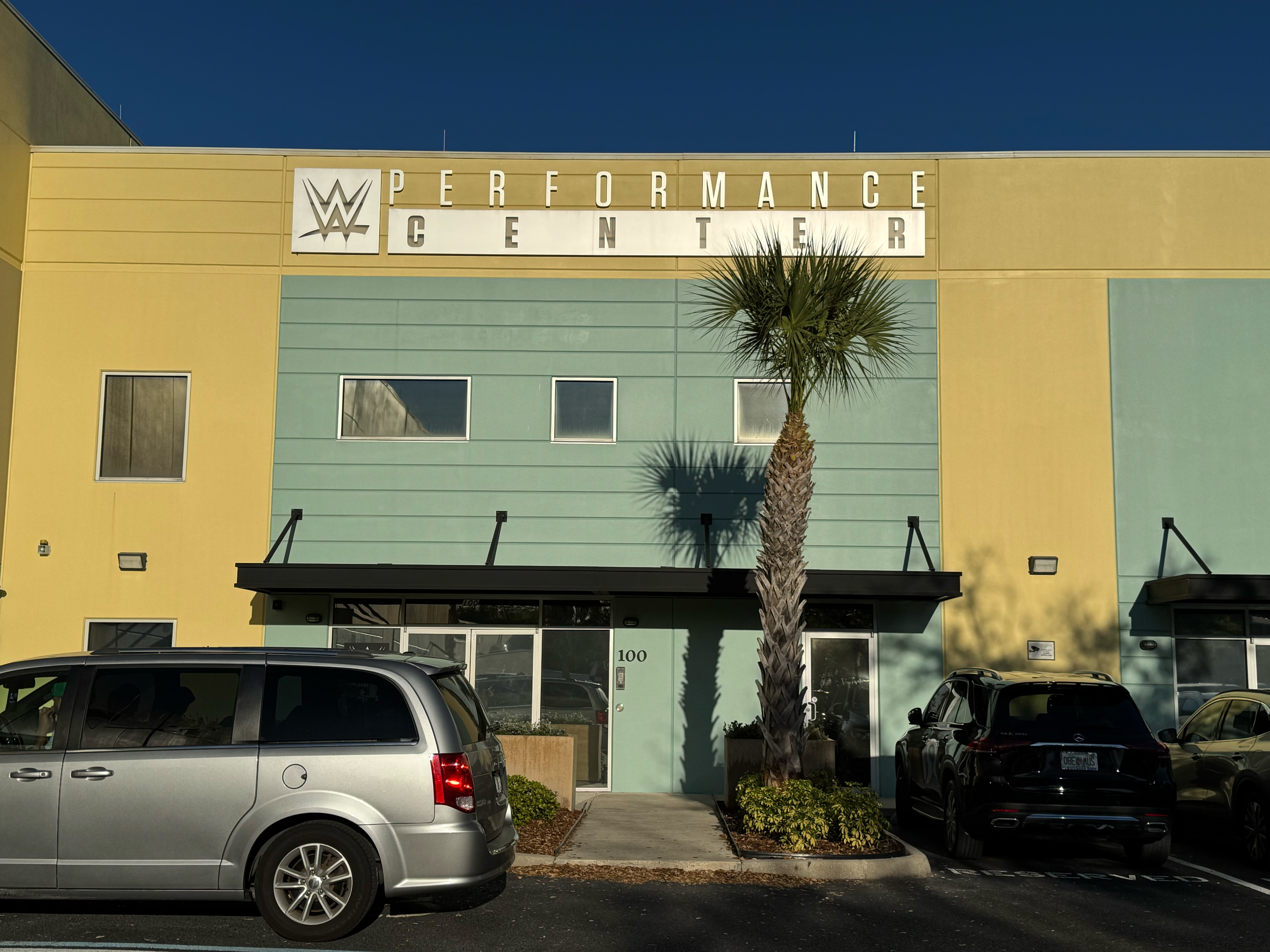
Revenge was held at the WWE Performance Center in Orlando, Florida.

=== Background ===
On the April 7 edition of NXT, general manager Robert Stone announced that for the next two weeks, the April 14 and April 21 editions of NXT would form part of a television special named Revenge.

=== Broadcast outlets ===
In the United States, it was available to watch through The CW, which has held the broadcasting rights to air NXT on a weekly basis since October 2024. In international markets, it was made available through over-the-top streaming service Netflix.

=== Storylines ===
The event included matches that resulted from scripted storylines. Results were predetermined by WWE's writers on the NXT brand, while storylines were produced on WWE's weekly television program NXT.

== Event ==
Other on-screen personnel
Role:	Name:
English commentators	Vic Joseph
English commentators	Booker T
Ring announcer	Mike Rome
Referees	Adrian Butler
Referees	Chip Danning
Referees	Dallas Irvin
Referees	Derek Sanders
Referees	Felix Fernandez
Referees	Gary Wilson
Referees	Jeremy Marcus
Referees	Joey Gonzalez
Referees	Victoria D'Errico
Interviewer	Blake Howard

=== Preliminary matches ===
==== Week 1 ====
On Week 1 of Revenge, held on April 14, 2026, the first match saw Kelani Jordan defeat Jaida Parker. Afterwards, Joe Hendry performed a song but was interrupted by Keanu Carver, who attacked him and various (kayfabe) security guards, sending them through the ringside barricades. Former Evolve superstar Kali Armstrong made her NXT debut at the event, where she faced Skylar Raye in a winning effort. Following this, Tony D'Angelo successfully defended his NXT Championship against Ethan Page. During a promo, NXT North American Champion was interrupted by DarkState. In the subsequent match, EK Prosper defeated Dorian Van Dux in the qualifying match to advance for the vacant WWE Speed Championship.

==== Week 2 ====
In the first match contested of Week 2, held on April 21, Myles Borne defended his NXT North American Championship against Dion Lennox of DarkState. In the following match, Joe Hendry faced Keanu Carver. Carver won after delivering repeated blows to the head, causing the match to be called off due to a technical knockout (TKO). After this, Lexis King defeated EK Prosper to win the vacant WWE Speed Championship, becoming the seventh Speed Championship overall. Later on, Tatum Paxley defeated Blake Monroe in a casket match to retain the NXT Women's North American Championship. Lola Vice cut a promo which was interrupted by Izzi Dame, who hit her with a superkick.

=== Main event ===
In the main event of Week 1, NXT Women's Champion Lola Vice successfully retained her championship against Jacy Jayne, who was accompanied ringside by her Fatal Influence stablemates Fallon Henley and Lainey Reid. In the main event of Week 2, Zaria defeated Sol Ruca in a last woman standing match, in which she was victorious after Ruca was pushed off the platform in the WWE Performance Center and remained down for the 10 count.

== Results ==
=== Week 1 ===
No.	Results	Stipulations	Times
1	Kelani Jordan defeated Jaida Parker by pinfall	Singles match	12:26
2	Kali Armstrong defeated Skylar Raye by pinfall	Singles match	4:00
3	Tony D'Angelo (c) defeated Ethan Page by pinfall	Singles match for the WWE NXT Championship	12:39
4	EK Prosper defeated Dorian Van Dux by pinfall	Qualifying match to advance in the WWE Speed Championship tournament	2:52
5	Lola Vice (c) defeated Jacy Jayne (with Fallon Henley & Lainey Reid) by pinfall	Singles match for the WWE NXT Women's Championship	10:34
(c) / – the champion(s) heading into the match

=== Week 2 ===
No.	Results	Stipulations	Times
1	Myles Borne (c) defeated Dion Lennox (with Cutler James, Osiris Griffin & Saquon Shugars) by pinfall	Singles match for the NXT North American Championship	11:20
2	Keanu Carver defeated Joe Hendry by referee stoppage	Singles match	9:11
3	Lexis King (with Arianna Grace, Channing "Stacks" Lorenzo, Charlie Dempsey & Uriah Connors) defeated EK Prosper by pinfall	Singles match for the vacant WWE Speed Championship	4:33
4	Tatum Paxley (c) defeated Blake Monroe	Casket match for the NXT Women's North American Championship	11:43
5	Zaria defeated Sol Ruca	Last Woman Standing match	15:56
(c) / – the champion(s) heading into the match
