= Lexis King =

American professional wrestler (born 1993)

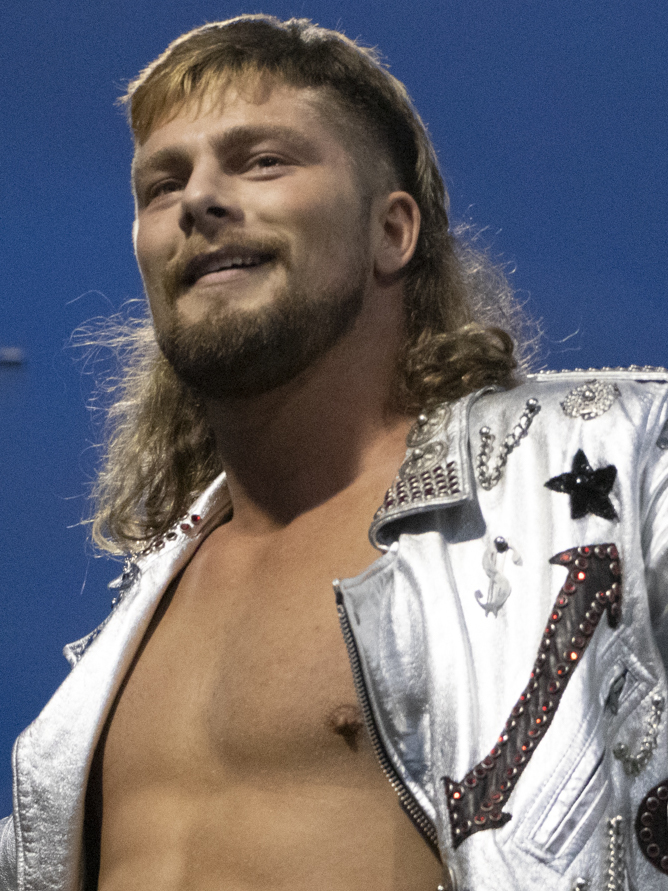
- King in 2020

Personal information
- Born: Brian Zachary Pillman; September 9, 1993 (age 33) Erlanger, Kentucky, U.S.
- Education: Northern Kentucky University
- Parent: Brian Pillman (father)

Professional wrestling career
- Ring name(s): Alex King; Brian Pillman II; Brian Pillman Jr. Lexis King
- Billed height: 6 ft 1 in (185 cm)
- Billed weight: 225 lb (102 kg)
- Billed from: Cincinnati, Ohio
- Trained by: Lance Storm; Rip Rogers; AJ Styles
- Debut: December 18, 2017

Brian Zachary Pillman (born September 9, 1993) is an American professional wrestler. As of August 2023, he is signed to WWE, where he performs on the NXT brand under the ring name Lexis King and is the leader of the BirthRight stable. He is a former one-time NXT Heritage Cup Champion and a former one-time and the final WWE Speed Champion.

Pillman is also known for his time in All Elite Wrestling (AEW) from 2019 to 2023 and Major League Wrestling (MLW) from 2018 to 2021, where he worked under his real name. A second-generation wrestler, he is the son of Brian Pillman.

== Early life and education ==
Brian Zachary Pillman is the son of professional wrestler Brian William Pillman (1962–1997) and model Melanie Diane Pillman (née Lawrence; 1965–2022), now both deceased. He had five siblings: sisters Danielle, Brittany, Alexis Reed, and Skylar King, as well as one brother, Jesse Morgan. His sister Alexis Reed became a professional wrestling valet under the ring name Lexi Pillman, but died in 2009 in a car accident.

Pillman attended Dixie Heights High School in Edgewood, Kentucky, where he played football. He graduated in 2011 and furthered his education by attending college. Pillman earned a degree at Northern Kentucky University in Information Systems.

== Professional wrestling career ==
=== Independent circuit (2017–2021) ===
In February 2017, Pillman announced he would be following his father's footsteps and become a professional wrestler. He was trained by Lance Storm at his school, the Storm Wrestling Academy, in Calgary, Alberta, Canada.

Pillman's first match was on December 18, 2017, using the ring name Alex King, a tribute to his sisters Alexis Reed and Skylar King. Pillman made his professional debut for Combat Zone Wrestling (CZW) on January 28, 2018, at Dojo Wars 162 against Mike Del for the CZW Medal of Valor Championship. Pillman was defeated in the match by submission. Pillman would have one more match in CZW, in a tag team match, teaming with Teddy Hart and facing Anthony Bennet and Jimmy Lloyd at Super Show V on January 26.

On January 18, 2020, Pillman was a surprise 16th entrant in a 16-man Battle Royal at International Wrestling Cartel's (IWC) Reloaded 6.0 event. He did not win the match, but he appeared in the main event, helping IWC Heavyweight Champion Jack Pollock win the match. After the match, Pillman revealed he had signed a contract with IWC, and that part of his contract was a shot at the IWC Championship at the promotion's February event. On February 15, Pillman defeated Sam Adonis, Aramis, Lance Archer, Black Taurus, Michael Elgin, Andrew Everett, and Alex Zayne in a War of Attrition match to win the vacant Warrior Wrestling Championship. The title was left vacant due to injury of former champion Brian Cage. On September 12, 2020, in Washington, Pennsylvania, he won the IWC Super Indy Championship.

=== Major League Wrestling (2018–2021) ===
In late 2018, Pillman signed a contract with Major League Wrestling (MLW). When he first came in, he was mentored by his father's World Championship Wrestling rival Kevin Sullivan. He then turned on Sullivan and joined forces with Teddy Hart and Davey Boy Smith Jr., creating the New Era Hart Foundation. This took place in a backstage segment where Pillman attacked Sullivan with a cane, causing Sullivan to bleed. On July 9, 2021, it was reported that Pillman was no longer working with MLW as his contract had expired.

=== All Elite Wrestling (2019–2023) ===
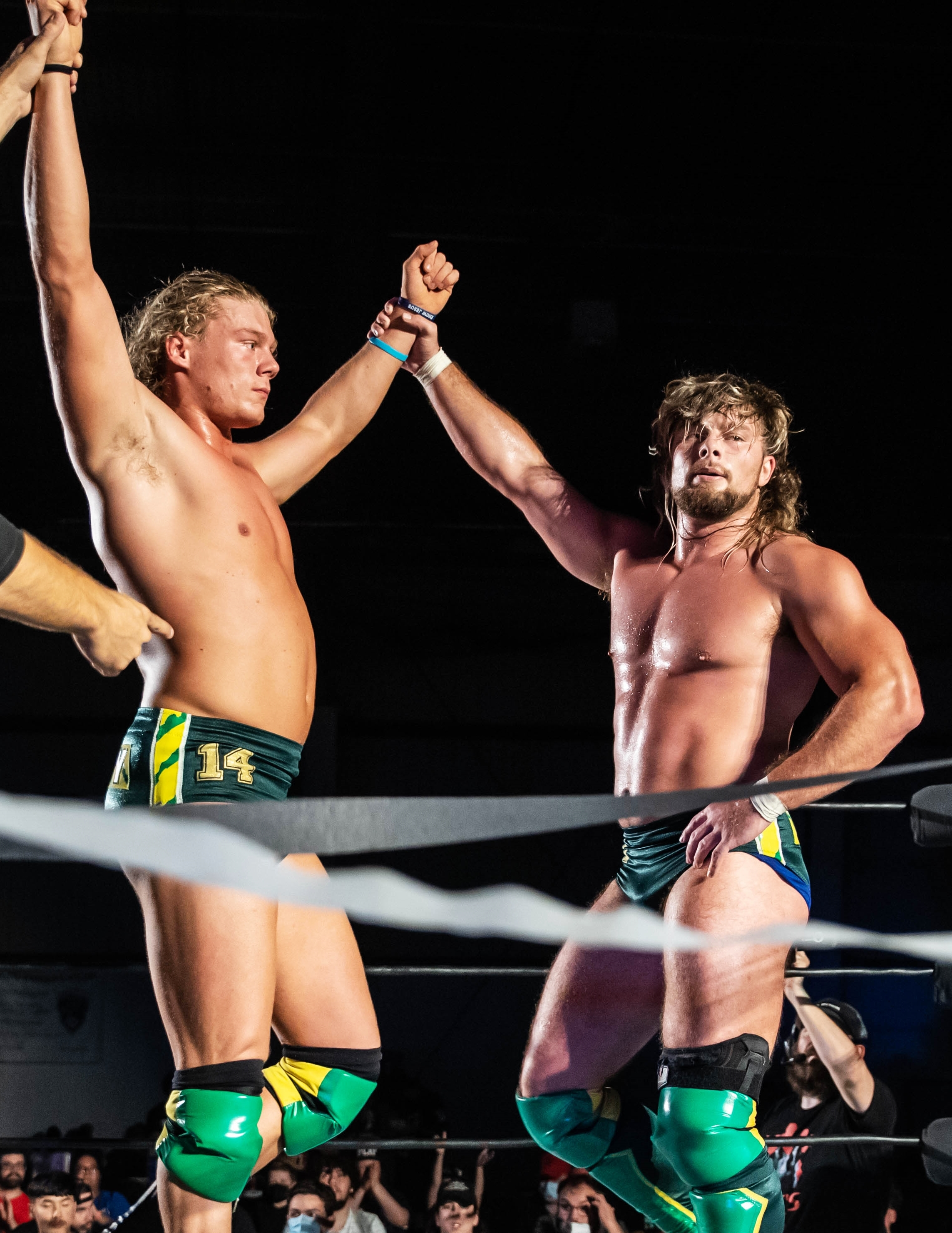
Brian Pillman Jr. (right) and Griff Garrison (left) and as the Varsity Blondes in September 2022.

In May 2019, Pillman was a participant in the Casino Battle Royale at All Elite Wrestling's (AEW) inaugural pay-per-view event, Double or Nothing. In July 2020, with MLW shut down due to the COVID-19 pandemic, Pillman began to appear in AEW, wrestling on both their flagship show Dynamite, and their online show Dark. Pillman remained contracted to MLW, but was allowed to work for AEW as well. He made his in ring return on the July 7 episode of Dark in a losing effort against Shawn Spears. After this, Pillman was used as mostly as an enhancement talent, losing to the likes of Brian Cage and Eddie Kingston.

In late July, Pillman began teaming with fellow AEW newcomer Griff Garrison, still competing mostly on Dark, adopting the team name The Varsity Blonds, a tribute to Pillman's father. On May 11, 2021 Julia Hart started aligning herself with The Varsity Blonds and made appearances with them for several months. On July 12, 2021, Pillman signed a full-time deal with AEW, making him an official member of the roster. His contract expired on July 11, 2023, ending his time with AEW.

=== WWE (2023–present) ===
==== Debut and championship pursuits (2023–2025) ====
On July 16, 2023, it was reported by PWInsider that Pillman had a tryout with WWE at the WWE Performance Center. He was officially assigned to the developmental brand NXT in late August and videos promoting his debut began airing in September, changing his name to Lexis King, a second iteration of his "Alex King" name. His ties to his father were acknowledged, but he denounced him and his name in his vignettes due to his early death, establishing himself as a heel. He competed in his first match on October 24 on Night 1 of NXT: Halloween Havoc, defeating Dante Chen. King competed in his first WWE premium live event on December 9 at NXT Deadline, where he lost to Carmelo Hayes, thus marking his first loss in WWE. King participated in the 2023 NXT Men's Breakout Tournament after attacking original competitor Trey Bearhill and subsequently taking his place. He defeated Dion Lennox in the first round, but lost to Riley Osborne in the semifinals after interference from Bearhill. He also wrestled for the NXT North American Championship twice, first against Dragon Lee and later against Oba Femi, losing both times. Continuing his feud with Dante Chen, they wrestled in a Singapore Cane match, where King won. On the October 15 episode of NXT, King faced Oro Mensah in a Gentleman's Duel match, where he would emerge victorious. After the match, both King and Mensah shook hands, with the former subsequently raising Mensah's hand as a sign of respect, turning face in the process.

On the October 29 episode of NXT, King faced Charlie Dempsey for the NXT Heritage Cup in British Round Rules, but was defeated. On the December 24 episode of NXT (taped December 17), King defeated Dempsey for the Cup, his first championship win in WWE. However, due to a grey area in British Round Rules regarding the disqualification of the reigning champion, NXT general manager Ava ordered a sudden death one-fall match at NXT: New Year's Evil on January 7, 2025, where King defeated Dempsey to solidify his win of the Cup. WWE recognizes this as an uninterrupted singular reign. During his title reign, he would revert to being a heel by using dirty tactics to retain the Cup, including in a rematch with Dempsey. He also announced that his NXT Heritage Cup matches will be defended in one-fall matches instead of British Round Rules. On the February 25 episode of NXT, King failed to defeat TNA X Division Champion Moose for the title. On the April 22 episode of NXT, King lost the Cup to the returning Noam Dar, ending his reign at 118 days. On the December 30 episode of NXT, King set the record for the fastest loss on NXT when he lost to Tavion Heights in eight seconds in the finals of the Speed Championship #1 Contender's tournament.

==== BirthRight (2026–present) ====
In early 2026, King formed a new faction called BirthRight, consisting of second generation WWE wrestlers with Channing "Stacks" Lorenzo and Arianna Grace (the fiancé of Grace and the daughter of Santino Marella, respectively), Uriah Conners (son of Fit Finlay), and Charlie Dempsey (son of William Regal). At the NXT Stand & Deliver countdown show on April 4, BirthRight teamed together for the first time where they lost to Hank and Tank, Shiloh Hill, EK Prosper, and Wren Sinclair in a 10-person mixed tag team match. Around the same time, King entered the tournament for the vacant Speed Championship after previous champion Elio LeFleur relinquished the title due to a shoulder injury. On April 21 at Week 2 of NXT: Revenge, King defeated Prosper in the tournament final to win the vacant title. His title reign ended on the September 1 episode of NXT when NXT General Manager Robert Stone retired the title following the retirement of the WWE Women's Speed Championship.

== Personal life ==
Pillman had a strained relationship with his mother Melanie due to her battles with drug addiction following his father's death when Pillman was four years old. Pillman, who was primarily raised by his aunt Linda Pillman (his dad's sister) growing up, shared in a shoot interview that he felt his mother was feigning her grieving during her infamous interview with Vince McMahon on WWE Raw is War one day after his dad's death, as their marriage was already going through the divorce process at the time and she simply wanted a pay day for drugs. Unlike most wrestling fans and the media, Pillman did not fault WWE for the somewhat tactless interview with his mother, as he credited the promotion for trying to help out him and his sisters as much as possible financially.

Pillman's relationship with his mother started improving after his wrestling career started; this included her making regular appearances during Pillman's live Twitch streams and sharing stories about his father. Melanie was found dead from an apparent drug overdose on June 1, 2022, at the age of 56, as confirmed by Pillman. At the time of his mother's death, Pillman stated that her death was "unexpected, but was not surprising," noting that she had bad "lifestyle choices that dominated the better part of the last 25 years of her life" and which "had ultimately caught up with her."

During his early tenure in NXT, fans of Pillman began referring to themselves as "Registered Lex Offenders" (a reference to registered sex offenders). While Pillman appreciated the creativity, he said that it is not appropriate for television.

Pillman's brother, Jesse Morgan, died on October 2, 2025.

Pillman became engaged to his partner Carolina Cruz on September 6, 2026.

== Championships and accomplishments ==
- Cauliflower Alley Club
  - Rising Star Award (2020)
- International Wrestling Cartel
  - IWC Super Indy Championship (1 time)
- Kross Fire Wrestling
  - KFW Championship (1 time)
- Major League Wrestling
  - MLW World Tag Team Championship (1 time) – with Davey Boy Smith Jr. and Teddy Hart
  - Rookie of the Year (2018)
- Ohio Valley Wrestling
  - OVW Heavyweight Championship (1 time)
- Pro Wrestling Illustrated
  - Rookie of the Year (2019)
  - Ranked No. 135 of the top 500 singles wrestlers in the PWI 500 in 2021
- Supreme Wrestling
  - Supreme Mid America Heavyweight Championship (1 time)
- Warrior Wrestling
  - Warrior Wrestling Championship (1 time)
- WWE
  - WWE Speed Championship (1 time, final)
  - NXT Heritage Cup (1 time)
  - WWE Speed Championship Tournament (2026)
