= List of former championships in WWE =

In professional wrestling, championships are competed for in scripted storylines by a promotion's roster of contracted wrestlers. WWE is an American-based company and is the world's largest professional wrestling promotion. The company's origins begin in 1953 as the Capitol Wrestling Corporation (CWC), a Northeastern territory of the National Wrestling Alliance (NWA). In 1963, CWC left the NWA to become the World Wide Wrestling Federation (WWWF), which was renamed to World Wrestling Federation (WWF) in 1979 and then World Wrestling Entertainment (WWE) in 2002 — since 2011, the company has promoted itself solely under the trade name of WWE. In the company's 60-year history, over 40 different unique championships have been operated and contended for. These titles consisted of divisional, special stipulations, and weight-class championships. Of these titles, over 28 have been retired and succeeded through replacement titles or title unifications. The first championship retirement occurred in June 1961 with the Northeast version of the NWA World Tag Team Championship (created in February 1957). The most recent retirement to have occurred was in September 2026 with the WWE Speed Championship (which was created in March 2024). The following is a compilation of the company's former championships that were once active and contended for by its roster.

== History ==
=== 1953–1969 ===
In 1953, Capitol Wrestling Corporation (CWC) became a member of the National Wrestling Alliance (NWA). During this time, CWC wrestlers could compete for championships operated by the NWA. In 1957, the CWC created the NWA United States Television Championship, its first overall men's singles championship, with Johnny Valentine being the inaugural holder of the championship. The following year, the CWC created the NWA United States Tag Team Championship, which inaugural champions Mark Lewin and Don Curtis won in April of that year. In 1963, CWC ended its partnership with the NWA and established itself as the World Wide Wrestling Federation (WWWF). To reflect the changes, the WWWF introduced its world heavyweight championship (WWE's third overall male singles championship and the current WWE Championship), while the WWWF acronym was added to the United States Tag Team title. Without a formal explanation by the WWWF, although newly crowned co-holder Bruno Sammartino was also the company's World Heavyweight champion at the time, the Tag Team title was disbanded in 1967, the first championship to be retired during the WWWF years. Ten years later, the company retired its first individually contested WWWF-branded title, the WWWF United States Heavyweight Championship, also without a formal explanation.

=== 1970–1999 ===
The WWWF/WWF formed partnerships with New Japan Pro-Wrestling (NJPW), Universal Wrestling Federation (UWF), and Universal Wrestling Association (UWA) between the 1970s and 1980s, and as a result, created and lent titles to these promotions. In 1979, the promotion renamed itself to the World Wrestling Federation (WWF) and six years later ended its partnerships with NJPW and UWF. This resulted in the retirement of one UWF and three NJPW lent titles: the WWF International Heavyweight Championship (UWF), WWF Junior Heavyweight Championship, WWF World Martial Arts Heavyweight Championship,^{[a]} and WWF International Tag Team Championship (NJPW). The company also ceased operations of three short-lived titles: the WWF North American Heavyweight Championship (1979–1981), WWF Canadian Championship (1985–1986), and WWF Women's Tag Team Championship (1983–1989). Despite their names, the geographic-name-based titles were not restricted to wrestlers from that location. During the 1990s, the WWF ended its relationship with the UWA; as a result, the WWF Intercontinental Tag Team Championship was abandoned, while the WWF Light Heavyweight Championship (which UWA possessed) was reactivated in the United States for use by the WWF. In 1996, the Million Dollar Championship, a title created by Ted DiBiase, was retired, although it was never sanctioned by the WWF, but was reintroduced briefly in 2010 by Ted DiBiase Jr., and again in 2021 as part of a storyline in NXT.

=== 2000–2015 ===
In March 2001, the WWF acquired all assets of World Championship Wrestling (WCW), including its championships. Of these titles, the WWF operated the WCW World Heavyweight, World Tag Team, and Cruiserweight championships. In late 2001, the WWF discontinued the WCW World Heavyweight and Tag Team Championships (which were unified with WWF's world and tag team championships, respectively), while the WWF Light Heavyweight Championship was retired in favor of the Cruiserweight, which would also be retired in 2007. In 2002, WWF was renamed to World Wrestling Entertainment (WWE), and during this year, WWE discontinued the WWE Hardcore and European Championships after they were unified with the WWE Intercontinental Championship.

WWE also acquired all assets of Extreme Championship Wrestling (ECW) in 2003, and implemented the ECW brand in 2006, along with the reactivated ECW World Heavyweight Championship; however, when the brand closed in 2010, the title was retired after Ezekiel Jackson became the last champion on the final episode of the ECW on Syfy series. The World Tag Team Championship, established in 1971, and WWE Tag Team Championship, introduced in 2002, were unified on April 9, 2009, maintaining separate title histories as the "Unified WWE Tag Team Championship". However, on August 16, 2010, the older title was retired in favor of keeping the newer title as the sole tag team championship contended for in WWE. The champions, The Hart Dynasty (David Hart Smith and Tyson Kidd) were awarded a new set of belts that represented the 2002 championship, and were thus recognized as the final holders of the original World Tag Team Championship.

The original WWE Women's Championship, established in 1956, and the WWE Divas Championship, introduced in 2008, were unified on September 19, 2010, maintaining the title history of the Divas Championship. The older title was retired in favor of keeping the newer title as the sole championship contended for in WWE by the Divas. The self-professed co-Women's Champion Michelle McCool defeated Divas Champion Melina at Night of Champions to become the unified champion, thus making Layla the final holder of the Women's Championship. On April 3, 2016, at WrestleMania 32, Divas Champion Charlotte was originally scheduled to defend her title in a triple-threat match. At the event, however, the Divas Championship was replaced with a new WWE Women's Championship, with the winner of the triple-threat match becoming the inaugural champion, thus Charlotte was the final holder of the Divas Championship.

The World Heavyweight Championship was established in 2002 as a second world championship in WWE during the time of the first brand extension. During this period, the World Heavyweight Championship would be the primary championship for either the Raw or SmackDown brand, with the WWE Championship on the other. The brand extension ended in 2011, allowing both championships to appear on both shows. On December 15, 2013, World Heavyweight Champion John Cena faced WWE Champion Randy Orton in a Tables, Ladders. and Chairs match at TLC: Tables, Ladders & Chairs, where the World Heavyweight Championship was unified with the WWE Championship as Orton defeated Cena. At the event, it was announced that the unified titles would be called the "WWE World Heavyweight Championship", retaining the lineage of the WWE Championship. WWE officially recognized Orton as the final World Heavyweight Champion and retired the title.

=== 2016–2023 ===
In 2016, WWE reintroduced the brand extension. Shortly after, the cruiserweight division was revived and a new WWE Cruiserweight Championship was established. This newer title did not carry the lineage of the original Cruiserweight Championship that was retired in 2007. The title was originally exclusive to the Raw brand before it became exclusive to the 205 Live brand in 2018. It then also became part of NXT after 205 Live merged under NXT in October 2019. It was subsequently renamed the NXT Cruiserweight Championship and was then extended to the NXT UK brand in January 2020. However, in January 2022, the championship was retired. At the New Year's Evil special episode of NXT 2.0 on January 4, 2022, the title was unified into the NXT North American Championship. North American Champion Carmelo Hayes defeated Cruiserweight Champion Roderick Strong, with Hayes recognized as the final Cruiserweight Champion and going forward as North American Champion.

In December 2016, WWE announced that they would be establishing a new United Kingdom-based brand and the first championship created for the brand was the WWE United Kingdom Championship. In June 2018, the brand was formally established as NXT UK, and the NXT UK Women's Championship and NXT UK Tag Team Championship were created at that time. In early 2020, the WWE United Kingdom Championship was renamed as the NXT United Kingdom Championship, and later that year, the NXT UK Heritage Cup was established. In August 2022, WWE announced that the NXT UK brand would be going on hiatus following the Worlds Collide event on September 4, 2022, and the brand would relaunch as NXT Europe at a later time. As such, all of NXT UK's championships were unified into their respective NXT championship counterparts, except for the NXT UK Heritage Cup, which was later transferred to NXT in 2023. The NXT United Kingdom Championship, NXT UK Women's Championship, and NXT UK Tag Team Championship were unified into the NXT Championship, NXT Women's Championship, and NXT Tag Team Championship, respectively, with Tyler Bate, Meiko Satomura, and the team of Brooks Jensen and Josh Briggs recognized as the final champions of each.

In May 2019, WWE introduced the WWE 24/7 Championship, a title similar to the company's former Hardcore Championship. The title had a "24/7" rule in which it could be defended anytime, anywhere, as long as a WWE referee was present. Due to this rule, it was available to all of WWE's brands and could be won by both men and women as well as non-WWE employees. After Nikki Cross won the championship on the November 7, 2022, episode of Raw, she discarded the title as trash backstage and two days later, the championship was listed as inactive on WWE.com.

In March 2021, WWE introduced the NXT Women's Tag Team Championship for the NXT brand following a controversy over the WWE Women's Tag Team Championship. Prior to this, the WWE Women's Tag Team Championship was available to Raw, SmackDown, and NXT, but ceased appearing on NXT after the brand established its own tag team championship. After two years, on the June 23, 2023, episode of SmackDown, the NXT Women's Tag Team Championship was unified into the WWE Women's Tag Team Championship, retiring the former with the latter becoming available to NXT again.

=== 2024–present ===
On July 25, 2016, WWE introduced the WWE Universal Championship for the Raw brand as the counterpart to SmackDown's WWE Championship, and on August 21, 2016, at SummerSlam, Finn Bálor was crowned the inaugural champion. From April 2022 to April 2024, both the WWE and Universal titles were held together as the Undisputed WWE Universal Championship, with both titles maintaining their individual lineages, after which, it was truncated to Undisputed WWE Championship. On April 21, 2025, it was revealed that the Universal Championship was retired, with the title history amended to show that it was retired on April 7, 2024, listing Roman Reigns as the last champion with the title's retirement coming with his loss on Night 2 of WrestleMania XL, therefore leaving Cody Rhodes's reign as unrecognized as the title history from April 7, 2024, until it was updated on April 21, 2025, had listed Rhodes as champion.

The NXT Heritage Cup was established in September 2020, originally for NXT UK. Following a production hiatus since March 2020 due to the COVID-19 pandemic, NXT UK relaunched that September, and along with the relaunch, WWE announced a tournament to crown the inaugural NXT UK Heritage Cup Champion. The Heritage Cup was defended just like any other championship, but all matches were contested under British Rounds Rules, but unlike WWE's other championships, the Heritage Cup was represented by a trophy instead of a championship belt. After NXT UK went on hiatus in September 2022, the Heritage Cup was transferred to NXT in February 2023, also renaming it as the NXT Heritage Cup. During reigning champion Channing "Stacks" Lorenzo's feud with Tony D'Angelo in mid-2025, the latter stole the NXT Heritage Cup and tossed it off a bridge during The Great American Bash on July 12, 2025. Following this incident, Lorenzo did not appear with the Cup nor was he referred to as champion on-screen, but the title remained listed as active with Lorenzo as the reigning champion in the official title history on WWE's website. Nearly a year later on June 3, 2026, WWE's website was updated to list the Cup as retired, with the end date of Lorenzo's reign and the official retirement date listed as July 12, 2025.

In April 2024, WWE launched an online program called Speed that streamed exclusively on the social media platform X. The program featured matches between wrestlers from Raw, SmackDown, and NXT and the matches had a three-minute time limit for regular episodes. Speed originally only featured matches with male wrestlers, with special episodes for the WWE Speed Championship having a five-minute time limit. The inaugural men's Speed Champion was crowned at the end of April, but aired a week later in May. The WWE Women's Speed Championship was introduced later that year, with its inaugural champion crowned in October. After the quiet cancellation of Speed in July 2025, both titles were moved to NXT but still open to challengers from all of WWE's brands, including Evolve and WWE ID, as well as partner promotion Total Nonstop Action Wrestling (TNA) and Mexican subsidiary Lucha Libre AAA Worldwide (AAA). After two years, both titles were retired. The Women's Speed Championship was retired first as it was unified with the NXT Women's North American Championship at Heatwave on August 30, 2026. The men's Speed Championship was subsequently retired on the following episode of NXT on September 1. According to a report, both Speed titles were not retired sooner as WWE had hoped that another deal with X could have been made to relaunch the Speed program.

== Defunct championships ==
=== Men ===
==== Singles championships ====
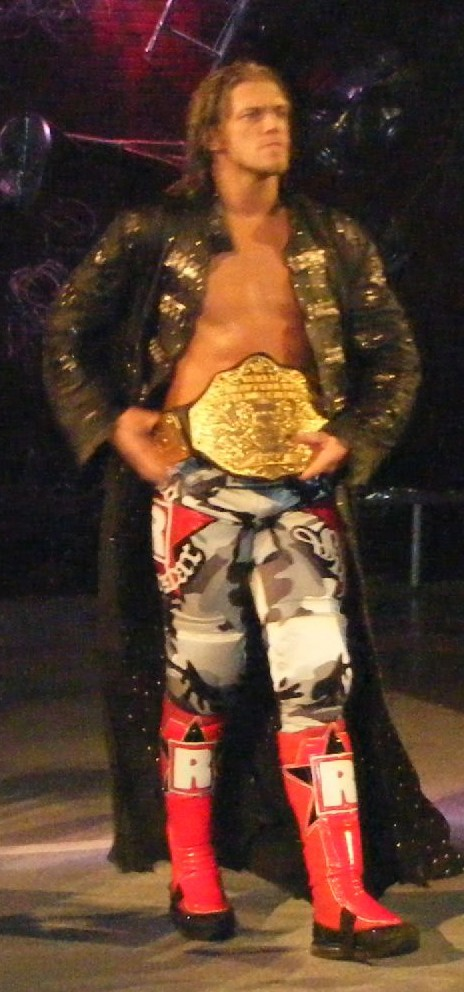
The original World Heavyweight Championship (shown being worn by record seven-time champion Edge) served as a second world championship in WWE from 2002 to 2013

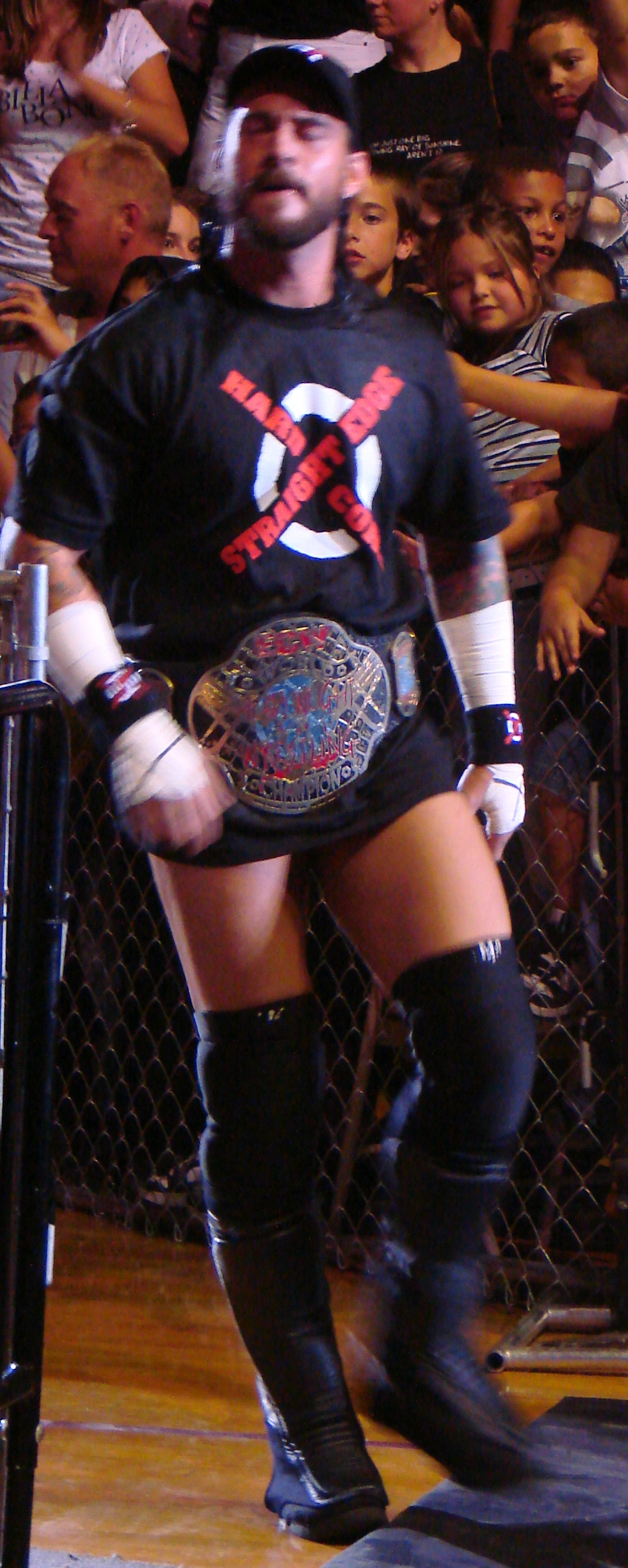
The ECW Championship (shown being held by one-time champion CM Punk) served as a third world championship in WWE from 2006 to 2010, primarily on the ECW brand

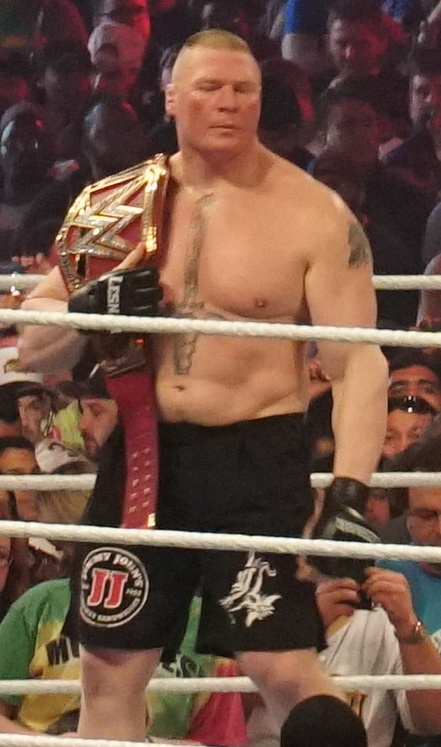
The WWE Universal Championship (shown being held by record three-time champion Brock Lesnar) was a world championship active from 2016 to 2024.

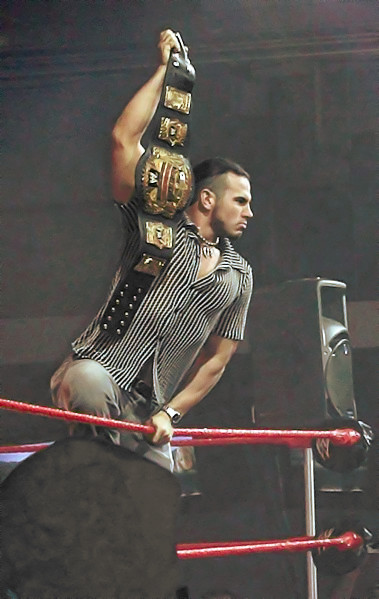
The original WWE Cruiserweight Championship (shown being held by one-time champion Matt Hardy) was officially recognized as established in 1991 by WCW, brought to WWE in 2001 following its purchase of WCW, and remained active until 2007

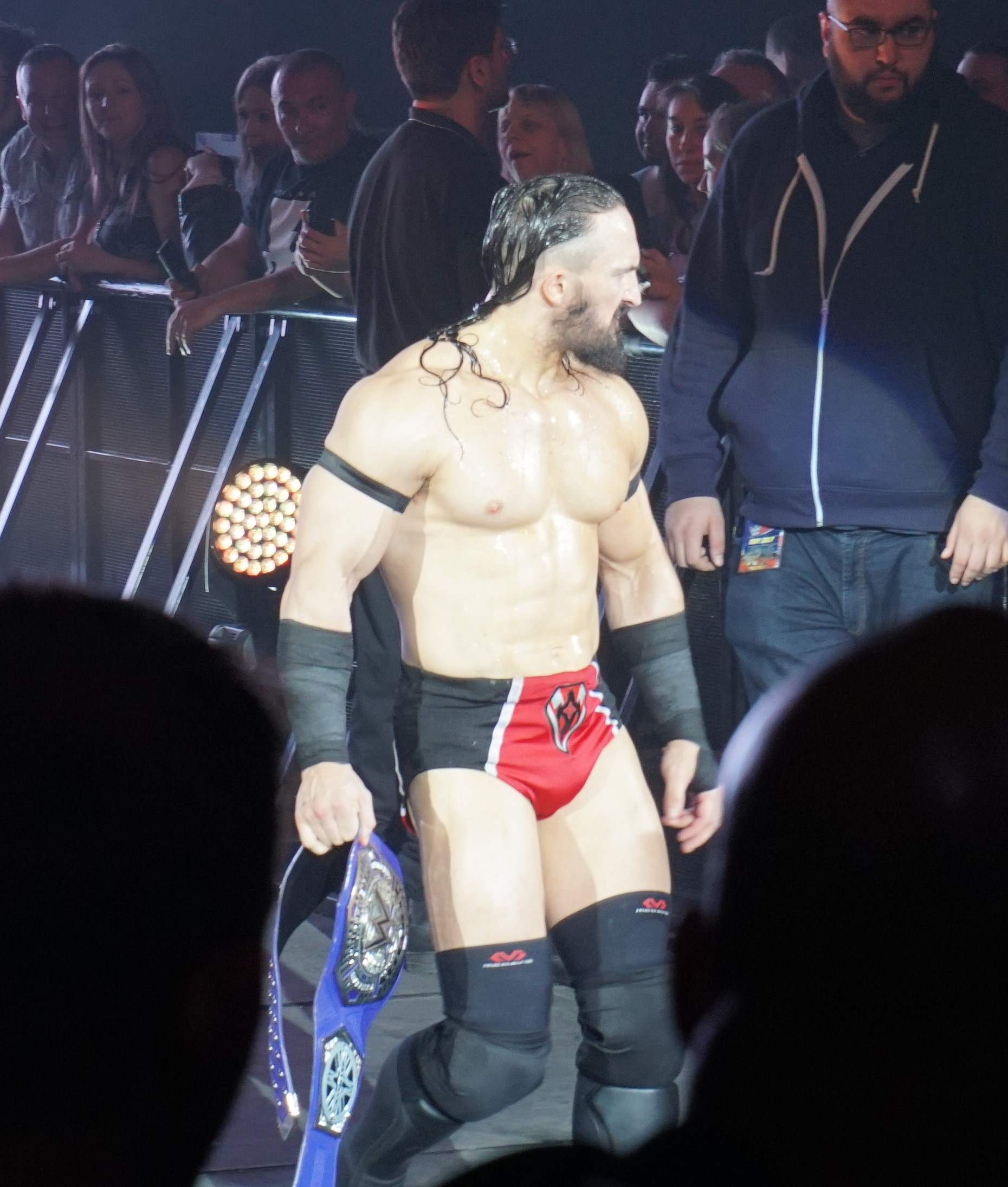
The NXT Cruiserweight Championship (shown being held by two-time champion Neville when it was called the WWE Cruiserweight Championship) was active from 2016 to 2022.

Championship	Date of entry	First champion	Date retired	Final champion	Years active	Notes
NWA United States Television Championship	1957 or 1958	Johnny Valentine	July 25, 1962	Johnny Valentine	5 or 6	The title was retired without a formal announcement.
WWF International Heavyweight Championship	July 1959	Antonino Rocca	October 31, 1985	Tatsumi Fujinami	26 (Note: The title was deactivated from 1963 to 1982.)	The title was retired after NJPW and WWF ended their partnership.
WWWF United States Heavyweight Championship	April 20, 1960	Buddy Rogers	March 1, 1976	Bobo Brazil	15	The title was retired without a formal announcement.
WWF Junior Heavyweight Championship	September 1965	Paul DeGalles	October 31, 1985	The Cobra	20 (Note: The title was deactivated from 1972 to 1978.)	The title was retired after NJPW and the WWF ended their partnership.
WWF World Martial Arts Heavyweight Championship	December 18, 1978	Antonio Inoki	December 31, 1989	Antonio Inoki	11	The title was retired after NJPW and the WWF ended their partnership.^{[a]}
WWF North American Heavyweight Championship	February 13, 1979	Ted DiBiase	March 20, 1981	Seiji Sakaguchi	2	The title was retired without a formal announcement.
WWF Canadian Championship	August 18, 1985	Dino Bravo	January 22, 1986	Dino Bravo	<1	Bravo was the only champion as a result of the WWF abandoning the title without a formal announcement.
Million Dollar Championship	February 15, 1989	Ted DiBiase	August 23, 2021	Cameron Grimes	32 (Note: The title was deactivated from February 1992 to December 1995, from May 1996 to April 2010, from November 2010 to February 2021, and since August 2021.)	In storyline, "The Million Dollar Man" Ted DiBiase created the title and it was never officially sanctioned by WWF/WWE. The title was retired without a formal announcement.
WWE European Championship	February 26, 1997	The British Bulldog	July 22, 2002	Jeff Hardy	5	The title was retired after it was unified into the WWE Intercontinental Championship.
WWF Light Heavyweight Championship	December 7, 1997^{[d]}	Taka Michinoku (Note: Michinoku was the first champion to win the championship as part of the WWF but was not the first champion in the title's history.)	March 8, 2002	X-Pac	4	The title was replaced by the WCW Cruiserweight Championship (renamed WWF Cruiserweight Championship) without a formal announcement.^{[a]}
WWE Cruiserweight Championship	March 23, 2001^{[b]}	Shane Helms^{[c]}	September 28, 2007	Hornswoggle	7	The title was retired without a formal announcement by WWE. This is not the same title as the WWE Cruiserweight Championship introduced at the Cruiserweight Classic in 2016, later renamed the NXT Cruiserweight Championship.
WCW Championship	March 23, 2001^{[b]}	Booker T^{[c]}	December 9, 2001	Chris Jericho	<1	The title was retired after it was unified into the WWF Championship.
World Heavyweight Championship (original version)	September 2, 2002	Triple H	December 16, 2013	Randy Orton	11	The title was retired after it was unified into the WWE Championship. This is not the same title as the World Heavyweight Championship introduced in 2023.
ECW Championship	June 13, 2006^{[e]}	Rob Van Dam (Note: Van Dam was the first champion to win the championship as part of WWE but was not the first champion in the title's history.)	February 16, 2010	Ezekiel Jackson	3	The title was retired on the final episode of ECW with the closure of the ECW brand.
NXT Cruiserweight Championship	September 14, 2016	T. J. Perkins	January 4, 2022	Carmelo Hayes	5	The title was retired after it was unified into the NXT North American Championship.
NXT United Kingdom Championship	December 15, 2016	Tyler Bate	September 4, 2022	Tyler Bate	5	The title was retired after it was unified into the NXT Championship.
WWE Universal Championship	August 21, 2016	Finn Bálor	April 7, 2024	Roman Reigns	8	The title was decommissioned in favor of continuing the WWE Championship lineage, as from April 2022 until April 2024, both titles were held together as the Undisputed WWE Universal Championship. Following Reigns's loss, the official title history had originally recognized Cody Rhodes as champion, with the title referred to as the Undisputed WWE Championship, up until Rhodes lost the title at WrestleMania 41 in April 2025. Upon his loss, the official title history was amended, removing Rhodes and instead recognizing Reigns as the final champion with the title retired the night he lost it at WrestleMania XL in April 2024.
NXT Heritage Cup	September 10, 2020	A-Kid	July 12, 2025	Channing "Stacks" Lorenzo	5	Tony D'Angelo stole the title and threw it off a bridge, shown during The Great American Bash on July 12, 2025. While the title initially remained listed as active on WWE.com, on June 3, 2026, it was updated as having been retired on this date.
WWE Speed Championship	March 27, 2024	Ricochet	September 1, 2026	Lexis King	2	After Zaria retired the WWE Women's Speed Championship two days prior, NXT General Manager Robert Stone had Lexis King relinquish the men's title and retired it.

==== Tag team championships ====
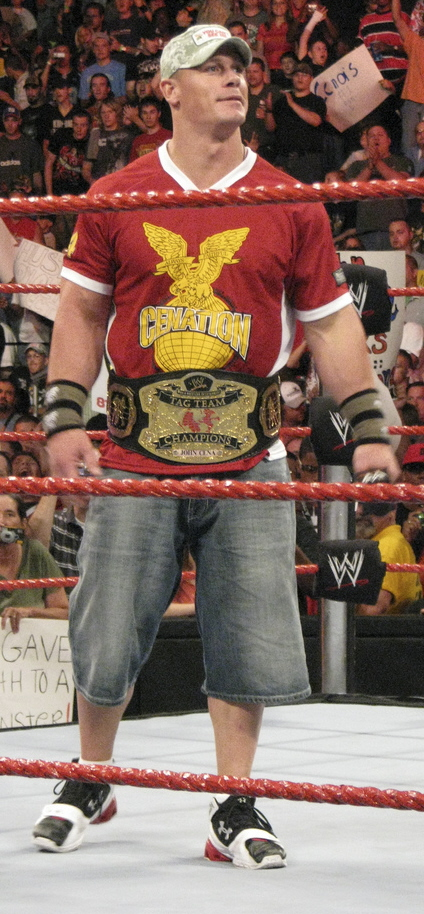
The original World Tag Team Championship (shown being worn by two-time champion John Cena) was active from 1971 to 2010.

Championship	Date of entry	First champions (Tag team name)	Date retired	Final champions (Tag team name)	Years active	Notes
NWA World Tag Team Championship (Northeast version)	February 26, 1957	Don Stevens and Jackie Fargo (Note: The team also defended the championship under the ring names "Wildman Stevens" and "Wildman Fargo".)	June 1961	Antonino Rocca and Miguel Pérez	4	The title was retired without a formal announcement.
WWWF United States Tag Team Championship	July 1958	Don Curtis and Mark Lewin	July 29, 1967	Spiros Arion and Bruno Sammartino	9	The title was retired without a formal announcement. (Sammartino was also WWWF World Heavyweight champion at the time).
WWF International Tag Team Championship	June 1, 1969	Toru Tanaka and Mitsu Arakawa (Rising Suns)	October 31, 1985	Tatsumi Fujinami and Kengo Kimura	16 (Note: The title was deactivated from 1972 to 1985.)	The title was retired after NJPW and the WWF ended their partnership.
World Tag Team Championship (original version)	June 3, 1971	Luke Graham and Tarzan Tyler	August 16, 2010^{[f]}	David Hart Smith and Tyson Kidd (The Hart Dynasty)	39	The title was retired in favor of the WWE Tag Team Championship (now called the World Tag Team Championship) in April 2010, following a year of the two titles being defended together under the umbrella title of "Unified WWE Tag Team Championship".
WWF Intercontinental Tag Team Championship	January 7, 1991	Perro Aguayo and Gran Hamada	July 1991	Perro Aguayo and Gran Hamada	<1	Aguayo and Hamada were the only champions as a result of the WWF retiring the title without a formal announcement.
WCW Tag Team Championship	March 23, 2001^{[b]}	Sean O' Haire and Chuck Palumbo^{[c]}	November 18, 2001	Bubba Ray and D-Von Dudley (The Dudley Boyz)	<1	The title was retired after it was unified into the WWF Tag Team Championship.
NXT UK Tag Team Championship	June 18, 2018	James Drake and Zack Gibson	September 4, 2022	Brooks Jensen and Josh Briggs	4	The title was retired after it was unified into the NXT Tag Team Championship.

=== Women ===
==== Singles championships ====
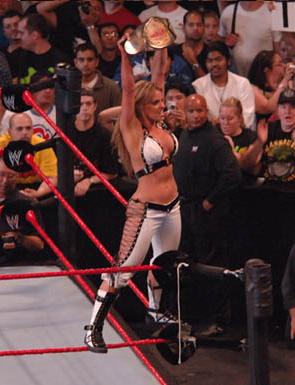
The original WWF/E Women's Championship (shown being held by record seven-time champion Trish Stratus) was active from 1956 to 2010, when it was unified with the WWE Divas Championship.

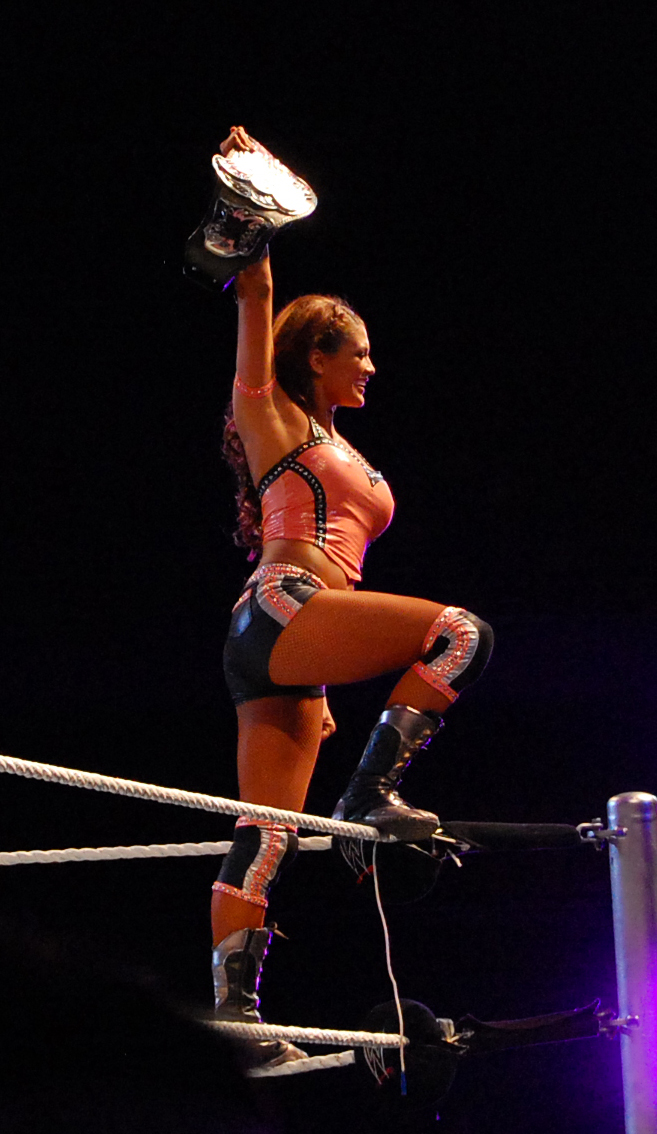
The WWE Divas Championship (shown being held by record three-time champion Eve Torres) was active from 2008 to 2016.

Championship	Date of entry	First champion	Date retired	Final champion	Years active	Notes
WWE Women's Championship (original version)	September 18, 1956	The Fabulous Moolah	September 19, 2010	Layla	54 (Note: The title was deactivated from 1990 to 1993 and again from 1995 to 1998.)	The title was retired after it was unified into the WWE Divas Championship. This is not the same title as the WWE Women's Championship introduced at WrestleMania 32 in April 2016, which was called the Raw Women's Championship from September 2016 to June 2023.
WWE Divas Championship	June 6, 2008	Michelle McCool	April 3, 2016	Charlotte	7	On the WrestleMania 32 pre-show, former WWE wrestler and WWE Hall of Famer Lita announced that the Divas Championship triple threat match with Charlotte, Becky Lynch, and Sasha Banks would instead be for the new WWE Women's Championship. The Divas Championship was subsequently retired.
NXT UK Women's Championship	June 18, 2018	Rhea Ripley	September 4, 2022	Meiko Satomura	4	The title was retired after it was unified into the NXT Women's Championship.
WWE Women's Speed Championship	August 9, 2024	Candice LeRae	August 30, 2026	Wren Sinclair	2	The title was retired after it was unified into the NXT Women's North American Championship.

==== Tag team championships ====
Championship	Date of entry	First champion(s) (Tag team name)	Date retired	Final champion(s) (Tag team name)	Years active	Notes
WWF Women's Tag Team Championship	May 13, 1983	Velvet McIntyre and Princess Victoria	February 14, 1989	Leilani Kai and Judy Martin (The Glamour Girls)	5	The title was abandoned by the WWF without a formal announcement. This is not the same title as the WWE Women's Tag Team Championship announced on the December 24, 2018, episode of Raw.
NXT Women's Tag Team Championship	March 10, 2021	Dakota Kai and Raquel González	June 23, 2023	Alba Fyre and Isla Dawn	2	The title was retired after it was unified into the WWE Women's Tag Team Championship.

=== Unisex ===
==== Singles championships ====
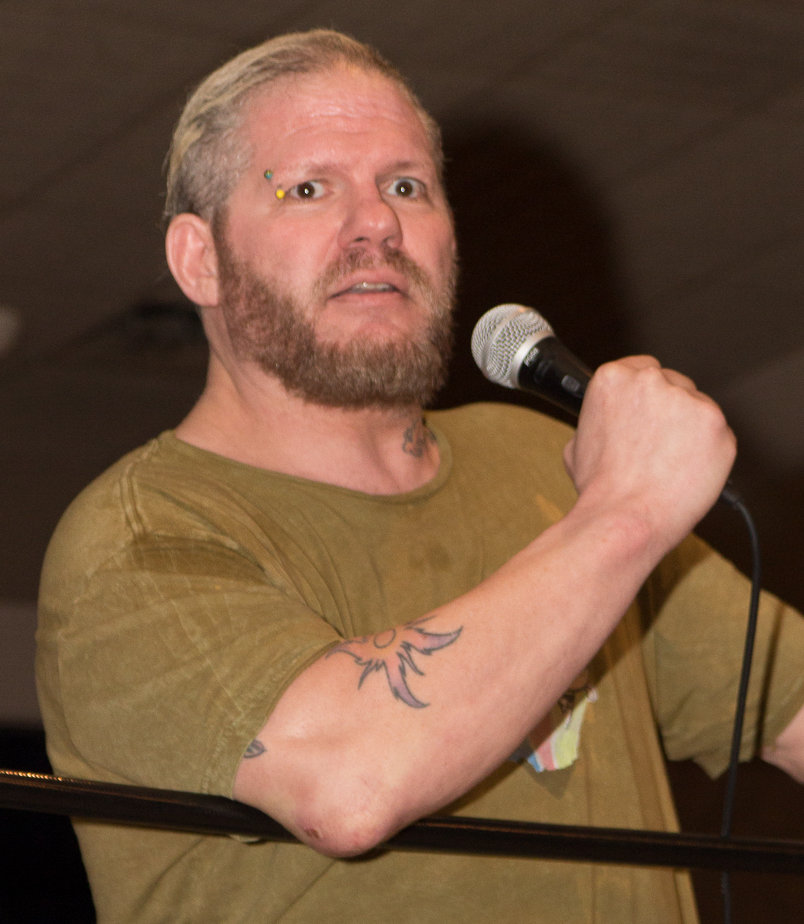
Raven, who held the Hardcore Championship a record 27 times.

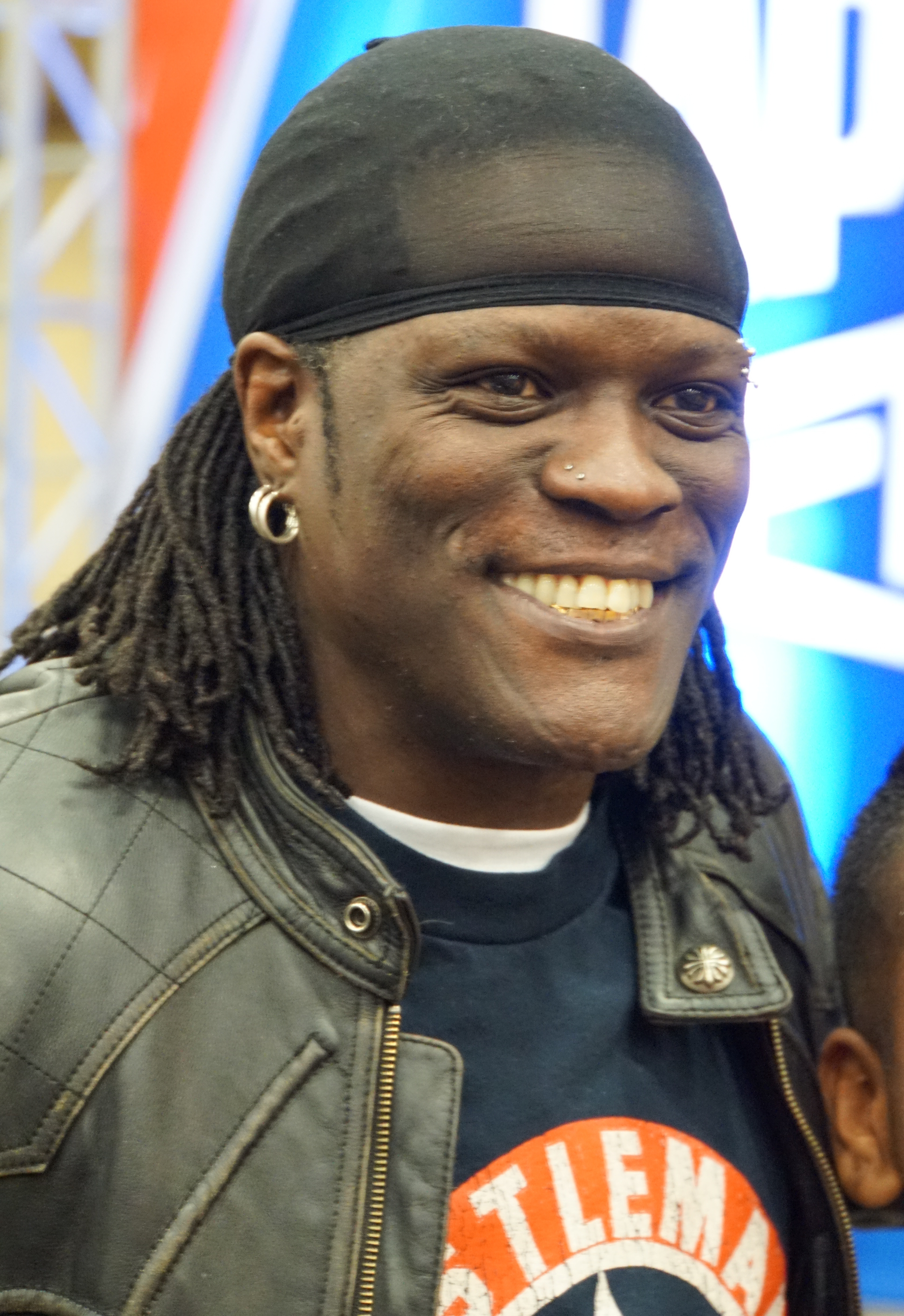
R-Truth, who had a record 54 reigns as 24/7 Champion.

Championship	Date of entry	First champion	Date retired	Final champion	Years active	Notes
WWE Hardcore Championship	November 2, 1998	Mankind	August 26, 2002	Rob Van Dam	3	The title was retired after it was unified into the WWE Intercontinental Championship.
WWE 24/7 Championship	May 20, 2019	Titus O'Neil	November 9, 2022	Nikki Cross	3	After winning the title on the November 7, 2022, episode of Raw, Nikki Cross discarded the belt in a trash can backstage. Two days later, the title was listed as inactive on WWE.com.

== Other championships previously used by WWE ==
Promotion	Championship	Last WWE champion(s)	Reign	Reference
Evolve	Evolve Tag Team Championship (Note: The championship was defended during WWE's 2018 WrestleMania Axxess events.)	Chris Dickinson and Jaka	September 23, 2017 – October 28, 2018	
Georgia Championship Wrestling	NWA National Heavyweight Championship (Note: The championship was defended on WWF events in Georgia after the WWF's takeover of Georgia Championship Wrestling. The championship was referred to simply as the "National Heavyweight Championship" by the WWF, though some sources erroneously list it as the "WWF National Championship".)	The Spoiler	1984 – 1985	
Georgia Championship Wrestling	NWA World Junior Heavyweight Championship (Note: The championship was defended on WWF events in Georgia after the WWF's takeover of Georgia Championship Wrestling. The championship was referred to as the "WWF Lt. Hvywt Championship" by the WWF.)	Les Thornton	1984 – 1985	
Insane Championship Wrestling	ICW World Heavyweight Championship (Note: The championship was defended during WWE's 2017 WrestleMania Axxess events.)	Trent Seven	February 5, 2017 – April 16, 2017	
National Wrestling Alliance	NWA World Heavyweight Championship (Note: Three championships from the National Wrestling Alliance (NWA) were brought to the WWF to be defended as part of the 1997–1998 NWA invasion storyline.)	Dan Severn	February 24, 1995 – March 14, 1999 (Note: During Dan Severn's reign, the NWA World Heavyweight Championship was brought to the WWF, along with other National Wrestling Alliance (NWA) championships, as part of the 1997–1998 NWA invasion storyline. The NWA World Heavyweight Championship was previously the WWF's world heavyweight championship from 1953–1963 and again from 1971–1983 during the WWF's membership in the NWA.)	
National Wrestling Alliance	NWA North American Championship	Barry Windham	March 1, 1998 – March 2, 1998	
National Wrestling Alliance	NWA World Tag Team Championship	Bodacious Bart and Bombastic Bob (The Midnight Express)	March 30, 1998 – August 14, 1998	
Ohio Valley Wrestling	OVW Southern Tag Team Championship	Aaron Stevens and Nova	October 10, 2003 – March 4, 2004	
Progress Wrestling	Progress World Championship	Travis Banks	September 10, 2017 – July 25, 2018	
Progress Wrestling	Progress Women's Championship	Toni Storm	May 28, 2017 – May 20, 2018	
Progress Wrestling	Progress Tag Team Championship	James Drake and Zack Gibson (Grizzled Young Veterans)	November 26, 2017 – February 11, 2018	
Smoky Mountain Wrestling	SMW Tag Team Championship	Jimmy Del Ray and Tom Prichard	November 24, 1993 – February 18, 1994	
Total Nonstop Action Wrestling	TNA World Championship	Trick Williams	May 25, 2025 – October 12, 2025	
Total Nonstop Action Wrestling	TNA Knockouts World Championship	Léi Yǐng Lee	November 18, 2025 – February 13, 2026	
Total Nonstop Action Wrestling	TNA X Division Championship	Leon Slater	July 20, 2025 – present	
Total Nonstop Action Wrestling	TNA World Tag Team Championship	The Hardys (Matt Hardy and Jeff Hardy)	July 20, 2025 – present	
Total Nonstop Action Wrestling	TNA Knockouts World Tag Team Championship	The Elegance Brand (Ash by Elegance, Heather by Elegance, and M by Elegance)	March 14, 2025 – September 27, 2025	
Total Nonstop Action Wrestling	TNA International Championship	Channing "Stacks" Lorenzo	December 5, 2025 – February 13, 2026	
Upstate Wrestling (Note: Upstate Wrestling was the WWWF's Buffalo, New York-based promotional partner.)	NWA North American Heavyweight Championship (Upstate version) (Note: The championship was defended at WWWF house shows in Buffalo, New York throughout 1974. The championship was referred to as the "NWA North American Heavyweight Championship" by the WWWF, though some sources erroneously list it as the "WWF North American Heavyweight Championship".)	Stan Stasiak	June 24, 1974 – November 18, 1974	
World Wide Wrestling Association (Note: The World Wide Wrestling Association (WWWA) was a parallel promotion ran in conjunction with the-then World Wide Wrestling Federation by Vincent J. McMahon, Toots Mondt, and Ohio promoter Larry Atkins.)	WWWA World Heavyweight Championship (Note: The championship was defended on WWWF house shows in Ohio before being replaced by the WWWF World Heavyweight Championship.)	Bruno Sammartino	November 1963	
World Wide Wrestling Association	WWWA World Tag Team Championship (Note: The championship was originally introduced as the WWWA American Tag Team Championship. The championship was defended on WWWF house shows in Ohio before being replaced by the WWWF World Tag Team Championship.)	Chris Tolos and John Tolos	December 1963	
World Wrestling Network	WWN Championship	Austin Theory	April 6, 2018 – June 23, 2018	

== See also ==
- List of current champions in WWE
- List of WWE alumni
- List of WWE tournaments

== Footnotes ==
- A:^{a} ^{b} – The title was officially abandoned by the WWF in 1989, though the physical belt was revived by NJPW to represent its Greatest 18 Club Championship, that championship was discontinued by NJPW in 1992.
- B:^{a} ^{b} ^{c} – This is the date the WWF acquired WCW, in which WCW's assets were also acquired by WWF, including its titles.
- C:^{a} ^{b} ^{c} – The first title holder in the WWF as a part of The Invasion storyline.
- D:^{a} – This is the date the WWF began operating the title in the United States; the championship had been active since March 26, 1981 being used by the WWF's partners the UWA and NJPW.
- E:^{a} – This is the date WWE launched the ECW program, during which Rob Van Dam was awarded the title as a result of winning the WWE Championship on June 11, 2006.
- F:^{a} - This is the date upon which WWE consolidated the unification of both its tag team championships, and continued to recognize only one championship to be contended in its tag team division.
