= WWE Speed Championship =

Former men's professional wrestling championship

- The WWE Speed Championship belt with default side plates

Details
- Promotion: WWE
- Brand: NXT
- Date established: March 27, 2024
- Date retired: September 1, 2026
Statistics
- First champion: Ricochet
- Final champion: Lexis King
- Longest reign: El Grande Americano (190 days) (Note: WWE officially recognizes 188 days due to tape delay. The character was originally portrayed by Chad Gable until June 30, 2025, when Ludwig Kaiser took over due to Gable's injury, with Gable holding the title for 56 days (54 days as recognized by WWE) and Kaiser holding it for 134 days.)
- Shortest reign: Elio LeFleur (35 days) (Note: WWE officially recognizes 34 days.)
- Oldest champion: El Grande Americano (Note: As portrayed by Chad Gable.) (39 years, 58 days)
- Youngest champion: Elio LeFleur (27 years, 5 days)
- Heaviest champion: Jasper Troy (340 lb (150 kg))
- Lightest champion: Dragon Lee (165 lb (75 kg))

The WWE Speed Championship was a men's professional wrestling championship created and promoted by the American promotion WWE. Established on March 27, 2024, it was a specialized championship in which matches had a five-minute time limit. The inaugural champion was Ricochet. The title was retired on the September 1, 2026, episode of NXT in conjunction with the retirement of the WWE Women's Speed Championship two days prior. The final champion was Lexis King.

When the title was originally introduced, it was regarded as an internet championship and it was open to wrestlers from the Raw, SmackDown, and NXT brands as the title was exclusively defended on the online program Speed. Following the cancellation of Speed, the title was officially moved to the NXT brand on August 24, 2025, but still open to challengers from Raw and SmackDown, as well as the Evolve brand and WWE ID program, and wrestlers from partner promotion Total Nonstop Action Wrestling and Mexican sister promotion Lucha Libre AAA Worldwide. Contendership for the championship was determined by single-elimination tournaments, the matches of which had a three-minute time limit. Title matches were typically contested as singles matches.

== History ==
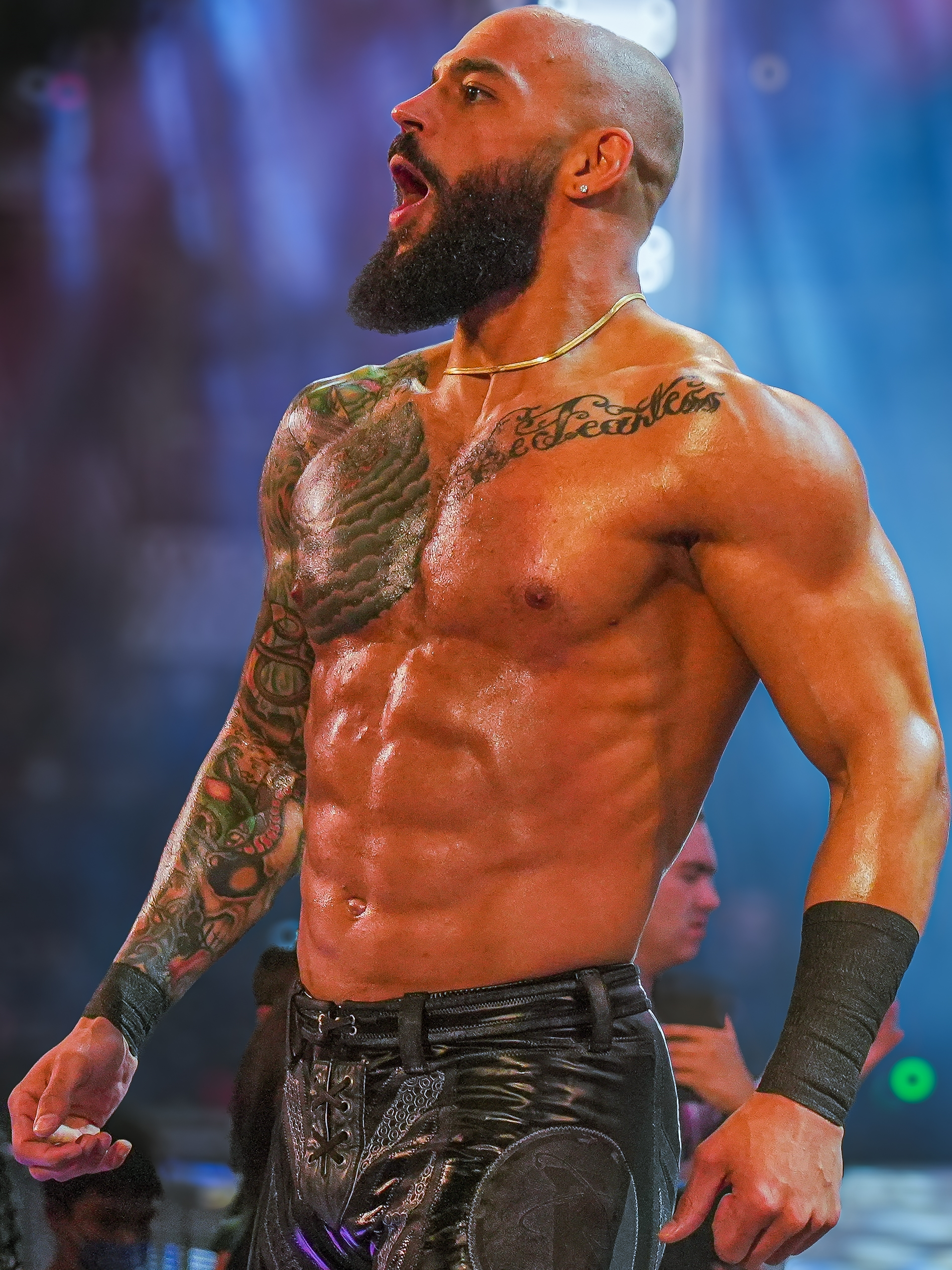
Inaugural champion Ricochet

On February 9, 2024, the American professional wrestling promotion WWE announced a partnership with X to introduce Speed, a weekly video series to stream exclusively on the social media platform where wrestlers would perform in matches with a five-minute time limit. The following month on March 27, WWE commentator Corey Graves announced that Speed would premiere on April 3, 2024, but regular matches would instead be three minutes in length. An eight-man tournament was also announced to crown the inaugural WWE Speed Champion that would take place over the first few episodes of the program. It was also revealed that male wrestlers from WWE's Raw, SmackDown, and NXT brands were eligible to challenge for the title.

The inaugural Speed Championship tournament final, which was taped in Cincinnati, Ohio on April 26, 2024, and aired on tape delay on May 3, saw Ricochet defeat Johnny Gargano to become the inaugural champion. This tournament final also confirmed that the championship matches would have a duration of five minutes instead of Speed's regular three-minute length. On the July 17 episode, Ilja Dragunov and Carmelo Hayes fought to Speed's first time-limit draw in their semifinal match. It was decided that both men were eliminated from the tournament with the winner of the other semifinal, Baron Corbin, receiving a bye to the tournament final to face Andrade for the title.

Following the July 9, 2025, episode, the future of Speed came into question as the series stopped uploading new episodes without explanation. Various news outlets began reporting that the program had been quietly cancelled, but neither WWE or X made any statements on the show's status. Wrestling journalist Dave Meltzer further clarified that WWE had not taped any episodes after July 9 and his WWE contacts had no knowledge on the program's future. Around the same time, reigning Women's Speed Champion Sol Ruca began appearing on NXT with the title. In an interview on August 19, Ruca said that the Speed Championships previously only appeared on Speed as it was "a separate universe being on X". She was then given permission by WWE to carry the title on NXT programming. A few days later at Heatwave, NXT general manager Ava announced that the men's and women's Speed Championships would be defended on the NXT brand going forward, with qualifying tournaments open to wrestlers from the Raw, SmackDown, and Evolve brands as well as wrestlers from WWE's partner promotion Total Nonstop Action Wrestling (TNA) and Mexican subsidiary Lucha Libre AAA Worldwide (AAA), starting from the September 2 episode of NXT. On the October 14 episode of NXT, Ava announced the men's tournament would restart on the October 21 episode. Axiom (SmackDown), Sean Legacy (listed as Evolve), Zachary Wentz (TNA), and Jasper Troy (NXT) would contest for #1 Contendership against El Grande Americano (listed as AAA).

The title was contested for the first time in a triple threat match on the February 24, 2026, episode of NXT. After a draw between Eli Knight and Elio LeFleur in their number one contender's tournament final the prior week, reigning champion Jasper Troy decided that he would defend the Speed Championship against both in a triple threat match. Interim NXT General Manager Robert Stone also increased the time limit to seven minutes for the occasion. LeFleur subsequently defeated Troy and Knight to win the title.

The championship was retired on September 1, 2026. After the Women's Speed Championship was retired in a unification match on August 30 at Heatwave, NXT General Manager Robert Stone announced on NXT that the men's Speed Championship was also retired and had reigning champion Lexis King relinquish the title. According to a report, both titles were not retired sooner as WWE had hoped that another deal with X could have been made to relaunch the Speed program.

== Tournaments ==
=== Summary ===
Won title by defeating the reigning champion
Won vacant title
Failed to win title

No.	Tournament winner	No.	Championship match			
No.	Tournament winner	No.	Opponent	Event	Filming date	Broadcast date
1	Ricochet	1	Johnny Gargano	Speed	April 26, 2024	May 3, 2024
2	Tyler Bate	1	Ricochet (c)	Speed	May 20, 2024	May 24, 2024
3	Andrade	1	Ricochet (c)	Speed	June 7, 2024	June 14, 2024
4	Xavier Woods	1	Andrade (c)	Speed	June 28, 2024	July 5, 2024
5	Baron Corbin	1	Andrade (c)	Speed	July 19, 2024	July 24, 2024
6	Pete Dunne	1	Andrade (c)	Speed	August 23, 2024	August 30, 2024
7	Dragon Lee	1	Andrade (c)	Speed	November 15, 2024	November 20, 2024
8	Chad Gable	1	Dragon Lee (c)	Speed	January 31, 2025	February 1, 2025
9	Ivar	1	Dragon Lee (c)	Speed	March 7, 2025	March 19, 2025
10	El Grande Americano (Note: El Grande Americano was portrayed by Chad Gable at the time, who previously won the tournament as himself.)	2	Dragon Lee (c)	Speed	May 5, 2025	May 7, 2025
11	Berto	1	El Grande Americano (c)	Speed	June 17, 2025	June 18, 2025
12	Jasper Troy	1	El Grande Americano (c) (Note: El Grande Americano was portrayed by Ludwig Kaiser, who replaced Chad Gable in the role on June 30 due to injury.)	NXT	November 11, 2025	
13	Tavion Heights	1	Jasper Troy (c)	NXT	January 13, 2026	
14	Elio Lefleur (Note: The tournament final between Elio Lefleur and Eli Knight ended in a time limit draw, making them the co-winners. Interim NXT General Manager Robert Stone announced a triple threat match among defending champion Jasper Troy and the co-winners of the tournament for the WWE Speed Championship.)	1	Jasper Troy (c)	NXT	February 24, 2026	
14	Eli Knight	1	Jasper Troy (c)	NXT	February 24, 2026	
15	Lexis King	1	EK Prosper	NXT: Revenge; Week 2	April 21, 2026	
16	Romeo Moreno	1	Lexis King (c)	NXT	June 2, 2026	
(c) – denotes the defending champion

=== Inaugural tournament ===
The WWE Speed Championship Tournament was a tournament to crown the first-ever WWE Speed Champion, the flagship championship of WWE Speed. It concluded on April 26, 2024, with Ricochet defeating Johnny Gargano.

Tournament bracket

Quarterfinals; Speed; March 29 – April 12, 2024 (Aired: April 3–17)
Raw	Ricochet	Pinfall
Raw	Dragon Lee	2:57
Raw	JD McDonagh	Pinfall
NXT	Axiom	2:26
Raw	Bronson Reed	Pinfall
SmackDown	Cedric Alexander	1:50
SmackDown	Johnny Gargano	Pinfall
SmackDown	Angel	2:08

Semifinals; Speed; April 15–26, 2024 (Aired: April 24 – May 1)
Raw	Ricochet	Pinfall
Raw	JD McDonagh	1:58
Raw	Bronson Reed	2:23
SmackDown	Johnny Gargano	Pinfall

Final; Speed; April 26, 2024 (Aired: May 3)
Raw	Ricochet	Pinfall
SmackDown	Johnny Gargano	4:21

=== WWE Speed Championship Tournament (2026) ===
This tournament was held to crown the new WWE Speed Champion after champion Elio LeFleur had to vacate the title due to a shoulder injury. The tournament began on the April 7, 2026, episode of NXT.

Tournament bracket

1st Round; NXT; April 7, 2026; NXT: Revenge; April 14, 2026
NXT	Lexis King	Pinfall
Evolve	Chazz "Starboy" Hall	2:06
NXT	EK Prosper	Pinfall
Evolve	Dorian Van Dux	2:53

Final; NXT: Revenge; April 21, 2026
NXT	Lexis King	Pinfall
NXT	EK Prosper	4:32

=== No. 1 contender's tournaments ===
Tournament brackets

1 May 8–24, 2024

1st Round; Speed; April 29 – May 10, 2024 (Aired: May 8–15)
SmackDown	Apollo Crews	1:56
Raw	Ivar	Pinfall
Raw	Tyler Bate	Pinfall
SmackDown	Berto	2:55

Final; Speed; May 17, 2024 (Aired: May 22)
SmackDown	Apollo Crews (Note: Apollo Crews replaced the injured Ivar.)	2:05
Raw	Tyler Bate	Pinfall

Championship match Speed; May 20, 2024 (Aired: May 24)
Raw	Ricochet (c)	Pinfall
Raw	Tyler Bate	3:09

2 May 29 – June 14, 2024

1st Round; Speed; May 24–31, 2024 (Aired: May 29 – June 6)
SmackDown	Tommaso Ciampa	Pinfall
Raw	Ludwig Kaiser	2:54
SmackDown	Andrade	Pinfall
SmackDown	Karl Anderson	0:46

Final; Speed; June 7, 2024 (Aired: June 12)
SmackDown	Tommaso Ciampa	1:53
SmackDown	Andrade	Pinfall

Championship match Speed; June 7, 2024 (Aired: June 14)
Raw	Ricochet (c)	4:02
SmackDown	Andrade	Pinfall

3 June 19 – July 5, 2024

1st Round; Speed; June 10–21, 2024 (Aired: June 19–26)
Raw	Xavier Woods	Pinfall
Raw	Dijak	2:50
NXT	Nathan Frazer	Pinfall
Raw	Akira Tozawa	2:20

Final; Speed; June 28, 2024 (Aired: July 3)
Raw	Xavier Woods	Pinfall
NXT	Nathan Frazer	2:48

Championship match Speed; June 28, 2024 (Aired: July 5)
SmackDown	Andrade (c)	Pinfall
Raw	Xavier Woods	4:25

4 July 10–24, 2024

1st Round; Speed; July 5–12, 2024 (Aired: July 10–17)
SmackDown	Baron Corbin	Pinfall
SmackDown	Angelo Dawkins	2:49
Raw	Ilja Dragunov	3-min. broadway
SmackDown	Carmelo Hayes	3-min. broadway

Championship match Speed; July 19, 2024 (Aired: July 24)
SmackDown	Andrade (c)	Pinfall
SmackDown	Baron Corbin	4:12

5 July 31 – August 30, 2024

1st Round; Speed; July 22 – August 2, 2024 (Aired: July 31 – August 14)
Raw	Joaquin Wilde	Pinfall
NXT	Axiom	2:57
Raw	Pete Dunne	Pinfall
Raw	Julius Creed	2:36
SmackDown	Austin Theory	3-min. broadway
SmackDown	Montez Ford	3-min. broadway
NXT	Je'Von Evans	Pinfall
NXT	Ashante "Thee" Adonis	2:34

Semifinals; Speed; August 12, 2024 (Aired: August 21)
Raw	Joaquin Wilde	2:37
Raw	Pete Dunne	Pinfall
—	N/A	—
NXT	Je'Von Evans	Bye

Final; Speed; August 16, 2024 (Aired: August 28)
Raw	Pete Dunne	Pinfall
NXT	Je'Von Evans	2:23

Championship match Speed; August 23, 2024 (Aired: August 30)
SmackDown	Andrade (c)	Pinfall
Raw	Pete Dunne	4:12

6 October 16 – November 20, 2024

1st Round; Speed; October 11–25, 2024 (Aired: October 16 – November 1)
Raw	Sheamus	Pinfall
SmackDown	Giovanni Vinci	2:27
Raw	Bron Breakker	Pinfall
Raw	Cruz Del Toro	1:04
Raw	Dragon Lee	Pinfall
NXT	Tavion Heights	2:10
Raw	Akira Tozawa	Pinfall
NXT	Riley Osborne	1:46

Semifinals; Speed; October 28, 2024 (Aired: November 6)
Raw	Sheamus	3-min. broadway
Raw	Bron Breakker	3-min. broadway
Raw	Dragon Lee	Pinfall
Raw	Akira Tozawa	2:39

Championship match Speed; November 15, 2024 (Aired: November 20)
SmackDown	Andrade (c)	4:26
Raw	Dragon Lee	Pinfall

7 January 15 – February 1, 2025

1st Round; Speed; January 10–17, 2025 (Aired: January 15–22)
NXT	Charlie Dempsey	2:57
Raw	Chad Gable	Pinfall
SmackDown	Chris Sabin	Pinfall
SmackDown	Grayson Waller	2:37

Final; Speed; January 24, 2025 (Aired: January 29)
Raw	Chad Gable	Pinfall
SmackDown	Chris Sabin	2:42

Championship match Speed; January 31, 2025 (Aired: February 1)
Raw	Dragon Lee (c)	Pinfall
Raw	Chad Gable	4:23

8 February 28 – March 19, 2025

1st Round; Speed; February 21–28, 2025 (Aired: February 28 – March 5)
SmackDown	Chris Sabin	2:16
Raw	Dominik Mysterio	Pinfall
Raw	Ivar	Pinfall
NXT	Yoshiki Inamura	2:22

Final; Speed; March 7, 2025 (Aired: March 12)
Raw	Dominik Mysterio	1:40
Raw	Ivar	Pinfall

Championship match Speed; March 7, 2025 (Aired: March 19)
Raw	Dragon Lee (c)	Pinfall
Raw	Ivar	3:30

9 April 18 – May 7, 2025

1st Round; Speed; April 11–14, 2025 (Aired: April 18–23)
SmackDown	Alex Shelley	Pinfall
NXT	Wes Lee	2:01
Raw	El Grande Americano (Note: El Grande Americano was portrayed by Chad Gable at the time.)	Pinfall
Raw	Erik	2:19

Final; Speed; April 25, 2025 (Aired: April 30)
SmackDown	Alex Shelley	2:21
Raw	El Grande Americano	Pinfall

Championship match Speed; May 5, 2025 (Aired: May 7)
Raw	Dragon Lee (c)	3:53
Raw	El Grande Americano	Pinfall

10 June 4–18, 2025

1st Round; Speed; May 30 – June 3, 2025 (Aired: June 4–6)
SmackDown	Kit Wilson	2:14
SmackDown	Berto	Pinfall
NXT	Noam Dar (Note: Joaquin Wilde originally faced Lexis King in the first round at the June 2, 2025, taping of Speed, but the match was stopped after Wilde was concussed. King would instead face Noam Dar in the first round.)	Pinfall
NXT	Lexis King	2:43

Final; Speed; June 6, 2025 (Aired: June 11)
SmackDown	Berto	Pinfall
NXT	Noam Dar	2:34

Championship match Speed; June 17, 2025 (Aired: June 18)
Raw	El Grande Americano (Note: El Grande Americano was portrayed by Chad Gable at the time) (c)	Pinfall
SmackDown	Berto	3:44

11 October 21 – November 11, 2025

1st Round; NXT; October 21, 2025
SmackDown	Axiom	Pinfall
Evolve	Sean Legacy	2:57
NXT	Jasper Troy	Pinfall
TNA	Zachary Wentz	2:04

Final; NXT; October 21, 2025
SmackDown	Axiom	2:54
NXT	Jasper Troy	Pinfall

Championship match NXT; November 11, 2025
Raw	El Grande Americano (Note: El Grande Americano was portrayed by Ludwig Kaiser, who replaced Chad Gable in the role on June 30 due to injury.) (c)	4:42
NXT	Jasper Troy	Pinfall

12 December 17, 2025 – January 13, 2026

1st Round; NXT; December 17, 2025 (Aired: December 23)
NXT	Tavion Heights	Pinfall
Evolve	Eli Knight	2:00
NXT	Andre Chase	2:46
NXT	Lexis King	Pinfall

Final; NXT; December 17, 2025 (Aired: December 30)
NXT	Tavion Heights	Pinfall
NXT	Lexis King	0:08

Championship match NXT; January 13, 2026
NXT	Jasper Troy (c)	Pinfall
NXT	Tavion Heights	4:09

13 February 3–24, 2026

1st Round; NXT; February 3–10, 2026
Elio Lefleur	Pinfall
Charlie Dempsey	2:53
Josh Briggs	2:06
Eli Knight	Pinfall

Final; NXT; February 17, 2026
Elio Lefleur	3-min. broadway
Eli Knight	3-min. broadway

Championship match NXT; February 24, 2026
Jasper Troy (c)	5:49
Elio Lefleur	Pinfall
Eli Knight	—

14 May 26 – June 2, 2026

This tournament was billed as an international tournament.

1st Round; NXT; May 26, 2026
NXT	(United States) Sean Legacy	3-min. broadway
Evolve	(Belgium) Dorian Van Dux	3-min. broadway
SmackDown	(Jersey) Nathan Frazer	2:58
Evolve	(Spain) Romeo Moreno	Pinfall

Championship match NXT; June 2, 2026
NXT	(United States) Lexis King (c)	Pinfall
Evolve	(Spain) Romeo Moreno	4:34

== Reigns ==
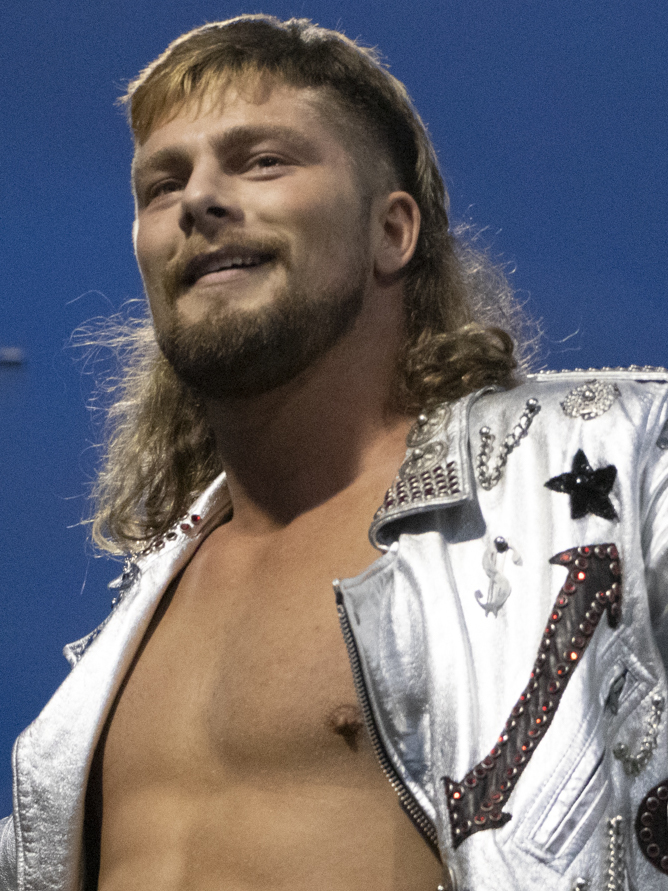
Final champion Lexis King

Over the title's two-year history, there were seven reigns between seven champions (eight when counting two wrestlers portraying the same character) and one vacancy. The inaugural champion was Ricochet. El Grande Americano was recognized for having the longest reign at 190 days (188 days as recognized by WWE due to tape delay); Americano was originally portrayed by Chad Gable until June 30, 2025, when Ludwig Kaiser took over due to Gable's injury, with Gable holding the title for 56 days (54 days as recognized by WWE) and Kaiser holding it for 134 days. Elio LeFleur had the shortest reign at 35 days (34 days as recognized by WWE). Gable, as Americano, was also the oldest champion at 39, while Jasper Troy was the youngest at 25–26. Lexis King was the final champion.

Key
No.	Overall reign number
Reign	Reign number for the specific champion
Days	Number of days held
Days recog.	Number of days held recognized by the promotion

No.	Champion	Championship change			Reign statistics			Notes	Ref.
No.	Champion	Date	Event	Location	Reign	Days	Days recog.	Notes	Ref.
WWE: Raw, SmackDown, and NXT
1	Ricochet	April 26, 2024	Speed	Cincinnati, OH	1	42	42	Defeated Johnny Gargano in the tournament final to become the inaugural champion. WWE recognizes Ricochet's reign as beginning on May 3, 2024, and ending on June 14, 2024, when the episodes aired on tape delay.	
2	Andrade	June 7, 2024	Speed	Louisville, KY	1	161	159	WWE recognizes Andrade's reign as beginning on June 14, 2024, and ending on November 20, 2024, when the episodes aired on tape delay.	
3	Dragon Lee	November 15, 2024	Speed	Milwaukee, WI	1	171	167	WWE recognizes Lee's reign as beginning on November 20, 2024, and ending on May 7, 2025, when the episodes aired on tape delay.	
4	El Grande Americano (Chad Gable/Ludwig Kaiser)	May 5, 2025	Speed	Omaha, NE	1	190	188	WWE recognizes Americano's reign as beginning on May 7, 2025, when the episode aired on tape delay. Chad Gable portrayed the Americano character when he won the title, but after he suffered a legitmate shoulder injury, Ludwig Kaiser took over the character on June 30, 2025. On August 24, 2025, at Heatwave, NXT general manager Ava announced that the championship would be defended on the NXT brand going forward, but still open to challengers from WWE's other brands, including Evolve and WWE ID, as well as wrestlers from partner promotion Total Nonstop Action Wrestling and sister promotion Lucha Libre AAA Worldwide.	
WWE: NXT
5	Jasper Troy	November 11, 2025	NXT	Orlando, FL	1	105	105		
6	Elio LeFleur	February 24, 2026	NXT	Orlando, FL	1	35	34	This was a triple threat match with a seven-minute time limit that also involved Eli Knight.	
—	Vacated	March 31, 2026	NXT	New York, NY	—	—	—	Elio LeFleur vacated the title due to a shoulder injury.	
7	Lexis King	April 21, 2026	NXT: Revenge; Week 2	Orlando, FL	1	133	133	Defeated EK Prosper in a tournament final to win the vacant title.	
—	Deactivated	September 1, 2026	NXT	Orlando, FL	—	—	—	Following the retirement of the WWE Women's Speed Championship at Heatwave on August 30, 2026, NXT General Manager Robert Stone had Lexis King relinquish the WWE Speed Championship and subsequently retired it.	

== See also ==
- List of former championships in WWE
