= Jasper Troy =

American professional wrestler (born 1998)

Personal information
- Born: Antione Frazier; May 20, 1998 (age 28) Huffman, Texas, U.S.

Professional wrestling career
- Ring name(s): Jasper Troy; Kairo D. Reign
- Billed height: 6 ft 5 in (1.96 m)
- Billed weight: 340 lb (150 kg)
- Billed from: Huffman, Texas
- Trained by: Booker T Johnny Moss; Matt Bloom; Robbie Brookside; WWE Performance Center
- Debut: May 13, 2023

Antione Frazier (born May 20, 1998) is an American professional wrestler. He is performing on the independent circuit under the ring name Kairo D. Reign. He is best known for his time in WWE, where he performed under the ring name Jasper Troy. He is a former one-time WWE Speed Champion and the men's winner of the inaugural season of LFG in 2025.

== Early life ==
Frazier was born in Huffman, Texas and attended Hargrave High School, where he played football and earned Class 10-2A all-district honors in 2015. He was rated a three-star prospect by ESPN and 247Sports.com and received recruiting interest from several programs, including Iowa, Houston, and Texas A&M.

Frazier began his collegiate football career at the University of Kansas. In 2016, he saw action on the offensive line and special teams in all 12 games. The following year, he played in 11 games, starting three at right tackle against Southeast Missouri State, Central Michigan, and Ohio. In 2018, he appeared in all 12 games, contributing on the offensive line and special teams.

After his tenure at Kansas, Frazier transferred to the University of Northern Iowa. During the spring 2021 season, he started all seven games, primarily at right tackle, and also started at left tackle against Missouri State and Illinois State. In the fall 2021 season, he played in nine games, starting eight on the offensive line.

== Professional wrestling career ==
=== WWE (2022–2026) ===
Frazier signed with WWE in August 2022 and began training at the WWE Performance Center. He made his in-ring debut under his real name at an NXT live event on May 13, 2023. His televised debut under the ring name Jasper Troy occurred on the May 17, 2024, episode of NXT Level Up, where he faced Tavion Heights. In 2025, Troy participated in the inaugural season of LFG (Legends & Future Greats), a competition for WWE Performance Center recruits, where he was mentored by Booker T. Troy emerged victorious, defeating Shiloh Hill in the finals. Following his win, Troy returned to NXT, wrestling Oba Femi for the NXT Championship on the June 10 episode, but Troy was defeated.

Troy defeated El Grande Americano (II) to win the WWE Speed Championship on the November 12, 2025 episode of NXT. On the February 24, 2026 episode of NXT, he lost the title to Elio Lefleur in a seven-minute Speed Championship triple threat match also involving Eli Knight, ending his reign at 105 days. On the March 17 episode of NXT, Troy turned face by attacking Keanu Carver as the latter interrupted Booker T Appreciation Night. Troy was defeated by Carver on the March 31 episode of NXT after being attacked by special referee Josh Briggs during an altercation. Carver, Troy and Briggs would face each other in a triple threat match on the April 7 episode, with Carver winning the match. On September 4, Troy was released from WWE.

=== Independent circuit (2026–present) ===
Frazier made his first post-WWE appearance under the name Kairo D. Reign on October 17, 2026 at America's Most Liked Wrestling (AML)'s event All For The Glory, where he was defeated by Beer City Bruiser.

== Championships and accomplishments ==
- Pro Wrestling Illustrated
  - Ranked No. 141 of the top 500 singles wrestlers in the PWI 500 in 2025
- WWE
  - WWE Speed Championship (1 time)
  - WWE Speed Championship #1 Contender Tournament (October 21 – November 11, 2025)
  - Men's LFG Winner (Season 1)
