= Warrior Wrestling =

American professional wrestling promotion

- Founded: 2018
- Headquarters: Chicago Heights, Illinois, U.S.
- Founder: Steve Tortorello

Warrior Wrestling is an American independent professional wrestling promotion founded in 2018 by Steve Tortorello in Chicago Heights, Illinois. It originated as a fundraising venture for Marian Catholic High School.

== History ==
Tortorello, then principal of Marian Catholic High School, developed Warrior Wrestling with teacher Eric Hamilton. The school backed the project, and revenue after costs was directed to student scholarships.

By December 2019, Warrior Wrestling had presented seven events in Chicago Heights; its seventh event was the promotion's first broadcast on Fite TV. In October 2025, the promotion announced Resurrection, its first event since May 2024, scheduled for December in Chicago.

== Championships ==
Warrior Wrestling has staged matches for the Warrior Wrestling Championship, Warrior Women's Championship, and Warrior Lucha Championship.
