= WWE Women's Speed Championship =

Former women's professional wrestling championship

- The WWE Women's Speed Championship belt with default side plates

Details
- Promotion: WWE
- Brand: NXT
- Date established: August 9, 2024
- Date retired: August 30, 2026 (unified with the NXT Women's North American Championship)
Statistics
- First champion: Candice LeRae
- Final champion: Wren Sinclair
- Longest reign: Sol Ruca (200 days) (Note: 195 days as recognized by WWE due to tape delay.)
- Shortest reign: Fallon Henley (119 days) (Note: 112 days as recognized by WWE due to tape delay.)
- Oldest champion: Candice LeRae (39 years, 5 days)
- Youngest champion: Sol Ruca (25 years, 228 days)
- Heaviest champion: Zaria (175 lb (79 kg))
- Lightest champion: Candice LeRae (110 lb (50 kg))

The WWE Women's Speed Championship was a women's professional wrestling championship created and promoted by the American promotion WWE. Established on August 9, 2024, it was a specialized championship in which matches had a five-minute time limit. The inaugural champion was Candice LeRae. The title was retired when it was unified with the NXT Women's North American Championship at Heatwave on August 30, 2026, with Wren Sinclair recognized as the final champion.

When the title was originally introduced, it was regarded as an internet championship and it was open to wrestlers from the Raw, SmackDown, and NXT brands as the title was exclusively defended on the online program Speed. Following the cancellation of Speed, the title was officially moved to the NXT brand on August 24, 2025, but still open to challengers from Raw and SmackDown, as well as the Evolve brand and WWE ID program, and wrestlers from partner promotion Total Nonstop Action Wrestling and Mexican subsidiary Lucha Libre AAA Worldwide. Contendernship for the championship was determined by single-elimination tournaments, the matches of which had a three-minute time limit. Title matches were typically contested as singles matches.

== History ==
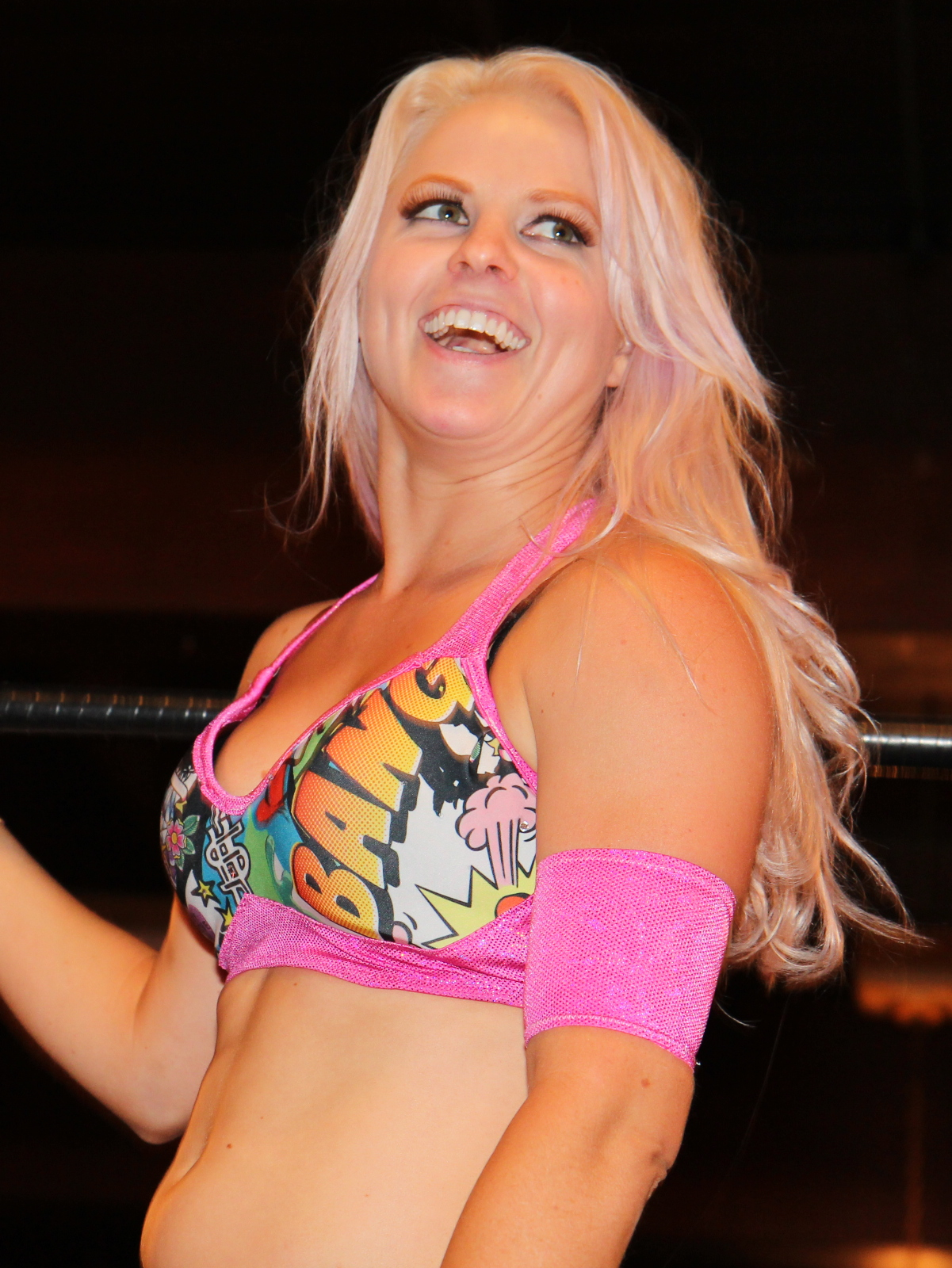
Inaugural champion Candice LeRae

On April 3, 2024, the American professional wrestling promotion WWE launched Speed, a weekly video series that streamed exclusively on the social media platform X. The program featured matches between wrestlers from WWE's Raw, SmackDown, and NXT brands and the matches had a three-minute time limit for regular episodes. Speed originally only featured matches with male wrestlers, with special episodes for the WWE Speed Championship having a five-minute time limit.

On May 1, 2024, WWE Chief Content Officer Paul "Triple H" Levesque confirmed that the program would also eventually feature women's matches. This led to an official announcement on August 9, 2024, where it was revealed that a tournament for the inaugural WWE Women's Speed Championship would begin on September 4, 2024. In the tournament final that occurred during the Speed tapings on October 4, 2024, SmackDown's Candice LeRae defeated Raw's Iyo Sky to become the inaugural champion. Her reign is recognized as having begun on October 9, 2024, when the match aired on tape delay.

Following the July 9, 2025, episode, the future of Speed came into question as the series stopped uploading new episodes without explanation. Various news outlets began reporting that the program had been quietly cancelled, but neither WWE or X made any statements on the show's status. Wrestling journalist Dave Meltzer further clarified that WWE had not taped any episodes after July 9 and his WWE contacts had no knowledge on the program's future. Around the same time, reigning champion Sol Ruca began appearing on NXT with the title. In an interview on August 19, Ruca said that the Speed Championships previously only appeared on Speed as it was "a separate universe being on X" and was then given permission by WWE to carry the title on NXT programming. A few days later at Heatwave, NXT general manager Ava announced that the men's and women's Speed Championships would be defended on the NXT brand going forward, with qualifying tournaments open to wrestlers from the Raw, SmackDown, and Evolve brands, partner promotion Total Nonstop Action Wrestling (TNA), and Mexican subsidiary Lucha Libre AAA Worldwide (AAA), starting from the September 2 episode of NXT. On Night 2 of Gold Rush on November 25, the championship match went over the five-minute mark for the first time. Ava then ordered the match to continue into a one-fall sudden death to crown the new champion.

The title was unified with the NXT Women's North American Championship at Heatwave on August 30, 2026. At the event, which was the first time the Women's Speed title was contested in a triple threat match and forwent its time limit rule, NXT Women's North American Champion Zaria defeated reigning Women's Speed Champion Wren Sinclair and Kali Armstrong in a Winner Takes All match to unify the titles. The Women's Speed Championship was immediately retired with Sinclair recognized as the final champion. The men's Speed Championship was subsequently retired on the following episode of NXT. Although Sinclair was recognized as the final champion, on that subsequent episode of NXT, general manager Robert Stone allowed Zaria to choose which title she wanted to keep and she chose the North American. According to a report, both the men's and women's Speed titles were not retired sooner as WWE had hoped that another deal with X could have been made to relaunch the Speed program.

== Tournaments ==
=== Summary ===
Won title by defeating the reigning champion
Won vacant title
Failed to win title

No.	Tournament winner	No.	Championship match			
No.	Tournament winner	No.	Opponent	Event	Filming date	Broadcast date
1	Candice LeRae	1	Iyo Sky	Speed	October 4, 2024	October 9, 2024
2	Natalya	1	Candice LeRae (c)	Speed	January 3, 2025	January 8, 2025
3	Zoey Stark	1	Candice LeRae (c)	Speed	February 21, 2025	February 26, 2025
4	Sol Ruca	1	Candice LeRae (c)	Speed	April 11, 2025	April 16, 2025
5	Ivy Nile	1	Sol Ruca (c)	Speed	May 23, 2025	May 28, 2025
6	Alba Fyre	1	Sol Ruca (c)	Speed	July 8, 2025	July 9, 2025
7	Jaida Parker (Note: Jaida Parker replaced Lainey Reid, the original tournament winner, who suffered an injury during training and did not win the tournament herself.)	—	Sol Ruca (c)	No Mercy	September 27, 2025	
8	Fallon Henley	1	Zaria	Gold Rush	November 18, 2025	November 25, 2025
9	Wren Sinclair	1	Fallon Henley (c)	NXT	March 17, 2026	
10	Arianna Grace	1	Wren Sinclair (c)	The Great American Bash	June 28, 2026	
(c) – denotes the defending champion

=== Inaugural tournament ===
The participants for the inaugural WWE Women's Speed Championship Tournament were revealed on August 23, 2024.

Quarterfinals; Speed; August 23 – September 13, 2024 (Aired: September 4–18)
Raw	Lyra Valkyria	2:18
Raw	Iyo Sky	Pinfall
SmackDown	Blair Davenport	2:36
SmackDown	Naomi	Submission
SmackDown	Elektra Lopez	2:33
Raw	Kairi Sane	Pinfall
SmackDown	Candice LeRae	Pinfall
SmackDown	Piper Niven	2:37

Semifinals; Speed; September 27 – October 4, 2024 (Aired: October 2–5)
Raw	Iyo Sky	Pinfall
SmackDown	Naomi	2:38
Raw	Kairi Sane	2:28
SmackDown	Candice LeRae	Pinfall

Final; Speed; October 4, 2024 (Aired: October 9)
Raw	Iyo Sky	3:48
SmackDown	Candice LeRae	Pinfall

=== WWE Women's Speed Championship Tournament (November 4–25, 2025) ===
This tournament was held to determine the new WWE Women's Speed Champion after champion Sol Ruca relinquished the title on the October 28, 2025, episode of NXT. The tournament began on the November 4 episode of NXT and is scheduled to conclude at NXT Gold Rush on November 25. WWE LFG season 2 winner Dani Sekelsky, under the ring name Skylar Raye, made her NXT in-ring debut in this tournament.

=== No. 1 contender's tournaments ===
Tournament brackets

1 November 27, 2024 – January 8, 2025

1st Round; Speed; November 22 – December 6, 2024 (Aired: November 27 – December 11)
Raw	Zelina Vega	Pinfall
SmackDown	Chelsea Green	2:05
Raw	Natalya	Submission
SmackDown	B-Fab	2:59
Raw	Katana Chance	Pinfall
Raw	Alba Fyre	2:26
SmackDown	Michin	Pinfall
Raw	Ivy Nile	2:39

Semifinals; Speed; December 13–16, 2024 (Aired: December 18–27)
SmackDown	B-Fab (Note: B-Fab replaced the injured Zelina Vega in the semifinals.)	2:39
Raw	Natalya	Pinfall
Raw	Katana Chance	2:10
SmackDown	Michin	Pinfall

Final; Speed; December 27, 2024 (Aired: January 1, 2025)
Raw	Natalya	Pinfall
SmackDown	Michin	2:14

Championship match Speed; January 3, 2025 (Aired: January 8)
SmackDown	Candice LeRae (c)	Broadway
Raw	Natalya	Broadway

2 February 5–26, 2025

1st Round; Speed; January 31 – February 7, 2025 (Aired: February 5–12)
Raw	Kayden Carter	2:24
Raw	Zoey Stark	Pinfall
NXT	Shotzi	Pinfall
Raw	Isla Dawn (Note: Alba Fyre was replaced by Isla Dawn.)	2:41

Final; Speed; February 14, 2025 (Aired: February 19)
Raw	Zoey Stark	Pinfall
NXT	Shotzi	2:36

Championship match Speed; February 21, 2025 (Aired: February 26)
SmackDown	Candice LeRae (c)	Broadway
Raw	Zoey Stark	Broadway

3 March 26 – April 16, 2025

1st Round; Speed; March 3–10, 2025 (Aired: March 26 – April 2)
NXT	Sol Ruca	Pinfall
SmackDown	Katana Chance	2:31
Raw	Shayna Baszler	2:13
SmackDown	Michin	Pinfall

Final; Speed; April 4, 2025 (Aired: April 9)
NXT	Sol Ruca	Pinfall
SmackDown	Michin	2:38

Championship match Speed; April 11, 2025 (Aired: April 16)
SmackDown	Candice LeRae (c)	4:01
NXT	Sol Ruca	Pinfall

4 May 9–28, 2025

1st Round; Speed; May 2–12, 2025 (Aired: May 9–14)
NXT	Kelani Jordan	Pinfall
NXT	Wren Sinclair	2:43
Raw	Maxxine Dupri	2:59
Raw	Ivy Nile	Pinfall

Final; Speed; May 16, 2025 (Aired: May 21)
NXT	Kelani Jordan	Pinfall
Raw	Ivy Nile	2:53

Championship match Speed; May 23, 2025 (Aired: May 28)
NXT	Sol Ruca (c)	Pinfall
Raw	Ivy Nile	4:55

5 June 25 – July 9, 2025

1st Round; Speed; June 20, 2025 (Aired: June 25–27)
SmackDown	B-Fab	2:32
SmackDown	Alba Fyre	Pinfall
NXT	Thea Hail	Pinfall
Evolve	Nikkita Lyons	2:41

Final; Speed; June 30, 2025 (Aired: July 2)
SmackDown	Alba Fyre	Pinfall
NXT	Thea Hail	2:23

Championship match Speed; July 8, 2025 (Aired: July 9)
NXT	Sol Ruca (c)	Pinfall
SmackDown	Alba Fyre	4:12

6 September 2–27, 2025

1st Round; NXT; September 2–9, 2025
SmackDown	Candice LeRae	Pinfall
TNA	Xia Brookside	2:36
AAA	Faby Apache	2:41
NXT	Lainey Reid	Pinfall

Semifinals; NXT; September 23, 2025
SmackDown	Candice LeRae	2:24
NXT	Lainey Reid	Pinfall

Championship match No Mercy; September 27, 2025
NXT	Sol Ruca (c)	Pinfall
NXT	Jaida Parker (Note: Jaida Parker replaced the injured Lainey Reid.)	4:48

7 February 24 – March 17, 2026

1st Round; NXT; February 24 – March 3, 2026
NXT	Thea Hail	Pinfall
NXT	Blake Monroe	1:07
NXT	Wren Sinclair	Submission
Evolve	Nikkita Lyons	2:56

Final; NXT; March 10, 2026
NXT	Thea Hail	2:55
NXT	Wren Sinclair	Submission

Championship match NXT; March 17, 2026
NXT	Fallon Henley (c)	3:39
NXT	Wren Sinclair	Submission

8 June 16–28, 2026

1st Round; NXT; June 16, 2026
NXT	Arianna Grace	Pinfall
Evolve	Layla Diggs	2:46
NXT	Izzi Dame	Pinfall
NXT	Thea Hail	2:20

Final; NXT; June 23, 2026
NXT	Arianna Grace	Pinfall
NXT	Izzi Dame	2:19

Championship match The Great American Bash; June 28, 2026
NXT	Wren Sinclair (c)	Submission
NXT	Arianna Grace	4:45

== Reigns ==
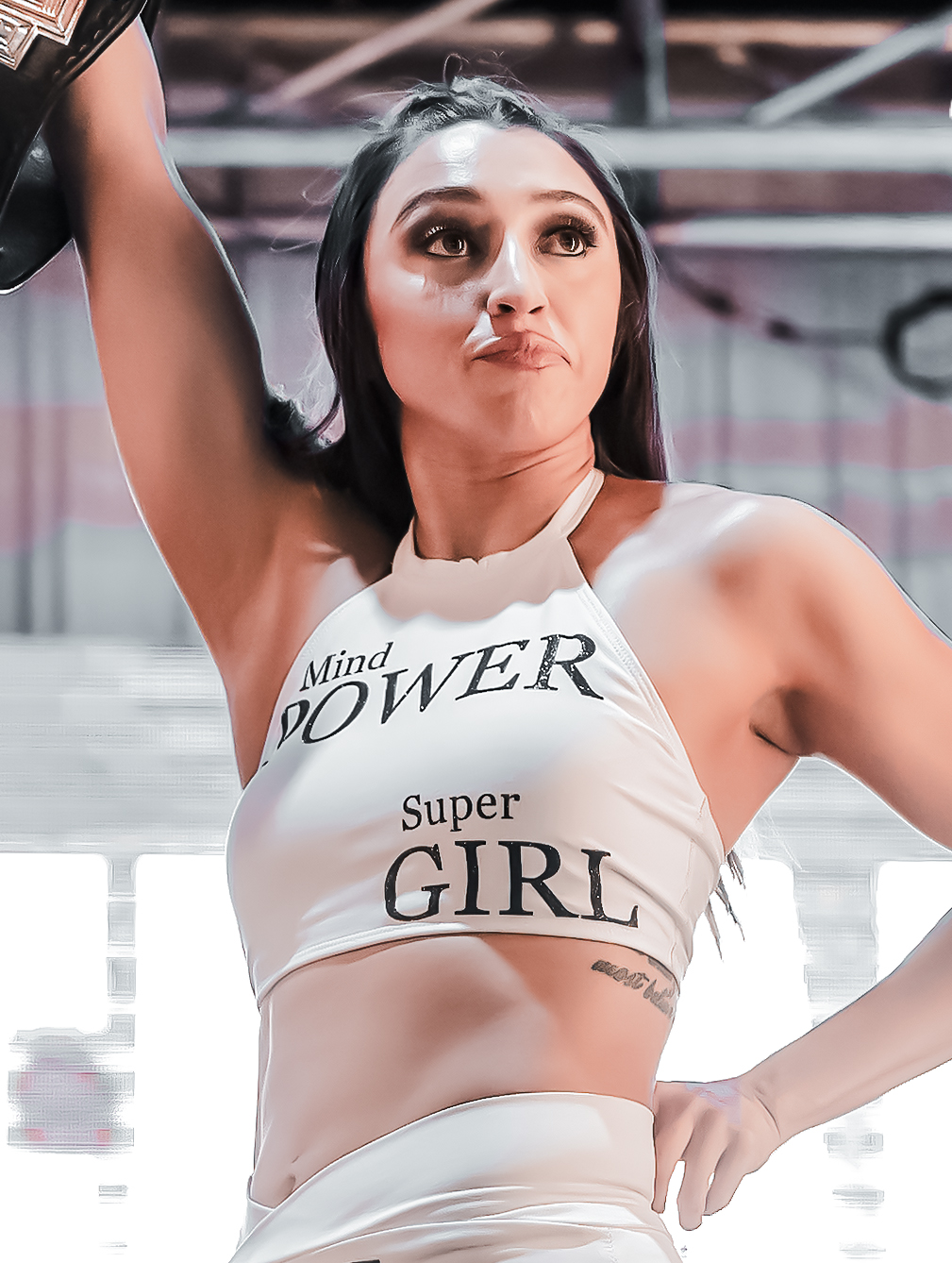
Final champion Wren Sinclair

Over the title's two-year history, there were four reigns among four champions and one vacancy. The inaugural champion was Candice LeRae. Sol Ruca had the longest reign at 200 days, while Fallon Henley had the shortest reign at 119 days (195 days and 112 days, respectively, as recognized by WWE due to tape delay). LeRae was the oldest champion at 39 years old, while Ruca was the youngest at 25 years old. The final recognized champion was Wren Sinclair.

Key
No.	Overall reign number
Reign	Reign number for the specific champion
Days	Number of days held
Days recog.	Number of days held recognized by the promotion

No.	Champion	Championship change			Reign statistics			Notes	Ref.
No.	Champion	Date	Event	Location	Reign	Days	Days recog.	Notes	Ref.
WWE: Raw, SmackDown, and NXT
1	Candice LeRae	October 4, 2024	Speed	Nashville, TN	1	189	188	Defeated Iyo Sky in a tournament final to become the inaugural champion. WWE recognizes LeRae's reign as beginning on October 9, 2024, and ending on April 16, 2025, when the episodes aired on tape delay.	
2	Sol Ruca	April 11, 2025	Speed	Seattle, WA	1	200	195	WWE recognizes Ruca's reign as beginning on April 16, 2025, when the episode aired on tape delay. On August 24 at Heatwave, NXT General Manager Ava announced that the championship would be defended on the NXT brand going forward, but still open to challengers from WWE's other brands, including Evolve and WWE ID, as well as wrestlers from partner promotion Total Nonstop Action Wrestling and sister promotion Lucha Libre AAA Worldwide.	
WWE: NXT
—	Vacated	October 28, 2025	NXT	Orlando, FL	—	—	—	Sol Ruca vacated the title after suffering a knee injury.	
3	Fallon Henley	November 18, 2025	NXT: Gold Rush; Night 2	New York, NY	1	119	112	Defeated Zaria in a tournament final to win the vacant title. This match went over the 5-minute time limit, but NXT General Manager Ava ordered the match to continue into sudden death. WWE recognizes Henley's reign as beginning on November 25, 2025, when the episode aired on tape delay.	
4	Wren Sinclair	March 17, 2026	NXT	Houston, TX	1	166	165		
—	Unified	August 30, 2026	Heatwave	Edinburg, TX	—	—	—	The title was unified with the NXT Women's North American Championship in a Winner Takes All triple threat match also featuring Kali Armstrong. Women's North American Champion Zaria won the match, which forwent the Speed title's time limit rule. The Women's Speed Championship was retired with Wren Sinclair recognized as the final champion.	

== See also ==
- List of former championships in WWE
