= Aigle Blanc =

French professional wrestler

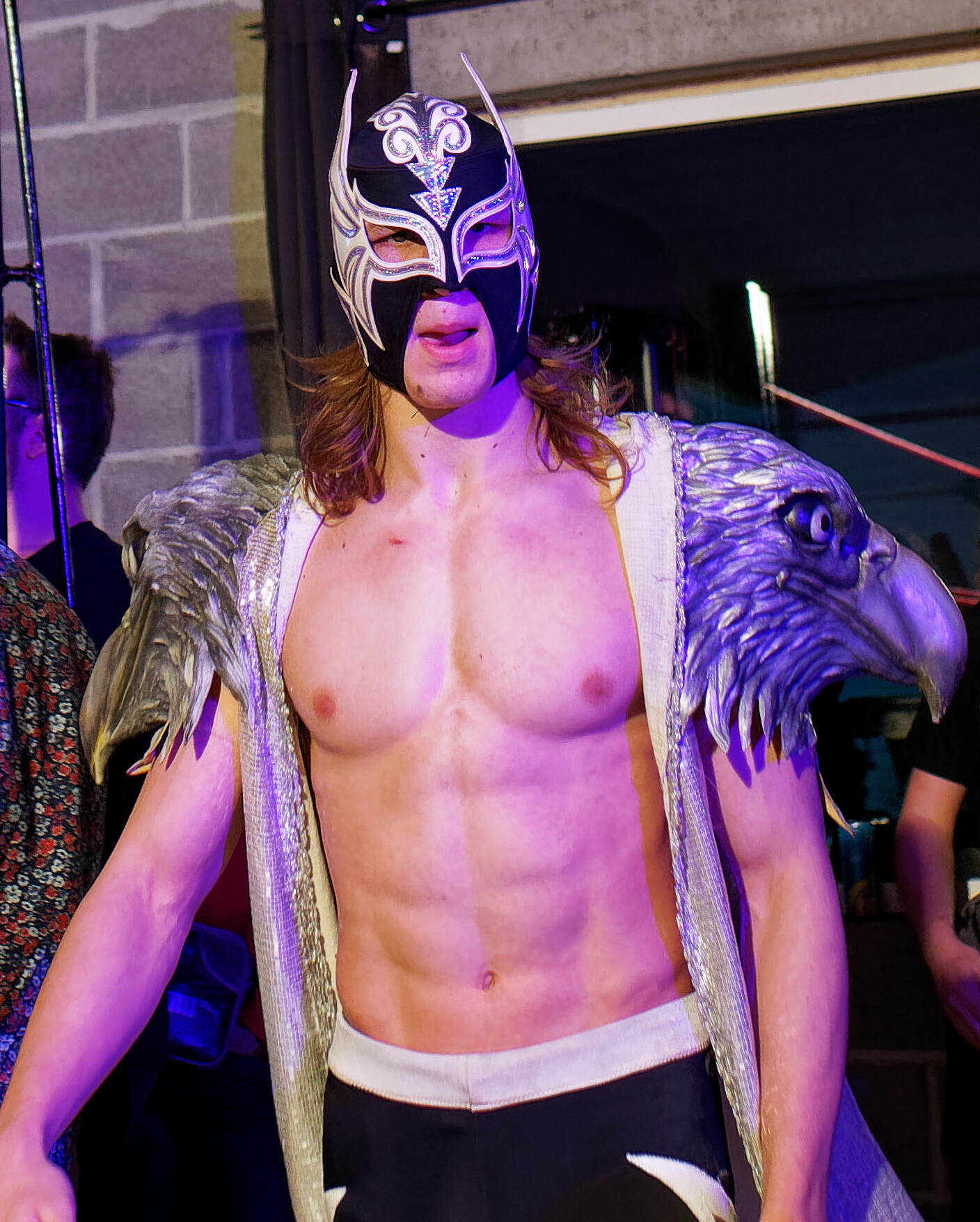
- Blanc in 2020

Personal information
- Born: Cyril Coquerelle; February 19, 1999 (age 27) Paris, France

Professional wrestling career
- Ring name(s): Yama-C; White Eagle; Aigle Blanc; Elio LeFleur
- Billed height: 180 cm (5 ft 11 in)
- Billed weight: 187 lb (85 kg)
- Trained by: Fabio Costantino; Hellmer Lo Guennec; Dick Riviere; Harlem
- Debut: 2014

Cyril Coquerelle (born February 19, 1999) is a French professional wrestler. He is signed to WWE where he performs on the NXT brand under the ring name Elio LeFleur. He is a former one-time WWE Speed Champion.

Coquerelle is primarily known for his work as the masked wrestler Aigle Blanc (French for White Eagle) on the European independent circuit. In the German professional wrestling promotion Westside Xtreme Wrestling (wXw), he is a former one-time wXw World Tag Team Champion and former one-times wXw European Champion.

== Professional wrestling career ==
=== Independent circuit (2014–2025) ===
Aigle Blanc is known for various stints with several promotions in the European independent scene. He made his professional wrestling debut in the Association of Wrestling Professionals (APC) under the ring name of Yama-C at a house show promoted on July 13, 2014, where he defeated Dragon Richard in a singles match. As part of APC's roster, he mostly competed as a developmental talent in other promotions. At Progress x APC, a crossover event promoted alongside Progress Wrestling on August 24, 2019, he lost the APC Championship to Tristan Archer in a three-way match that also featured Chris Brookes. At GCW vs. The World, an event promoted by Game Changer Wrestling on September 23, 2023, he competed in a six-way scramble which was won by Gringo Loco and also involved Arez, Jimmy Lloyd, Mizuki Watase, and The Rotation. At Rixe Episode 17, an event promoted by Rixe Catch on December 16, 2023, he successfully defended the Rixe Championship against Drilla Moloney.

=== Westside Xtreme Wrestling (2020–2025) ===
Aigle Blanc made his Westside Xtreme Wrestling debut at the 2020 edition of the APC/wXw Fight For Paris event, held in conjunction with his home promotion, APC, on January 11 and 12. He defeated Jay Skillet in the quarterfinals, Marius Al-Ani in the semifinals and fell short to David Starr in the finals. He continued with the promotion alongside his "Frenchadors" tag team partner Senza Volto. He began chasing several championships promoted by the company. He won the vacant wXw World Tag Team Championship alongside Senza Volto at on the third night of the 2022 World Tag Team Festival by defeating Amboss (Icarus and Robert Dreissker). At wXw We Love Wrestling: Live in Bad Säckingen on November 4, 2023, he unsuccessfully challenged retaining champion Elijah Blum and Tristan Archer for the wXw Shotgun Championship.

He has competed in several of the promotion's signature events, including Shortcut To The Top, where he made his first appearance at the 2021 edition, competing in the traditional battle royal for the number one contendership to the wXw Unified World Wrestling Championship, which was won by Jurn Simmons and also featured several other notable opponents such as Bobby Gunns, Peter Tihanyi, Norman Harras, Robert Dreissker, Vincent Heisenberg and many others. At the 2022 edition, he competed in the same traditional battle royal won by Levaniel and also involving the likes of Axel Tischer, Hektor Invictus, Laurance Roman, Maggot, Teoman and others.

In the 16 Carat Gold Tournament, Aigle Blanc made his first appearance at the 2022 edition where he lost to Peter Tihanyi in the first round.

=== All Japan Pro Wrestling (2023) ===
In the summer of 2023, Aigle Blanc went on an excursion to Japan to compete for All Japan Pro Wrestling (AJPW) for about a month. He made his debut on the first night of the 2023 Summer Action Series, on July 16, where he teamed up with Satoshi Kojima to defeat Black Menso-re and Yoshitatsu. On the second night of the 2023 Ōdō Tournament on August 21, he teamed up with Zennichi Shin Jidai (Rising Hayato and Yuma Anzai) in a losing effort against Hokuto Omori, Naoki Tanizaki, and Naruki Doi in a six-man tag team match.

=== WWE and AAA (2025–present) ===
In March 2025, Coquerelle participated in a tryout for WWE and reportedly signed a deal with the company and WWE announced the signing of Coquerelle on October 24. He made his televised WWE debut under the new ring name of Elio Lefleur at a Lucha Libre AAA Worldwide Alianzas event on November 28, 2025. Lefleur had his first NXT match against Ethan Page for the NXT North American Championship, but was defeated by Page. Lefleur won the Speed Championship on the February 24, 2026 episode of NXT in a triple threat match against the champion Jasper Troy and Eli Knight. Lefleur relinquished the title on March 31 after suffering a shoulder injury, ending his reign at 34 days while marking his reign as the shortest in the title's history.

== Championships and accomplishments ==
- Pro Wrestling Illustrated
  - Ranked No. 145 of the top 500 singles wrestlers in the PWI 500 in 2024
- Westside Xtreme Wrestling
  - wXw European Championship (1 time, inaugural)
  - wXw World Tag Team Championship (1 time) – with Senza Volto
  - World Tag Team Festival (2022) – with Senza Volto
- WWE
  - WWE Speed Championship (1 time)
