= EK Prosper =

American professional wrestler

Personal information
- Born: Eli Knight; August 15, 2001 (age 25) Orlando, Florida, U.S.

Professional wrestling career
- Ring name(s): Eli Knight; EK Prosper
- Billed height: 6 ft 1 in (1.85 m)
- Billed weight: 202 lb (92 kg)
- Billed from: Orlando, Florida, United States
- Trained by: Ace Steel; Booker T The Foundation of Professional Wrestling; Pro Wrestling 2.0; Reality of Wrestling; WWE Performance Center
- Debut: 2018

Eli Knight (Note: Not to be confused with Eli Drake/LA Knight.) (born August 15, 2001) is an American professional wrestler. He is signed to WWE, where he performs on the NXT brand under the ring name EK Prosper.

He is a former independent wrestler who competed across multiple U.S. promotions before joining WWE's Independent Development (ID) program in 2025 and signing a full developmental contract in 2026.

== Professional wrestling career ==
=== Early career (2018–2025) ===
Knight debuted in 2018 and competed extensively on the American independent wrestling circuit. He appeared for promotions such as Reality of Wrestling (ROW), ACTION Wrestling, Game Changer Wrestling (GCW), Limitless Wrestling, and others.

During his independent run, Knight achieved notable success in tag team competition. He became a one-time ACTION Tag Team Champion and a two-time Reality of Wrestling Tag Team Champion alongside Malik Bosede.

=== WWE (2025–present) ===
In October 2025, Knight was announced as one of WWE's newest Independent Development (ID) prospects. The program allowed select independent wrestlers to train at WWE facilities while continuing to work outside promotions and appear on the Evolve brand. Knight made appearances on WWE programming while still part of the ID program, including a match against Tavion Heights on the December 23, 2025 episode of NXT in a Speed Championship #1 Contendership Tournament, gaining in-ring exposure on WWE television.

On January 13, 2026, WWE officially announced that Knight had signed a full developmental contract and was moved to the NXT brand. On the February 17 episode of NXT, Knight faced Elio Lefleur in a Speed Championship #1 Contender tournament final which ended in a draw for the first time in the tournament's history. Interim NXT General Manager Robert Stone then announced that Speed Champion Jasper Troy will defend the title in a triple threat match. On the following week, Lefleur won the triple threat match to become the new Speed Champion. On the March 31 episode of NXT, Knight was announced as a participant in the 10-person mixed tag team match at the NXT Stand & Deliver countdown show. His ring name was subsequently changed to EK Prosper, possibly to avoid confusion with LA Knight. On the August 18 episode of NXT, Prosper defeated Tristan Angels, Romeo Moreno and La Parka in a number one contender’s Fatal Four-way match for the AAA World Cruiserweight Championship. He would challenge the champion Rey Fénix for the title the following week in a losing effort. On the 8 September episode of NXT, Prosper teamed up with Cruz Montana and Keanu Carver to take on Saquon Shugars, Mason Rook and Tony D'Angelo in a Six Man Tag Team Match to qualify for the NXT Championship No. 1 contender's Triple Threat match the following week, which Prosper’s team lost. On the September 29 episode of NXT, Prosper accepted an open challenge by NXT Champion Grayson Waller for the title, replacing Waller’s original opponent Mason Rook who was not medically cleared to compete. He failed to win the title from Waller.

== Championships and accomplishments ==
- ACTION Wrestling
  - ACTION Tag Team Championship (1 time) – with Malik Bosede
- Pro Wrestling Illustrated
  - Ranked No. 206 of the top singles wrestlers in the PWI 500 in 2026
- Reality of Wrestling
  - ROW Tag Team Championship (2 times) – with Malik Bosede
  - ROW Glory Championship (1 time)
