= WWE Speed =

Professional wrestling streaming television program

- Genre: Professional wrestling Sports entertainment
- Created by: Paul "Triple H" Levesque
- Opening theme: "Conquered It All" by def rebel
- Country of origin: United States
- Original language: English
- No. of episodes: 83

Production
- Executive producers: Paul "Triple H" Levesque; Lee Fitting
- Camera setup: Multi-camera setup
- Running time: 3–5 minutes
- Production company: WWE

Original release
- Network: X
- Release: April 3, 2024 – July 9, 2025

Related
- WWE Evolve; WWE Superstars; WWE Main Event; WWE Raw; WWE SmackDown; WWE NXT

WWE Speed, or simply Speed, is an American professional wrestling web series that was produced by WWE. The series featured wrestlers from WWE's Raw, SmackDown, and NXT brands competing in matches with a three-minute (five-minute in championship matches) time limit.

The show premiered as part of what was reported to be a two-year deal with X Corp., with new matches posted exclusively to WWE's X account on Wednesdays. The men's WWE Speed Championship and the WWE Women's Speed Championship were contested in matches with an extended five-minute time limit with these matches typically uploaded on Fridays. Matches for Speed were generally taped prior to live broadcasts of WWE's weekly television programs, Raw and SmackDown. As per a condition of the contract with X, the Speed championships were originally exclusive to Speed and did not initially appear on WWE's other programs.

Speed produced 83 episodes from April 3, 2024, to July 9, 2025, after which, the series was quietly cancelled. In August 2025, it was announced that the Speed championships would become part of the NXT brand moving forward until August 2026, when both Speed championships were retired.

== History ==
Prior to the December 15, 2023, broadcast of the weekly professional wrestling television show WWE SmackDown, the American company WWE filmed pilots for a new concept known as "WWE Speed", under which matches would have a five-minute time limit. The pilots involved members of WWE's NXT roster, including Axiom, Cedric Alexander, Bronson Reed, and Nathan Frazer.

On February 6, 2024, it was reported that WWE had filed trademark applications for the title "WWE Speed"; on February 8 during the WrestleMania XL Kickoff press conference, WWE officially announced a partnership with X Corp. to introduce WWE Speed, which would exclusively stream weekly on the social media platform X. The deal was confirmed for two years. It was also revealed that the matches would be filmed specifically for the program and not repurposed from WWE's other programs, and that it would feature wrestlers from the Raw, SmackDown, and NXT brands.

On March 27, 2024, WWE commentator Corey Graves announced that Speed would premiere on Wednesday, April 3, but matches would instead be three minutes in length. Also announced was a tournament to crown the inaugural men's WWE Speed Champion. The debut episode, which was uploaded at 12:00 p.m. Eastern Time (ET), saw Ricochet defeat Dragon Lee. Roughly 30 minutes later, WWE uploaded a second episode in which Bronson Reed defeated Cedric Alexander. Graves served as the sole commentator for the episodes.

While the program typically aired on Wednesdays, a special Friday airing occurred on May 3, 2024. This episode, which was the seventh episode overall, saw Ricochet defeat Johnny Gargano to become the inaugural Speed Champion. This episode also confirmed that championship matches would air on Fridays and would have a five-minute time limit instead of the regular three (some later championship matches also aired on a Wednesday).

On May 1, 2024, WWE Chief Content Officer Paul "Triple H" Levesque confirmed that the program would also eventually feature women's matches. This led to the announcement of a tournament for the WWE Women's Speed Championship, which began on September 4. During the Speed tapings on October 4, 2024 (aired October 9), Candice LeRae defeated Iyo Sky to become the inaugural Women's Speed Champion.

=== Cancellation ===
Following the July 9, 2025, episode, the future of Speed came into question as the series stopped airing new episodes without explanation. Various news outlets began reporting that the series had been quietly cancelled, but neither WWE or X Corp. made any statements on the show's status. Wrestling journalist Dave Meltzer further clarified that WWE had not taped any episodes after July 9 and his WWE contacts had no knowledge on the program's future. Around the same time, reigning Women's Speed Champion Sol Ruca began appearing on WWE NXT with the title. In an interview on August 19, Ruca said that the Speed Championships previously only appeared on Speed as it was "a separate universe being on X". She was then given permission by WWE to carry the title on NXT's programming.

At NXT Heatwave on August 24, NXT general manager Ava subsequently announced that the Speed championships would become part of the NXT brand going forward (effectively confirming the cancellation of the Speed series), and announced that a tournament would be held on NXT to determine a top contender for the Women's Speed Championship at No Mercy, contested between representatives of NXT and SmackDown, as well as WWE's sister promotion Lucha Libre AAA Worldwide (AAA) and partner promotion Total Nonstop Action Wrestling (TNA).

== On-air personality ==
Commentators	Tenure
Corey Graves	April 3, 2024 – July 9, 2025
