= List of WWE personnel =

WWE is an American entertainment company and professional wrestling promotion based in Stamford, Connecticut. It is owned and operated by TKO Group Holdings, itself a majority owned subsidiary of the WME Group. WWE personnel consists of professional wrestlers, managers, play-by-play and color commentators, ring announcers, interviewers, referees, trainers, producers, script writers, and various other positions. Executives and board members are also listed.

== Overview ==
As of 2024, WWE employs over 800 full-time employees as part of its business operations, spread across its three segments: Media, Live Events, and Consumer Products. In addition, they contract with various other vendors and service providers. As part of its Live Events segment, WWE signs performers known as professional wrestlers; these performers are described by the company as "independent contractors", with contracts for performers typically ranging from short developmental to multi-year deals.

=== Brands ===
Since the reintroduction of the WWE brand extension in 2016, performers are assigned to one of two primary "main roster" brands: Raw and SmackDown. A third brand, NXT, had originally been designated as a developmental brand for the main roster. In 2019, it was elevated to the third main roster brand. In 2021, the brand's weekly television show was rebooted as "NXT 2.0", and was reinstated to its original status as the developmental division for the main roster (Raw and SmackDown), although it has since dropped the "2.0" name. In 2025, WWE introduced a fourth brand, called Evolve, which features WWE wrestlers and independent wrestlers who are just beginning their training at the WWE Performance Center under the WWE Recruit programs, with the goal of advancing to NXT.

Main roster performers primarily appear on Monday Night Raw and Friday Night SmackDown. Advanced developmental wrestlers appear on NXT, while beginning developmental wrestlers appear on Evolve. Supplementary shows include Main Event, which features Raw and SmackDown wrestlers (with occasional appearances from NXT wrestlers), and LFG, which features Evolve wrestlers. Performers may also appear on other WWE weekly television programming, as well as on its Premium Live Events (PLEs) and untelevised house shows. A majority of personnel in its developmental system train at the WWE Performance Center in Orlando, Florida.

=== Championships ===
For the most part, the brands have their own distinct championships, although the WWE Women's Tag Team Championship is open to be held and defended across Raw, SmackDown, and NXT. On September 28, 2026, it was announced that the AAA World Cruiserweight Championship - from Mexican sister promotion Lucha Libre AAA Worldwide (AAA) - would officially be open to all brands under the WWE banner, with the champion able to defend the title on any show. WWE wrestlers holding other championships from AAA, U.S. partner promotion Total Nonstop Action Wrestling (TNA), and Japanese partner promotion Pro Wrestling Noah (NOAH) are also recognized by WWE.

== Main roster ==
=== Raw ===
==== Men's division ====
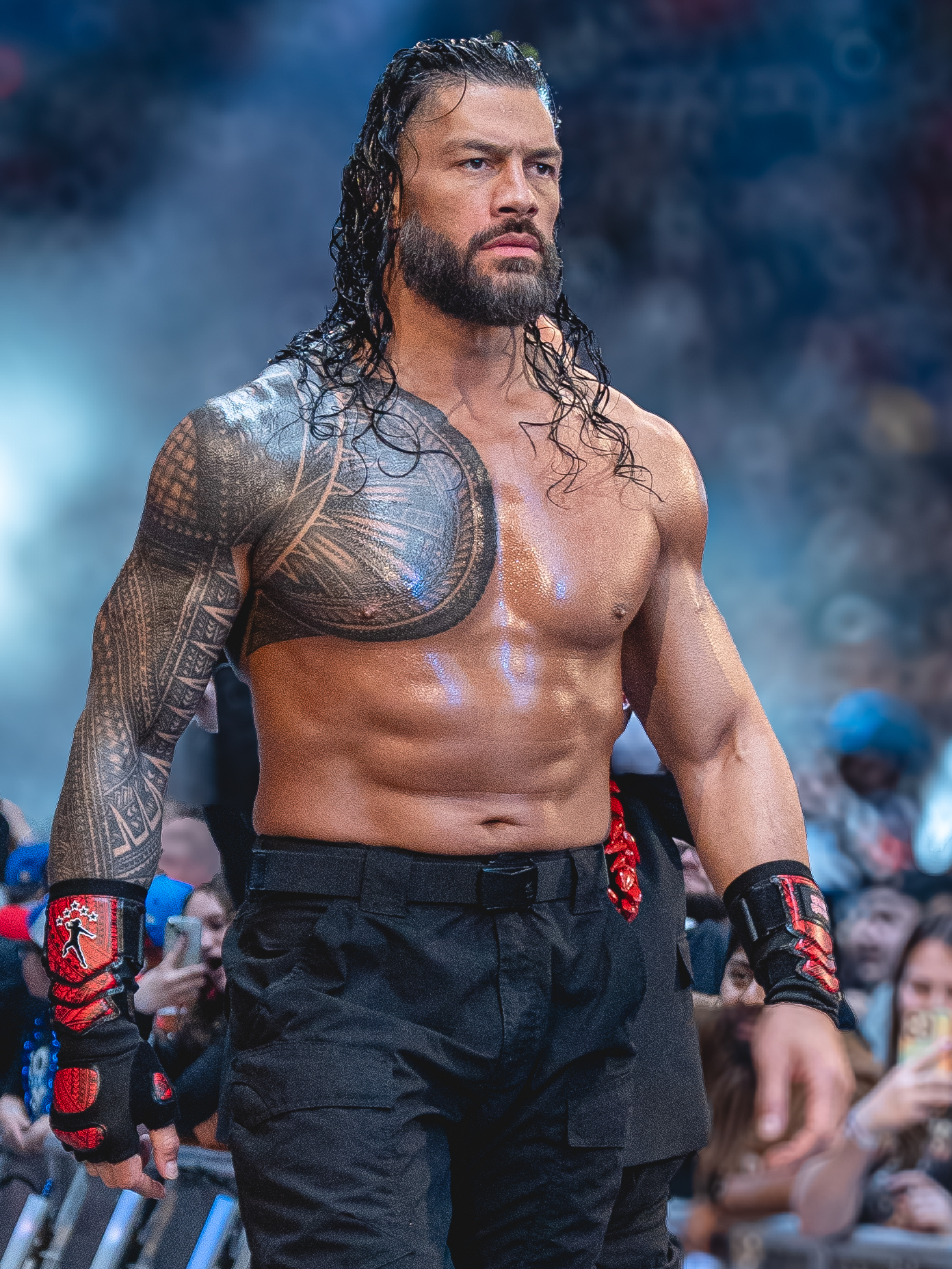
Roman Reigns

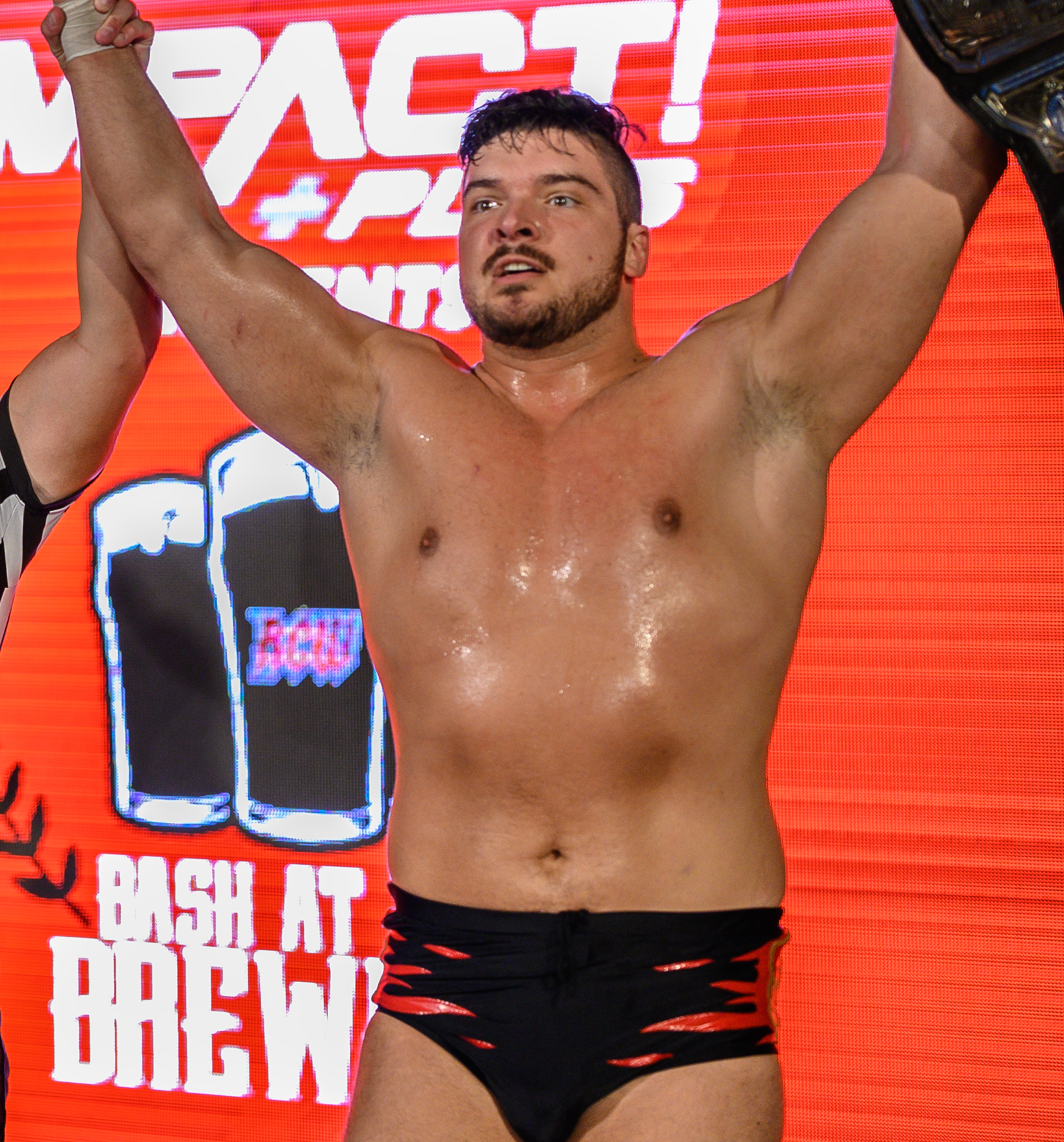
Ethan Page

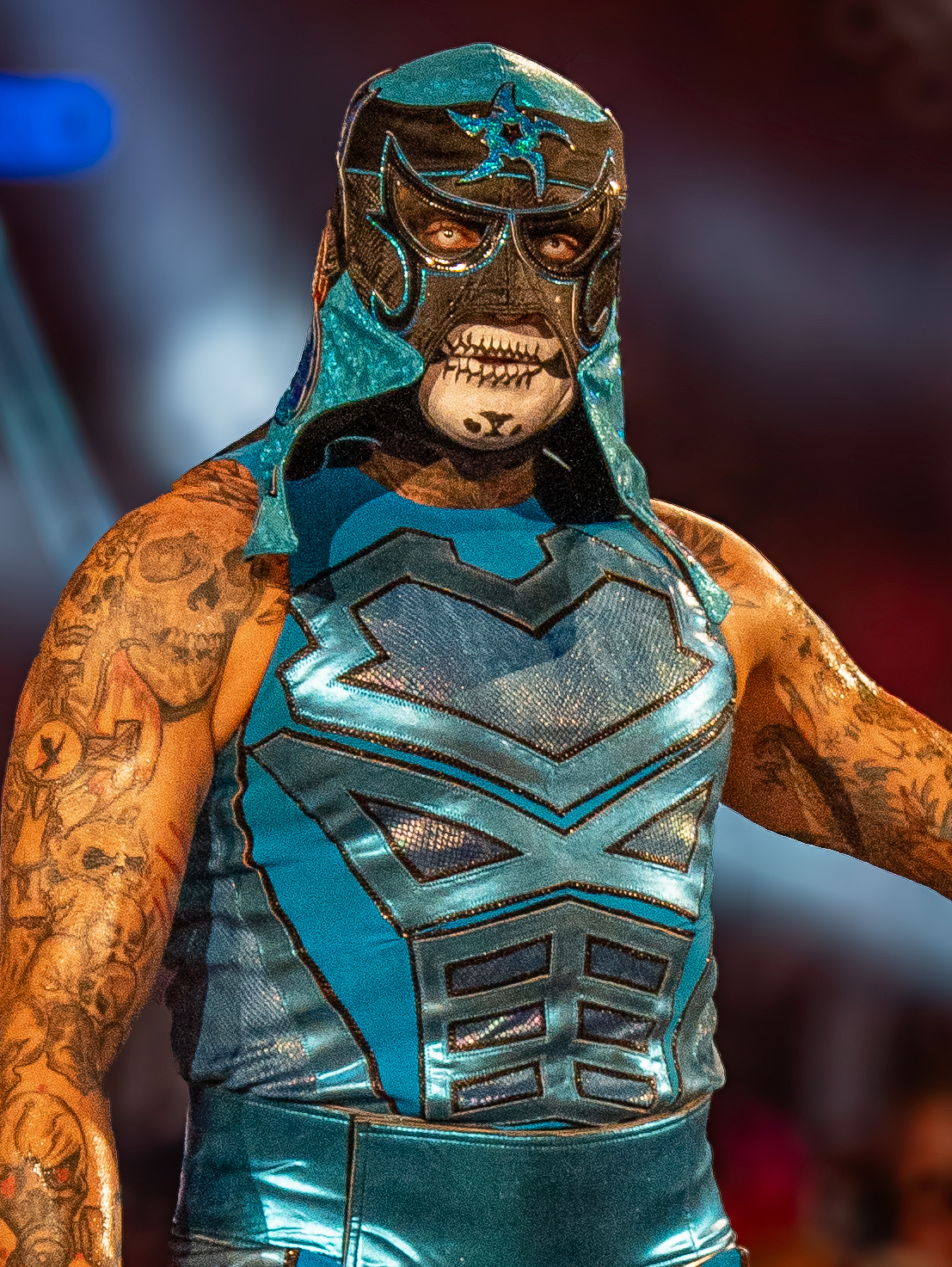
Penta

Je'Von Evans

Ring name	Real name	Notes
Akira Tozawa	Akira Tozawa	
Angelo Dawkins	Gary Gordon	
Austin Theory	Austin White	
Big Cass	William Morrissey	
Bravo Americano	Tyler Bate	
Bron Breakker	Bronson Rechsteiner	
Bronco Nima	Edwin Grande	
Carmelo Hayes	Christian Brigham	
Chad Gable	Charles Betts	
Cruz Del Toro	Raúl Mendoza	
Cruz Montana	Mark Sanchez	
Dominik Mysterio	Dominik Gutiérrez	
Dragon Lee	Emmanuel Muñoz González	
El Grande Americano	Marcel Barthel	AAA Mega Champion
Ethan Page	Julian Micevski	Intercontinental Champion
Jacob Fatu	Jacob Fatu	
JD McDonagh	Jordan Devlin	
Je'Von Evans	Malachi Jeffers	World Tag Team Champion
Jey Uso	Joshua Fatu	
Jimmy Uso	Jonathan Fatu	
Joaquin Wilde	Michael Paris	
Joe Hendry	Joseph Hendry	
LA Knight	Shaun Ricker	
Logan Paul	Logan Paul	
Lucien Price	Nnamdi Oguayo	
Montez Ford	Kenneth Crawford	
Oba Femi	Torioluwa Odugbesan	
Otis	Nikola Bogojević	
Penta	Undisclosed (Note: Per longstanding tradition, the identities of masked lucha libre wrestlers is kept secret from the general public. It is considered taboo for wrestlers, news media, or fans to report or speculate on the identities of masked lucha libre wrestlers.)	World Tag Team Champion; Money in the Bank contract holder
Rayo Americano	Peter England	AAA Producer
Rey Mysterio	Óscar Gutiérrez Rubio	Commentator for Lucha Libre AAA on Fox; Hall of Famer; AAA Hall of Famer
Roman Reigns	Leati Anoa'i	World Heavyweight Champion
Royce Keys	William Hobson	
Rusev	Miroslav Barnyashev	
Seth Rollins	Colby Lopez	
Solo Sikoa	Joseph Fatu	

==== Women's division ====
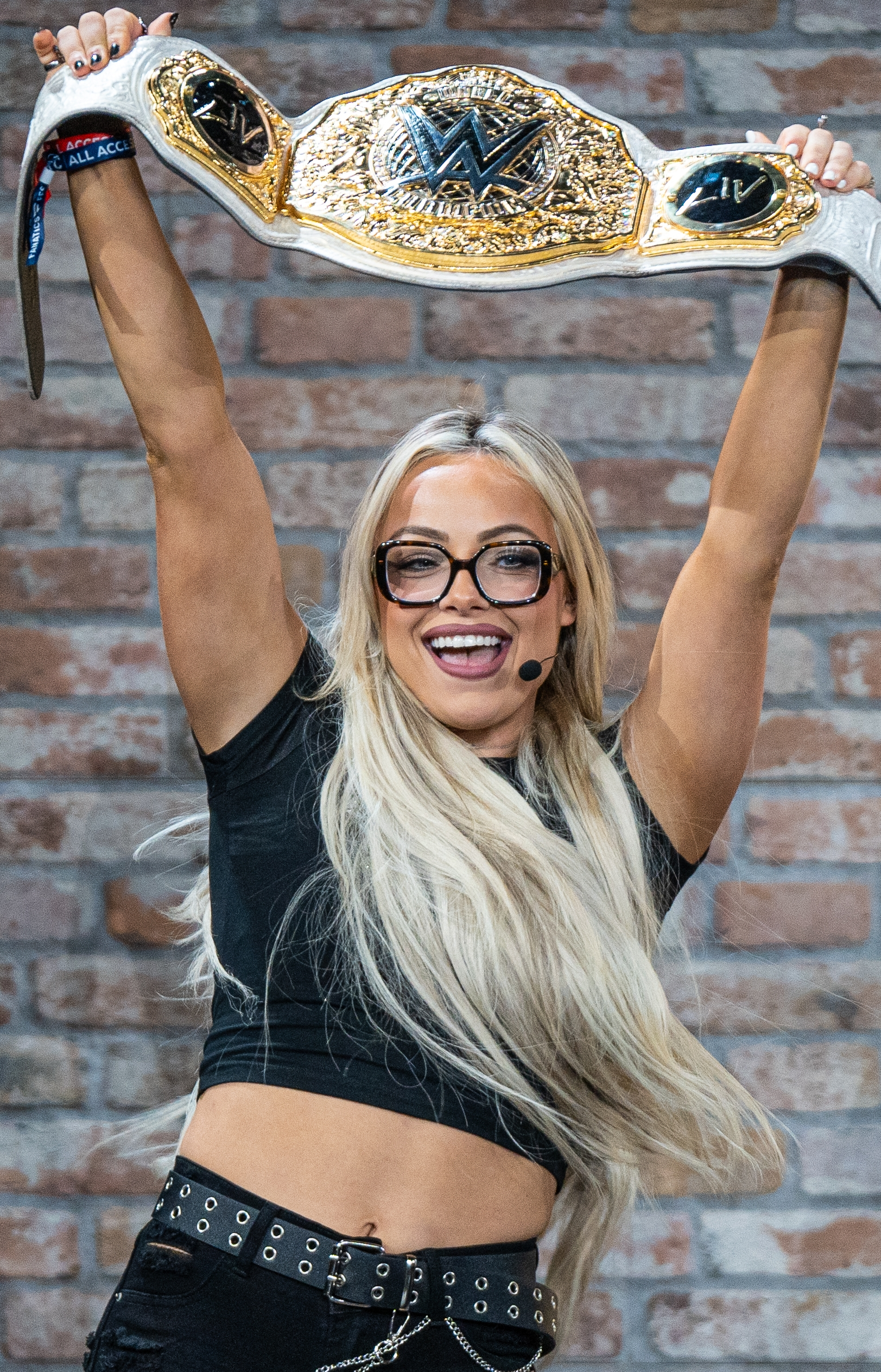
Liv Morgan

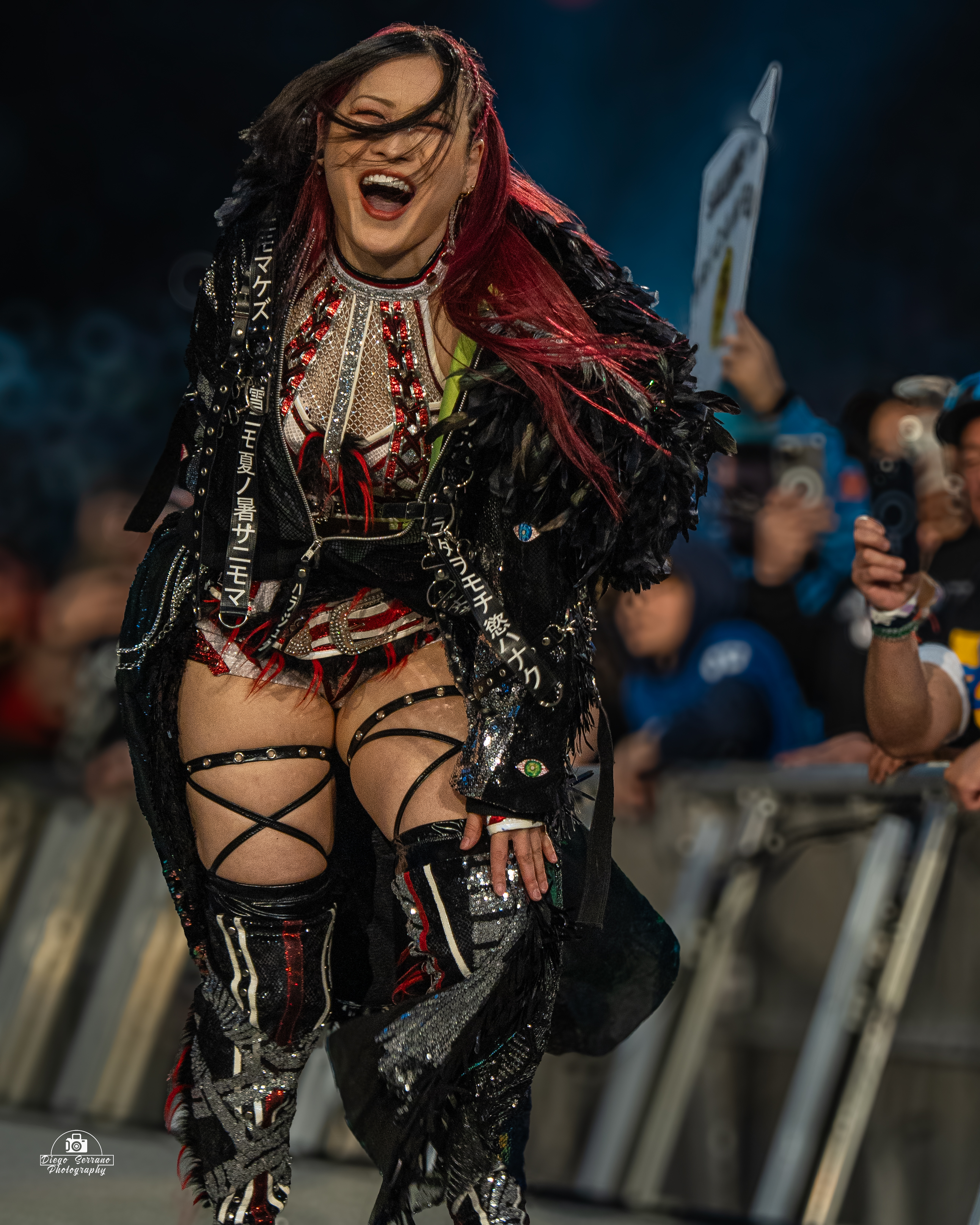
Iyo Sky

Ring name	Real name	Notes
Asuka	Kanako Urai	
Bayley	Pamela Martínez	
Becky Lynch	Rebecca Quin	
Ivy Nile	Emily Andzulis	
Iyo Sky	Masami Odate	Women's Intercontinental Champion
Jaida Parker	Tiana Caffey	
Liv Morgan	Gionna Daddio	Women's World Champion
Lola Vice	Valerie Loureda	
Lyra Valkyria	Aoife Cusack	
Maxxine Dupri	Sydney Luke	
Raquel Rodriguez	Victoria González	
Roxanne Perez	Carla Gonzalez	
Sol Ruca	Calyx Hampton	
Stephanie Vaquer	Ana Vaquer González	

==== Other on-air personnel ====
Ring name	Real name	Notes
Adam Pearce	Adam Pearce	General Manager; Director of Live Events; Producer

=== SmackDown ===
==== Men's division ====
Sami Zayn

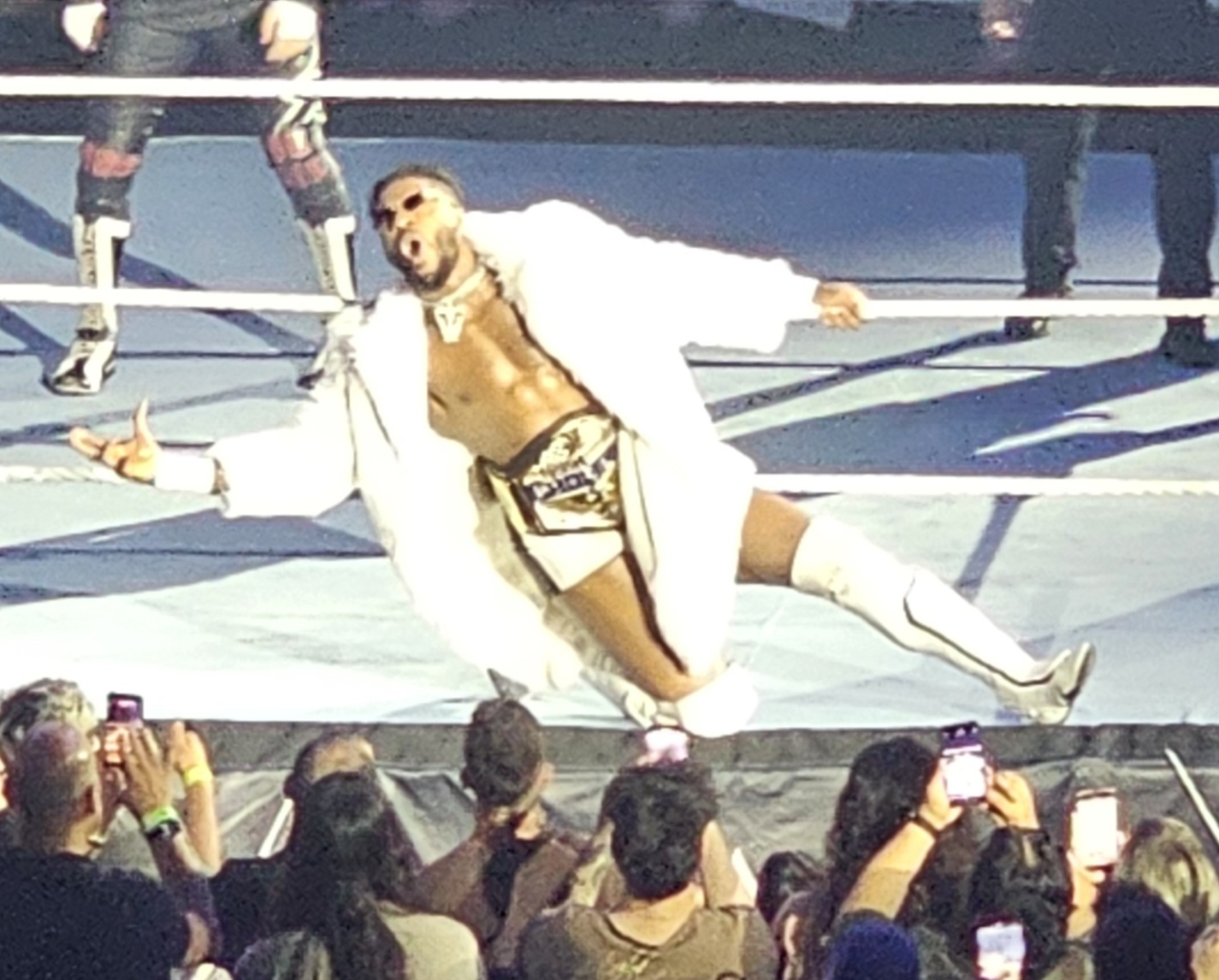
Trick Williams

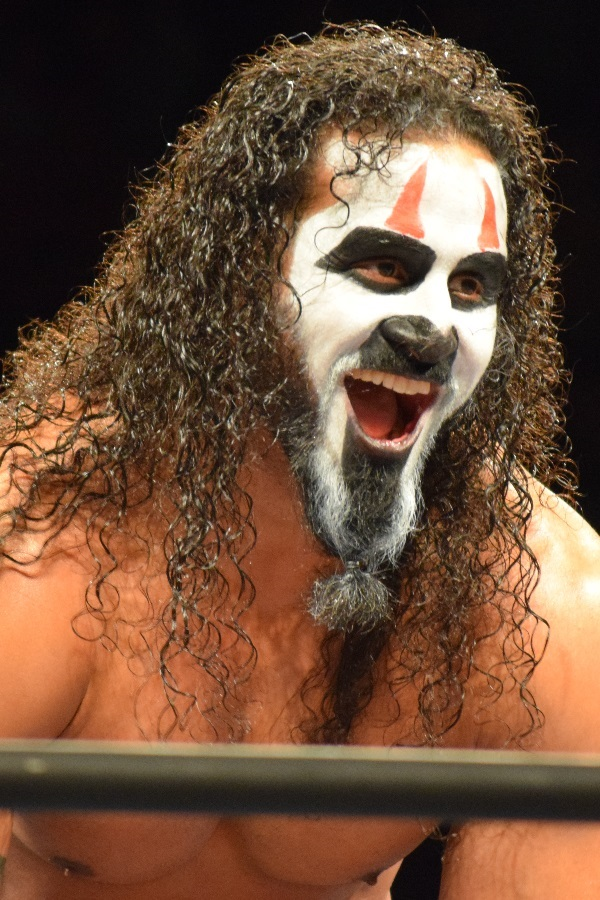
Tama Tonga

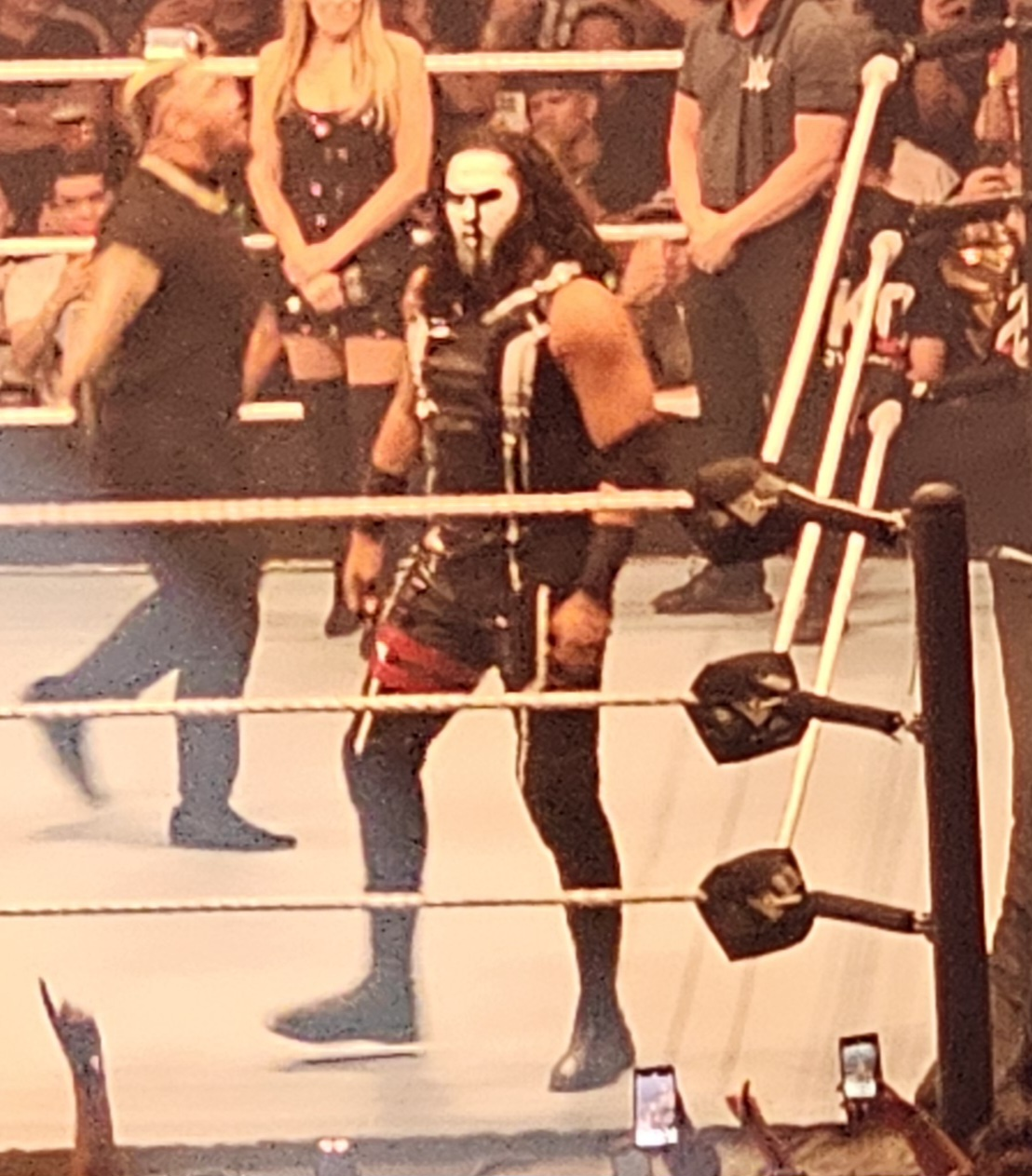
Talla Tonga

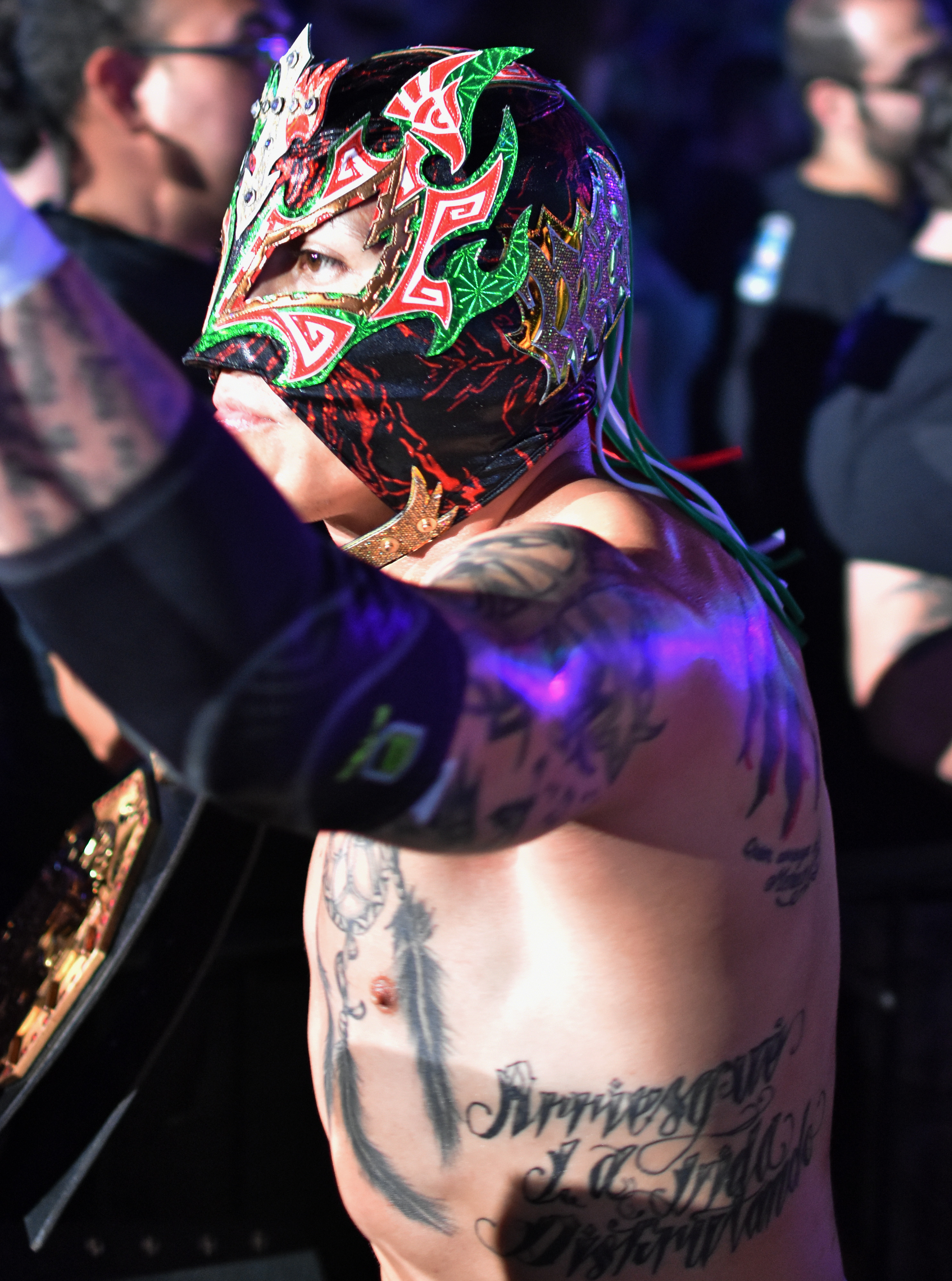
Rey Fénix

Note - The AAA World Cruiserweight Championship is open to all WWE brands, thus the champion can appear on any show regardless of what his home brand may be.

Ring name	Real name	Notes
Angel	Humberto Garza Solano	AAA World Trios Champion
Axiom	Carlos Ruíz	
Baron Corbin	Thomas Pestock	
Berto	Humberto Garza Carrillo	AAA World Trios Champion
CM Punk	Phillip Brooks	
Cody Rhodes	Cody Runnels Rhodes	
Damian Priest	Luis Martínez	
Drew McIntyre	Andrew Galloway IV	
Erik	Raymond Rowe	
Finn Bálor	Fergal Devitt	
Gunther	Walter Hahn	
Ivar	Todd Smith	
Johnny Gargano	John Gargano	
Kevin Owens	Kevin Steen	LFG coach
Kit Wilson	Samuel Stoker	
Kyoki	Hiromu Takahashi	
The Miz	Michael Mizanin	
Nathan Frazer	Benjamin Timms	
R-Truth	Ronnie Killings	
Randy Orton	Randal Orton	
Rey Fénix	Undisclosed	AAA World Cruiserweight Champion
Ricky Saints	Richard Starks	
Sami Zayn	Rami Sebei	Undisputed WWE Champion
Shinsuke Nakamura	Shinsuke Nakamura	
Talla Tonga	Taula Leone Fifita	WWE Tag Team Champion
Tama Tonga	Alipate Aloisio Leone	WWE Tag Team Champion
Trick Williams	Matrick Belton	United States Champion

==== Women's division ====
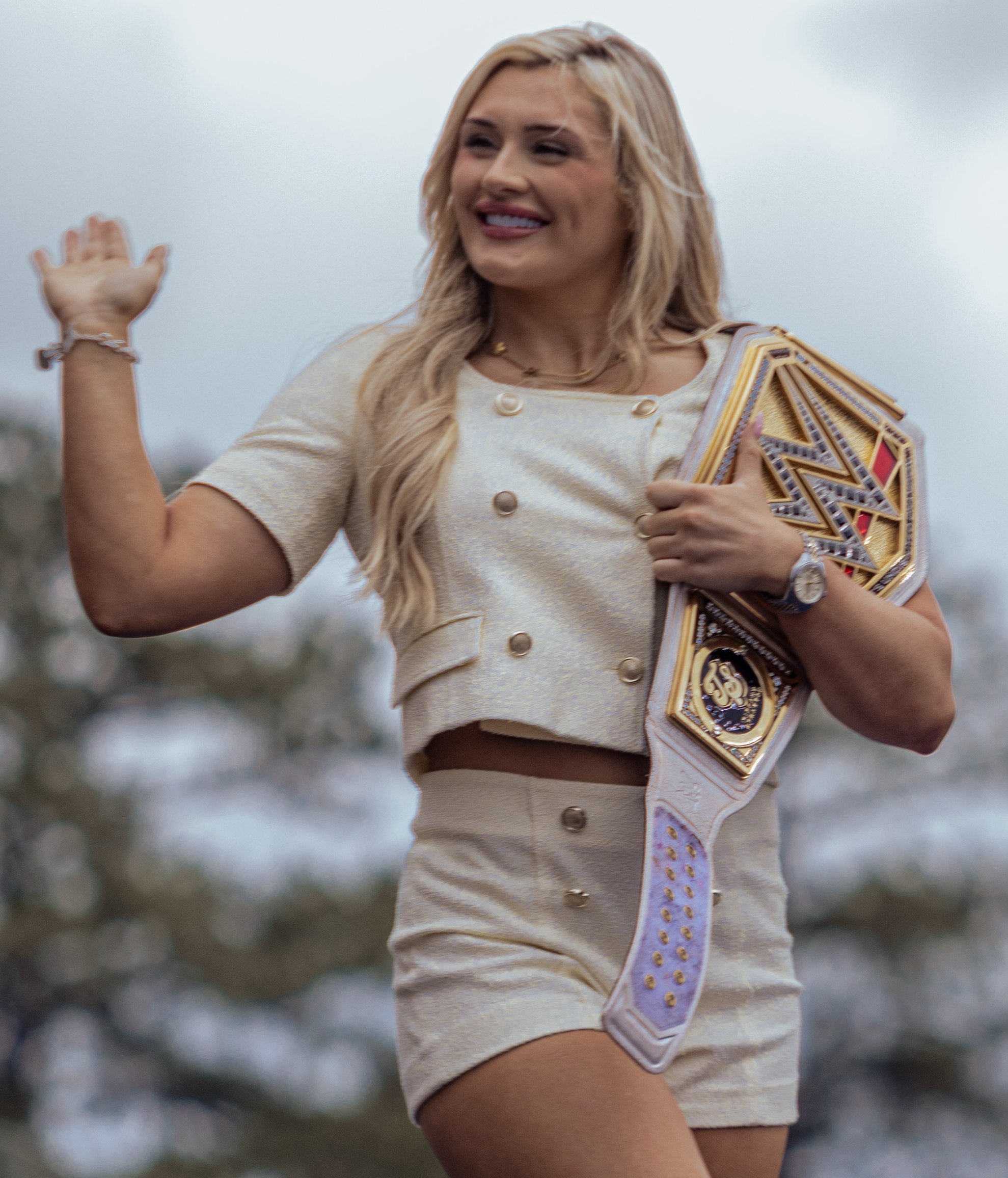
Tiffany Stratton

Jacy Jayne

Michin

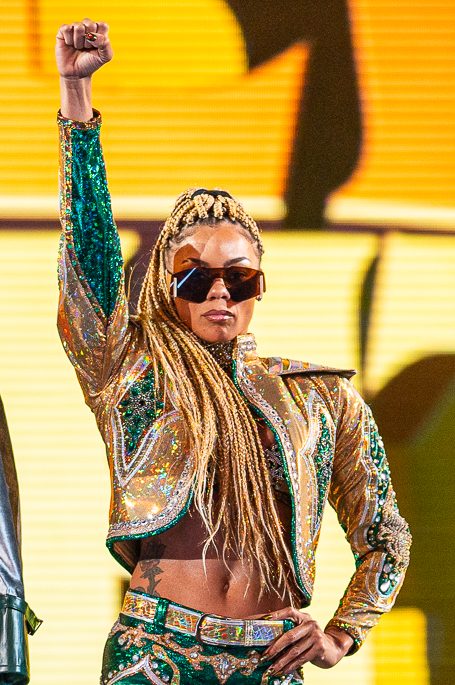
B-Fab

Note - The WWE Women's Tag Team Championship is shared between Raw, SmackDown, and NXT, thus the champions can appear on any brand regardless of what their home brand may be.

Ring name	Real name	Notes
Alexa Bliss	Alexis Cabrera	
B-Fab	Briana Brandy	Women's Tag Team Champion
Blake Monroe	Mariah Mead	
Candice LeRae	Candice LeRae	
Charlotte Flair	Ashley Fliehr	
Chelsea Green	Chelsea Cardona	
Fallon Henley	Theresa Schuessler	
Giulia	Eimi Matsudo	
Jacy Jayne	Taylor Grado	Women's United States Champion
Jade Cargill	Jade Cargill	
Jordynne Grace	Patricia Gresham	
Kiana James	Kayla Klingensmith	
Lainey Reid	Tylynn Register	
Lash Legend	Anriel Belton	
Michin	Stephanie Lee	Women's Tag Team Champion
Nia Jax	Savelina Fanene	
Paige	Saraya-Jade Bevis	
Tatum Paxley	Natalie Beidelschies	
Tiffany Stratton	Jessica Woynilko	WWE Women's Champion

==== Other on-air personnel ====
Ring name	Real name	Notes
Haku	Tonga Fifita	Manager of The MFTs
Lil Yachty	Miles McCollum	Manager of Trick Williams
Nick Aldis	Nicholas Aldis	General Manager; Producer

=== Nonexclusive ===
WWE refers to talent not specifically assigned to a brand as "free agents", who may appear on any show.

==== Men's division ====
Ring name	Real name	Notes
Danhausen	Donovan Danhausen	
Omos	Tolulope Omogbehin	

==== Women's division ====
Ring name	Real name	Notes
AJ Lee	April Mendez	
Nikki Bella	Stephanie Garcia-Colace	Hall of Famer

== Developmental roster ==
=== NXT ===
The NXT brand is for wrestlers in an advanced stage in their training in WWE's developmental system, who are prepping for a potential call up to the main roster. WWE (in particular NXT) has partnerships with U.S. promotion Total Nonstop Action Wrestling (TNA), and the Japan based Pro Wrestling Noah (NOAH). As a result of these partnerships, TNA and NOAH wrestlers periodically appear on NXT programming and vice versa.

==== Men's division ====
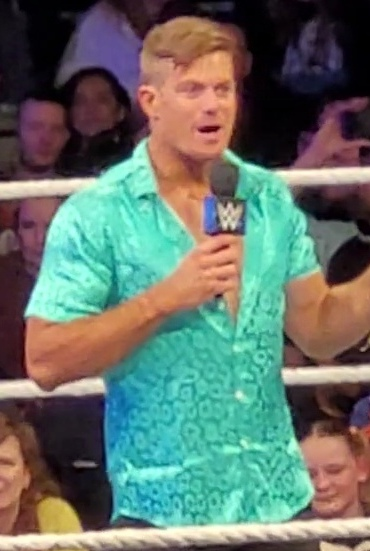
Grayson Waller

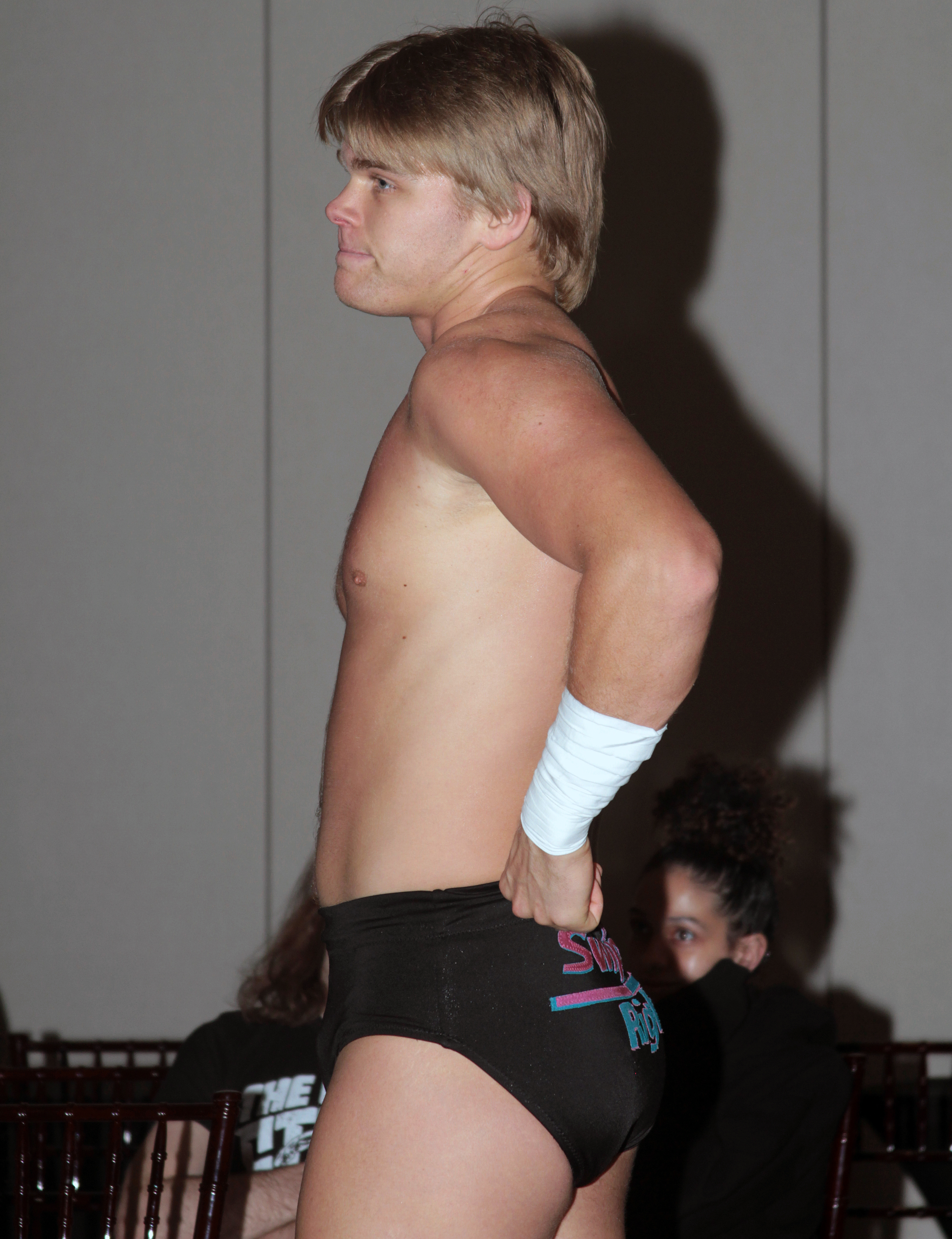
Brad Baylor

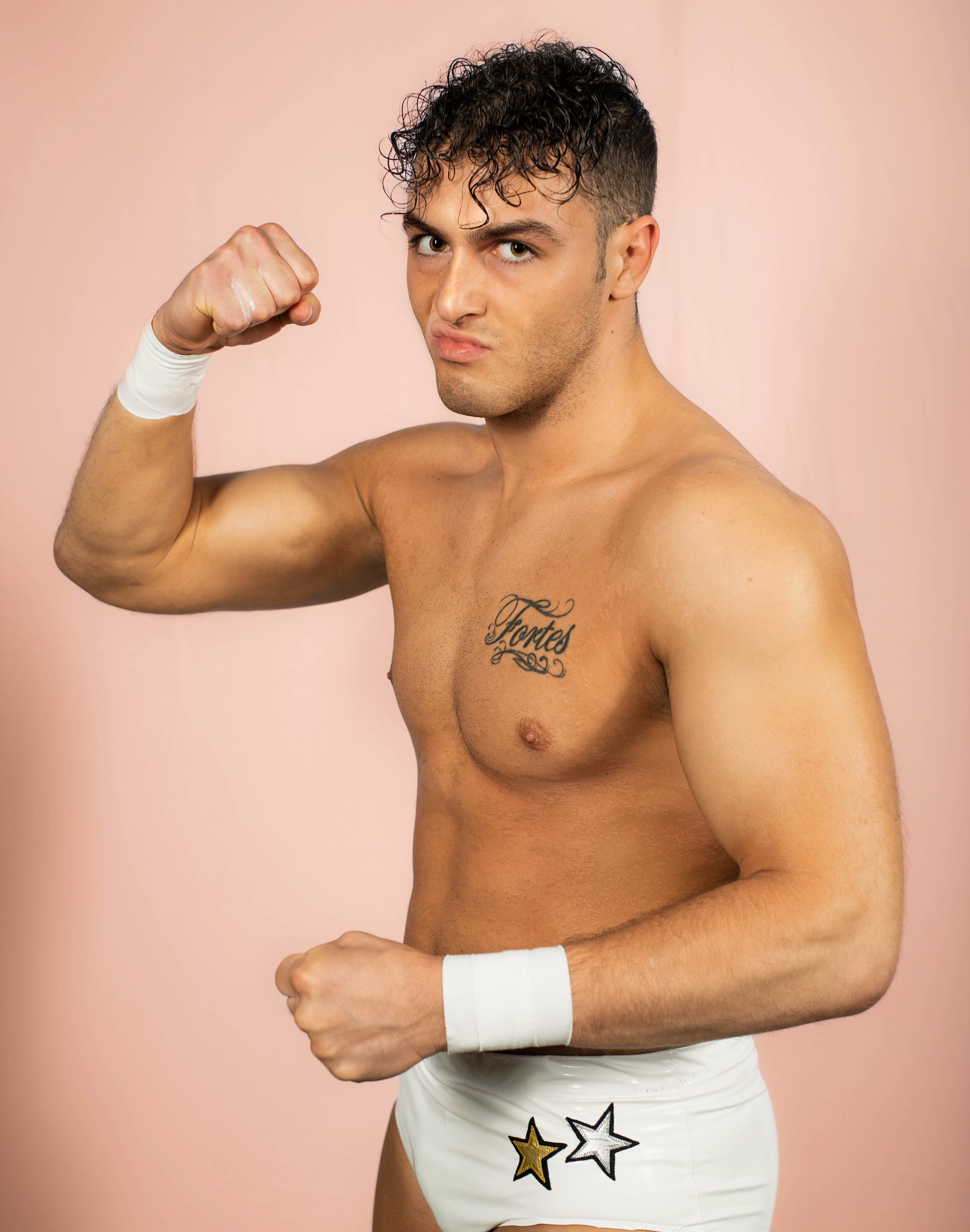
Ricky Smokes

Ring name	Real name	Notes
Brad Baylor	Brad Baylor	NXT Tag Team Champion
Channing "Stacks" Lorenzo	Mitchell LaValley	
Charlie Dempsey	Bailey Matthews	
Cutler James	Jonah Niesenbaum	
Dion Lennox	Andrzej Hughes-Murray	
Dorian Van Dux	Mike Derudder	
EK Prosper	Eli Knight	
Elio LeFleur	Cyril Coquerelle	
Enzo Amore	Eric Arndt	
Grayson Waller	Matthew Farrelly	NXT Champion
Hank Walker	Joseph Sculthorpe	
Jackson Drake	Jackson Drake	North American Champion
Josh Briggs	Joshua Bruns	
Kam Hendrix	Anthony Luke	
Lexis King	Brian Pillman	
Mason Rook	William Walker	
Myles Borne	David Bostian III	
Naraku	Takaaki Watanabe	
Niko Vance	Skylor Clinton	
Noam Dar	Noam Dar	
Osiris Griffin	Joshua Black	
Ricky Smokes	Unknown	NXT Tag Team Champion
Romeo Moreno	Jaime Zozaya-García	
Saquon Shugars	Copeland Barbee	
Sean Legacy	Sean Rossini	
Shawn Spears	Ronnie Arneill	Performance Center Assistant Coach
Shiloh Hill	Thunder Keck	
Tank Ledger	Joseph Spivak	
Tavion Heights	Tracy Hancock	
Tony D'Angelo	Joseph Ariola	
Tristan Angels	Nathan Cranton	
Uriah Connors	Brogan Finlay	
Zilla Fatu	Isayah Fatu	

==== Women's division ====
Ring name	Real name	Notes
Arianna Grace	Bianca Carelli	
Chantel Monroe	Derrian Gobourne	
Izzi Dame	Franki Strefling	
Kali Armstrong	Destinee Brown	
Karmen Petrovic	Monika Klisara	
Kelani Jordan	Lea Mitchell	NXT Women's Champion
Kendal Grey	Peyton Prussin	
Layla Diggs	Breanna Covington	
Lizzy Rain	Rayne Leat	
Myka Lockwood	Bayley Humphrey	
Nattie	Natalie Neidhart-Wilson	LFG coach
Reina Volcan	Nicole Ripoll-Martinez	
Thea Hail	Madison Knisley	
Wren Sinclair	Madison Dombkowski	
Zaria	Daria Hodder	Women's North American Champion

==== Other on-air personnel ====
Ring name	Real name	Notes
Robert Stone	Robert Strauss	General Manager; Producer; Color commentator for Evolve

=== Evolve ===
Evolve serves the brand for wrestlers just beginning their training in WWE's developmental system, featuring former collegiate athletes recruited through the WWE NIL program, and independent wrestlers in promotions serving as developmental territories under the WWE ID program.

==== Men's division ====
Ring name	Real name	Notes
Aaron Rourke	Aaron Rourke	WWE ID prospect
Ahmed Essam	Ahmed Essam	
Brooks Jensen	Benjamin Buchanan	
Chazz "Starboy" Hall	Charlie Hilder	WWE ID prospect
Drake Morreaux	Beau Morris	Also wrestles on Lucha Libre AAA on Fox as "El Carnicero"
Elijah Holyfield	Elijah Holyfield	
Fahd Tuwaiq	Badr Saud Al-Sahli	
Garrett Beck	Garrett Beck	
Harlem Lewis	Vincent Winey	Evolve Men's Champion
Harley Riggins	Chase Kline	
Hidetora Hanada	Hidetora Hanada	
It's Gal	Gal Barkay	WWE ID prospect
Jacari Ball	Jha'Quan Anderson	WWE ID prospect
Jackson Goonrey	Jackson Goonrey	
Jax Presley	Kyle Klink	
Kale Dixon	Caleb Balgaard	
Kato Sykes	Nick Mariano	WWE ID prospect
Marquis Journey	Josiah Jean	WWE ID prospect
Max Abrams	Mike Cunningham	ID Champion; WWE ID prospect
Milosh Jovic	Dušan Novaković	
Nicholas Panicali	Nicholas Panicali	
Richard Adonis	Richard Adonis	WWE ID prospect
Shido Ash	Shady Elnahas	
Tate Wilder	Case Hatch	
Tyran Tuckey	Tyran Tuckey	
Ulka Sasaki	Yuta Sasaki	On excursion from NOAH
Viktor Zanov	Aaron Fara	
Yayne Harrison	Yanic Brouillette	WWE ID prospect

==== Women's division ====
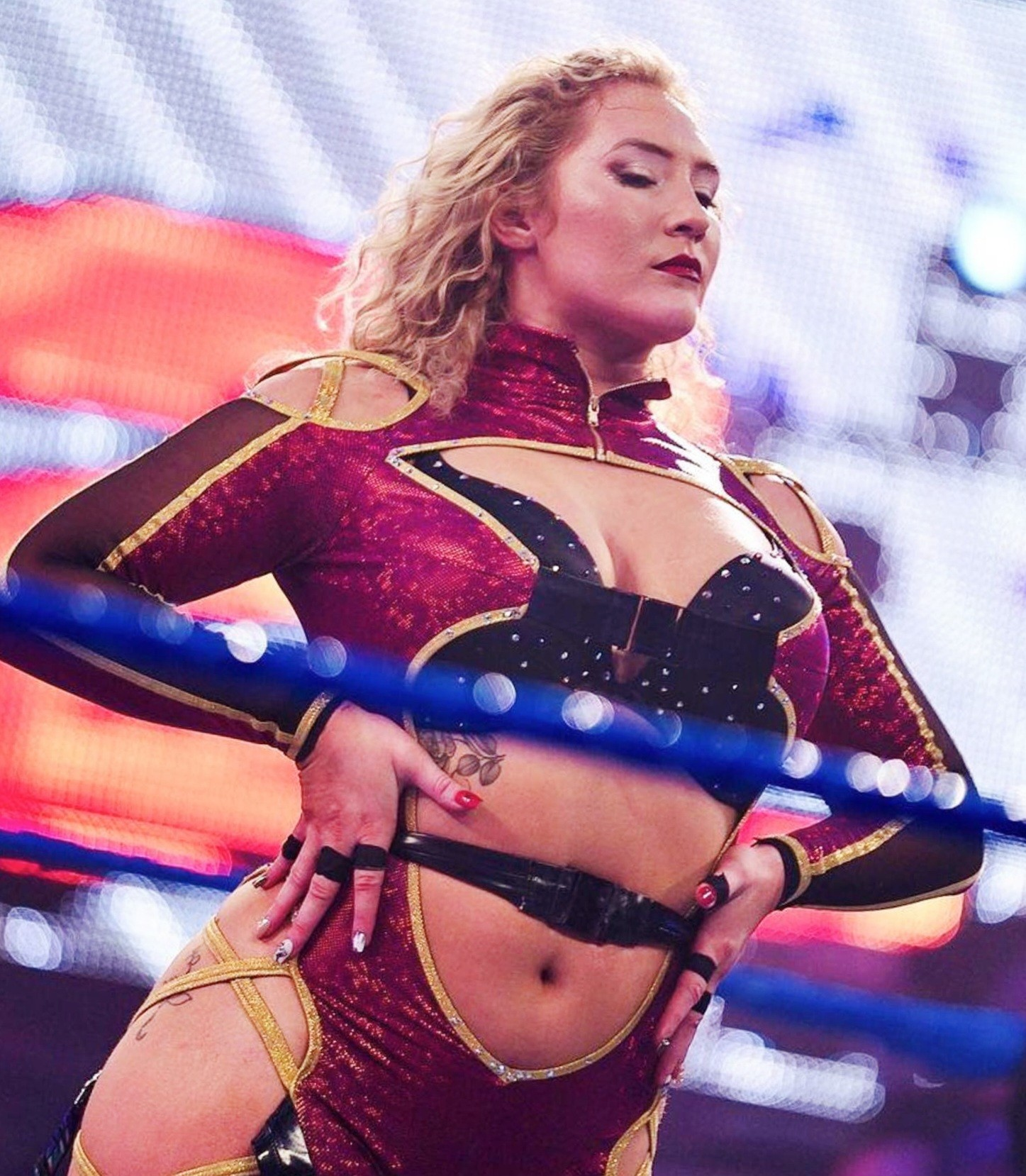
Nikkita Lyons

Ring name	Real name	Notes
Aalyah Gutiérrez	Aalyah Gutiérrez	
Alix Brooks	Meghan Walker	
Alyssa Daniele	Alyssa Daniele	
Ana da Silva	Ana da Silva	
Andi Summers	Zoe Sager	
Cara Brown	Cara Brown	
Delia Schweizer	Delia Schweizer	
Elly Finch	Elly Finch	
Gabriela Martinez Asensi	Gabriela Martinez Anensi	
Gianna Capri	Noelle Giorgi	WWE ID prospect
Kenzie	Marie Malenko	
Monica Monroe	Unknown	Women's ID Champion; WWE ID prospect
Nikkita Lyons	Faith Jefferies	Evolve Women's Champion
Silvia Likki	Silvia Likki	
Skylar Raye	Dani Sekelsky	
Sloane Jacobs	Amelia Herr	WWE ID prospect
Tayleigh Robertson	Tayleigh Robertson	
Vanta the Unknown	Jessica Bogdanov	
Zoe Hines	Zoe Hines	

==== Other on-air personnel ====
Ring name	Real name	Notes
Timothy Thatcher	Timothy Moura	General Manager ("Foreman"); Producer; WWE Performance Center Assistant Coach; WWE ID coach

== PUP list ==
WWE has established a PUP (physically unable to perform) list for wrestlers who are out with a legitimate injury and thus are not able to wrestle. The list documents talents of both the main and developmental rosters.

Free Agent
Ring name	Real name	Reason	Notes
Brie Bella	Brianna Danielson	Broken scapula	Hall of Famer
Raw
Ring name	Real name	Reason	Notes
Bronson Reed	Jermaine Haley	Broken ribs	
Naomi	Trinity Fatu	Maternity leave	
SmackDown
Ring name	Real name	Reason	Notes
Bianca Belair	Bianca Crawford	Maternity leave Boxer's fracture	
Elton Prince	Lewis Howley	Neck injury	
Matt Cardona	Matthew Cardona	Torn triceps	
Piper Niven	Kimberly Benson	Cervical stenosis	
Rhea Ripley	Demiti Bennett	Torn meniscus	

== Referees ==
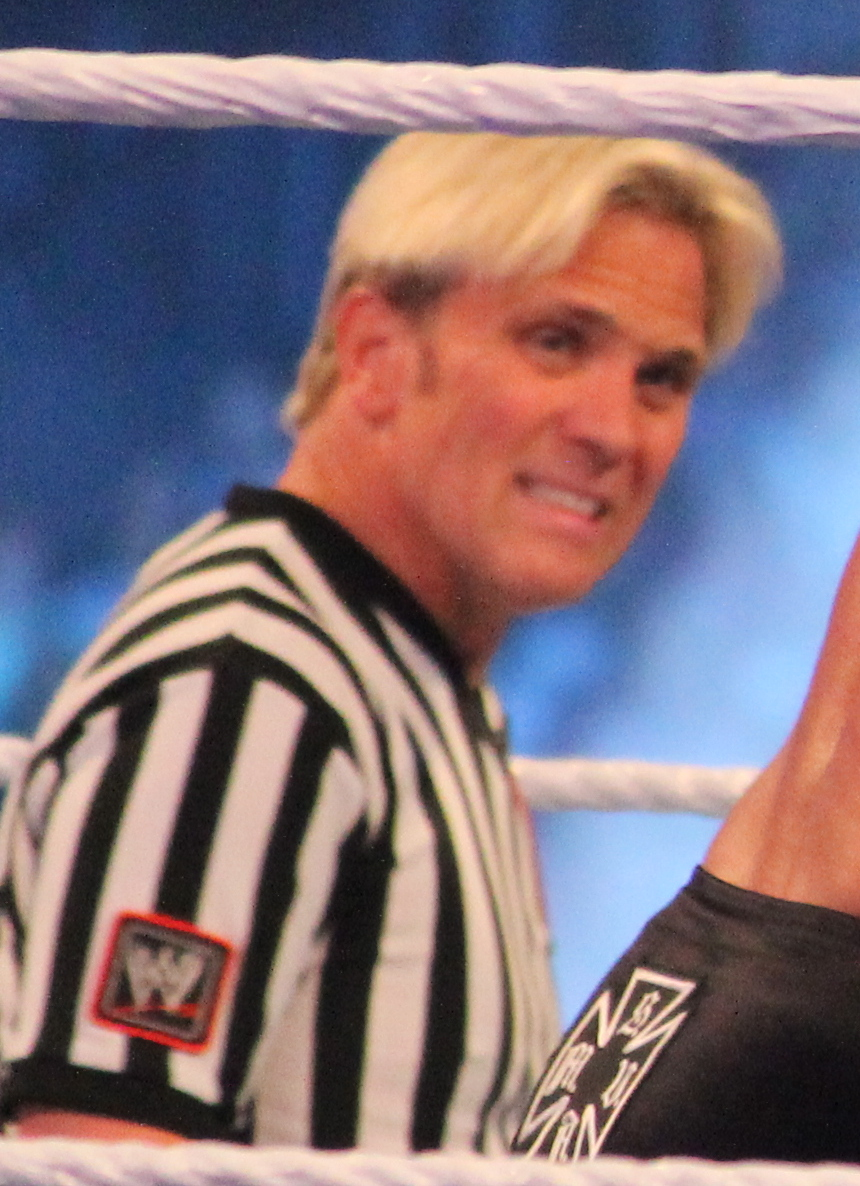
Charles Robinson

Name	Real name	Brand	Notes
Adrian Butler	Darryl Sharma	NXT/SmackDown	Senior referee: NXT; AAA Producer
Chad Patton	Chad Patton	Raw	Senior referee: Raw
Charles Robinson	Charles Robinson	SmackDown	Senior referee: SmackDown; Ring crew stagehand
Chip Danning	Christopher Sharpe	NXT	
Dallas Irvin	Antrone Brewer	NXT	
Dan Engler	Daniel Engler	SmackDown	
Danilo Anfibio	Danilo Anfibio	Raw	
Daphanie LaShaunn	Aja Smith	SmackDown	
Derek Sanders	Thomas Castor	NXT	
Eddie Orengo	Eddie Orengo	Raw	
Felix Fernandez	Sammy Carrion	NXT	
Jason Ayers	Jason Ayers	SmackDown	
Jessika Carr	Jessika Heiser	Raw	
Jeremy Marcus	Jeremy Marcus	NXT	
Joey Gonzalez	Unknown	NXT	
John Cone	John Cone	Raw	Vice President of Talent Relations
Katie Reynolds	Katie Reynolds	NXT	
Rod Zapata	Robert Vista	Raw	
Ryan Tran	Brian Nguyen	SmackDown	
Shawn Bennett	Matthew Bennett	Raw	
Victoria D'Errico	Victoria D'Errico	Evolve/NXT/SmackDown	

== Broadcast team ==
=== Raw ===
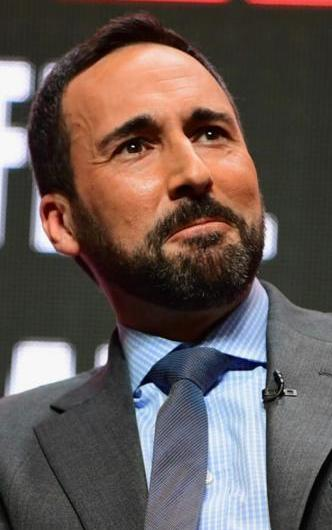
Joe Tessitore

Name	Real name	Notes
Alicia Taylor	Alicia Warrington	Ring announcer Host of LFG
Byron Saxton	Bryan Kelly	Backstage interviewer
Jackie Redmond	Jackie Redmond	Backstage interviewer Pre-show co-host for PLEs
Joe Tessitore	Joseph Tessitore	Play-by-play commentator Post-show host for PLEs
Wade Barrett	Stuart Bennett	Color commentator Commentator for PLEs

=== SmackDown ===
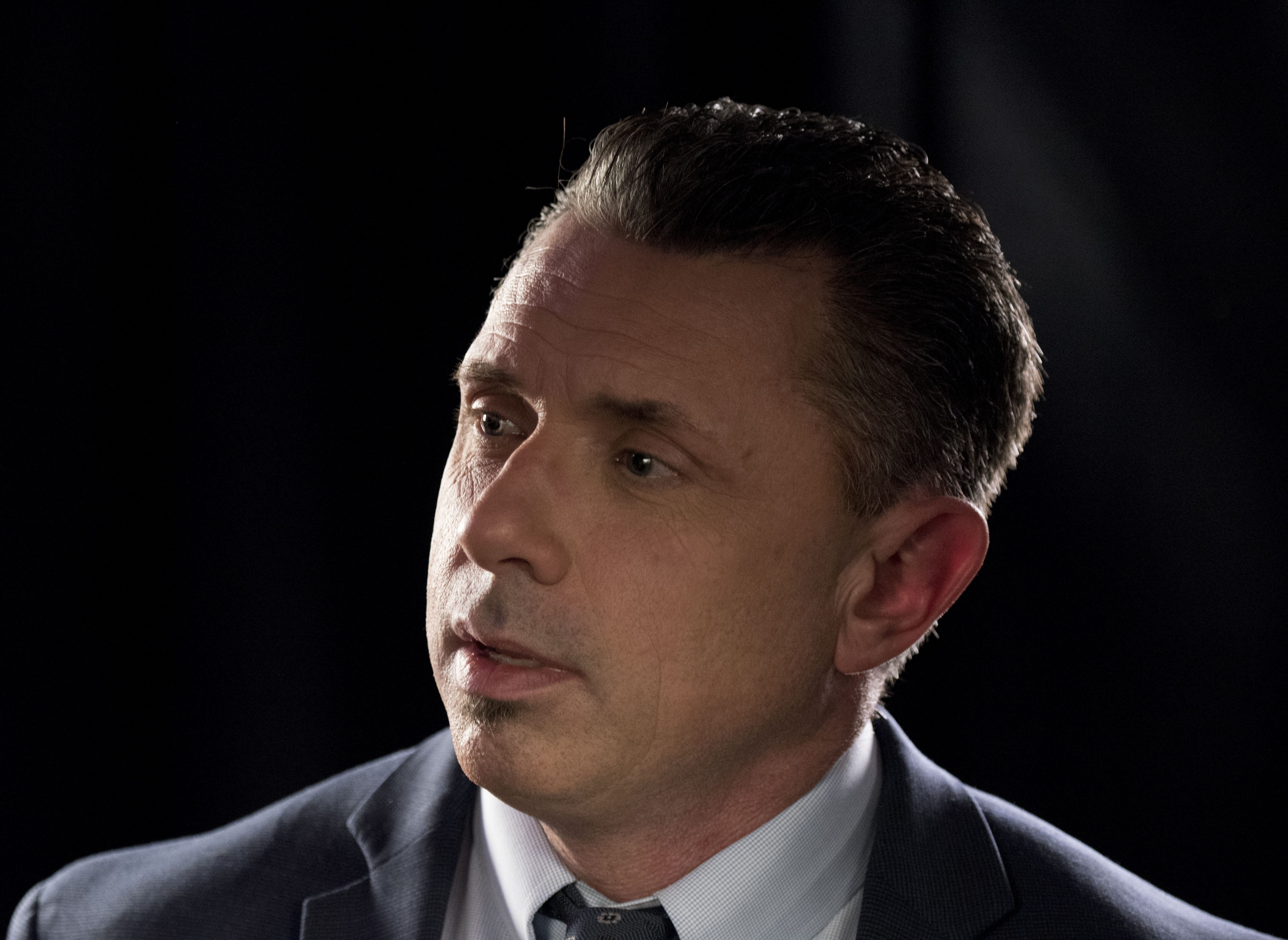
Michael Cole

Name	Real name	Notes
Cathy Kelley	Catherine Kelley	Backstage interviewer
Corey Graves	Matthew Polinsky	Color commentator Commentator for Lucha Libre AAA on Fox
Mark Nash	Mark Shunock	Ring announcer
Michael Cole	Sean Coulthard	Play-by-play commentator Commentator for PLEs

=== NXT ===
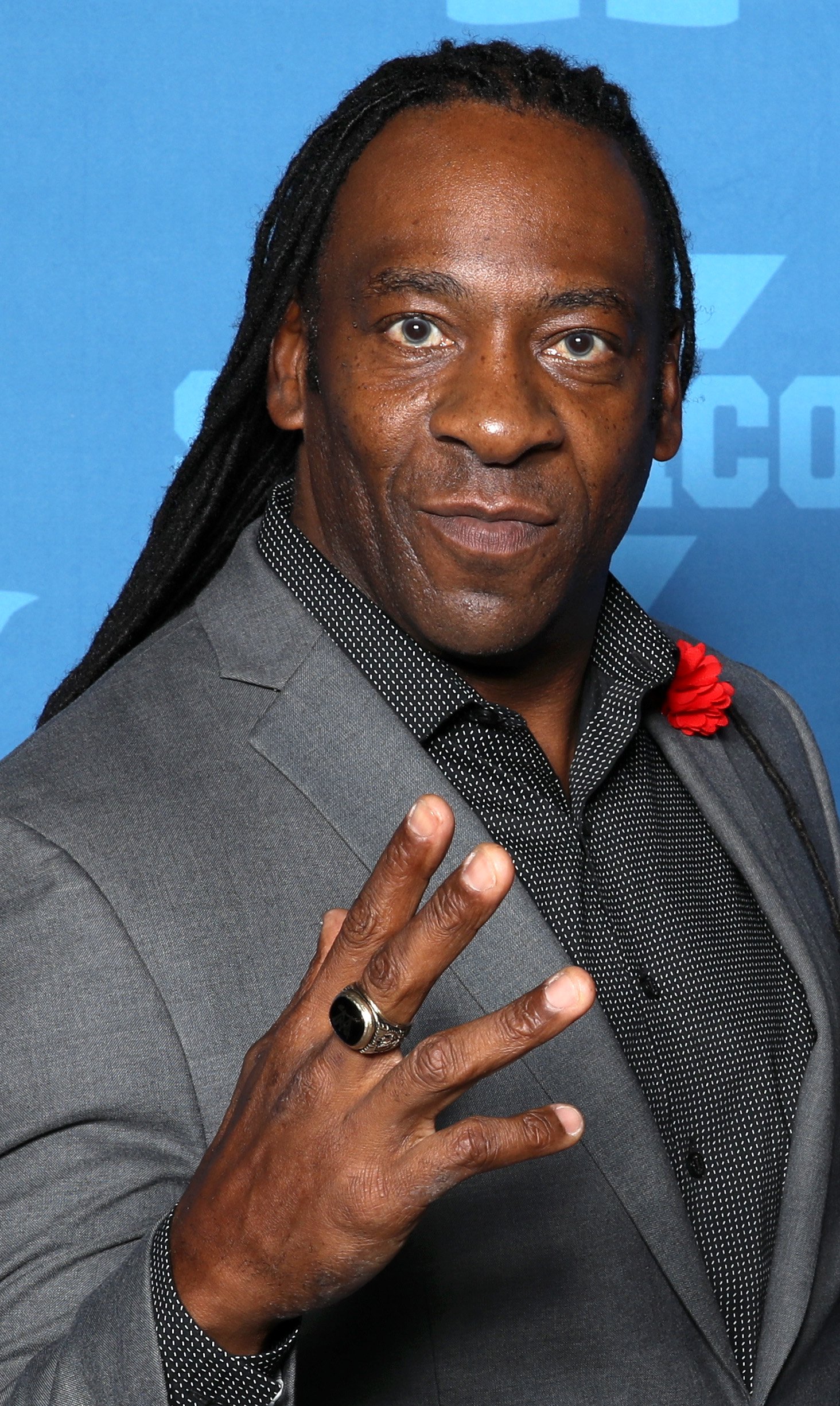
Booker T

Name	Real name	Notes
Booker T	Booker Huffman Jr.	Color commentator Hall of Famer; LFG coach Commentator for PLEs on WWE Radio
Emily Agard	Emily Agard	Backstage interviewer
Mike Rome	Austin Romero	Ring announcer
Sarah Schreiber	Sarah Schreiber	Backstage interviewer
Vic Joseph	Victor Travagliante	Play-by-play commentator Commentator for Main Event; Commentator for LFG; Commentator for PLEs on WWE Radio

=== Evolve ===
Name	Real name	Notes
Blake Howard	Blake Chadwick	Play-by-play commentator Backstage interviewer for NXT; Commentator for Main Event
Chuey Martinez	Chuey Martinez	Backstage interviewer Interviewer for select WWE/AAA events
Ryan Katz	Ryan Katz	Ring announcer NXT Producer

=== Other ===
Name	Real name	Notes
Andrea Bazarte	Andrea Bazarte	WWE Español Digital Host; Host of WWE Ahora; Backstage interviewer for Lucha Libre AAA on Fox
Big E	Ettore Ewen	Pre-show analyst for PLEs
Calvin Knie	Calvin Knie	German-language commentator on PLEs
Carlo Pamintuan	Carlo Pamintuan	Tagalog-language commentator on PLEs
Christophe Agius	Christophe Agius	French-language commentator on Raw, SmackDown, and PLEs
Dan Vollmayer	Daniel Vollmayer	Digital Host
Eduardo Bates	Eduardo Bates	Host of WWE Ahora
Funaki	Shoichi Funaki	Japanese-language color commentator on PLEs; Japanese-language host of This Week in WWE
Jeremy Borash	Jeremy Borash	Commentator for LFG; Vice President of Content and Development; Director of WWE Latin America; Writer for NXT and Lucha Libre AAA on Fox
Jerry Soto	Jerry Soto	Spanish-language color commentator on Raw, SmackDown, and PLEs; Co-host of WWE en Español
Jesús Zuñiga	Jesús Zuñiga	Ring announcer for Lucha Libre AAA on Fox
John "Bradshaw" Layfield	John Layfield	Commentator for Lucha Libre AAA on Fox; Hall of Famer
José Manuel Guillén	José Manuel Guillén	Spanish-language play-by-play commentator for Lucha Libre AAA on Fox
Konnan	Charles Ashenoff	Commentator for select WWE/AAA events Writer for Lucha Libre AAA on Fox; AAA Hall of Famer
Lilian Garcia	Lilián Garcia	Ring announcer for Saturday Night's Main Event; Ring announcer for select WWE/AAA events
Marcelo Rodríguez	Marcelo Rodríguez Laprea	Spanish-language lead commentator on Raw, SmackDown, and PLEs; Co-host of WWE en Español
Megan Morant	Megan O'Brian	Host of Main Event; Co-host of Raw Recap
Nadir Mohammedi	Nadir Mohammedi	French-language commentator on PLEs
Peter Rosenberg	Peter Rosenberg	Pre-show analyst for PLEs
Roberto Figueroa	Roberto de Jesús Figueroa Salazar	Spanish-language color commentator for Lucha Libre AAA on Fox
Sam Roberts	Samuel Roberts	Co-host of Raw Recap; Pre-show analyst for PLEs
Savio Vega	Juan Rivera	Occasional commentator for Lucha Libre AAA on Fox; AAA Producer
Stan Sy	Stanly Sy	Tagalog-language commentator on PLEs
Stephanie McMahon	Stephanie McMahon Levesque	Host of Saturday Night's Main Event; Hall of Famer; TKO minority shareholder
Tim Haber	Timothy Haber	German-language commentator on PLEs
Vero Rodríguez	Verónica Rodríguez Cuesta	Interviewer for select WWE/AAA events

== Ambassadors ==
=== WWE Legends ===
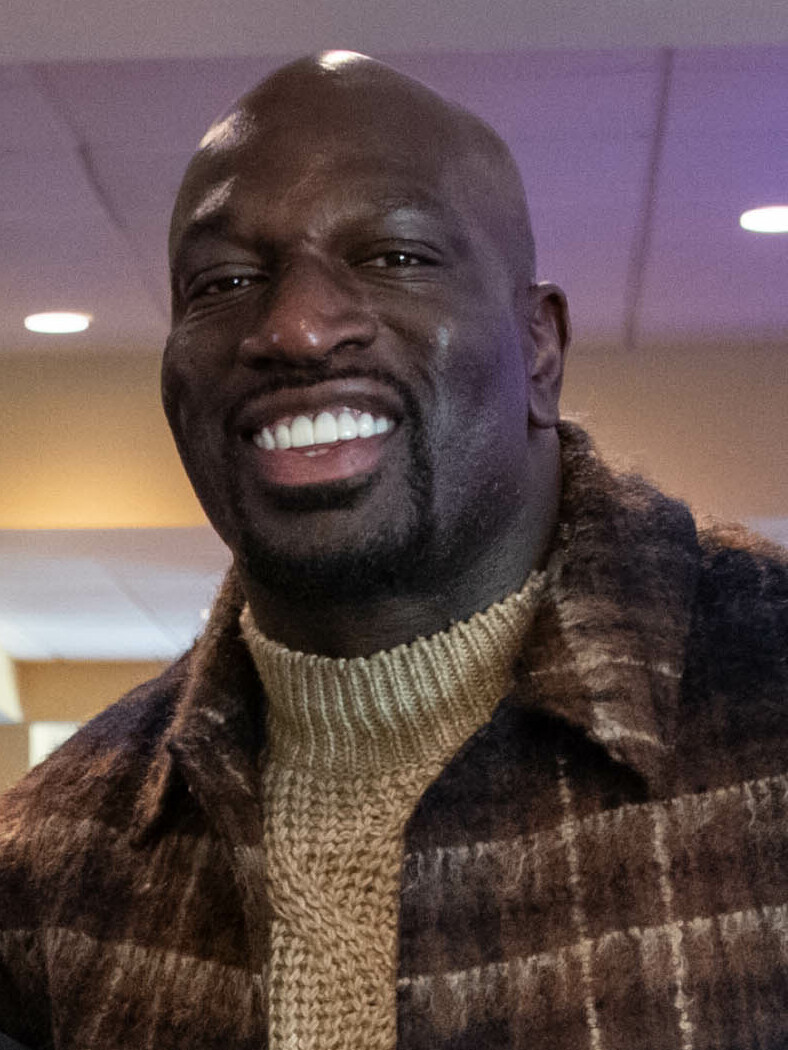
Titus O'Neil

Since 2003, select former or retired WWE wrestlers not on the main roster (billed as "WWE Legends") as well as select celebrities and other wrestling personalities have contracts to appear in WWE video games and action figure lines, and additionally make periodic appearances—either on WWE TV or for promotional events—serving as "ambassadors" (public representatives/spokespeople) for the company. The deals offered under the WWE Legends program are sometimes referred to as "nostalgia contracts".

Name	Real name	Notes
Armando Estrada	Hazem Ali	
Ax	William Eadie	Hall of Famer
Bad Bunny	Benito Martínez Ocasio	
Batista	David Bautista Jr.	Hall of Famer-designate
Bob Backlund	Robert Backlund	Hall of Famer
The Boogeyman	Martin Wright	
Bubba Ray Dudley	Mark LoMonaco	Hall of Famer; LFG coach
D-Von Dudley	Devon Hughes	Hall of Famer
Diamond Dallas Page	Dallas Page	Hall of Famer
Eve Torres	Eve Torres Gracie	
The Godfather	Charles Wright	Hall of Famer
The Honky Tonk Man	Roy Farris	Hall of Famer
Hornswoggle	Dylan Postl	
Jacqueline	Jacqueline Moore	Hall of Famer
Jake Roberts	Aurelian Smith Jr.	Hall of Famer
Jerry Lawler	Jerry Lawler	Hall of Famer
Jimmy Hart	James Hart	Hall of Famer
Jim Duggan	James Duggan Jr.	Hall of Famer
John Cena	John Cena	
Kelly Kelly	Barbara Coba	
Ken Shamrock	Kenneth Shamrock	
Kevin Nash	Kevin Nash	Hall of Famer
Kurt Angle	Kurt Angle	Hall of Famer
Lana	Catherine Perry	
Leilani Kai	Patty Seymour	
Lex Luger	Lawrence Pfohl	Wellness Counselor; Hall of Famer
Maria Menounos	Maria Menounos	
Mark Henry	Mark Henry	Hall of Famer
Maryse	Maryse Mizanin	
Michelle McCool	Michelle Calaway	Hall of Famer
Mosh	Chaz Warrington	
Mr. Kennedy	Kenneth Anderson	
Necro Butcher	Dylan Summers	
Psicosis	Dionicio Castellanos Torres	AAA Hall of Famer
Rick Steiner	Robert Rechsteiner	Hall of Famer
Ricky Steamboat	Richard Blood Sr.	Hall of Famer
Rob Van Dam	Robert Szatkowski	Hall of Famer
Scott Steiner	Scott Rechsteiner	Hall of Famer
Sgt. Slaughter	Robert Remus	Hall of Famer
Smash	Barry Darsow	Hall of Famer
Spike Dudley	Matthew Hyson	
"Stone Cold" Steve Austin	Steve Austin	Hall of Famer
Tamina	Sarona Reiher Snuka-Polamalu	
Tatanka	Christopher Chavis	
Tatsumi Fujinami	Tatsumi Fujinami	Hall of Famer
Ted DiBiase	Theodore DiBiase Sr.	Hall of Famer
Thrasher	Glenn Ruth	
Titus O'Neil	Thaddeus Bullard	Global Ambassador; Hall of Famer
Typhoon	Fred Ottman	Hall of Famer
Victoria	Lisa Varon	
X-Pac	Sean Waltman	WWE ID coach Hall of Famer

=== WWE NIL ===
Since 2021, WWE has operated the WWE Next in Line (WWE NIL) talent-recruiting system, in which select U.S.-based college athletes (billed as "WWE NIL prospects") are entered into name, image, and likeness agreements with WWE. These college athletes serve as "ambassadors" for the company at collegiate events and on social media, and receive training from WWE in brand building, media communication, live event promotion, creative writing, and community relations. Select NIL athletes receive full access to the WWE Performance Center in Orlando, Florida and, upon graduating from college, may be offered a full-time WWE developmental contract.

Name	Real name	Notes
Bianca Pizano	Bianca Pizano	Scouted from Michigan State University
Carlos Aviles	Carlos Aviles	Scouted from The Ohio State University
Desmond Coleman	Desmond Coleman	Scouted from Liberty University
Jacob Henry	Jacob Henry	Scouted from University of Oklahoma
Jeremy Cody	Jeremy Cody	Scouted from University of Miami
Kali Terza	Kali Terza	Scouted from Kennesaw State University
Kerrigan Huynh	Kerrigan Huynh	Scouted from University of Central Oklahoma
KeShaun Moore	KeShaun Moore	Scouted from Hampton University
Maliq Carr	Maliq Carr	Scouted from Michigan State University
Slane Glover	Slane Glover	Scouted from The Ohio State University
TJ Bullard	Thaddeus Bullard Jr.	Scouted from University of Central Florida
Zuriel Jimenez	Zuriel Jimenez	Scouted from Columbia University

== Creative team ==
Name	Real name	Notes
Alexandra Williams	Alexandra Williams	Vice President and Lead Writer for Raw
Andrea Concepcion	Andrea Concepcion	Senior Writer for NXT
Ben Saccoccio	Ben Saccoccio	Writer for Raw
Brandon Carroll	Brandon Carroll	Writer for NXT
Brian Parise	Brian Parise	Writer for Raw
Bruce Prichard	Bruce Prichard	Executive Director
Bryan Yang	Bryan Yang	Writer for Raw
Chad Barbash	Chad Barbash	Senior Writer for Raw
Christian Scovell	Christian Scovell	Writer for SmackDown
Colby Applegate	Colby Applegate	Writer for NXT
Colin Clark	Colin Clark	Senior Writer for SmackDown
Cyrus Kowsari	Cyrus Kowsari	Senior Director of Creative Strategy
Devyn Prieto	Devyn Prieto	Writer for SmackDown
Dorian Roldán	Dorian Joaquín Roldán Peña	Writer for Lucha Libre AAA on Fox; Interim General Manager of Lucha Libre AAA on Fox; AAA CEO and Director of Operations
Drake Maverick	James Curtin	Writer for Raw
Ed Koskey	Edward Koskey	Senior Vice President of Creative Writing
Eric Watts	Eric Watts	Writer for SmackDown
Gabe Sapolsky	Gabriel Sapolsky	Creative Consultant; Writer for NXT and Evolve; Talent scout Head of WWE ID
Ioannis Fillippides	Ioannis Fillippides	Writer for SmackDown
John Swikata	John Swikata	Lead writer for SmackDown
John Trowbridge	John Trowbridge	Writer for Raw
Johnny Russo	Johnny Russo	Vice President and Lead Writer for NXT
Jonathan Baeckstrom	Jonathan Baeckstrom	Lead writer for Raw
Kirsten Koedding	Kirsten Koedding	Writer for Raw
Michael Kirshenbaum	Michael Kirshenbaum	Writer for SmackDown
"Moody" Jack Meléndez	Héctor Meléndez	Writer for Lucha Libre AAA on Fox; AAA Producer
Pat Levin	Pat Levin	Writer for SmackDown
Patrick Scott	Patrick McAlpine	Writer for SmackDown
Paul Heyman	Paul Heyman	Creative Advisor; Hall of Famer
Rob Fee	Robert Fee	Director of Character Development
Ryan Ward	Ryan Ward	Vice President of Creative Writing; Lead writer for SmackDown
Sondra Lacey	Sondra Lacey	Writer for SmackDown
Zach Hyatt	Zach Hyatt	Writer for NXT

== Producers ==
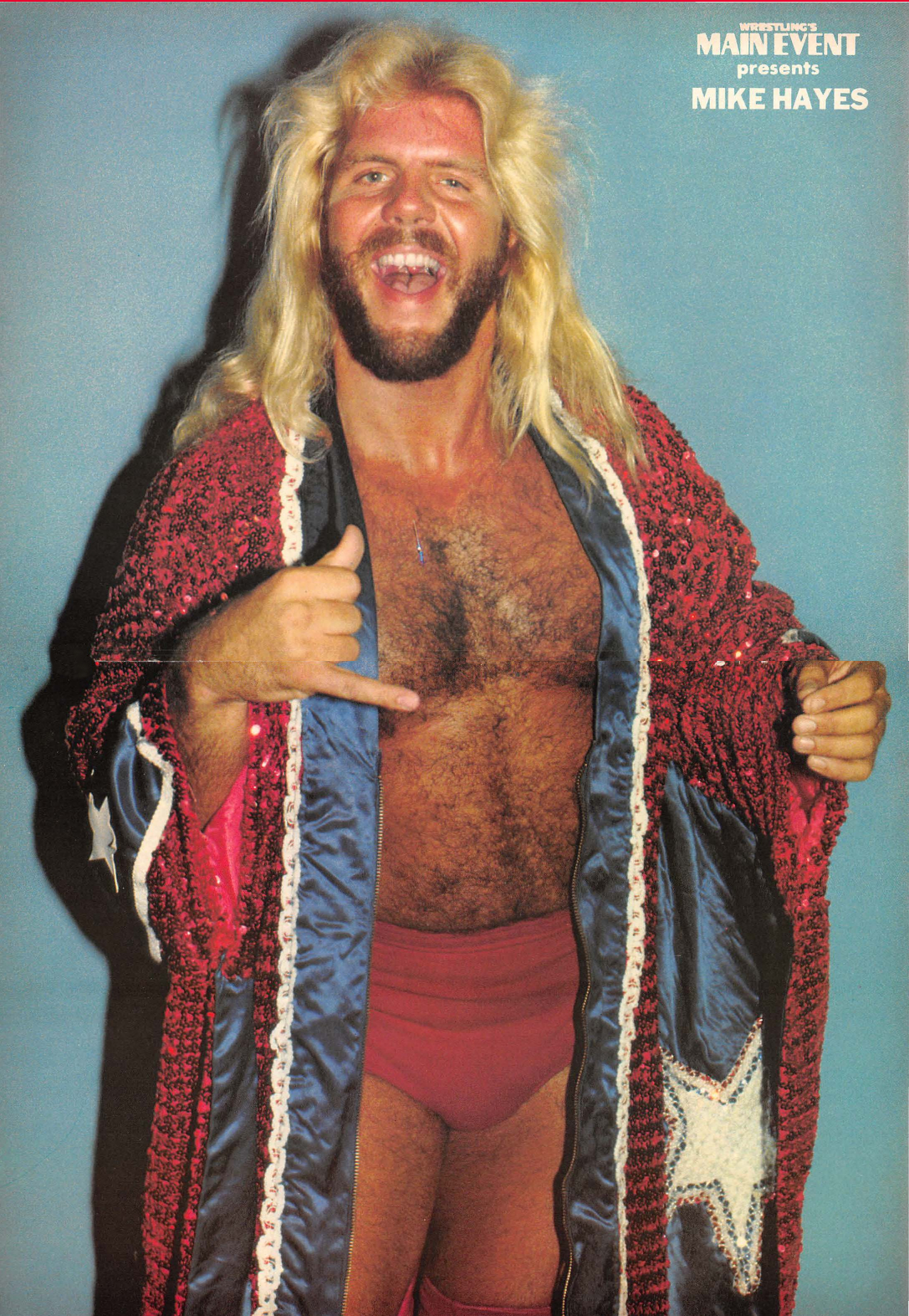
Michael Hayes

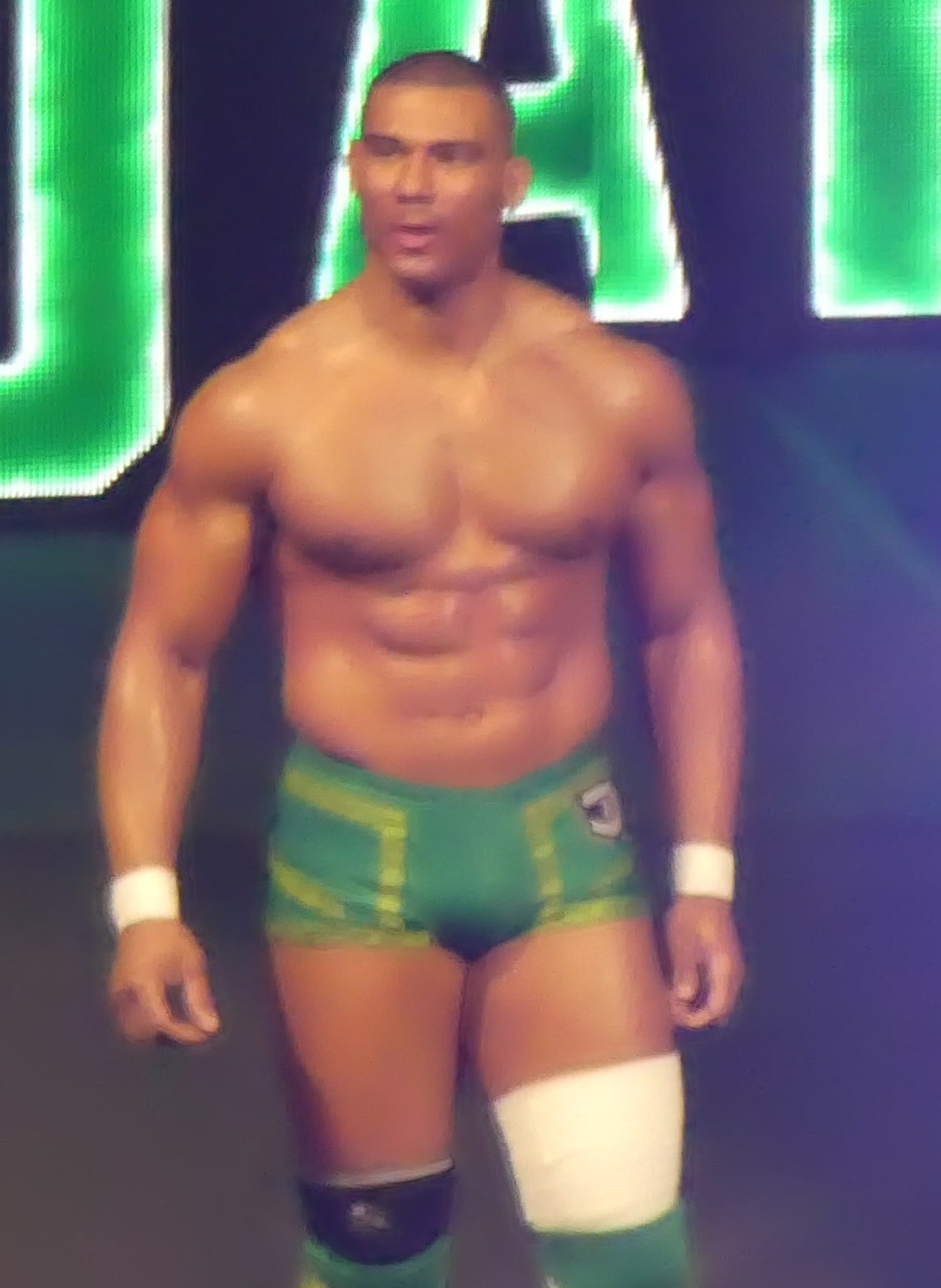
Jason Jordan

Name	Real name	Notes
Billy Kidman	Peter Gruner Jr.	Program Coordinator
Bobby Roode	Robert Roode Jr.	
Chris Parks	Christopher Park	
Eric Young	Jeremy Fritz	NXT Producer
Jamie Noble	James Gibson	
Jason Jordan	Nathan Everhart	Lead Producer
Kenny Dykstra	Kenneth Doane	
Michael Hayes	Michael Seitz	Senior Producer; Vice President, Creative Writing & Booking; Hall of Famer
Molly Holly	Nora Greenwald	Hall of Famer
Petey Williams	Peter Williams III	
Shane Helms	Gregory Helms	
Shawn Daivari	Dara Daivari	
TJ Wilson	Theodore Wilson	

== Music department ==
Name	Notes
Anthony Mirabella	Music Producer
Jonathan Hammer	Senior Director of Music, Marketing & Catalog
Neil Lawi	Senior Vice President of WWE Music Group; General Manager of WWE Music Group
Tom Cahill	Music Cue Administrator

== Performance Center staff ==
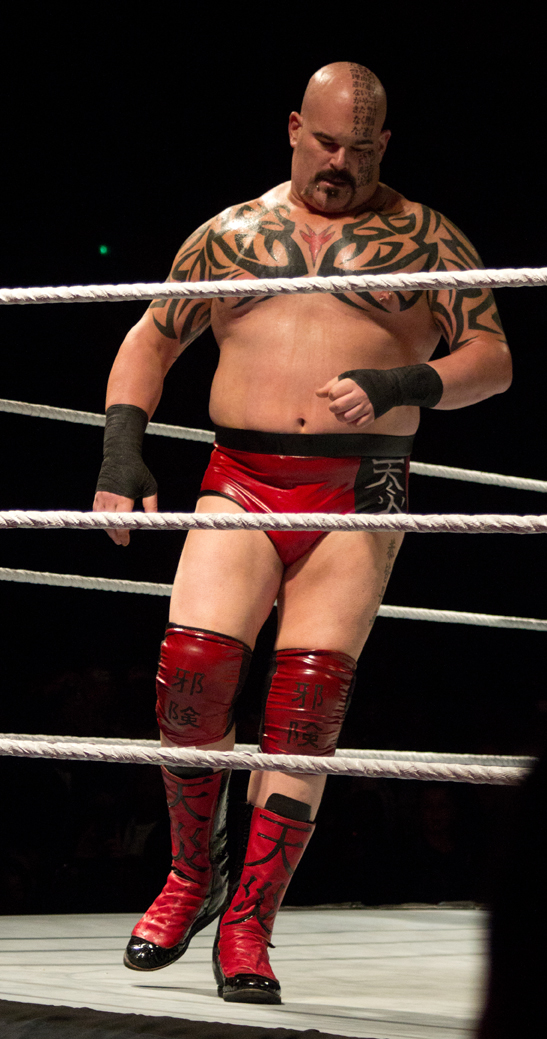
Matt Bloom

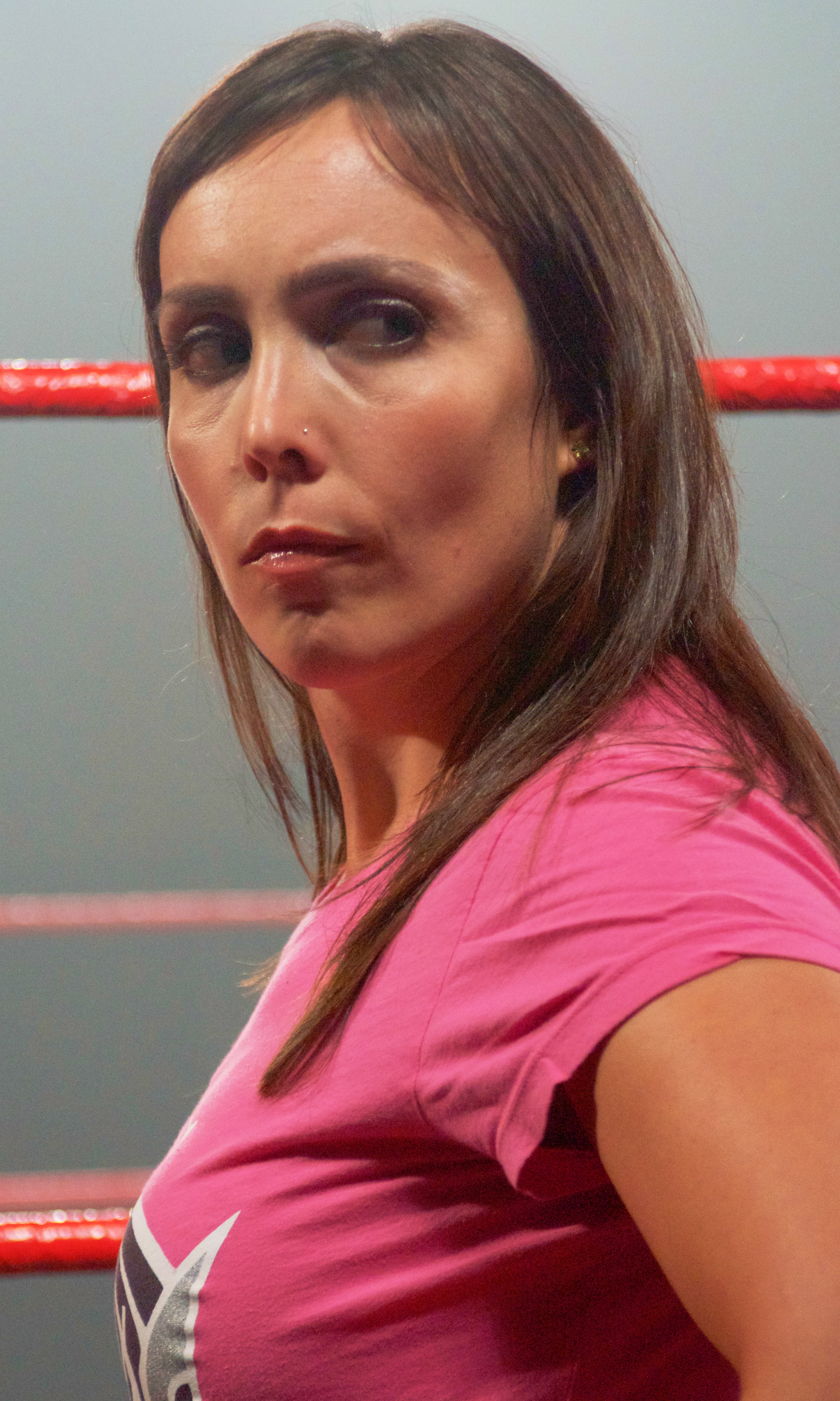
Sara Amato

As both NXT and Evolve are based at the Performance Center (PC), PC coaches and trainers also work as producers for those brands.

Name	Real name	Notes
AJ Styles	Allen Jones	Coach; Talent scout Hall of Famer
Alexander James	Alexander Winkler	Coach
Alexa Scully	Alexa Scully	Nutritionist
Brian Duncan	Brian Duncan	Head Athletic Trainer
Fit Finlay	David Finlay Jr.	Coach; Makes guest appearances on NXT
Jay Ferruggia	Jay Ferruggia	Fitness Advisor
Jazz	Carlene Moore-Begnaud	Coach
Johnny Moss	John Mossop	Coach
JP Major	Jonathan Patrick	Director of Strength and Conditioning
Lince Dorado	José Cordero	Coach; AAA Producer; Occasionally wrestles on Evolve and Lucha Libre AAA on Fox
Logan Byman	Logan Byman	Performance specialist
Matt Bloom	Matthew Bloom	Performance Center Head Coach; Vice President of Talent Development; AAA Producer
Norman Smiley	Norman Smiley	Coach; AAA Producer
Oney Lorcan	Christopher Girard	Coach
Robbie Brookside	Robert Brooks	Coach
Sara Amato	Sara Amato	Assistant Coach
Sarah Barnett	Sarah Barnett	Performance specialist
Steve Corino	Steven Corino	Coach
Tara Halaby	Tara Halaby	Physical therapist
Terry Taylor	Paul Taylor III	Coach
Wesley Blake	Cory Weston	Coach

== Medical team ==
Name	Notes
Chris Robinson	Ringside physician
Jeffrey Dugas	Associate Medical Director
Jeffrey Westerfield	Ringside physician
Thomas Sisk	Orthopaedic physician
Joseph Maroon	Medical consultant
James Andrews	Medical consultant
Matthew Beidleman	Physician
Christopher Carter	Sports medicine physician
Emily Bell Casey	Sports medicine physician
Ricardo Colberg	Musculoskeletal sonographer
Rachel Henderson	Physical therapist
Monte Ketchum	Orthopaedic physician
T. Daniel Smith	Sports medicine physician
Jay Umarvadia	Musculoskeletal specialist
José Ortega	General practitioner
Charles Carnel	Interventional spine specialist
Christopher Beaumont	Surgeon; Hand, wrist & upper extremity specialist
E. Lyle Cain Jr.	Sports medicine and arthroscopy surgeon
Andrew Cordover	Spinal surgeon
Jeffrey Davis	General orthopaedic and joint replacement surgeon
Benton Emblom	Surgeon for sports medicine, arthroscopy hip preservation
Christopher Garrett	Surgeon for sports medicine, arthroscopy, hip preservation & joint replacement
Daniel Kim	Spinal surgeon
B. Wayne McGough Jr.	Sports medicine and arthroscopy surgeon
Kathleen McKeon	Surgeon; Hand and wrist specialist
K. David Moore	Joint replacement specialist
Charles Pitts Jr.	Surgeon; Foot and ankle specialist
Marcus Rothermich	Arthroscopic surgeon
Norman Waldrop III	Foot and ankle surgeon
Jonathan Berry	Wrist and hand therapist
Connor Flanagan	Hand therapist
Kramer Hodges	Hand therapist
Holly Koster	Hand therapist
Quinn Malbrough	Wrist and hand therapist

== Corporate staff ==
=== Senior management ===
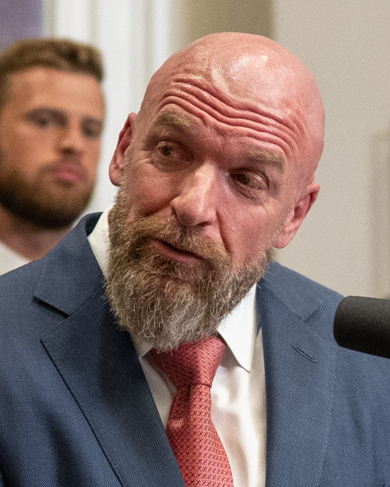
Triple H

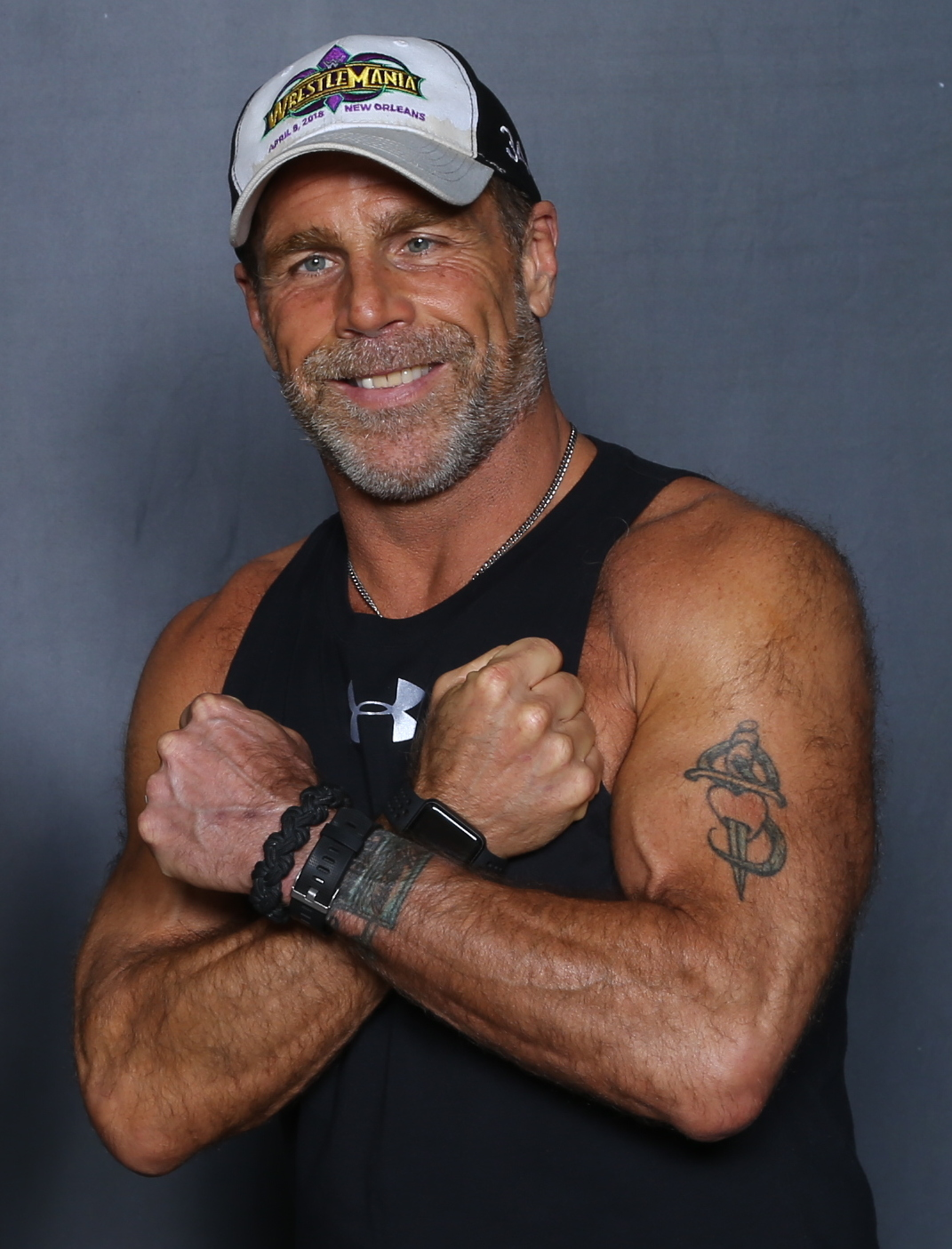
Shawn Michaels

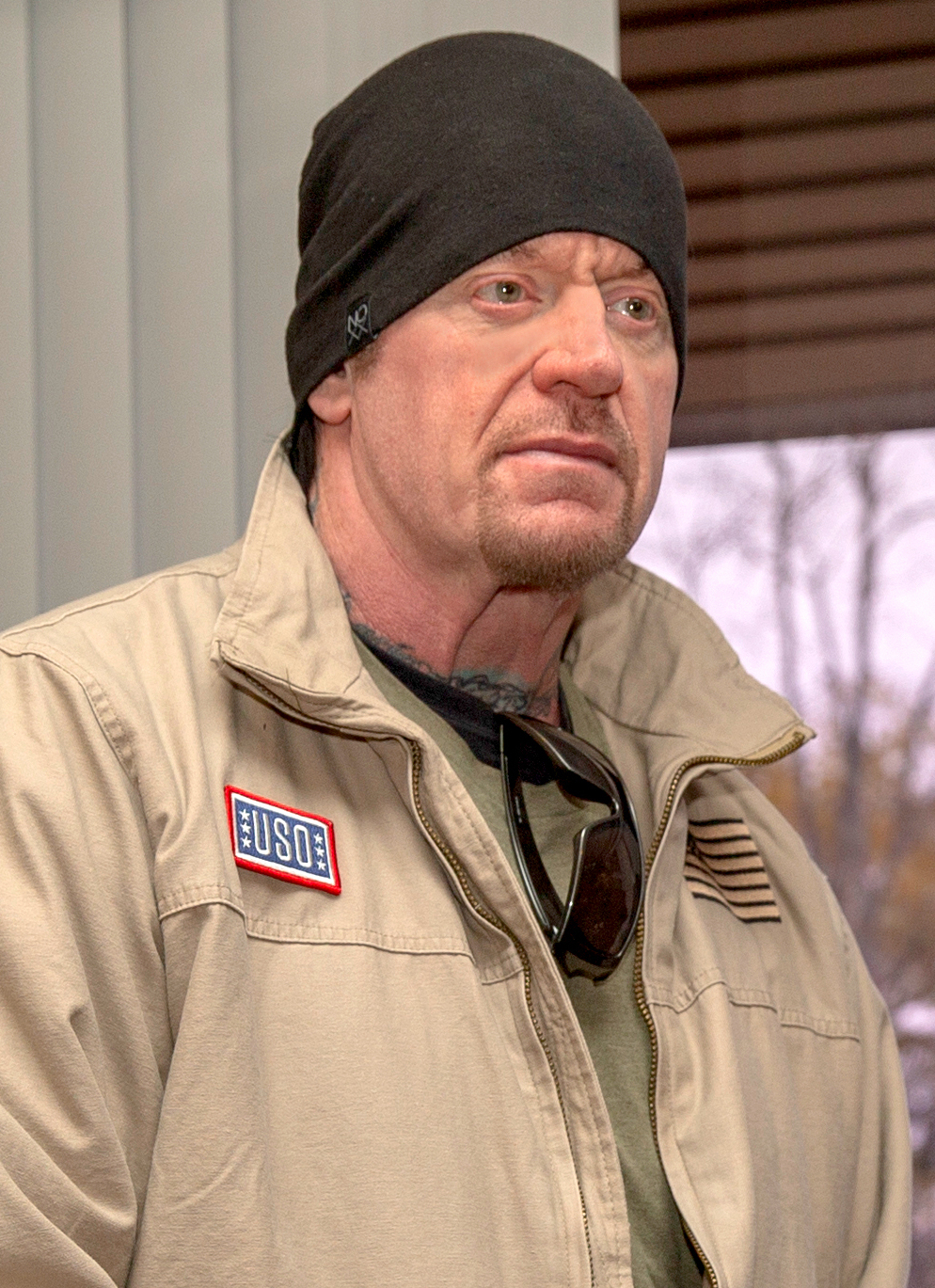
The Undertaker

Name	Real name	Notes
Aggie Dent	Aggie Dent	Senior Manager of Talent Relations
Alex Varga	Alex Varga	Executive Vice President
Brian Fadem	Brian Fadem	Vice President of Line Producing; NXT Lead Producer
Ben Houser	Ben Houser	Head of Original Content and Development
Chris Legentil	Chris Legentil	Executive Vice President of Talent Relations; Head of Communications
Hunter Selby	Hunter Selby	Director of Show Production and Design
Jim Smallman	James Smallman	International Talent Scout
Joel Zietcer	Joel Zietcer	Senior Director of Global Communications
Justin Scalise	Justin Scalise	Executive Vice President of Live Events
Kasey Kralik	Kasey Kralik	Talent Relations Manager
Lee Fitting	Lee Fitting	Head of Media and Production; Executive Producer
Lee Lipschulz	Lee Lipschulz	Director for SmackDown
Marisela Peña	Marisela Peña Roldán	President of AAA; AAA Hall of Famer
Marty Miller	Marty Miller	Director for Raw and PLEs
Maurice Jenkins	Maurice Jenkins	Associate Producer
Rajan Mehta	Rajan Mehta	Chief Technology Officer
Sara Robledo García	Sara Robledo García	WWE Latin America Senior Digital and Social Manager
Scott Zanghellini	Scott Zanghellini	Executive Vice President of Consumer Products
Shawn Michaels	Michael Hickenbottom	Senior Vice President of Talent Development Creative; Hall of Famer
Steve Braband	Steve Braband	Head of Digital Media
Sue Cundaro	Susan Cundaro	Vice President of Announcing
The Undertaker	Mark Calaway	Head of Creative for AAA; Hall of Famer
Thomas Schiller	Thomas Schiller	Graphics Producer
Triple H	Paul Levesque	Chief Content Officer; Head of Creative for WWE; Executive Producer; Hall of Famer
William Regal	Darren Matthews	Vice President of Global Talent Development; Makes guest appearances on NXT
Zachary Maxwell	Zachary Maxwell	Director of Talent Relations

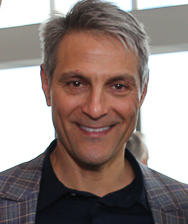
Ari Emanuel

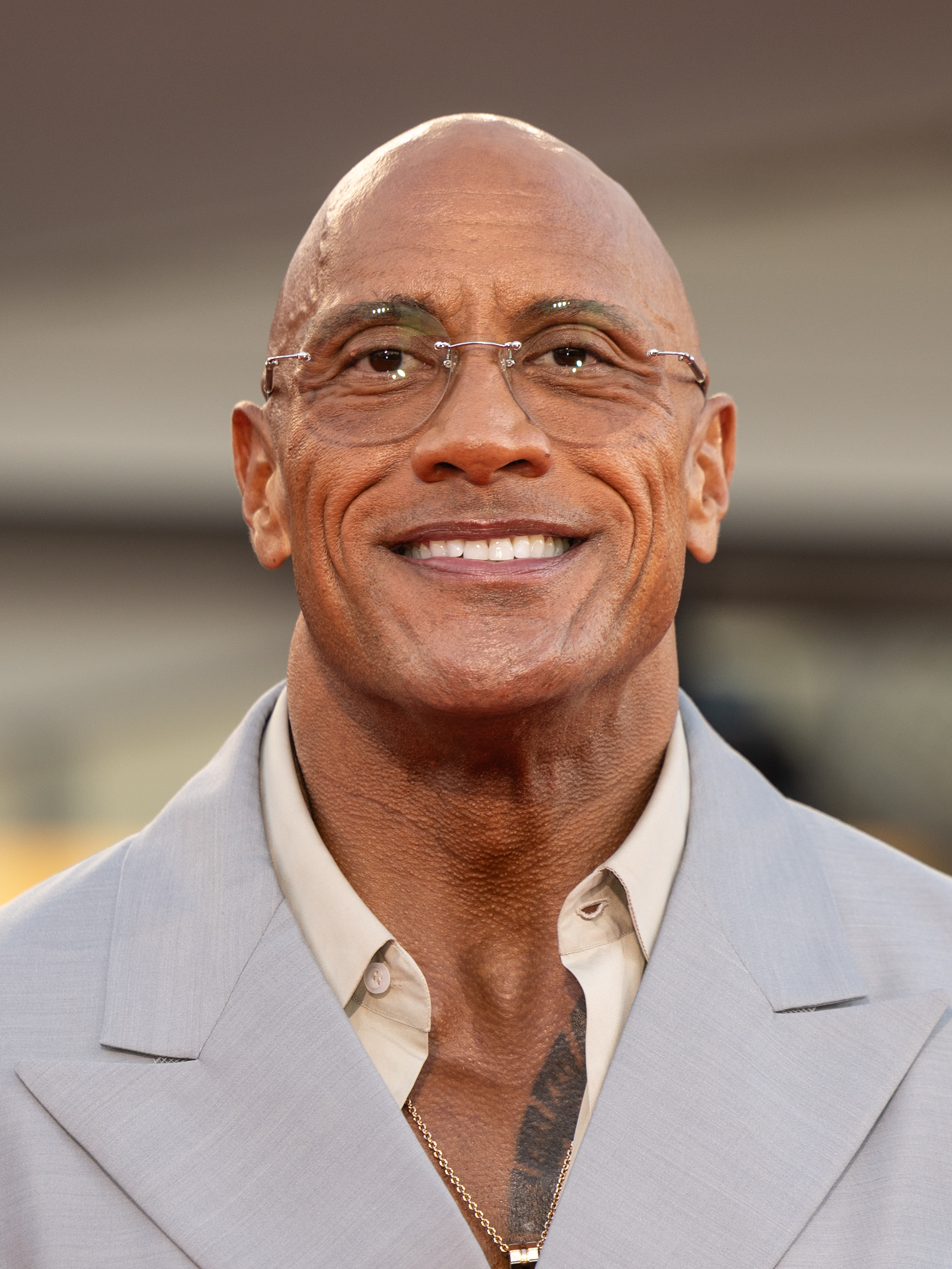
The Rock

=== TKO Board of Directors ===
Name	Real name	Role
Ari Emanuel	Ariel Zev Emanuel	CEO and Executive Chairman of TKO Group Holdings
Brad Keywell	Bradley Keywell	Executive Chairman of Uptake Technologies
Carrie Wheeler	Carrie Wheeler	CEO of Opendoor
Egon Durban	Egon Durban	Co-CEO of Silver Lake Management
Jonathan Kraft	Jonathan Kraft	President of the Kraft Group and the New England Patriots
Mark Shapiro	Mark Shapiro	President and COO of TKO Group Holdings
Nancy Tellem	Nancy Tellem	Chief Media Officer of Eko
Nick Khan	Nicholas Khan	President of WWE
Peter Bynoe	Peter Bynoe	Senior Advisor of DLA Piper
Sonya Medina Williams	Sonya Medina Williams	President and Executive Director for Reach Resilience
Steve Koonin	Steve Koonin	Lead Independent Director of TKO Group Holdings; CEO of Atlanta Hawks
The Rock	Dwayne Johnson	Co-owner of the United Football League

== See also ==
- List of Lucha Libre AAA Worldwide personnel
- List of current champions in WWE
- List of former WWE personnel
- List of professional wrestling personnel
