= The Vanity Project (professional wrestling) =

Stable
- Name: The Vanity Project
- Leader: Jackson Drake
- Members: Brad Baylor; Ricky Smokes; Myka Lockwood
- Combined billed weight: 599 lb (272 kg)
- Former members: Bryce Donovan; Zayda Steel
- Debut: April 23, 2025
- Years active: 2025–present

The Vanity Project is a villainous professional wrestling stable signed to WWE, where they perform on the NXT brand. The group consists of leader Jackson Drake, Brad Baylor, Ricky Smokes, and Myka Lockwood. Baylor and Smokes are the current NXT Tag Team Champions in their second reign whereas Drake is the current NXT North American Champion in his first reign. Drake is also a former one-time and the inaugural WWE Evolve Champion.

== History ==
=== WWE ===
==== Evolve (2025–2026) ====
On the March 5, 2025 episode of Evolve, Jackson Drake and Swipe Right (Brad Baylor and Ricky Smokes) lost to Jack Cartwheel, Sean Legacy and Cappuccino Jones in a six-man tag team match in Evolve's first main event after its revival in WWE. On the April 23 episode, Drake, Swipe Right, Bryce Donovan, and Zayda Steel joined together to form The Vanity Project stable. On the May 21 episode, Steel lost in a Fatal Four-Way match against Kylie Rae, Aria Bennett, and Chantel Monroe to earn an opportunity to become the inaugural WWE Evolve Women's Champion. On the June 4 episode, Drake defeated Sean Legacy, Edris Enofe, and Keanu Carver in a fatal four-way elimination match to become the inaugural WWE Evolve Champion. After weeks of Drake blaming Donovan—who was the group's enforcer—for the group's failures, Donovan announced on the October 8 episode that he was done with the stable and that he would take the WWE Evolve Championship away from Drake on the following week. He would then begin fighting against his former stablemates. At Evolve: Succession on October 15, Drake defeated Donovan to retain the title. On October 9, Steel announced that she would not be renewing her WWE ID contract. She wrestled her last WWE televised match on the October 22 episode of Evolve, where she was defeated by Thea Hail. She made her last televised appearance with the group on the following week's episode. On the March 18, 2026 episode of Evolve, Drake lost the WWE Evolve Championship to Aaron Rourke in what would be The Vanity Project's final appearance on the brand, ending his reign at 301 days, although WWE recognizes it as ending at 287 days due to tape delay.

==== NXT (2026–present) ====
On the January 13, 2026 episode of NXT, The Vanity Project were promoted to the NXT brand. On the February 24 episode, Baylor and Smokes won the NXT Tag Team Championship by dethroning DarkState (Osiris Griffin and Saquon Shugars) after an interference by Tony D'Angelo. On April 4 at NXT Stand & Deliver, Baylor and Smokes successfully defended their NXT Tag Team Championships against Los Americanos (Rayo Americano and Bravo Americano). At Week 2 of NXT: Revenge on April 21, Drake was stood up by his date, leading to a chance meeting and connection with Myka Lockwood, who revealed that Drake had been catfished by a chatbot. Following this revelation, The Vanity Project accused Shiloh Hill of being behind the deception. On the May 5 episode of NXT, Drake defeated Jasper Troy after an intervention by Lockwood. While the referee was distracted, Lockwood performed a body slam on Troy at ringside, allowing Drake to secure the victory. Following the match, Lockwood officially aligned herself with The Vanity Project. Baylor and Smokes' reign as the NXT Tag Team Champions ended on the August 4 episode of NXT, losing the title to Myles Borne and Tavion Heights. At NXT Heatwave on August 30, Baylor and Smokes defeated Borne and Heights for the NXT Tag Team Championship whereas Drake defeated Borne for the NXT North American Championship. Lockwood wrestled her first NXT match at Worlds Collide taped on September 26, where the team of Baylor, Smokes, Lockwood, and Mini Abismo Negro lost to the team of Mr. Iguana, La Parka, Adelicious, and Mascarita Sagrada in a Relevos Atómicos de Locura.

== Members ==
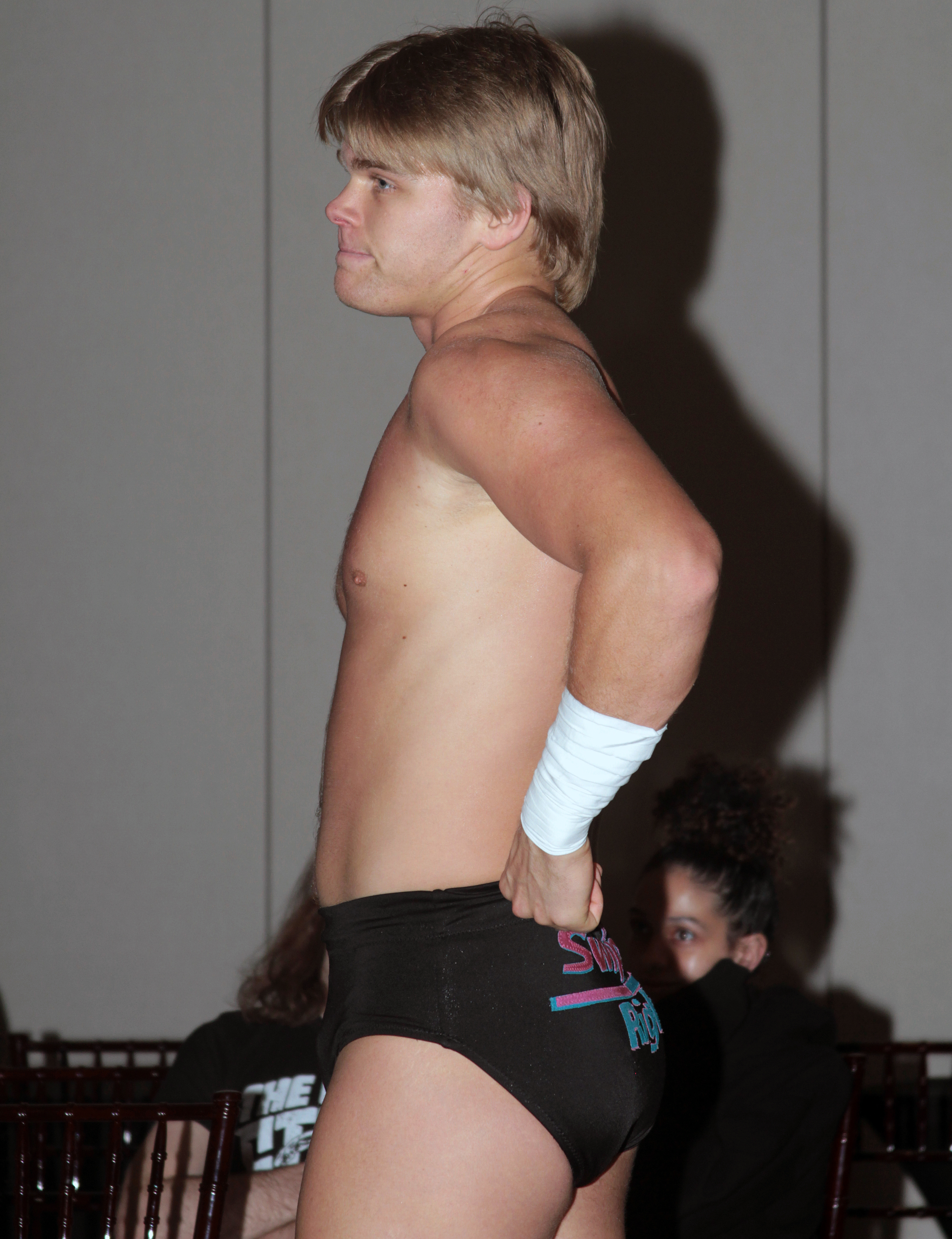
Brad Baylor

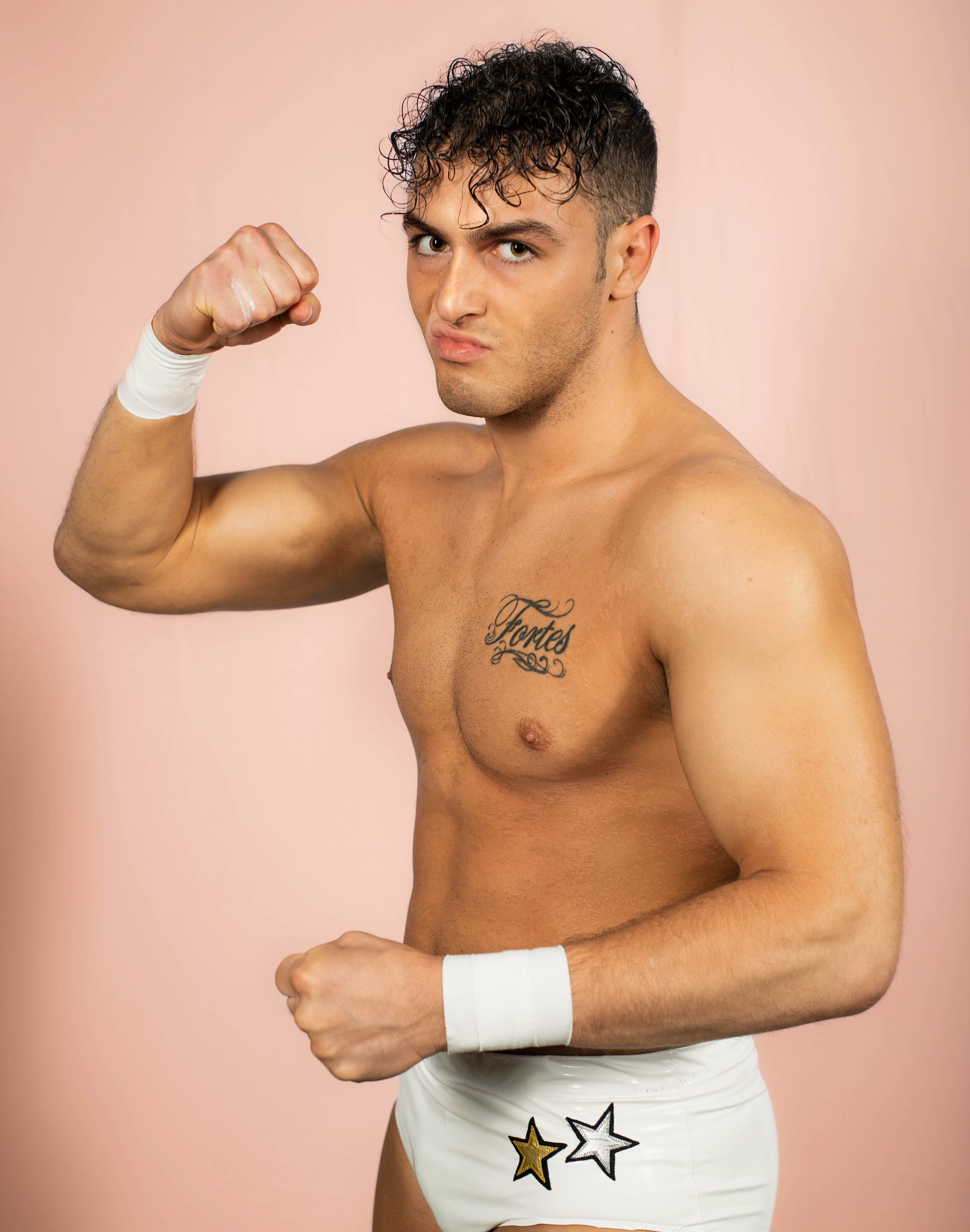
Ricky Smokes

*	Founding member
L	Leader

=== Current ===
Member	Joined
Jackson Drake (L)	April 23, 2025 *
Brad Baylor	April 23, 2025 *
Ricky Smokes	April 23, 2025 *
Myka Lockwood	May 5, 2026

=== Former ===
Member	Joined	Left
Bryce Donovan	April 23, 2025 *	October 8, 2025
Zayda Steel	April 23, 2025 *	October 29, 2025

== Sub-groups ==
=== Current ===
Affiliate	Members	Tenure	Type
Swipe Right	Brad Baylor	2025–present	Tag team
Swipe Right	Ricky Smokes	2025–present	Tag team

== Championships and accomplishments ==
- Alpha-1 Wrestling
  - A1 Tag Team Championship (1 time) – Baylor and Smokes
- Beyond Wrestling
  - Wrestling Open Championship (1 time) – Donovan
  - Wrestling Open Tag Team Championship (1 time) – Baylor and Smokes
- Northeast Wrestling
  - NEW Tag Team Championship (1 time) – Baylor and Smokes
- WWE
  - NXT North American Championship (1 time, current) – Drake
  - WWE Evolve Championship (1 time, inaugural) – Drake
  - NXT Tag Team Championship (2 times, current) – Baylor and Smokes
