= Myka Lockwood =

American professional wrestler and former acrobatics athlete

Personal information
- Born: Bayley Humphrey; June 7, 2001 (age 25) Chandler, Arizona, U.S.

Professional wrestling career
- Trained by: WWE Performance Center; The Undertaker
- Debut: 2025

Bayley Humphrey (born June 7, 2001) is an American professional wrestler and former collegiate acrobatics athlete. She is signed to WWE, where she performs on the NXT brand under the ring name Myka Lockwood and is a member of The Vanity Project stable.

== Early life ==
Humphrey was born in Chandler, Arizona and attended Hamilton High School before joining Mesa Community College, where she also competed in gymnastics.

She attended Baylor University, where she majored in Health Science Studies and competed in the university's nationally recognized acrobatics and tumbling program. During her collegiate career, Humphrey gained attention online for her familial partial lipodystrophy and athletic performances while competing as part of Baylor's acrobatics and tumbling team.

She later joined WWE through the company's Next In Line (NIL) athlete recruitment program.

== Professional wrestling career ==
=== WWE (2024–present) ===
Humphrey signed with WWE and began training at the WWE Performance Center as part of the company's developmental system. She appeared on the first two seasons of WWE LFG, where she was coached by The Undertaker. On March 10, 2026, WWE filed a trademark for the ring name Myka Lockwood which Humphrey confirmed that it was hers on social media. Lockwood made her televised debut at Week 2 of NXT: Revenge on April 21, when The Vanity Project's Jackson Drake was stood up by his date, leading to a chance meeting and connection with Lockwood, who revealed that Drake had been catfished by a chatbot. On the May 5 episode of NXT, Lockwood aligned herself with The Vanity Project during a match between Jasper Troy and Drake. During the match, Lockwood interfered by body slamming Troy at ringside, allowing Drake to pin Troy. Later that night, Lockwood appeared backstage alongside The Vanity Project during a confrontation with Noam Dar and Romeo Moreno, further establishing her association with the group. Her debut was also covered by multiple wrestling media outlets, which noted her likeness to Chyna. Lockwood wrestled her first NXT match at Worlds Collide taped on September 26, where The Vanity Project (Lockwood, Brad Baylor and Ricky Smokes) and Mini Abismo Negro lost to the team of Adelicious, Mr. Iguana, La Parka, and Mascarita Sagrada in a Relevos Atómicos de Locura.
