= Trill Williams =

American football player (born 1999)

Profile
- Position: Safety

Personal information
- Born: December 29, 1999 (age 26); Yonkers, New York, U.S.
- Listed height: 6 ft 1 in (1.85 m)
- Listed weight: 202 lb (92 kg)

Career information
- High school: Archbishop Stepinac (White Plains, New York)
- College: Syracuse
- NFL draft: 2021: undrafted

Career history
- New Orleans Saints (2021)*; Miami Dolphins (2021–2022)
- * Offseason or practice squad member only
- Stats at Pro Football Reference
- Professional wrestling career
- Ring name(s): Trill London; Trill Williams
- Billed height: 6 ft 1 in (185 cm)
- Billed weight: 202 lb (92 kg)
- Trained by: WWE Performance Center; Michelle McCool
- Debut: 2025

Atrilleon Williams (born December 29, 1999) is an American professional wrestler and former professional football safety. As a professional wrestler, he is best known for his tenure in WWE, where he performed under the ring name Trill London.

== Early life ==
Williams attended Archbishop Stepinac High School in White Plains, New York. He played cornerback, running back and wide receiver in high school. As a senior, he was The Journal News Player of the Year. Williams committed to Syracuse University to play college football.

== Football career ==
Williams played at Syracuse from 2018 to 2020. He finished his career with 92 tackles, four interceptions and three touchdowns. After playing in the first five games his junior year in 2020, Williams sat out the rest of the season to prepare for the 2021 NFL draft.

Pre-draft measurables
Height	Weight	Arm length	Hand span	40-yard dash	10-yard split	20-yard split	20-yard shuttle	Three-cone drill	Vertical jump	Broad jump	Bench press
6 ft 0 3/8 in (1.84 m)	208 lb (94 kg)	31 1/8 in (0.79 m)	9 in (0.23 m)	4.57 s	1.56 s	2.64 s	4.27 s	7.17 s	36.0 in (0.91 m)	10 ft 3 in (3.12 m)	20 reps
All values from Pro Day

=== New Orleans Saints ===
After going undrafted, Williams signed with the New Orleans Saints as an undrafted free agent on May 11, 2021. He was waived three days later after failing his physical.

=== Miami Dolphins ===
On May 17, 2021, Williams was claimed off waivers by the Miami Dolphins. During the 2021 NFL season, he was active for five games. His first appearance was during the regular season finale victory over the New England Patriots in which he played on defense and special teams. He was placed on injured reserve with a torn ACL on August 15, 2022. He was waived on August 29, 2023.

== Professional wrestling career ==
On November 14, 2024, it was announced that Williams had signed a contract with WWE following a tryout. Williams was a part of the flurry of signings that WWE made following the announcement of the new WWE ID program. Williams, now under the ring name Trill London, wrestled his professional wrestling debut match on the premiere episode of Evolve on March 5, 2025, where he was defeated by Keanu Carver. On the April 1 episode of NXT, London made an appearance as a security guard during an in-ring brawl between Jordynne Grace and Jaida Parker, where he was tossed out of the ring by Grace. In June, London joined LFG season 2, where he was mentored by Michelle McCool. On April 24, 2026, London was released by WWE.
