= Arianna Grace =

Canadian-American professional wrestler (born 1995)

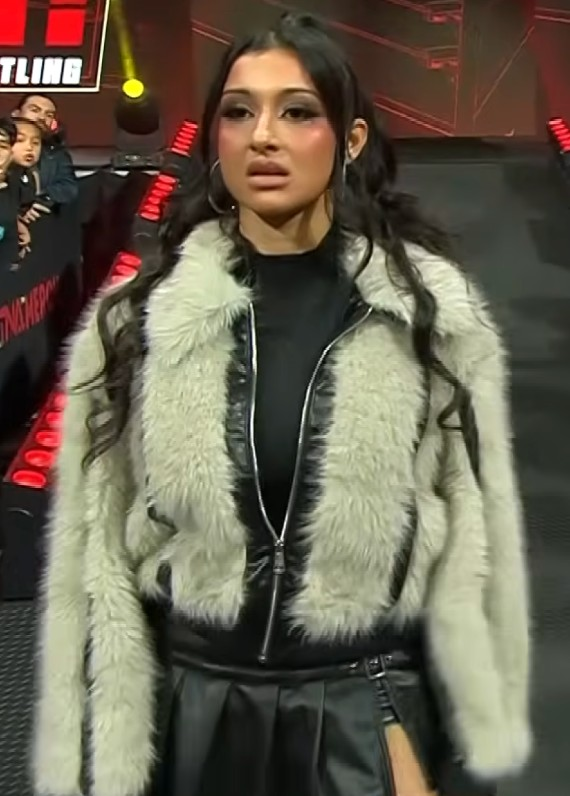

Personal information
- Born: Bianca Sophia Carelli; June 29, 1995 (age 31) Mississauga, Ontario, Canada
- Father: Santino Marella

Professional wrestling career
- Ring name(s): Arianna Grace; Bianca Carelli
- Billed height: 5 ft 7 in (1.70 m)
- Billed weight: 138 lb (63 kg)
- Billed from: Toronto, Ontario, Canada
- Trained by: Tyson Dux
- Debut: 2018

Bianca Sophia Carelli (born June 29, 1995) is a Canadian-American professional wrestler and beauty pageant competitor. She is signed to WWE, where she performs under the ring name Arianna Grace on the NXT brand and is a member of the BirthRight stable. She also appears in WWE partner promotion Total Nonstop Action Wrestling (TNA), where she is a former one-time TNA Knockouts World Champion.

A second-generation professional wrestler, Carelli is the daughter of Anthony Carelli, better known as Santino Marella.

== Early life ==
Bianca Carelli was born in Mississauga, Ontario, Canada to Petrina and professional wrestler Anthony Carelli, who is best known for his time in WWE as Santino Marella, and works for Total Nonstop Action Wrestling (TNA). At a young age, Carelli took part in live theater performances, improvisation competitions, competitive dance and beauty pageants. She won the Miss Teen Ontario-World pageant in 2013 at age 17 and she graduated from Western University in London, Ontario, Canada with a Bachelor's degree in biology. Carelli has extensive training in mixed martial arts (MMA), with focus on judo, jujutsu, Brazilian jiu-jitsu, and boxing. She also participated in field hockey and swimming during her school days.

== Professional wrestling career ==
=== National Wrestling Alliance (2018–2022) ===
Carelli began training in 2018 under independent wrestler Tyson Dux in Canada and she made her debut on June 9, 2018. At NWA EmPowerrr in 2021, Carelli competed in the NWA Women's Invitational Cup Gauntlet, which was won by Chelsea Green. She went on to compete on several independent shows in Florida before being signed by WWE in March 2022.

=== WWE (2022–present) ===
==== Debut; Miss NXT (2022–2025) ====
On March 17, 2022, it was announced that Carelli had signed with WWE where she would report to the NXT brand. On the April 29 episode of NXT Level Up, she made her debut under the ring name Arianna Grace where she defeated Amari Miller. She was soon announced as a participant in the first NXT Women's Breakout Tournament where she was defeated by Nikkita Lyons in the first round on the May 10 episode of NXT. On the August 10 episode of NXT, Grace earned her first televised win by defeating Thea Hail. In October, Grace suffered a torn ACL injury in a tag team match on LvL Up, which sidelined her for a year. Grace made her in-ring return on the September 29, 2023, episode of NXT Level Up losing to Fallon Henley. Now portraying a beauty pageant gimmick and calling herself "Miss NXT", Grace made her televised return in the second NXT Women's Breakout Tournament, the most appearances for any woman, in October where she defeated Brinley Reece in the first round but lost to Kelani Jordan in the semi-finals.

On the January 16, 2024, episode of NXT, Grace participated in an NXT Women's Championship #1 Contender's Battle Royal which was won by Roxanne Perez. On the March 12 episode of NXT, Grace faced Gigi Dolin with the stipulation that if Grace won, she will give Dolin a makeover to be a "proper lady". Grace defeated Dolin by disqualification after the referee caught Dolin giving a low blow to Grace. This was one of the first instances where a women's WWE match ended with a low blow disqualification. The angle was abruptly dropped after Dolin was reportedly sidelined in June after suffering a serious knee injury. On the June 25 episode of NXT, Grace fought Sol Ruca for an opportunity at the NXT Women's North American Championship at NXT Heatwave against Kelani Jordan but was defeated. The following week on NXT, after Karmen Petrovic challenged Jacy Jayne and Jazmyn Nyx to a tag team match at NXT Heatwave, NXT General Manager Ava assigned Grace as Petrovic's partner much to Petrovic's dismay. At the NXT Heatwave pre-show, Grace and Petrovic defeated Jayne and Nyx. After the match, Grace and Petrovic had a disagreement on who contributed to the match victory, to which Ava booked a match between them on that week's NXT, where Grace was defeated. In August, Grace has reportedly suffered an undisclosed injury. Grace made her on-screen return at NXT Vengeance Day on February 15, 2025 with her father, Santino Marella. On June 3 episode of NXT, Grace made her in-ring return against LFG winner Tyra Mae Steele.

==== BirthRight (2026–present) ====
In early 2026, Lexis King formed a new faction consisting of second generation WWE wrestlers called BirthRight and recruited Grace, Channing "Stacks" Lorenzo (with Grace being the daughter of Santino Marella and Stacks being Grace's fiancée), Uriah Conners (son of Fit Finlay), and Charlie Dempsey (son of William Regal). At the NXT Stand & Deliver countdown show on April 4, BirthRight teamed together for the first time where they lost to Hank and Tank, Shiloh Hill, EK Prosper, and Wren Sinclair in a 10-person mixed tag team match.

On June 23 episode of NXT, Grace defeated Izzi Dame in a finals match for the WWE Women's Speed Championship number one contenders tournament.

=== Total Nonstop Action Wrestling (2024–present) ===
On the September 5, 2024, episode of Impact!, Carelli, as Arianna Grace, made her Total Nonstop Action Wrestling (TNA) debut and announced that she will be the new liaison between NXT and TNA. At Victory Road on September 13, Grace appeared on-screen with her father, TNA's Director of Authority Santino Marella, for the first time in their career. On the May 29, 2025 episode of Impact!, Grace teamed with her father for the first time, where they lost to Robert Stone and Victoria Crawford in a mixed tag team match. At Against All Odds on June 6, Grace accompanied her father in his match victory against Stone for the TNA Director of Authority position. On February 13, 2026 at No Surrender, Grace defeated Léi Yǐng Lee to win the TNA Knockouts World Championship, making it the first title in Grace's career. On the March 5 episode of Impact!, Grace defeated Jody Threat in her first title defense. On March 27 at Sacrifice, Grace defeated Léi Yǐng Lee and Dani Luna in her second title defense, pinning the latter. On the April 2 episode of Impact!, Grace defeated Xia Brookside in another title defense. Nine days later, at Rebellion, she defeated Lee to secure her fourth title defense. She lost the title in a rematch against Lee at the April 15 tapings of Impact! that will air on tape delay.

== Personal life ==
Carelli is of Italian, Pakistani, Métis and Finnish descent. In 2023, she competed in the Miss Universe Canada beauty pageant where she finished in the top 20. On January 25, 2025 Carelli announced that she had become an American citizen. Carelli was engaged to fellow NXT Superstar, Channing "Stacks" Lorenzo. In 2026, it was revealed that she has an order of protection against ex-boyfriend and former NXT talent Keanu Carver.

== Championships and accomplishments ==
- Total Nonstop Action Wrestling
  - TNA Knockouts World Championship (1 time)
- WWE
  - WWE Women's Speed Championship #1 Contender’s Tournament (June 16 — June 23, 2026)
