= Shiloh Hill =

American professional wrestler (born 1999)

- Born: Thunder Justice Keck; January 30, 1999 (age 27); Mission Viejo, California, U.S.
- Professional wrestling career
- Ring name(s): Thunder Justice Keck; Shiloh Hill
- Trained by: WWE Performance Center; The Undertaker
- Debut: March 30, 2024
- Football career

Profile
- Position: Edge

Personal information
- Born: Mission Viejo, California, U.S.
- Listed height: 6 ft 3 in (1.91 m)
- Listed weight: 255 lb (116 kg)

Career information
- High school: Hotchkiss School
- College: Stanford Cardinal

Thunder Justice Keck (born January 30, 1999) is an American professional wrestler and former college football player. As a professional wrestler, he is signed to WWE, where he performs on the NXT brand under the ring name Shiloh Hill. Hill is the LFG Season 2 men's winner.

== Early and personal life ==
Keck was born in Mission Viejo, California, to parents Eric and Beth Wacome Keck. He was raised in Northfield, New Hampshire, with his siblings Zion, Darkness, Phoebe, and Zachri. He attended Winnisquam Regional Middle School and Winnisquam Regional High School, before receiving a full scholarship to the Hotchkiss School. He was an all-state hockey player, a Founders League champion in the discus, and placed third in the New England Championship for the 100 meter final, finishing second in the prelims to qualify for that final. Keck received a full scholarship to Stanford University, where he studied sustainability science and practice, computer science, and psychology. In a promo on week 1 of NXT Gold Rush, Keck revealed that he was able to complete online classes in record time despite truancy issues.

In March 2023, he had the highest name, image and likeness valuation of any Stanford athlete, being valued at $383,000. By October 2023, he was valued at $529,000.

His father played football at Saddleback College and Columbia University, and was a captain of the Columbia Lions. On July 8, 2020, his father Eric died suddenly of a heart attack at his home in Northfield.

== College football career ==
Keck played only six games of high school football prior to college and joined the Stanford Cardinal in 2017. He played from 2018 until 2022. He was an outside linebacker until his fifth year. Keck was a staple of the Cardinal special teams units playing on kickoff, KOR, punt, punt return, and field goal block. He was known for his physicality, speed, and effort on special teams under Coach Alamar and eventually earned playing time as situational third down player on the Cardinal defense. Then, in 2020, Keck earned the starting spot at outside linebacker and was also listed as a backup inside linebacker. The Cardinal's season was cut short due to the pandemic but Keck finished with 17 tackles, 1 TFL, 3 PBUs, and 5 QB hurries, in 5 games. While in his sixth year in 2022, he became an edge rusher but sustained an injury in the first game, so he did not compete for the rest of the season. He had 27 tackles, 4 PBUs, 2 TFLs, 2 forced fumbles, and 1 fumble recovery throughout his football career.

== Professional wrestling career ==
=== WWE (2022–present) ===
On June 13, 2022, Keck was named as one of 15 college athletes to have signed to the WWE's second class of their Next in Line program, which he found through a social media consultant at his school. On March 30, 2024, he made his in-ring debut under his real name at an NXT live event, in a losing effort against Drake Morreaux. Three months later on the June 6 episode of NXT Level Up, Keck made his on-screen debut under the ring name Shiloh Hill, teaming with Jasper Troy in a tag team match losing to The D'Angelo Family (Channing "Stacks" Lorenzo and Tony D'Angelo). On the June 21 episode of NXT Level Up, Hill picked up his first victory against Uriah Connors.

In February 2025, Hill participated in the first season of LFG (Legends & Future Greats), a reality television series involving "rising talents" competing for a NXT contract. He was mentored by The Undertaker and was the runner-up. On the May 6 episode of NXT, Hill made his NXT debut where he participated in the 25-man battle royal to become the #1 contender for the NXT Championship at NXT Battleground but was eliminated by Trick Williams. Hill returned to LFG Season 2 and was again mentored by The Undertaker. He won season 2 after beating Harlem Lewis in the finals and is signed to the NXT brand. After a series of promos explaining his childhood and upbringing, he made his NXT singles match debut on December 9, 2025 and defeated Lexis King as a face. On December 23 episode of NXT, he teamed up with the female winner of LFG season 2, Skylar Raye, in a mixed tornado tag "Christmas Chaos" street fight to defeat Channing "Stacks" Lorenzo and Arianna Grace. Hill made his main roster debut on the April 17, 2026 episode of SmackDown, where participated in the 2026 André the Giant Memorial Battle Royal.

On June 9, 2026, Hill defeated Tristan Angels in a pageant to be named the first-ever "Mr. NXT".

On November 17, 2026, Hill was announced as a participant in the John Cena Classic in a backstage segment of NXT.

== Championships and accomplishments ==
- Pro Wrestling Illustrated
  - Ranked No. 289 of the top singles wrestlers in the PWI 500 in 2026
- WWE
  - Men’s LFG Season 2 winner
