= Santino Marella =

Canadian professional wrestler (born 1974)

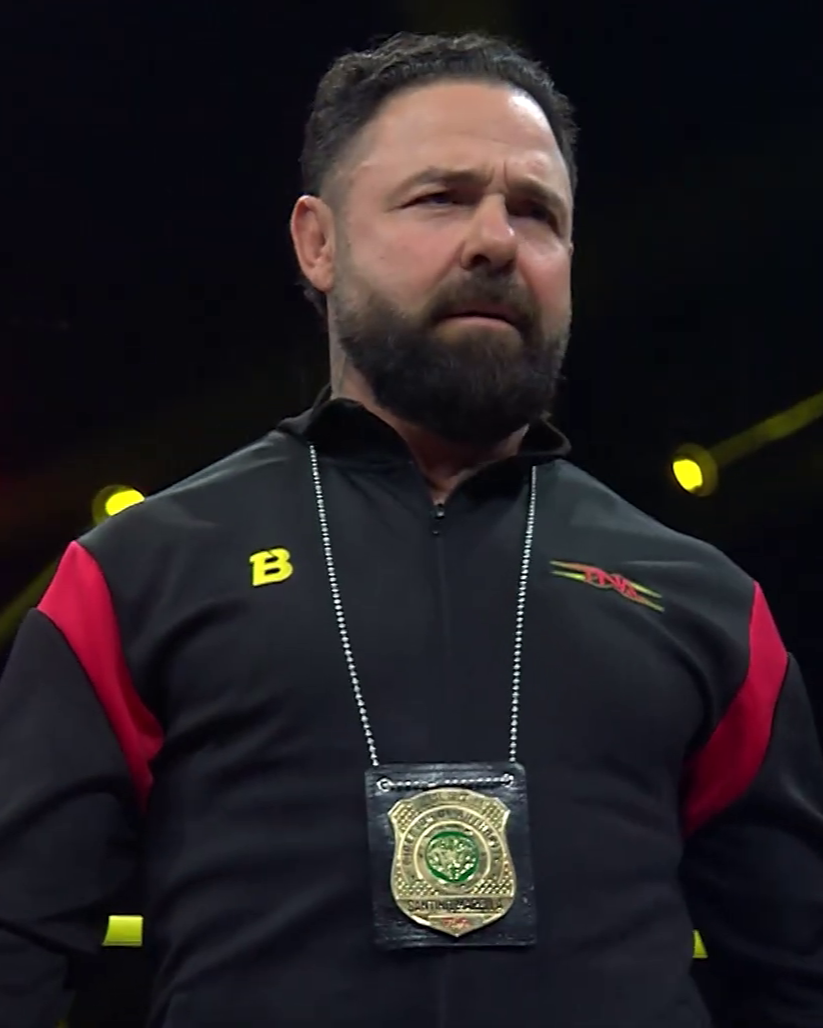
- Marella in 2026

Personal information
- Born: Anthony Carelli; March 14, 1974 (age 52) Mississauga, Ontario, Canada
- Education: Concordia University
- Spouse: Anna Babij (m. 2015)
- Children: 3, including Arianna Grace
- Website: www.battleartsacademy.ca

Professional wrestling career
- Ring name(s): Anthony Carelli; Boris Alexiev; Johnny Geo Basco; Santina Marella; Santino Marella; Sam Teamo
- Billed height: 6 ft 0 in (183 cm)
- Billed weight: 233 lb (106 kg)
- Billed from: San Fili, Calabria, Italy
- Trained by: Ohio Valley Wrestling
- Debut: March 2, 2003

Anthony Carelli (born March 14, 1974), better known by his ring name Santino Marella, is a Canadian professional wrestler. He is signed to Total Nonstop Action Wrestling (TNA), where he works as the on-screen director of authority. Carelli also appears sporadically in partner promotion WWE, on its NXT brand. He is the founder of and instructor at Battle Arts Academy, a martial arts and professional wrestling training facility in Mississauga, Ontario, and the official ambassador of Judo Canada. In addition to being signed to TNA, he also works with various professional wrestling promotions in the independent circuit including Joe Cazana Promotions, Great Lakes Championship Wrestling (GLCW), and Maple Leaf Pro Wrestling (MLP).

He is best known for his 11-year tenure with WWE. Carelli made his WWE debut during a live episode of Raw from Milan, Italy. Under the character of Santino Marella, a fan selected from the audience, he defeated the Intercontinental Champion Umaga, winning the title in his debut match. During the following years, he would win the Intercontinental title one more time, the United States Championship once and the WWE Tag Team Championship once. He was also involved in a storyline where he worked as Santina Marella, Santino's twin sister. Carelli was released from WWE in 2016. After his WWE departure, he opened Battle Arts Academy and worked for Impact Wrestling under his real name. In 2017, he made sporadic matches on the independent circuit, as well as occasional appearances in WWE. In 2023, Carelli made his return to Impact, now under the TNA banner and performing under the Santino Marella name and gimmick. In 2025, with WWE and TNA having a partnership between the two promotions, Carelli returned to WWE on its NXT brand.

Carelli is known for his humorous gimmick as Santino Marella, an Italian stereotype, often being involved in comedic segments, having several on-screen relationships with fellow wrestlers, as well as being crowned "Miss WrestleMania" at WrestleMania XXV disguised as "Santina Marella". The Santino Marella character was awarded Best Gimmick in 2007 and 2008 by the Wrestling Observer Newsletter.

== Early life ==
Anthony Carelli was born on March 14, 1974 in Mississauga, Ontario, Canada. He is of Italian and Métis descent. His paternal family emigrated from San Fili (in province of Cosenza), Calabria to Canada. Carelli attended St Basil's Catholic Elementary School, and later Philip Pocock Catholic Secondary School and Concordia University. He trained in judo at the age of nine and also competed in high school wrestling, winning the Region of Peel Secondary School Athletic Association (ROPSSAA) Tournament, back-to-back as a junior and a senior.

== Professional wrestling career ==
=== Independent circuit (2002–2005) ===
Anthony Carelli started his career on the Ontario independent circuit as Johnny Geo Basco, debuting with a disqualification win over Xhibit in the opening match of a Ring Wars show in Orangeville, Ontario, on August 17, 2002. In the second half of 2004, Carelli wrestled four matches for Battlarts in Japan, as Johnny Geo Basco. By this time he also competed in mixed martial arts, in which he claimed in 2006 to have a 6–1 record, although only one fight is confirmed.

=== World Wrestling Entertainment/WWE ===
==== Ohio Valley Wrestling (2005–2007) ====
In 2005, Anthony Carelli (as Johnny Geo Basco) began training at Ohio Valley Wrestling (OVW), a developmental territory for World Wrestling Entertainment (WWE). At an OVW television taping In July, during a storyline where he was supposed to act afraid of The Boogeyman, but instead laughed, Anthony Carelli was shouted at and slapped by Jim Cornette, OVW's head booker and co-owner. This incident led to Cornette being fired as OVW booker by WWE.

Under OVW's new booker, Paul Heyman, Anthony Carelli adopted the gimmick of Boris Alexiev, a Russian shootfighter/mixed martial artist. On October 29, he lost his debut OVW match, teaming with Aaron Stevens against Chet the Jet and Chris Cage. Alexiev made his TV debut on April 12, 2006, managed by his "comrade", Mr. Strongko and defeating Mo Sexton. He was booked to dominate opponents with stiff strikes and submission style wrestling. He had a 10-second win over a wrestler named Dewey. He signed a developmental contract with WWE on August 11, 2006, and continued training in OVW.

On January 24, 2007, Alexiev won the OVW Television Championship from Mike Kruel, who was defending in place of champion Eddie Kraven. He lost it back to Kruel on February 7, and regained it from him on March 14. Three days later, he dropped it to Shawn Spears. He was called up to the WWE roster a month later.

==== Intercontinental Champion (2007–2009) ====
Anthony Carelli debuted as Santino Marella (an homage to WWE Hall of Famer Robert "Gorilla Monsoon" Marella) on the April 16, 2007 episode of Raw from Milan, Italy. He was presented as a fan that Vince McMahon selected as an opponent for Umaga. The unknown Marella scored a surprising upset, and won the WWE Intercontinental Championship with an assist from Bobby Lashley. The next day, WWE.com posted a profile on Marella, saying he was an Italian national who moved to Canada as a child and returned to his native country a few times each year to visit family. The profile claimed that he moved to the United States to pursue a wrestling career with WWE. Shortly after winning the Intercontinental title, Marella feuded with Chris Masters, narrowly retaining the title in his first defenses. On July 2, he dropped the title to Umaga, after defeating him on June 24, at Vengeance: Night of Champions, by disqualification.

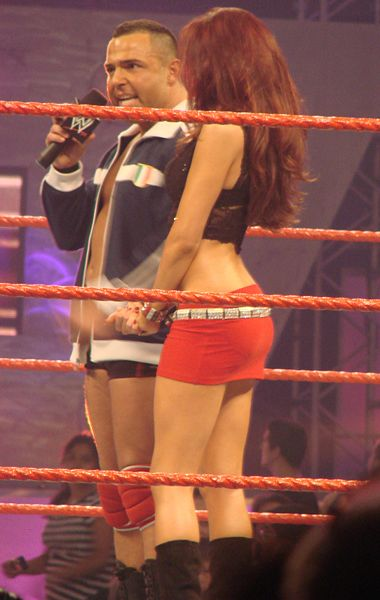
Marella with his kayfabe girlfriend Maria in September 2007

Marella then began a gradual heel turn and became increasingly jealous of his girlfriend, Maria. Over several weeks, they appeared together in a series of segments on Raw, including two "game show" skits, hosted by General Manager William Regal, which resulted in retired wrestler Ron Simmons winning a date with Maria, to Santino's dismay. Marella began a publicity campaign against the WWE Films production, The Condemned, as its DVD release neared. He was eventually confronted by the film's star, Steve Austin, who argued the film's merits before delivering a Stone Cold Stunner to Marella and hosing him and Maria with beer. During the Austin angle, Marella repeatedly mocked him and his catchphrases in humorously broken English, starting a new comedic trend in his gimmick. After a short angle with Jerry Lawler, which included Lawler hitting his signature fist drop maneuver after Marella lost a match to the returning Chris Jericho on the November 26 episode of Raw, Marella formed a tag team with Carlito.

Around this time, Maria was offered a photo shoot for Playboy magazine. After unsuccessfully persuading her to decline it, Marella tried to sabotage the cover unveiling (an in-ring segment of Raw), causing Maria to dump him. The next night on Raw, during one of Maria's bikini shows, Santino challenged Maria while she was wearing a pink bikini. However, no matter what he tried, she always countered perfectly, taunting him after each counter. Maria performed a body slam, suplex and leg drop on Santino. One of the more memorable moments of the match was when Maria slapped her behind and told Santino, "Kiss my behind, baby." before tossing him into the corner and doing a Stink Face on him. Throughout the entire match, Maria was smiling and laughing as she dominated Santino with ease. Eventually, Maria overwhelmed him with her lips and kiss, which counted as a submission hold. Maria continued to kiss Santino until he tapped out, but even after that, she continued to kiss him, intending to fully humiliate him.

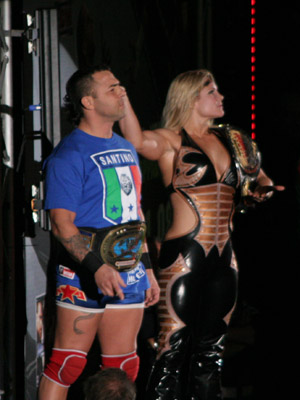
Marella as Intercontinental Champion with then-partner Beth Phoenix in late 2008

On the July 14, 2008 episode of Raw, Marella lost to Beth Phoenix, who had answered his open challenge. On the next episode, after he lost another open challenge to the returning D'Lo Brown, Marella and Phoenix kissed, both looking confused afterward. Over the next few weeks, they became a parody of a "power couple", soon called "Glamarella" (a portmanteau of Phoenix's nickname, "Glamazon", and "Marella"). At SummerSlam, they wrestled Intercontinental champion Kofi Kingston and WWE Women's Champion Mickie James in a mixed-tag match with both titles on the line. Phoenix pinned James after hitting her finisher, the Glam Slam, giving Marella his second Intercontinental championship. Marella then sought to become the "greatest Intercontinental champion of all the times" by beating The Honky Tonk Man's record 64-week reign. Over the weeks, a "Honk-A-Meter" graphic informed viewers of his progress during his matches and segments (at one point Marella even used a "Honk-a-Perfect-Mountie-Meter" comparing his reign to the combination of The Honky Tonk Man, Mr Perfect and The Mountie's reigns). At Cyber Sunday, Marella was disqualified in a title match with The Honky Tonk Man (who fans voted for over other former champions Roddy Piper and Goldust). On the November 10 episode of Raw, after a reign of twelve weeks and one day, Marella lost the title to William Regal.

In January 2009, Marella entered the Royal Rumble, at #28. He was eliminated by Kane after (officially) 1.9 seconds, breaking The Warlord's 1989 record for shortest Royal Rumble appearance by a tenth of a second. Marella's humour proved popular with audiences, and he turned face again before WrestleMania 25, expressing his desire to be crowned the inaugural "Miss WrestleMania" in a 25-woman battle royale at the event. He challenged Mickie James to a match with one arm tied behind his back, with a battle royal spot on the line, but he lost. The next week, in order to "prove" his eligibility, he revealed he was wearing a mankini. Instead, he was attacked by most of the female roster. Nevertheless, at WrestleMania, he won the battle royal, competing in drag as Santina Marella (Santino Marella's self-alleged twin sister), last eliminating Beth Phoenix and Melina. Marella successfully defended the Miss Wrestlemania title against Phoenix at Backlash in three seconds, with help from The Great Khali. On the May 18 Raw, Marella lost the title to Vickie Guerrero, and won it back on June 7, at Extreme Rules, by defeating Vickie and Chavo Guerrero Jr. in a handicap hog pen match. On the June 22 Raw, Raw's new owner, Donald Trump, fired Santina and the Miss WrestleMania title was abandoned.

==== Teaming with Vladimir Kozlov (2010–2011) ====
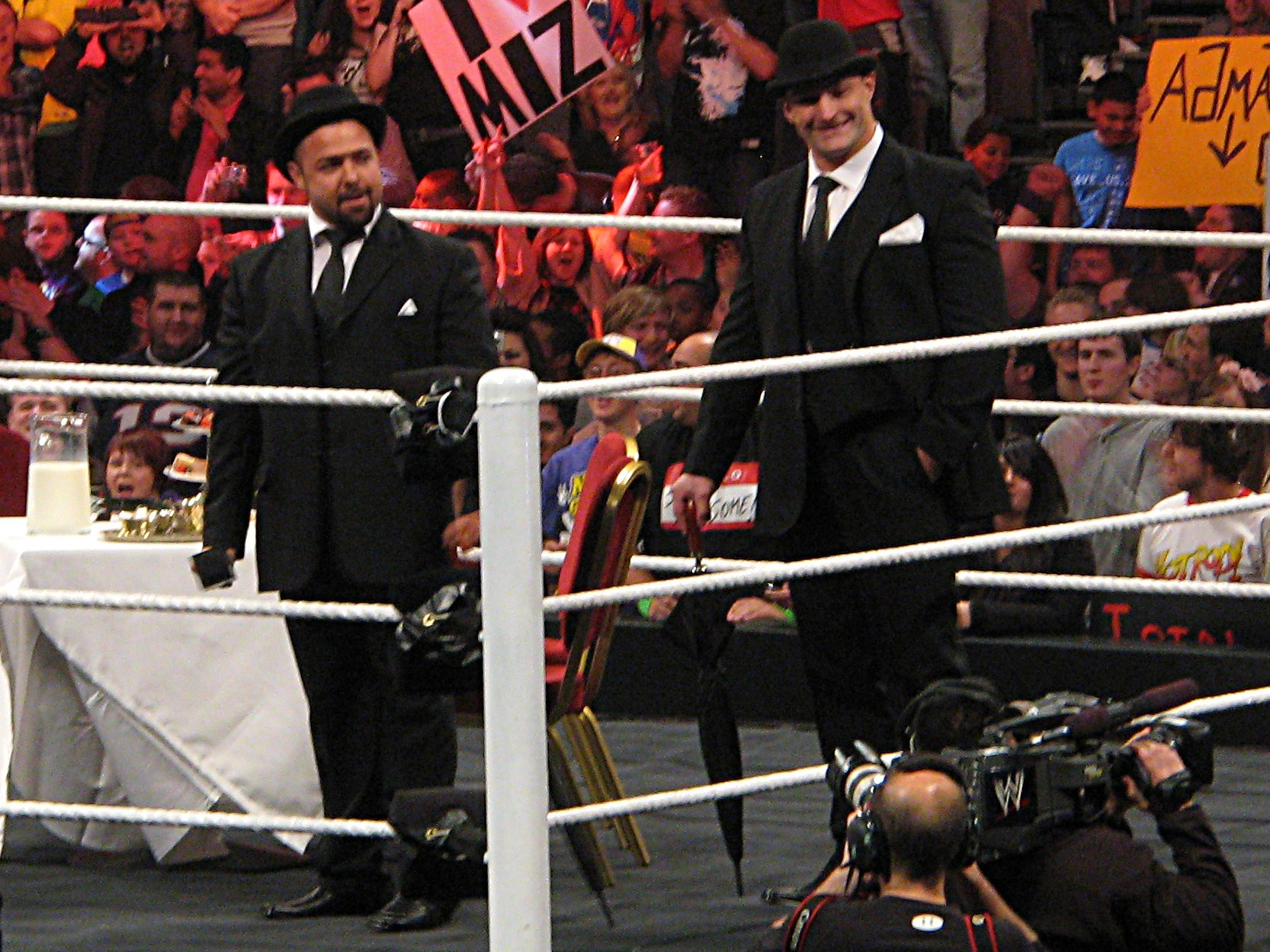
Marella and Kozlov in November 2010 on Raw in Manchester, England

At WrestleMania XXVI, Santino Marella competed in the 26-man battle royale dark match, won by Yoshi Tatsu. He then tried to form a tag team with Vladimir Kozlov, who repeatedly refused the offer. On the May 31 episode of Raw, Kozlov interfered in Marella's match, helping him win. On the July 19 Raw, they finally teamed to defeat William Regal and Zack Ryder. At Night of Champions, Marella and Kozlov wrestled a Tag Team Turmoil match for the Unified Tag Team Championship, won by Cody Rhodes and Drew McIntyre.

On the October 11 Raw, he defeated Zack Ryder to qualify for Team Raw at Bragging Rights, against Team SmackDown. He was the first of seven Team Raw members eliminated, pinned by Tyler Reks. On the October 25 Raw, after Sheamus had called him an "embarrassment" for being the first man eliminated at Bragging Rights, Marella scored an upset victory over the former two-time WWE Champion. They wrestled twice more, both matches ending with John Morrison saving Marella from Sheamus' post-match assault.

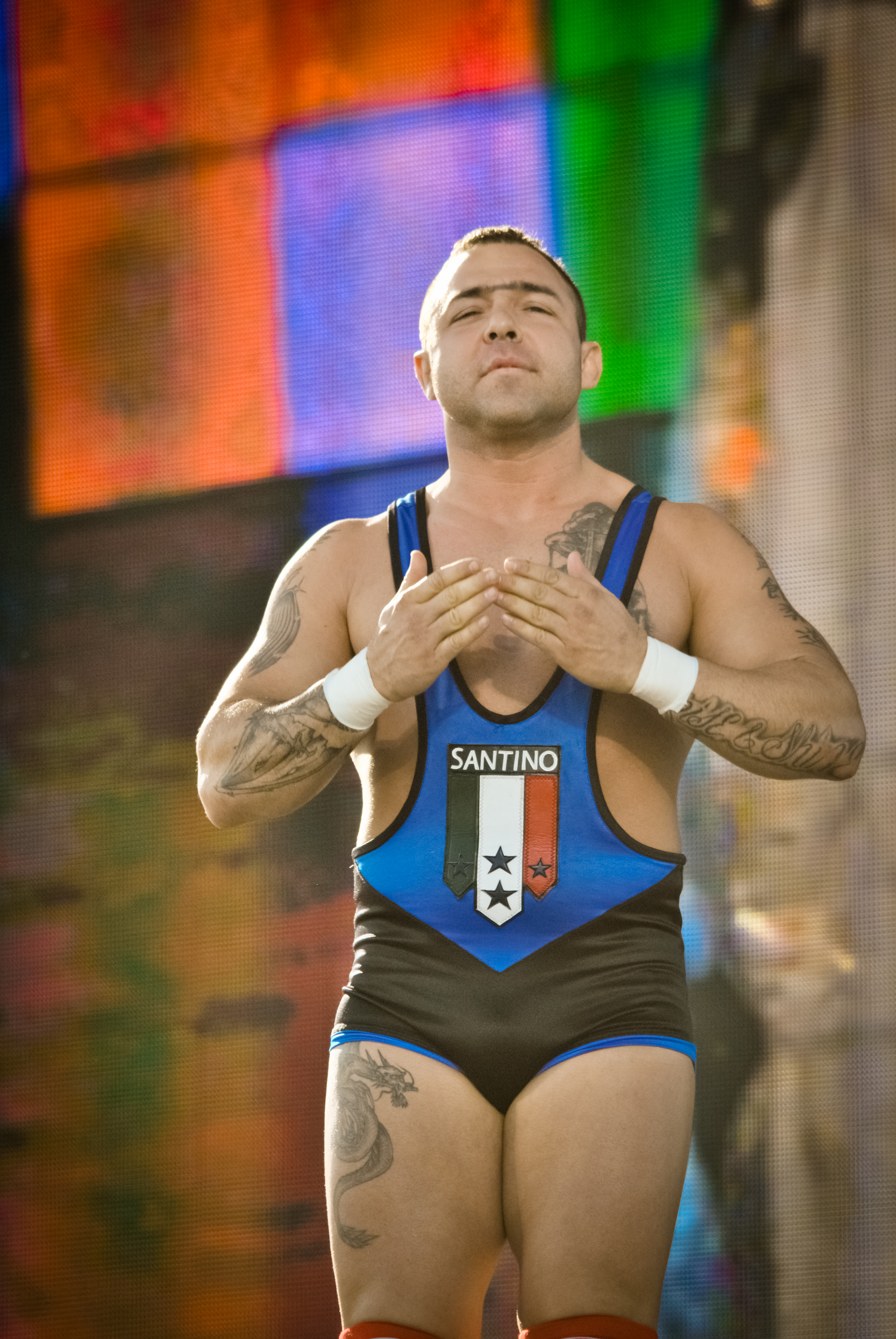
Marella at Tribute to the Troops 2010

On the November 15 Raw, Marella and Kozlov became number one contenders for the WWE Tag Team Championship by defeating The Usos. They unsuccessfully challenged The Nexus (Justin Gabriel and Heath Slater) for the title at Survivor Series. They won the Tag Team Championship in a four-way elimination tag match on the December 6 Raw, beating The Nexus, The Usos and Mark Henry and Yoshi Tatsu, after John Cena distracted Gabriel, allowing Marella to hit his Cobra finisher. After celebrating in the ring, Tamina kissed Santino, starting a relationship between them. She began accompanying Marella to his matches. Marella and Kozlov retained the Tag Team title at TLC: Tables, Ladders & Chairs, when Gabriel and Slater were disqualified after interference from Nexus member Michael McGillicutty. The next night on Raw, Marella and Tamina beat Ted DiBiase Jr. and Maryse in a mixed-tag match. On January 30, 2011, Marella entered the Royal Rumble at number 37. He was one of the final two wrestlers, before being eliminated by Alberto Del Rio. At Elimination Chamber, Marella and Kozlov lost the Tag Team title to Gabriel and Slater. At WrestleMania XXVII, Marella teamed with Big Show, Kane, and Kofi Kingston (replacing the injured Kozlov) to defeat The Corre (Slater, Gabriel, Ezekiel Jackson and Wade Barrett) in an eight-man tag match. Marella's relationship with Tamina ended when she was drafted to SmackDown. On August 5, Kozlov was released from WWE, ending the team.

==== United States Champion (2011–2012) ====
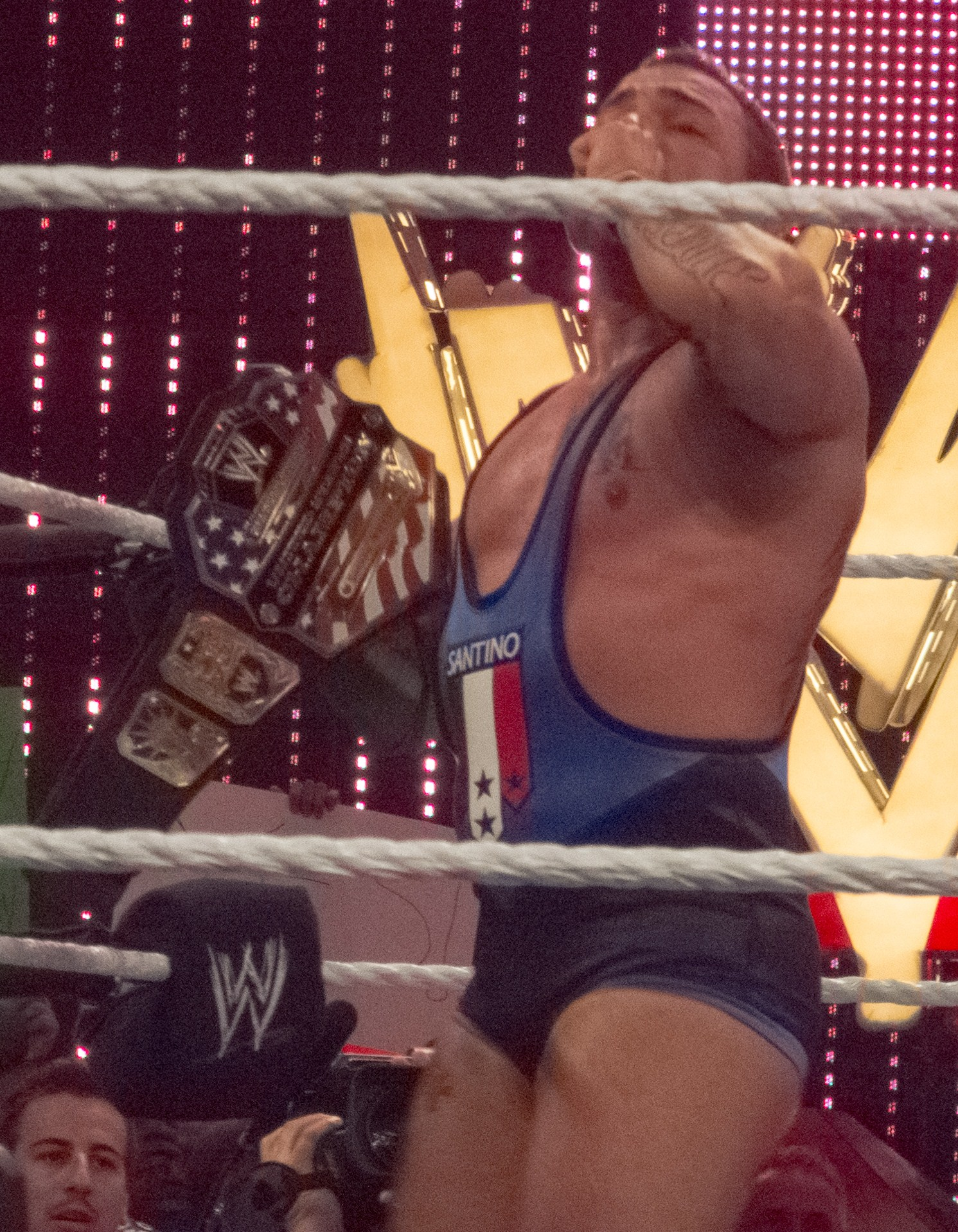
Santino Marella with the WWE United States Championship belt

Marella began teaming with Zack Ryder on the July 21 Superstars, beating Tag Team Champions David Otunga and Michael McGillicutty in a non-title match. On the August 1 Raw, Otunga and McGillicutty won the rematch. On September 1, Carelli injured his left shoulder in a car accident before a house show in Puerto Rico, rendering him inactive for several weeks. Marella returned on the October 3 Raw, defeating Jinder Mahal. On the October 31 episode, Marella defeated Jack Swagger with a roll-up pin after he spit water given to him by special guest, Beaker of The Muppets, in Swagger's face. The following Raw, Swagger defeated Marella by submission. On the January 6, 2012 episode of SmackDown, Marella defeated Drew McIntyre to become Smackdown General Manager Theodore Long's assistant. Marella teamed with Yoshi Tatsu on the January 27 SmackDown and "Hacksaw" Jim Duggan on the February 3 episode to face Tag Team Champions Primo & Epico, losing both times. On the February 17 SmackDown, Marella won a battle royal to replace Randy Orton in the Elimination Chamber match for the World Heavyweight Championship at Elimination Chamber. At Elimination Chamber, he was the last man eliminated by Daniel Bryan.

On the March 5 Raw, Marella defeated Jack Swagger to win the United States Championship. On the following episode of SmackDown, Marella successfully defended the title against Swagger in a steel cage match, by escaping through the cage door. At WrestleMania XXVIII on April 1, Marella was the team captain of Team Teddy, which lost to Team Johnny, after interference from Eve. The following night on Raw, Marella successfully defended the title against Swagger and Dolph Ziggler in a Triple Threat Match, and against David Otunga on the April 16 episode. In the pre-show of Extreme Rules on April 23, Marella defeated The Miz to retain the United States Championship. The following night on Raw, Marella unsuccessfully tried to earn a WWE Championship match at Over the Limit in a Beat the Clock Challenge against The Miz. Later that month, Marella briefly reunited with Zack Ryder, facing teams including Primo and Epico, Curt Hawkins and Tyler Reks and Titus O'Neil and Darren Young. Marella then feuded with Alberto Del Rio's ring announcer Ricardo Rodriguez, leading to a non-title Tuxedo match on June 17 at No Way Out, which Marella won. On the June 25 Raw, Marella successfully defended the United States Championship against Jack Swagger. Four days later on SmackDown, he and Intercontinental Champion Christian defeated David Otunga and Cody Rhodes to qualify for the World Heavyweight Championship Money in the Bank ladder match at Money in the Bank, which was won by Dolph Ziggler. On the July 27 and August 3 episodes of SmackDown, Marella lost to Antonio Cesaro in non-title matches. On August 19, on the SummerSlam pre-show, Marella lost the United States Championship to Cesaro. Marella lost his rematch for the title on the September 3 episode of Raw. On the September 21 episode of SmackDown, Marella defeated Cesaro in a non-title match to earn another shot at the United States Championship. The title rematch took place the following week on SmackDown, where Marella failed in his title challenge.

On the debut episode of WWE Main Event on October 3, Marella and Zack Ryder entered a Tag Team Championship tournament, and defeated Justin Gabriel and Tyson Kidd in the quarterfinals. The following week on Raw, they were eliminated in the semifinals by eventual winners Team Rhodes Scholars (Cody Rhodes and Damien Sandow). After this loss Marella and Ryder began a feud with 3MB's members (Heath Slater, Drew McIntyre and Jinder Mahal) which culminated in the Pre-show of Survivor Series, in which Slater and Mahal defeated them. On the December 26 episode of Main Event, Santino Marella participated in a 20-man battle royal for the number one contender of Cesaro's United States title and split from his partner Zack Ryder, when eliminated him. Successively Marella was eliminated by Wade Barrett from the battle-royal. Marella then took a leave of absence due to a neck injury.

==== Final storylines (2013–2016) ====
Marella returned on January 27, 2013, at the Royal Rumble, entering the Royal Rumble match at number 5 before being the first man eliminated by Cody Rhodes. After a two-month absence, Marella returned to Raw on the April 1 episode, losing to Mark Henry. Marella returned on the September 9 episode of Raw, defeating Antonio Cesaro. Marella then began a feud with The Real Americans (Cesaro and Jack Swagger), then Marella began to align himself with The Great Khali and Hornswoggle in this feud. He defeated Swagger on the September 20 episode of SmackDown and he defeated Cesaro on the September 30 episode of Raw. On October 6 at Battleground, Marella and Khali were defeated by Cesaro and Swagger in a tag team match. They were defeated again by The Real Americans on the following episode of Raw, ending their feud.

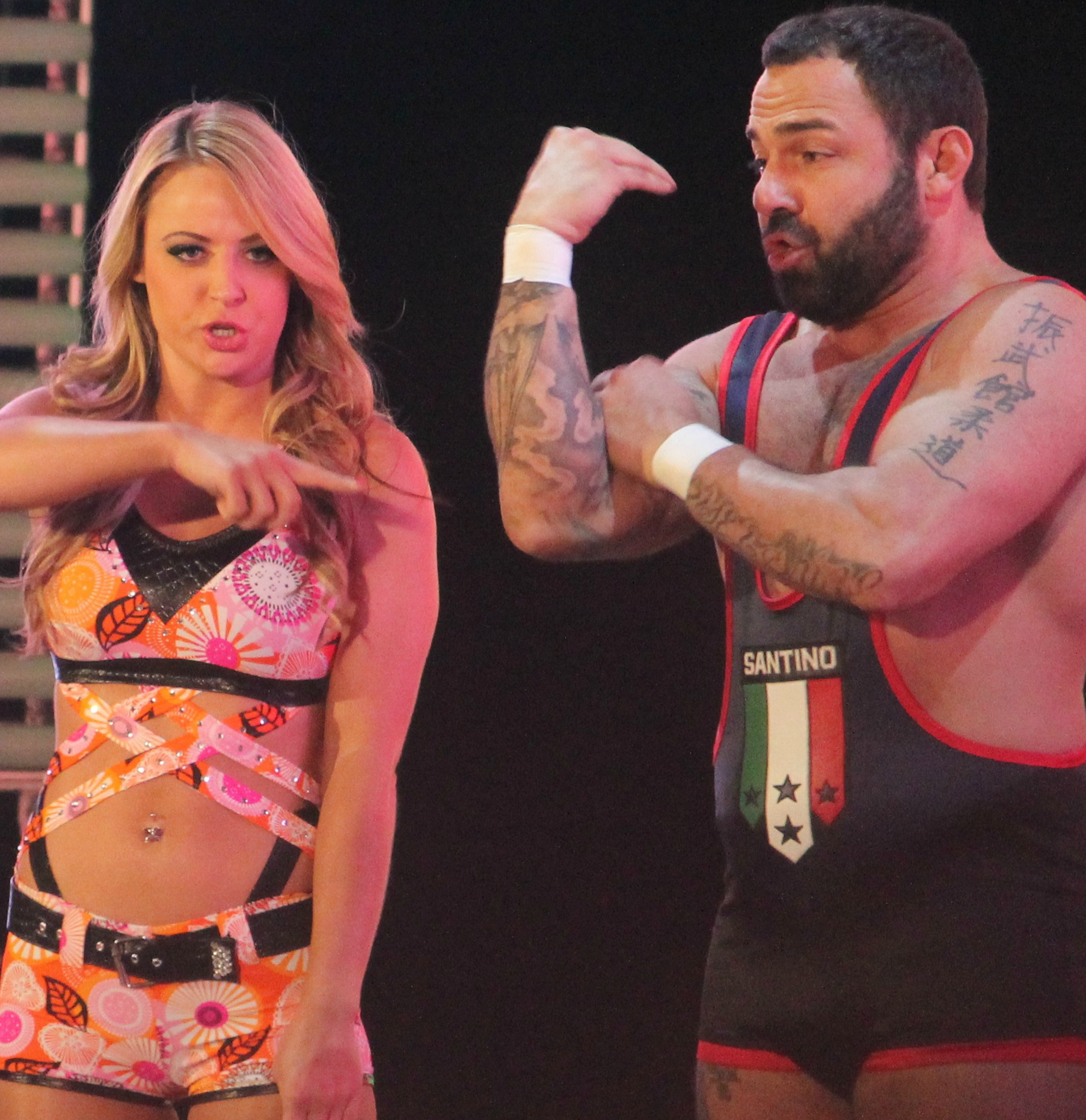
Marella and Emma before a match on Raw in April 2014

On the February 3, 2014 episode of Raw, Marella returned to television and invited Emma into the ring from the crowd to have a "dance-off" with Summer Rae, starting a feud with her and Fandango. Emma would go on to win the dance competition against Rae the February 21 episode of SmackDown. At WrestleMania XXX, Marella participated in the André the Giant Memorial Battle Royal and eliminating The Miz, before being eliminated by Alberto Del Rio. The following night on Raw, Marella and Emma defeated Fandango and Rae in a mixed match to end their feud. On the May 5 episode of Raw, Marella participated in a 20-man battle royal for Dean Ambrose's United States Championship, but he was eliminated by RybAxel (Ryback and Curtis Axel). On the June 17 episode of Main Event, Marella was defeated by Rusev in what would be his final match in WWE until 2020.

After a third neck injury, Marella declared his retirement on July 6 at a house show in Toronto, Ontario. On September 16, 2014, Marella underwent successful surgery on his neck. Marella made several appearances throughout 2014 and 2015, including one appearance on the November 24 episode of Raw to promote his new movie, Jingle All the Way 2 with co-star Larry the Cable Guy, serving as the Guest General Manager for the December 5 episode of SmackDown and hosted his own Royal Rumble lottery on the 20 January, exclusively on the WWE Network. Marella made his return to WWE television on the December 21 episode of Raw to present an award at the Slammy Awards. The next night, on Super SmackDown, Marella appeared in a backstage segment. On May 6, 2016, Carelli was released from WWE along with seven other superstars; the reason was due to an injury.

==== Sporadic appearances (2019–2020) ====
On July 22, 2019, Marella appeared at the Raw Reunion show in a backstage skit. Marella would make a surprise appearance during the 2020 women's Royal Rumble match under his character of Santina Marella, where he entered at 29, becoming the first male to enter a Women's Royal Rumble match before he eliminated himself via "The Cobra" after being startled and intimidated by Natalya and Beth Phoenix.

=== Return to independent circuit (2017–present) ===
On June 17, 2017, Marella announced that he would come out of retirement for one last match for Destiny World Wrestling, which operates out of his Battle Arts Academy facilities, on August 27. Marella had announced that he would be teaming up with Alberto El Patrón against RJ City and Stone Rockwell. In light of El Patron's legal troubles, he was announced to be replaced in the match by Chavo Guerrero Jr. After the match, Marella formally announced the end of his in-ring career.

In July 2019, Marella returned to the ring at a Battle Arts Academy show, wrestling in an MMA inspired gimmick. On September 14, 2019, he appeared live in Josh Barnett's Bloodsport II as himself, Anthony Carelli.

=== Impact Wrestling / Total Nonstop Action Wrestling (2017–2019; 2022–present) ===
On November 5, 2017, Carelli appeared in the audience for Impact Wrestling's Bound for Glory event. Carelli, still collaborating with Impact Wrestling, co-hosted Behind the Lights program on Twitch. On July 23, 2018, he appeared at an Impact Wrestling television taping in the corner of Dustin Quicksilver (representing his Battle Arts Academy). Quicksilver lost to Austin Aries after Carelli threw in the towel on his behalf. Following this, he got in a confrontation with Aries, resulting in Carelli hitting Aries with a low blow.

On March 5, 2022, Carelli returned to Impact Wrestling for their Sacrifice event, doing commentary alongside Tom Hannifan and Matthew Rehwoldt for the Impact World Championship main event between Moose and Heath. On January 13, 2023, at Hard to Kill, Carelli made his return under his previous ring name Santino Marella, performing as the on-screen Impact Director of Authority. On the April 6 episode of Impact!, Marella was mysteriously attacked backstage. With Sami Callihan being suspected behind the attack as part of his initiation into The Design, Marella teamed up with Dirty Dango and Impact Digital Media Champion Joe Hendry on April 16, at Rebellion, to face and ultimately defeat the Design. On the May 18 episode of Impact!, it was revealed that Dango was Marella's assailant.

At Victory Road September 13, 2024, Marella appeared on-screen with his daughter, the NXT and the now renamed Total Nonstop Action Wrestling (TNA) liaison Arianna Grace, for the first time in their career. On the May 29, 2025 episode of Impact!, Marella teamed with Grace for the first time, where they lost to Robert Stone and Victoria Crawford in a mixed tag team match. At Against All Odds on June 6, Grace accompanied Marella in his match victory against Stone for the TNA Director of Authority position in Grace's final appearance for TNA.

=== Return to WWE (2025) ===
At NXT Vengeance Day on February 15, 2025, Marella made his on-screen return to WWE as the TNA Director of Authority in a segment with NXT General Manager Ava, and again on May 27th to announce a title match between Mike Santana and new TNA World Champion, Trick Williams. On the July 22, 2025 episode of NXT, Marella interrupted a promo by NXT North American Champion Ethan Page to announce that he would challenge Page for the North American Championship the following week. On July 29, Marella wrestled his first WWE match in 11 years under the Santino Marella character against Ethan Page, but was unsuccessful in winning the title.

== Other endeavors ==
Early in his professional wrestling career, Carelli trained and wrestled at the original Battlarts in Japan. He, along with kung fu practitioner Steven J. Wong and fitness magazine publisher Terry Frendo, opened a 15,000 square foot multi-use facility and gym in Mississauga, Ontario called 'Battle Arts Academy' in September 2013. It is for general strength and conditioning, as well as for training in mixed martial arts and professional wrestling taught by the original Battlarts founder, Yuki Ishikawa. In 2015, Carelli trained athletes from Venezuela for the Panamerican Games 2015.

In 2014, Carelli and his partner Dan Garneau founded and sponsored Canadian junior ice hockey team, Milton Battle Arts Cobras. The team was part of World United Hockey League.

In November 2016, Carelli joined the Sportsnet 360 Aftermath panel as an analyst. On May 2, 2018, Carelli debuted the weekly show Behind the Lights, alongside co-host, Destiny World Wrestling owner George Iceman on the official Impact Wrestling Twitch channel.

Being a Shodan for more than 30 years, Carelli is the judo instructor in Battle Arts Academy. Aside from being a commentator for the International Judo Federation, he was named Judo Canada's first official ambassador in November 2019.

== Personal life ==
Carelli has a daughter from his previous marriage to Petrina, Bianca, who works as professional wrestler under the ring name Arianna Grace. Carelli married bikini fitness competitor Anna Babij, in November 2015. Carelli is a member of the Métis Nation of Ontario.

Carelli has had multiple neck surgeries in his career. The disc at his L4 and L5 is also very thin.

== Championships and accomplishments ==
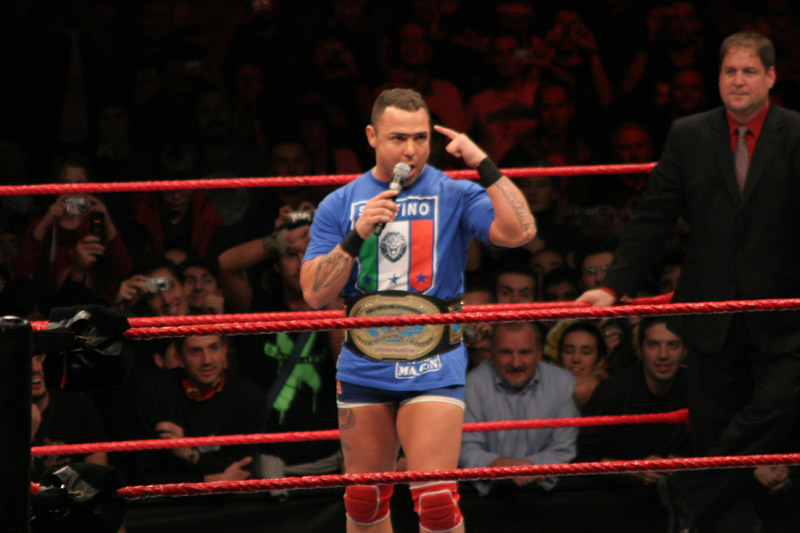
Marella is a two-time Intercontinental Champion...

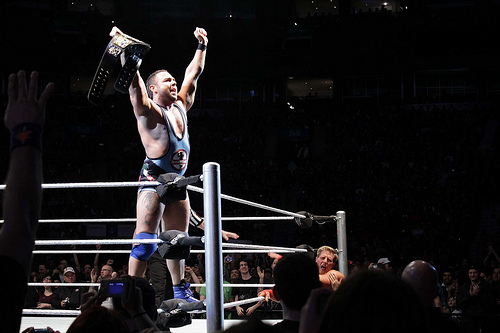
...and a one-time United States Champion

=== Judo ===
- Ashai Annual Tournament (2017) - Bronze

=== Professional wrestling ===
- The Baltimore Sun
  - Newcomer of the Year (2007)
- DDT Pro-Wrestling
  - Ironman Heavymetalweight Championship (1 time)
- Ohio Valley Wrestling
  - OVW Television Championship (2 times)
- Pro Wrestling Illustrated
  - PWI ranked him No. 60 of the top 500 singles wrestlers in the PWI 500 in 2012
- World Wrestling Entertainment / WWE
  - WWE Intercontinental Championship (2 times)
  - WWE United States Championship (1 time)
  - WWE Tag Team Championship (1 time) – with Vladimir Kozlov
  - Miss WrestleMania Battle Royal (2009)
- Wrestling Observer Newsletter
  - Best Gimmick (2007, 2008)

== Mixed martial arts record ==
Professional record breakdown
1 match	0 wins	1 loss
By knockout	0	1

Res.	Record	Opponent	Method	Event	Date	Round	Time	Location	Notes
Loss	0–1	Takashi Ishino	KO (punch)	GCM CanD	October 24, 2004	1	0:26	Tokyo, Japan	

== Filmography ==
Film
Year	Title	Role	Notes
2014	Scooby-Doo! WrestleMania Mystery	Santino Marella	
2014	Jingle All the Way 2	Claude	
2016	Countdown	Himself	

Television
Year	Title	Role	Notes
2016–present	Aftermath	Himself	Panelist
2020–present	Miss Persona	Alfredo	
