= Jin Tala =

American professional wrestler and bodybuilder

Personal information
- Born: Leigh Marie Laurel; November 11, 1995 (age 30) Columbia, Maryland, U.S.

Professional wrestling career
- Ring name(s): Jin Tala; Lady Leigh; Leigh Laurel
- Billed height: 5 ft 7 in (170 cm)
- Billed weight: 145 lb (66 kg)
- Trained by: WWE Performance Center; Booker T
- Debut: December 19, 2024

Leigh Marie Laurel (born November 11, 1995) is an American professional wrestler and bodybuilder currently working on the Independent circuit under the ring name Lady Leigh. She is best known for her time in WWE, where she performed on the Evolve brand under the ring name Jin Tala.

== Early life ==
Laurel was born in Columbia, Maryland on November 11, 1995. She is of Filipino and South Korean descent. Before signing with WWE, Laurel competed in bodybuilding competitions.

== Professional wrestling career ==
=== WWE (2024–2025) ===
Laurel was announced as one of the participants of the first season of WWE LFG, where she was mentored by Booker T and was eliminated on the 12th episode. On the May 28, 2025 episode of Evolve, it was announced that Laurel had been signed to the Evolve brand under the ring name Jin Tala. She made her in ring debut on the June 4 episode of Evolve, where she faced Carlee Bright in a winning effort. On the July 7 episode of Evolve, Tala attacked WWE Evolve Women's Champion Kali Armstrong after a championship match against Natalya, establishing herself as a heel. On the August 6 episode of Evolve, she faced Armstrong for the WWE Evolve Women's Championship but was unsuccessful. On October 11, it was announced that Tala had been released from WWE. She wrestled her final match on the October 29 episode of Evolve, where she faced Masyn Holiday in a losing effort.

=== Independent circuit (2025–present) ===
On October 23, 2025, Beyond Wrestling announced that Laurel would make her debut at the Novembercanrana event on November 14, 2025 under the ring name Lady Leigh, where she defeated Kylie Alexa.

On the October 1, 2026, episode of ROH Wrestling, Lady Leigh made her Ring of Honor debut, where she lost to The IInspiration's Cassie Lee.

== Personal life ==
Laurel is currently in a relationship with Ilja Rukober, known as Ilja Dragunov in AEW.
