= Anthony Luke =

American football player and wrestler (born 1996)

Personal information
- Born: Anthony Luke; November 11, 1996 (age 29) Carmichael, California, U.S.
- Spouse: Maxxine Dupri (m. 2025)

Professional wrestling career
- Ring name(s): Anthony Luke; Kam Hendrix
- Billed height: 6 ft 4 in (1.93 m)
- Billed weight: 260 lb (120 kg)
- Billed from: Roseville, California
- Trained by: WWE Performance Center; Booker T Michelle McCool
- Debut: April 13, 2024
- Football career

Profile
- Position: Defensive end

Personal information
- Listed height: 6 ft 4 in (1.93 m)
- Listed weight: 260 lb (118 kg)

Career information
- High school: Woodcreek High School
- College: American River College (2015–2016); San Diego State University (2017–2018)

Career history
- Montreal Alouettes (2021)*
- * Offseason or practice squad member only

Anthony Luke (born November 11, 1996) is an American professional wrestler and former professional football player. He is signed with WWE, where he performs on the NXT and Evolve brands under the ring name Kam Hendrix.

== Early life ==
Luke lettered three times in football as a defensive lineman and running back while attending Woodcreek High School in Roseville, California. He went on to play college football as a defensive lineman for American River College from 2015–2016 and later San Diego State University from 2017–2018.

== Professional football career ==
On March 10, 2020, Luke signed with the Montreal Alouettes of the Canadian Football League (CFL). The 2020 CFL season was cancelled due to the COVID-19 pandemic. He spent the entire 2021 season on the Alouettes' practice roster. Luke signed a futures contract with Montreal on December 2, 2021. He was released on June 5, 2022.

== Professional wrestling career ==
=== WWE (2024–present) ===
Luke signed with WWE and made his in-ring debut during an April 13, 2024 NXT live event with Josh Black and Shawn Spears in a six-man tag team match against Dion Lennox, Drake Morreaux and Joe Gacy. Luke made his televised debut as a contestant for the first season of the WWE reality television program LFG ("Legends & Future Greats"). On the March 2, 2025 episode, he wrestled his first televised match on LFG against rookie Drake Morreaux. Luke was given the ring name Kam Hendrix and performed on the Evolve brand in late 2025. Hendrix made his debut for the NXT brand on the April 28, 2026 episode of NXT, where he ambushed NXT North American Champion Myles Borne after his championship defense. He got his North American title match on July 28, 2026 episode of NXT which he lost.

== Personal life ==
Luke began dating fellow professional wrestler Sydney Zmrzel, better known as Maxxine Dupri, in 2018. He proposed to her on December 23, 2024, in Troncones, Mexico. The couple were married on December 31, 2025, in Naples, Florida.
