= Elijah Holyfield =

American football player (born 1997)

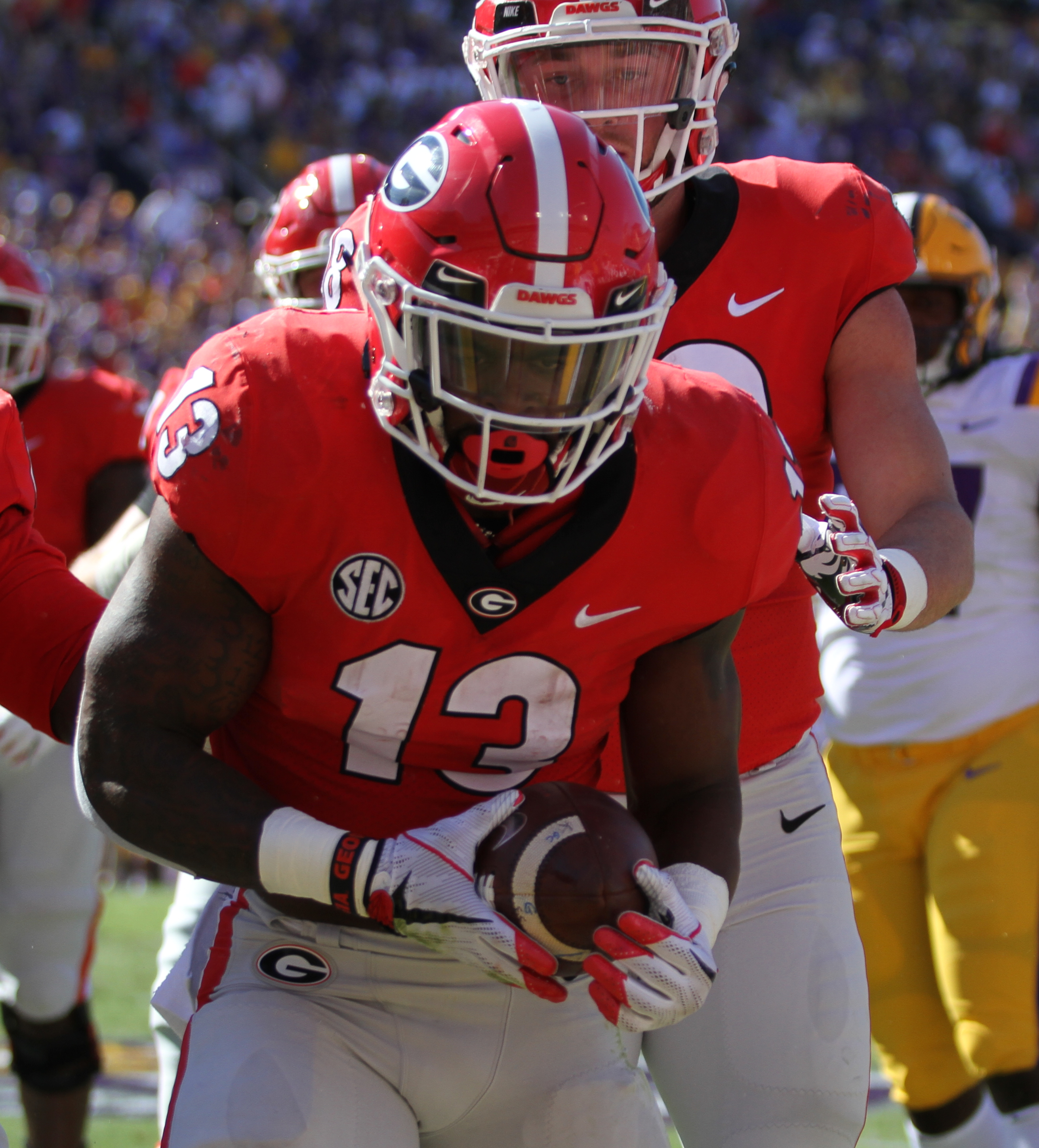
- Holyfield with the Georgia Bulldogs in 2018

Profile
- Position: Running back

Personal information
- Born: November 30, 1997 (age 28); College Park, Georgia, U.S.
- Listed height: 5 ft 10 in (1.78 m)
- Listed weight: 215 lb (98 kg)

Career information
- High school: Woodward Academy (College Park)
- College: Georgia (2016–2018)
- NFL draft: 2019: undrafted

Career history
- Carolina Panthers (2019)*; Philadelphia Eagles (2019–2020); Cincinnati Bengals (2021–2022)
- * Offseason or practice squad member only
- Stats at Pro Football Reference
- Professional wrestling career
- Ring name: Elijah Holyfield
- Billed height: 5 ft 10 in (178 cm)
- Billed weight: 230 lb (104 kg)
- Trained by: Fit Finlay; Johnny Moss; Matt Bloom; Robbie Brookside; WWE Performance Center; The Undertaker
- Debut: 2024

Elijah Esaias Holyfield (born November 30, 1997) is an American professional wrestler and former professional football running back. He is signed to WWE, where he performs on the Evolve brand,

Holyfield played college football for the Georgia Bulldogs and spent four seasons in the NFL.

== Early life ==
Holyfield attended high school at Riverside Military Academy in Gainesville, GA and Woodward Academy in College Park, Georgia. As a junior, he rushed for 1,735 yards and 25 touchdowns and as a senior he rushed for 1,069 yards and 21 touchdowns. He was ranked as a 4-star recruit coming out of high school. He committed to the University of Georgia to play college football.

== College career ==
Holyfield played in five games as a true freshman at Georgia in 2016, rushing six times for 29 yards. As a sophomore in 2017, he rushed for 293 yards on 50 carries and two touchdowns. Splitting time with D'Andre Swift in 2018, Holyfield rushed for 1,018 yards on 159 carries with seven touchdowns. After the season, Holyfield decided to forgo his senior year to pursue a career in the NFL.

== Professional football career ==
Pre-draft measurables
Height	Weight	Arm length	Hand span	Wingspan	40-yard dash	10-yard split	20-yard split	Vertical jump	Broad jump	Bench press
5 ft 10 3/8 in (1.79 m)	217 lb (98 kg)	30 3/8 in (0.77 m)	9 in (0.23 m)	6 ft 0 1/2 in (1.84 m)	4.78 s	1.64 s	2.79 s	29.5 in (0.75 m)	9 ft 10 in (3.00 m)	26 reps
All values from NFL Combine

=== Carolina Panthers ===
Following the conclusion of the 2019 NFL draft, Holyfield signed with the Carolina Panthers as an undrafted free agent on April 29, 2019. He was waived on September 1, 2019, and was re-signed to the practice squad.

=== Philadelphia Eagles ===
After his contract expired with the Panthers, Holyfield was signed to the Philadelphia Eagles active roster on December 31, 2019, ahead of their wild card game against the Seahawks. He was waived on September 3, 2020, and re-signed to the team's practice squad three days later. He was elevated to the active roster on November 21 for the team's week 11 game against the Cleveland Browns, and reverted to the practice squad after the game. He signed a reserve/future contract with the Eagles on January 4, 2021.

On August 29, 2021, Holyfield was waived by the Eagles.

=== Cincinnati Bengals ===
On October 12, 2021, Holyfield was signed to the Cincinnati Bengals practice squad.

On February 15, 2022, Holyfield signed a reserve/future contract.

On July 28, 2022, he was placed on injured reserve after suffering a significant knee injury during team practice the day before.

== Professional wrestling career ==
In November 2024, he signed with WWE's developmental promotion, NXT to begin training as a professional wrestler. In February 2025, Holyfield participated in the first season of LFG (Legends & Future Greats), a reality television series involving "rising talents" competing for a NXT contract and was mentored by The Undertaker. Holyfield would win a contract and was subsequently signed to the promotion's secondary developmental brand, Evolve.

== Personal life ==
He is the son of former heavyweight world champion boxer Evander Holyfield.

He is in a relationship with a fellow WWE LFG participant and wrestler Zena Sterling.
