= WWE LFG =

American professional wrestling reality series

- Season 1 poster
- Genre: Professional wrestling
- Presented by: Vic Joseph (play-by-play commentator); Jeremy Borash (color commentator)
- Judges: Matt Bloom (mentor and match arranger); Booker T; Bubba Ray Dudley; Kevin Owens; Nattie; Johnny Gargano; Mark "The Undertaker" Calaway; Mickie James; Michelle McCool; Terry Taylor
- Narrated by: Joe Tessitore
- Opening theme: "Take A Lesson" by def rebel
- Country of origin: United States
- Original language: English
- No. of seasons: 3
- No. of episodes: 54

Production
- Executive producers: Paul "Triple H" Levesque; Lee Fitting; Shawn Michaels
- Production company: WWE Studios

Original release
- Network: A&E
- Release: February 16, 2025 – September 6, 2026

Related
- WWE Tough Enough; WWE Diva Search

WWE LFG, also known as Legends & Future Greats or simply LFG, is an American professional wrestling reality competition series produced by WWE Studios and broadcast by A&E. The series follows up-and-coming wrestlers from WWE's developmental system, competing for a contract in WWE's NXT division while being mentored by WWE's current, veteran, and Hall of Fame talent.

== History ==
The series was announced in December 2024, as part of WWE Studios' ongoing partnership with A+E Global Media (which, up until then, had primarily consisted of factual and documentary-style programming covering WWE and its history). In preparation for the series, WWE cancelled its in-ring program NXT Level Up in December 2024.

In March 2025, A&E announced that the series had been renewed for a second season, later announcing a premiere on June 22, 2025. Michelle McCool joined the series as a new mentor replacing Mickie James.

In December 2025, it was reported that the third season was in production, with active wrestlers Kevin Owens and Nattie replacing McCool and Mark "The Undertaker" Calaway, the latter of which was due to taking charge of AAA, which was owned by WWE since April of that same year, as rotating mentors, along with the show changing into a non-competitive format, making it more closer to a traditional weekly WWE TV show. Matt Bloom also joined as a mentor and match arranger. During the season, Johnny Gargano and Terry Taylor joined the cast as mentors.

== Premise ==
The series features up-and-coming talent from the WWE Performance Center system competing for a contract in WWE's NXT division. The competitors are mentored by WWE Hall of Famers, veterans, and active wrestlers consisting of Bubba Ray Dudley, Mark "The Undertaker" Calaway (seasons 1 and 2), Shawn Michaels, Mickie James (season 1), Michelle McCool (season 2), Booker T, Kevin Owens (season 3), Nattie (season 3) Matt Bloom (season 3; mentor and match arranger), Johnny Gargano (season 3) and Terry Taylor (season 3). According to Nattie and Booker T, starting from Season 3 will be more focused on the wrestlers, consisting of rosters from the first two seasons, as well as new ones, rather than being a competition between the coaches, in which Bloom arranges matches for them to coach, alongside mentoring the wrestlers, making it more closer to a traditional weekly WWE TV show.

At the end of the Season 1 finale, which took place at The Theater at Madison Square Garden in New York City, Jasper Troy (mentored by Booker) and Tyra Mae Steele (mentored by Calaway) were the winners and earned NXT contracts, following their performances which led them to winning their respective matches. Calaway also earned the LFG Championship as best mentor, as he had the most team points. Most of the Season 1 roster, most notably the season's runner-ups, Zena Sterling (mentored by Dudley) and Shiloh Hill (mentored by Callaway), joined the Season 2 roster to get another shot at winning an NXT contract in addition to four newcomers. Hill went on to win season 2 alongside Dani Sekelsky (mentored by Callaway), following their performances which led them to winning their respective matches, which took place at the 713 Music Hall in Houston, while McCool won the LFG Championship.

Even though some wrestlers did not win the competition, they still went on to wrestle on the NXT and Evolve brands, as well as WWE's sister promoter, AAA (in which Calaway is in charge of) after their time on the show. Starting from Season 3, some wrestlers would be called up and receive an NXT contract, even in the weeks after WrestleMania Weekend, get dismissed from the Performance Center and/or sent to AAA. Furthermore, unlike the finale of the first two seasons, which narrows the field in the playoffs, two male and female competitors will be selected to go to WWE World at WrestleMania, where they battle each other in their respective singles matches, as akin to the final matches for the first two seasons, on WrestleMania Saturday, and team up in a mixed tag team match in the main event on WrestleMania Sunday.

== Episodes ==
| Season | Episodes | Originally released | |
| Season | Episodes | First released | Last released |
|---|---|---|---|
| 1 | 15 | February 16, 2025 | May 18, 2025 |
| 2 | 15 | June 22, 2025 | October 5, 2025 |
| 3 | 24 | April 26, 2026 | September 6, 2026 |

== Cast ==
List of WWE LFG Legends
| Image | Name | Season | | |
| Image | Name | 1 | 2 | 3 |
|---|---|---|---|---|
| | Booker T | Yes | Yes | Yes |
| | Bubba Ray Dudley | Yes | Yes | Yes |
| | Kevin Owens | No | No | Yes |
| | Nattie | No | No | Yes |
| | Matt Bloom | No | No | Yes (Note: Mentor and match arranger) |
| | Mark "The Undertaker" Calaway | Won | Yes | No |
| | Michelle McCool | No | Won | No |
| | Mickie James | Yes | No | No |
| | Johnny Gargano | No | No | Yes |
| | Terry Taylor | No | No | Yes |

List of current WWE LFG contestants
| Contestant | Age | From | Background | Season | | | After WWE LFG |
| Contestant | Age | From | Background | 1 | 2 | 3 | After WWE LFG |
|---|---|---|---|---|---|---|---|
| Anthony Luke / Kam Hendrix | 28 | Roseville, California | American football | Yes | Yes | Yes | Performs on the NXT brand Billed as Anthony Luke in Seasons 1 and 2 and as Kam Hendrix in Season 3. |
| Bayley Humphrey | 23 | Chandler, Arizona | Acrobatics | Yes | Yes | Yes | Performs on the NXT brand under the ring name Myka Lockwood |
| Chantel Monroe | 26 | Sarasota, Florida | Gymnastics | No | No | Yes | Performs on the Evolve brand |
| Cutler James | 24 | Allentown, Pennsylvania | Amateur wrestling | Yes | No | No | Performs on the NXT brand |
| Dani Sekelsky | 23 | Nashville, Tennessee | Cheerleading | Yes | Won | No | Performs on the NXT brand under the ring name Skylar Raye |
| Dorian Van Dux | 29 | Mons, Belgium | Professional wrestling | No | No | Yes | Performs on the Evolve brand and in AAA |
| Drake Morreaux | 26 | Baton Rouge, Louisiana | American football | Yes | Yes | Yes | Performed on the Evolve brand Moved to AAA following his on-show removal from the WWE Performance Center, and currently competes there under the persona of "El Carnicero". |
| Elijah Holyfield | 27 | College Park, Georgia | American football | Yes | Yes | Yes | Performs on the Evolve brand |
| Elio LeFleur | 27 | Paris, France | Professional wrestling | No | No | Yes | Performs on the NXT brand and in AAA; Former WWE Speed Champion |
| Harlem Lewis | 25 | Lindenhurst, New York | American football | No | Yes | Yes | Performs on the Evolve brand Current WWE Evolve Men's Champion |
| Harley Riggins | 25 | Chardon, Ohio | American football | No | No | Yes | Performs on the Evolve brand |
| Jax Presley | 26 | Middletown, Maryland | American football | No | No | Yes | Performs on the Evolve brand |
| Kali Armstrong | 31 | Inglewood, California | Track and field | No | No | Yes | Performs on the NXT brand Inaugural WWE Evolve Women's Champion |
| Kendal Grey | 24 | Las Vegas, Nevada | Amateur wrestling | No | No | Yes | Performs on the NXT brand Former WWE Evolve Women's Champion; Former WWE NXT Women's Champion |
| Layla Diggs | 27 | Fresno, California | Track and field | No | No | Yes | Performs on the Evolve and NXT brands |
| Nikkita Lyons | 26 | Las Vegas, Nevada | Taekwondo | No | No | Yes | Performs on the NXT and Evolve brands Current WWE Evolve Women's Champion |
| Romeo Moreno | 23 | Madrid, Spain | Professional wrestling | No | No | Yes | Performs on the Evolve brand |
| Shady Elnahas | 27 | Alexandria, Egypt | Judoka | No | No | Yes | Performs on the Evolve brand under the ring name Shido Ash |
| Shiloh Hill | 26 | Mission Viejo, California | American football | Yes | Won | No | Performs on the NXT brand |
| Tate Wilder | 28 | Gilbert, Arizona | American football | No | No | Yes | Performs on the NXT brand Previously appeared as Case Hatch in Season 1 Episode 3 (Note: Replaced Brayden "BJ" Ray by being the standout in a tag team match where he teamed with Case Hatch against the team of Josh Black and Drake Starks.) |
| Tristan Angels | 22 | Isle of Purbeck, England | Gymnastics | No | No | Yes | Performs on the NXT brand and in AAA |

List of former WWE LFG contestants
| Contestant | Age | From | Background | Season | | | After WWE LFG |
| Contestant | Age | From | Background | 1 | 2 | 3 | After WWE LFG |
|---|---|---|---|---|---|---|---|
| Brayden "BJ" Ray | 25 | Corona, California | Amateur wrestling | Yes | Yes | No | Released from WWE on October 10, 2025; Now performing on the independent circuit as of 2026. |
| Braxton Cole | 25 | Goffstown, New Hampshire | American football | No | No | Yes | Performed on the Evolve brand. Released from WWE on September 4, 2026. |
| Carlee Bright | 25 | Kenosha, Wisconsin | Cheerleading | No | No | Yes | Performed on the NXT and Evolve brands Released from WWE on April 26, 2026. |
| Chris Island | 22 | Vacaville, California | Amateur wrestling | Yes | Yes | Yes | Acted as a security guard on the NXT brand. Released from WWE on April 24, 2026. |
| Haze Jameson | 24 | Waxhaw, North Carolina | Volleyball | No | Yes | No | Released from WWE on October 10, 2025. Now performing on the independent circuit as of 2026. |
| Jasper Troy | 26 | Huffman, Texas | American football | Won | No | No | Performed on the NXT brand Former WWE Speed Champion; Released from WWE on September 4, 2026. |
| Keanu Carver | 27 | Silver Spring, Maryland | American football | No | No | Yes | Performed on the NXT brand Released from WWE on October 5, 2026. |
| Leigh Laurel | 29 | Columbia, Maryland | Bodybuilding | Yes | No | No | Performed on the Evolve brand under the ring name Jin Tala. Released from WWE on October 10, 2025. Now performing on the independent circuit as of 2026. |
| Masyn Holiday | 25 | Stockbridge, Georgia | Track and field | No | No | Yes | Performed on the Evolve brand Released from WWE on June 16, 2026. |
| Penina Tuilaepa / PJ Vasa | 25 | Las Vegas, Nevada | Rugby union | Yes | Yes | Yes | Performed on the Evolve brand Billed as PJ Vasa in Season 3 Released from WWE on September 4, 2026. |
| Sirena Linton | 23 | Phoenix, Arizona | Gymnastics | Yes | Yes | Yes | Released from WWE on April 24, 2026. |
| Summer Sorrell | 25 | Chicago, Illinois | Track and field | No | Yes | No | Released from WWE on October 10, 2025. |
| Tatyanna Dumas | 25 | Adelaide, Australia | Basketball | Yes | Yes | No | Released from WWE in January 2026. |
| Trill London | 25 | Yonkers, New York | American football | No | Yes | Yes | Performed on the Evolve brand. Released from WWE on April 24, 2026. |
| Troy Yearwood | 24 | Chesapeake, Virginia | Track and field | Yes | No | No | Performed on the Evolve brand under the ring name Jamar Hampton; Released from WWE on October 10, 2025. |
| Tyra Mae Steele | 32 | Katy, Texas | Amateur wrestling | Won | No | No | Performed on the NXT and Evolve brands Released from WWE on April 24, 2026. |
| Zena Sterling | 21 | Broadview Heights, Ohio | Swimming | Yes | Yes | Yes | Performed on the Evolve brand Released from WWE on September 4, 2026. |

List of other WWE LFG prospects
| Contestant | Age | From | Background | Appearance | After WWE LFG Appearance |
|---|---|---|---|---|---|
| Drake Starks | 25 | Ringgold, Georgia | American football | Season 1 Episode 3 | Performed on the Evolve brand under the ring name Drako Knox; Released from WWE on October 10, 2025 |
| Josh Black | 27 | Loves Park, Illinois | American football | Season 1 Episode 3 | Performs on the NXT brand under the ring name Osiris Griffin; Former two-time NXT Tag Team Champion |

== Teams ==
– Future Great Winner
– Runner-Up
– Legend Winner

=== Season 1 ===
| Legend | Team Points | Future Greats | Standout Points | Eliminated |
|---|---|---|---|---|
| The Undertaker | 9 (Note: In Episode 4, a team point was awarded to the entire team and there were no individual standout points.) | | | |
| The Undertaker | 9 | Tyra Mae Steele | 3 (Note: First standout point allowed them to choose which mentor they wanted and therefore did not count towards the total team points.) (Note: Won a team point as a part of a duo.) | Winner |
| The Undertaker | 9 | Shiloh Hill | 4 | Runner-Up |
| The Undertaker | 9 | Elijah Holyfield | 2 | Episode 13 |
| The Undertaker | 9 | Bayley Humphrey | 2 | Episode 12 |
| Booker T | 7 | | | |
| Booker T | 7 | Jasper Troy | 3 | Winner |
| Booker T | 7 | Penina Tuilaepa | 0 | Episode 14 |
| Booker T | 7 | Anthony Luke | 4 | Episode 13 |
| Booker T | 7 | Leigh Laurel | 1 | Episode 12 |
| Bubba Ray Dudley | 5 | | | |
| Bubba Ray Dudley | 5 | Zena Sterling | 5 | Runner-Up |
| Bubba Ray Dudley | 5 | Brayden "BJ" Ray (Note: Replaced by Cutler James after sustaining a shoulder injury during a live event match between Episode 2 and 3. He was medically cleared and returned to the team in Episode 9 however, he kept making occasional appearances throughout his time out.) | 0 | Episode 14 |
| Bubba Ray Dudley | 5 | Drake Morreaux | 0 | Episode 13 |
| Bubba Ray Dudley | 5 | Tatyanna Dumas | 1 | Episode 12 |
| Bubba Ray Dudley | 5 | Cutler James | 0 | Episode 10 |
| Mickie James | 3 | | | |
| Mickie James | 3 | Chris Island | 0 | Episode 14 |
| Mickie James | 3 | Dani Sekelsky | 1 | Episode 14 |
| Mickie James | 3 | Troy Yearwood | 1 | Episode 13 |
| Mickie James | 3 | Sirena Linton | 1 | Episode 12 |

=== Season 2 ===
| Legend | Team Points | Future Greats | Standout Points | Eliminated |
|---|---|---|---|---|
| Michelle McCool | 8 | | | |
| Michelle McCool | 8 | Penina Tuilaepa | 4 | Runner-Up |
| Michelle McCool | 8 | Anthony Luke | 2 | Episode 14 |
| Michelle McCool | 8 | Trill London | 2 | Episode 13 |
| Michelle McCool | 8 | Summer Sorrell (Note: Eliminated due to suffering an injury.) | 0 | Episode 12 |
| The Undertaker | 6 | | | |
| The Undertaker | 6 | Shiloh Hill | 2 | Winner |
| The Undertaker | 6 | Dani Sekelsky | 3 | Winner |
| The Undertaker | 6 | Drake Morreaux | 1 | Episode 13 |
| The Undertaker | 6 | Bayley Humphrey | 0 | Episode 12 |
| Bubba Ray Dudley | 5 | | | |
| Bubba Ray Dudley | 5 | Drake Morreaux (Note: Replaced injured Team Bubba member Elijah Holyfield after being eliminated from Team Undertaker.) | 1 | Episode 15 |
| Bubba Ray Dudley | 5 | Zena Sterling | 1 | Episode 14 |
| Bubba Ray Dudley | 5 | Brayden "BJ" Ray | 0 | Episode 13 |
| Bubba Ray Dudley | 5 | Elijah Holyfield | 2 | Episode 13 |
| Bubba Ray Dudley | 5 | Haze Jameson | 1 | Episode 12 |
| Booker T | 3 | | | |
| Booker T | 3 | Harlem Lewis | 1 | Runner-Up |
| Booker T | 3 | Sirena Linton | 2 | Episode 14 |
| Booker T | 3 | Chris Island | 0 | Episode 13 |
| Booker T | 3 | Tatyanna Dumas | 0 | Episode 12 |

== See also ==
- WWE NXT seasons 1–5
