= Keanu Carver =

American professional wrestler

Personal information
- Born: Kevin Isaiah Robertson Silver Spring, Maryland, U.S.

Professional wrestling career
- Ring name: Keanu Carver
- Billed height: 6 ft 2 in (188 cm)
- Billed weight: 290 lb (132 kg)
- Billed from: Silver Spring, Maryland
- Trained by: WWE Performance Center
- Debut: November 11, 2023

Kevin Isaiah Robertson is an American former professional wrestler and college football player. He is best known for his time in WWE, where he performed under the ring name Keanu Carver.

== Early life ==
Kevin Isaiah Robertson was born in Silver Spring, Maryland, and raised in Takoma Park, Maryland. Prior to his professional wrestling career, he played college football as a defensive tackle for the Temple University Owls from 2019 to 2021, bringing notable power and athleticism to his professional wrestling style.

== Professional wrestling career ==
=== WWE (2023–2026) ===
On June 1, 2023, WWE announced Robertson as a member of the WWE Performance Center's spring rookie class of 2023. He made his televised debut on the December 12, 2023 episode of NXT under the ring name Keanu Carver as part of the NXT Breakout Tournament, where he was eliminated in the first round by Riley Osborne. Carver continued to work on NXT Level Up, competing against opponents such as Joe Coffey and Javier Bernal as part of his ongoing development on WWE's developmental brands. In 2025, Carver was a featured competitor on the Evolve brand and participated in a fatal four-way elimination match to determine the inaugural WWE Evolve Champion, where he competed against eventual inaugural champion Jackson Drake, Sean Legacy, and Edris Enofé.

On January 14, 2026 episode of NXT, Carver officially joined the NXT brand as he left an impression as the last man standing in the ring. In April, Carver participated in season 3 of LFG. On October 5, Carver was quietly released from WWE in the wake of allegations of domestic abuse and stalking made against him, with his profile being completely expunged from the official WWE website on November 6.

== Personal life ==
Robertson is a fan of the Washington Commanders.

== Legal issues ==
In September 2026, a NXT wrestler later revealed to be Bianca Carelli, better known as Arianna Grace, filed a petition for an order of protection against Robertson, alleging that he had stalked and harassed her following the end of their relationship. The filing also alleged previous instances of threatening and abusive behavior during their relationship. A Florida judge granted a temporary protection order on September 14. Following a September 22 hearing, the order was extended until another hearing scheduled for October 20. Authorities had not confirmed whether criminal charges would be filed. Robertson requested a continuance to obtain legal counsel. On September 29, Carver took to his X account to three posts: the first two denied the allegations while the third post stated "Keep god first" before deleting his X account. In November 2026, it was reported that Robertson had been placed in a psychiatric hold a month earlier after entering a woman's house with a knife, threatening to commit suicide, and had possibly drunk half a bottle of drain cleaner.

== Championships and accomplishments ==
- Pro Wrestling Illustrated
  - Ranked No. 293 of the top singles wrestlers in the PWI 500 in 2026
