= Tristan Angels =

British professional wrestler

Personal information
- Born: Nathaniel Cranton; June 9, 2003 (age 23) Wareham, Dorset, England

Professional wrestling career
- Ring name(s): Tristan Angels; Nathan Angel; Nathan Cranton
- Debut: 2022

Nathaniel Cranton (born June 9, 2003) is an English professional wrestler signed to WWE, where he performs on the NXT brand under the ring name Tristan Angels. He previously competed under the ring name Nathan Angel.

== Early life ==
Cranton is from Wareham, Dorset, England, and previously worked as a sheep farmer before pursuing a career in professional wrestling at age 18 after seeing a wrestling show at the Bournemouth Pavilion. He also competed in bodybuilding and modelling competitions, including the Mr. England pageant, where he was a finalist in 2024.

== Professional wrestling career ==
=== Independent circuit (2022–2025) ===
Cranton began his professional wrestling career in 2022. He competed on the European independent wrestling scene under the ring name Nathan Angel.

=== WWE (2025–present) ===
In 2025, Cranton signed with WWE as part of a new recruitment class and reported to the WWE Performance Center. He was later given the ring name Tristan Angels. Angels made his first on-screen appearance for WWE developmental brand Evolve on the April 1, 2026 episode when he was in the VIP Lounge with Romeo Moreno, where they heckled Dorian Van Dux during a match. Days later, he appeared on WWE-related programming AAA on Fox on April 4, 2026, in which he competed in a six-man tag team main event match as part of Team UK with Charlie Dempsey and Nathan Frazer where they were unsuccessful against Team Europe (Axiom, Elio Lefleur and Dorian Van Dux). He competed in his first singles match on the April 8 episode of Evolve, where he successfully picked up a victory over Romeo Moreno. On the April 28, 2026 episode of NXT, Angels made his televised debut, confronting Myles Borne following his match before being joined by Kam Hendrix.
