= Michelle McCool =

American retired professional wrestler (born 1980)

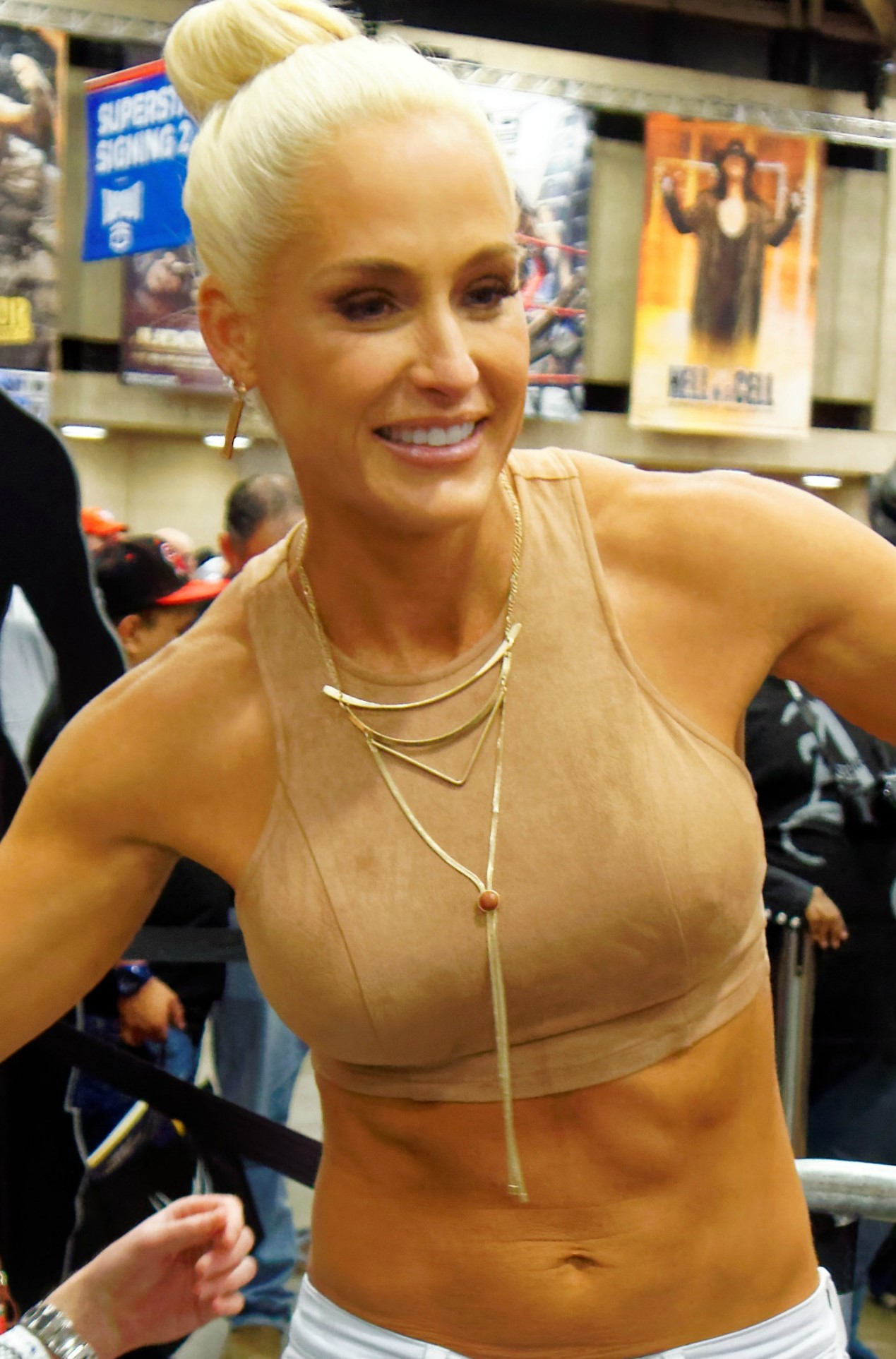
- McCool in 2016

Personal information
- Born: Michelle Leigh McCool; January 25, 1980 (age 46) Palatka, Florida, U.S.
- Education: Florida State University
- Spouses: Jeremy Alexander (m. 2001; div. 2006) Mark Calaway (m. 2010)
- Children: 2

Professional wrestling career
- Ring name: Michelle McCool
- Billed height: 5 ft 10 in (178 cm)
- Billed weight: 127 lb (58 kg)
- Billed from: Palatka, Florida
- Trained by: Deep South Wrestling; Ohio Valley Wrestling
- Debut: November 18, 2004
- Retired: May 1, 2011

Michelle Leigh Calaway (née McCool; born January 25, 1980) is an American retired professional wrestler. She is signed to WWE, as an ambassador.

McCool originally worked as a middle school teacher in Palatka, Florida. She joined WWE in 2004 after participating in the WWE Diva Search. From 2005 to 2007, she utilized the character of a personal trainer, before changing it to that of a teacher. At The Great American Bash in 2008, McCool became the inaugural WWE Divas Champion, holding the title for approximately five months. She then won the WWE Women's Championship at The Bash in 2009, becoming the first female wrestler to have held both titles. At Night of Champions in 2010, she unified both titles becoming the first and only WWE Unified Divas Champion.

McCool held both titles on two occasions, which makes her a four-time champion overall. In November 2010, she was ranked number one in Pro Wrestling Illustrated's Female 50, before retiring the following year. Since 2018, McCool has made occasional appearances in WWE, including participating in matches. In 2025, she was inducted into the WWE Hall of Fame. McCool was officially inducted by her husband and fellow WWE Hall of Famer, The Undertaker.

== Early life ==
Both of McCool's parents work in education; her mother, Jenny, is a teacher and her father, Terry, is a superintendent. She has an older brother who played football at the University of Cincinnati. Growing up, McCool was an alleged professional wrestling fan. Before and during high school, McCool played softball, basketball and volleyball. She also played first base at Pasco-Hernando Community College. McCool later received her Master's degree in Educational leadership from Florida State University, and taught seventh grade science for four years in her hometown of Palatka, Florida. She also competed in National Physique Committee fitness contests, taught rhythmic gymnastics and kickboxing, and worked as a personal trainer.

== Professional wrestling career ==
=== World Wrestling Entertainment/WWE (2004–2011) ===
==== Developmental territories and training (2004–2006) ====
McCool first came to World Wrestling Entertainment (WWE) as a competitor in the 2004 WWE Diva Search, losing to Christy Hemme. Although she was eliminated, WWE signed her to a three-year deal in November. She quickly began appearing in backstage segments on SmackDown! portraying a fitness trainer and teaching various wrestlers stretches. She wrestled in her first SmackDown! match, teaming with Big Show to defeat Dawn Marie and René Duprée on March 3, 2005. McCool made her singles debut match on March 24, losing to Marie. A few months later, McCool became a part of the feud between MNM (Johnny Nitro and Joey Mercury) and Heidenreich when she defended Heidenreich against MNM's manager Melina's verbal attacks. In a match on June 30, Melina defeated McCool by pinning her with the illegal aid of the ring ropes as leverage.

McCool was then sent to WWE's developmental facility, Deep South Wrestling (DSW), where she wrestled, performed interviews, hosted segments, and provided color commentary. While in DSW, she was hospitalized after having an allergic reaction to a prescribed medication and was temporarily sidelined to recover. Eventually, she started to train in WWE's other developmental territory, Ohio Valley Wrestling (OVW). While in OVW, she began managing the duo of Amish Roadkill and K.C. James.

==== Main roster debut (2006–2008) ====
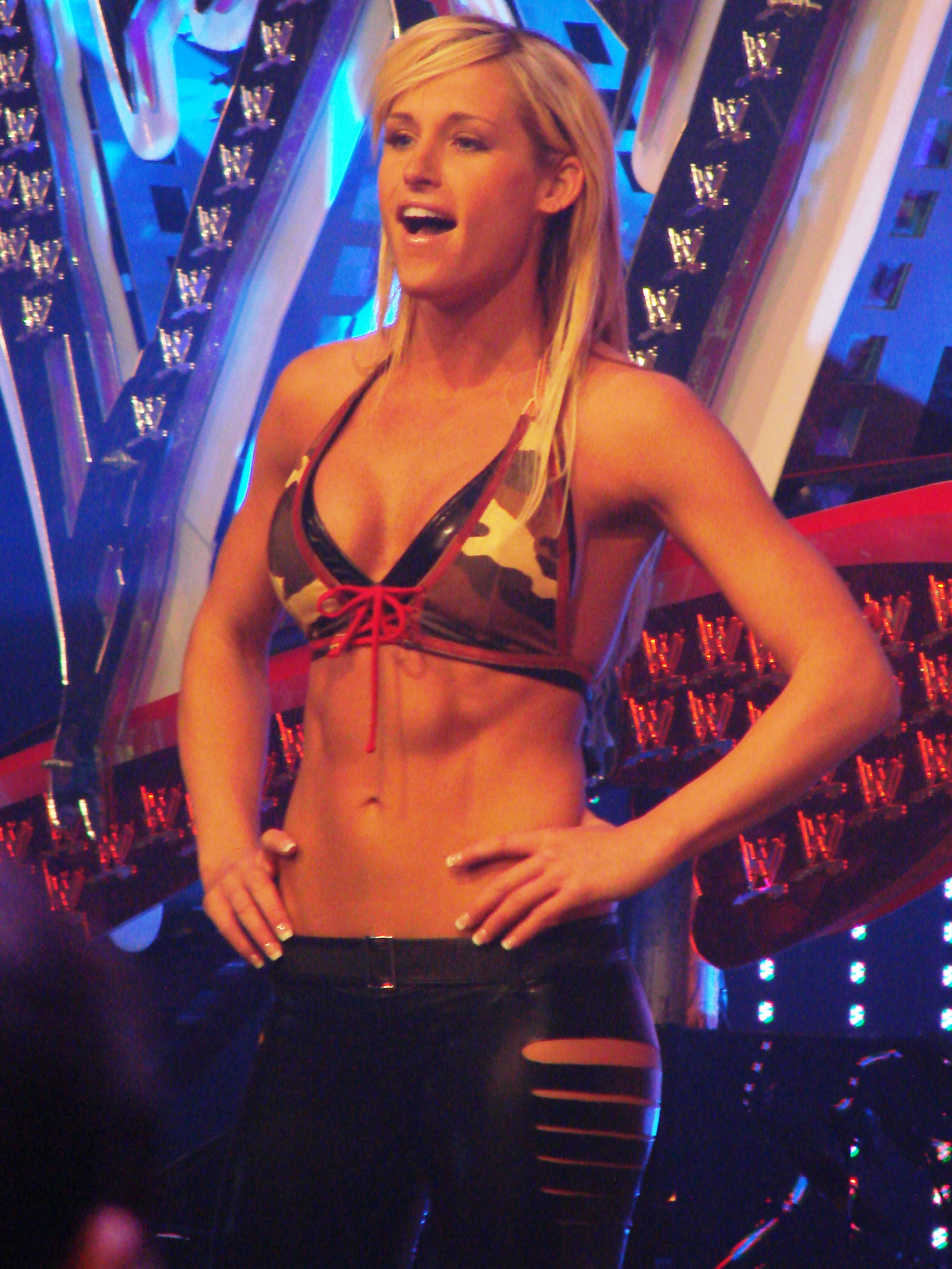
McCool in March 2008

McCool returned to SmackDown! on June 2, 2006, this time as a villainess with a "sexy teacher" gimmick, playing on her real life experiences as a teacher. Upon her arrival, she aligned with Kristal Marshall to feud with Jillian Hall and Ashley Massaro. This feud led to a Fatal Four-Way Bra and Panties match at The Great American Bash, which Massaro won. She won her first singles match on the July 28 episode of SmackDown!, defeating Hall by illegally using the ropes as leverage.

Soon after, she began acting as valet for the team of K.C. James and Idol Stevens, who, because of her association with them, were nicknamed The Teacher's Pets. The trio began feuding with Paul London and Brian Kendrick, and their valet Massaro, for the WWE Tag Team Championship, but never won the title. The feud ended when London and Kendrick won a match against them at No Mercy in October. On November 28, McCool was hospitalized with an enlarged kidney, a broken sternum, and an electrolyte imbalance. (Note: McCool originally injured her back during a WWE European tour. Because of pain in her back, she was unaware of the sternum injury until she went to the hospital for treatment. Tests also revealed that she had an enlarged kidney.) She was released from the hospital on December 2. McCool returned on the March 30, 2007, episode of SmackDown!, where she participated in a 10-Diva tag team match. On the April 13 episode of SmackDown!, McCool as a fan favorite once again, when she came to the aid of Ashley after she was attacked by Jillian Hall backstage. Subsequently, a series of matches took place between Victoria and McCool, including a mixed tag team match where Victoria and Kenny Dykstra defeated McCool and Chuck Palumbo.

==== "All-American Diva" and Divas Champion (2008–2009) ====
McCool was then repackaged as "The All-American Diva", where she began accompanying her on-screen friend Chuck Palumbo during matches against Jamie Noble. After a series of matches between the men, Noble won a date with McCool by defeating Palumbo. In the storyline, Palumbo accidentally elbowed McCool during a match, causing her to suffer a concussion. The partnership was dissolved when McCool refused to accept his apology. She then went on to compete in a series of matches with Victoria, Eve Torres, Maryse and Cherry to determine SmackDown!'s top Diva, with McCool winning title.

On the July 4, 2008, episode of SmackDown!, McCool won a Golden Dreams match to face Natalya for the WWE Divas Championship at The Great American Bash. At the event, on July 20, McCool defeated Natalya to become the inaugural WWE Divas Champion. McCool successfully defended the title against Maryse on SmackDown and at the Unforgiven pay-per-view in September, and against Maria on SmackDown in November. On the December 26 episode of SmackDown!, McCool lost the Divas championship to Maryse. After the match McCool turned heel by attacking Maria, the special guest referee of the match, and blaming her for the loss. In the following weeks, McCool also attacked Eve Torres, resulting in Torres' debut match, which McCool won.

McCool then defeated Gail Kim on the May 22, 2009, taping of SmackDown to become the number one contender for the WWE Women's Championship. A month later at The Bash, McCool defeated Melina – with help from Alicia Fox – to win her first Women's Championship. With her win, McCool became the first Diva to have won both the WWE Divas and Women's championships. She retained the championship against Melina in a rematch on July 26 at Night of Champions, and also in a Lumberjill match on the October 2 episode of SmackDown.

==== LayCool and retirement (2009–2011) ====
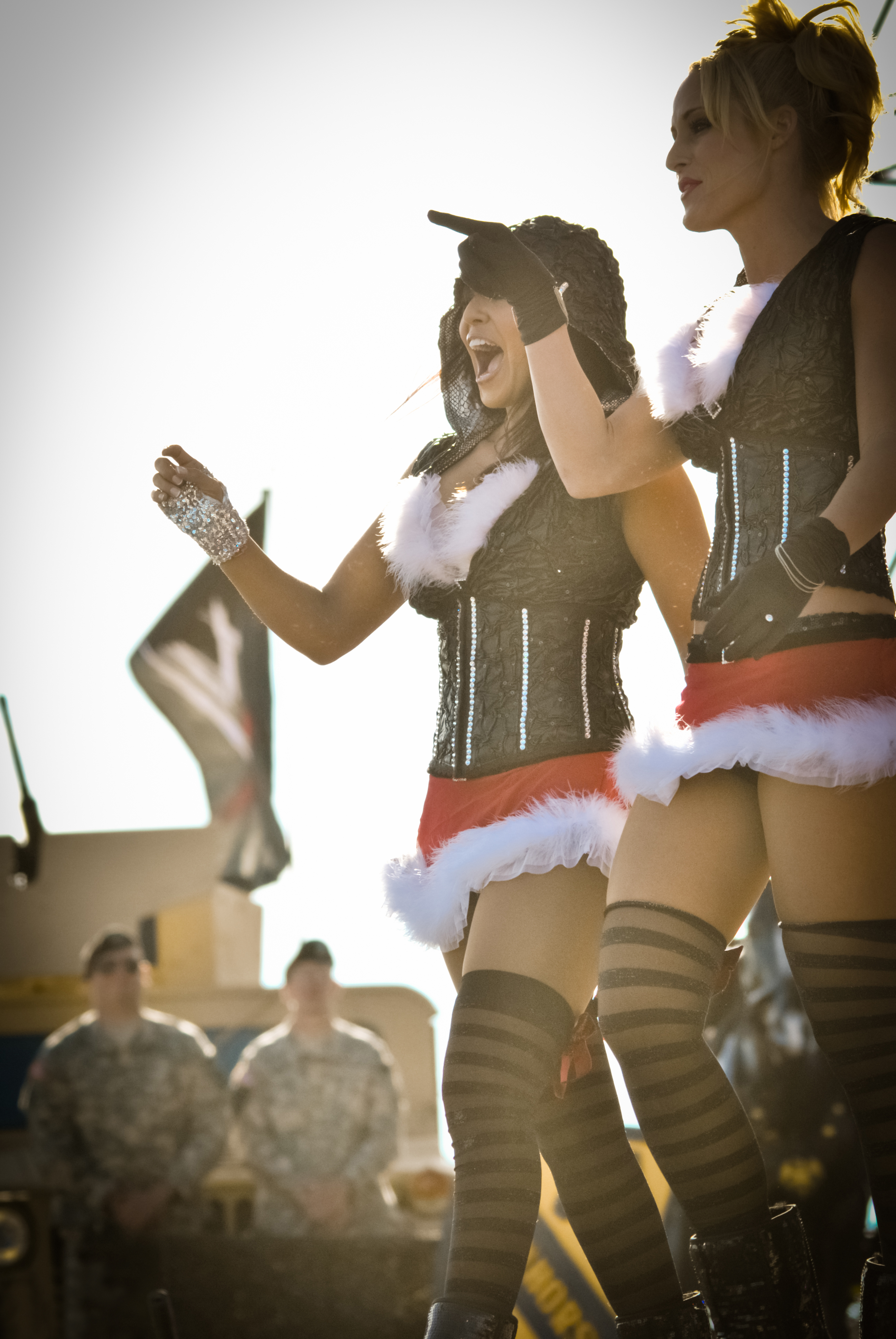
McCool (right) with Layla as LayCool at the 2010 Tribute to the Troops event

McCool then allied with Layla to form LayCool, and the duo entered a controversial feud with Mickie James, in which LayCool bullied James and made fun of her weight, calling her "Piggy James". The feud resulted in a five-on-five Survivor Series match at the 2009 Survivor Series, which James' team won, when Melina pinned McCool. James then became the number one contender for McCool's WWE Women's Championship at TLC: Tables, Ladders & Chairs, where McCool successfully retained the championship after interference from Layla. The "Piggy James" feud had a negative reception, being voted by the Wrestling Observer Newsletter the "Most Disgusting Promotional Tactic" of 2009. In 2025, McCool said during an interview she never felt comfortable with the angle.

McCool lost the Women's Championship to James at the Royal Rumble, although she regained it on the February 26, 2010, episode of SmackDown! when special guest referee Vickie Guerrero interfered, to become a two-time Women's Champion. On the April 23 episode of SmackDown!, McCool and Layla defeated Beth Phoenix and Mickie James, and attacked Phoenix after the match. This led to McCool losing the championship to Phoenix in an "Extreme Makeover" match at Extreme Rules. On the May 14 episode of SmackDown!, McCool and Layla faced Phoenix in a Women's Championship two-on-one handicap match, in which Layla pinned Phoenix to win the championship. Despite Layla's win, McCool and Layla cut the Women's Championship in half, and the duo were unofficially referred to as the "co-champions".

On the July 30 episode of SmackDown!, McCool took Layla's place in her Women's Championship match against Tiffany, defeating her and retaining the title. At Night of Champions, McCool defeated Melina to unify the WWE Women's Championship with the WWE Divas Championship, becoming the first WWE Unified Divas Champion, and both McCool and Layla carried their own separate championship belts. At Survivor Series on November 21, she lost the Divas Championship when Natalya defeated McCool and Layla in a two-on-one handicap match. At TLC: Tables, Ladders and Chairs, McCool and Layla were defeated in the first Divas tag team tables match by Natalya and Beth Phoenix. LayCool invoked their rematch clause in January 2011, prompting the scheduling of a two-on-one handicap match at the Royal Rumble. At the event, however, the match was altered to a fatal four-way with the addition of Eve Torres, who won the match.

On the April 8 episode of SmackDown!, dissension began to show between McCool and Layla after they were defeated by Beth Phoenix and Kelly Kelly, due to McCool avoiding being tagged in by Layla, citing a back injury. After more arguing and unsuccessful couples therapy sessions in the following weeks, LayCool officially disbanded. On the April 29 episode of SmackDown, McCool faced Layla in a singles match, which ended in a double countout after the two began brawling. After the match, Layla challenged McCool to a no disqualification and no countout match at Extreme Rules. McCool accepted under one condition, which was that the loser leaves WWE. At Extreme Rules, McCool was pinned by Layla, in her final full-time WWE match.

In a June 2019 episode of Lilian Garcia's Chasing Glory podcast, McCool revealed that her departure from WWE was due to dealing with numerous injuries, including a torn MCL. She also explained that conflicts with the WWE writing staff and wanting to have children further contributed to her decision to leave:

"It was tough just leaving in itself was tough because it got to a point where I was dealing with so much again mostly being Undertaker's girlfriend and why I was on TV and even having a writer throw the papers up one day and say 'Why don't we just call it the Michelle McCool and Undertaker show?!' It was nonstop and I went to Vince on numerous occasions and bless his heart he was wonderful, but I just said Vince, I don't wanna hate something that I grew up loving so much and the longer I stay the more I'm like getting a sour taste in my mouth. So making that decision to leave was as hard as it is, but more than wanting to be in WWE or be a champion I've always wanted to be a mom."

=== Return to WWE (2018–present) ===
On January 22, 2018, McCool was honored as part of a segment involving women that contributed to the company's success on the WWE Raw 25 Years special episode. During the following years, she also participated into the Royal Rumble match at the 2018, 2022 and 2023 Royal Rumble events. In October, McCool took part in the all women's pay-per-view, WWE Evolution, by participating in a battle royal. During an appearance on ESPN's morning program Get Up on February 14, 2025, McCool learned that she would be inducted into the WWE Hall of Fame.

== Filmography ==
During the week of November 5, 2007, she appeared on six episodes of Family Feud with several other WWE wrestlers and Divas. She also appeared on the February 6, 2008, episode of Project Runway with Maria Kanellis, Candice Michelle, Torrie Wilson, Kristal Marshall, and Layla El. On June 3, 2008, she appeared on The Best Damn Sports Show Period with John Cena. In addition, McCool appeared in the January 2009 edition of Muscle & Fitness, along with Eve Torres and Maryse. She also appeared on a special WWE edition of Are You Smarter Than a Fifth Grader.

=== Film and television ===
Year	Title	Role	Notes
2004	WWE RAW Diva Search Casting Special	Self; contestant	TV special
2004	WWE 2004 RAW Diva Search	Self; contestant	7th place, 6 episodes
2005	WWE Hall of Fame 2005	Self; guest	TV special
2005	WWE Viva Las Divas	Self	Direct to DVD
2006	WWE Hall of Fame 2006	Self; guest	TV special
2006	WWE Divas Do New York	Self	Direct to DVD
2007	WWE Hall of Fame 2007	Self; guest	TV special
2007	Family Feud	Self; contestant	6 episodes
2008	WWE Hall of Fame 2008	Self; guest	TV special
2008	Project Runway	Self; guest	3 episodes
2008	The Best Damn Sports Show Period	Self; guest	1 episode
2009	WWE Hall of Fame 2009	Self; guest	TV special
2009	Are You Smarter Than a Fifth Grader?	Self; contestant	1 episode
2009	GameSpot TV	Self; guest	1 episode
2010	WWE Hall of Fame 2010	Self; guest	TV special
2010	Double Exposure	Self; fashion expert	1 episode
2011	WWE Hall of Fame 2011	Self; guest	TV special
2013	WWE Hall of Fame 2013	Self; guest	TV special
2016	Table for 3	Self	1 episode
2018	Then, Now, Forever: Evolution of WWE's Women's Division	Self	Direct to DVD
2020	Undertaker: The Last Ride	Self	Documentary
2020	WWE The Bump	Self; guest	2 episodes
2021	WWE Ruthless Aggression	Self	Documentary
2021	WWE's Most Wanted Treasures	Self; guest	1 episode
2022	WWE Hall of Fame 2022	Self; guest	TV special
2025	WWE Hall of Fame 2025	Self; inductee	TV special
2025	WWE LFG	Self	Season 1–2

=== Video games ===
Year	Title	Notes	Ref.
2005	WWE SmackDown! vs. Raw 2006	Video game debut	
2007	WWE SmackDown vs. Raw 2008		
2008	WWE SmackDown vs. Raw 2009		
2009	WWE SmackDown vs. Raw 2010		
2010	WWE SmackDown vs. Raw 2011		
2011	WWE '12		
2024	WWE 2K24	Downloadable content	
2025	WWE 2K25		
2026	WWE 2K26		

== Personal life ==
McCool was married to Jeremy Louis Alexander, whom she began dating in high school. The couple divorced in 2006. She married fellow wrestler Mark Calaway, known professionally as The Undertaker, on June 26, 2010, in Houston, Texas. Their first child together, their daughter Kaia, was born in August 2012. They have a younger adopted son named Kolt.

McCool is a devout Christian, and she incorporated Christian crosses on her wrestling attire.

She has had several wrestling-related injuries; in November 2007, she fractured her nose during an overseas WWE tour after Victoria's clothesline hit her in the face. She has been hospitalized twice, had two broken ribs, a broken sternum, and a broken xiphoid process. When she eventually decided to retire from active wrestling competition and thus left the WWE and ended her active career, she mentioned that her foot had been injured for two months prior with a broken toe, torn joint capsules and a torn MCL. In 2016 she was diagnosed with skin cancer, and underwent successful treatment. In April 2019, she publicly disclosed she had battled infertility, and had experienced several miscarriages.

== Championships and accomplishments ==
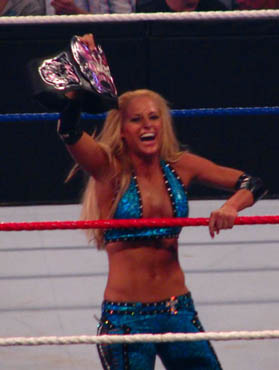
McCool is the inaugural and two-time WWE Divas Champion.

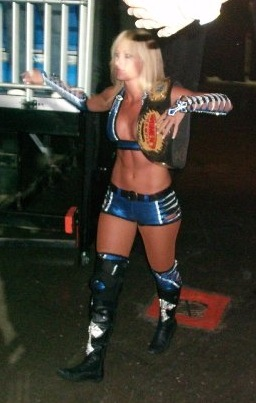
McCool is also a two-time WWE Women's Champion.

- Live Audio Wrestling End of Year Awards
  - Feud of the Year (2009) - with Maryse for the WWE Divas Championship
- Pro Wrestling Illustrated
  - Woman of the Year (2010)
  - Ranked No. 1 of the top 50 female wrestlers in the PWI Female 50 in 2010
- The Baltimore Sun
  - Diva of the Year (2008)
- World Wrestling Entertainment/WWE
  - WWE Women's Championship (2 times)
  - WWE Divas Championship (2 times, inaugural)
  - WWE Hall of Fame (Class of 2025)
  - Slammy Award (2 times)
    - Diva of the Year (2010)
    - Knucklehead Moment of the Year (2010) Losing to Mae Young at Old School Raw – with Layla
  - WWE LFG Championship (Season 2)
