= McKinley (name) =

Family name

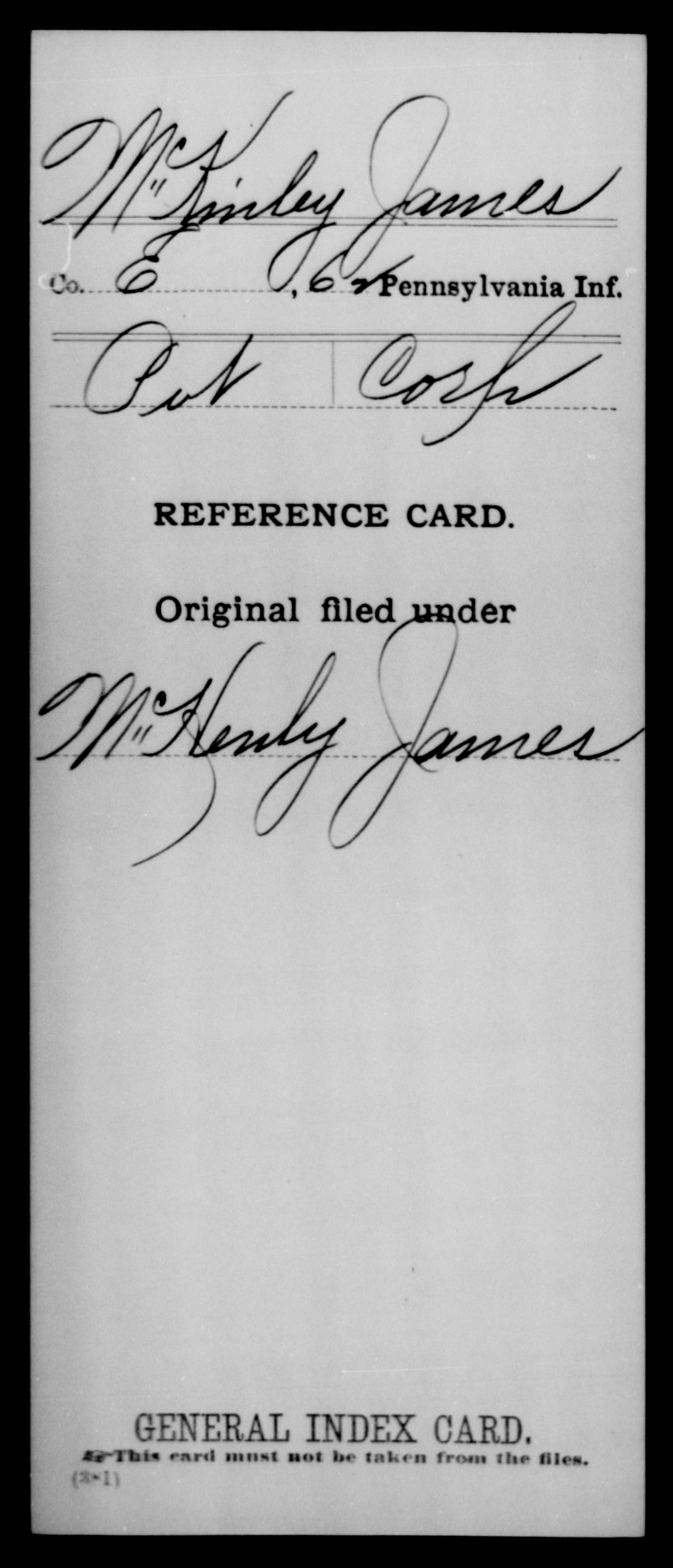

McKinley, MacKinley or Mackinlay is a Scottish and Irish surname historically associated with northwestern Ireland's County Donegal, the over-kingdom of Ulaid in northeastern Ireland and the Scottish Highlands.

One derivation given is that the McKinley are of the ancient Ulaid race and are a branch of its "Red Branch" MacDunleavy (dynasty) royal house of the Dal Fiatach which dominated the kingship of the over-kingdom of Ulaid (original Gaelic language Mac Duinnshléibhe). Etymology for the origins of the surname proposes that the Anglicized surname McKinley, like the surname MacNulty (Gaelic Mac an Ultaigh, trans. "son of the ultonian, ulidian or ulsterman"), arose originally from a Gaelic nickname given the deposed MacDunleavy dynasty royals while exiled in Tirconnell and elsewhere. Being, also, one of Ireland's ancient hereditary medical families, the MacDunleavy (variant English spelling MacDonlevy) were in Tirconnell accorded the high Gaelic status of "ollahm leighis" or the official physicians to the O'Donnell clan in County Donegal and practiced as physicians while exiled in Argyll, Scotland. The nickname was Mac an Leigh. Per this scenario the Gaelic language patronymic forming prefix "Mac" (meaning "descended of") is joined to the Gaelic language "Léigh" meaning leech, but denoting a physician. Leeching having been for millennia, in Gaelic Ireland and elsewhere, a commonly employed medical practice.

Otherwise, the name is said to be of Scottish origin, meaning 'son of Finlay'.

== Notable people with the surname "McKinley" include ==
=== A ===
- Ada S. McKinley (1868–1952), American educator
- Alvin McKinley (born 1978), American football player
- Andrew McKinley (1903–1996), American musician
- Ashley Chadbourne McKinley (1896–1970), American photographer

=== B ===
- Ben McKinley (born 1987), Australian rules footballer
- Bill McKinley (1910–1980), American baseball umpire
- Bill McKinley (footballer) (1882–1952), Australian rules footballer
- Brunson McKinley (born 1943), American diplomat

=== C ===
- Carl McKinley (1895–1966), American composer
- Cedric McKinley (born 1987), American football player
- Charles McKinley (1902–1983), English footballer
- Charlie McKinley (1903–1990), Australian rules footballer
- Chuck McKinley (1941–1986), American tennis player
- Craig McKinley (disambiguation), multiple people

=== D ===
- David McKinley (1947–2026), American politician
- Dennis McKinley (born 1976), American football player
- Dominic McKinley (born 1960), Irish sportsperson

=== E ===
- Elizabeth McKinley, New Zealand academic
- Elliott Miles McKinley (born 1969), American composer

=== G ===
- Galen McKinley, American climatologist
- Gareth H. McKinley, American professor
- George E. McKinley (1872–1941), American politician

=== I ===
- Ian McKinley (born 1989), Irish-Italian rugby union footballer
- Ida Saxton McKinley (1847–1907), American social figure
- Ivan McKinley (born 1969), South African soccer player

=== J ===
- James McKinley (disambiguation), multiple people
- Javon McKinley (born 1998), American football player
- J. C. McKinley (1891–1950), American neurologist
- J. Edward McKinley (1917–2004), American actor
- Jennifer McKinley, Northern Irish scientist
- Jesse McKinley (born 1970), American journalist
- Joanne McKinley (born 1988), Irish cricketer
- John McKinley (1780–1852), American politician
- John C. McKinley (1859–1927), American politician and lawyer
- Joseph H. McKinley Jr. (born 1954), American judge
- Joss McKinley (born 1981), British photographer
- J. W. McKinley (1891–1957), American politician

=== K ===
- Kathryn S. McKinley (born 1962), American computer scientist
- Kelly McKinley, Canadian-American museum curator
- Kenny McKinley (1987–2010), American football player
- Kent McKinley (1898–1972), American politician from Florida

=== L ===
- Larry McKinley (1927–2013), American music promoter
- L. C. McKinley (1918–1970), American guitarist
- Lee McKinley (1906–1986), American politician

=== M ===
- Mairead McKinley (born 1970), Northern Irish actress
- Michael McKinley (born 1954), American diplomat

=== P ===
- Paul McKinley (born 1947), American politician
- Peter McKinley (1811–??), American politician

=== R ===
- Ray McKinley (1910–1995), American musician
- Richard McKinley (1886–1951), American politician
- Robert McKinley (disambiguation), multiple people
- Robin McKinley (born 1952), American author
- Rodney J. McKinley (born 1956), American air force officer
- Ruth Gowdy McKinley (1931–1981), American-Canadian artist
- Richard Malone McKinley {1930-2012}, Professional Boat Racer

=== T ===
- Takkarist McKinley (born 1995), American football player
- Tamara McKinley (born 1948), British-Australian author
- Therese McKinley (1928–2021), American baseball player
- Thomas McKinley (1888–1949), Australian politician

=== V ===
- Vern McKinley, American political advisor
- Verone McKinley III (born 2000), American football player
- Virgil McKinley (1874–1954), American football coach

=== W ===
- Wes McKinley (born 1945), American politician
- William McKinley (disambiguation), multiple people

== Notable people with the given name "McKinley" include ==
- McKinley Bailey (born 1980), American politician
- McKinley Belcher III (born 1984), American actor
- McKinley Blackburn, American economist
- McKinley Boston (born 1945), American academic administrator
- McKinley Boykin (born 1983), American football player
- McKinley Brewer (1896–1955), American baseball player
- McKinley Burnett (1897–1968), American lawyer
- McKinley Crone (born 1998), American professional soccer player
- McKinley Dixon (born 1995), American musician
- McKinley Freeman (born 1973), American actor
- McKinley Hunt (born 1997), Canadian rugby union footballer
- McKinley Mitchell (1934–1986), American singer
- McKinley Moore (born 1998), American baseball player
- McKinley L. Price (born 1949), American politician
- McKinley Singleton (born 1961), American basketball player
- McKinley Tennyson (born 1979), American soccer player
- McKinley Thompson Jr. (1922–2006), American automotive designer
- McKinley Washington Jr. (1936–2022), American politician
- McKinley Wright IV (born 1997), American basketball player

== Fictional characters ==
- Dash McKinley, a character on the Australian television series Blue Heelers
- Ian McKinley, a character from the third installment of the film series Final Destination
- Protagonist in the 1975 Soviet film The Flight of Mr. McKinley
- Beetroot McKinley, a character in the Arnold Schwarzenegger/Danny Devito film "Twins".
- Starbase McKinley, a location in the Star Trek universe.

== See also ==
- MacKinley, a disambiguation page for "MacKinley"
- Senator McKinley (disambiguation), a disambiguation page for Senators surnamed "McKinley"
