= Finlay =

- Gender: Male

Origin
- Origin: Scottish/Irish
- Meaning: Fair Hero

Finlay is a masculine given name, and also a surname. The given name is represented in Scottish Gaelic as Fionnlagh.

== Given name ==
=== Finlay ===
- Finlay Calder, Scottish rugby player
- Finlay Christie (comedian), British comedian
- Finlay Christie, Scottish-born New Zealand rugby player
- Finlay Crerar, Royal Air Force Officer
- Finlay Crisp (1917–1984), Australian academic and political scientist
- Finlay Currie (1878–1968), Scottish actor
- Finlay Freundlich (1885–1964), astronomer
- Finlay Jackson (1901–1941), cricketer and rugby union player
- Finlay Macdonald (minister), Moderator of the General Assembly of the Church of Scotland
- Finlay MacDonald (musician) (born 1978), Scottish bagpiper
- Finlay MacDonald (politician, born 1866) (died 1948), Canadian Member of Parliament for Cape Breton South, Nova Scotia
- Finlay MacDonald (politician, born 1923) (died 2002), Canadian senator
- Finlay J. MacDonald, Scottish journalist
- Finlay McCreath (born 1998), Scottish cricketer
- Finlay McNaughton Young (1852–1916), Canadian Senator
- Finlay Menzies, Scottish para-athlete
- Finlay Mickel, Scottish skier
- Finlay Pollock (born 2004), Scottish footballer
- Finlay Speedie, Scottish footballer
- Finlay Tarling (2006–2026), Welsh cyclist
- Starsmith, British songwriter and music producer born as Finlay Dow-Smith

=== Other spellings ===
- Fionnla Dubh mac Gillechriosd, 15th-century Scotsman
- Fionnlagh MacCailein (died 1419), Scottish bishop
- Findláech of Moray, Macbeth's father, and possible ancestor of the Finlay surname, and its variants

== Surname ==
- Alan Gordon Finlay, (1890–1959), British engineer and inventor
- Alec Finlay (born 1966), Scottish artist
- Alex Finlay (1887–1963), Australian unionist and Senator
- Alexander Struthers Finlay (1807–1886), Scottish Liberal Party politician
- Brogan Finlay (born 2002), Northern Irish-American professional wrestler
- Carlos Finlay (1833–1915), Cuban doctor who first identified mosquitoes as a disease carrier
- Charles Coleman Finlay (born 1964), American science fiction and fantasy writer
- Chase Finlay (born 1990), New York City Ballet dancer
- David Finlay (VC) (1893–1916), Scottish recipient of the Victoria Cross
- David Finlay (wrestler) (born 1993), German-born Northern Irish-American professional wrestler
- David White Finlay (1840–1923), Scottish physician and yachtsman
- Donald Finlay (1909–1970), British athlete
- Dr. Finlay, fictional character created by author A. J. Cronin
- Erwin Finlay-Freundlich (1885–1964), German astronomer and businessman
- Ethan Finlay (born 1990), American soccer player
- Fergus Finlay (born 1950), Irish political figure
- Dave Finlay Sr. (born 1936), Northern Irish professional wrestler
- Fit Finlay (born 1958), Dave "Fit" Finlay, Northern Irish professional wrestler
- Frank Finlay (1926–2016), British stage, film and television actor
- Garfield Finlay (1893–1958), Australian WW1 flying ace
- George Finlay (1799–1875), British historian of classical and post-classical Greece
- Graham Finlay (1936–2018), New Zealand boxer
- Harold John Finlay (1901–1951), New Zealand palaeontologist and conchologist
- Iain Finlay (1935–2025), Australian author and journalist
- Ian Hamilton Finlay (1925–2006), Scottish poet and writer
- Ilora Finlay, Baroness Finlay of Llandaff (born 1949), Welsh physician and member of the House of Lords
- Jack Finlay (1889–1942), Irish hurler and politician
- Jack Finlay (American football) (1921–2014), Los Angeles Rams footballer
- Jaco Finlay (1768–1828), Canadian settler in what is now the US state of Oregon
- Katrina Finlay, character in Monarch of the Glen (TV series)
- Kirkman Finlay (1773–1842), MP, Provost for Glasgow and leading merchant
- Martyn Finlay (1912–1999), New Zealand politician and lawyer
- Mary Lou Finlay (born 1947), Canadian journalist
- Ninian Finlay (1858–1936), Scottish international rugby player
- Onya Hogan-Finlay (born 1977) Canadian artist
- Peter Warren Finlay, the birthname of Australian writer DBC Pierre
- Richard Finlay (1883–1948), Scottish footballer
- Robert Finlay, 1st Viscount Finlay (1842–1929), lord chancellor of Great Britain
- Ross Finlay (1937–2004), Scottish motoring journalist, travel writer, broadcaster and rally co-driver
- Thomas Finlay (Cumann na nGaedheal politician) (1893–1932), Irish Cumann na nGaedhael politician and lawyer
- Thomas Finlay (judge) (1922–2017), Irish Fine Gael politician and former Supreme Court Chief Justice
- Thomas A. Finlay (1848–1940), Irish Catholic priest, economist, philosopher and editor
- Tom Finlay (1987–1967), Irish hurler
- Virgil Finlay (1914–1971), science fiction illustrator
- William Henry Finlay (1849–1924), South African astronomer
