= Finlayson (surname) =

Finlayson is a surname of Scottish origin. It is a patronymic form of the name Finlay.

People surnamed Finlayson include:

- Alan Finlayson, British political and social theorist
- Alex Finlayson (born 1951), American playwright
- Cathryn Finlayson (born 1988), New Zealand Olympic field hockey player
- Charles Finlayson (New Zealand athlete) (1889–1943), New Zealand cricketer and rugby league player
- Charles Finlayson (South African cricketer) (1903–1953)
- Chris Finlayson (born 1956), former New Zealand Attorney-General and MP
- Colin Finlayson (1903–1955), Canadian Olympic rower
- Daniel Finlayson (born 2001), Northern Irish footballer
- George Finlayson (1790–1823), Scottish naturalist and traveller
- Gordon Finlayson, British philosopher
- Graham Finlayson (1932–1999), British photographer
- Hedley Herbert Finlayson (1895–1991), Australian mammalogist
- Hugh Finlayson (1810–1889), Ontario businessman and politician
- Iain Finlayson (journalist) (1951–1990), British Olympic Alpine skier
- Innes Finlayson (1889–1980), New Zealand Rugby union player
- James Finlayson (industrialist) (1771–1852), Scottish industrialist
- James Finlayson (actor) (1887–1953), Scottish-American actor
- Jeremy Finlayson (born 1996), Australian rules football player
- John Harvey Finlayson (1843–1915), South Australian newspaper editor
- Roderick David Finlayson (1904–1992), New Zealand architectural draughtsman and writer
- Rob Finlayson, Manitoba judge
- William Finlayson (Australian politician) (1867–1955), Australian politician
- William Finlayson (Canadian politician) (1875–?), cabinet minister in Ontario
- William Finlayson (churchman) (1813–1897), South Australian pioneer

== See also ==
- Finlayson (disambiguation)
- Finlay (disambiguation)
- MacKinley
- McKinley (surname)
