= David Finlay =

David Finlay or Dave Finlay may refer to:

== Wrestling family ==
Three generations of professional wrestlers of this name from the same family:

- David Finlay (wrestler) (born 1993), German-born Northern Irish professional wrestler.
- Brogan Finlay (born 2002), American professional wrestler.
- Fit Finlay (born 1958), also known as Dave Finlay, Northern Irish wrestling trainer and professional wrestler and father of David Finlay and Brogan Finlay
- Dave Finlay Sr., Northern Irish wrestling coach, professional wrestler and promoter, father of Fit Finlay and grandfather of David Finlay and Brogan Finlay

== Other ==
- David Finlay (VC) (1893–1916), Scottish recipient of the Victoria Cross
- David White Finlay (1840–1923), Scottish physician and yachtsman

== See also ==
- David Finley (disambiguation)
