= Charles Finlayson =

Charles Finlayson may refer to:

- Charles Finlayson (South African cricketer) (1903–1953)
- Charles Finlayson (New Zealand athlete) (1889–1943), New Zealand rugby league and cricket player
