= Carrick Paul =

New Zealand flying ace

Carrick Stewart Paul
- Born: 5 February 1893; Thames, New Zealand
- Died: 22 January 1919 (aged 25); At sea
- Burial place: Chatby Memorial, Egypt
- Military career
- Allegiance: British Empire
- Branch: Australian Flying Corps; Australian Army
- Rank: Lieutenant
- Units: 6th Light Horse Regiment (AIF); No. 1 Squadron, Australian Flying Corps
- Awards: Distinguished Flying Cross; Mention in Despatches

Lieutenant Carrick Stewart Paul DFC (5 February 1893 – 22 January 1919 was a World War I flying ace from New Zealand. He was credited with five aerial victories in Palestine between May and August 1918 when flying a Bristol F.2 Fighter.

== Biography ==
Carrick Paul was born at Thames in New Zealand on 5 February 1893. After the outbreak of the First World War he enlisted in the Australian Imperial Force, and was posted to the 6th Light Horse Regiment. In April 1916, he was mentioned in despatches. He later transferred to the Australian Flying Corps and served in the Sinai and Palestine campaign.

Flying a Bristol F.2 fighter, Paul claimed two victories on 23 May 1918, near Nablus. One of the two Albatros D.Vs was piloted by German ace Gustav Schneidewind, who was wounded in both arms. Paul then destroyed Rumpler reconnaissance planes on 13 June, 28 July, and 16 August 1918. The July win was shared with Alan Brown and Garfield Finlay.

Paul and his observer William Weir were jointly awarded the Distinguished Flying Cross (DFC) on 8 February 1919. Paul never knew of the honor; while on the voyage home to New Zealand, he drowned on 22 January 1919.

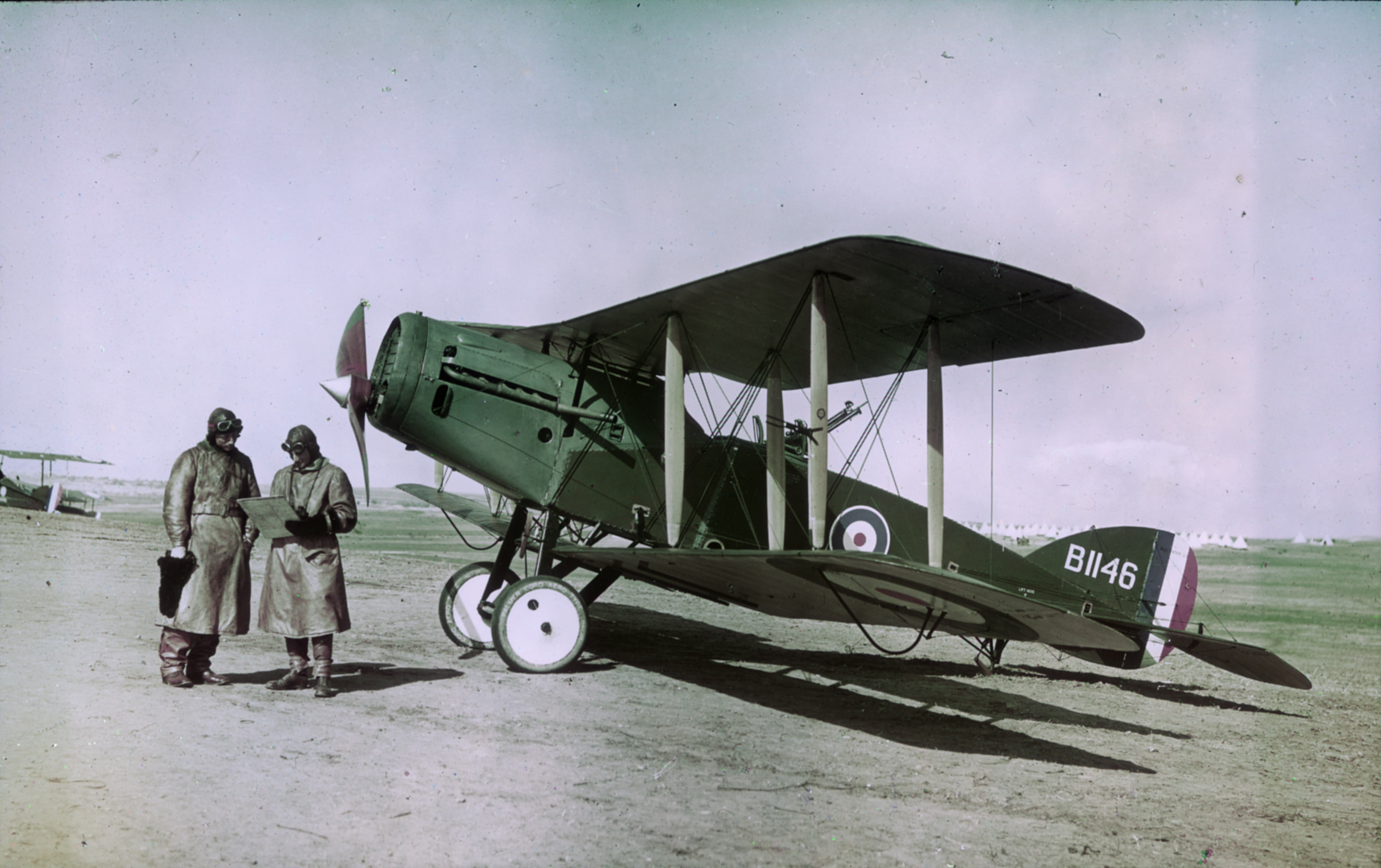
A pilot and his observer standing next to a No. 1 Squadron Bristol Fighter in Palestine, February 1918

The announcement of his DFC was made in The London Gazette. The published citation read:

Lieutenant Paul is a gallant and skilful Pilot, who has been very ably assisted by his Observer, Lieutenant Weir. These officers have shown great initiative in attacking ground objectives on numerous occasions, notably on 14 August, when, in face of intense hostile fire, they, at a very low altitude, attacked bodies of enemy cavalry, causing heavy casualties. They have also displayed great courage and skill in air combats, having destroyed four enemy aircraft.

— London Gazette, No. 31170, 8 February 1919.

Paul is listed on the Chatby Memorial, in Alexandria, Egypt, which commemorates military personnel of the Commonwealth who died at sea during the First World War and have no known grave.
