= MacKinley =

MacKinley is a surname. It is an Anglicization of the Gaelic language Mac an Léigh and varies from that Gaelic language surname's other Anglicization, McKinley, in that only the Gaelic language element Léigh and not, also, the Gaelic language patronymic forming prefix element Mac is anglicized by contraction. The MacKinley are a branch of the MacDonlevy (dynasty) royals of Gaelic Ireland.

Notable people with the surname include:

- Ron MacKinley, Canadian politician

== See also ==
- McKinley
- Finlayson (disambiguation)
- Finlay (disambiguation)
