= Mel Gussow =

Theater critic (1933–2005)

- Born: Melvyn Hayes Gussow; December 19, 1933; New York City, New York, U.S.
- Died: April 29, 2005 (aged 71); New York City, New York, U.S.
- Occupations: Theater critic, movie critic, author
- Notable credit(s): The New York Times; Newsweek; Army newspaper Heidelberg, Germany
- Spouse: Ann Meredith Beebe Gussow (19??–2005; his death)
- Children: 1

Melvyn Hayes "Mel" Gussow (GUSS-owe; December 19, 1933 – April 29, 2005) was an American theater critic, movie critic, and author who wrote for The New York Times for 35 years.

== Biography ==
Gussow was born in New York City and grew up in Rockville Centre, Long Island. He attended South Side High School, and Middlebury College, where he served as editor of The Campus, and graduated in 1955 with a BA degree in American literature. He earned an MA from the Columbia University Graduate School of Journalism in 1956.

Gussow was a writer for the Army newspaper in Heidelberg, Germany, where he was stationed for two years. He was hired by Newsweek, where he became a movie and theater critic. His first Broadway play review was of Who's Afraid of Virginia Woolf? in 1962. This review began a lifelong relationship with the play's author, Edward Albee, that included Gussow's 1999 biography of the playwright entitled Edward Albee: A Singular Journey.

Gussow joined the New York Times in 1969 and over his 35-year career wrote more than 4,000 of the newspaper's reviews and articles. He authored eight books, including a series of four which were considered "conversations" with playwrights Arthur Miller, Samuel Beckett, Harold Pinter, and Tom Stoppard. Times arts reporter Jesse McKinley notes that Gussow's interview collections became "staples of college drama curriculums and the libraries of gossip-loving theater fans".

In the late 1960s and in 1970, he and his wife Ann and son Ethan, actor Dustin Hoffman, and several other families lived in apartments in a townhouse at 16 West 11th Street. On March 6, 1970, the townhouse next door to theirs was destroyed by an explosion of dynamite that killed three and injured two members of the Weathermen organization. In an article written by Gussow on the 30th anniversary of the disaster, Gussow reported an FBI finding that "had all the explosives detonated, the explosion would have leveled everything on both sides of the street." He and his family remained residents of Greenwich Village after the explosion, maintaining a home on West 10th Street.

Gussow was married to Ann, who survived him, along with their son Ethan, who married Susan Baldomar in 1998.

== Death ==
Gussow died on April 29, 2005, at New York-Presbyterian Hospital from bone cancer at the age of 71. He had kept working until just three weeks before his death, writing at that time an obituary along with New York Times colleague Charles McGrath of Canadian-born Pulitzer Prize-winning writer Saul Bellow.

In 2008, Gussow was inducted posthumously into the American Theater Hall of Fame at the same time as actor and playwright Harvey Fierstein, the actors John Cullum, Lois Smith and Dana Ivey, the director Jack O'Brien, the playwright Peter Shaffer, and the librettist Joseph Stein.

== Archive ==
The papers and audio/video recordings of Mel Gussow were gifted to the Harry Ransom Center at the University of Texas at Austin in 2009. The extensive collection of over 200 boxes consists of article and manuscript drafts, interview notes and transcripts, correspondence, scrapbooks, photographs, subject files, clippings, and published material. More than 900 sound recordings of Gussow's interviews with actors, playwrights, writers, and directors are held in the Ransom Center's Sound Recordings Collection. In 2018, the Ransom Center began releasing the interviews online as part of their digital collections.
