= Gustav Schneidewind =

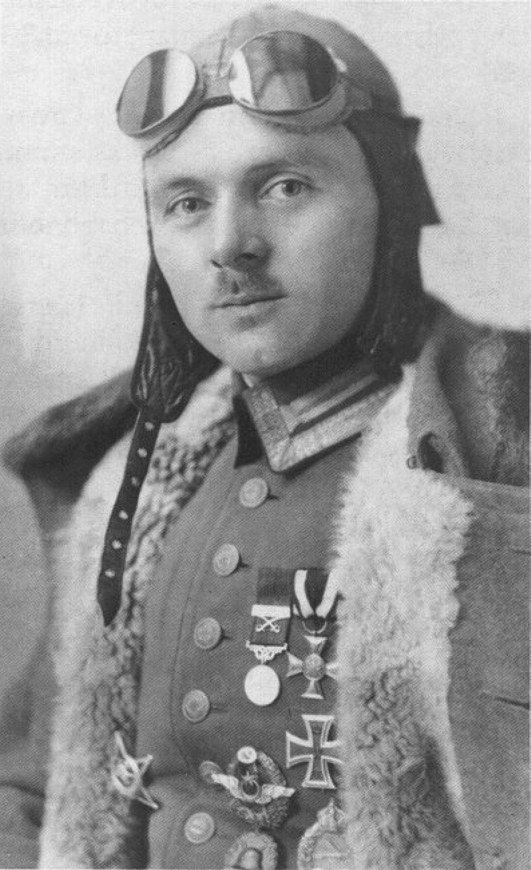
- Born: 28 August 1890; Kingdom of Prussia in the German Empire
- Died: Unknown
- Military career
- Allegiance: Germany
- Branch: Luftstreitkräfte (Aviation)
- Rank: Vizefeldwebel
- Units: Flieger-Abteilung (Flier Detachment) 29, Jagdstaffel (Fighter Squadron) 17, Jagdstaffel (Fighter Squadron) 1, Flieger-Abteilung (Flier Detachment) 305
- Awards: Gold award of the Military Merit Cross, Iron Cross Second and First Class, Turkish War Medal

Vizefeldwebel Gustav Schneidewind was a World War I flying ace credited with seven aerial victories.

== Biography ==
Gustav Schneidewind was born on 28 August 1890, in the Kingdom of Prussia. He began his military service in the German Army in the 97th Infantry Regiment on 13 October 1911. As World War I erupted, he served in the 25th Pioneer Regiment. On 7 January 1915, he became an Unteroffizier.

He transferred to aviation duty on 1 August 1916. He attended pilot's training at Großenhain. Once trained, he was forwarded for duty with Flieger-Abteilung (Flier Detachment) 29 on 3 May 1917. However, on 4 June 1917, he returned to pilot's training, this time to Jastaschule (Fighter School). On 17 June, he was posted to a fighter squadron, Jagdstaffel 17. He scored his first aerial victory on 21 July; at 1530 hours, he shot down a Sopwith Pup from No. 66 Squadron Royal Flying Corps over Noordschote.

On 10 August 1917, he received a promotion to Vizefeldwebel. He would be credited with three more victories over British aircraft, on 14 and 21 September, and 1 December.

With the turn of the year, Schneidewind changed theaters; from service on the Western Front, he was transferred to the Middle East. He was posted to Jadgstaffel 55 on 7 January 1918, joining them in Palestine. He shot down enemy observation balloons on consecutive days, 8 and 9 May 1918. He was credited with an enemy aircraft later that month. However, on 23 May, he was seriously wounded in action, taking bullets through both arms. He was claimed as a victory by Carrick Paul and William Weir, who were crewing a Bristol F.2 Fighter.

On 28 May 1918, Gustav Schneidewind was awarded the Prussian Golden Military Merit Cross and Turkish War Medal to accompany his previous awards of both classes of the Iron Cross. He returned to Germany, and later served in a reconnaissance unit, Flieger-Abteilung (Flier Detachment) 305.
