= Garfield Finlay =

- Born: 7 September 1893; Glebe, New South Wales
- Died: 1958
- Military career
- Allegiance: Australia
- Branch: Australian Imperial Force; Australian Flying Corps; Royal Australian Air Force
- Service years: 1915–1919 c.1940–1945
- Rank: Wing Commander
- Units: 12th Light Horse Regiment; No. 1 Squadron AFC
- Awards: Distinguished Flying Cross; Mentioned in Despatches

Edgar Garfield Finlay, DFC (7 September 1893 – 18 April 1958) was an Australian flying ace of the First World War. He served with distinction in the Gallipoli Campaign as a noncommissioned officer in the Light Horse. After transferring to the Australian Flying Corps, he was commissioned and served as an aerial observer. In this role he was credited with eight aerial victories before training as a pilot.

After a civilian career in the advertising industry between the wars, he returned to service during the Second World War, rising to the rank of wing commander in the Royal Australian Air Force.

== Early life ==
Garfield Finlay was born on 7 September 1893 in Glebe, New South Wales. His mother was Elizabeth Finlay (formerly Munro). Prior to the First World War, he lived in West Perth, Western Australia and worked as a wool-classer. Before enlisting he had a successful swimming career, winning six Australian breaststroke titles between 1909 and 1914, including a world record in the 220 yards breaststroke at the 1912 titles at City Baths in Perth. In 1911, he won the Australian breaststroke championship and the international King's Cup of the Royal Life Saving Society in London. The King of Sweden invited him to Sweden where he won the Swedish championships, receiving two magnificent solid silver cups engraved with Primus Bland Simmagistrar 1911. He served two years in the Mounted Police before enlisting in the Australian Imperial Force on 22 January 1915. At the time of enlistment, he was working as a labourer.

== First World War ==
Finlay joined "B" Squadron, 12th Light Horse Regiment, 4th Light Horse Brigade on 22 January 1915. He was living in Darlinghurst at the time, and listed his mother Elizabeth living in Perth as his next of kin. On 13 June 1915, Finlay was a corporal when he embarked on HMAT Suevic to depart Sydney. He was promoted to sergeant in October. He served with distinction in the Gallipoli Campaign, rising to the rank of staff sergeant major. As the campaign came to an end, he was attached to the 7th Light Horse Regiment, and was recommended for a Mention in Despatches for his actions as one of the last 25 men evacuated from the peninsula. He was returned to the 12th Light Horse on 21 February 1916.

Finlay then served and served in a machine gun section of the Imperial Camel Corps. He was commissioned in March 1917. A visit to a friend serving in the Royal Flying Corps sparked Finlay's transfer to aviation in July 1917. He remained in the Middle East, being assigned to No. 1 Squadron AFC. On 29 November 1917, he scored his first aerial victory while flying as an aerial observer in a Royal Aircraft Factory RE.8.

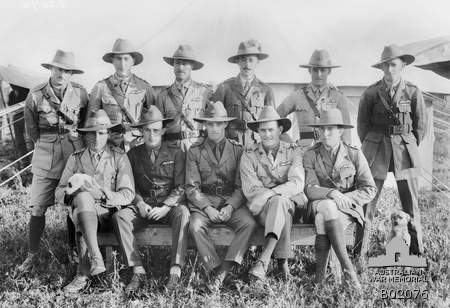
A group of officers from No. 1 Squadron, AFC. Finlay is in the front row, second from the right

Finlay was wounded twice by anti-aircraft shrapnel on a flight that took place between 10 January and 20 January. On 1 February 1918, The Sydney Morning Herald reported Lieutenant Garfield Finlay as being wounded in action but remaining on duty, with no date given for the wounding. Finlay scored his second confirmed victory on 29 March 1918, and would run his victory tally to eight confirmed and eight more unconfirmed by 22 August 1918.

Finlay's aerial victories came during the Allied drive for air superiority over Axis pilots flying for the Ottoman Empire. While Australian and British pilots fought aerial battles when necessary, their emphasis was on reconnaissance for Allied ground troops, destruction of enemy aircraft and aviation facilities, and other ground attack missions on enemy infantry and cavalry. In this Allied airmen were so successful that they were virtually without air opposition when they supported Allenby's final smashing drive at the Battle of Megiddo. There were several instances during this drive of Turkish units being mauled into collapse by Allied air power.

On 21 September 1918, as part of the Megiddo action, Garfield Finlay, his pilot Alan Brown, and another air crew discovered that several miles of the road leading out of Balata was crowded with Ottoman transport and troops retreating from Allenby's army. The two air crews bombed the front and rear of the column, immobilizing it. A radio message back to their airfield brought on follow-up air strikes. One Allied bomber squadron flew six bombing sorties. Forty-four thousand rounds of machine gun ammunition were expended during the raids. Constrained by cliffs on one side of the ancient Roman highway and trackless hills on the other, the Turks suffered heavy casualties. Friendly ground forces sweeping the area later found about 800 horse-drawn wagons abandoned along the road, along with 90 artillery pieces, 50 lorries, and half a dozen automobiles, along with assorted water carts and field kitchens. This notable action was mentioned in Finlay's award citation for the Distinguished Flying Cross, for which he was recommended on 2 October 1918. In his career as an observer, Finlay was credited with eight confirmed aerial victories, before undertaking pilot training late in the war.

== Post-war ==
Garfield Finlay's Distinguished Flying Cross would not be gazetted until 8 February 1919, in conjunction with Alan Brown:

On 22nd August (1918) Captain Brown, with Lieutenant Finlay as his observer, attacked an enemy two-seater, forcing it to land in our lines. On four other occasions these officers have engaged and destroyed enemy aircraft, displaying marked gallantry and skill. In addition, they have rendered most valuable service in attacking enemy cavalry, antiaircraft guns and other ground targets, inflicting heavy loss.

Another belated honour was a Mention in Despatches for his services in the Egyptian Expeditionary Force, which would not come until 12 January 1920.

Once released to civilian life in March 1919, Finlay spent ten years in the United States, working in advertising. He was an entrepreneur who tried many business ideas including flying box kites advertising Lucky Strike cigarettes in the US. He brought the American idea of advertising on bus stops to Australia as well as the fedora hat. He returned to military service at the beginning of the Second World War; a 24 February 1940 news article mentions him serving as the adjutant of a Royal Australian Air Force training depot at Laverton, ranked as a flying officer. He would rise to the rank of wing commander, serving in the 1st Tactical Air Force's headquarters before being discharged on 16 July 1945.

On 21 April 1949 he dissolved a partnership in a popcorn company in Western Australia, with the intent of continuing it as an individual enterprise. After World War II, he also set up a potato crisp and salted roasted peanut factory in Williamtown, Melbourne where he manufactured Finlay's chips and peanuts until his death in 1958. He was a heavy smoker and nicotine stains can be seen on his fingers in photographs, even when he was a young man in World War I.

== Personal ==
He married Emily Elizabeth Stein. Finlay died of a heart attack on 18 April 1958, aged 65 and was cremated at Spring Vale Crematorium.

== List of aerial victories ==
Confirmed victories are numbered and listed chronologically. Unconfirmed victories are denoted by "u/c".

Combat record
No.	Date/time	Aircraft	Foe	Result	Location	Notes
1	29 November 1917 @ 0830 hours	Royal Aircraft Factory RE.8 (A4408)	Albatros D.III	Driven down out of control	South-west of Samaria	Pilot: Lt. R. A. Austin
u/c	29 November 1917	Royal Aircraft Factory RE.8 (A4408)	Albatros D.III	Driven down out of control	Tulkarm	
2	27 March 1918 @ 0710 hours	Bristol F.2b Fighter (B1140)	AEG two-seater	Forced to land; destroyed	Kissir (south of Amman)	Pilot: Lt. J. M. Walker. Shared with Capt. D. W. Rutherford & Lt J. McElligott.
u/c	2 May 1918	Bristol F.2b Fighter (B1149)	Enemy two-seater	Driven down	Suweilah	
3	3 May 1918 @ 0700 hours	Bristol F.2b Fighter (B1149)	Enemy two-seater	Forced to land; destroyed	Southwest of Suweilah	Pilot: Allan Brown. Shared with Lt. G. V. Oxenham & Lt. H. A. Leach.
4	9 May 1918 @ 1515 hours	Bristol F.2b Fighter (C4623)	Rumpler two-seater	Forced to land; destroyed	Jenin Airfield	Pilot: George Peters
5	27 June 1918 @ 0645 hours	Bristol F.2b Fighter (B1149)	AEG two-seater	Destroyed	El Kutrani	Pilot: Allan Brown
u/c	27 June 1918	Bristol F.2b Fighter (B1149)	AEG two-seater	Forced to land	El Kutrani	
6	28 June 1918 @ 0630 hours	Bristol F.2b Fighter (B1149)	Albatros D.V fighter	Set afire; destroyed	Amman	Pilot: Lt. S. A. Numan. Shared with Carrick Paul and William Weir.
u/c	3 July 1918	Bristol F.2b Fighter (B1149)	AEG two-seater	Forced to land	Al-Lubban Dan	Pilot: Allan Brown
u/c	16 July 1918	Bristol F.2 Fighter (B1284)	Albatros D.V	Forced to land	Tulkarm	
u/c	16 July 1918	Bristol F.2 Fighter (B1284)	Albatros D.V	Forced to land	Tulkarm	
u/c	16 July 1918	Bristol F.2 Fighter (B1284)	Albatros D.V	Forced to land	Tulkarm	
u/c	16 July 1918	Bristol F.2 Fighter (B1284)	Albatros D.V	Forced to land	Tulkarm	
7	28 July 1918 @ 1200 hours	Bristol F.2b Fighter (B1284)	Rumpler two-seater	Forced to land; destroyed	North of Wadi Fareh	Pilot: Allan Brown. Shared with of Carrick Paul and William Weir.
8	22 August 1918 @ 1315 hours	Bristol F.2b Fighter	LVG two-seater	Captured	Ramleh	Pilot: Allan Brown

== Australian Swimming Championships ==
Year	Venue	Event	Time
1909	Municipal Baths, Domain, Sydney	220 yards breaststroke	3 minutes 17 1-5 sec
1911	Municipal Baths, Domain, Sydney	220 yards breaststroke	3 minutes 16 1-5 sec
1912	City Baths, Adelaide	100 yards breaststroke	1 minute 17 secs
1912	City Baths, Perth	220 yards breaststroke	3 minutes 12 secs
1914	South Brisbane Baths	220 yards breaststroke	3 minutes 10 secs
1914	Municipal Baths, Domain, Sydney	100 yards breaststroke	1 minute 15 3-5 secs

== Bibliography ==
- Cutlack, Frederic Morley (1941). The Australian Flying Corps: In the Western and Eastern Theatres of War, 1914–1918: Volume 8 of Official history of Australia in the War of 1914–1918 (11th ed.). Angus & Robertson. OCLC 220900299.
- Franks, Norman; Guest, Russell F. & Alegi, Gregory (1997). Above the War Fronts: The British Two-seater Bomber Pilot and Observer Aces, the British Two-seater Fighter Observer Aces, and the Belgian, Italian, Austro-Hungarian and Russian Fighter Aces, 1914–1918. London, UK: Grub Street. ISBN 978-1-898697-56-5.
- Hollis, Kenneth (2008). Thunder of the Hooves: A History of 12 Australian Light Horse Regiment 1915–1919. Loftus, New South Wales: Australian Military History Publications. ISBN 978-0-9803796-5-5.
