= Tumbulgum =

Village in New South Wales, Australia

- Town
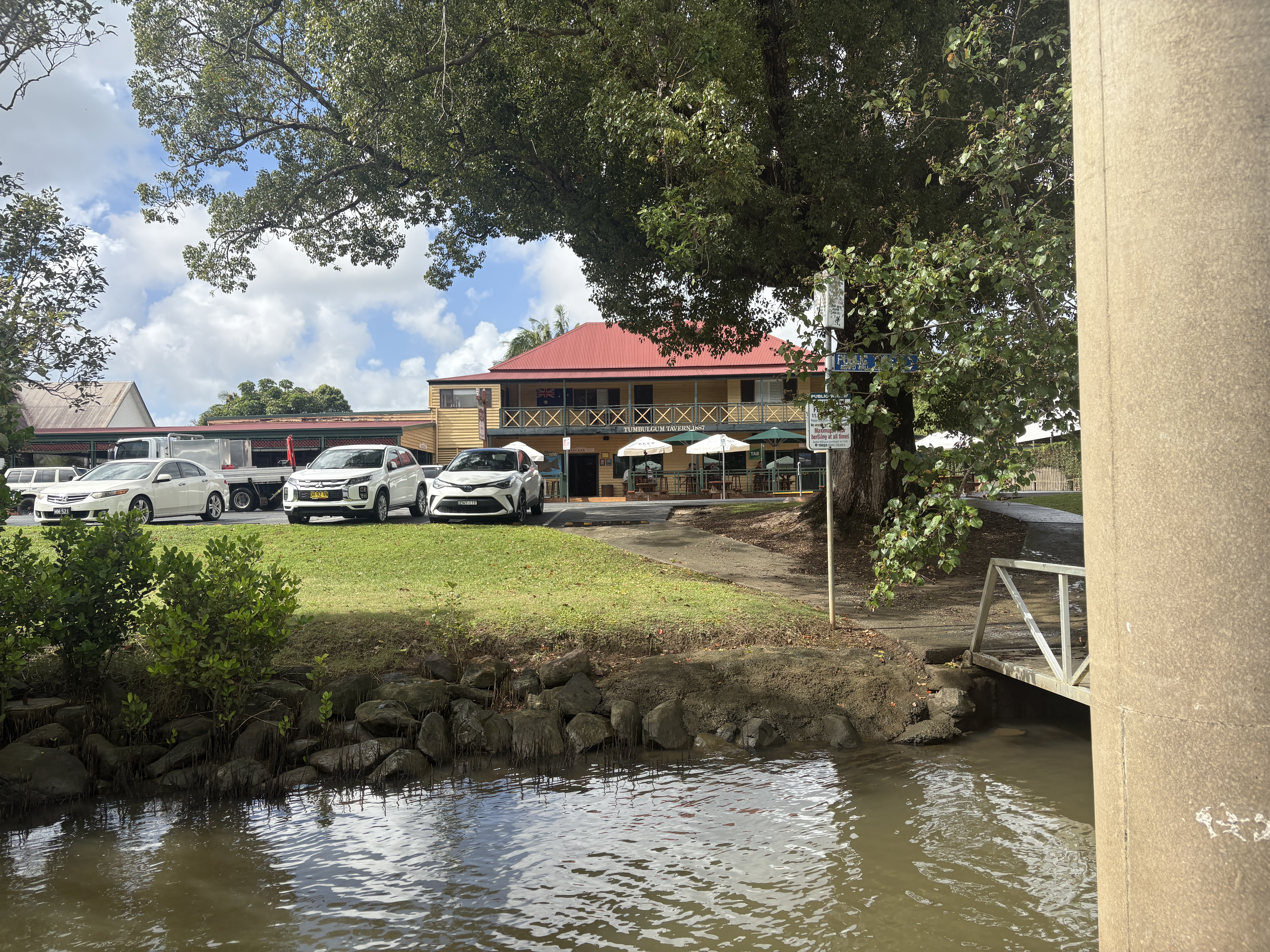
- Tumbulgum Tavern, 2026

- Coordinates: 28°17′0″S 153°29′0″E
- Country: Australia
- State: New South Wales
- LGA: Tweed Shire
- Location: 818 km (508 mi) NE of Sydney; 120 km (75 mi) SE of Brisbane; 18 km (11 mi) SW of Tweed Heads; 11 km (6.8 mi) NE of Murwillumbah

Government
  - State electorate: Tweed
  - Federal division: Richmond
- Elevation: 4 m (13 ft)

Population
  - Total: 382 (UCL 2021)
- Postcode: 2490
Localities around Tumbulgum
North Tumbulgum	North Tumbulgum	Terranora
Dungay	Tumbulgum	Stotts Creek
Condong	Eviron	Duranbah

Tumbulgum (/tʌmbəlɡʌm/ TUM-bəl-gum) is a village in northern New South Wales, Australia. It is in the Tweed Shire local government area, at the confluence of the Rous and Tweed Rivers. It is 818 kilometres (508 mi) north east of the state capital, Sydney and 120 kilometres (75 mi) south east of Brisbane.

The Ngandowal and Minyungbal speaking people of the Bundjalung people are the traditional owners of the Tweed region, including Tumbulgum, and the surrounding areas.

At the 2021 census, Tumbulgum had a population of 382.

== Origin of place name ==
The place name Tumbulgum comes from the Bundjalung language and is thought to either mean 'meeting of the waters' or be from a combination of the words 'tumbul' or 'chumal' which mean fig tree.

European settlers to the region first called this area 'Tweed River Junction' or 'The Junction'. These names were used until 1880 when the name of the post office was changed to the name Tumbulgum following petitions from local residents.

== History ==
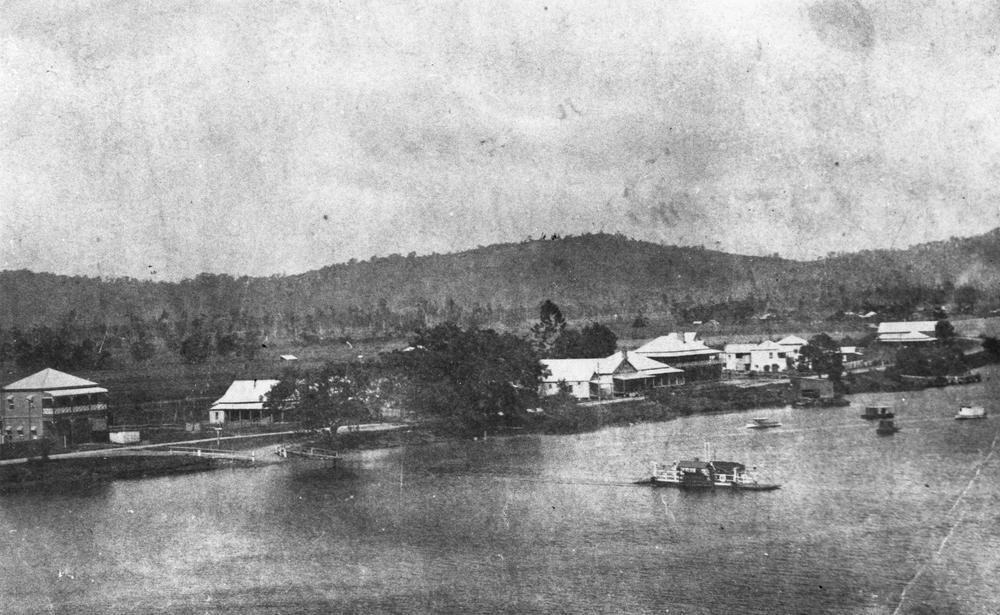
Punt crossing Tweed River at Tumbulgum, ca. 1910

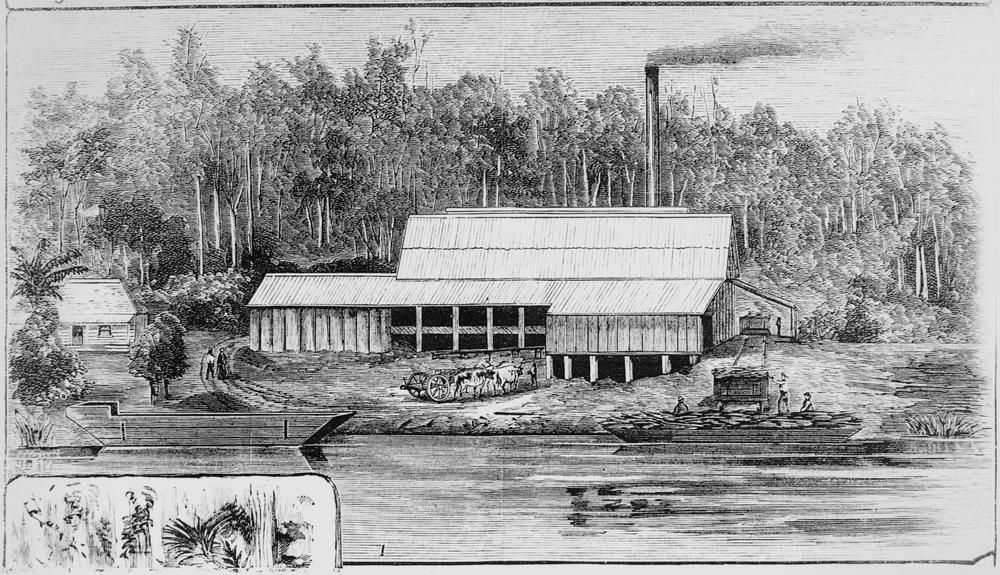
The Abbotsford Sugar Mill, Tumbulgum, 1881

In the 1880s Tumbulgum was the principal town in the Tweed Valley with an active commercial sector, including a bank. It was not until construction of the Murwillumbah railway line to Lismore in 1897 and the Murwillumbah Bridge in 1901 that Murwillumbah supplanted Tumbulgum as the major centre on the Tweed.

The Australian red cedar growing in the Tumbulgum area attracted timber-cutters from the 1840s and by the early 1860s a small community and river port had been established on the northern side of the Tweed River where it met the Rous. By 1885, the town had mostly moved to the southern bank of the Tweed.

There is general acceptance among the Tweed Aboriginal community of the presence of three main groups in the Tweed River Valley. These were the Goodjinburra people for the Tweed Coastal area, the Tul-gi-gin people for the North Arm (Rous), and the Moorang-Moobar people for the Southern and Central Arms around Wollumbin (Mt Warning).

Tumbulgum history timeline:

- 31 October 1823, John Oxley discovers the Tweed River.
- 1842 Cedar Getters arrive on the Tweed River.
- 1866 the first land selectors arrived on the Tweed River and river port of Tweed Junction established.
- 1 March 1881, name changed from Tweed Junction to Tumbulgum
- 26 January 1883, Baker's Farm Auction enabled development of current village site
- 24 December 1894, Murwillumbah Railway line opened. Murwillumbah replaces Tumbulgum as the commercial centre of the Tweed.
- July 1936, Barney's Point Bridge, Chinderah opens to traffic from Murwillumbah to Tweed Heads. Bypassing Tumbulgum Road and North Tumbulgum.
- 1973, Pacific Highway bypasses Tumbulgum enabling the development of Riverside Drive.
- 20 December 1986, Alexander Twohill Bridge opens replacing the Tumbulgum Ferry.
- 4 August 2002, Yelgun-Chinderah Freeway opens, the old highway route renamed Tweed Valley Way.

The Tumbulgum Heritage Trail was established in 2013. Permanent signs depicting life in Tumbulgum's past, have been installed at 12 sites identified of historical significance. The Trail is a flat walk and takes approx 40–50 minutes. Map of the Trail is displayed in the window of the Community Hall.

Tumbulgum was evacuated and a number of buildings destroyed in the 2022 eastern Australia floods.

== Today ==
Tumbulgum is now an historic village with many buildings—some constructed from the local red cedar—having National Heritage classification, including the Tumbulgum Hotel. As well as the hotel, facilities include a General Store, newsagency, post office, cafes, restaurants and an antiques store. It a popular fishing and boating destination.

Within Tumbulgum and North Tumbulgum are environmental treasures: Stotts Island Nature Reserve, containing a 77 hectares (190 acres) example of lowland sub-tropical rainforest, Duroby Nature Reserve and Skinners Reserve. Tumbulgum itself is both an historic and contemporary hidden gem, tucked away off the busy Tweed Valley Way. In 2010, Tumbulgum became the third place in New South Wales to ban the provision by retail outlets to customers of free disposable plastic shopping bags.

To commemorate 150 years of European settlement at Tumbulgum, a rock monument was placed at Bluey Hill Park in 2016.

== Demographics ==
In the 2011 census, Tumbulgum recorded a population of 383 people, 50.4% female and 49.6% male.

The median age of the Tumbulgum population was 42 years, 5 years above the national median of 37.

78.1% of people living in Tumbulgum were born in Australia. The other top responses for country of birth were England 5.7%, New Zealand 2.1%, Wales 1.3%, Philippines 1%, Denmark 1%.

87.7% of people spoke only English at home; the next most common languages were 1.6% Dutch, 1% German, 1% Italian, 0.8% Greek.

== Notable people ==
- Faith Bandler, civil rights activist
- Iain Finlay, news correspondent
- Jim Rutherford, rugby league footballer
