= David Finley =

David Finley may refer to:

- David E. Finley (1861–1917), United States Representative from South Carolina
- David E. Finley Jr. (1890–1977), first director of the National Gallery of Art
- David Crockett (wrestling) (born 1946), also known as Dave Finley, former professional wrestling announcer and executive

== See also ==
- David Finlay (disambiguation)
