= Findlay =

Findlay may refer to:

== Places ==
=== United States ===
- Findlay, Georgia, an unincorporated community
- Findlay, Illinois, a village
- Findlay, Ohio, a city
- Findlay Township, Pennsylvania, a civil township

=== Other places ===
- Findlay, Manitoba, a locality within the Rural Municipality of Sifton, Manitoba, Canada

== Schools ==
- Arthur Findlay College, Essex, England
- Findlay High School, Findlay, Ohio, U.S.
- University of Findlay, Findlay, Ohio, U.S.

== Others ==
- Findlay Freedom, hockey team in Findlay, Ohio, U.S.
- Findlay Market, public market in Cincinnati, Ohio, U.S.
- Russell Findlay (businessman), (1965–), American marketer and first Chief Marketing Officer of Major League Soccer
- A sept of the Scottish Clan Farquharson
- Findlay (musician), English musician
- Findlay (surname)

== See also ==
- Finlay (disambiguation)
- Finley (disambiguation)
