= William McKinley (disambiguation) =

William McKinley (1843–1901) was the 25th president of the United States from 1897 to 1901.

William McKinley may also refer to:

- William McKinley (Virginia politician) (fl. 19th century), U.S. representative from Virginia (1810–1811)
- William B. McKinley (1856–1926), U.S. representative and senator from Illinois
- William Laird McKinlay (1889–1983), author of his own survivor's account of the Last voyage of the Karluk
- William Michael McKinley (1879–1964), speaker of the Illinois House of Representatives
- William Thomas McKinley (1938–2015), American composer and jazz pianist
- William McKinley Sr. (1807–1892), American manufacturer, father of President William McKinley
- Bill McKinley (1910–1980), American baseball umpire in the American League, 1946–1965
- Bill McKinley (footballer) (1882–1952), American rules footballer
- SS William McKinley, a Liberty ship

== See also ==
- Billy McKinlay (born 1969), Scottish footballer and manager
- William McKinlay (fl. 1860s–1870s), South Carolina tailor and state legislator
- Jazz Gillum (William McKinley Gillum, 1904–1966), harmonica player
