= Finlay (disambiguation) =

Finlay is a given name and a family name.

Finlay may also refer to:

- 15P/Finlay, Comet Finlay
- Finlay (band), a British indie rock band from London
- Dave Finlay, an Irish born professional wrestler.
- Finlay & Co., a British manufacturer of upmarket sunglasses.
- BD−17 63 b, an exoplanet named Finlay

== See also ==
- Findlay (disambiguation)
- Finley (disambiguation)
- Finlay River
