= Finlayson =

Finlayson may refer to:

People:

- Finlayson (surname)

Places:

- Finlayson (district), Tampere, Finland
- Finlayson, Minnesota, United States
- Finlayson Township, Pine County, Minnesota, United States
- Finlayson Lake Airport in Yukon, Canada
- Finlayson Island, an island in the North Saskatchewan River, Saskatchewan, Canada
- Finlayson Islands, an archipelago in Nunavut, Canada

In fiction:

- Baby Face Finlayson, a fictional character in the UK comic strip The Beano

Other:

- Finlayson (company), a Finnish textile company

== See also ==
- Finlay (disambiguation)
- Finlayson & Co, cotton mill founded by James Finlayson (industrialist) in Tampere, Finland
