= Senator McKinley =

Senator McKinley may refer to:

== Members of the United States Senate ==
- John McKinley (1780–1852), U.S. Senator from Alabama
- William B. McKinley (1856–1926), U.S. Senator from Illinois

== United States state senate members ==
- J. W. McKinley (1891–1957), California State Senate
- Paul McKinley (born 1947), Iowa State Senate
