= North Tumbulgum =

- Town
- Coordinates: 28°15′43″S 153°28′18″E
- Country: Australia
- State: New South Wales
- LGA: Tweed Shire

Government
  - State electorate: Tweed
  - Federal division: Richmond

Population
  - Total: 238 (2021 census)
- Postcode: 2490

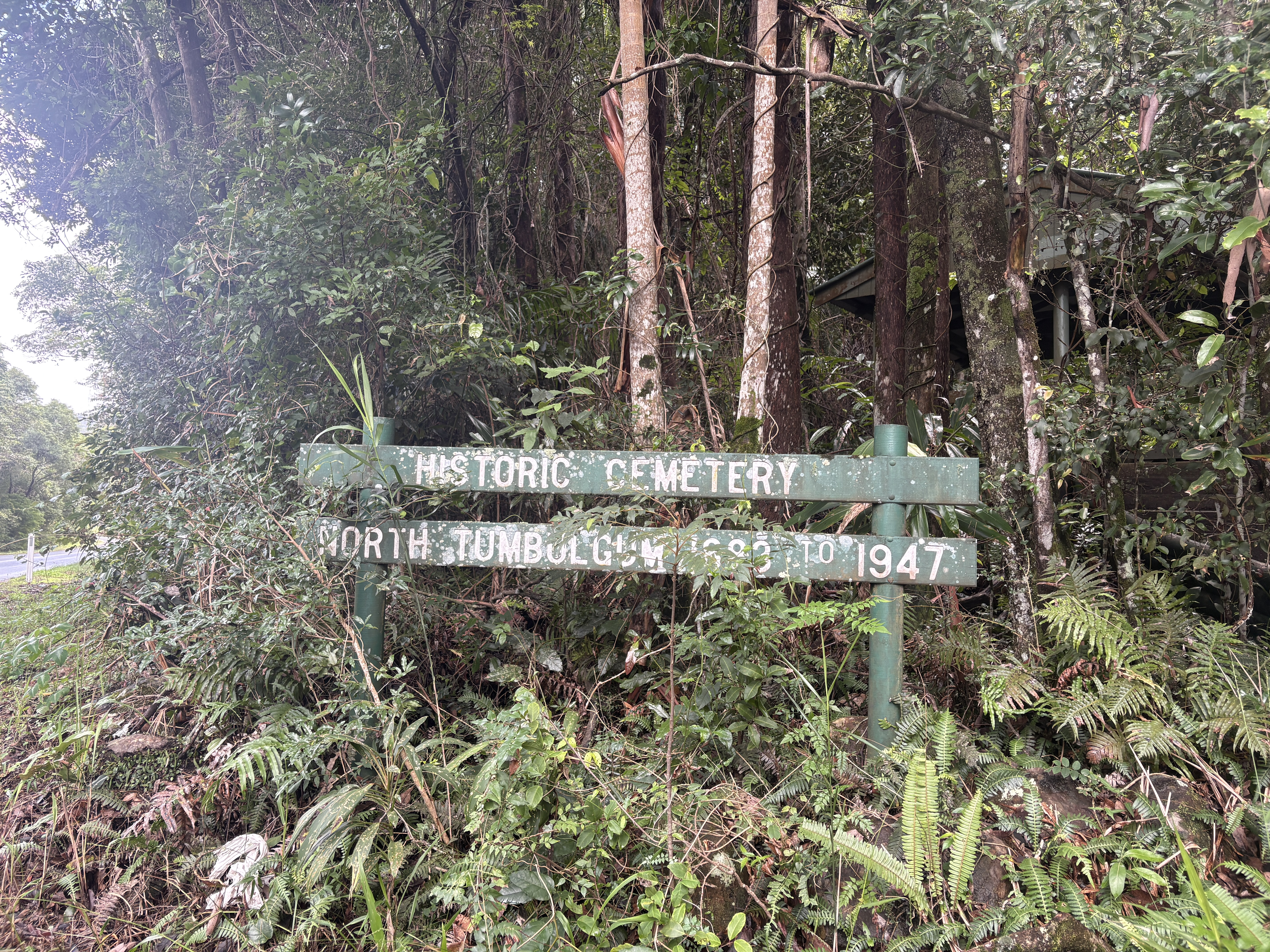
The entrance area to Tumbulgum Historic Cemetery, 2026

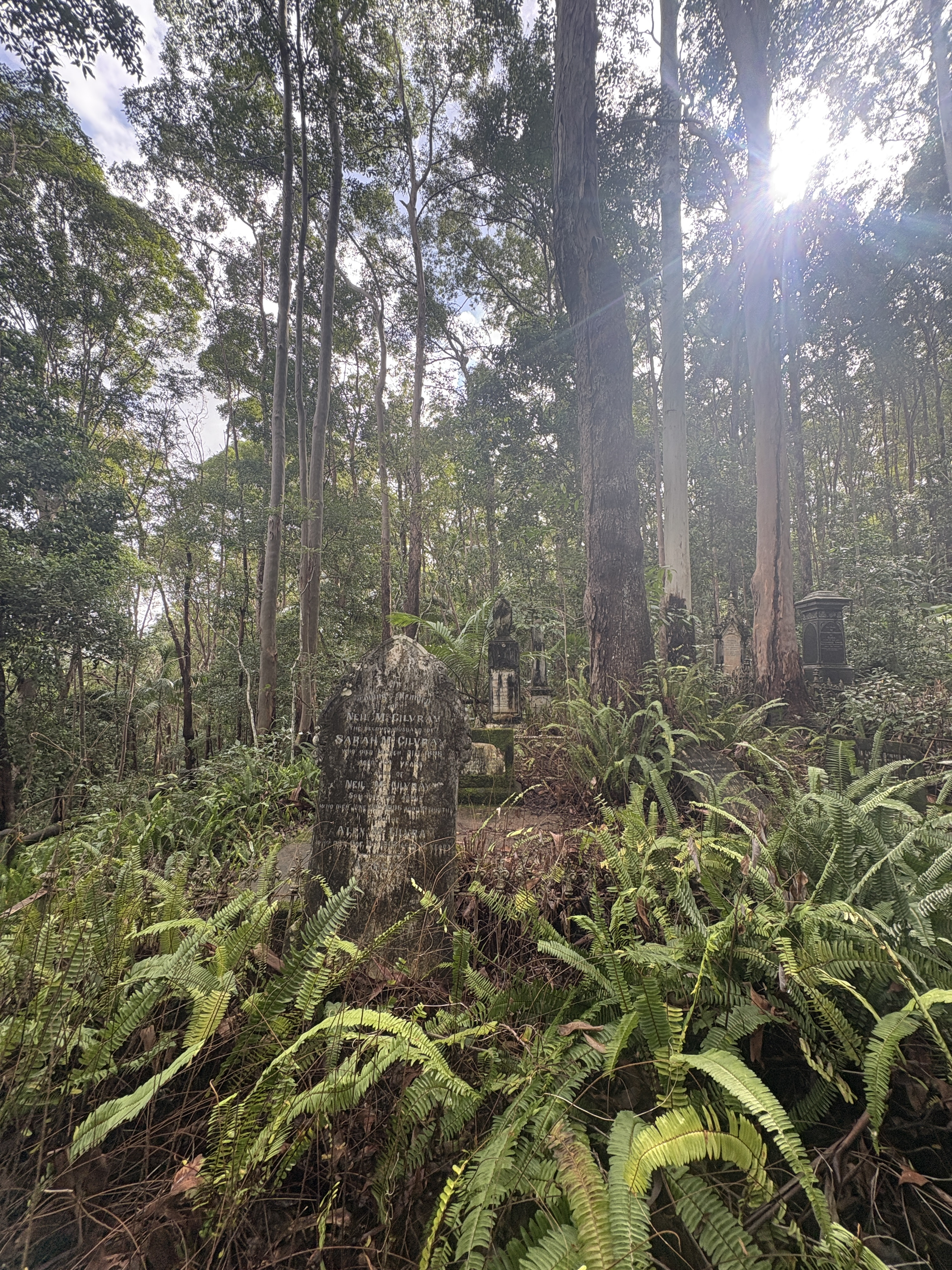
Graves at the Tumbulgum Historic Cemetery, 2026

North Tumbulgum is a locality in the Tweed Shire of New South Wales, Australia and it is adjacent to Tumbulgum. It had a population of 238 as of the 2021 census.

The Ngandowal and Minyungbal speaking people of the Bundjalung people are the traditional owners of the Tweed region, including North Tumbulgum, and the surrounding areas.

It is the location of the Tumbulgum Historic Cemetery, which is also known as the North Tumbulgum Cemetery, which operated between 1883 and 1947.

== Demographics ==
As of the 2021 Australian census, 238 people resided in North Tumbulgum, down from 256 in the 2016 census. The median age of persons in North Tumbulgum was 39 years. There were more males than females, with 56.7% of the population male and 43.3% female. The average household size was 2.9 people per household.
