= Finley =

Finley may refer to:

- Finley (name), a given name and surname
- Finley (band), Italian pop/punk band
- Finley, a brand of The Coca-Cola Company

== Places ==
=== Australia ===
- Finley, New South Wales

=== United States ===
- Finley, California
- Finley, Indiana, also known as Carrollton
- Finley, Kentucky
- Finley, Missouri, original name for Oregon, Missouri
- Finley, North Dakota
- Finley, Oklahoma
- Finley, Tennessee
- Finley, Washington
- Finley, Wisconsin, a town
  - Finley (community), Wisconsin, an unincorporated community
- Finley Golf Course, Chapel Hill, North Carolina
- Finley Hospital, Dubuque, Iowa
- Finley Point, Montana
- Finley Township, Scott County, Indiana
- East Finley Township, Pennsylvania
- West Finley Township, Pennsylvania

== See also ==
- Findlay (disambiguation)
- Finlay
