= James McKinley =

James McKinley may refer to:

- James McKinley (politician) (1877–1954), politician in Alberta, Canada and municipal councillor in Edmonton
- James McKinley (American football) (1945–2012), businessman and former American football coach and player
- James Fuller McKinley (1880–1941), U.S. Army officer and Adjutant General, 1933–1935
- James C. McKinley Jr. (born 1962), American journalist
- James Wilfred McKinley (1857–1918), Los Angeles City Attorney
- Jim McKinley (pole vaulter) (born 1910), American pole vaulter, runner-up at the 1932 NCAA Track and Field Championships
