= Allan Brown (RAAF officer) =

Australian flying ace

Allan Runciman Brown
- Born: 24 April 1895
- Died: 1964 (aged 68–69)
- Military career
- Allegiance: Australia
- Branch: Artillery; Royal Flying Corps; Royal Australian Air Force
- Rank: Wing Commander
- Units: No. 68 Squadron RFC/No. 1 Squadron AFC, No. 69 Squadron RAF
- Awards: Distinguished Flying Cross
- Other work: Wing Commander in RAAF during World War II

Wing Commander Allan Runciman Brown was an Australian World War I flying ace credited with five aerial victories. During World War II, he was a Wing Commander for the Royal Australian Air Force.

He was born on 24 April 1895, and in civilian life, Brown was a draper in Launceston, Australia.

Brown originally served as an artillery officer, before becoming a pilot. He was assigned to No. 68 Squadron RFC/1 Squadron AFC in Egypt. There he was teamed with Lieutenant Garfield Finlay as his observer/gunner on Bristol F2b Fighters; Brown's gunner for four of his five triumphs was Finlay. Brown's modus operandi was to force enemy planes into landing, and then destroy them on the ground with bombs and bullets. He scored his first win on 3 May 1918 near Suweilah, and his last one on 22 August 1918 at Ramleh. He also carried out successful ground attacks on cavalry and anti-aircraft guns.

== Honours and awards ==
Distinguished Flying Cross (DFC):

Lieut. (A./Capt.) Allan Runciman Brown (Australian F.C.). (EGYPT) On 22 August Capt. Brown, with Lieut. Finlay as his observer, attacked an enemy two-seater, forcing it to land in our lines. On four other occasions these officers have engaged and destroyed enemy aircraft, displaying marked gallantry and skill. In addition, they have rendered most valuable service in attacking enemy cavalry, anti-aircraft guns and other ground targets, inflicting heavy loss.
