= Richard Finlay =

Scottish footballer

Personal information
- Full name: Richard Vary Kirkman Finlay
- Date of birth: 12 May 1883
- Place of birth: Helensburgh, Scotland
- Date of death: 17 February 1948 (aged 64)
- Place of death: Surrey, England
- Position: Inside forward

Senior career*
Years	Team	Apps	(Gls)
1906–1910	Queen's Park	22	(3)
- * Club domestic league appearances and goals

Richard Vary Kirkman Finlay (12 May 1883 – 17 February 1948) was a Scottish amateur footballer who played as an inside forward in the Scottish League for Queen's Park.

== Personal life ==
Finlay served as a lieutenant in the Royal Naval Volunteer Reserve during the First World War.

== Career statistics ==
Appearances and goals by club, season and competition
Club	Season	League			Scottish Cup		Other		Total	
Club	Season	Division	Apps	Goals	Apps	Goals	Apps	Goals	Apps	Goals
Queen's Park	1906–07	Scottish First Division	14	2	0	0	1 (Note: Appearance in Glasgow Merchants Charity Cup)	0	15	2
Queen's Park	1907–08	Scottish First Division	8	1	0	0	1 (Note: Appearance in Glasgow Cup)	0	9	1
Career total			22	3	0	0	2	0	24	3
