= Onya Hogan-Finlay =

Canadian artist (born 1977)

Onya Hogan–Finlay (born 1977) is a Canadian interdisciplinary artist, and small business owner. Her collaborative art projects focus on queer history, research, education, and community outreach. She is also a sea salt farmer, and a co-owner of OK Sea Salt. She is based in LaHave in Nova Scotia.

== Early life and education ==
Hogan-Finlay was born in 1977, in Fredericton, New Brunswick, Canada. She is of Canadian settler ancestry. She is queer.

She received her Bachelor's in Fine Arts degree in 2000 from Concordia University in Montreal, and Master's in Fine Arts degree in 2011 from the University of Southern California.

== Selected works ==
Hogan-Finlay was a founding member of project MOBILELIVRE–BOOKMOBILE project (2001–2005), alongside Courney Dailey, Leila Portavef, and Ginger Brooks Takahashi. They remodeled an Airstream trailer and filled it with books, zines, and art pieces, and toured the United States and Canada. Hogan-Finlay describes it as a "grass-roots, scrappy project" made up of volunteers; it was a project with a goal to inspire interest in art and increase media literacy. With a collection of art and magazines, they toured the US and Canada. Hogan-Finlay is a co-editor of "The BOOKMOBILE Book", a book documenting the project released in 2014.

Hogan-Finlay's MFA thesis at University of Southern California included an exhibition, titled My Taste in Men (2011), featuring art from the ONE Archives. While the archive had a plethora of art from gay men, the lack of art from women and transgender people inspired her to create a showcase with erotic art from gay men as well as intentional empty space for excluded identities from the community. The center of her exhibit had a wallpaper featuring Reed Erickson, a transgender philanthropist who helped fund the ONE archives, with the wallpaper acting as a representation of his background contributions to the ONE Archives.

Hogan-Finlay continues to make art while living in Nova Scotia. "Apple Obscura" (2022) is a large inflatable apple hung from an 18-foot ladder. Inside the apple is a camera obscura, from which observers can peer through to see their surroundings upside down.

== Personal life ==
Hogan-Finlay is married to Kim Kelly, who holds a degree in business and horticulture. In 2021, the couple moved to the LaHave Islands in Nova Scotia and began their sea salt business, OK Sea Salt. Calling themselves the "salty dykes", the couple takes pride in running a queer woman-owned business. Part of their revenue is allocated to be donated to charities promoting equality and social justice.
