= Robert McKinley =

Robert McKinley may refer to:

- Robert McKinley (politician) (1928–2022), Canadian politician
- Robert McKinley (cricketer) (born 1993), cricketer from Northern Ireland
- Robert McKinley (tennis) (born 1950), American tennis player
