= Peter McKinley =

American politician

Member of the Michigan House of Representatives from the Manitou County district
- In office January 7, 1857 – December 31, 1860

Personal details
- Born: c. 1811 New York

Peter McKinley (born c. 1811) was a Michigan politician.

== Early life ==
McKinley was born around 1811 in New York.

== Career ==
McKinley was a farmer. On November 4, 1856, McKinley was elected to the Michigan House of Representatives where he represented the Manitou County district from January 7, 1857, to December 31, 1860. During his second term, he served on the Rules and Joint Rules committee and the House of Correction committee.

== Personal life ==
McKinley lived in St. James, Michigan on Beaver Island.
