= Kelly McKinley =

Director of Oakland Museum

Kelly McKinley is the Deputy Director of the Oakland Museum of California. Previously, she served in leadership roles at the Art Gallery of Ontario, Bruce Mau Design, and the Museum of Contemporary Art San Diego. Her focus is in museum education, having overseen family and youth programming in many of her professional positions.

== Early life and education ==
McKinley was born in Montreal, Quebec to a Canadian mother and Irish Anglian father. Relocating first to Dublin, McKinley spent much of her early life in northwest Ireland during the Troubles. In a 2019 interview, McKinley stated her first ever visit to a museum in Omagh, Northern Ireland was halted by the 1981 hunger strike, and she was only able to make the trip with classmates months later. After moving back to Canada, McKinley attended Queen's University in Kingston, Ontario where she received a bachelor's degree in Art History and French. McKinley then earned her master's degree in Museum Studies at the University of Toronto.

== Career ==
McKinley began her career in museums in 1987 while studying at Queen's University, working as a docent in the Agnes Etherington Art Centre. McKinley then moved to the National Gallery of Canada's Prints and Drawings Department, and secured an internship at the Tate in 1992 focusing in youth programming. The following year, McKinley was hired at the Art Gallery of Ontario, serving from 1993 to 1996 as Coordinator of Family Programs. From 1996 to 1999, McKinley served as the gallery's Manager of School and Family Programs, then as Curator of Education at the Museum of Contemporary Art San Diego from 1999 to 2002. During an 11-month stint, McKinley served as a project manager for Bruce Mau Design in Toronto and Panama City. Her work with Bruce Mau included branding, communications, and exhibition design. Among McKinley's clients with Bruce Mau were Frank Gehry, the Museum of Modern Art, Ian Schrager, and the Biomuseo in Panama.

McKinley resumed her work at AGO in 2002, serving as Head of Education and Public Programming, Director of Education and Public Programming, and Executive Director of Education and Public Programming. McKinley also co-authored Meet the Group of Seven (1999) with David Wistow, a children's book profiling the influential Group of Seven artists and their works displayed at AGO. In 2014, she was hired as the director of the Center for Experience Development and Collections at the Oakland Museum of California. McKinley was appointed as the museum's Deputy Director, her current position, in 2017. Beginning in 2015, McKinley has led the Oakland Museum's staff in researching the social impact of their institution. Additionally, McKinley has overseen exhibitions such as "Altered State: Marijuana in California" and "All Power to the People: Black Panthers at 50" at the Oakland Museum.

== Personal life ==
McKinley is married and a mother of two children. In her spare time, she enjoys knitting and playing squash. McKinley currently resides in the Bay Area.

== Publications and articles ==
- Wistow, David and McKinley, Kelly. Meet the Group of Seven. Toronto: Kids Can Press, 1999.
- McKinley, Kelly. "What is our museum's social impact?" Medium, A Medium Corporation, 10 July 2017, https://medium.com/new-faces-new-spaces/what-is-our-museums-social-impact-62525fe88d16.
- Fogarty, Lori, McKinley, Kelly, and Reed, Ayanna. "No Stone Left Unturned: How the Oakland Museum of California is practicing equity and inclusion." Museum Magazine, American Alliance of Museums, 2 September 2019, https://www.aam-us.org/2019/09/02/no-stone-left-unturned/.

== Professional affiliations ==
- Ontario Museums Association Board Member (1995-1997)
- Institute of Museum and Library Services Grant Peer Reviewer (2001, 2018)
- Museum Education Roundtable Board Member (2008-2010)
- University of Toronto Faculty Council, Faculty of Information and Museum Studies (2008-2011)
- Ontario College of Art and Design University Adjunct Faculty, School of Graduate Studies, Criticism and Curatorial Practice Program (2008-2013)
- University of Toronto Sessional Instructor, School of Graduate Studies, Museum Studies Program (2012)
- Curator: The Museum Journal Editorial Board Member (2016-present)
- American Alliance of Museums Secretary, EdCom Steering Committee (2014-2016); Board Member (2016-present)
