= Finlay & Co. =

British manufacturer of sunglasses

Finlay & Co. is a British sunglasses company founded in 2012 that started with being specialised in unisex wooden sunglasses. The company won a Shell LiveWIRE Grand Ideas Award in 2012 and featured in the British Fashion Awards. The Daily Telegraph's Victoria Bain said the company's Bosworth Ebony sunglasses would "turn way more heads in the park."

In more recent days, Finlay & Co. have left the wooden glasses and moved over to acetate frames. Megan Markle wore their model Percy on her first public appearance with Prince Harry. This led to the website crashing and the company sold for over £20,000 over one night.

In February 2014, Finlay & Co. were invited to exhibit at Milan Fashion Week as part of The Vogue Talents Corner
