= McKinley Blackburn =

American academic

McKinley L. Blackburn is a U.S.-American economist and currently the James A. Morris Professor of Economics at the University of South Carolina. His research interests include labour economics, econometrics, and economic demography.

== Biography ==
McKinley Blackburn earned a B.S. in economics from the University of South Carolina in 1982, followed by a M.A. and a Ph.D. in economics from Harvard University in 1985 and 1987. Since his graduation, Blackburn has always held a position at the University of South Carolina, first as assistant professor of economics (1987–93), then as associate professor (1993–98) and finally as full professor (1998–2010). In 2010, he was made the James A. Morris Professor of Economics at the Darla Moore School of Business. In 1989/90, Blackburn spent a year as visiting scholar at the Russell Sage Foundation. In terms of professional service, Blackburn has performed editorial duties for the Economics of Education Review since 2008. His research has been recognized with the Aldi J.M. Hagenaars Memorial Award (1994) and the Research Development Award of the Darla Moore School of Business.

== Research ==
McKinley Blackburn's current research focuses on the effects of minimum wages on employment, the econometric estimation of the effect of individual characteristics on wages, and the behaviour of banks in mortgage markets. According to IDEAS/RePEc, Blackburn belongs to the top 6% of economists registered in the database in terms of research output. Key findings of his research include the following:

- The increases in the returns to schooling observed in the U.S. during the 1980s cannot be attributed to a change in the relationship between ability and schooling wherein higher returns to schooling would have e.g. masked an increase in the average ability of graduates (with David Neumark).
- Together with David E. Bloom and Richard B. Freeman, Blackburn documents the strong deterioration of the economic position of less-skilled American males in the 1970s and 1980s, which the authors attribute to a combination of deindustrialization, deunionization, and changes in the growth rates of different education groups, but find no role for decreases in the minimum wage, technological change, increased female labour market participation, and changes in the quality of less-educated workers.
- Contrary the downward bias in the OLS estimates of the returns to schooling in the U.S. found in earlier research, Blackburn and Neumark find that OLS estimates which fail to control for ability overestimate returns to schooling by 40%.
- Differences in unobserved ability appear to explain only a small share of wage differentials between industries and occupations in the U.S. (with Neumark).
- Increases in minimum wages in the U.S. between 1983 and 1996 appear to have reduced poverty among teenagers and older dropouts from junior high schools (with John T. Addison).
- Unemployment insurance may have increased the wages of workers in the U.S. after the end of their unemployment spells, though less than indicated by earlier research.
