= Tom Finlay =

Irish hurler

Personal information
- Born: 1897 Ballygeehan, County Laois, Ireland
- Died: 6 September 1967 (aged 70) St Stephen's Green, Dublin, Ireland
- Occupation: Army officer

Sport
- Sport: Hurling
- Position: Wing-back
Club
- Years: Club
- Ballygeehan
Inter-county
- Years: County
- Laois; Dublin
Inter-county titles
- Leinster titles: 3
- All-Irelands: 2

Thomas P. Finlay (1897 – 6 September 1967) was an Irish hurler who played as a wing-back for the Laois senior team.

Regarded as one of Laois's greatest-ever players, Finlay played during the county's most successful period from 1914 to 1915 before later lining out for Dublin. During his inter-county career he won two All-Ireland medals and three Leinster medals. Finlay was an All-Ireland runner-up on one occasion.

At club level Finlay won several county club championship medals with Ballygeehan.

His brother, Jack Finlay, was also an All-Ireland medalist with Laois.
