= Richard McKinley =

American businessman (1890–1951)

Richard Albert McKinley (February 14, 1886 – May 18, 1951) was the first Director of the Indiana Department of Financial Institutions (DFI) and one of the founders of Security Bank and Trust in Vincennes, Indiana. He was appointed the first Director of the Indiana (DFI) in January 1933 and served until November 1937.

Mr. McKinley was born and reared in Clark county, Indiana.

Prior to serving as DFI Director Mr. McKinley was the State Bank Commissioner until the new Department of Financial Institutions was created in 1933.

Mr. McKinley started his banking career at age 22 at the Borden State Bank in Borden, Indiana. In 1912 he organized the bank at Hardensburg, Indiana and served as Head Cashier for 6 years.

Subsequently he sponsored the organization and establishment of the Clark County State Bank in Jeffersonville, Indiana in 1915. He was made Cashier and later became president. He held that position until 1933 when Governor Paul V. McNutt appointed him Commissioner of the Department of Financial Institutions of the State of Indiana. In July of the same year, he was appointed director of Department of Financial Institutions of the State of Indiana under the new banking code of 1933. He was reappointed director of the department by Governor M. Clifford Townsend and served in that capacity until November 1937.

After serving as DFI Director Richard moved to Vincennes, Indiana and helped to found Security Bank and Trust which opened on January 3, 1938 and served as the institution's first President until January 1949 at which time he was elected chairman of the board of directors.

Known as Mr. Mac within the Vincennes community McKinley would open a savings account and deposit a dollar for each child born in the city.

Richard was married to Edna E. Elrod on May 18, 1907 in Clark County in the State of Indiana. The McKinley's had four children, Irma Elrod McKinley (1908–1971), Roy Christian McKinley (1911–1914), Richard Albert McKinley (1916–1917) and Marjorie Marie McKinley (1918–1988).
