= James C. McKinley Jr. =

American journalist (born 1962)

James C. McKinley
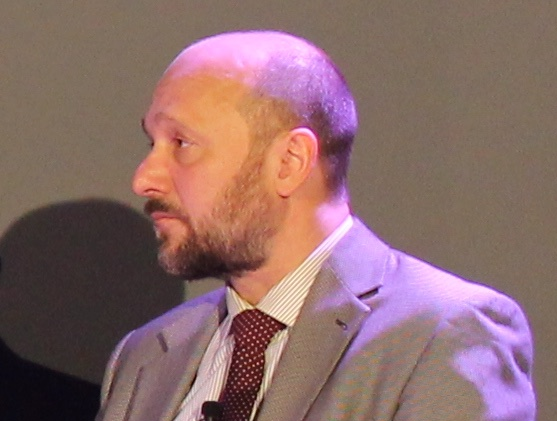
- McKinley in 2015
- Born: James Courtright McKinley Jr. 1962 (age 63–64); Kansas City, Missouri, U.S.
- Occupation: Journalist
- Years active: 1986–present

James Courtright McKinley Jr. (born 1962) is an American journalist for The New York Times. He is currently an assistant editor on the Metro desk at The New York Times specializing in criminal justice and law enforcement overseeing criminal justice reporters.

== Early life and education ==
McKinley grew up in Kansas City, Missouri. He is the son of James C. McKinley, former University of Missouri, Kansas City (UMKC) English professor, editor of New Letters, and writer and Mary Ann Underwood, a former continuing education program manager also at UMKC. McKinley has three siblings: His younger brother Jesse McKinley is currently Albany bureau chief at The New York Times; his brother Gabe McKinley also worked at The New York Times for over 12 years and is now a playwright; and sister Molly McKinley also worked at The Times before moving into a career in film and television as an editor and writer based out of Santa Fe, New Mexico.

In 1984, McKinley earned a B.A. in English literature from Cornell University. In 1986, he received an M.A. from University of Missouri School of Journalism.

== Career ==
McKinley began his career in journalism while still in college, working for local radio stations in Ithaca and stringing for The Syracuse Post Standard from 1982 to 1985.

McKinley was the editor of the local New York City paper, West Side Spirit. He was an editor and staff writer at The Greenwich Time, the Greenwich, Connecticut daily.

In late 1986, McKinley started at The New York Times as a copyboy eventually working his way up to being a reporter. He covered the police department as a Metro cop reporter and was a City Hall reporter, and covered the Federal courts in Manhattan.

From 1996 to 1999, McKinley was Nairobi bureau chief for The New York Times, where he covered the return of Rwandan refugees after the genocide, the fall of Mobutu, the rise of Laurent Kabila in the former Zaire, and the bombing of U.S. embassies. He was a Miami correspondent for a short time.

He returned to New York in 1999, working as an investigative journalist in the Sports Department. From 2000 to 2004, McKinley was Albany bureau chief for The Times, where he covered New York Governor George Pataki's administration, the state budget and state legislative items.

From 2004 to 2008, McKinley was Mexico City correspondent, where he covered the election of President Felipe Calderón and his government’s war against drug cartels.

From 2009 to 2011, McKinley was Houston bureau chief. He covered events such as the Fort Hood shootings, Hurricane Ike and the British Petroleum oil spill in the Gulf.

In 2011, McKinley returned to New York City and became the Times pop music reporter and general arts coverage.

He currently works as an editor on the Metro desk specializing in criminal justice and law enforcement.

=== Controversy ===
On March 8, 2011, The New York Times published an article by McKinley on the rape of an eleven-year-old girl in the East Texas town of Cleveland. The story prompted outrage, not only because of the crime involved - a gang rape perpetrated by 18 boys and men - but also because of criticism over how McKinley framed the piece: relying heavily on quotes from individuals who blamed the victim, scant attention to reporting details on the boys and men involved, and an overemphasis on the impoverished environment where the assault occurred.

On March 11, 2011, The New York Times public editor Arthur R. Brisbane agreed that the piece lacked critical balance by relying heavily on quotes from individuals who expressed concern for the perpetrators, as well as detailing the victim's appearance. McKinley and The New York Times, Brisbane determined, created an impression that the victim "had it coming". Brisbane never interviewed McKinley, nor his editors, before writing his column.

On March 29, 2011, the Times published a second article by McKinley and Erica Goode that delved more deeply into the criminal backgrounds of many of the alleged rapists as well as the family of the victim which left no doubt the girl was the victim of a horrendous crime.

== Personal life ==
McKinley is married and has two children.

== Selected works and publications ==
- McKinley, Jr., James C. (3 April 1989). "5,000 Protest a Bronx Housing Plan". The New York Times.
- McKinley, Jr., James C. (4 April 1989). "Science Teacher Is Held in Bronx Heroin Sale". The New York Times.
- McKinley, Jr., James C. (10 April 1989). "Sad Pasts Live Again on Train to March". The New York Times.
- McKinley, Jr., James C. (18 September 1989). "Starr Street, Living with Drugs - A Special Report; Friendships and Fear Undermine A Will to Fight Drugs in Brooklyn". The New York Times.
- McKinley, Jr., James C. (18 August 1996). "Son of a Somali Warlord". The New York Times.
- McKinley, Jr., James C. (27 April 1997). "For Refugees, Last Stop in Zaire". The New York Times.
- McKinley, Jr., James C. (4 October 2008). "Three Weeks After Storm, a Grim Task of Recovery". The New York Times.
- McKinley, Jr., James C.; Evans, Thayer (20 September 2008). "Power Is Scarce, but Houston's Spirit Isn't Lacking". The New York Times.
- McKinley, James C.; Goode, Erica (28 March 2011). "3-Month Nightmare Emerges in Rape Inquiry". The New York Times.
- McKinley, Jr., James C. (29 December 2015). "New York's Chief Judge Leaving a Legacy of Reforms Inspired by Social Justice". The New York Times.
- McKinley, Jesse; McKinley, Jr., James C. (10 January 2016). "Cuomo Proposes Higher-Education Initiative in New York Prisons". The New York Times.
- Baker, Al; McKinley, Jr., James C. (25 May 2018). "The Case Against Harvey Weinstein, Explained". The New York Times.
- Ferré-Sadurní, Luis; McKinley, Jr., James C.; Marcolini, Barbara; Tiefenthäler, Ainara; Browne, Malachy; Jordan, Drew (10 September 2018). "How a Gang Hunted and Killed a 15-Year-Old in the Bronx". The New York Times.
- McKinley, Jr., James C.; Winston, Ali (18 April 2019). "Police Officer Wounded in Wild Shootout in Upper Manhattan". The New York Times.
