= Iain Finlay =

Australian author and journalist (1935–2025)

- Iain Finlay, an international journalist and author pictured at the ABC.
- Born: 21 October 1935; Canberra, Australian Capital Territory, Australia
- Died: 6 May 2025 (aged 89); Tumbulgum, New South Wales, Australia
- Occupations: Author; journalist; radio presenter; television host

Iain Finlay (21 October 1935 – 6 May 2025) was an Australian author, journalist, radio and television host, and humanitarian. He was known for his work with the ABC, including a lengthy stint as a foreign correspondent for ABC News.

He worked internationally including in Hong Kong in radio production and presenting and also in Canada at CBC and England at the BBC.

== Early life and career ==
Finlay was born in Canberra, Australian Capital Territory in 1935, his father served in the military and was an aide-de-camp to Governor-General Issac Issacs

He was educated at schools both locally and internationally and eventually at 18 years old, hitchhiked from Europe to South Africa with his friend, Noel White. Finlay and White then worked in the South African mines and then on the beaches as Lifeguards where they became mates with writer, Bryce Courtney.

Finlay worked in many jobs, in factories for Hanimex, worked at Qantas in Sydney Airport and eventually as a journalist, which one of Finlay's earliest jobs was reporting for the United Press during the Melbourne Olympic Games in 1956.

He co-founded and hosted the science and technology television series Beyond 2000. He was a presenter on the ABC current affairs radio program PM, on ABC radio morning shows (together with Patricia Sheppard), and also hosted This Day Tonight. He has written both fiction and non-fiction books.

Finlay reported all over the world and visited more than 100 countries. He was named the 2017 Australia Day ambassador.

== Personal life and death ==
Finlay married Janice Phegan in 1958 and had one son, Guy, born in 1958.

In 1962, Finlay moved to Hong Kong and became the SE Asian correspondent for United Press. Finlay left Hong Kong in 1965 leaving his family behind and continued a relationship with Patricia Sheppard, whom he had met in Hong Kong. They lived in New York until Patricia moved back to her husband in England but eventually returned to New York to give birth to her daughter with Dick Sheppard.

Finlay and Patricia Sheppard returned to Australia in the early 70s and lived for a period on the North side of Sydney at Avalon and Palm Beach in New South Wales.

Finlay and Patricia Sheppard had one son together, Sheppard had a daughter with her English husband, Dick Sheppard whilst living with Finlay. Finlay and Clark lived in Tweed Heads. Together, they worked on humanitarian and education initiatives in Asia, including building a primary school in Laos.

Finlay, who had amyloidosis in his later years, died through voluntary assisted dying at his home in Tumbulgum, New South Wales, on 6 May 2025. He was 89. Finlay was buried on his property wrapped in paperbark.

== Bibliography ==
- The Azanian Assignment, New York: Harper & Row, 1978 - novel
- Africa Overland: A Trek from Cape Town to Cairo, London: Angus & Robertson, 1977 - with Patricia Sheppard
- South America Overland: From New York to Tierra Del Fuego, London: Angus & Robertson, 1980 - with Patricia Sheppard
- Across the South Pacific: Island-hopping from Santiago to Sydney, Angus & Robertson, 1981 - with Patricia Sheppard
- Good Morning Hanoi : A Year of Radio in Vietnam, Pymble, NSW: Simon & Schuster, 2006 - with Patricia Clark
- Savage Jungle : An Epic Struggle for Survival, Sydney: Simon & Schuster, 1991 ISBN 0-7318-0279-9

Finlay also provided the illustrations for Patricia Sheppard's book, Australian Adventurers (Angus & Robertson, 1984).
