= David Finlay (wrestler) =

German-born American professional wrestler (born 1993)

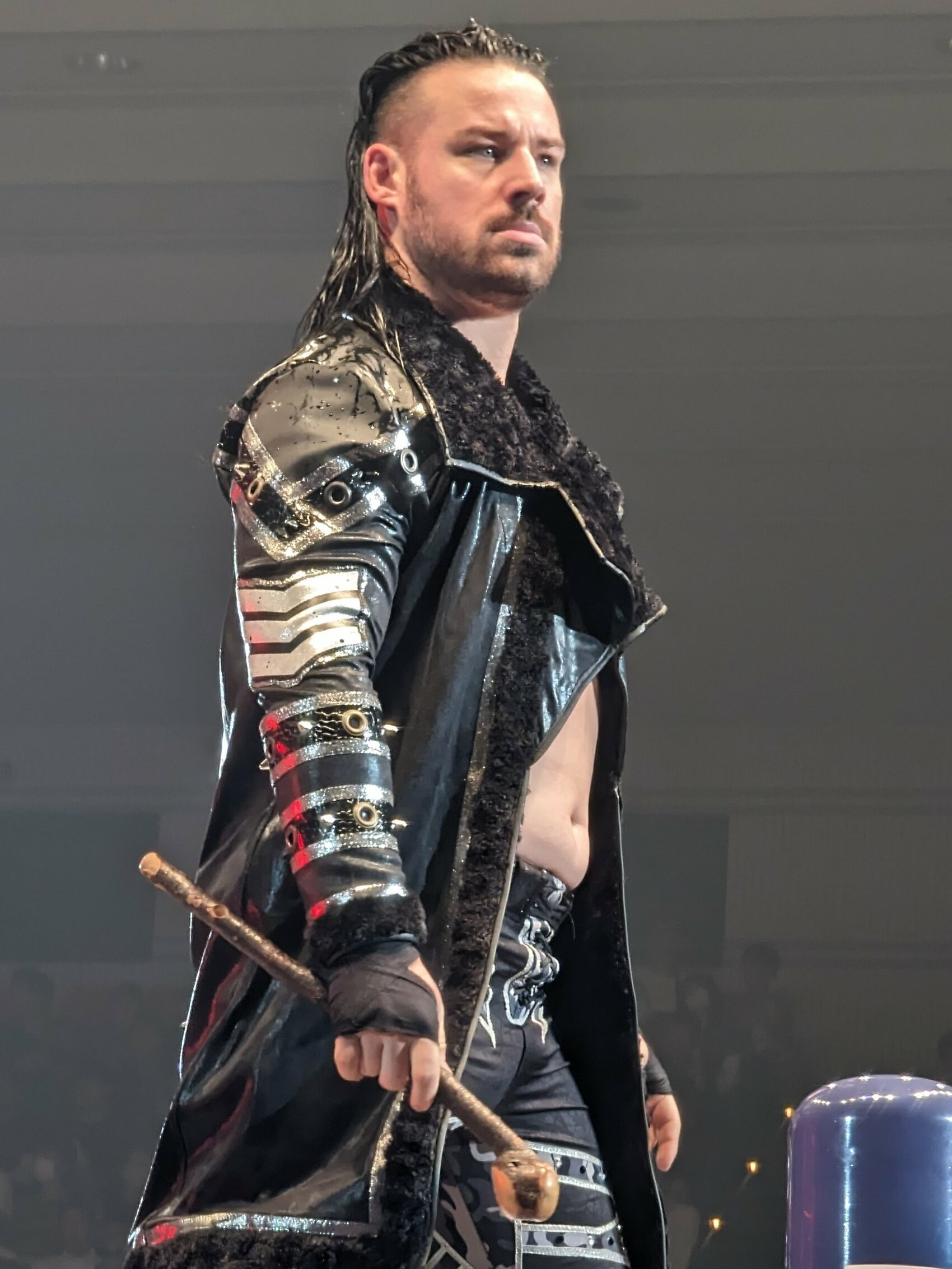
- Finlay in 2023

Personal information
- Born: David Stephen Finlay; 16 May 1993 (age 33) Hanover, Lower Saxony, Germany
- Spouse: Ana Scott (m. 2018)
- Children: 1
- Relatives: Fit Finlay (father); Brogan Finlay (brother); Dave Finlay Sr. (grandfather)

Professional wrestling career
- Ring name(s): David Finlay; David Finlay Jr.
- Billed height: 182 cm (5 ft 11 1/2 in)
- Billed weight: 105 kg (231 lb)
- Billed from: Atlanta, Georgia
- Trained by: Fit Finlay; Hiroshi Tanahashi; NJPW Dojo; Satoshi Kojima
- Debut: 22 December 2012

David Stephen Finlay (Note: When wrestling for New Japan Pro-Wrestling, his ring name is written in katakana as デビッド・フィンレー (Debiddo Finrē).) (born 16 May 1993) is a German-born American professional wrestler. As of March 2026, he is signed to All Elite Wrestling (AEW), where he is one-half of The Dogs alongside Clark Connors as members of The Cut stable. He is also a former AEW World Trios Champion.

Born in Germany to Northern Irish parents, he is a fourth-generation professional wrestler; his father, Fit Finlay, trained him before he received additional training from Hiroshi Tanahashi, Satoshi Kojima, and the New Japan Pro-Wrestling (NJPW) Dojo. He frequently partnered with Juice Robinson as the team FinJuice;, with whom he became a one-time IWGP Tag Team Champion with. Along with Ricochet and Satoshi Kojima, he is also a former NEVER Openweight 6-Man Tag Team Champion.

Upon joining and leading Bullet Club from 2023–2026, NJPW recognised Finlay as the fifth and final leader of Bullet Club, where he predominantly acted as the leader of the War Dogs sub-group. During his tenure in the stable, Finlay held the NEVER Openweight Championship once, was the inaugural and a two-time IWGP Global Heavyweight Champion, and the 2025 New Japan Cup winner. He left NJPW in 2026 and signed with AEW that same year.

== Early life ==
David Stephen Finlay was born on 16 May 1993 in Hanover, Germany to Northern Irish parents, professional wrestler David John Finlay, and Melanie Duffin. He has stated that he wanted to be a wrestler since he was young, being inspired by watching his father wrestle.

== Professional wrestling career ==
=== Early career (2012–2015) ===
On 22 December 2012, Finlay made his professional wrestling debut for German promotion European Wrestling Promotion (EWP). He defeated Big Daddy Walter by disqualification. Later that evening, he teamed up with his father for a tag team match against Robbie Brookside and Dan Collins, which they won; it was also his father's retirement match. In 2014, Finlay became the inaugural Power of Wrestling Junior Champion. He held the title for 314 days before vacating it on 20 August 2015, due to his signing with New Japan Pro-Wrestling (NJPW).

=== New Japan Pro-Wrestling (2015–2026) ===
==== Young Lion (2015–2016) ====
Finlay entered the 2015 Best of the Super Juniors tournament hosted by New Japan Pro-Wrestling (NJPW), but failed to win, losing all his matches in the tournament and ending with a final tally of 0 points. After the tournament, Finlay was announced as a "young lion". He would carry this moniker until September 2016, when Finlay announced he was no longer a young lion.

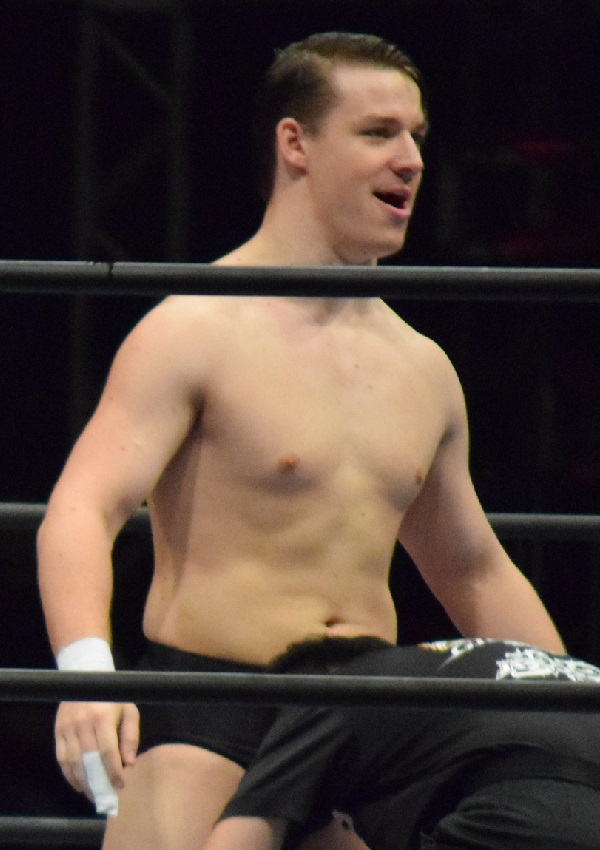
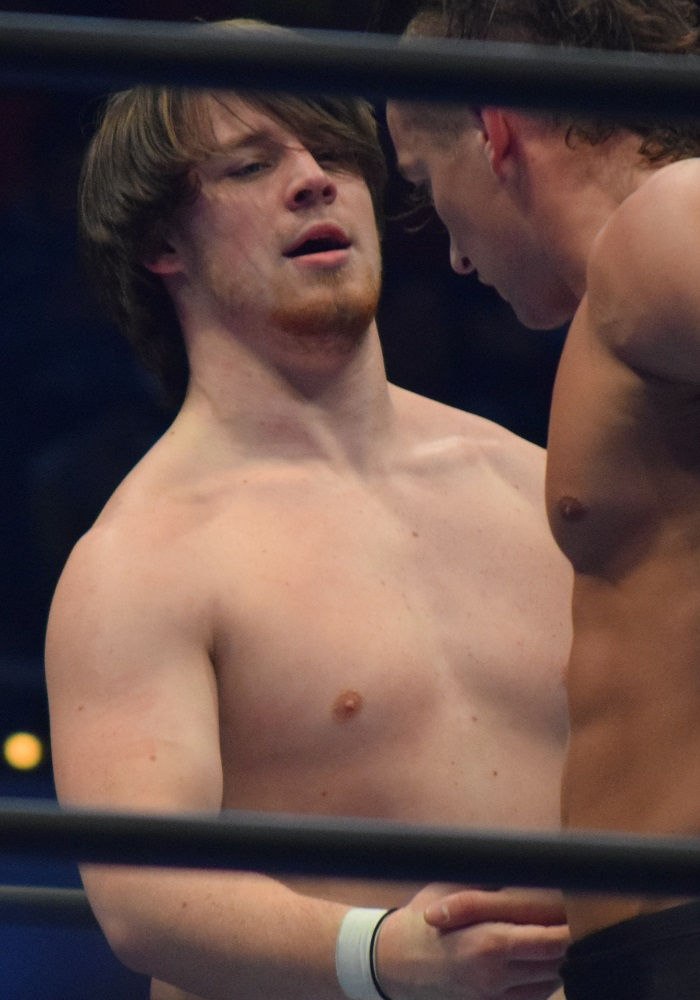
Finlay during his time as a young lion: in August 2015 (top) and in February 2016 (bottom)

==== FinJuice (2016–2022) ====
On 25 September, at Destruction in Kobe, he won the NEVER Openweight 6-Man Tag Team Championship with Ricochet and Satoshi Kojima by defeating Bullet Club (Nick Jackson, Matt Jackson and Adam Cole). They lost the titles at Wrestle Kingdom 11 on 4 January 2017 to Los Ingobernables de Japón (Evil, Bushi and Sanada). At Wrestling Dontaku in May, Finlay was defeated by Cody. In August, he formed a tag team with Juice Robinson, dubbed FinJuice. They teamed for the rest of the year before going their separate ways for the NJPW World Tag League in December, which saw Robinson teaming with Sami Callihan, while Finlay teamed with Katsuya Kitamura. Finlay and Kitamura failed to win the tournament, ending with 0 points.

At Strong Style Evolved in March 2018, Finlay attacked Jay White, after White's successful defense of the IWGP United States Heavyweight Championship over Hangman Page. Finlay was granted a title shot, but at the main event of Road to Wrestling Dontaku, he was defeated by White. Finlay returned to teaming with Robinson and other Taguchi Japan members for the remainder of the year; he and Robinson participated in the 2018 World Tag League, where they finished with a record of eight wins and five losses, failing to advance to the finals. Their final block match against Best Friends (Beretta and Chuckie T.) ended by disqualification, when Chuckie, who had recently been prone to violent outbursts, struck Finlay in the back with a chair. At New Years's Dash!! 2019, another match between FinJuice and Best Friends ended in a disqualification, when Chuckie once again struck Finlay in the back with a chair. On day one of The New Beginning in USA, Finlay defeated Chuckie in a no disqualification match, ending their feud.

Finlay was announced for the New Japan Cup, however on 23 February 2019, he suffered a shoulder injury removing him from the tournament. The injury happened during FinJuice's ROH World Tag Team Championship match against then-champions The Briscoes (Jay Briscoe and Mark Briscoe) at the Honor Rising NJPW/ROH event. It was later revealed to be a torn labrum and that he would be out of action for around six months. On 14 October at King of Pro-Wrestling, Finlay made his return to the company, by making the save on Robinson who was being attacked by Lance Archer, after their match for the vacant IWGP United States Heavyweight Championship. He then challenged Archer to a title shot a later date. This happened at Showdown in San Jose, but he was defeated by Archer. At Showdown in Los Angeles, Finlay, Robinson and Clark Connors were defeated by Suzuki-gun (Minoru Suzuki, Archer and El Desperado). Finlay would go on to enter the 2019 World Tag League with Robinson where they made it to the finals defeating Los Ingobernables de Japón (Evil and Sanada) and earning a shot at the IWGP Tag Team Championship against Guerrillas of Destiny (G.O.D; Tama Tonga and Tanga Loa). On 4 January 2020, at night one of Wrestle Kingdom 14, they defeated G.O.D to win the championship. They lost the titles back to G.O.D at The New Beginning USA on February 1.

In March 2020, New Japan suspended all of its activities, due to the COVID-19 pandemic, causing many non-Japanese talent to not be able to travel to Japan to compete, including Finlay. Therefore, a new American-based NJPW show was produced, called NJPW Strong. After a 6-month absence from in-ring competition, Finlay made his Strong debut in August, participating in the inaugural New Japan Cup USA tournament. He defeated Chase Owens in the quarter-finals and Tonga in the semi-finals. In the finals, Finlay lost to Kenta.

In November, Finlay and Robinson both returned to Japan to compete in the 2020 World Tag League tournament. FinJuice topped the table with 12 points but lost to the Guerillas of Destiny in the finals. In March 2021, Finlay entered the New Japan Cup. He defeated Owens and Yoshi-Hashi to advance to the quarter-finals. In the quarter-finals, Finlay achieved a massive win by defeating White, the NEVER Openweight Champion at the time. In the semi-final round, Finlay lost to eventual cup winner, Will Ospreay. Due to his quarter-final victory, Finlay received a shot at the Never Openweight Championship at Resurgence. In August at the event, White retained the title against Finlay. In April 2022, at Windy City Riot, FinJuice and Brody King defeated TMDK (Jonah and Shane Haste) and Bad Dude Tito in a 6-man tag-team street fight match.

After Robinson turned heel by joining Bullet Club and breaking up FinJuice, Finlay focused on solely singles competition. In June, Finlay was announced to be making his G1 debut in the G1 Climax 32 tournament, competing in the D Block. Finlay ended his first G1 with 6 points, although he earned points off of wins against Robinson, Ospreay and Shingo Takagi.

==== Bullet Club War Dogs and Unbound Co. (2023–2026) ====
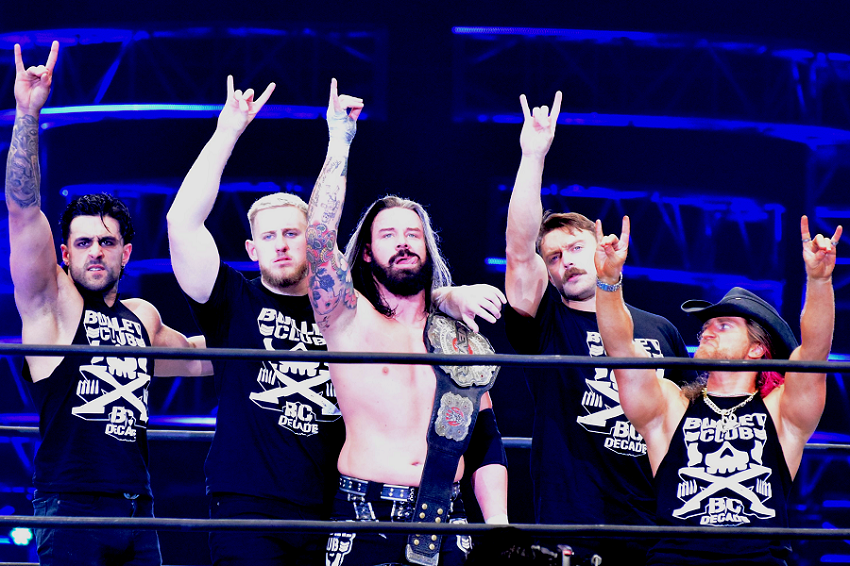
Finlay (center) with other members of the War Dogs sub-group in June 2023

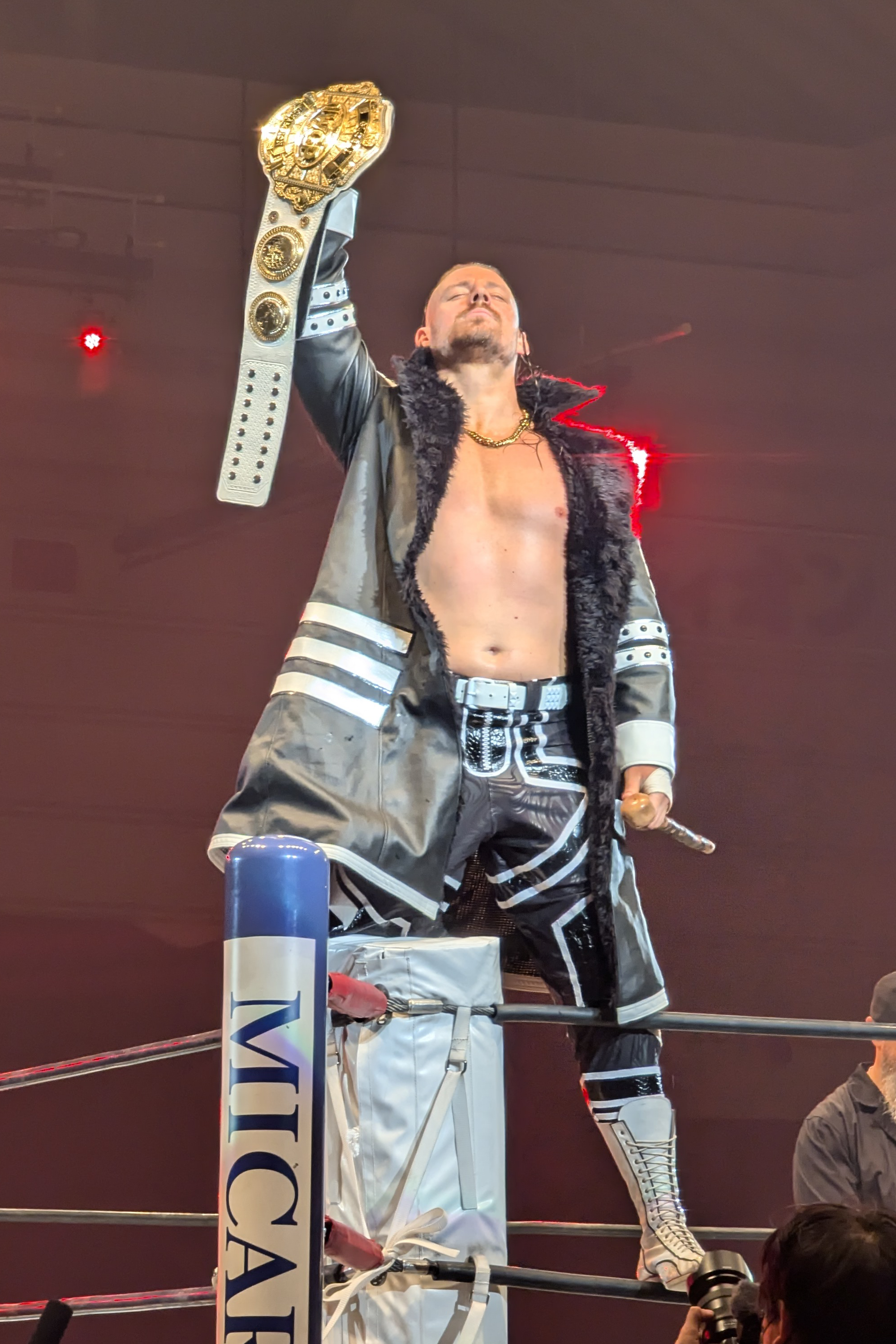
Finlay as the IWGP Global Heavyweight Champion in November 2024

On February 18, 2023, at Battle in the Valley, Finlay entered the ring to attack his former partner and longtime rival Jay White, after he was forced to leave NJPW, showing a more cocky and villainous persona. On March 5, after defeating Tomohiro Ishii in the first round of the 2023 New Japan Cup, Finlay was introduced by White's former manager Gedo as the newest member of Bullet Club, becoming the stable's fifth leader, following the departure of White. Finlay ended up making it all the way to the finals of the tournament, before losing to Sanada on March 21. During this time, El Phantasmo left Bullet Club while Finlay included Clark Connors, Drilla Moloney, Gabe Kidd and Alex Coughlin as Bullet Club's War Dogs. Finlay also defeated Tama Tonga Tonga to win the NEVER Openweight Championship.

The following month, Finlay entered the annual G1 Climax tournament, where he would compete in the C Block. Finlay finished his tournament campaign at the top of his block, scoring 10 points, thus advancing him to the quarter-finals. In the quarter-finals, Finlay was defeated by Will Ospreay, eliminating him from the tournament. On October 9 at Destruction in Ryōgoku, Finlay lost the NEVER Openweight Championship back to Tonga. On November 4 at Power Struggle, Finlay attacked and Jon Moxley and Ospreay, after he had defended the IWGP United States Heavyweight Championship, before proceeding to destroy both UK and the US Championship belts. Finlay faced them at Wrestle Kingdom 18 for a new title, the IWGP Global Heavyweight Championship, winning the match and becoming the inaugural IWGP Global Heavyweight Champion. He lost the title in his first title defense to Nic Nemeth on February 23 at The New Beginning in Sapporo, but regained at Wrestling Dontaku. From July 20 and August 12, Finlay took part in the 2024 G1 Climax, where he won his block with a record of six wins and three losses, advancing to the semi-finals of the tournament. On August 17, Finlay was defeated by Yota Tsuji in the semi-finals.

On January 4, 2025 at Wrestle Kingdom 19, Finlay lost his title to Tsuji, ending his second reign at 245 days. Finlay won the 2025 New Japan Cup, defeating Shota Umino in the finals and earning a shot against Hirooki Goto for the IWGP World Heavyweight Championship at Sakura Genesis, but was defeated. Shortly after, Finlay and Evil resume their feud over the leadership of Bullet Club, War Dogs and House of Torture rivalry culminated in a Dog Pound match, on May 3 at Wrestling Dontaku: Night 1, where the losers must leave Bullet Club. At the event, they defeated House of Torture in the Dog Pound match, forcing them out of the Bullet Club. At Dominion 6.15 in Osaka-jo Hall, Finlay was defeated by Evil in a Dog collar match. From July to August, Finlay competed in the G1 Climax, where he was placed in A Block. Finlay finished second in his block with 10 points, where he was eliminated by Konosuke Takeshita in the quarter-finals. On October 13 at King of Pro-Wrestling, the War Dogs formed an alliance with Mushozoku (Daiki Nagai, Hiromu Takahashi, Shingo Takagi, Titán, and Yota Tsuji), turning face. From November 20 to December 14, Finlay and Hiromu Takahashi took part to the World Tag League tournament, finishing with a record of three wins and four losses and failing to qualify for the semi-finals. In this period, Finlay started a feud with the new United Empire leader Callum Newman.

At Wrestle Kingdom 20 Finlay, alongside Kidd, Moloney and Unaffiliated members Takahashi and Takagi, was defeated by the United Empire. The following night, at New Year Dash!!, Finlay and Tsuji announced the dissolution of Bullet Club and Mushozoku, replacing the alliance with Unbound Company, which was a complete merger. On February 11, 2026, at The New Beginning in Osaka, Finlay was defeated by Newman, ending their feud. On February 17, it was reported that Finlay's contract with NJPW had expired. On February 27 at The New Beginning USA, Finlay defeated Fred Rosser in his final NJPW date. After signing with partner promotion All Elite Wrestling, it was reported by Sean Ross Sapp of Fightful that Finlay was "effectively done" with NJPW, ending his 11-year tenure with the promotion.

=== Ring of Honor (2016–2019) ===
Prior to Finlay's official debut for Ring of Honor in January 2019, his previous involvement with the American promotion was at the NJPW-ROH promoted Honor Rising: Japan shows, held in Korakuen Hall. His first appearance in this capacity was on 20 February 2016, where he was defeated by Jay White. In February 2017, Finlay tagged with Juice Robinson and Kushida, defeating Jado & Gedo and Silas Young, but the following night, he and Kushida lost to Young and Jado. In February 2018, Finlay was again involved in tag matches, tagging with Robinson in a defeat to The Young Bucks, and the following night, he, Robinson and Jay Lethal defeated Bullet Club (Chase Owens, Hikuleo and Yujiro Takahashi).

Finlay made his debut for Ring of Honor during the January 2019 TV tapings, in a loss to Tracy Williams. Robinson later announced the formation of Lifeblood, with the goal of bringing honor back to ROH; the stable included Finlay, Williams, Bandido, Mark Haskins and Tenille Dashwood. Lifeblood defeated Lethal's handpicked team of Jonathan Gresham, Flip Gordon, Dalton Castle and Jeff Cobb in the main event. Finlay and Robinson, representing Lifeblood, participated in the Tag Wars Tournament. In the first round, they beat Alex Coughlin and Karl Fredericks, and in the semi-finals, they won in a three-way dance over Lethal and Gresham and Coast 2 Coast (LSG and Shaheem Ali). In the final, they were defeated by Villain Enterprises (Brody King and PCO).

=== Consejo Mundial de Lucha Libre (2018) ===
On October 5, 2018, Finlay participated in Consejo Mundial de Lucha Libre's CMLL International Gran Prix, as part of the Resto del Mundo team, and as a representative of New Japan Pro-Wrestling. He lasted 29 minutes and 40 seconds, before being eliminated by Carístico. During October, he appeared in multiple tag team matches, all with the stipulation of two out of three falls.

=== Impact Wrestling (2021) ===
On February 13, 2021, at No Surrender, a video package aired promoting Finlay along with his tag team partner Juice Robinson (collectively known as FinJuice) arriving to Impact Wrestling as part of a partnership between Impact and New Japan Pro-Wrestling. They feuded with The Good Brothers (Doc Gallows and Karl Anderson), defeating them at Sacrifice to win the Impact World Tag Team Championship. They successfully defended their titles against Gallows and Anderson in a rematch at Rebellion. On the May 20 episode of Impact!, FinJuice lost the tag team titles to Violent By Design (Rhino and Joe Doering), ending their reign at 65 days. They would return to the company at Slammiversary, defeating Madman Fulton and Shera.

=== All Elite Wrestling (2022; 2026–present) ===
==== One night appearance (2022) ====
On the June 8, 2022 episode of Dynamite, Finlay made his debut for All Elite Wrestling (AEW), in a losing effort to Adam Page.

==== The Dogs (2026–present) ====
On the March 4, 2026 episode of Dynamite, Finlay returned to AEW as a heel, attacking Orange Cassidy and Darby Allin, and joining his former Bullet Club stablemates Clark Connors and Gabe Kidd as "The Dogs" (a reference to their former NJPW stable, Bullet Club War Dogs). It was later announced that all three were now signed to AEW. At Revolution on March 15, The Dogs were defeated by Allin, Cassidy, and Roderick Strong in a tornado trios match. On the April 8 tapings of Collision, The Dogs defeated Místico and JetSpeed (Kevin Knight and "Speedball" Mike Bailey) to win the AEW World Trios Championship, marking Finlay's first championship in AEW. AEW officially began recognizing this reign when the episode aired on tape delay on April 11. They then lost the Trios Title to The Conglomeration (Orange Cassidy, Roderick Strong, and Kyle O'Reilly) at Dynasty on April 12, ending their reign at 4 days, although AEW officially recognizes that their reign only lasted one day. At Forbidden Door on June 28, Finlay and Connors failed to capture the AEW World Tag Team Championship from Cage and Cope (Christian Cage and Adam Copeland) after Finlay was attacked during the match by his former NJPW rival, a returning Jay White. On July 26 at Redemption, Finlay and Connors defeated White and his Bang Bang Gang stablemate Juice Robinson in a Double Chain match due to interference from members of the Death Riders. On August 30 at All In, The Dogs failed to regain the AEW World Trios Championship in a Trios Roulette Royale. On September 26 at the Saturday Tailgate Brawl edition of All Out, Finlay and Connors teamed with Daniel Garcia and Wheeler Yuta of the Death Riders, in a losing effort against the Bang Bang Gang (Jay White, Ace Austin, Austin Gunn, and Colten Gunn) in a Tornado Tailgate Brawl, ending their feud.

On the October 21 episode of Dynamite, Finlay and Connors kicked Kidd out the group, and aligned with the Bang Bang Gang after attacking the Death Riders and the Conglomeration. After initially naming the alliance The Last Outfit on the October 24 episode of Collision, stable leader Jay White announced that the group would instead be known as The Cut. At Full Gear on November 14, The Cut defeated the Death Riders and the Conglomeration in Anarchy in the Arena.

== Personal life ==
Finlay grew up in a wrestling family and is a fourth-generation professional wrestler. His father David John Finlay is a retired professional wrestler best known under the ring names Fit Finlay and the mononym Finlay. His grandfather David Edward Clarke Finlay, as well as both of his great-grandfathers, William Finlay and John Liddell, were all professional wrestlers. His paternal aunt was a referee. His brother Brogan is also a professional wrestler, currently performing in WWE as Uriah Connors.

Finlay resides in Atlanta, Georgia. He was engaged to his girlfriend Ana Scott on 9 May 2017, and they were married on 13 May 2018. The couple's first child and son, Axel Ronan Finlay, was born on 17 May 2024—a day after Finlay's 31st birthday.

== Championships and accomplishments ==
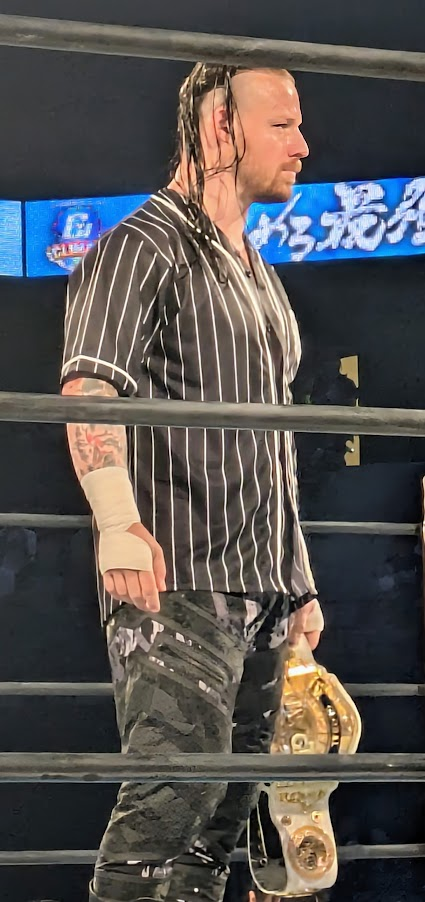
In NJPW, Finlay is a two-time IWGP Global Heavyweight Champion.

- All Elite Wrestling
  - AEW World Trios Championship (1 time) – with Clark Connors and Gabe Kidd
- Impact Wrestling
  - Impact World Tag Team Championship (1 time) – with Juice Robinson
- New Japan Pro-Wrestling
  - IWGP Global Heavyweight Championship (2 times, inaugural)
  - IWGP Tag Team Championship (1 time) – with Juice Robinson
  - NEVER Openweight Championship (1 time)
  - NEVER Openweight 6-Man Tag Team Championship (1 time) – with Ricochet and Satoshi Kojima
  - New Japan Cup (2025)
  - World Tag League (2019) – with Juice Robinson
- Power of Wrestling
  - POW Junior Championship (1 time)
- Pro Wrestling Illustrated
  - Ranked No. 49 of the top 500 singles wrestlers in the PWI 500 in 2024
