= Dave Finlay Sr. =

Retired professional wrestler

David Edward Clarke Finlay MBE (born 1936), better known as Dave Finlay Sr., is a Northern Irish retired professional wrestler, coach and promoter.

Finlay is the father of professional wrestler Fit Finlay, known for his tenures with WWE and on World of Sport, and the grandfather of David and Brogan Finlay.

== Career ==
Finlay formed a wrestling club in Greenisland in 1968, and remained a coach at the establishment until 2023. He was appointed MBE in the 2024 New Year Honours for his contribution to Olympic wrestling in Northern Ireland.

== Personal life ==
Finlay's wife, Evelyn, died on 11 September 2019.
