= J. W. McKinley =

American politician

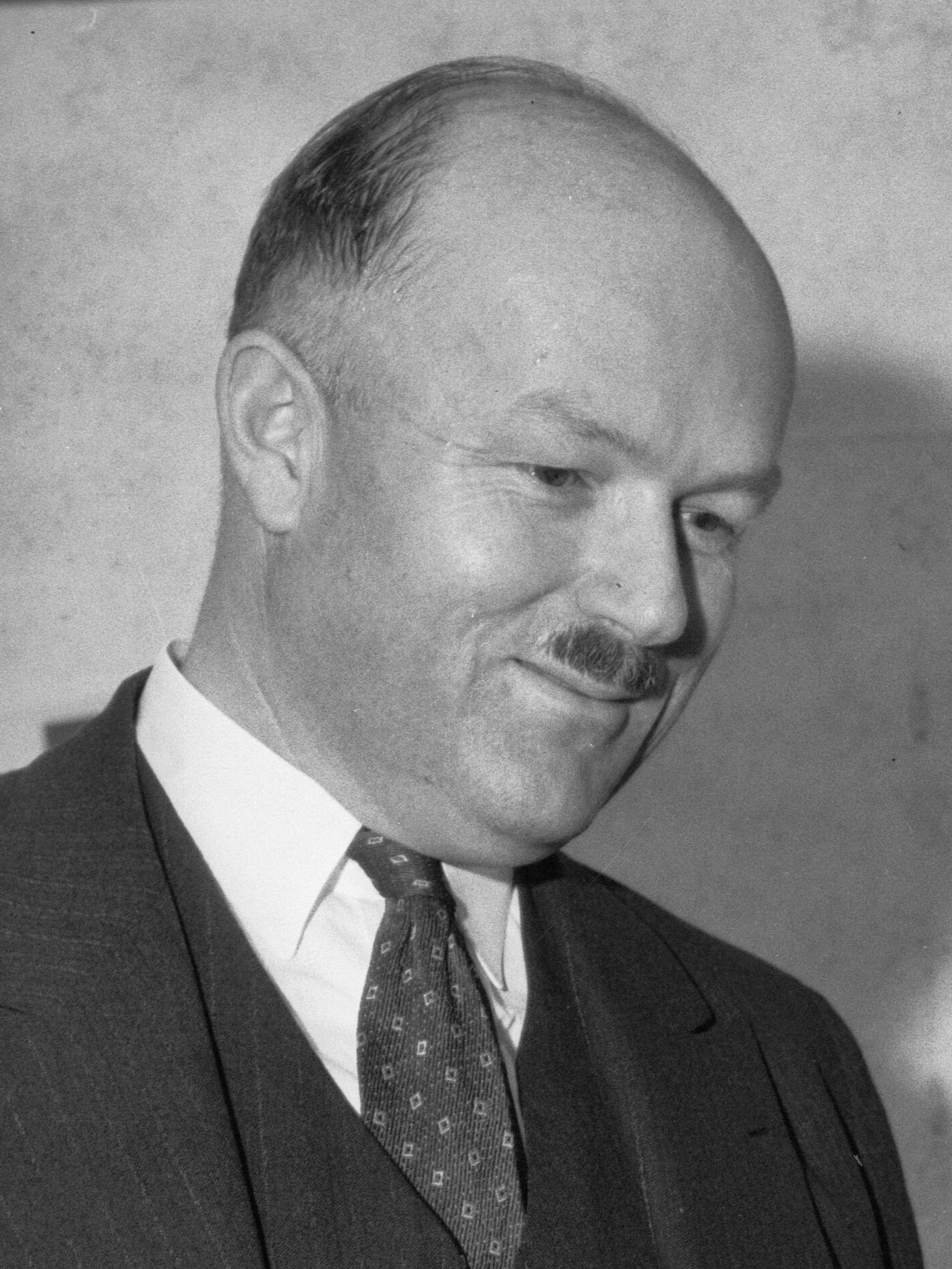
- McKinley in 1934

Member of the California Senate from the 38th district
- In office January 3, 1927 - January 7, 1935
- Preceded by: Charles H. V. Lewis
- Succeeded by: Culbert Olson

Personal details
- Born: July 8, 1891 Los Angeles, California, U.S.
- Died: August 3, 1957 (aged 66) Santa Barbara, California, U.S.
- Party: Republican
- Spouse: Selena Pope Ingram (after 1940)
- Relatives: James Wilfred McKinley (father)

Military service
- Allegiance: United States
- Branch/service: United States Army
- Battles/wars: World War I

James Wilfred McKinley Jr. (July 8, 1891 – August 3, 1957) served in the California State Senate and represented the 38th District.

== Personal ==
McKinley Jr. was the son of James Wilfred McKinley who was the Los Angeles City Attorney, and Judge for the Superior Court for the Los Angeles County. In 1918, McKinley served as President of the Los Angeles County Bar Association.

== Military ==
During World War I he served in the United States Army.
