= Bill McKinley (footballer) =

Australian rules footballer (1882–1952)

Personal information
- Full name: William Hamilton McKinlay
- Born: 24 March 1882; Geelong, Victoria
- Died: 19 April 1952 (aged 70); Geelong, Victoria
- Original team: Geelong West
- Height: 171 cm (5 ft 7 in)
- Weight: 73 kg (161 lb)
- Position: Halfback / Centre

Playing career^{1}
Years	Club	Games (Goals)
1903–08	Geelong	52 (0)
- ^{1} Playing statistics correct to the end of 1908.

William Hamilton McKinlay (24 March 1882 – 19 April 1952) was an Australian rules footballer who played with Geelong in the Victorian Football League (VFL).
