= Charles Finlayson (South African cricketer) =

South African cricketer

Charles Duncan Finlayson (25 February 1903 – 27 March 1953) was a South African cricketer who played four first class cricket matches for Eastern Province cricket team between 1926 and 1932.
