= Jesse McKinley =

American journalist

- Born: Jesse Underwood McKinley; 1970 (age 55–56); Kansas City, Missouri, U.S.
- Occupation: Journalist
- Years active: 1988–present

Jesse Underwood McKinley (born 1970) is an American journalist, currently the domestic correspondent for the Styles section of The New York Times covering politics, pop culture, and lifestyle. Previously he served as the paper’s Albany bureau chief and covered the COVID-19 pandemic.

== Early life and education ==
McKinley grew up in Kansas City, Missouri. He is the son of James C. McKinley, former University of Missouri, Kansas City (UMKC) English professor, editor of New Letters, and writer and Mary Ann Underwood, a former continuing education program manager also at UMKC. McKinley has three siblings: Older brother James C. McKinley Jr. is a long-time reporter and is currently an editor on the Metro desk at The New York Times specializing in criminal justice and law enforcement; brother Gabe McKinley also worked at The New York Times for over 12 years and is now a playwright; and sister Molly McKinley also worked at The Times before moving into a career in film and television as an editor and writer based out of Santa Fe, New Mexico.

In 1992, McKinley received a B.F.A. from New York University Tisch School of the Arts, where he was part of the Experimental Theatre Wing.

== Career ==
McKinley has worked at The New York Times in various capacities since 1988. When he was in college, his older brother was a reporter at The Times and got him a job as a copy boy. This led to eventually reporting on local news, covering a shooting at the World Trade Center, the Union Square train accident, and the 1989 anniversary of the Tompkins Square Park riot (1988).

From the early 1990s to the year 2000, McKinley worked as a freelance reporter. From 1994 to 1996, as a freelancer, McKinley wrote the FYI column for the City Weekly section of The New York Times, where he responded to reader questions about local trivia.

From 1996 to 1997, McKinley worked in San Francisco as a stringer for The New York Times, where he covered 1996's Proposition 209 aka California Civil Rights Initiative (CCRI), the 1997 Heaven's Gate suicides, and other breaking news.

In 1998, McKinley returned to New York and worked as a freelance reporter in the Culture section, where he covered Broadway and wrote the "On Stage and Off" column from 1998 to 2003. In 2000, McKinley was hired as a full time reporter at The New York Times, continuing to work on content for the Culture section until 2006.

In 2006, McKinley moved back to San Francisco, where he was the San Francisco bureau chief for The New York Times. During this time, he covered the 2008 California Proposition 8, a California ballot proposition and a state constitutional amendment that was against Same-sex marriage in California.

In 2014, during his tenure as the Albany bureau chief, McKinley was named as one of the top reporters working out of state capitals.

McKinley regularly appears on the WAMC audio podcast, The Capitol Connection, hosted by Alan Chartock.

During the COVID-19 pandemic, McKinley attended daily press briefings given by New York Governor Andrew Cuomo, covering Cuomo's response to the crisis.

According to Melissa DeRosa, Secretary to the Governor of New York and one of his closest top advisors, based on allegations she made in 2021 charging McKinley with sexual harassment, the Times conducted a months-long investigation and subsequently re-assigned McKinley from Albany bureau chief to the newly created position of "roving upstate reporter."

== Other work ==
In 1995, McKinley wrote the "Off Off Broadway" play called Quick Bright Things, which was loosely based on A Midsummer Night's Dream. He wrote a feature article about the experience for The New York Times. McKinley was a regular panelist on the Emmy-award winning nationally syndicated talk show about theater called Theater Talk, which aired on PBS and later CUNY TV.

McKinley has appeared in the 2003 FringeNYC festival in Bess Wohl's play, Cats Talk Back and also, in 2007, in a San Francisco-based installment of Literary Death Match called "Cyrillic Battle to the Death".

== Personal life ==
In 2003, McKinley married Lindsey Gates. The marriage ended in divorce, which he wrote about in a 2012 piece for The New York Times.

== Selected works ==
- McKinley, Jesse (29 January 1995). "How I Survived Off Off Broadway: One Man's Tale". The New York Times.
- ––– (15 October 1995). "F.Y.I.: A Cup of Inspiration". The New York Times.
- ––– (27 April 1997). "In 1992, a Runaway Car Left Lives in Tatters. For Many, the Healing Is Not Over". The New York Times.
- ––– (4 July 2000). "Film Fantasy As a Tonic For Refugee Children". The New York Times.
- ––– (14 January 2001). "Theater; The Truth About Jerzy May Never Be Known". The New York Times.
- ––– (6 May 2001). "It's a Small World, And It Rocks!". The New York Times.
- ––– Johnson, Kirk (14 November 2008). "Mormons Tipped Scale in Ban on Gay Marriage". The New York Times.
- ––– (22 April 2009). "Attorney General Challenges Anti-Bias Law in California". The New York Times.
- ––– (25 March 2009). "Cities Deal With a Surge in Shantytowns". The New York Times.
- ––– (10 January 2010). "Two Ideological Foes Unite to Overturn Proposition 8". The New York Times.
- ––– (20 May 2011). "At Apocalypse Central, Preparing for What Happens, or Doesn't". The New York Times.
- ––– (14 December 2012). "Cleansing the Toxins of Divorce". The New York Times.
- ––– & Grynbaum, Michael M. (22 January 2015). "Silver's Case May Have Vast Impact and Alter Entrenched Way of Governance". The New York Times.
- ––– & Rojas, Rick (15 June 2015). "Quebec? Italy? No Shortage of Theories on Escaped Convicts' Whereabouts". The New York Times.
- ––– & McKinley, Jr, James C. (10 January 2016). "Cuomo Proposes Higher-Education Initiative in New York Prisons". The New York Times.
- ––– & Goldmacher, Shane (24 March 2020). "How Cuomo, Once on Sidelines, Became the Politician of the Moment". The New York Times.
- ––– & Ferré-Sadurní, Luis (14 April 2020). "After Mocking 'King' Trump, Cuomo Says Virus Should Be 'No-Politics Zone'". The New York Times.
