= Brogan Finlay =

American professional wrestler (born 2002)

Personal information
- Born: August 26, 2002 (age 23) Atlanta, Georgia, U.S.
- Parent: Fit Finlay (father)
- Relatives: David Finlay (brother); Dave Finlay Sr. (grandfather)

Professional wrestling career
- Ring name(s): Brogan Finlay; Uriah Connors
- Billed height: 6 ft 2 in (188 cm)
- Billed weight: 91 kg (201 lb)
- Billed from: Atlanta, Georgia
- Trained by: AR Fox; Fit Finlay; WWA4 Wrestling School
- Debut: 22 December 2021

Brogan Finlay (born 26 August 2002) is an American professional wrestler. He is signed to WWE, where he performs on the NXT brand under the ring name Uriah Connors. He is a member of the BirthRight stable.

Finlay is a fourth-generation professional wrestler, being the son of Fit Finlay, grandson of Dave Finlay Sr, and great-grandson of John Lidell.

== Professional wrestling career ==
=== Independent circuit (2021–2023) ===
Finlay debuted in 2021 on the independent circuit. On 26 September 2021, he made his NJPW Strong debut, teaming with his brother David Finlay. On 20 August 2022, he made his Game Changer Wrestling debut at GCW Hope To Die.

=== WWE (2023–present) ===
==== Debut; Chase University (2023–2025) ====
In December 2023, it was reported that Finlay had signed with WWE.

On 5 March 2024, at NXT: Roadblock, Finlay made his WWE debut under the ring name Uriah Connors, losing to Shawn Spears.

In 2024, Connors formed a tag team with Kale Dixon. In early 2025, they became involved in a storyline with Andre Chase leading to the reformation of the Chase University stable. On the 22 April 2025 episode of NXT, Chase University was reformed with Connors and Dixon.

==== BirthRight (2026–present) ====
On the 3 February 2026 episode of NXT, Connors turned heel after walking out on Chase University and joining Lexis King, Channing "Stacks" Lorenzo, Arianna Grace, and Charlie Dempsey. The group later became known as BirthRight, which consists of second generation WWE wrestlers–Connors as the son of Fit Finlay; King as the son of Brian Pillman; Lorenzo as the fiancé of Grace, who is the daughter of Santino Marrella; and Dempsey as the son of William Regal. At the NXT Stand & Deliver countdown show on April 4, BirthRight teamed together for the first time where they lost to Hank and Tank, Shiloh Hill, EK Prosper, and Wren Sinclair in a 10-person mixed tag team match.

== Championships and accomplishments ==
- TWE Chattanooga
  - TWE Tag Team Championship (1 time) – with Pete Youngblood and Damion Turner
