= William Weir (aviator) =

World War I flying ace

William James Alexander Weir
- Born: 4 April 1891; Leichhardt, New South Wales
- Died: 28 September 1917 (aged 26)
- Military career
- Allegiance: Australia
- Branch: Australian Imperial Force (1914–17); Australian Flying Corps (1917–18)
- Service years: 1914–1918
- Rank: Lieutenant
- Unit: No. 1 Squadron AFC
- Awards: Distinguished Flying Cross

William James Alexander Weir, DFC (born 4 April 1891) was an Australian flying ace of the First World War credited with six aerial victories. He received the Distinguished Flying Cross for "conspicuous gallantry in air combats and attacking ground objectives".
