= Hämeensilta =

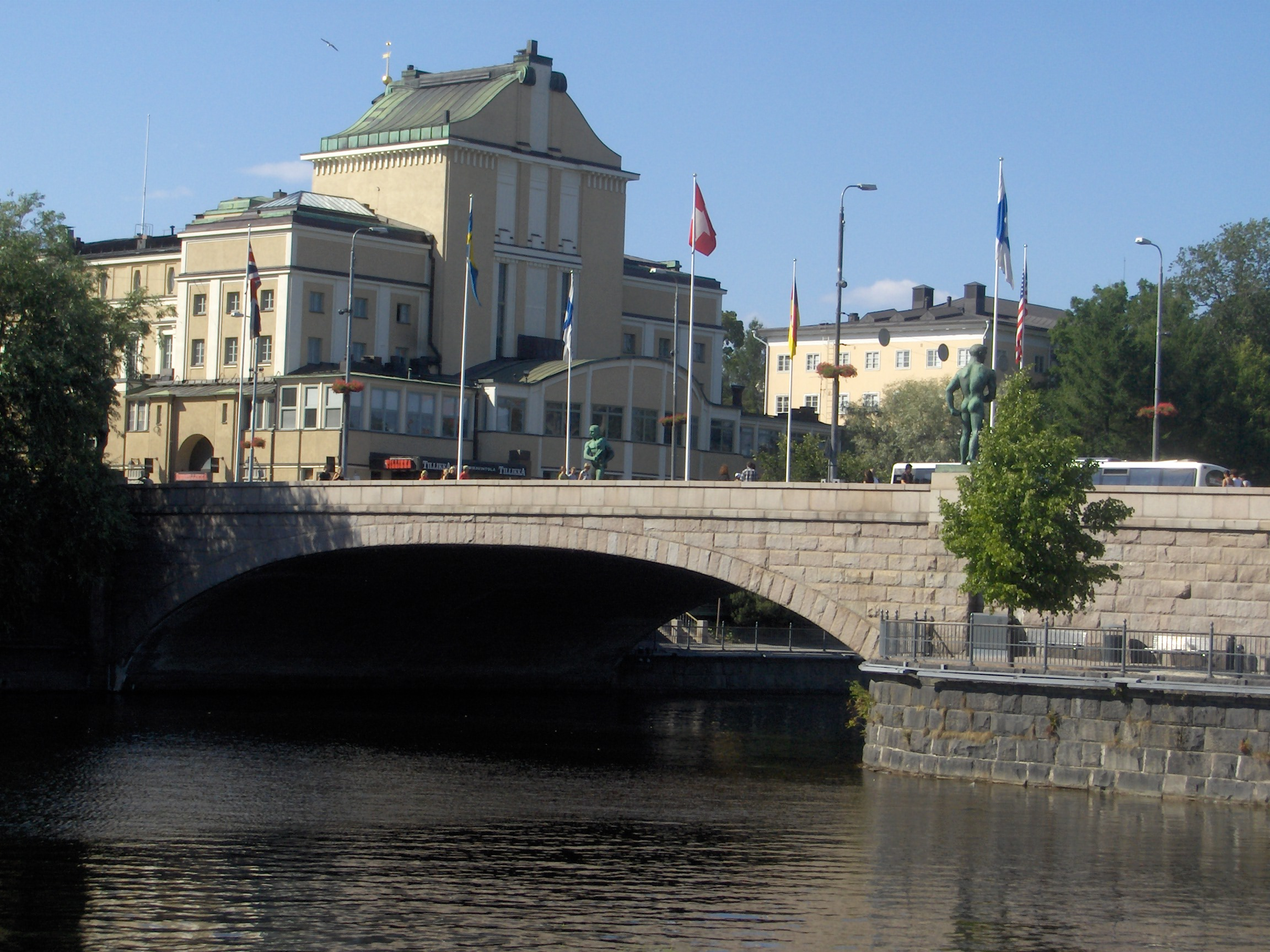
- Hämeensilta and the Tampere Theatre
- Coordinates: 61°29′52.5″N 023°45′49.0″E
- Carries: cars, bicycles, pedestrians
- Crosses: Tammerkoski
- Locale: Tampere, Finland

Characteristics
- Design: Arch
- Material: Stone
- Total length: 68 m (223 ft)
- Width: 28.5 m (94 ft)
- Clearance above: 40 m (131 ft)

History
- Opened: 1929

Hämeensilta (the ″Häme Bridge″) is a bridge in Tampere, Finland, crossing the Tammerkoski rapids. The main street of Tampere, Hämeenkatu, runs along the bridge, connecting the Kyttälä district to the western parts of the city center. Hämeensilta is one of the city's best known landmarks, especially famous for the statues on the rails of the bridge. The arches of the bridge are made of concrete and they are coated with a red granite. The 68-metre-long (223 ft) Hämeensilta was completed in 1929. It is named after the Finnish name of the Tavastia province.

== History ==
The first known bridge crossing the Tammerkoski was built in the 16th century as the area was a part of the Messukylä socken. As the town of Tampere was established in 1779, the wooden bridge was finally replaced with a steel structured in 1884. During the early 1900s, Tampere was rapidly growing and the present Hämeensilta was built in 1928–1929. The 1900 completed Satakunnansilta is the other large bridge crossing Tammerkoski in the Tampere city center.

== Sculptures ==
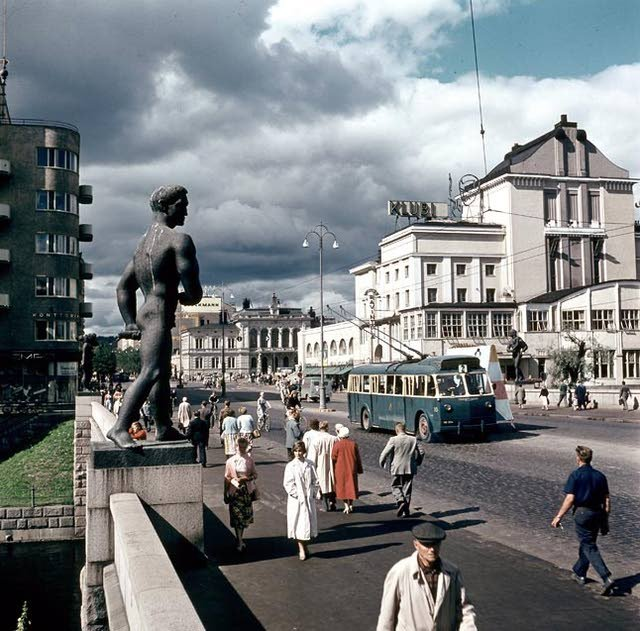
Tampere viewed from Hämeensilta in the 1950s

The 4.5 metres (15 ft) tall bronze statues were donated by the local businessman Rafael Haarla and made by the prominent Finnish sculptor Wäinö Aaltonen. One is a female figure of the Finnish Maiden, while the other three, the Tax Collector, the Merchant and the Hunter, are describing Medieval birkarls. The Maiden of Finland is featured on a postage stamp and in 1939 it was on display at the World's Fair in New York City.

== See also ==
- Erkkilän silta
