= Satakunnankatu =

Very busy road in Tampere

Coordinates: 61°30′01.30450″N 23°45′17.68957″E

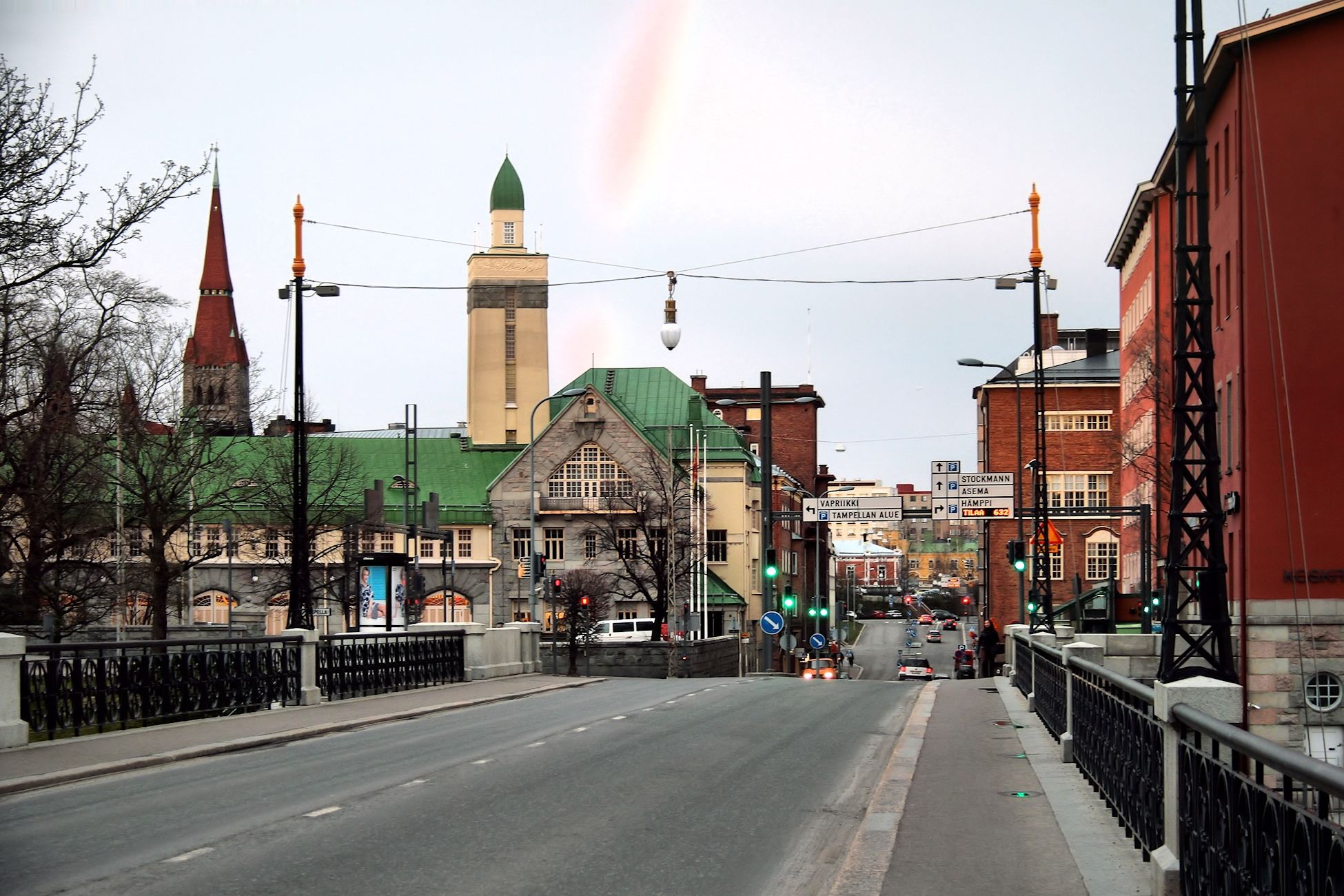
Landscape along Satakunnankatu. View from the Satakunta Bridge to the east.

Satakunnankatu is an east–west, busy street in the center of Tampere, Finland, which is one of the city's main streets. It starts from the vicinity of Tampere Cathedral on the east side of Tammerkoski, where it separates the Jussinkylä and Kyttälä Districts. The street crosses the rapids along the Satakunta Bridge (Satakunnansilta) and runs on the west side between Finlayson and the Hämeenpuisto park. From there it continues through the Amuri area to the Pirkankatu street.

Satakunnankatu is part of the nationally significant industrial landscape of Tammerkoski, and there are several sites along it that are valuable for architecture, cultural history and the cityscape. The street is bordered by, among other things, the former weaving building Plevna (1877), which belongs to the Finlayson factory area, where the first electric lighting in the Nordic countries and the then Russian Empire was introduced in 1882. Other nationally significant buildings on Satakunnankatu include the Central Fire Station designed by Wivi Lönn (1907) and the Hotel Tammer (1928) designed by Bertel Strömmer.

The current street name Satakunnankatu (meaning "Satakunta Street") was marked in the Tampere's town plan in 1907. However, the history of the street is older. Initially, there have been two streets with different names, Uusikatu ("New Street") and Uudensillankatu ("New Bridge Street"), which the Tammerkoski rapids has separated from each other.

The first and oldest part of the street is located in the area which nowadays stretches from Aleksis Kiven katu to Näsilinnankatu. This area, west of the rapids, was designed by geographic surveyor Daniel Hall (1739–1803) in 1775. Hall's plan later became Tampere's first zoning plan, taking effect in 1779. On the first city maps of Tampere the streets had no names. The name Uusikatu was invented by a committee appointed in 1807 to name the streets. The name was entered into the map in the 1820s when the geographic surveyor Johan Wallenius (1765–1849) was designing a new zoning plan. Wallenius used the Swedish language name Ny Gatan for the street. On his map the street had grown in length to the west and reached Kortelahdenkatu (at that time named Brahe Lång Gatan or Brahen Pitkäkatu). Uusikatu became the street's official name in 1868. The street was repeatedly lengthened to the west, and because of heightened fire safety after the Tampere fire of 1865 it was partly widened as a boulevard.

The eastern side of the rapids was connected to Tampere from the parish of Messukylä in 1877. The city architect F. L. Calonius made a town plan for the area, where the main eastern part of Satakunnankatu was the main frame street. The name of the street first appeared in the draft town plan (1879) in the form Uudensillankatu. The name Uudensillankatu was officialized in 1886. Uusisilta referred to the Satakunta Bridge, which was built only later, in 1897–1900. The Satakunta Bridge apparently caused the decision to change Uusikatu and Uudensillankatu to Satakunnankatu in the 1907 town plan change.

== Perpendicular streets from east to west ==
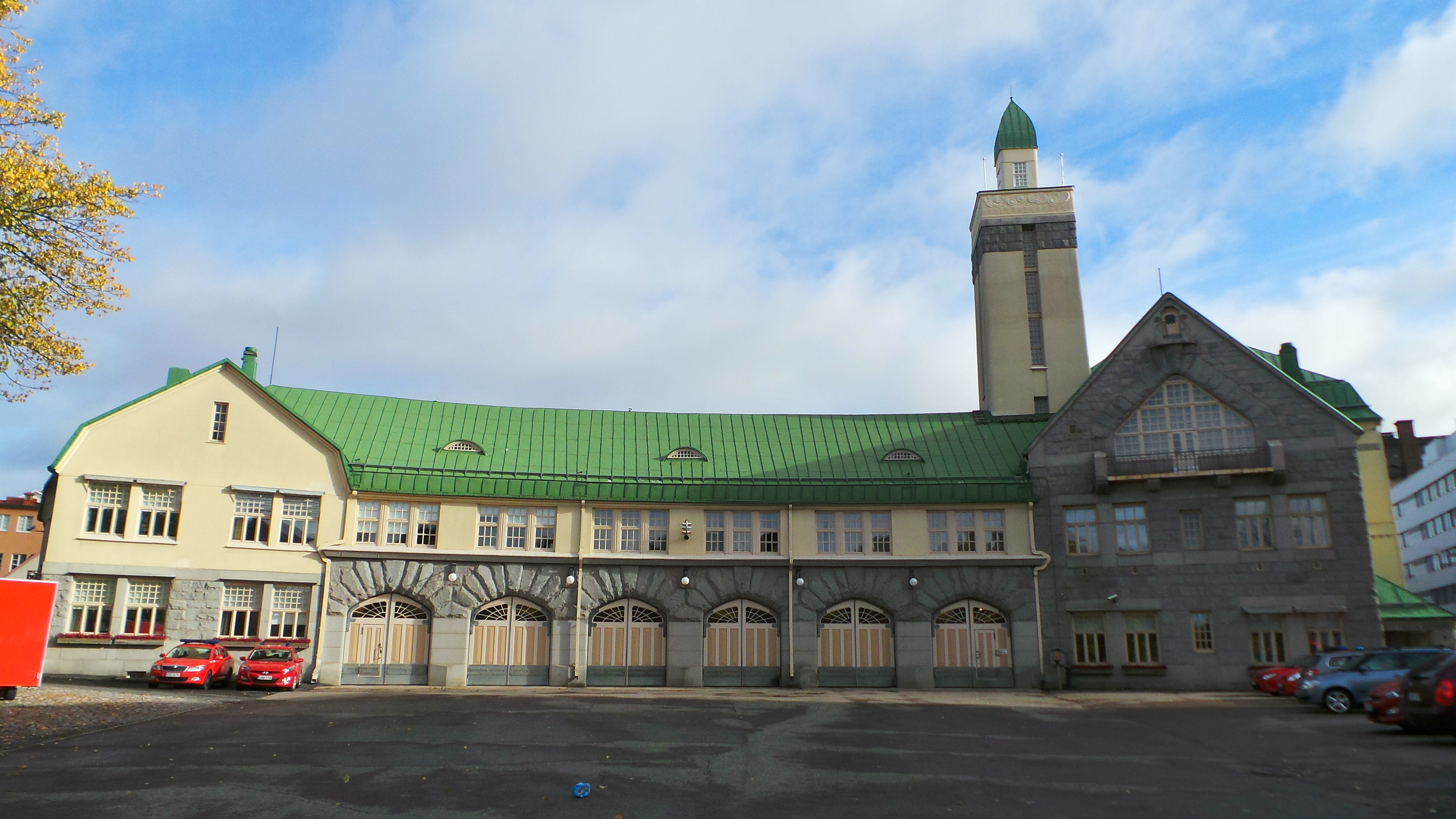
The Tampere Central Fire Station at the intersection of Satakunnankatu and Lapintie.

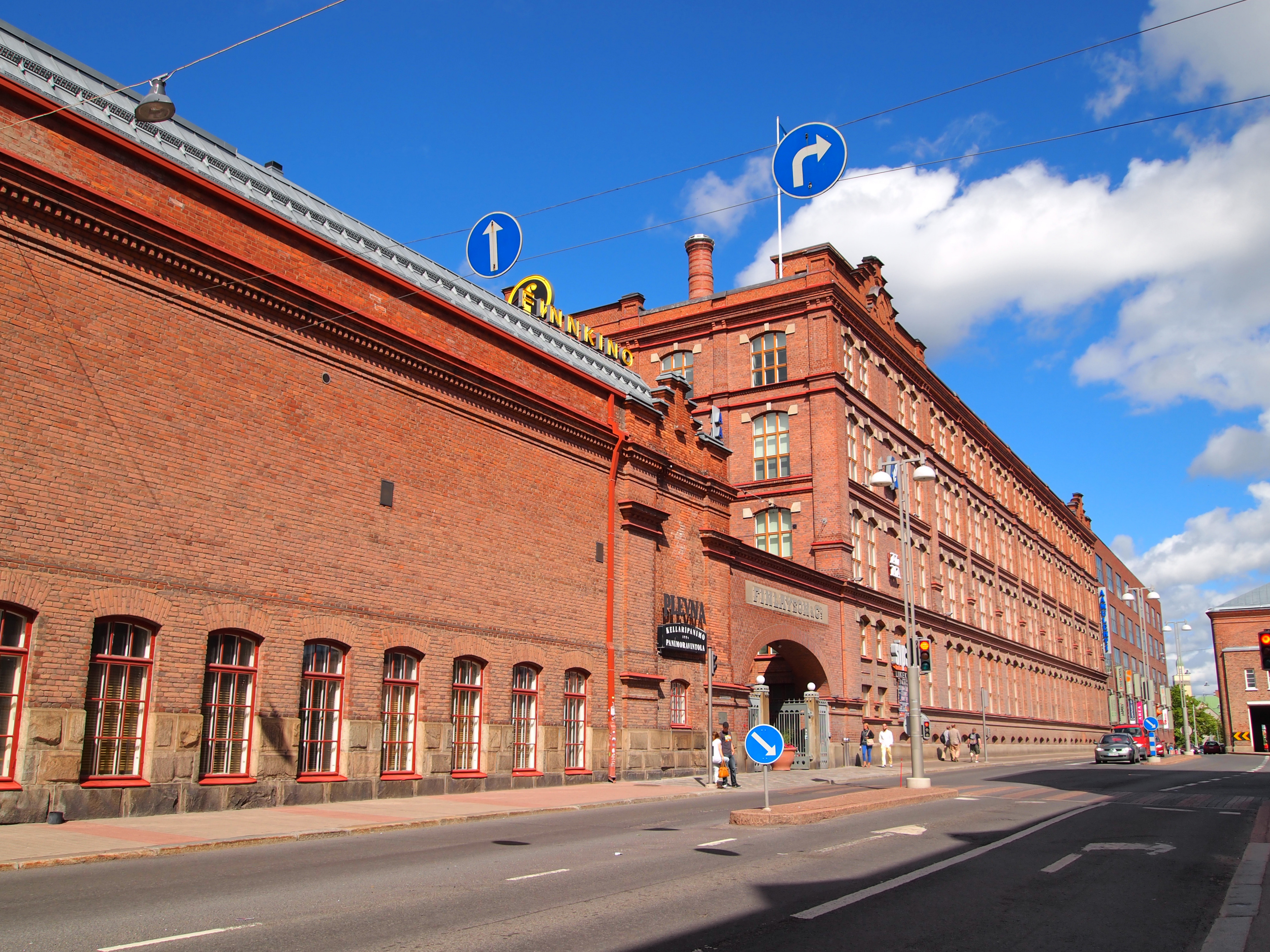
Facade of the Plevna building on Satakunnankatu.

=== East of Tammerkoski ===
- Rautatienkatu
- Tuomiokirkonkatu
- Aleksanterinkatu
- Pellavatehtaankatu (to the right) / Rongankatu (to the left)

=== West of Tammerkoski ===
- Itäinenkatu (to the right from the Finlayson gate) / Aleksis Kiven katu (to the left)
- Kuninkaankatu
- Näsilinnankatu
- Hämeenpuisto
- Mustanlahdenkatu
- Kortelahdenkatu
- Sotkankatu
- Sepänkatu

== Sources ==
=== Further reading ===
- Maija Louhivaara (1999). Tampereen kadunnimet (in Finnish). Tampere: Tampereen museot. ISBN 951-609-105-9.
- Olli Helen & Jouko Seppänen (2015). Tampere kartalla (in Finnish). Tampere: The Tampere Society (Tampere-Seura). ISBN 978-952-5558-23-4.
- Tampereen kantakaupungin rakennuskulttuuri 1998 (in Finnish). Tampere: Tampereen kaupungin kaavoitusyksikkö. 1998. ISBN 951-609-076-1.
