= Jussinkylä =

City district in Tampere, Finland

Coordinates: 61°30′10″N 23°46′05″E

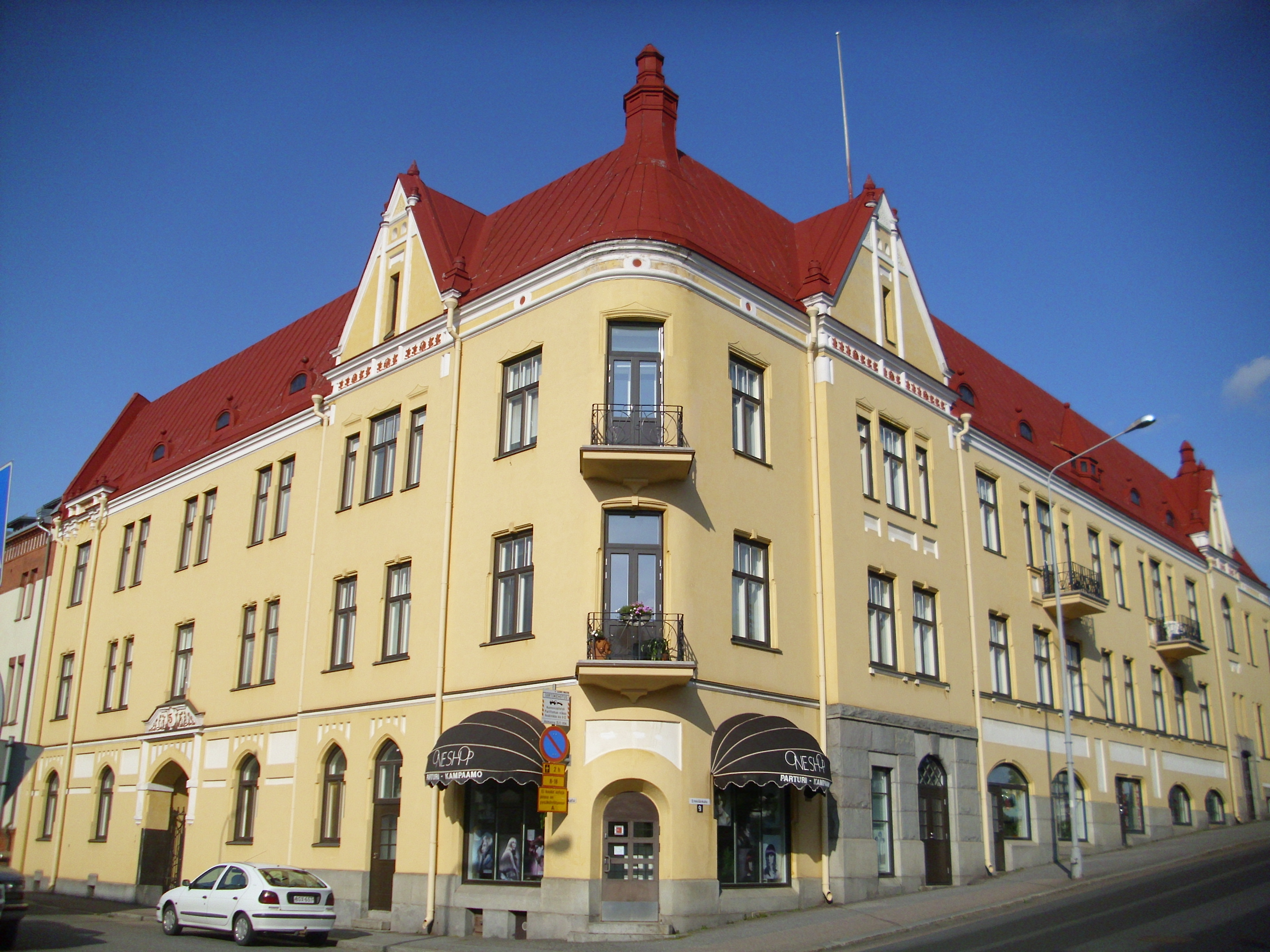
Schreck house at Erkkilänkatu in Jussinkylä

Jussinkylä (also known as Juhannuskylä) is a neighbourhood in the city center of Tampere, Finland. It is located east of Tammerkoski and borders Satakunnankatu in the south. To the east and northeast, the district is bounded by a railway and to the northwest by Lapintie. The Erkkilä Bridge (Erkkilän silta) connects Jussinkylä to Tammela. The most significant landmarks in the area are Tampere Cathedral and Tampere Central Fire Station. Neighboring neighborhoods are Finlayson, Tampella and Kyttälä, from which the latter runs a route along the Tuomiokirkonkatu street.

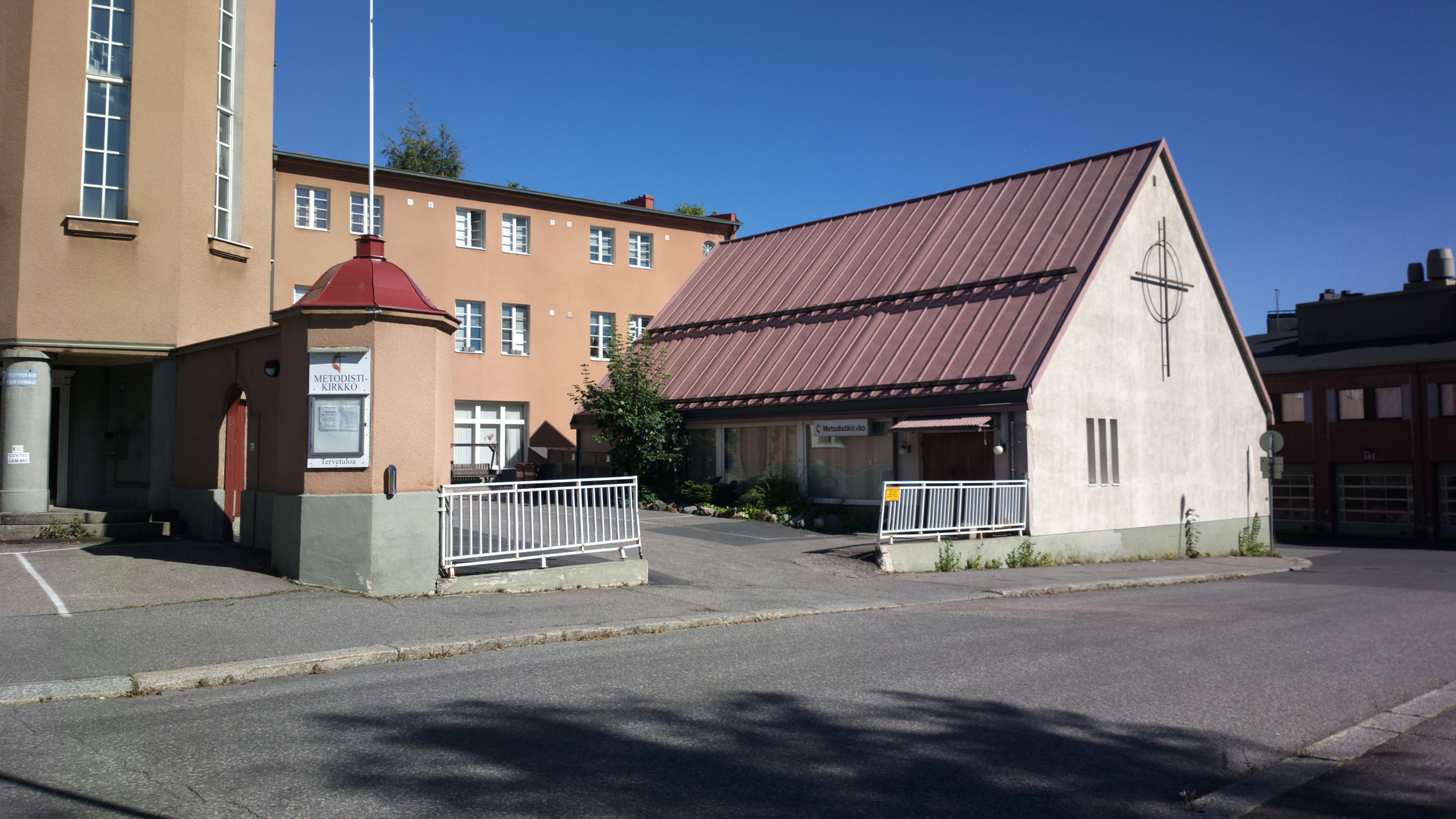
Methodist church in Jussinkylä

The background to the name of the district is unknown, but it has been in use since at least the 1870s. It may refer to a person named Johannes, or even to the celebration of Midsummer.

== Sources ==
- Jutikkala Eino: Tampereen historia III, Tampere 1979.
- Rasila Viljo: Tampereen historia II, Tampere 1984.
- Tampereen kantakaupungin rakennuskulttuuri, Tampere 1998.
