= Tampere Central Fire Station =

Fire station in Tampere, Finland

Coordinates: 61°30′05″N 23°45′55″E

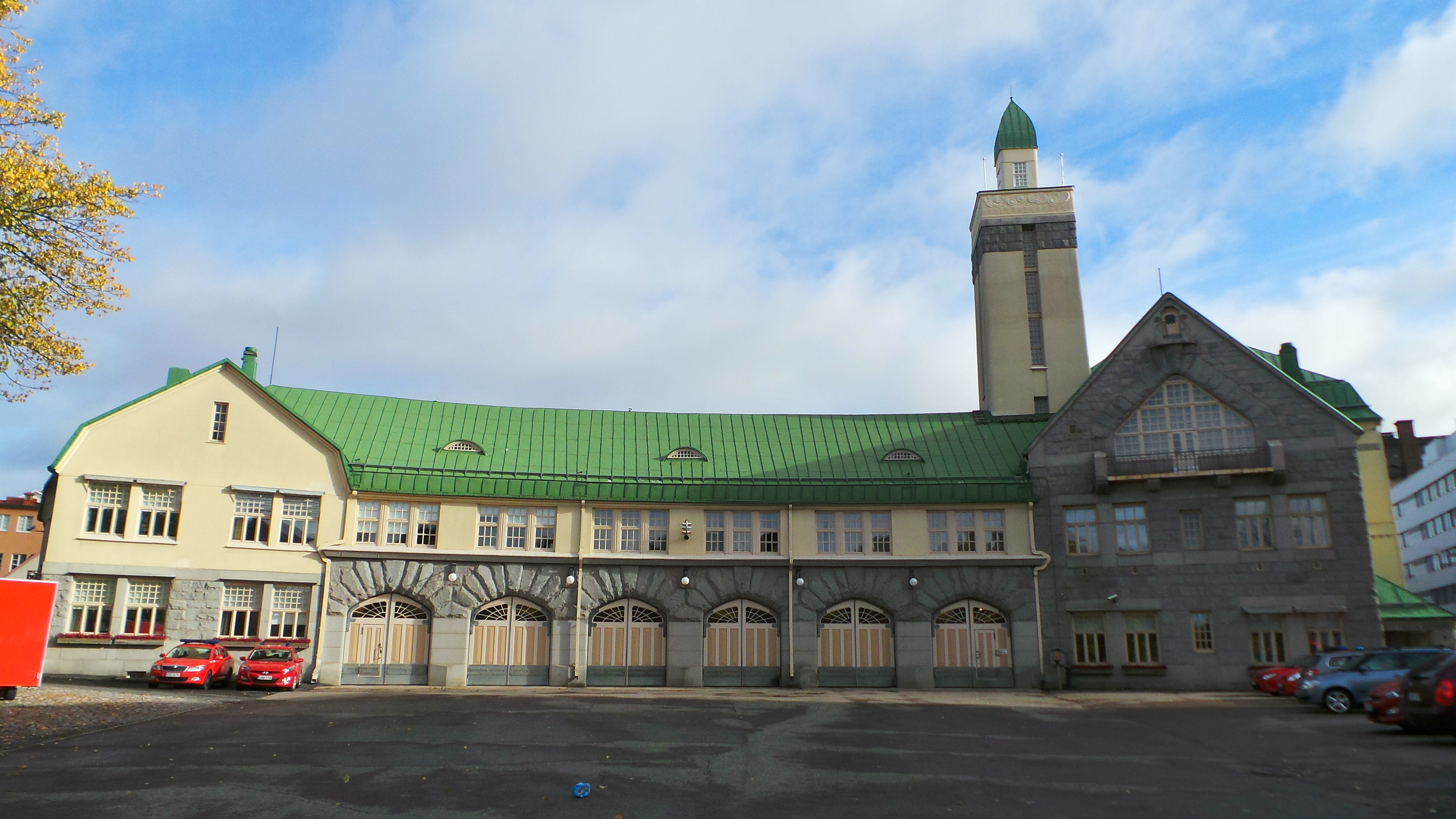
The Central Fire Station in October 2013

The Tampere Central Fire Station (Finnish: Tampereen keskuspaloasema) is a fire station located at Satakunnankatu 16 in the Jussinkylä, Tampere, Finland, on the eastern shore of Tammerkoski. The Art Nouveau-style fire station building, completed in 1908, was designed by architect Wivi Lönn.

== History ==
A permanent fire brigade was established in Tampere on 5 July 1898, and a voluntary fire brigade had been established in the city as early as 1873. The permanent fire brigade initially operated in temporary premises in the merchant Axel Siren's house at Puutarhakatu 6. An estate of land was built for the building along Satakunnankatu in 1903, and in 1905 a fire station design competition was held, which was won in February 1906 by architect Wivi Lönn. The Malmö's fire station in Sweden must have been used as an example in the design of the fire station.

== Design and construction ==
The station was originally designed for horse-drawn equipment and the horse stables and equipment hall were located in the curved center of the station. Architect Berndt Blom, who acted as Tampere's firefighter, also contributed to the functional design of the station. Construction work on the fire station began in April 1907 and the building was commissioned on September 30, 1908. Completion of the building was delayed by four months on the construction site on Christmas Eve 1907 due to a fire that broke out. The building was made of brick but also used reinforced concrete structures. The facades were upholstered in granite. The fire station also included a fire tower.

In the 1920s, alterations were carried out at the fire station according to the plans of Tampere city architect Bertel Strömmer, when cars replaced horse-drawn equipment. In this context, the curved central part of the building was also raised by one floor, which was occupied by crew quarters. In 1982, a red-brick annex was completed for the fire station on the Palokunnankatu side and then for the fire station's so-called the old part was renovated in 1983–1986.

== Museum ==
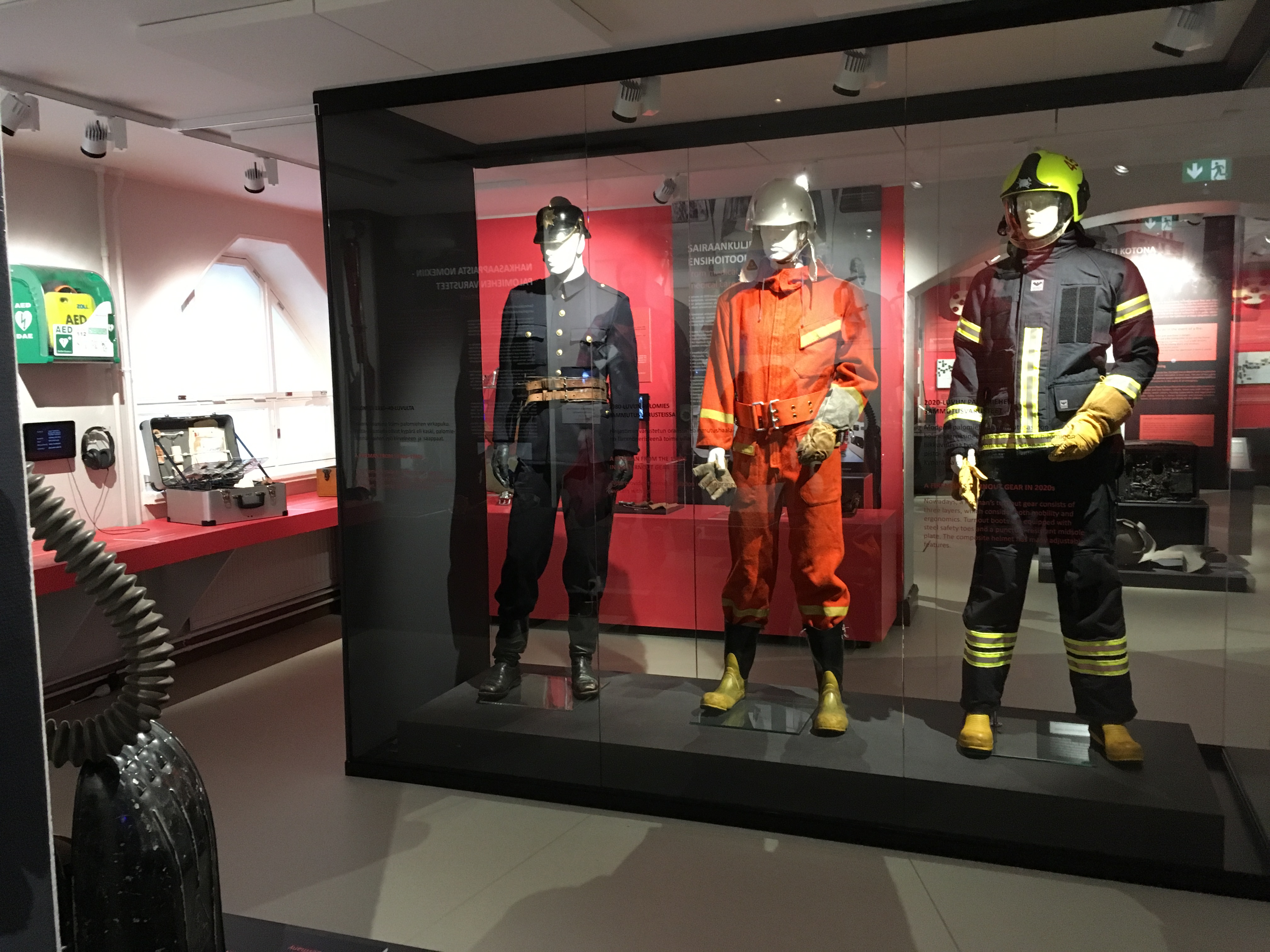
The Tampere Fire Museum in October 2019

The Tampere Fire Museum (Finnish: Tampereen palomuseo), founded in 1998, is located in the basement of the Central Fire Station. The renovated fire museum was opened to the public on the 2019 Tampere Day.
