= Satakunnansilta =

Street bridge in Tampere, Finland

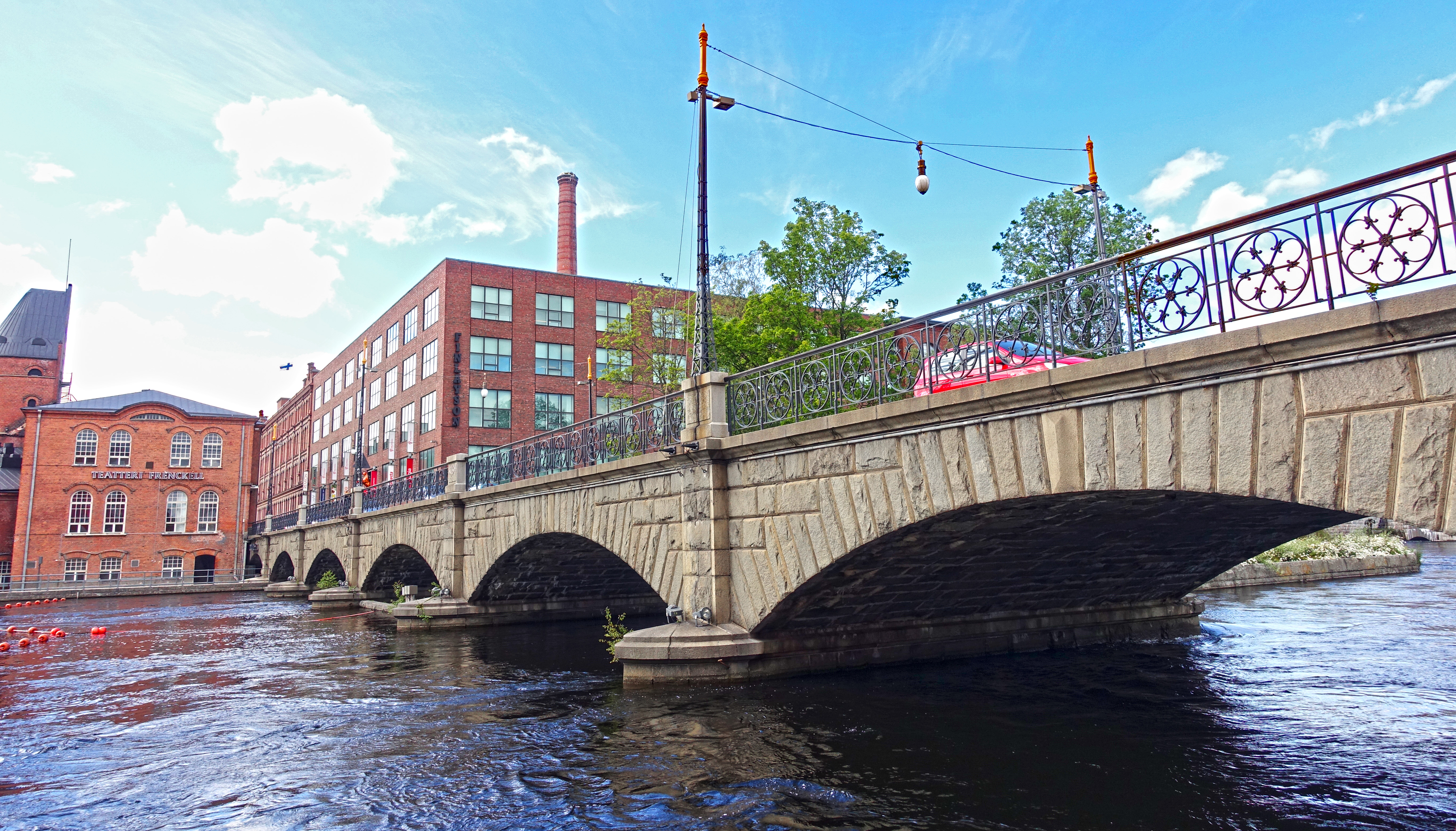
- Satakunta Bridge in July 2018
- Coordinates: 61°30′03.5″N 023°45′44.0″E
- Crosses: Tammerkoski
- Locale: Tampere, Finland

Characteristics
- Design: Arch bridge
- Material: Stone
- Total length: 127 m (417 ft)
- Width: 12 m (39 ft)

History
- Opened: October 9, 1900

Statistics
- Daily traffic: Vehicles and pedestrians

Satakunnansilta (the ″Satakunta Bridge″) is an old bridge in Tampere, Finland, that crosses the Tammerkoski rapids north of Hämeensilta. The bridge is part of the Satakunnankatu street and is used by both vehicle traffic and pedestrians.

The Satakunta Bridge was designed by engineer Karl Snellman, son of Senator J. V. Snellman. It was built between 1897 and 1900 and commissioned on October 9, 1900. The bridge is a 6-span stone arch bridge with spans of 17 meters. The width of the bridge is 11.75 meters and its total length is 112.6 meters.

In 2013, the bridge railings were refurbished to the original model, and in 2014, the bridge lamps were replaced with the original model.
