= Tied-arch bridge =

Type of bridge

Generic tied-arch bridge with a movable support on the right side.

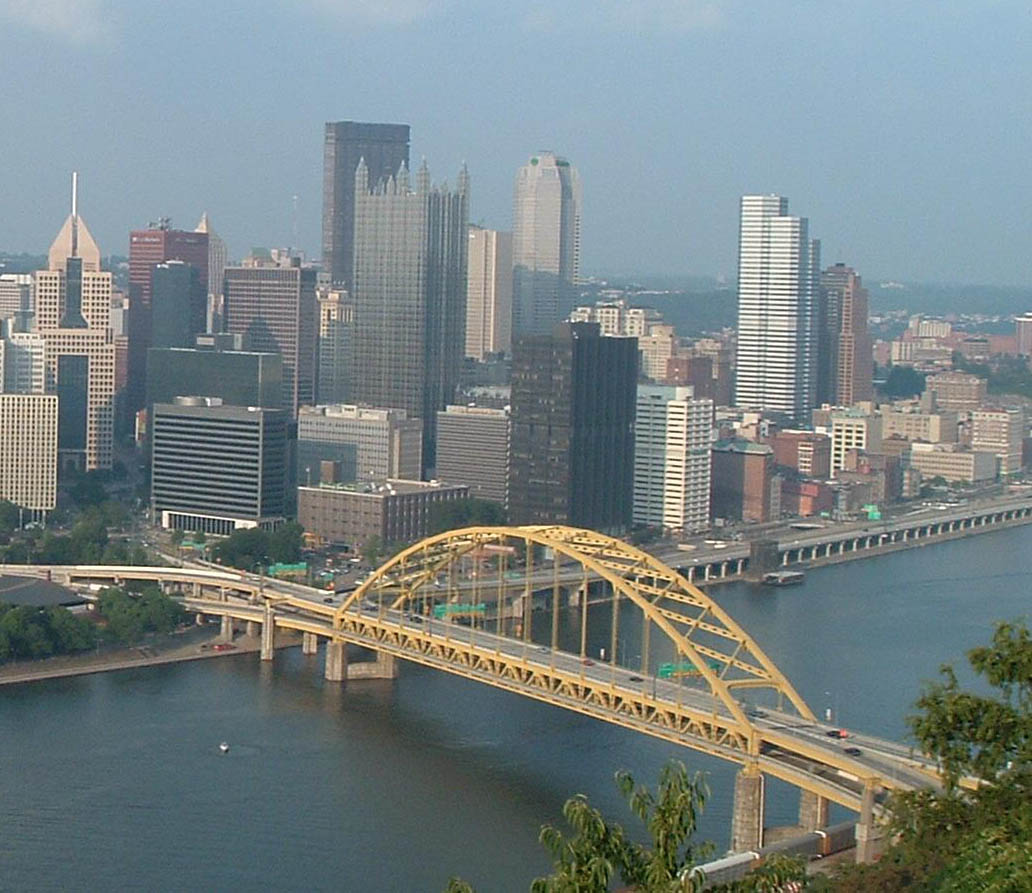
The Fort Pitt Bridge. The arches terminate atop slender raised piers and are tied by the road deck structure.

A tied-arch bridge, sometimes known as a Stabbogen bridge, is an arch bridge in which the outward-directed horizontal forces of the arch(es) are borne as tension by a chord tying the arch ends rather than by the ground or the bridge foundations. This strengthened chord may be the deck structure itself or consist of separate, independent tie-rods.

== Description ==
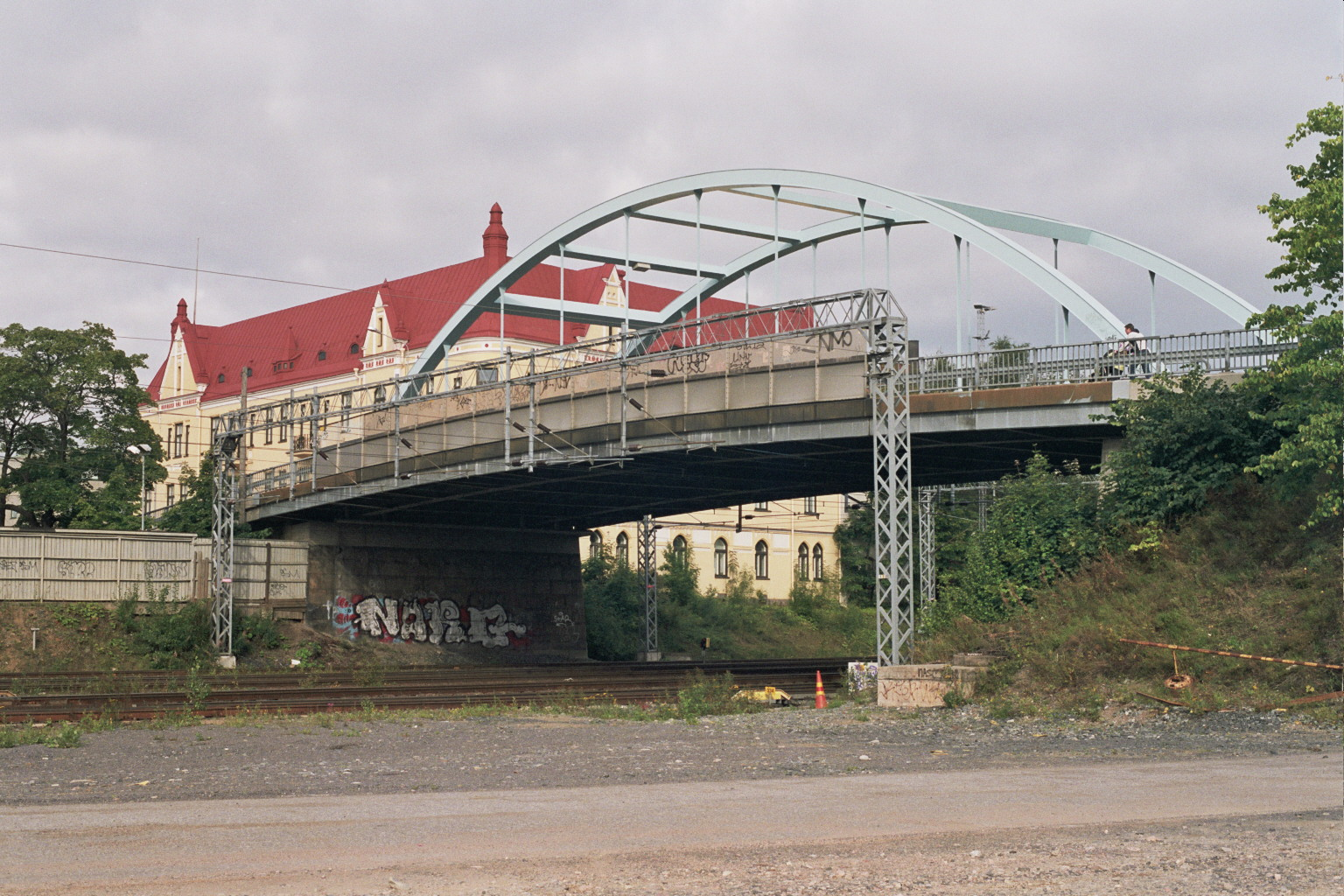
Erkkilä Bridge in Tampere, Finland

Thrusts downwards on a tied-arch bridge deck are translated as tension by vertical ties between the deck and the arch, tending to flatten it and thereby to push its tips outward into the abutments, like for other arch bridges. However, in a tied-arch or bowstring bridge, these movements are restrained not by the abutments but by the strengthened chord, which ties these tips together, taking the thrusts as tension, rather like the string of a bow that is being flattened. Therefore, the design is also called a bowstring-arch or bowstring-girder bridge.

The elimination of horizontal forces at the abutments allows tied-arch bridges to be constructed with less robust foundations; thus they can be situated atop elevated piers or in areas of unstable soil. In addition, since they do not depend on horizontal compression forces for their integrity, tied-arch bridges can be prefabricated offsite, and subsequently floated, hauled or lifted into place. Notable bridges of this type include the Fremont Bridge in Portland, Oregon, and the first "computer-designed" bridge of this type, the Fort Pitt Bridge in Pittsburgh, Pennsylvania.

Both the tied-arch bridge and the self-anchored suspension bridge place only vertical loads on the anchorage, and so are suitable where large horizontal forces are difficult to anchor.

The design originated from Germany, where it is known as a Stabbogen, from the German word for a tied-arch, where it became popular due to the aesthetics and potential weight saving advantages. The deck section could be constructed with plate, lattice or Vierendeel girders.

== Variants ==
=== Shouldered tied-arch ===
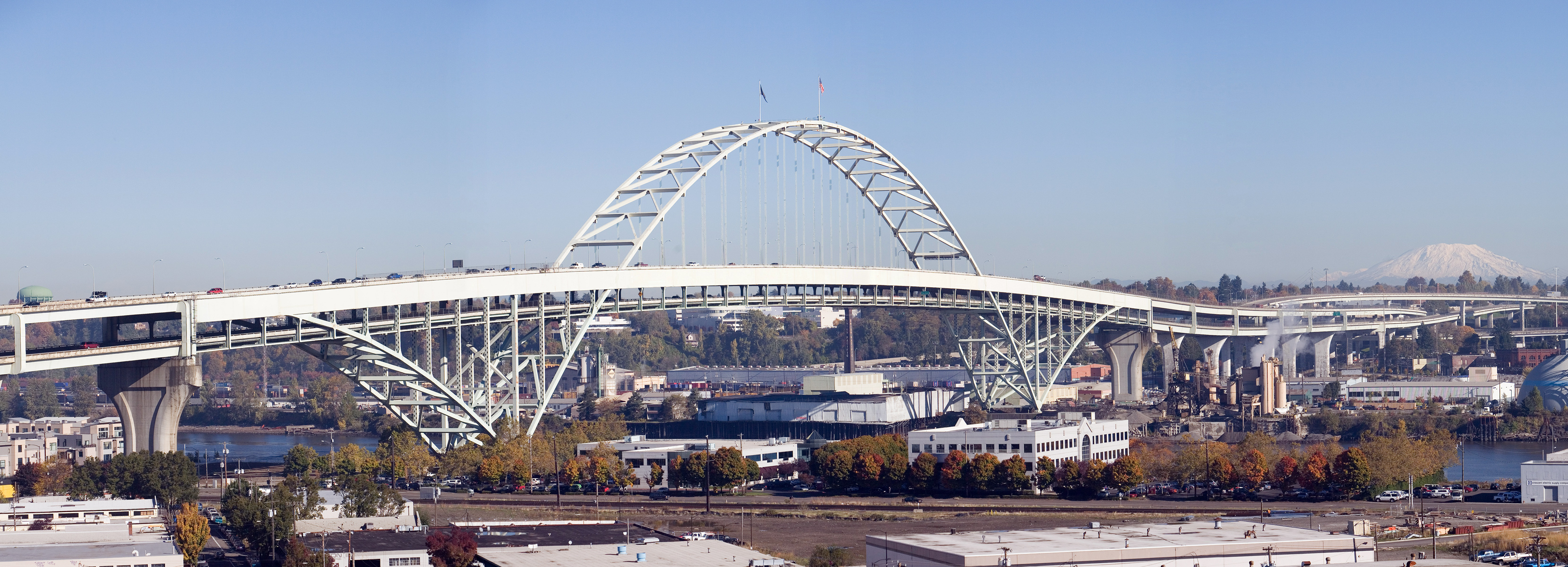
Fremont Bridge in Portland, Oregon.

Chaotianmen Bridge in Chongqing (lateral view diagram)

Some tied-arch bridges only tie a segment of the main arch directly and prolong the strengthened chord to tie to the top ends of auxiliary (half-)arches. The latter usually support the deck from below and join their bottom feet to those of the main arch(es). The supporting piers at this point may be slender, because the outward-directed horizontal forces of main and auxiliary arch ends counterbalance. The whole structure is self-anchored. Like the simple case it exclusively places vertical loads on all ground-bound supports.

An example is the Fremont Bridge in Portland, Oregon which is the second-longest tied-arch bridge in the world and also classifies as a through arch bridge. The Chaotianmen Bridge in Chongqing is a tied-arch, through arch and a truss arch bridge.

Contrarily, the Hart Bridge uses a cantilevered trussed arch, it is self-anchored, but its arch is non-tied. In particular the bridge deck is suspended, but does not tie the arch ends.

=== Multi-span discrete tied-arch ===
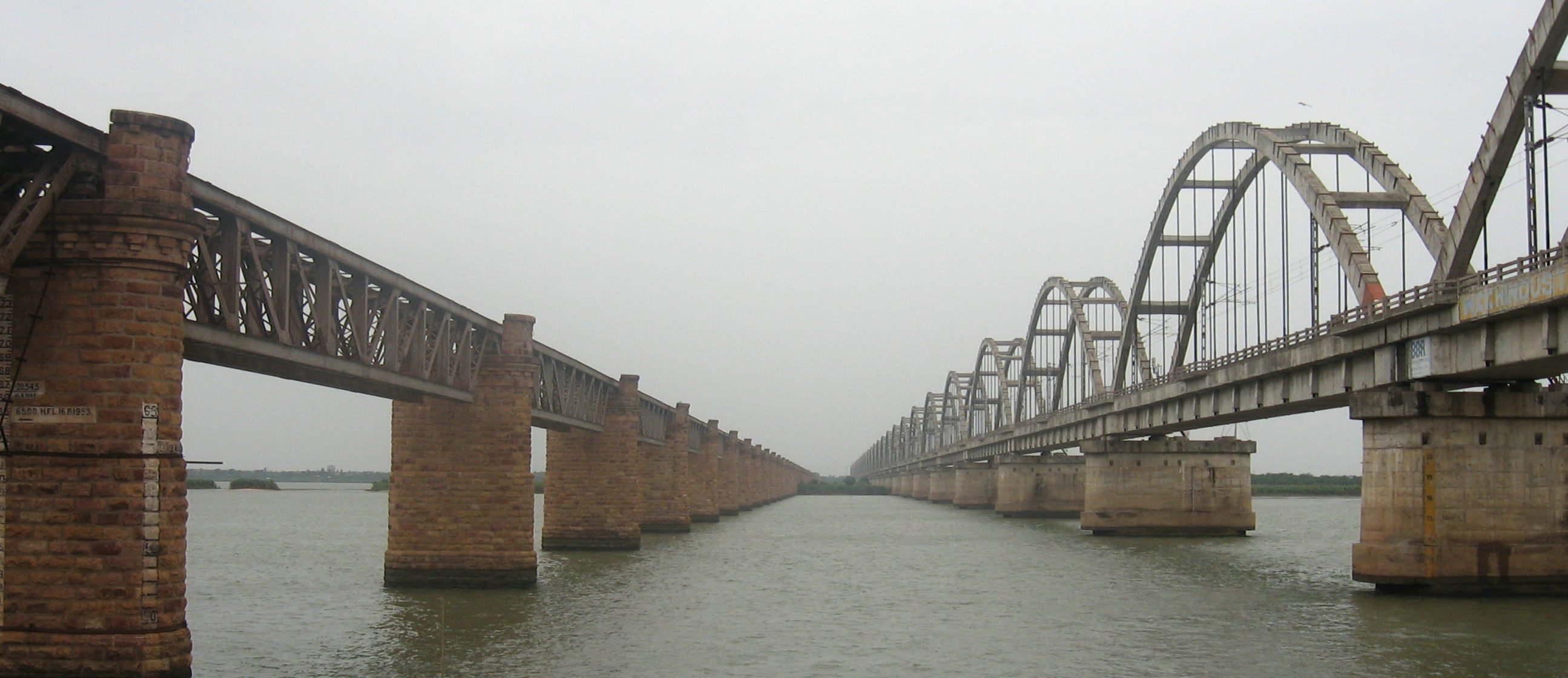
Godavari Arch Bridge in Rajahmundry.

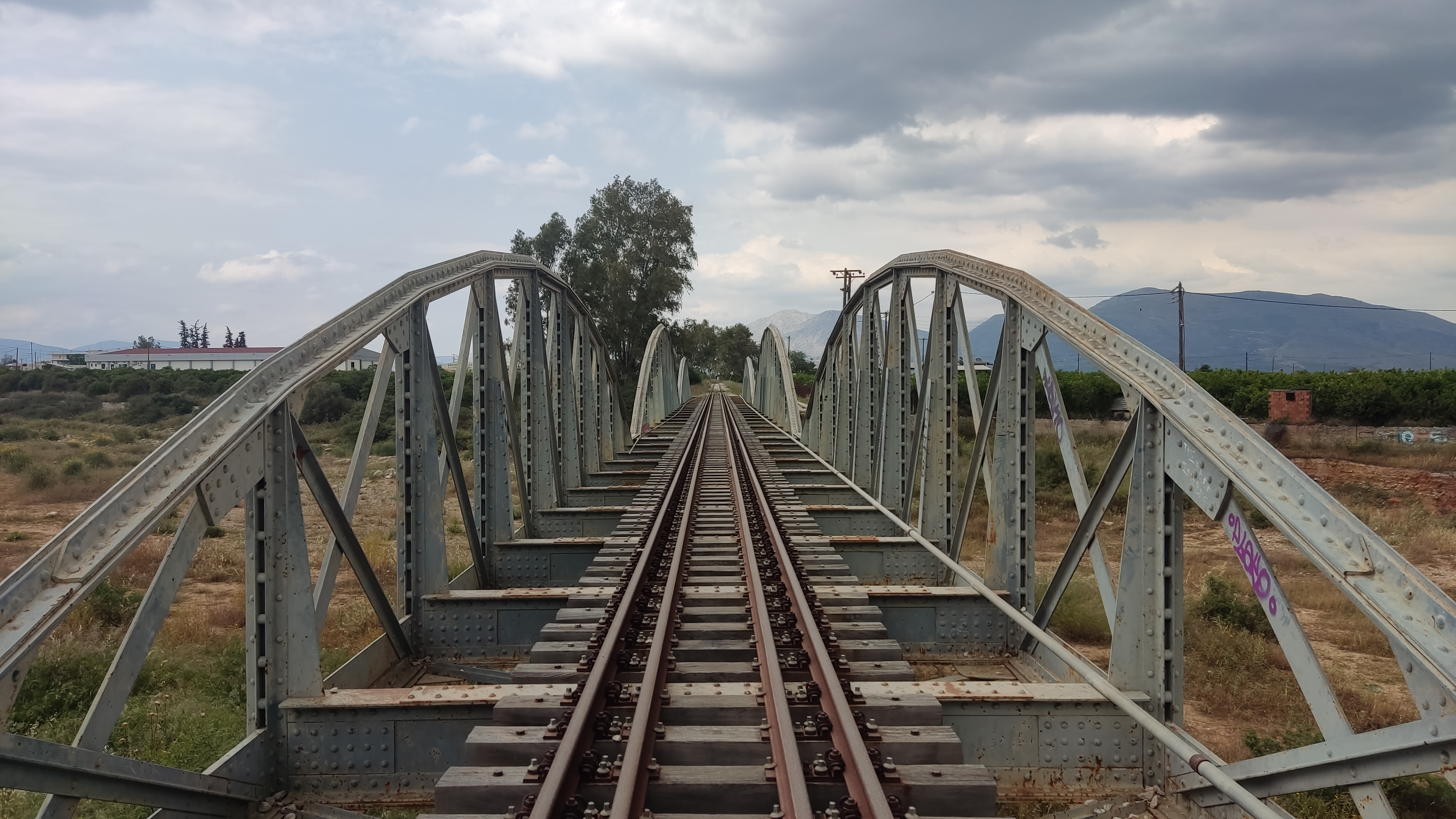
A rail bridge in Argos, Peloponnese, featuring multiple tied arches.

Tied arch bridges may consist of successively lined up tied arches in places where a single span is not sufficient. An example for this is the Godavari Arch Bridge in Rajahmundry, India. It has four separate supports on each pier and carries the South Central Railway Line of India. It was designed for 250 km/h rail services.

=== Multi-span continuous tied-arch ===
Dashengguan Bridge in Nanjing (lateral view diagram)

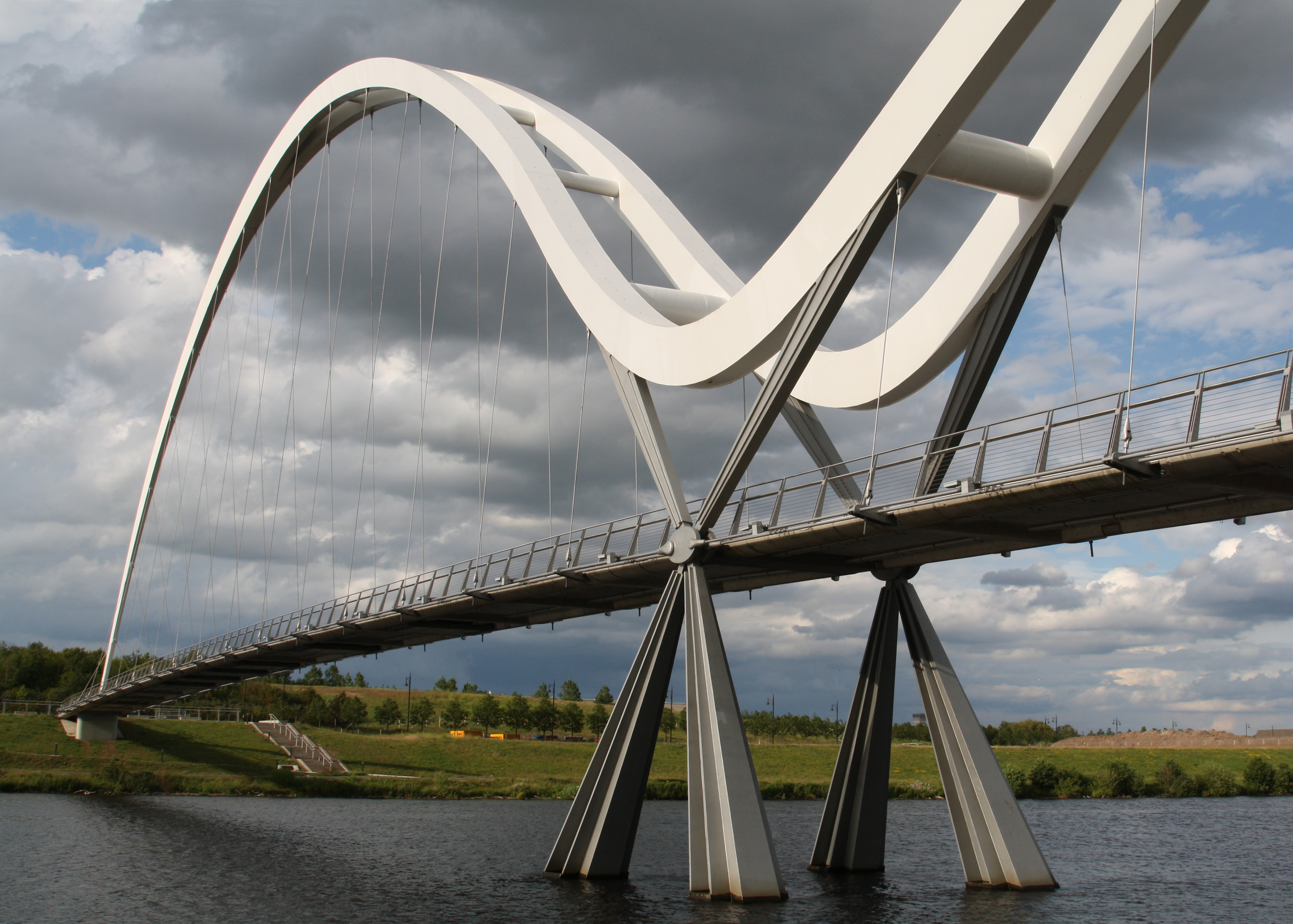
The Infinity Bridge in Stockton-on-Tees lines up two asymmetrically sized tied arches.

Like for multi-span continuous beam bridges the tying chord continually spans over all piers. The arches feet coincide (fuse) at the bridge piers. A good visual indication are shared supports at the piers. Dynamic loads are distributed between spans.

This type may be combined with the shouldered tied-arch design discussed above. An example for this is Dashengguan Bridge in Nanjing, China. Its two main arches are shouldered by short auxiliary arches. It is both, a (rigid) tied-arch and a cantilevered trussed arch design. Because the traffic runs through the structural envelope, it is also a through arch bridge. Guandu Bridge in New Taipei, Taiwan is a non-trussed example with three main arches augmented by two auxiliary arch segments at the bridge portals.

The Infinity Bridge uses two arches of different height and span length that both bifurcate before their apex. Above its single, middle-displaced river pier the deck lies between the arches. Contrarily each abutment on the riverbanks supports a single arch end only, in the middle of the deck. The tying chord(s) consist of a composite deck structure. Four post tensioned coil steel cables, two to each side of the walking deck, are locked in place by orthogonally run steel beams every 7.5 meters. The hangers are joined to each of these beams between each cable pair. Since the beams extend the width of the post-tensioned concrete deck, the tensing cable pairs remain visible.

A close-up of the river pier shows that the structural dead load is tied per span: The larger arch span uses thicker tensing cables and the reflex segments are not suspended from, but supported by steel beams, essentially completing the arches at the river pier. However, for dynamic and non-uniform loads the visually defining arch continuations must not be neglected.

=== Single tied-arch per span ===
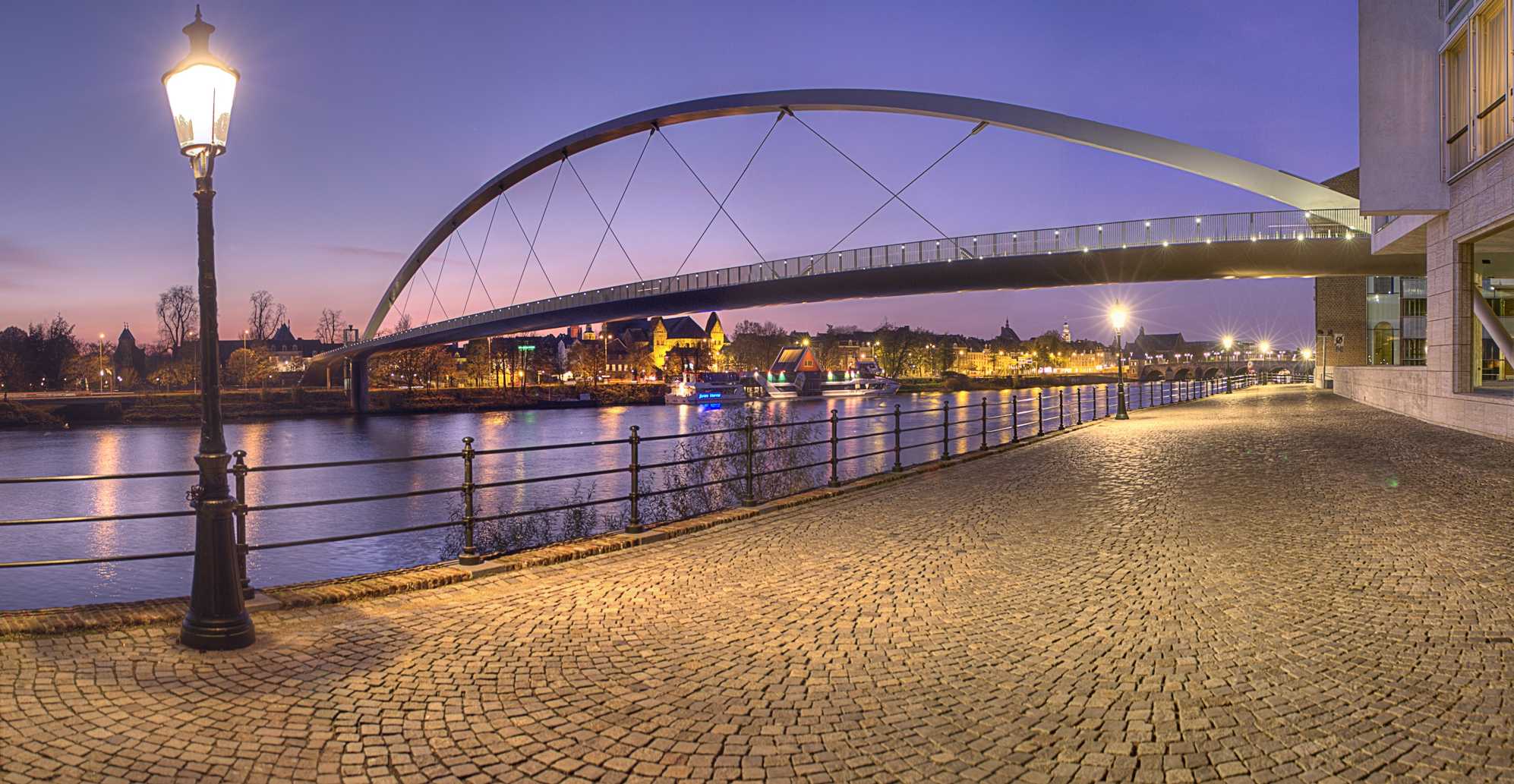
Hoge Brug (or Passerelle Céramique) in Maastricht.

Usually, for a single span, two tied-arches are placed in parallel alongside the deck, so the deck lies in between the arches. Axial tied-arch or single tied-arch bridges have at most one tied-arch per span that is usually centered in the middle of the bridge deck. An example for this is Hoge Brug in Maastricht. Since it has hinged hangers it might also classify as a Nielsen bridge who held a patent on tied-arch bridges with hinged hangers from 1926.

=== Tilted tied-arch ===
Some designs tilt the arches outward or inward with respect to the axis running along the bridge deck.

=== Tied-arch twin ===
In analogy to twin bridges, two tied arch bridges erected side by side to increase traffic capacity, but structurally independent, may be referred to by tied arch twin bridges. Each in return may use a single- or multi-span, discrete or continuous tied-arch design.

== Differentiation ==
A bowstring truss bridge is similar in appearance to a tied-arch; however, the bowstring truss behaves as truss, not an arch. The visual distinction is a tied-arch bridge will not have substantial diagonal members between the vertical members.

== Issues ==
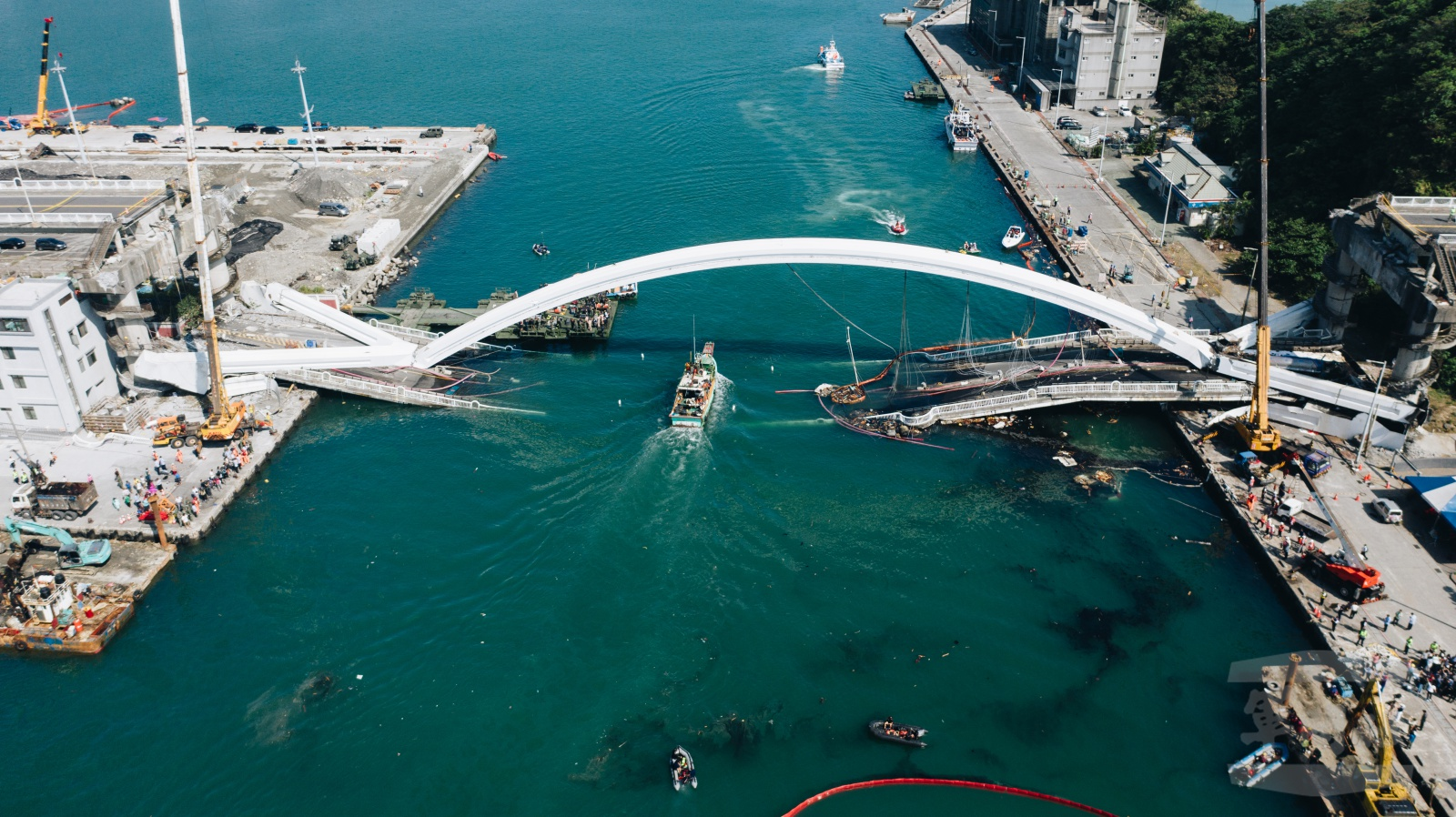
The collapsed Nanfang'ao Bridge in Yilan County, Taiwan, Republic of China.

In a 1978 advisory issued by the Federal Highway Administration (FHWA), the FHWA noted that tied-arch bridges are susceptible to problems caused by poor welds at the connection between the arch rib and the tie girders, and at the connection between the arch and vertical ties. In addition, problems with electroslag welds, while not isolated to tied-arch bridges, resulted in costly, time-consuming and inconveniencing repairs. The structure as a whole was described as nonredundant: failure of either of the two tie girders would result in failure of the entire structure.

== See also ==
- Through arch bridge
- James Barney Marsh

== Gallery of tied-arch bridges ==
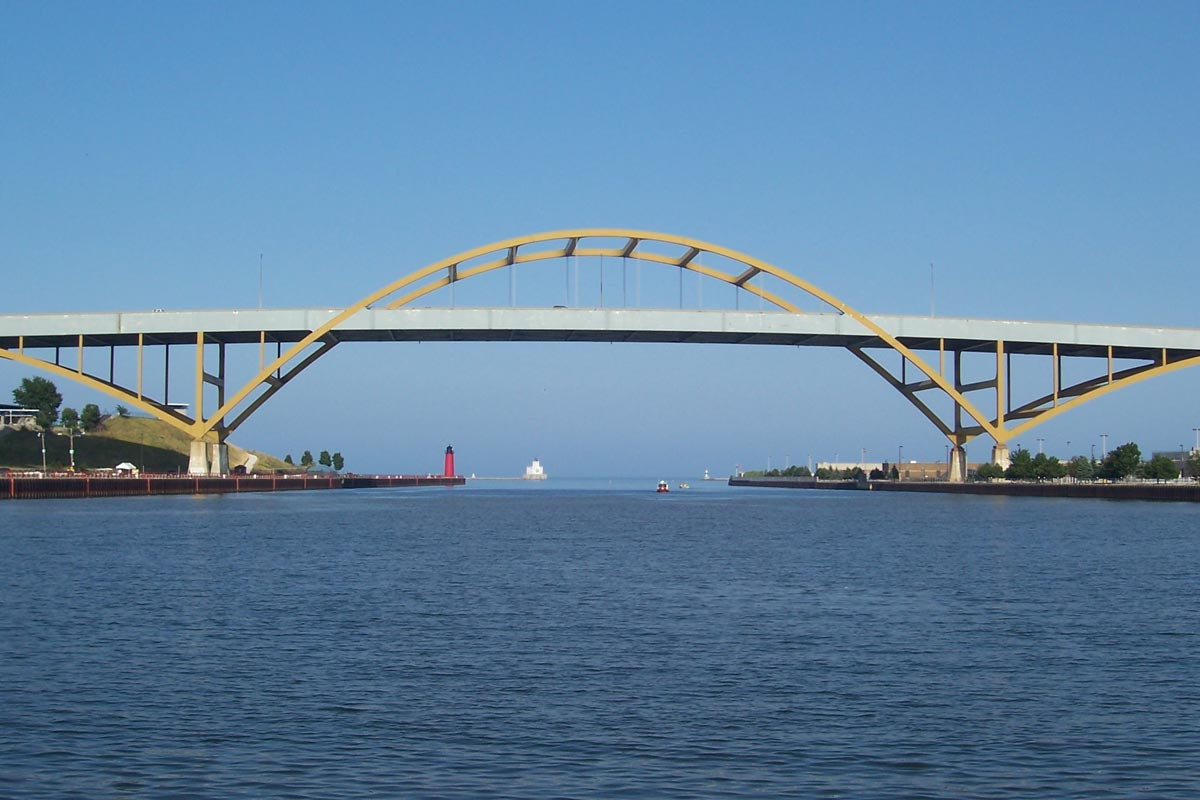
The Hoan Bridge is a tied-arch bridge, carrying Interstate 794 over the Milwaukee River in Milwaukee, Wisconsin.

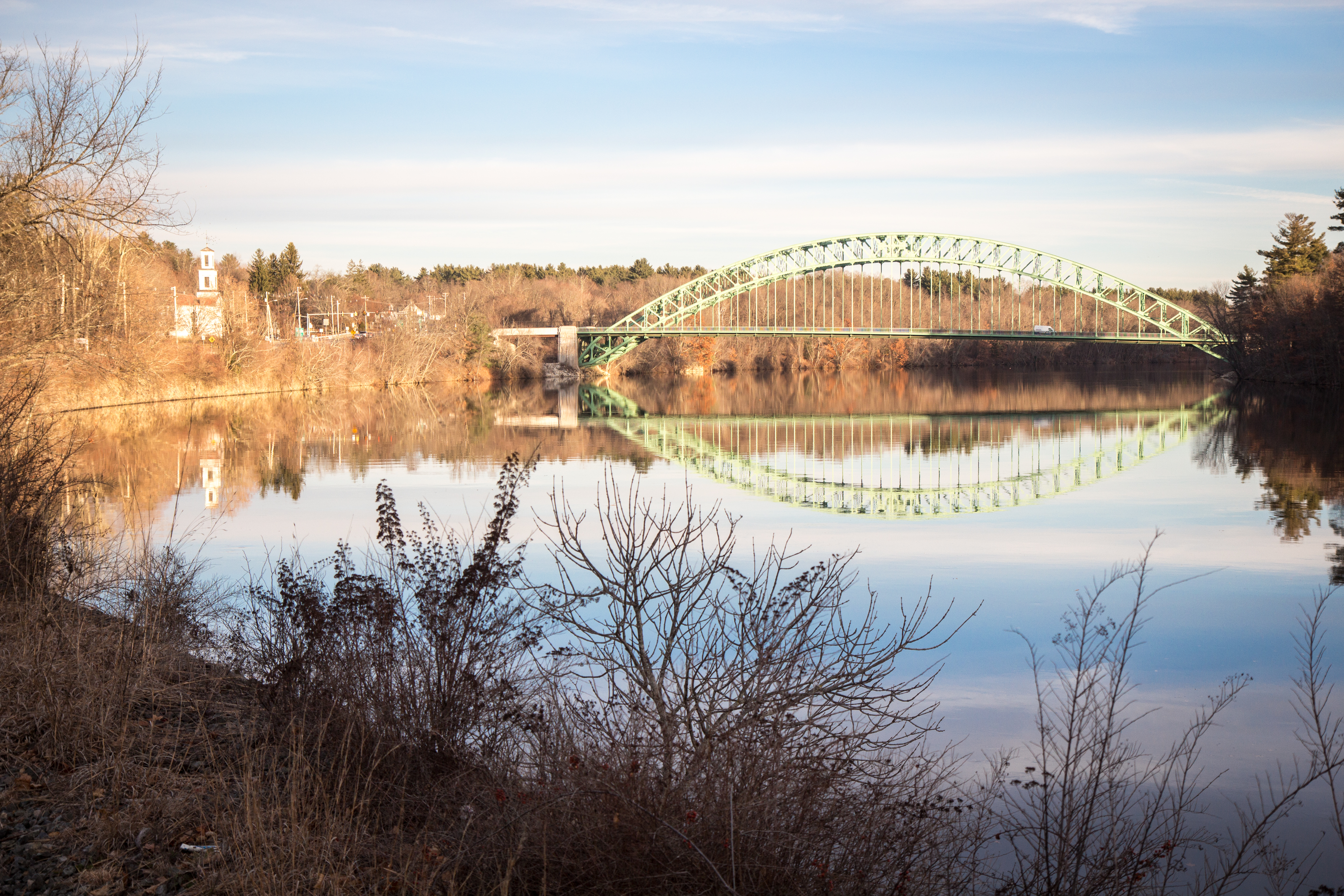
The Tyngsborough Bridge is the longest and second oldest bridge of this type in Massachusetts.

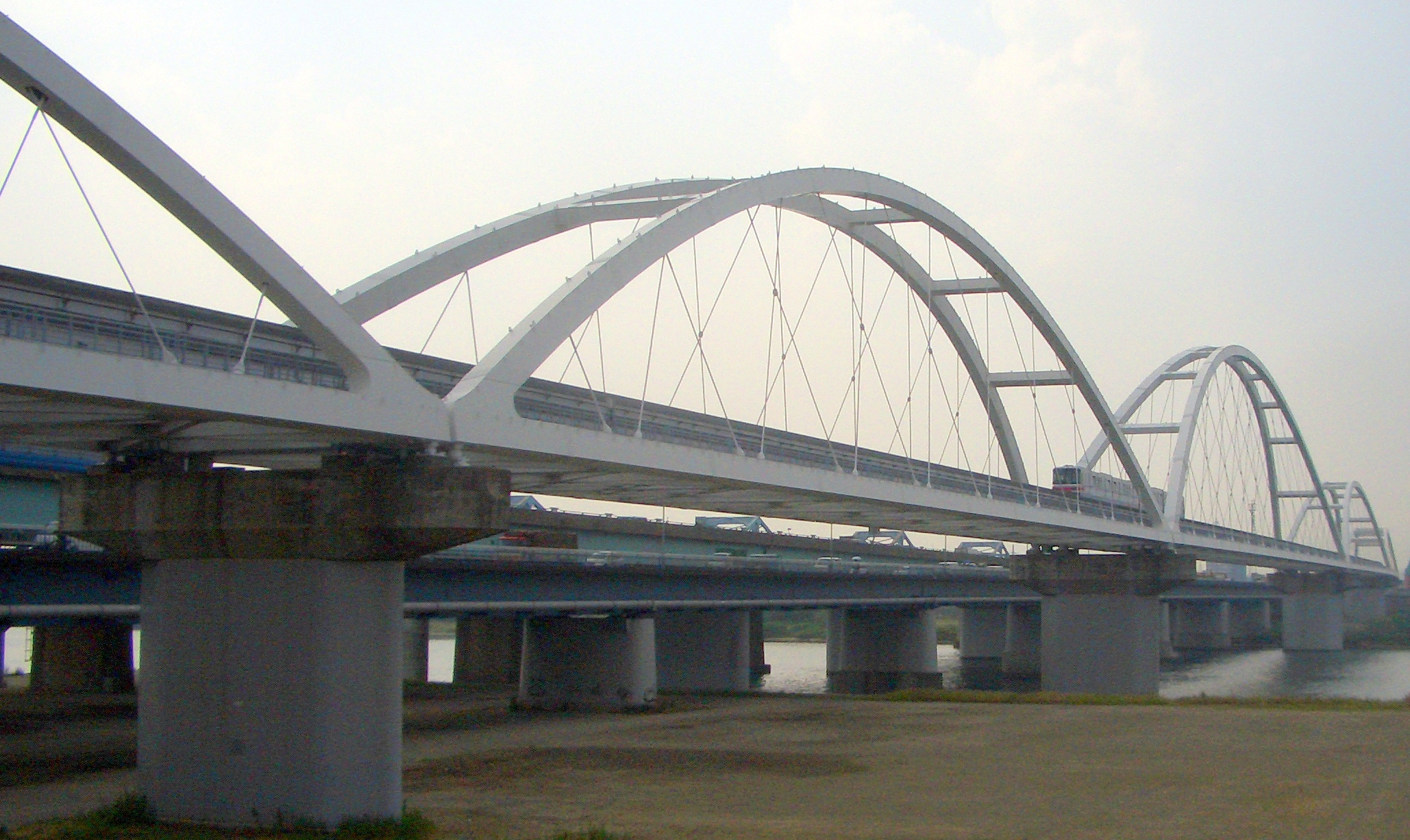
Torikai ohasi (Torikai big bridge) 鳥飼大橋 - over the Yodo river, Osaka, Japan

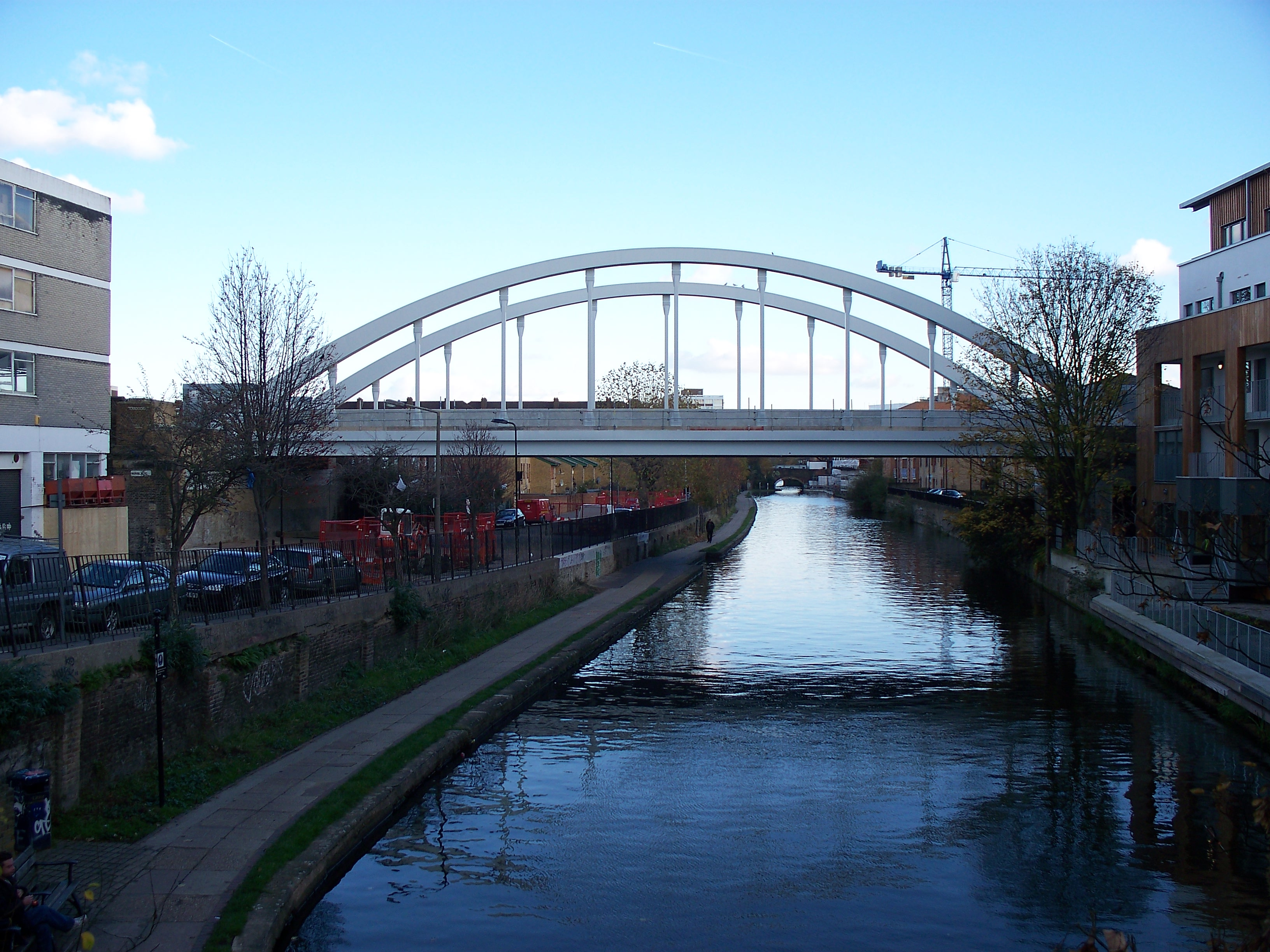
The Haggerston bridge carries the London Overground across the Regent's Canal.

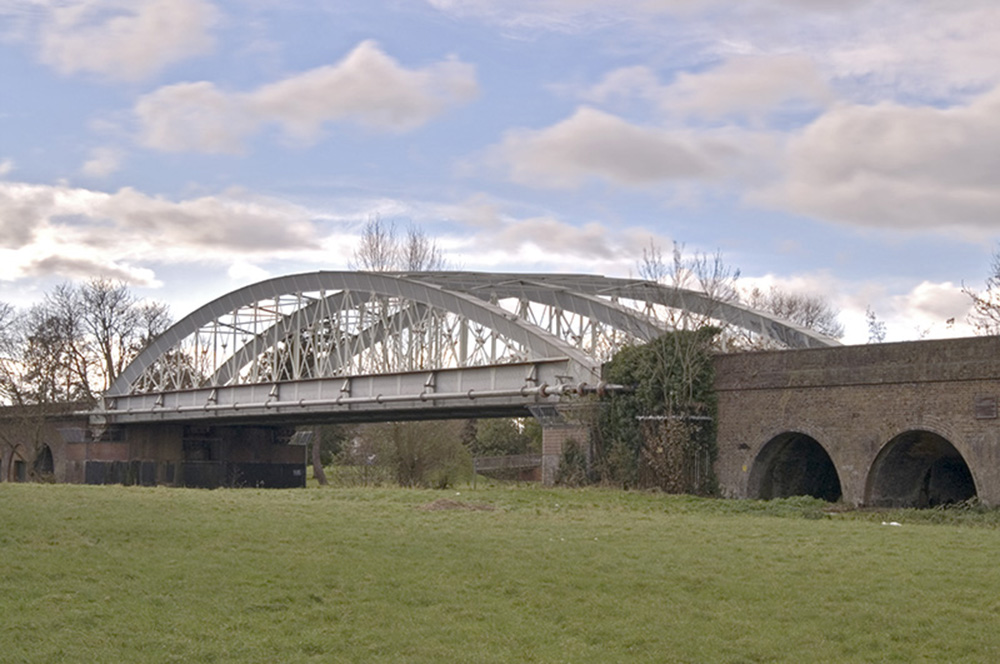
Windsor Railway Bridge designed by Brunel and built in 1849.

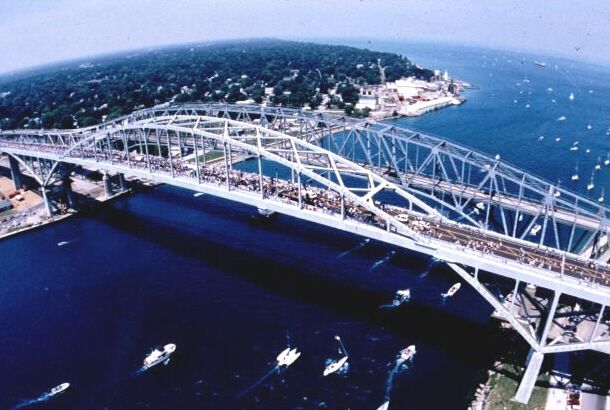
The Blue Water Bridge second span (in foreground) built in 1997.

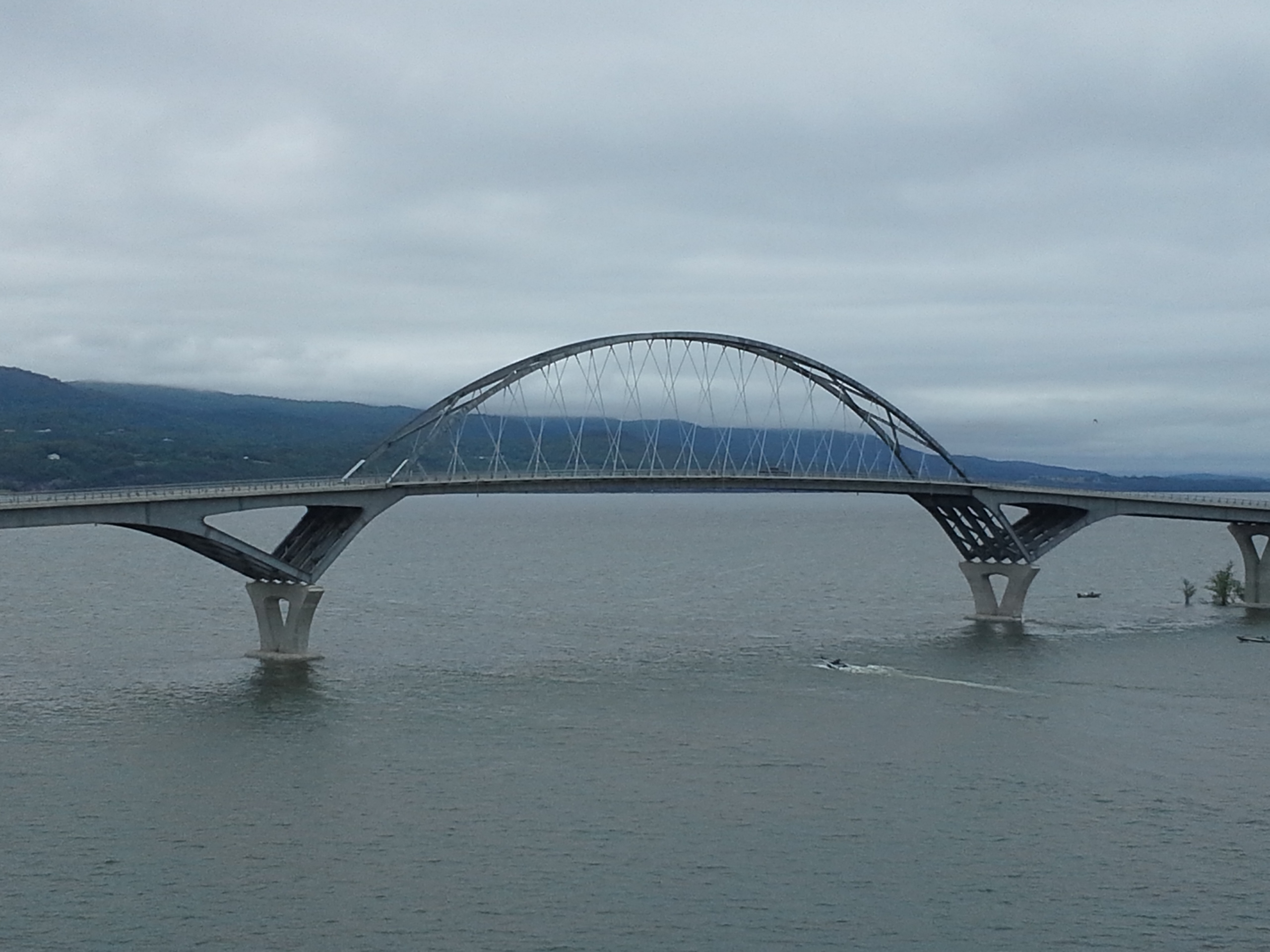
The Lake Champlain Bridge, a network tied arch.

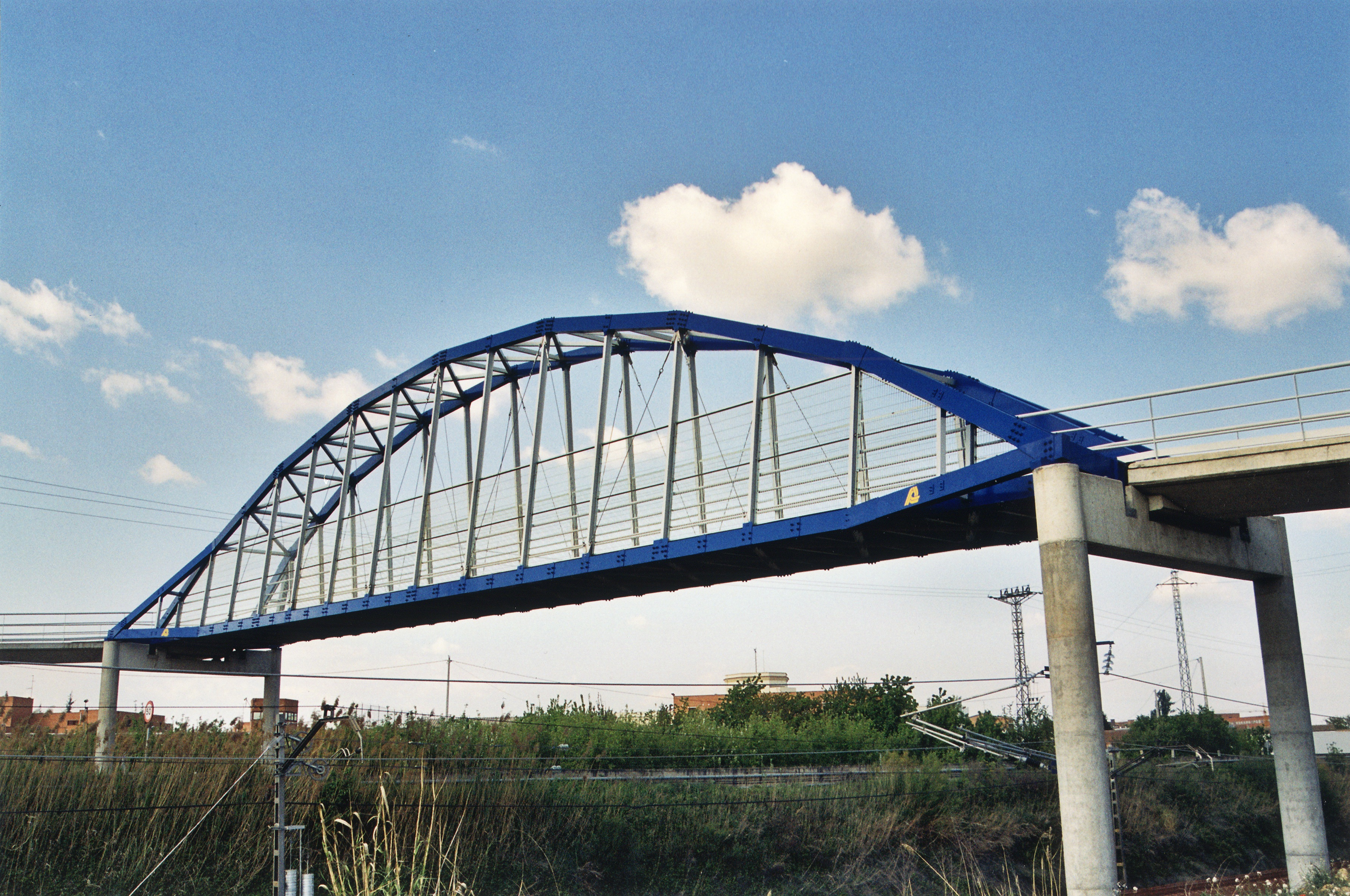
The GFRP Lleida Pedestrian Bridge, the first and longest through arch made up in Fibre-reinforced plastic.

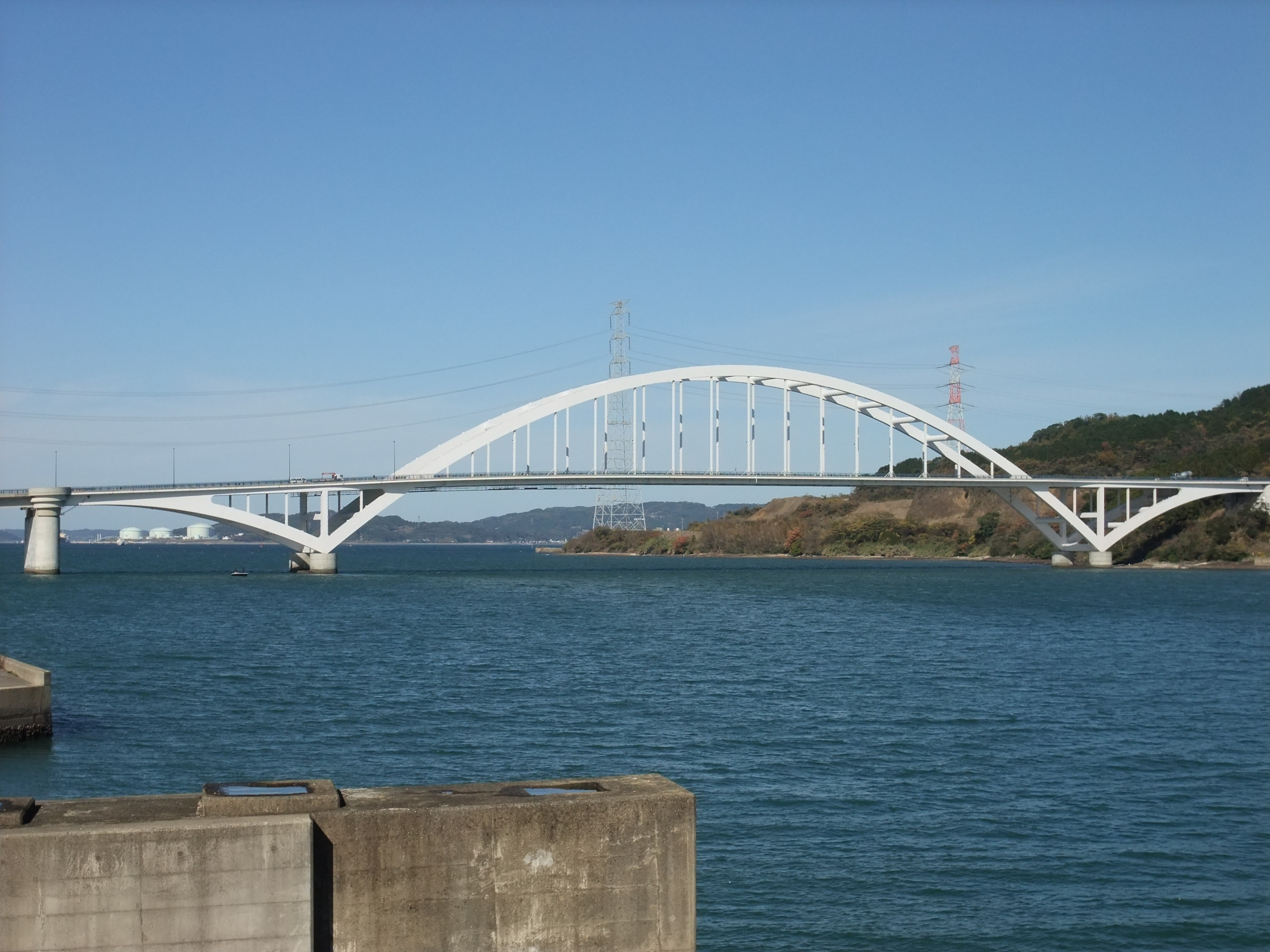
Imari Bay Bridge in Saga prefecture, Japan

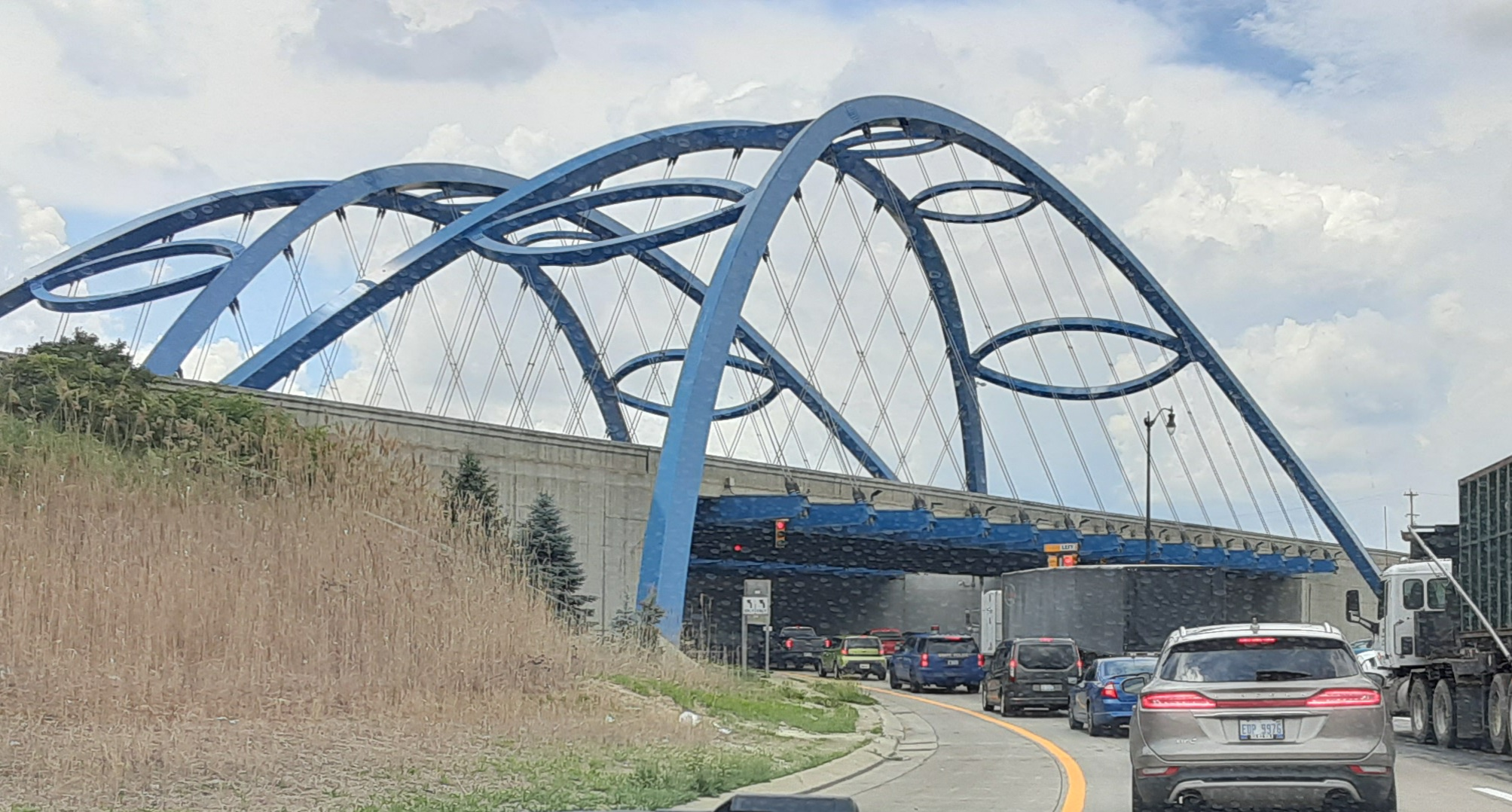
Gateway Bridge in Taylor, Michigan, designed for the preparation for Super Bowl XL, hosted in nearby city of Detroit, built in 2005
