= Erkkilän silta =

Road bridge in Tampere, Finland

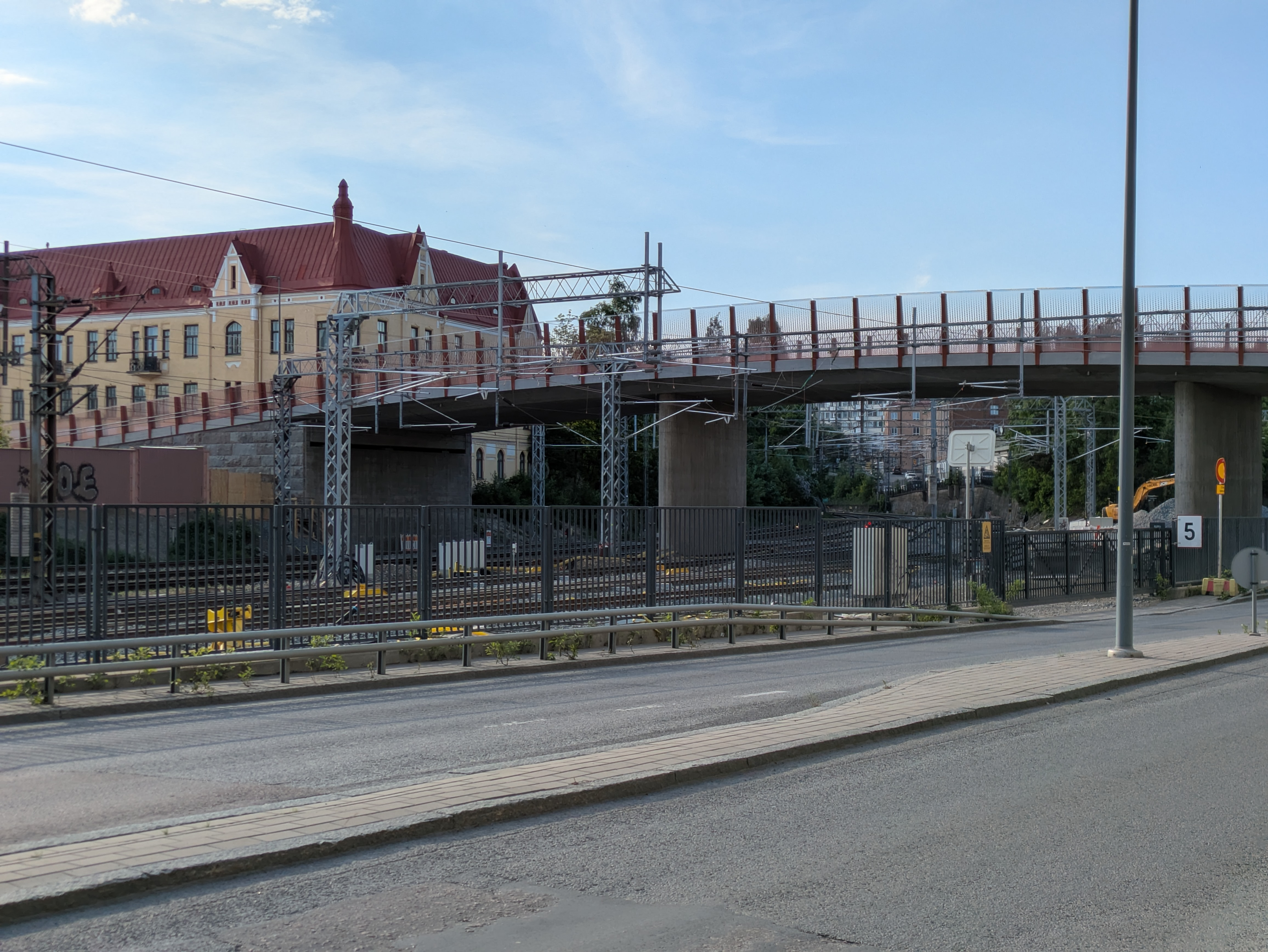
- Erkkilä bridge in June 2026
- Coordinates: 61°30′09.7″N 023°46′23.6″E
- Crosses: Tampere railway yard
- Locale: Tampere, Finland

Characteristics
- Design: Beam bridge
- Material: Reinforced concrete
- Total length: 86 m (282 ft)
- Width: 14 m (46 ft)

History
- Opened: 2026

Location
- Interactive map of Erkkilän silta

Erkkilän silta (the ″Erkkilä Bridge″) is a bridge located in the center of Tampere, Finland. It crosses the railway yard to the north of the Tampere Central Station, connecting the Jussinkylä and Tammela districts.

The current bridge was completed in the spring of 2026. It is an 86-metre long and 14-metre wide post-tensioned continuous concrete slab bridge. The structure was replaced as part of the Tampere Passenger Rail Yard Project because the vertical clearance of the previous bridge was insufficient for modern railway standards. As part of the project, the connecting street, Erkkilänkatu, was renovated to include dedicated cycle lanes.

== Former bridge ==
The bridge previously located on the site was a type of steel tied-arch bridge, a combination of arch and beam bridge with a span of 42 meters. The stone ground supports of the bridge came from a bridge built in 1963 on the same site. The bridge was completed in 1983.

In connection with the construction of the bridge, another old ground support was reinforced with bored piles. The bridge was renovated in 2005 by, among other things, renewing the waterproofing and coating of the bridge deck and painting the steel arches. The bridge was demolished in April 2025, and its components were transported to Näsisaari for reuse.

== Gallery ==
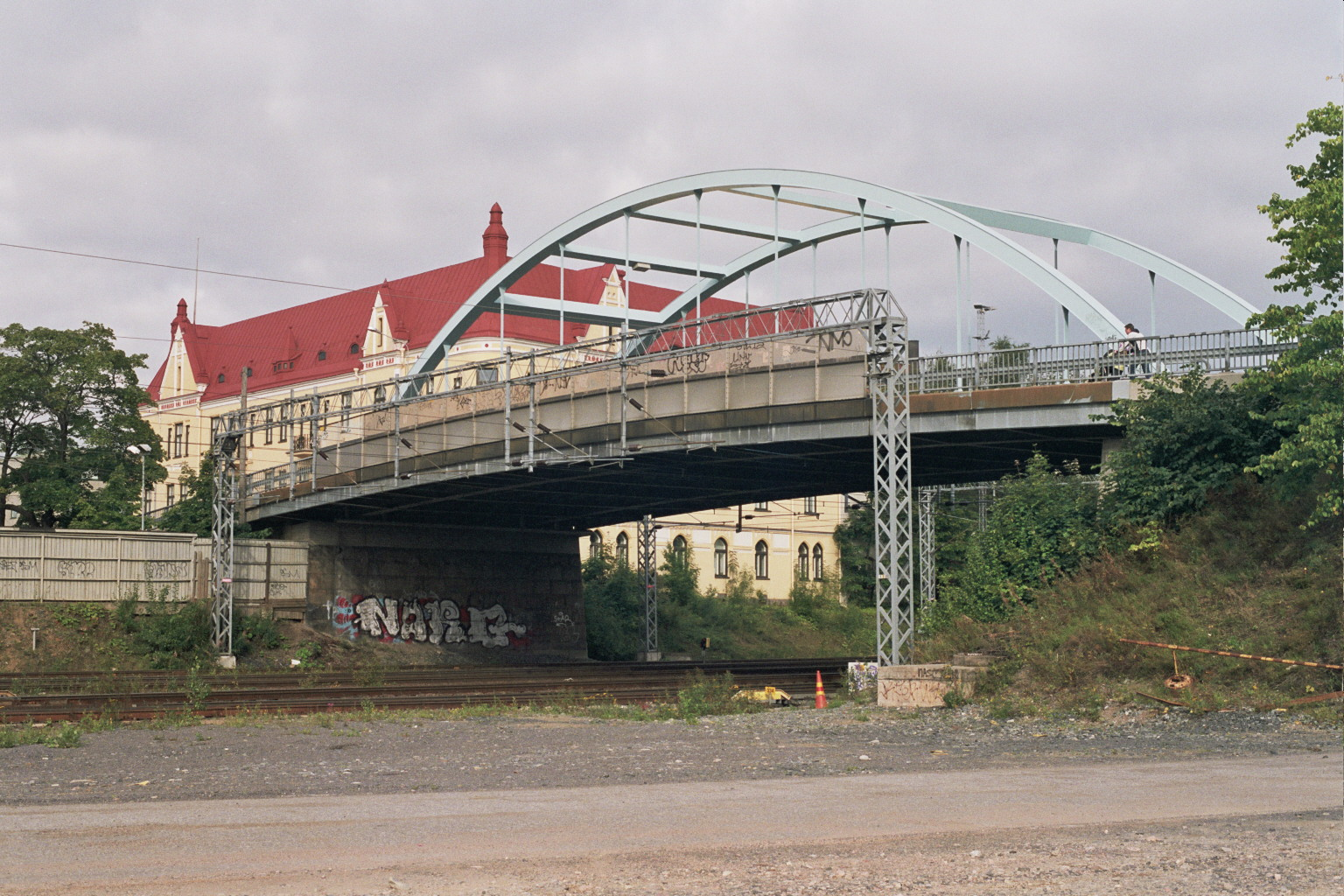
Former Erkkilä bridge in August 2008

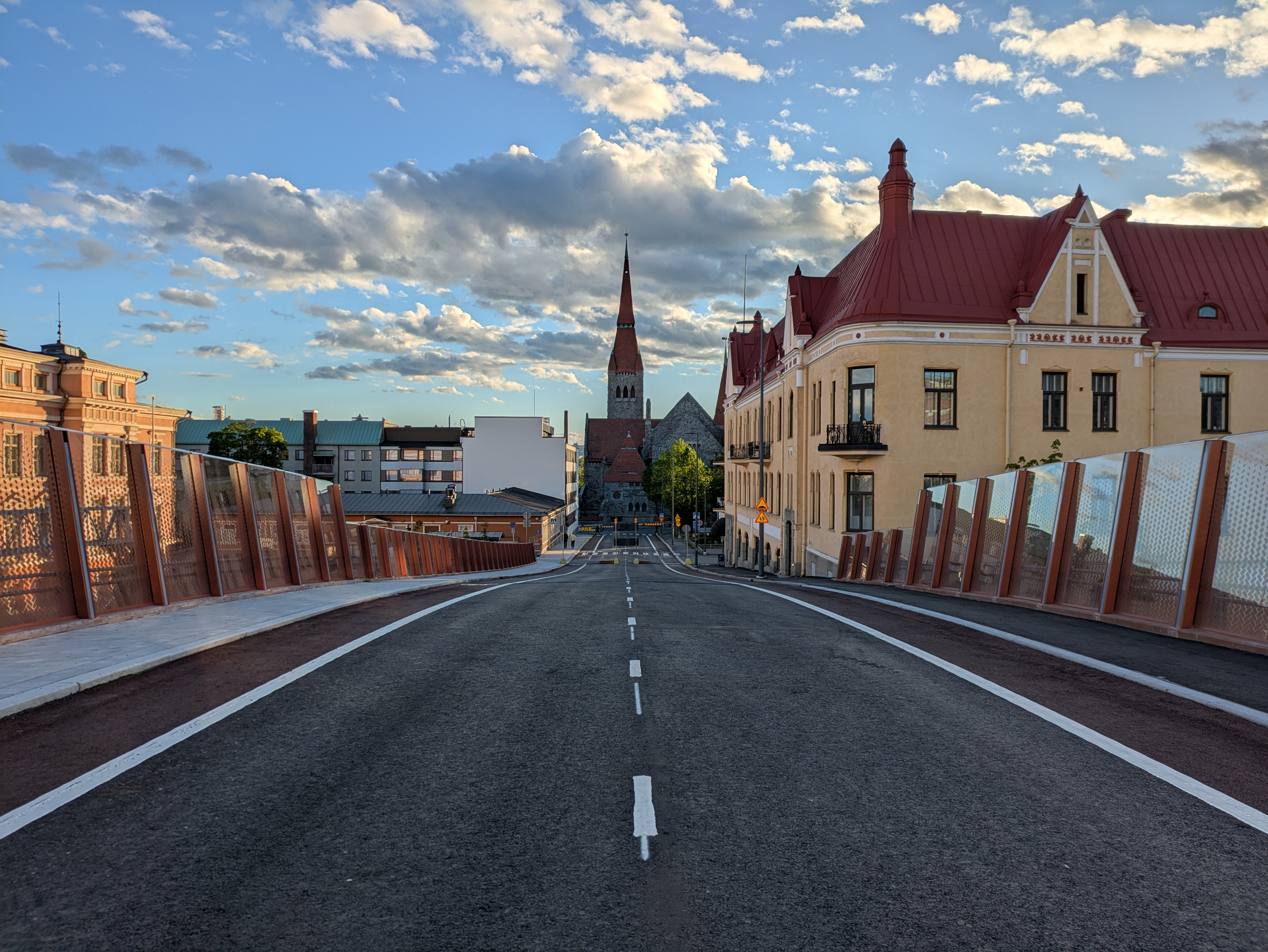
A view from Erkkilä bridge in May 2026
