= Tammerkoski =

Rapids in Tampere, Pirkanmaa, Finland

Coordinates: 61°29′53″N 023°45′50″E

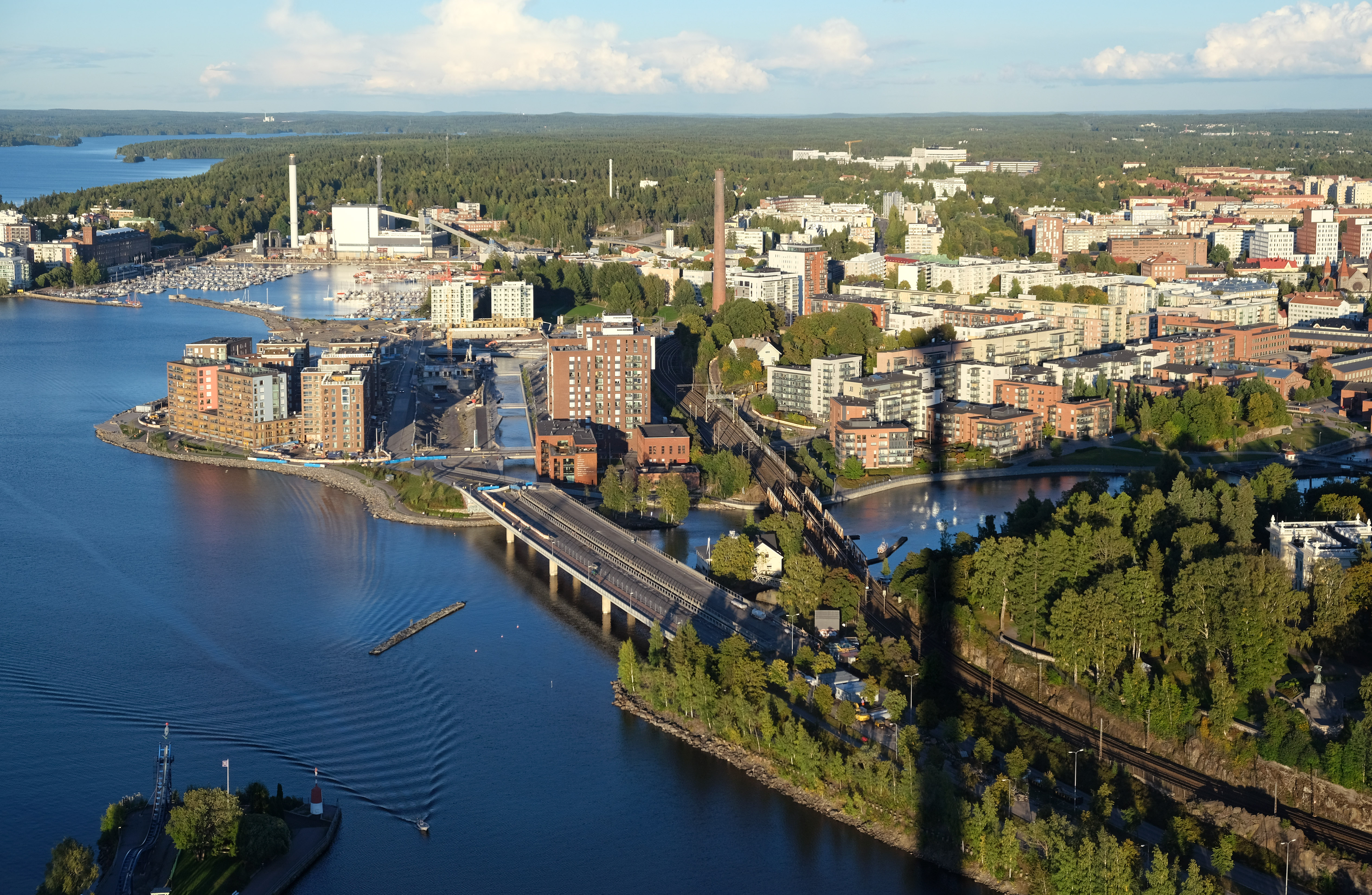
Näsijärvi and Tammerkoski seen from Näsinneula tower

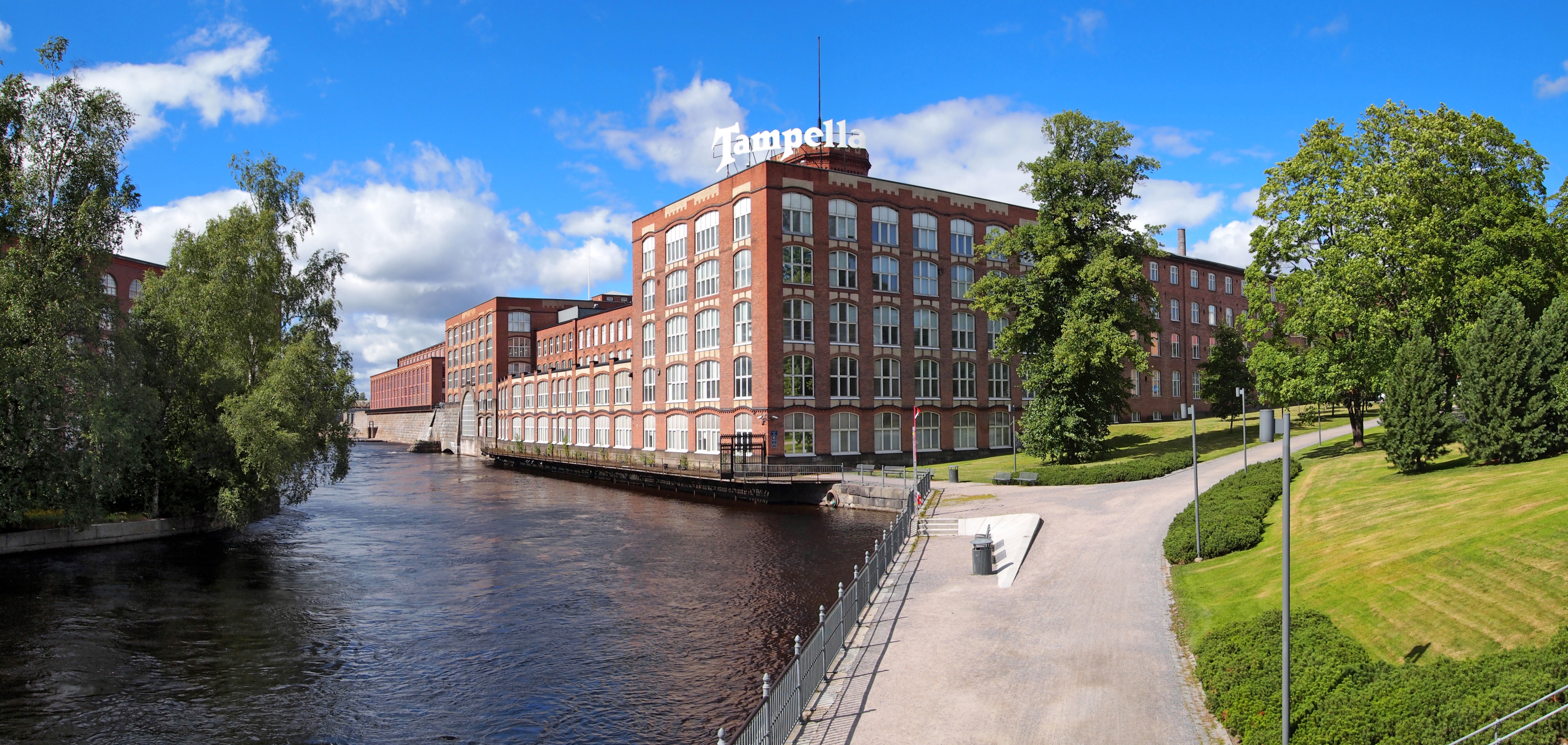
The north part of Tammerkoski. On the left, the former Finlayson textile mill. On the right, the former metal and textile factory Tampella.

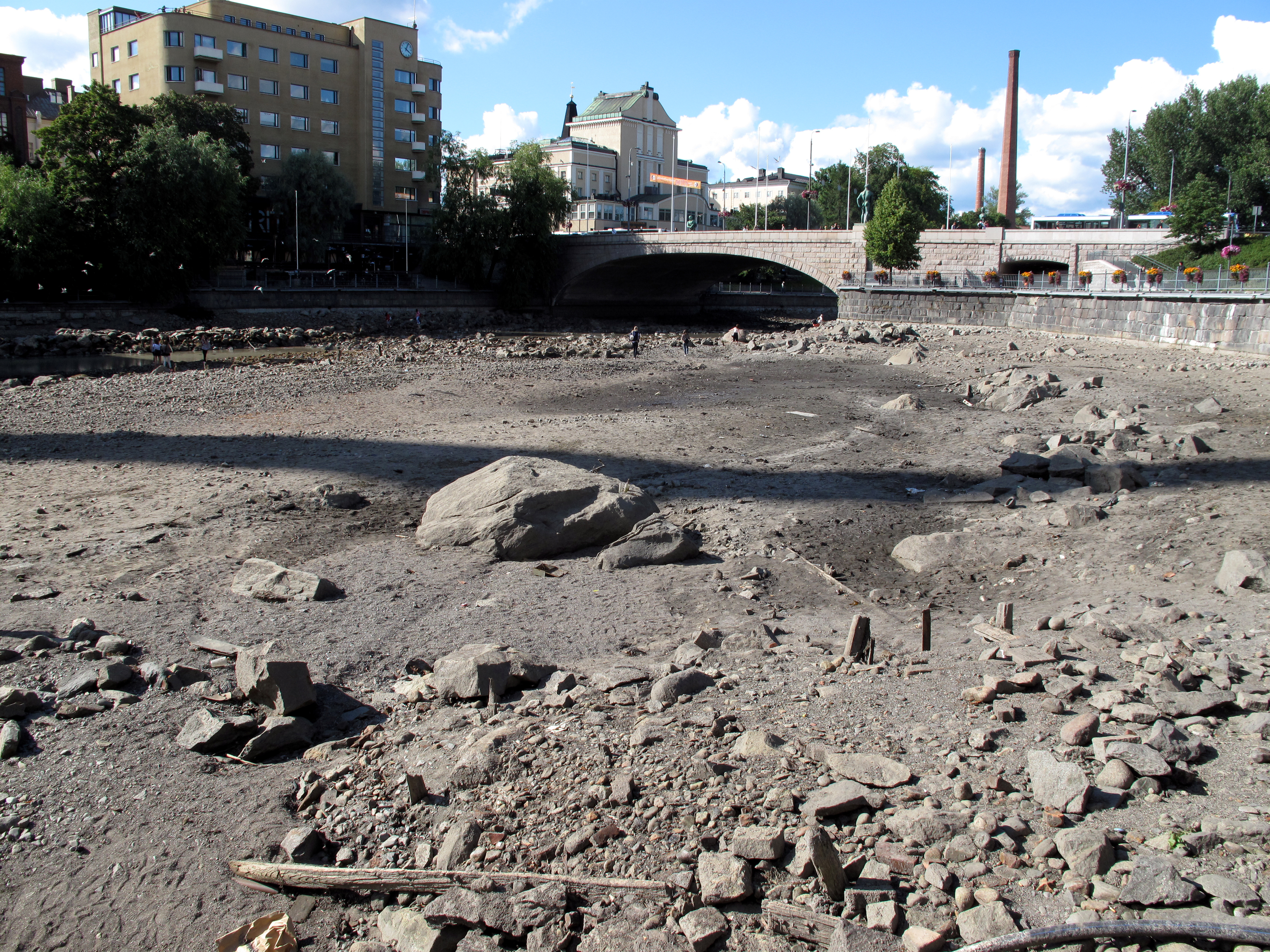
Tammerkoski is drained on rare occasions to maintain the bridges.

Tammerkoski is a channel of rapids in Tampere, Finland. The city of Tampere is located between two lakes, Näsijärvi and Pyhäjärvi. The difference in altitude between these two is 18 metres (59 ft) and the water flows from Näsijärvi to Pyhäjärvi through the Tammerkoski rapids. The banks of the Tammerkoski are among the oldest industrial areas in Finland and were the site of a busy marketplace in the 17th century. Tampere was founded on the banks of the rapids, as the rushing water provided a great deal of power for the needs of industry.

Four power stations and three dams are located on the Tammerkoski. The highest in altitude is the dam between Finlayson and Tampella. From this dam, the stream is led to the power stations of Finlayson and Tampella on either side of the rapids. In the middle is the city's power plant and the lowest one in terms of altitude is the dam at the Tako paperboard mill, owned by M-real. The three uppermost power stations are owned by the city, while the power station at Tako is owned mostly by the municipal power company of Southern Savonia.

== History ==
Tammerkoski has been mentioned in official documents since 1405. In the 15th century, the first dams were built on the channel. The first argument over milling plant rights happened in 1466, when Takahuhti, Messukylä and Tammerkoski argued over their shares. About a hundred years later the government noticed the possibilities in the area and tried to replace the peasant-controlled dams with their own. The attempt was unsuccessful due to opposition from the inhabitants.

In the 17th century, a popular and well-known marketplace was established in the Tammerkoski area. The permanent marketplace remained near the Tammerkosken kartano (Tammerkoski manor), west of the bridge over the channel. At the beginning of the 18th century, the main marketplace was moved to Harju.

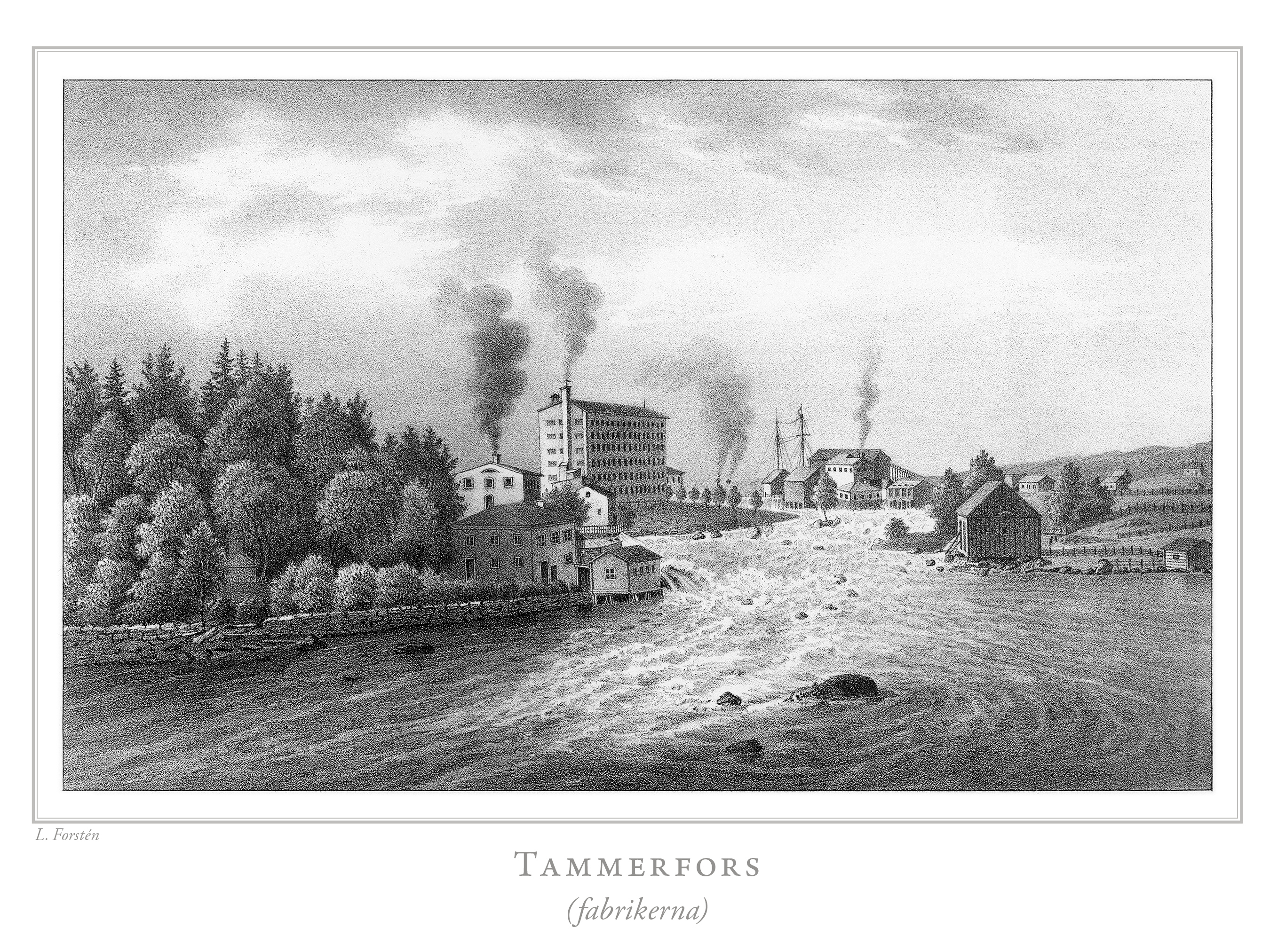
Tammerkoski illustrated in Finland framställdt i teckningar (1845-1852)

In 1775, King Gustav III of Sweden travelled to Finland and signed the charter of foundation for Tammerkoski, a city later renamed to Tampere. A wooden bridge over the Tammerkoski was constructed in 1807. This was later replaced by an iron bridge in 1884 and an iron-concrete bridge named Hämeensilta in 1929. For motor vehicle use, many other bridges have since been built. These include Ratinan silta, Satakunnansilta and Paasikivensilta. For light traffic use, there are Ratinan suvannon silta and Patosilta. There is also a two-track railroad bridge.

By the beginning of the 1990s, most industry had disappeared from the banks of the Tammerkoski. The Tako paperboard mill is the only major industrial installation still operational in the area, producing mainly high-quality packaging products for luxury items such as French perfume. The buildings of the old factories have been turned into restaurants and museums among other uses. The waters of the Tammerkoski are rather unpolluted, belonging to the quality class II in the classification of the Finnish environmental authority and the channel is popular with fishermen.
