= Finlayson industrial area =

Former factory in Tampere, Finland

Coordinates: 61°30′4.79″N 23°45′33.08″E

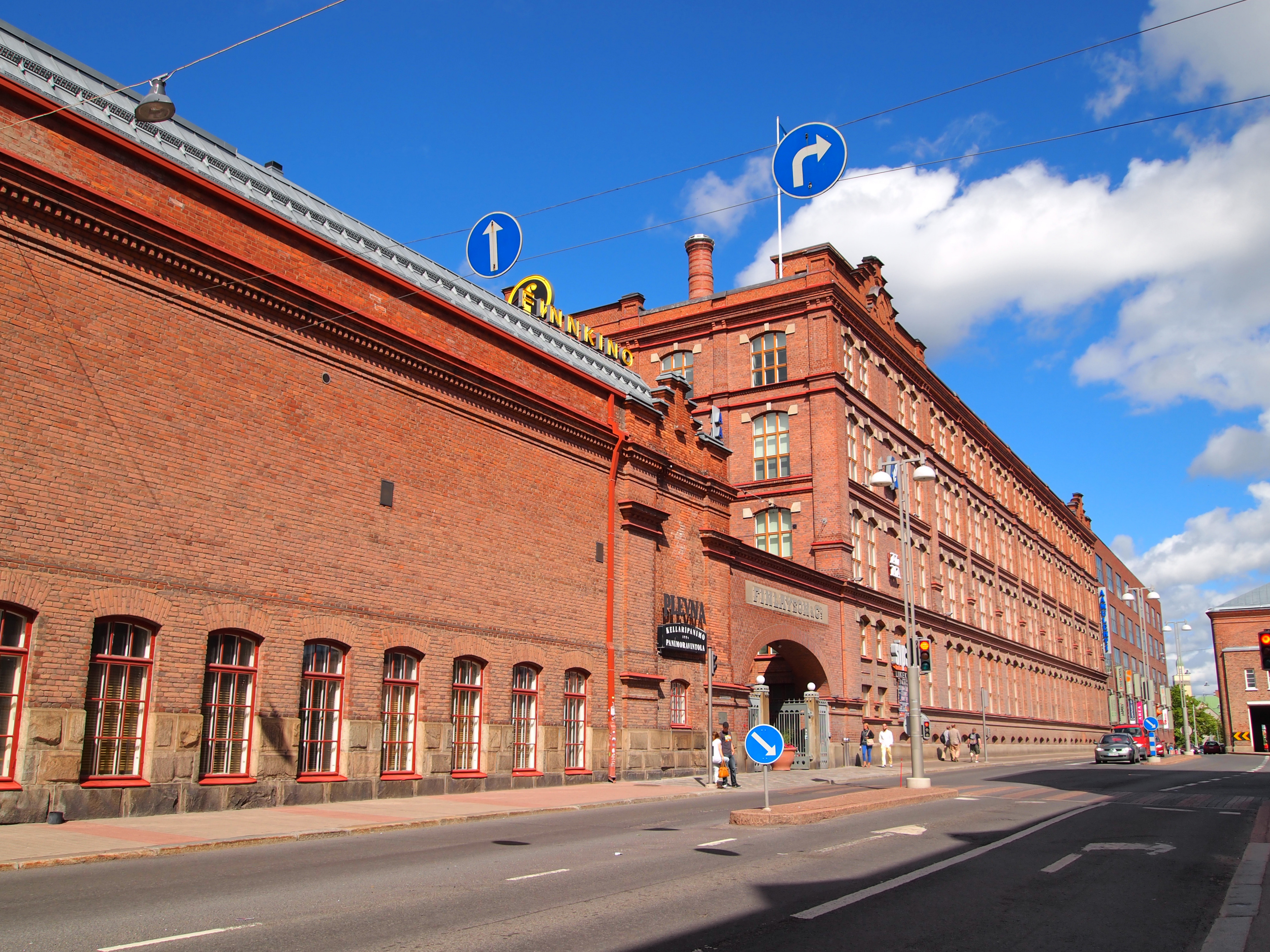
The Finlayson factory gate.

The Finlayson industrial area (Finnish: Finlaysonin tehdasalue) is a historic industrial area in the centre of Tampere, Finland. It is located in the Finlayson district to the west of the Tammerkoski rapids, north of the Satakunnankatu street. Opposite the area to the east of Tammerkoski is the Tampella former industrial area. Neither of the areas remain in industrial use today, but many of the old industrial buildings remain in their place.

The Finlayson factory was founded in 1820 by Scottish industrialist James Finlayson. He commissioned a factory on the upper reaches of the Tammerkoski rapids. None of the original buildings commissioned by Finlayson remain to this day. Finlayson sold the factory to Carl Samuel Nottbeck and Georg Adolf Rauch in 1836. The new owners started to expand the factory.

Nowadays the area is owned by the Varma Mutual Pension Insurance Company.

== Kuusvooninkinen ==
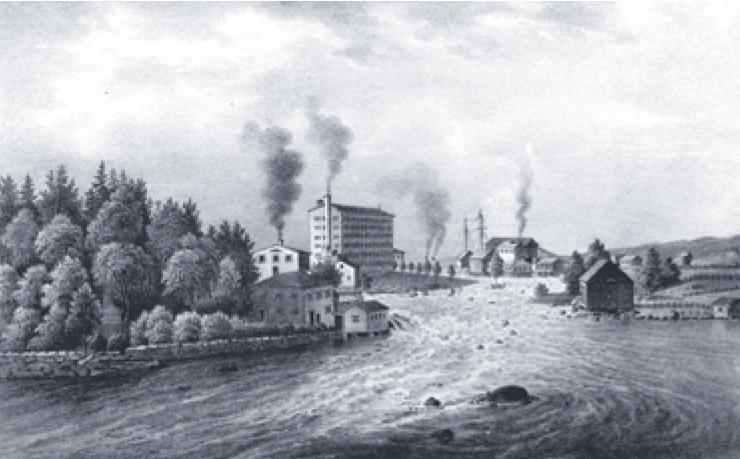
In 1847 the Kuusvooninkinen building dominated the landscape of Tammerkoski.

The oldest building is TR 1 (industrial building 1), also known as Kuusivooninkinen and also referred to as the Old factory. John Barker, specialising in modern industrial construction, took part in its design. The name Kuusivooninkinen comes from the building's six floors ("kuusi", Finnish for "six" and "våning", Swedish for "floor"), with the floors supported by cast iron pillars constructed by the Fiskars ironworks. At the time of its construction it was a veritable skyscraper compared to the buildings around it. The Kuusvooninkinen building was completed in 1837. The machinery for spinning were ready by the next year. Spinning started in the building in 1839.

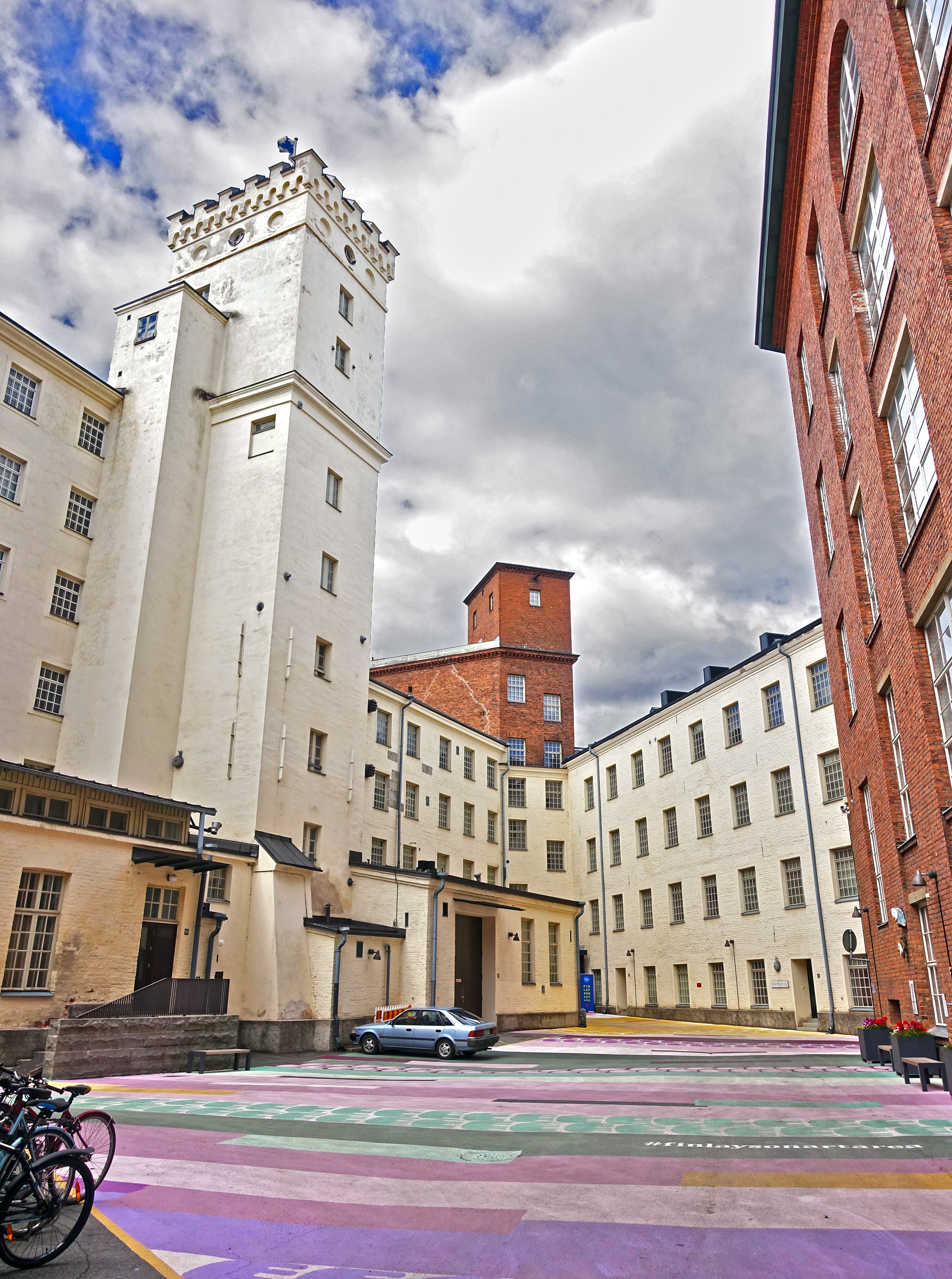
Kuusvooninkinen.

The Kuusivooninkinen building was Finland's first modern industrial building. This is based on its supporting structure, which was built with cast iron pillars instead of intermediary walls. The building was fitted with fire extinguishing equipment. In 1892 this was replaced with an automatic firefighting system. At the time the tower serving as the common stairway for the Kuusvooninkinen building and the adjacent TR 2 factory building was extended so that the water container of the firefighting system could be built high enough.

== Other industrial buildings ==
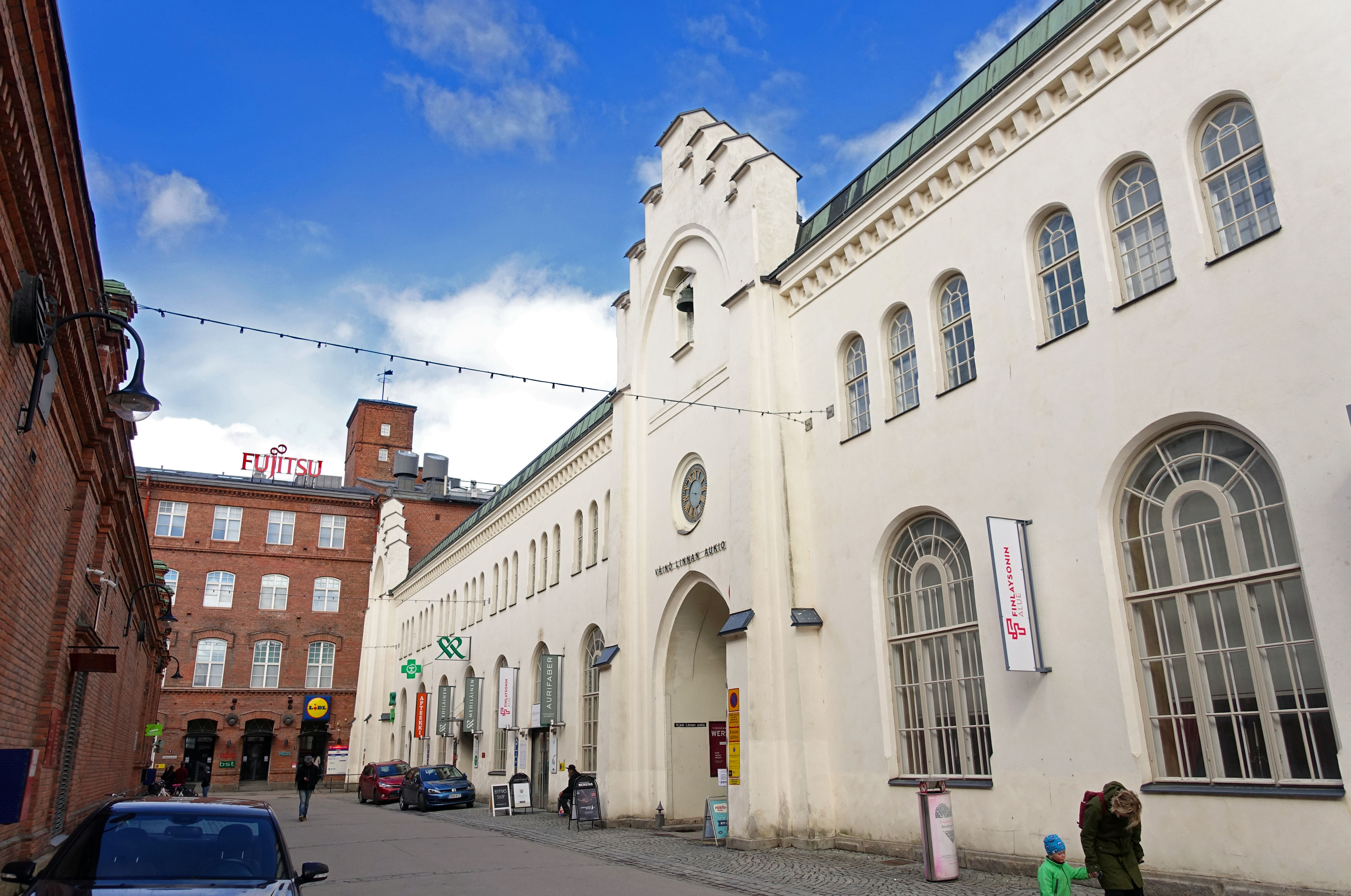
The TR 10 Plevna building on the left, the TR 7 Katuvapriikki building on the right, the TR 31 Puutarhatehdas building in the background.

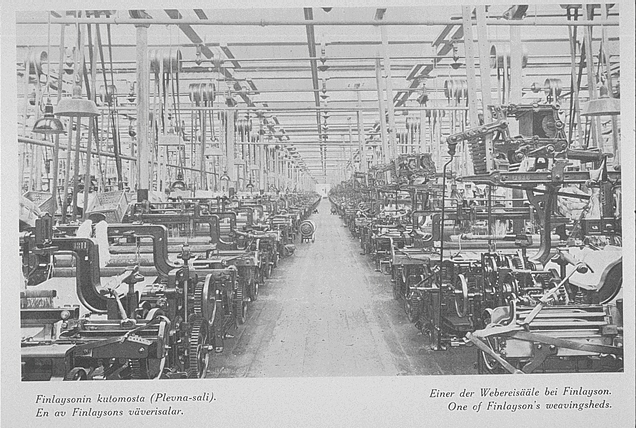
Textile production at the Plevna spinning hall in 1932.

- TR 2
- TR 4 Koskitehdas
- TR 5
- TR 6 dying plant
- TR 7 Katuvapriikki
- TR 9 Seelanti
- TR 10 Plevna
- TR 15 old dying plant (dismantled in 2005)
- TR 22 Eteläturbiini
- TR 31 Puutarhatehdas
- TR 34 head office
- TR 36 steam engine
- TR 37 Siperia
- TR 48 factory shop
- TR 52 power plant
- TR 54 finishing room
- TR 57 Laappihuone (dismantled in 2003)

== Chimney ==
The Finlayson factory chimney was built in 1899 to the Siperia factory building. The chimney is made of brick and is 65 metres high.

== Other buildings and structures ==
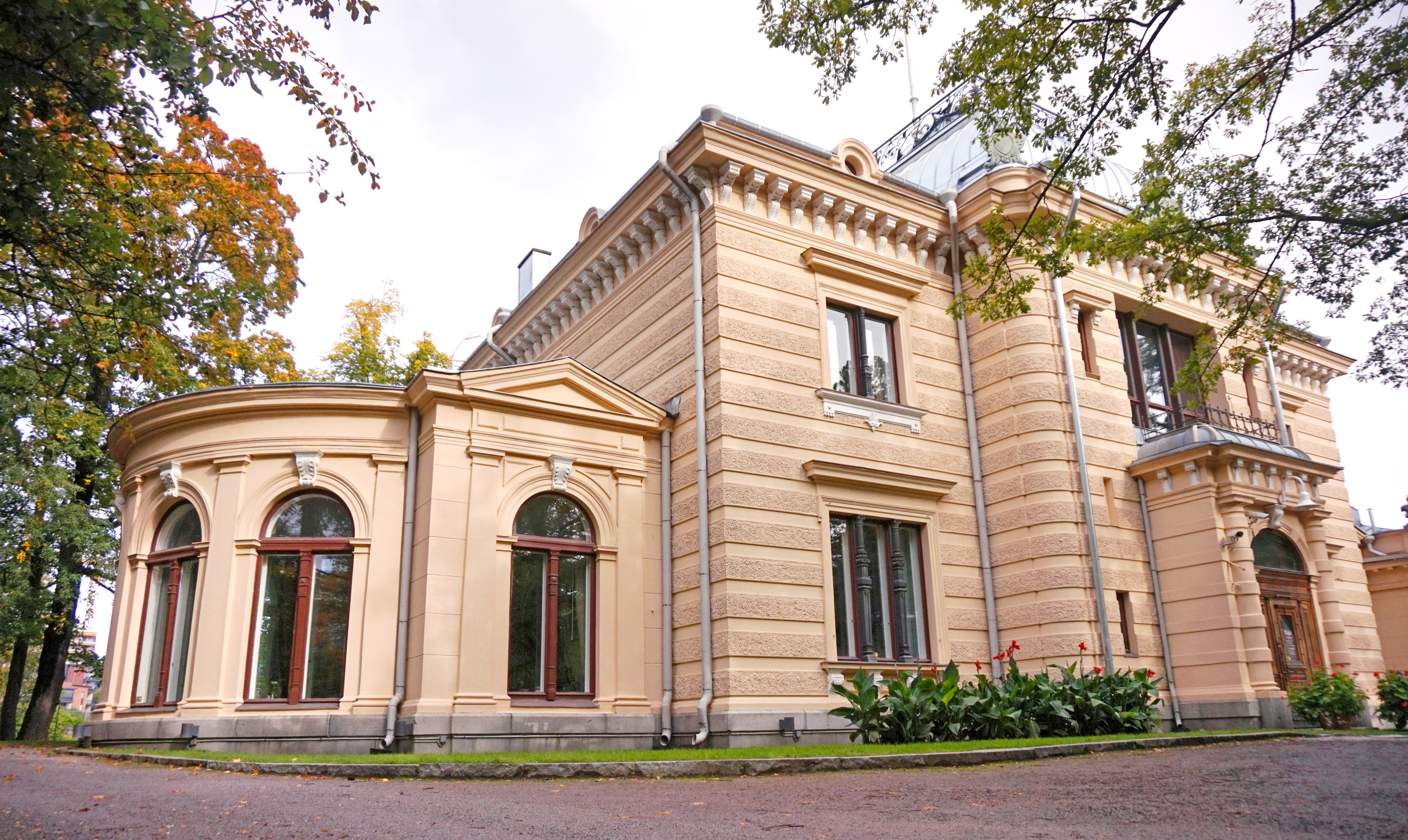
The Finlayson palace.

- Finlayson church
- Finlayson palace
- Finlayson electric track
- Näsilinna
- Tampere garden channel
- Tallipiha
- Tampere first post office

== Current situation ==
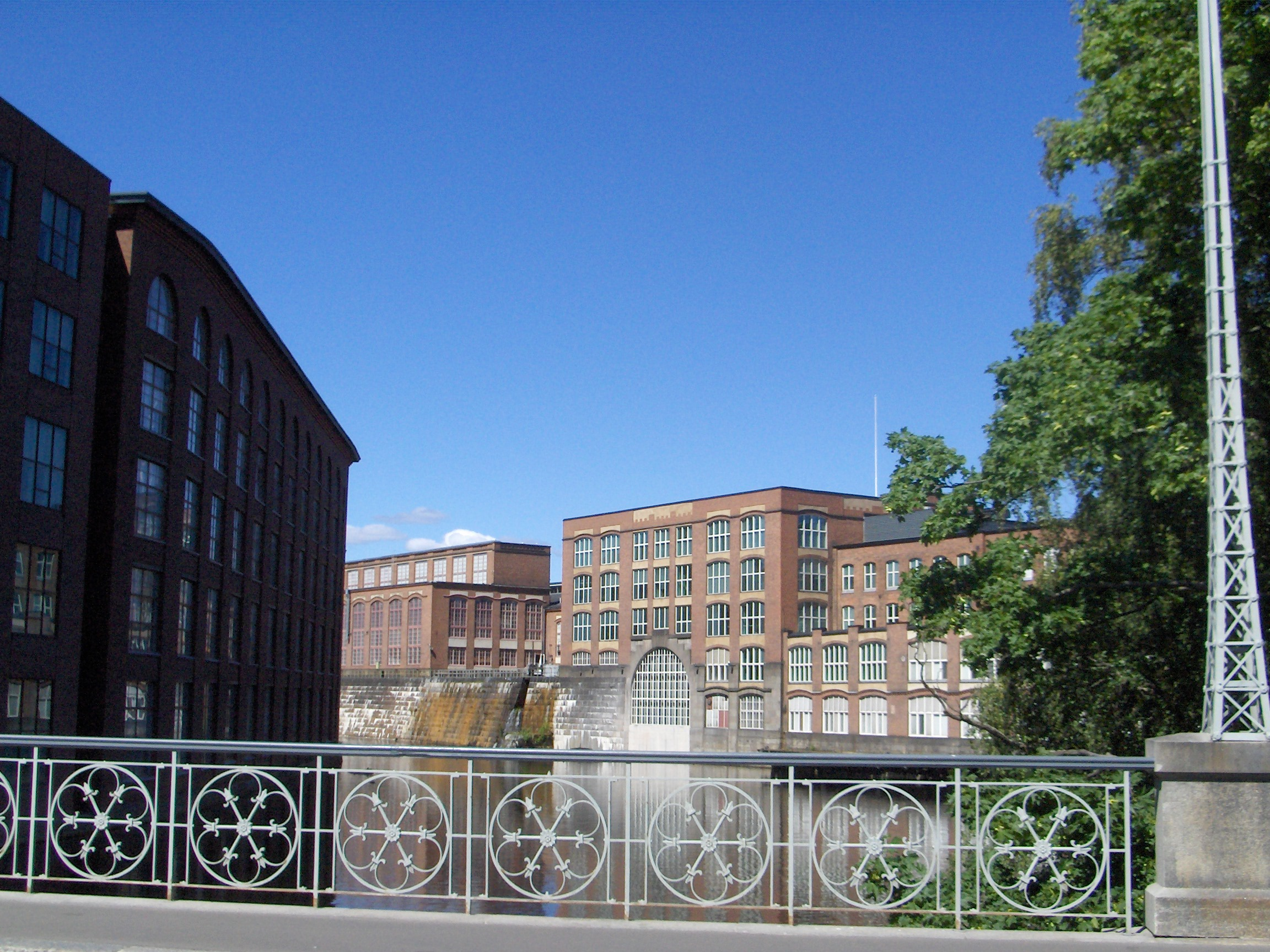
Finlayson and Tamper factories in Tampere.

Finlayson ceased textile production in the area in the early 1990s. Even before that, a design competition of the future of the area was held in 1988, which was won by architect bureau 8 Studio Oy. The new zoning plan of the area was accepted by the city council of Tampere in 1995.

Most of the old buildings in the area have been preserved, but they are no longer in industrial use. The Finlayson outlet store (1923) is still active at Kuninkaankatu 3. The Finlayson area buildings now host other companies, educational institutes and museums. New buildings with a total floor area of 30 thousand square metres have been built in the area, with about 800 people living in them.

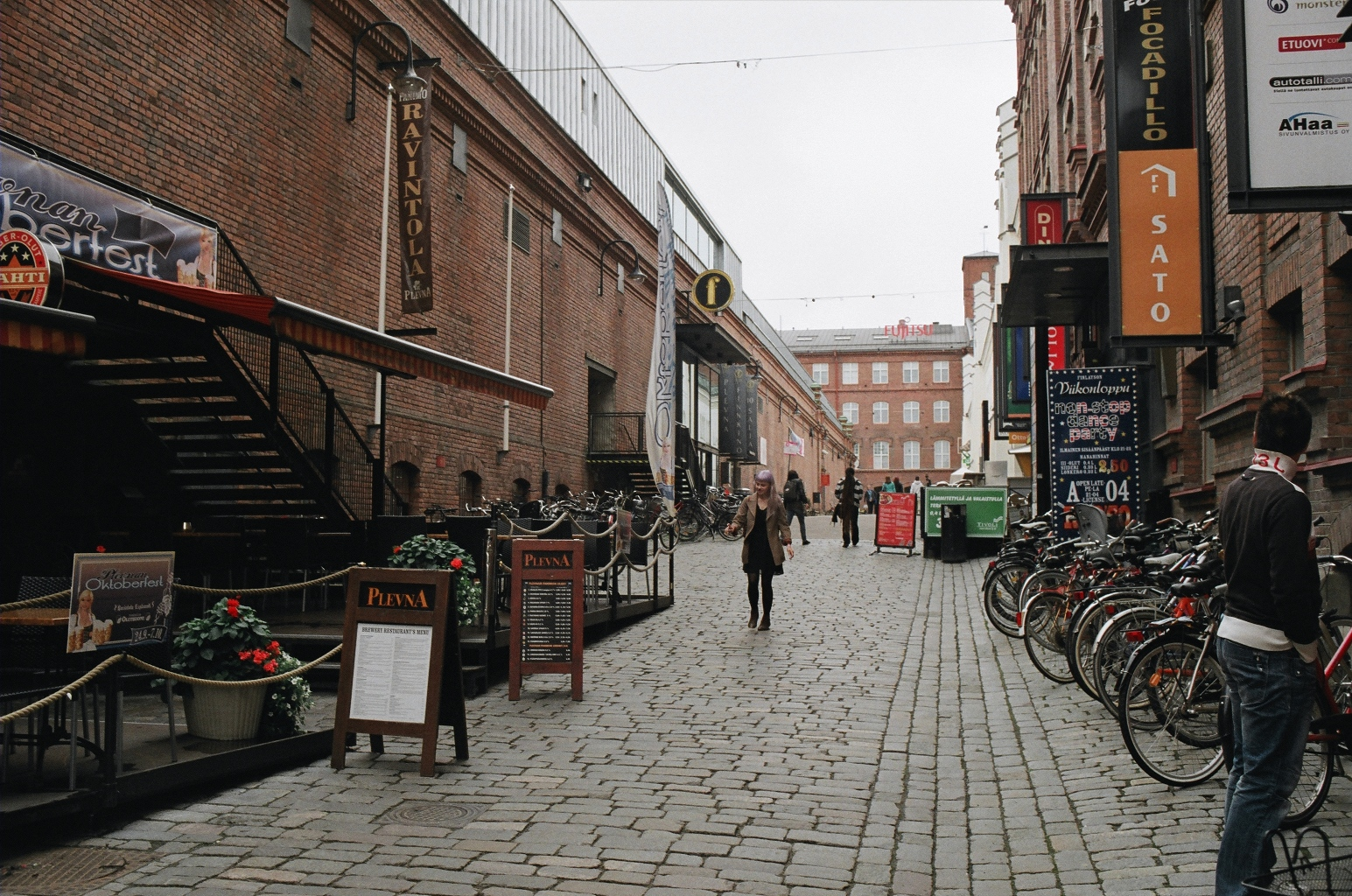
A view from the former industrial area of Finlayson in central, Tampere, Finland. The building on the left is "Plevna", and on the right there should be at least "Siperia" and "Katuvapriikki".

The Finlayson area also hosts the business centre Siperia which was opened in 2001 in the renovated premises of the old spinning hall. It has over ten businesses, mostly restaurants and cafés, but also other businesses such as the entertainment centre ZBase offering laser battles. The Plevna building to the west of Itäinenkatu hosts the Finnkino Plevna movie theatre, a brewery restaurant and a parking garage. There is a pedestrian tunnel leading from the shopping centre underneath Satakunnankatu to the Frenckell square. In June 2017 a Lidl grocery store was opened in the Seelanti building in the Finlayson area.
