= Wilhelm von Nottbeck Park =

Park in Tampere, Finland

Coordinates: 61.5032888°N 23.7563823°E

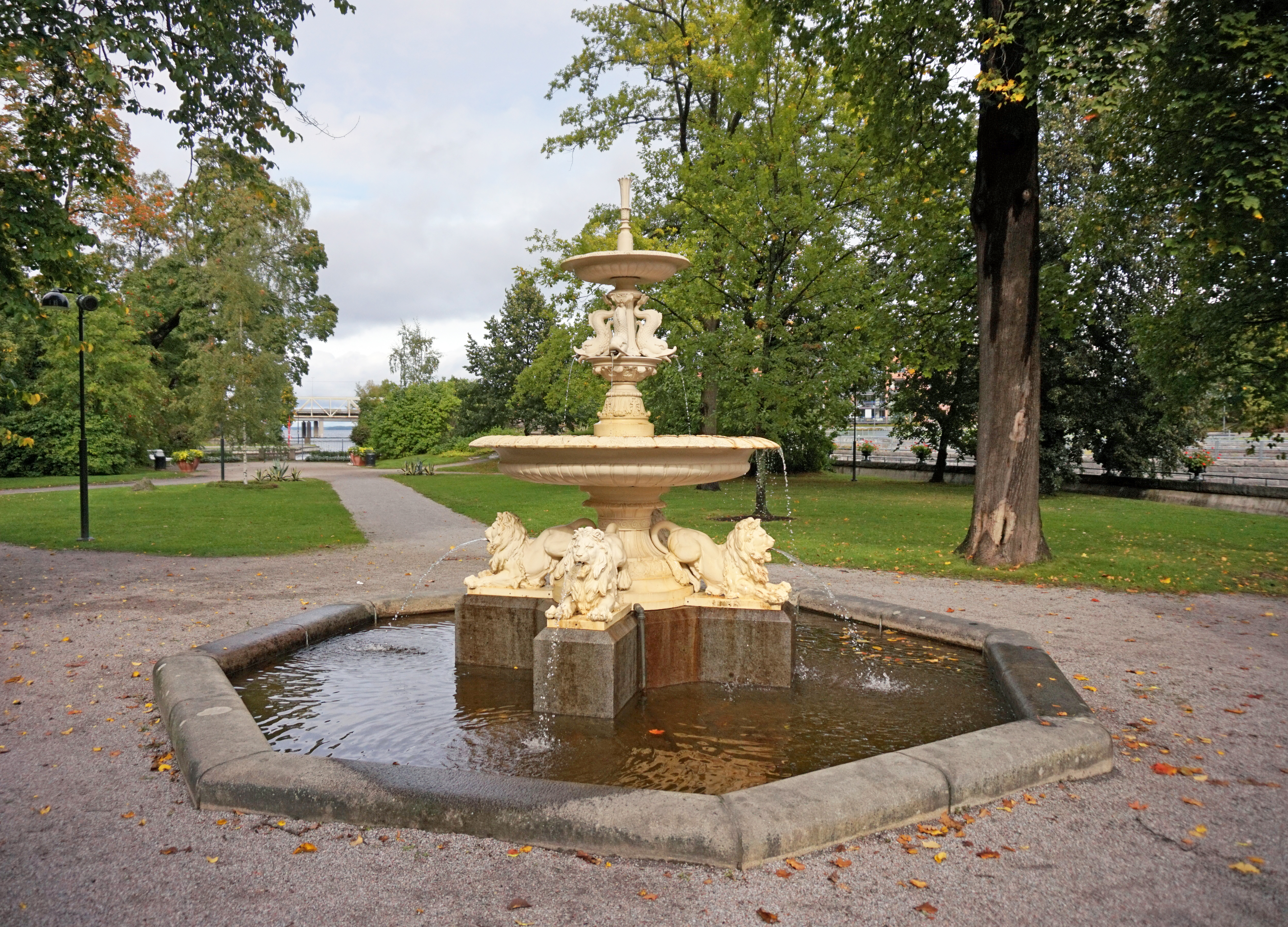
A fountain in the park

Wilhelm von Nottbeck Park (Finnish: Wilhelm von Nottbeckin puisto) is a park in Tampere, Finland, located in the historic Finlayson factory area. The park is named after William von Nottbeck (1816–1890), industrial manager at Finlayson, who built the park in 1848.

The park is English-style free-form park that strives for a natural impression. In the past, there were also greenhouses built in the 19th century, but they were demolished in the 1970s and replaced with a parking lot. The park was taken over by the city in 1995, when it also got its current name. Attractions in the park include the Finlayson Palace and the Kotkankallio Memorial.

== See also ==
- Finlayson (district)
- Näsilinna
