= Darlaston South =

Ward in the West Midlands, England

Darlaston South is a ward within the Metropolitan Borough of Walsall and is located within Darlaston, an industrial town in the West Midlands of England. It is located near Bilston, Walsall, Wednesbury, Willenhall and Tipton. It was historically part of Staffordshire.

Darlaston South has the largest ward population with a density of 4,809 people per square kilometer. This is slightly above the borough average of 3,159.

== History ==
=== World War II ===
On 5 June 1941, a German bomber targeting the Rubery Owen factory dropped a bomb that fell short of its intended target. The bomb struck Lowe Avenue in Darlaston, badly damaging five houses and causing lesser damage to several others. Eleven people were killed in the incident. Within a few weeks, most visible traces of the bombing had been removed, as the council carried out rapid repairs to the damaged houses.

In this incident, the casualties were as follows:

Road	House Number	Name	Age
Lowe Avenue	34	Henry John Mumford	44
	34	Emily Mumford	44
	36	Ellen Mills	60
	38	John Woodward	26
	38	Mary Woodward	25
	40	Ethel Cross	41
	40	Elsie May Prestidge	23
	40	Malcolm Thomas Prestidge	4 months
	42	Richard Perrins	47
	42	Henry Perrins	15
	42	Frank Perrins	12

=== Rubery Owen ===
Rubery Owen was a major British engineering and manufacturing company founded in 1884 by John and Edwin Rubery and later joined by Alfred Owen. Originally established as a wrought ironworks and fencing business in the Black Country, the company expanded rapidly during the twentieth century into steel production, automotive components, construction engineering, and industrial manufacturing.

Rubery Owen became one of the largest industrial firms in Britain and played a significant role in the development of the UK motor industry. The company manufactured pressed steel wheels, chassis components, suspension systems, and structural steelwork for a range of British vehicle manufacturers. It was also involved in major infrastructure and construction projects, producing steel frames and engineering products used across the United Kingdom and overseas.

In 1951, A. G. B. Owen set up the Owen Organisation so that a clear distinction could be made between the Owen Family's ownership of Rubery, Owen & Company Limited and their other investments. At this time, the company employed over 12,000 people.

In 1956, there was estimated to be around 6,000 employees at the Darlaston site. By 1964, this increased to 6,500 employees. The firm took over Old Park Works on Kings Hill, rebranding to become Rubery Owen Kings Hill Works.
