= Industrial city =

Type of city of a certain scale and economy

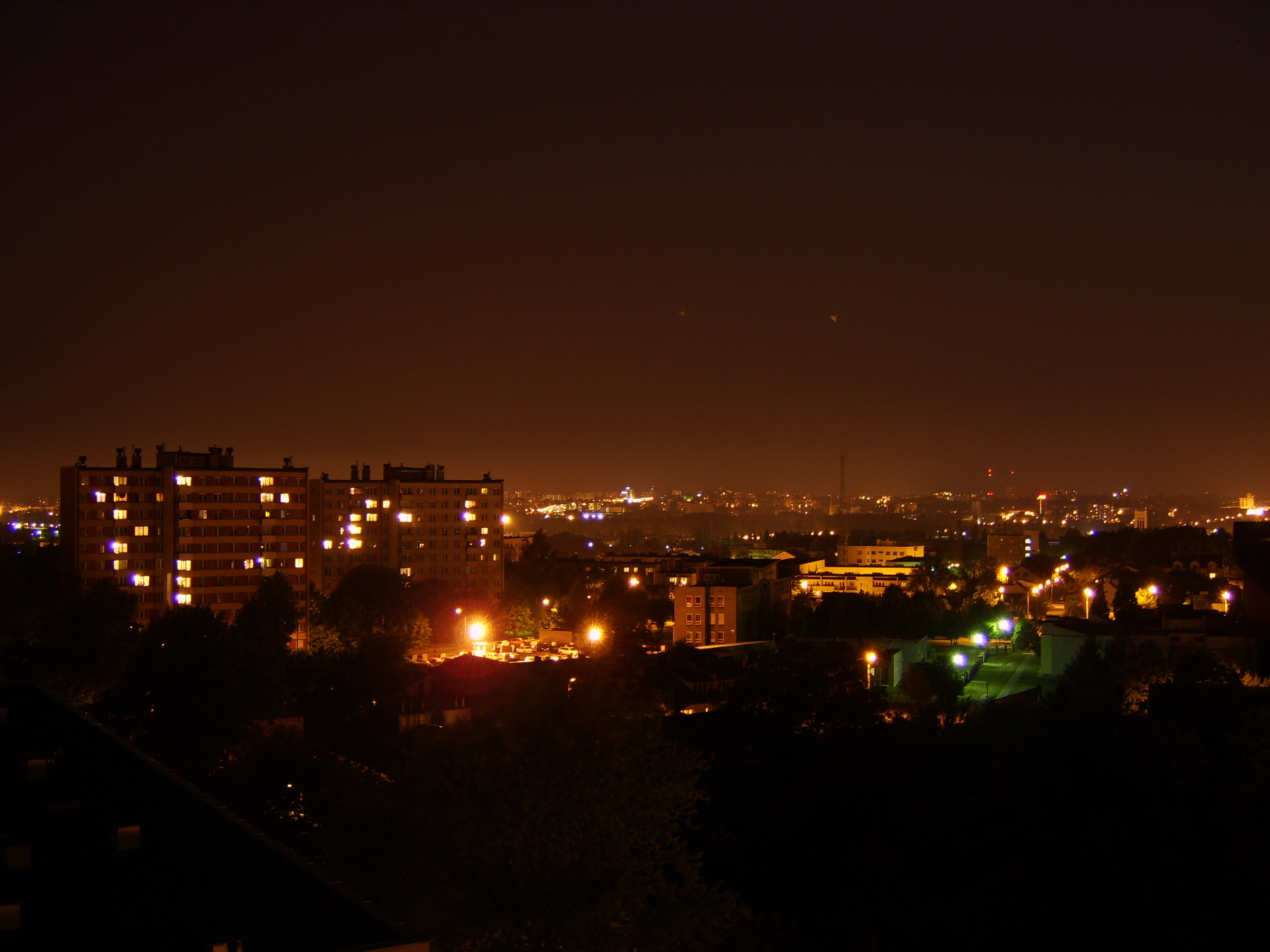
Lublin, an old commercial and industrial city in Poland

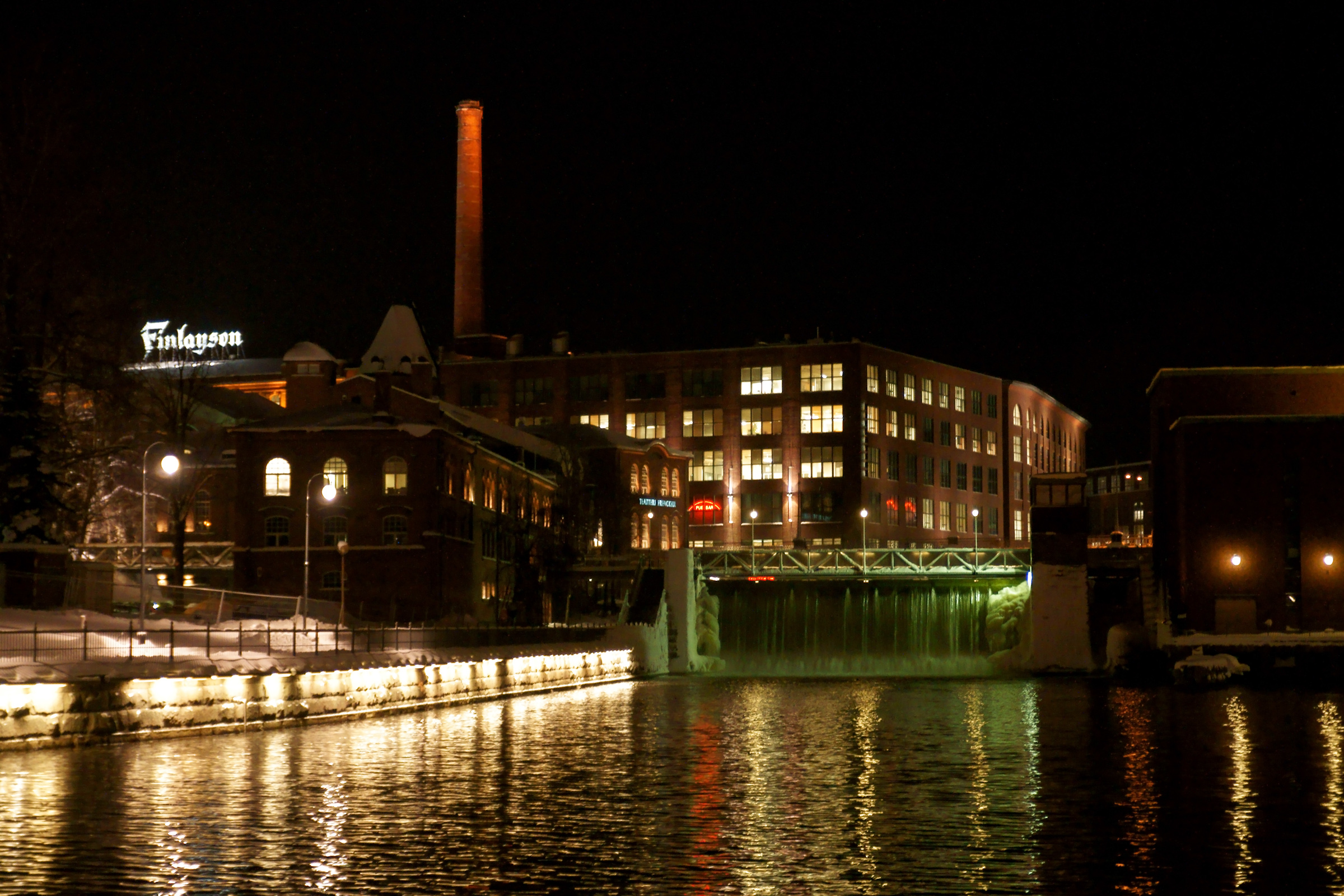
Tampere, in Finland, an old industrial city whose largest industry is the Finlayson textile factory, built in the 1820s by the Scot James Finlayson

An industrial city or industrial town is a town or city in which the municipal economy, at least historically, is centered around industry, with important factories or other production facilities in the town. It has been part of most countries' industrialization process. Air pollution and toxic waste have contributed to the lower life expectancy in some industrial cities. Industrial cities are distinguished from port cities or other transportation hubs, which deal in services. In countries with strong central planning, such as China and India, a city could be created on paper, and then industry found to locate there.

In the United States, which had much sparsely populated land, the industry typically preceded the town; the town grew up around a factory, mine, or source of water power. As the industry grew, and it and its employees needed goods and services, the town grew with and often around it, until in some cases the town became a city. It is a capitalistic and typically unplanned expansion. Examples are Scranton, Pennsylvania, and the mill towns of New England. Many American industrial cities are located in the Great Lakes region of the country, often referred to as the Rust Belt, referring to the declining industry and overall economy of many cities in the region. "The industrial city" as a nickname, though, most frequently refers to South San Francisco, where the term is inscribed on a hillside sign.

In Europe, where industries more frequently arose within existing cities, industrialization affected the internal structure of many of them. Potential needs such as raw materials, transportation and labor required for the establishment of industrial zones require consultation of the local and general public. Therefore, special policies are needed. This situation causes industrial zones and industrialists to take on an additional role in terms of policy. Since the industrial revolution, these subsidiaries remain important similarly. With this by the end of the nineteenth century the shape and functions of most cities, along with social relations and growing industries, naturally rebuilt Manchester, England, is considered to be the archetype of the industrial city on the basis of Friedrich Engels' observations.

In the Chinese-speaking world, the term "industrial city" refers to cities in which the municipal economy is led by heavy industries or the heavy industry is a significant impression of the city to people other than its local residents.
