= Finlayson Church =

Church in Tampere, Finland

Coordinates: 61°30′08″N 23°45′18″E

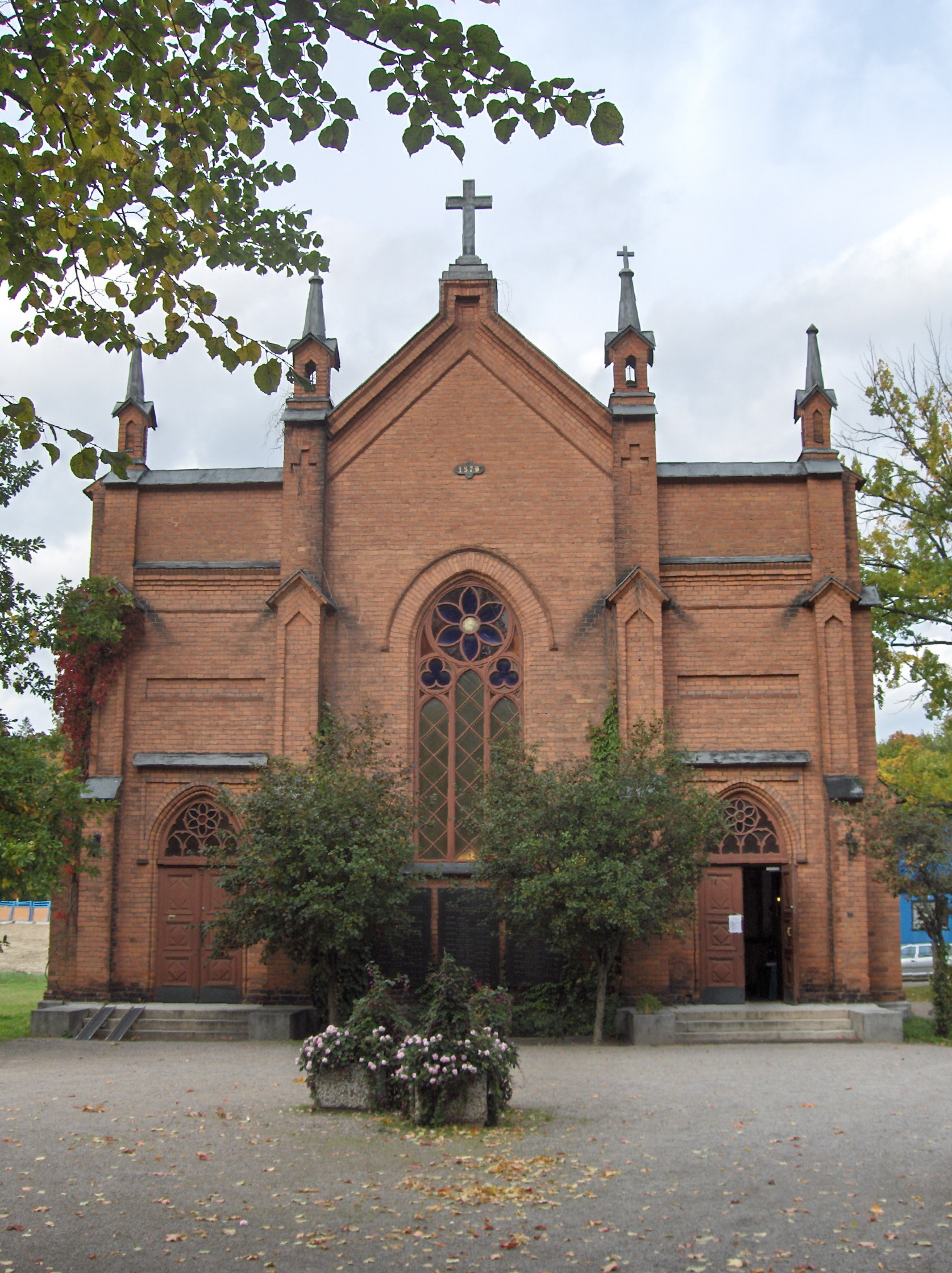
The Finlayson Church

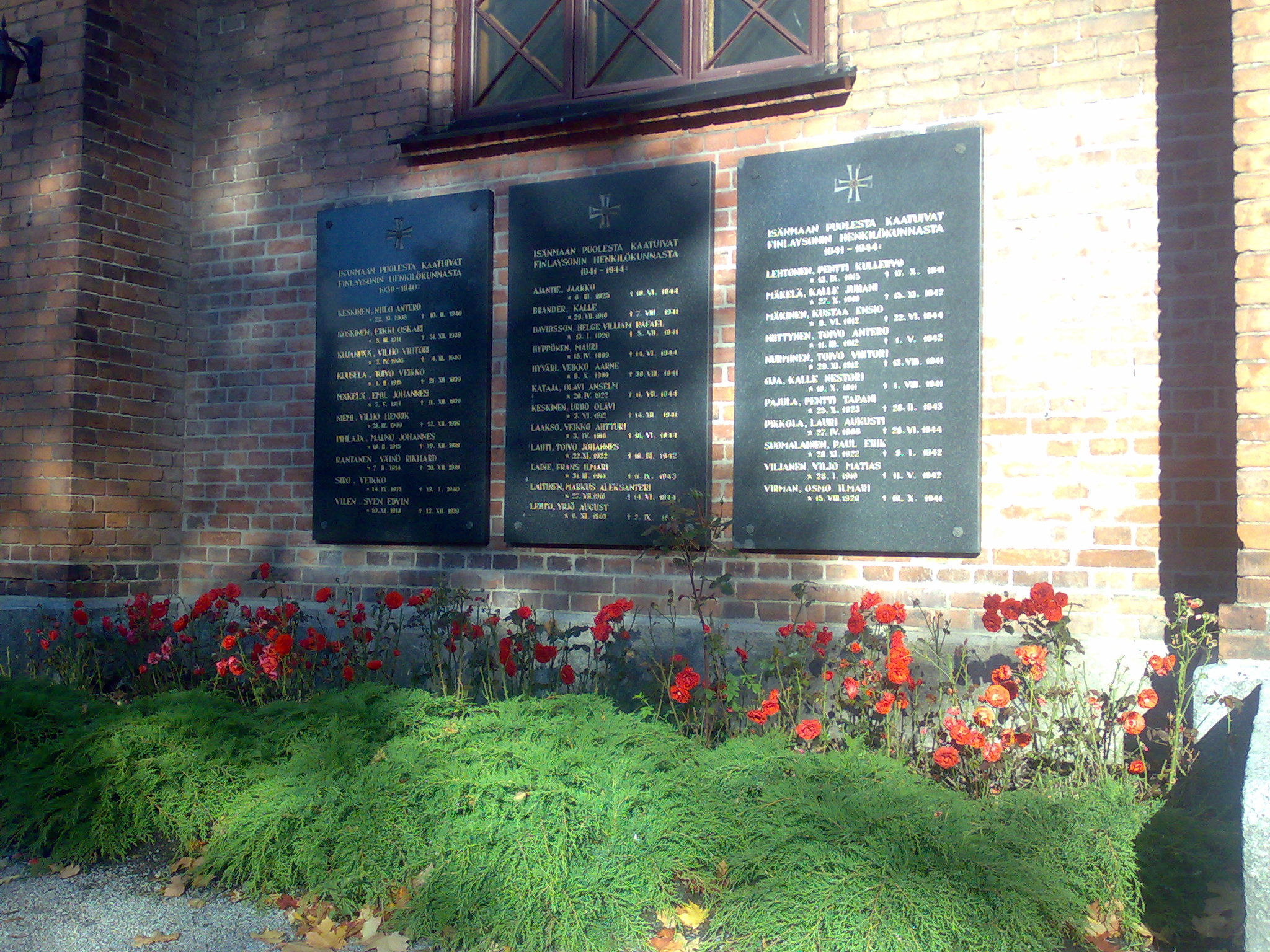
Commemorative plaques for war dead on the wall of the Finlayson church.

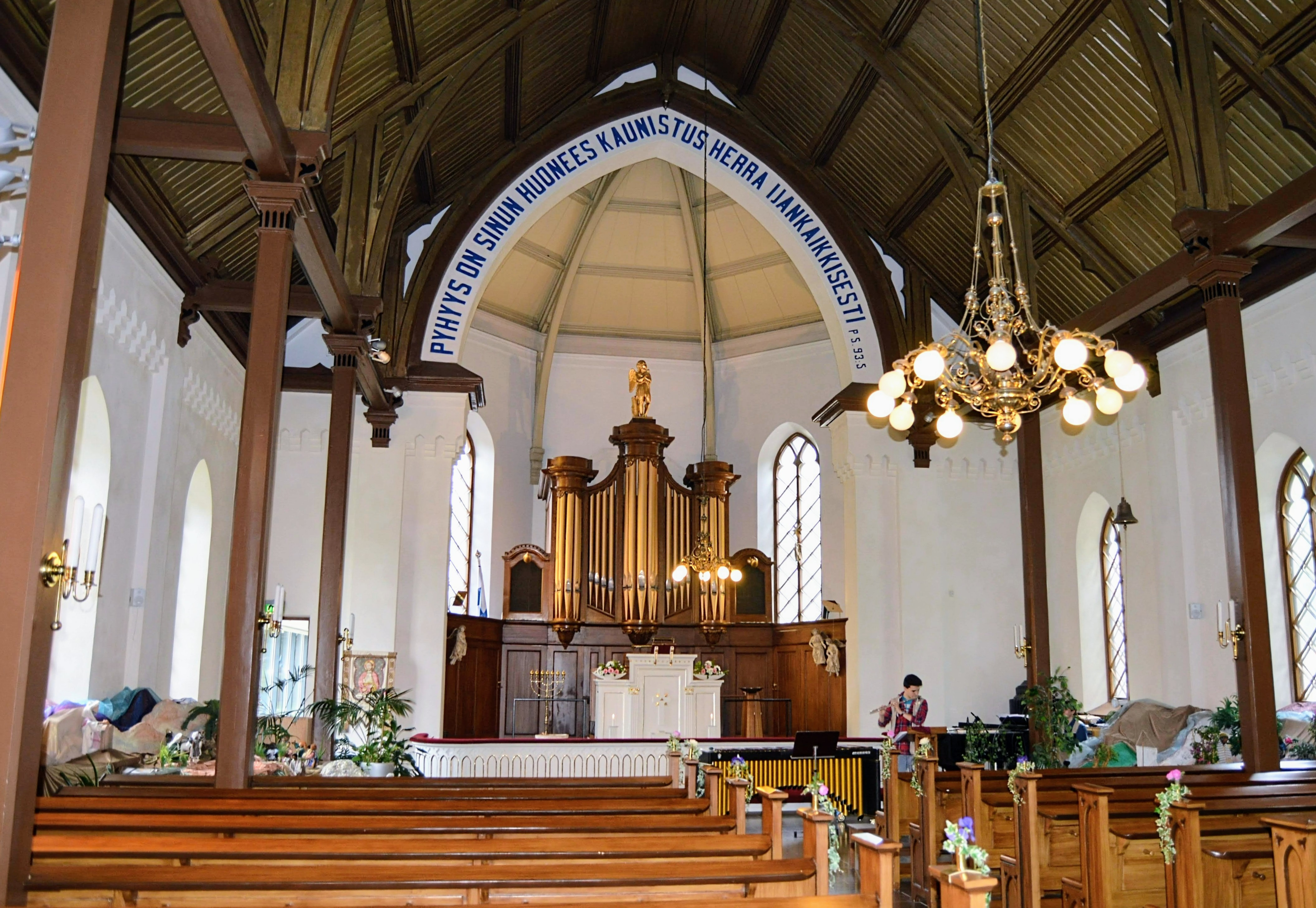
Interior (2015)

The Finlayson Church (Finnish: Finlaysonin kirkko; Swedish: Finlaysons kyrka) is a church built in Gothic Revival style located in the Finlayson industrial area in the district by the same name in Tampere, Finland. It was built in 1879 as the church of the Finlayson cotton factory, for the religious use of the factory's workers. Currently the church belongs to the Evangelical-Lutheran congregations of Tampere, and it is used as a children's road church and a popular church for weddings.

== History ==
The church was built for the use of the Finlayson factory workers in 1879. It was built primarily for the religious devotions of the workers, but the first working day of the year was started with a service there until the 1970s. The Finlayson factory workers founded their own congregation from 1846 to 1860. The factory had its own priest, a factory preacher, until 1982. The factory donated the church and the lot on which it stood, for free, to the Evangelist-Lutheran congregation in Tampere in 1981. A condition for the transfer was that the church must continue to be called the Finlayson Church.

== Architecture ==
The church was designed by the city architect of Tampere at the time, Frans Ludvig Calonius. The material for the church's facade is clean red brick. It resembles an English congregationalist church in that the preaching chair and the organ are unusually located behind the altar. The church also has no kind of altar table or sculpture whatsoever. The church used to have benches stretching the full width of its hallway, but these were later separated into two parts by a corridor in the middle.

The church's organ was built by the company William Hill & Son in the 1850, and they were brought to the church from St. Petersburg, Russia, in 1879.

The church was repaired from September 2007 to late summer 2008. The plank floor was replaced with a plate floor. The church's colour was also changed to a darker shade.

== Current activity ==
The church is currently owned by the Evangelist-Lutheran congregation of Tampere. The church seats 280 people.

The Finlayson Church is used as the only children's church in Finland. The children's altars have a Children's Bible, and next to it are installations depicting various biblical events. As the church was built as a prayer room, it does not hold a regular Sunday service. Because of its central location, small size and pleasant architecture, the church is one of the most popular wedding churches in Tampere.

== Sources ==
- Tampereen seurakunnat: Finlaysonin kirkko Accessed on 28 May 2008.
