= Väinö Linna Square =

Square in Tampere, Finland

Coordinates: 61°30′06″N 23°45′34″E

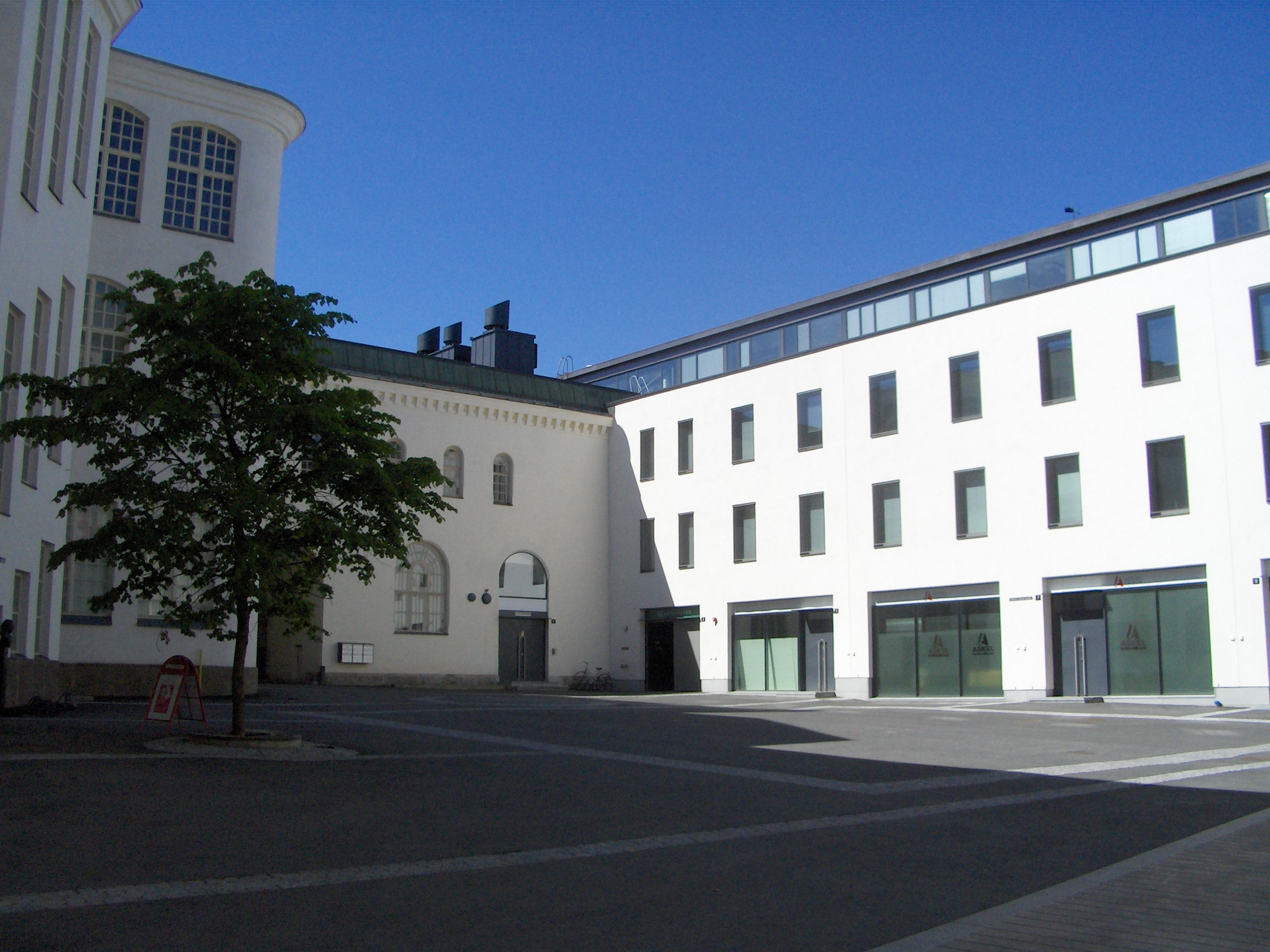
The Väinö Linna Square in 2006

The Väinö Linna Square (Finnish: Väinö Linnan aukio) is a courtyard-type square at the Finlayson's old factory area in Tampere, Finland. It is part of the Tammerkoski rapids' industrial landscape, which in 2009 was classified by the Finnish Heritage Agency as a nationally significant built cultural environment. Today, the buildings surrounding the square include the Werstas Labour Museum and Mehiläinen Private Hospital. The oldest building in the square is the six-storey old factory called Kuusivooninkinen (1837), which was Finland's first modern factory building. In 1995, the square was named after Väinö Linna. Linna, who was later known as a very significant writer, had formerly worked in that building for a couple of years, before his conscription into the army in 1940.

Finlayson's textile production in the area ended in the mid-1990s, after which renovation of the buildings began. The Väinö Linna Square was renovated in 2005. At the same time, a new hospital was completed on its edge, on the site of a demolished factory building, and The Portrait of Väinö Linna (1995) was placed on the outer wall; the granite statue is one of the latest works by sculptor Raimo Heino.
