= Finnish euro coins =

Designs of Finnish currency

Finnish euro coins (Finnish: Suomalaiset eurokolikot) (Swedish: Finska euromynt) feature three designs. Heikki Häiväoja provided the design for the 1 cent – 50 cent coins, Pertti Mäkinen provided the design for the 1 euro coin, and Raimo Heino provided the design for the 2 euro coin, which shows cloudberry, the golden berry of northern Finland. All designs feature the 12 stars of the EU and the year of imprint.

In December 2024, following the announcement of plans to end the operations of the Mint of Finland, it was announced that the contracts for minting Finnish coins would be awarded to the Royal Dutch Mint, and that the coins would be minted under the flag of Helsinki Mint.

== Finnish euro design ==
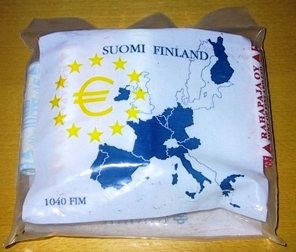
Finnish Euro starter kit

For images of the common side and a detailed description of the coins, see euro coins.

The first sets of euro coins were minted in 1999 and the euro was put into circulation in the eurozone in 2002. Like Belgium, France, the Netherlands and Spain, the first euro coins of Finland are marked 1999, not 2002.

Finnish euro coins dated 1999–2006 carry the mint mark M which is the initial of the mint master at the Mint of Finland, Raimo Makkonen.

Depiction of Finnish euro coinage (first series) | Obverse side
€ 0.01	€ 0.02	€ 0.05
The heraldic lion of Finland found on the Coat of arms of Finland.
€ 0.10	€ 0.20	€ 0.50
The heraldic lion of Finland found on the Coat of arms of Finland
€ 1.00	€ 2.00	€ 2 Coin Edge
		The edge reads SUOMI FINLAND (the name of the country in Finnish and Swedish, its two official languages) and contains three lion heads
Two swans flying over a Finnish landscape. The whooper swan is the Finnish national bird.	The fruit and leaves of the cloudberry.	The edge reads SUOMI FINLAND (the name of the country in Finnish and Swedish, its two official languages) and contains three lion heads

=== Amendments ===
In December 2006, the Bank of Finland announced the following:

"The national sides of euro coins will be amended so that each issuing Member State will add its name or abbreviation (FI for Finland) on the coins. On Finnish coins the first letter of the Mint of Finland’s President and CEO (M for Raimo Makkonen) will also be replaced with the Mint’s logo. Amendments to the national sides affect all denominations of euro coins.

"Each euro area Member State will decide on the schedule for the introduction of their new coins. In Finland the new coins will be put into circulation in January 2007. The current coins will remain valid, and coins in stock will be put into circulation as necessary. This way coins with the new designs will mix with the current coins in circulation."

Finland was the first state in the EMU (European Monetary Union) to implement these changes.

Depiction of the amended Finnish euro coinage | Obverse side
€ 0.01	€ 0.02	€ 0.05
The heraldic lion of Finland found on the Coat of arms of Finland.
€ 0.10	€ 0.20	€ 0.50
The heraldic lion of Finland found on the Coat of arms of Finland
€ 1.00	€ 2.00	€ 2 Coin Edge
		The edge reads SUOMI FINLAND (the name of the country in Finnish and Swedish, its two official languages) and contains three lion heads
Two swans flying over a Finnish landscape. The whooper swan is the Finnish national bird.	The fruit and leaves of the cloudberry.	The edge reads SUOMI FINLAND (the name of the country in Finnish and Swedish, its two official languages) and contains three lion heads

Finland again amended the design of its coins in the 2008 issue, repositioning the mint mark and putting it on the inside of the coin.

== Circulating mintage quantities ==
The following table shows the mintage quantity for all Finnish euro coins, per denomination, per year.

Face value	€0.01	€0.02	€0.05	€0.10	€0.20	€0.50	€1.00	€2.00
1999	8,100,000	1,785,000	63,380,000	133,520,000	42,350,000	20,696,000	16,210,000	16,090,000
2000	7,600,000	13,937,000	56,660,000	167,449,000	500,000	67,097,000	36,639,000	8,680,000
2001	500,000	500,000	213,756,000	14,730,000	121,763,000	4,432,000	13,862,000	29,132,000
2002	659,000	659,000	101,824,000	1,499,000	100,759,000	1,147,000	14,114,000	1,386,000
2003	6,790,000	6,790,000	790,000	790,000	790,000	790,000	790,000	9,080,000
2004	9,690,000	8,024,000	629,000	629,000	629,000	629,000	5,529,000	9,029,000
2005	5,800,000	5,800,000	800,000	800,000	800,000	4,800,000	7,935,000	9,700,000
2006	4,000,000	1,000,000	1,000,000	1,000,000	1,000,000	6,850,000	1,705,000	8,502,000
2007	3,000,000	3,000,000	1,000,000	1,000,000	1,000,000	1,000,000	1,000,000	5,190,000
2008	1,500,000	1,500,000	1,000,000	1,000,000	1,000,000	8,000,000	1,000,000	8,300,000
2009	1,000,000	1,000,000	1,000,000	1,000,000	1,000,000	7,000,000	1,000,000	6,300,000
2010	800,000	800,000	800,000	800,000	800,000	800,000	800,000	4,000,000
2011	800,000	800,000	800,000	800,000	8.800,000	3.800,000	800,000	5,300,000
2012	800,000	800,000	800,000	10,800,000	10,800,000	4,800,000	800,000	3,300,000
2013	400,000	400,000	400,000	400,000	400,000	400,000	400,000	900,000
2014	200,000	200,000	13,780,000	200,000	200,000	200,000	200,000	200,000
2015	200,000	200,000	200,000	10,200,000	10,200,000	200,000	200,000	200,000
2016	200,000	200,000	200,000	200,000	200,000	200,000	200,000	200,000
2017	100,000	100,000	10,180,000	100,000	100,000	100,000	100,000	100,000
2018	50,000	50,000	50,000	50,000	50,000	50,000	50,000	2,050,000
2019	—N/a	—N/a	7,980,000	—N/a	—N/a	—N/a	—N/a	5,970,000
2020	s	s	s	s	s	s	s	s
2021	s	s	s	s	s	s	s	s
2022	s	s	s	s	s	s	s	s
2023	s	s	s	s	s	s	s	s
2024	s	s	s	s	s	s	s	s
— No coins were minted that year for that denomination s Small quantities minted for sets only

== Identifying marks ==
National identifier	"FI" (Note: As applied to the 2007 amended design onward.)
Mint Mark	(2007-2010), heraldic lion logo (2011-2024), (Note: This mark was also used on the 2010 commemorative coin.) (2025-present)
Head of the Mint initials	M (Mr. Raimo Makkonen; until 2006)
€2 edge inscription	

== €2 commemorative coins ==
Year	Subject	Volume

60th anniversary of the United Nations and the 50th anniversary of Finland's UN membership (2005)

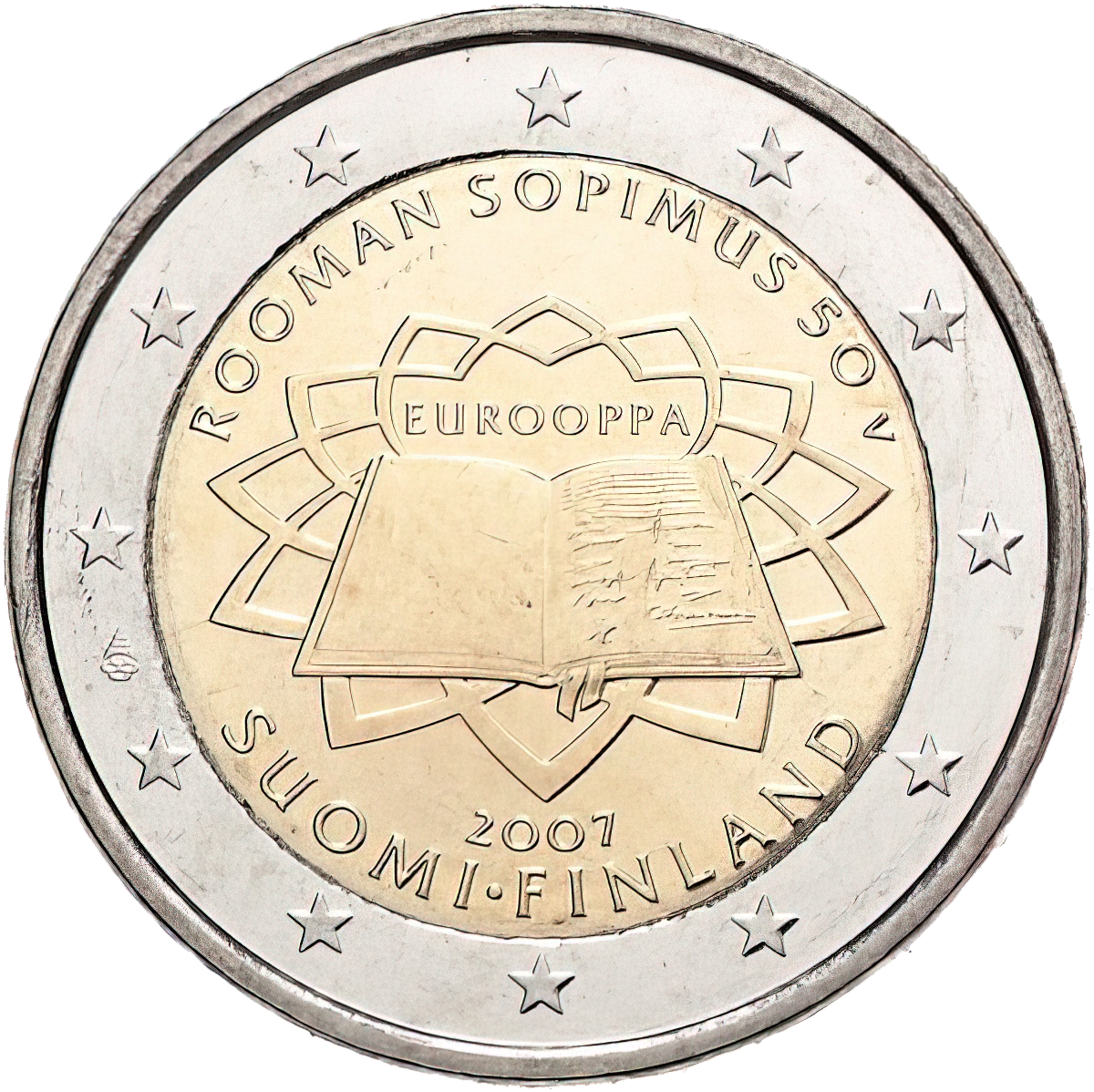
50th Anniversary of the Treaty of Rome (2007)

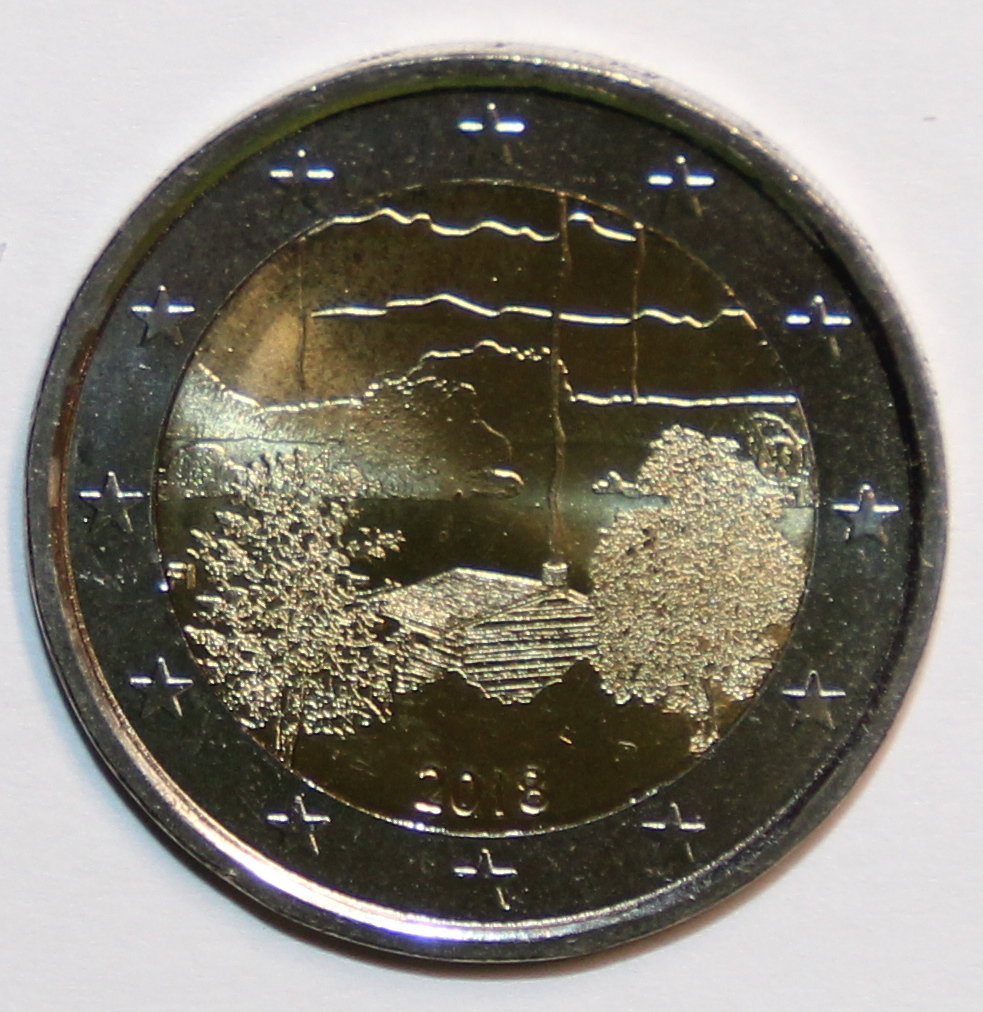
Commemorating Finnish Sauna culture (2018)

== Other commemorative coins (collectors' coins) ==
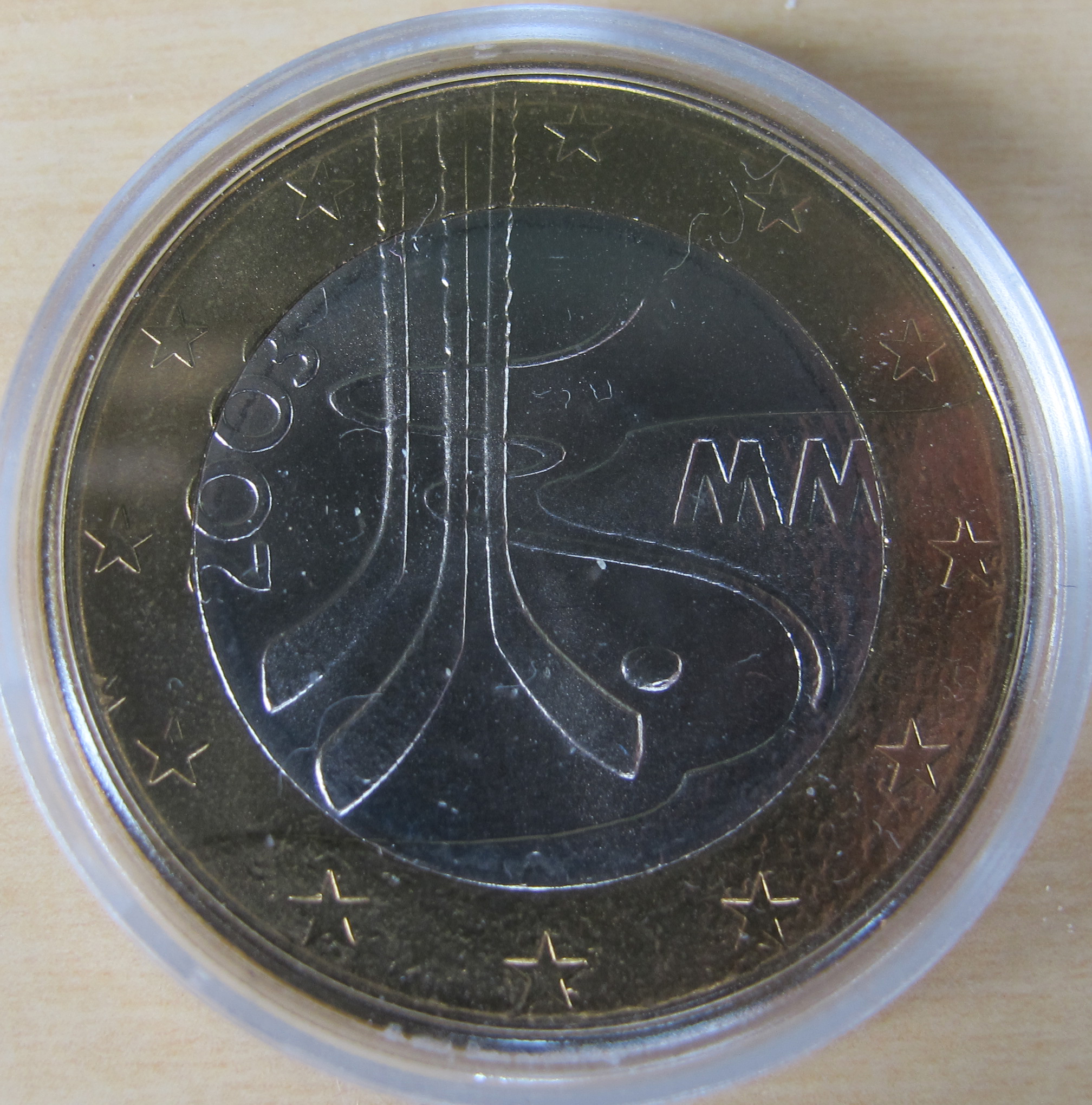
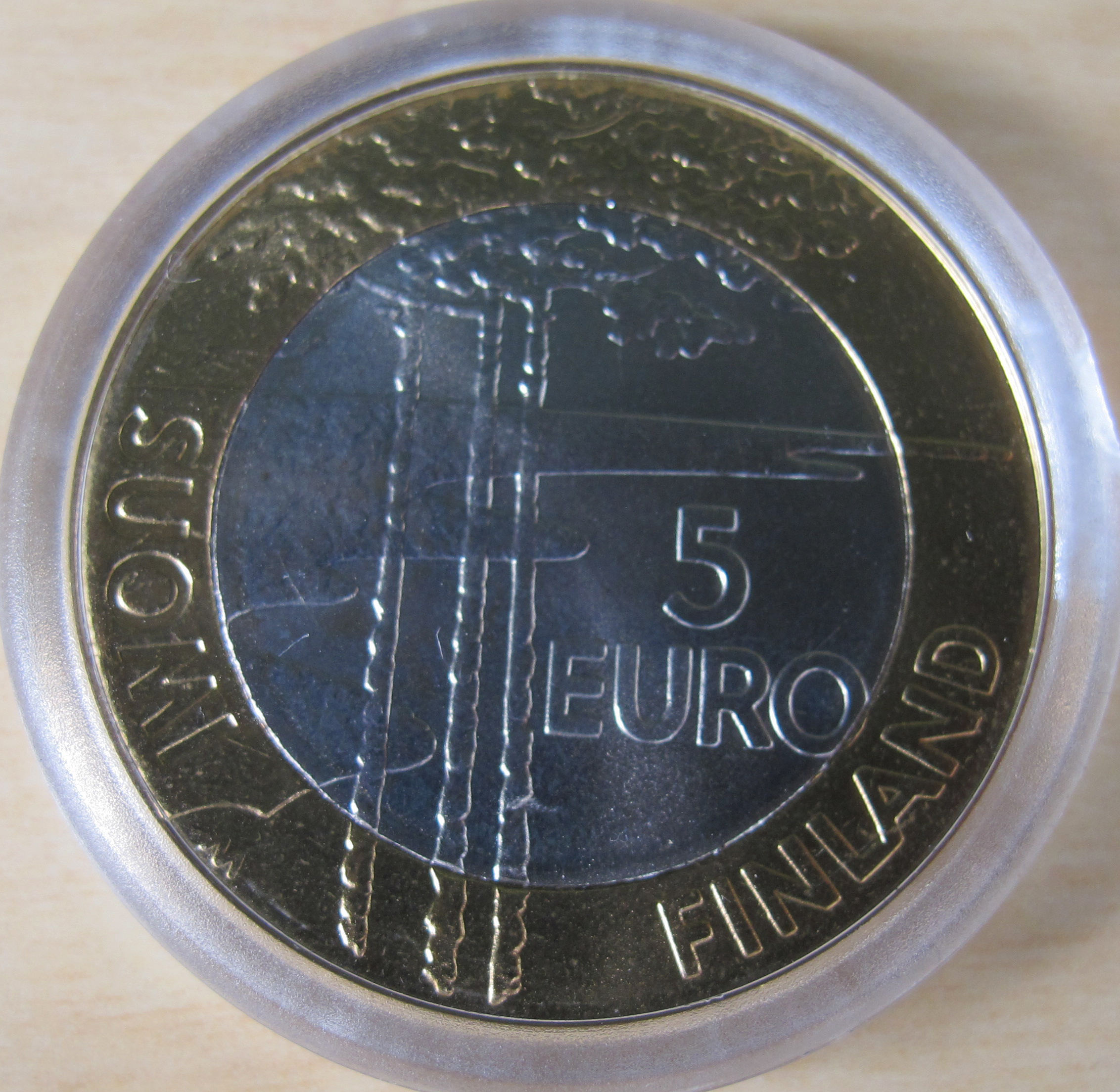
Ice Hockey World Championships 2003 commemorative coin designed by Pertti Mäkinen, published by Mint of Finland, nominal value 5 €

Finland has a collection of euro commemorative coins, mainly in silver and gold, although other materials are used. Their face values range from 5 euro to 100 euro. This is mainly done as a legacy of old national practice of minting gold and silver coins. These coins are not intended to be used as means of payment, so generally they do not circulate.

== International coin trading ==
In June 2009, Finland and the Netherlands coordinated a unique trade at European level. Excess Finnish 5 cent coins were traded for Dutch two-euro coins. In total five truckloads containing 30 million five cent coins were traded for 3 million Dutch two-euro coins. This trade saved both countries a lot of money in production and material costs. An estimated 120,000 kg of metal has been saved with this trade alone. In 2010 this exact trade has been repeated, helping Finland rid some of its 5-cent excesses, pumping in a new supply of two-euro coins, and saving both countries a lot of money.

== Usage of 1 cent and 2 cent coins ==
Finnish businesses and banks have employed a method known as "Swedish rounding" when tallying sums. Due in large part to the inefficiency of producing and accepting the 1 cent and 2 cent coins, Finland has opted to remove these coins from general circulation in order to offset the cost involved in accepting them.

While individual prices are still shown and summed up with €0.01 precision, the total sum is then rounded to the nearest five cents when paying with cash. Sums ending in 1, 2, 6 and 7 cents are rounded down; sums ending in 3, 4, 8 and 9 cents are rounded up.

The 1 cent and 2 cent coins are legal tender and are minted for collector sets as required by the EMU agreement.

When paying in cash in Finland, while by law a shopkeeper should accept the coins, usually they will decline, and ask for higher denominations to match the Swedish rounding, even when presented with exact change.

== See also ==
- Adoption of the euro in Finland
