= James Finlayson (industrialist) =

British business magnate (1772-1852)

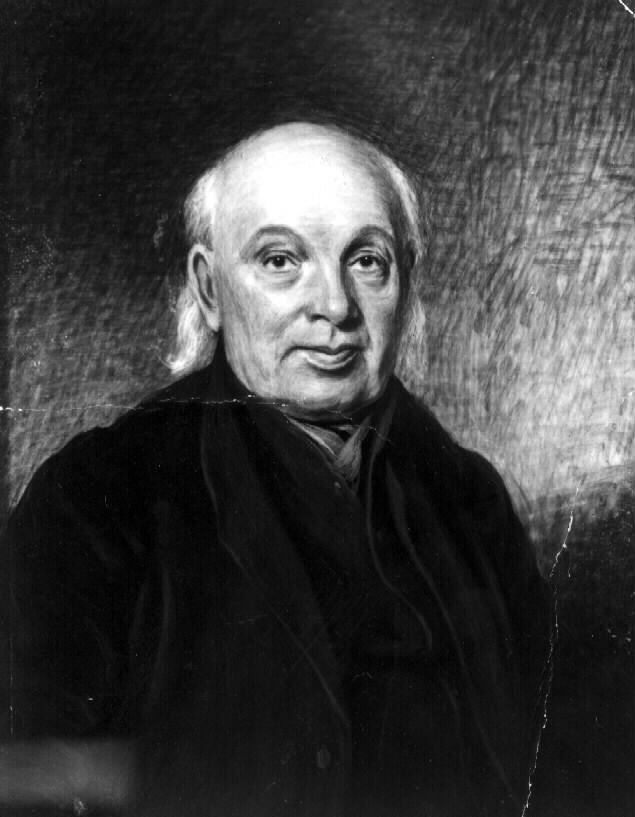
- James Finlayson before 1852
- Born: August 1772
- Died: August 1852 (aged 79–80)
- Occupation: Businessman

James Finlayson (29 August 1772 in Penicuik, Scotland – 18 August 1852 in Edinburgh, Scotland) was a Scottish Quaker who, in effect, brought the Industrial Revolution to Tampere, Finland, founding in 1820 the Finlayson company.

Finlayson was born 1772 in Penicuik and became a self-trained engineer. In 1817, he moved to St. Petersburg to found a textile factory with the backing of Tsar Alexander I of Russia.

In 1819 Finlayson visited the Grand Duchy of Finland, at the time under Russian rule. During his religious mission to sell bibles, he visited Tampere. The next year, Finlayson received permission from the Senate of Finland to build a factory in Tampere using water power from the Tammerkoski rapids. He moved to Tampere with his wife Margaret Finlayson.

At first, Finlayson had to import machinists from Britain to train new workers. The first factory was completed in 1823 with the aid of a state loan, with the stipulation that the technology employed could be freely inspected by the public to further civic technological advancement. Initially he manufactured machinery suitable for the textile industry, but in 1828 switched from machine manufacture to cotton mills. He also founded an orphanage.

== Finlayson & Compagnie ==
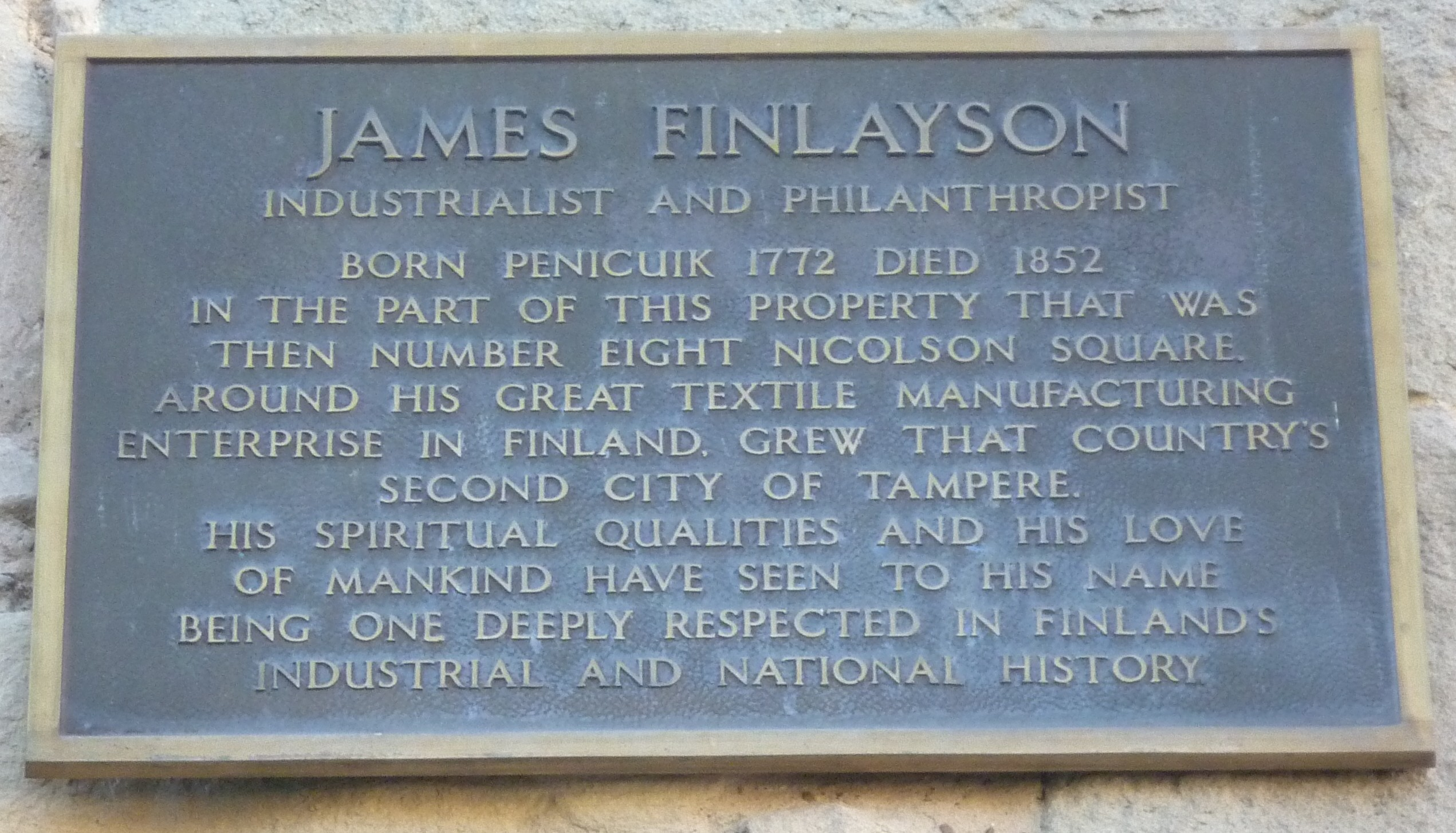
Finlayson plaque on the house in Edinburgh where he died

On 1 March 1836, Finlayson sold the factory to Georg Rauch and Karl Samuel Nottbeck on condition that they would retain his name for the factory. The new owners complied and founded Finlayson & Compagnie. Finlayson worked in an advisory capacity for a couple of years before moving back to the United Kingdom, where he died in 1852 in Edinburgh.

The company grew to be Tampere's largest employer, employing, at its peak, over 3,000 people. It still produces textiles. In 1995 the old factories in the center of Tampere were closed down, and the old buildings converted to a commercial and entertainment district.

A weaving hall, completed in 1877 and at the time the largest in the Nordic countries, housed a total of 1,200 power looms. In accordance with the custom of naming significant new buildings after recent or current events, it was named Plevna after the Siege of Plevna, under Ottoman control, by the joint army of Russian Empire and Kingdom of Romania. It now houses a brewpub and the cinema multiplex Finnkino Plevna.

=== Electric lighting ===
The Plevna building was the first in any of the Nordic countries and the fourth in Europe to be equipped with incandescent lighting. The lighting with 120 "8 candle" bulbs was first switched on 15 March 1882. The Edison "dynamo" No. 24 is still located in the building. The system used 110 volt direct current; this system was adopted for all of Tampere, resulting in a war of currents with the latter introduced Westinghouse alternating current.
