= Finnkino Plevna =

Cinema in Tampere, Finland

Coordinates: 61°30′08″N 23°45′27″E

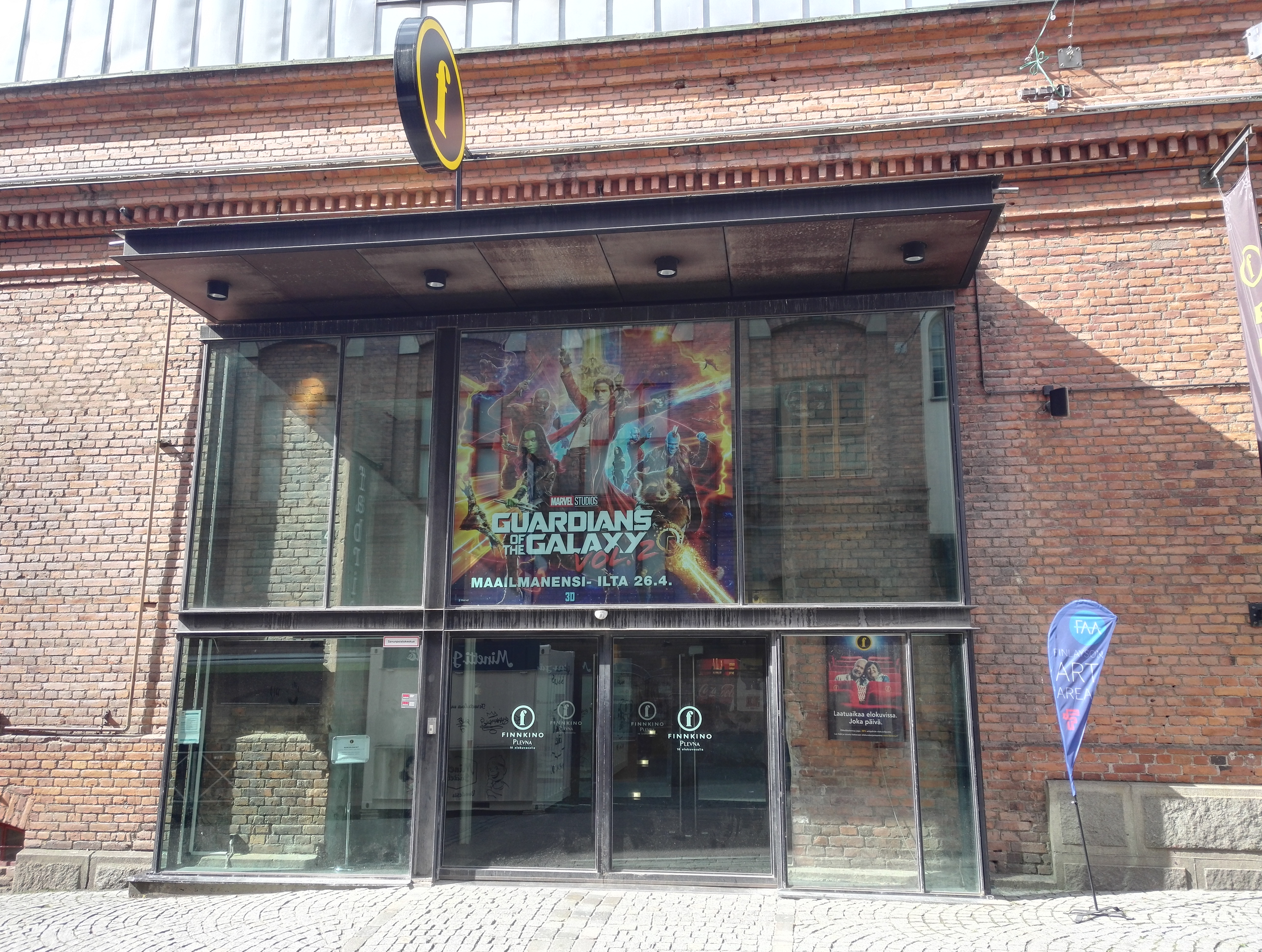
Entrance to Plevna.

Plevna is a Finnkino movie theatre in central Tampere, Finland, in the Finlayson district. With its ten auditoria it is the largest movie theatre in Tampere and one of the largest in Finland. The theatre is located in the old Finlayson industrial area in the old Plevna industrial building. The theatre was opened in 1999 and it has a total of 1653 seats.

Plevna is one of the premises of the annual Tampere Film Festival.
