= Finlayson (district) =

City district in Tampere, Finland

Coordinates: 61.5021°N 23.7574°E

- Subdivision
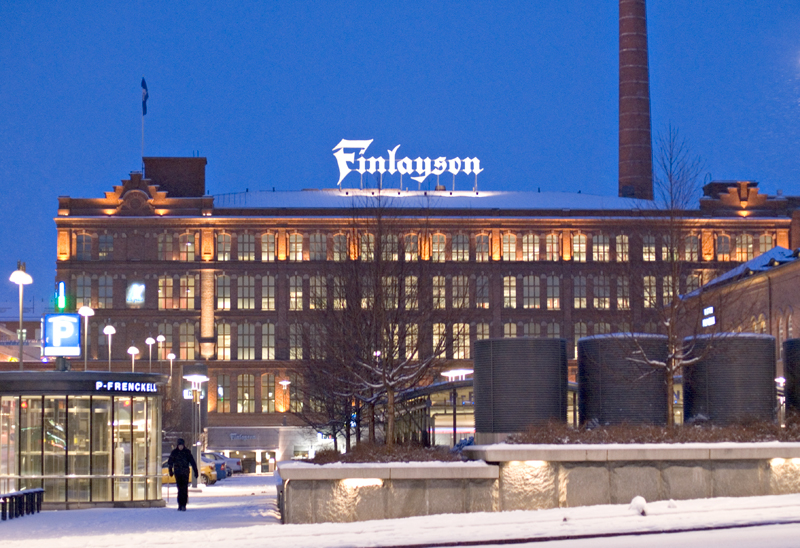
- Finlayson industrial building in the district

- Position of Finlayson district within Tampere.
- Country: Finland
- Region: Pirkanmaa
- Sub-region: Tampere
- Municipality: Tampere
- Major district: Central
- Population (2024): 1,901
- Postal codes: 33210
- Subdivision number: 101

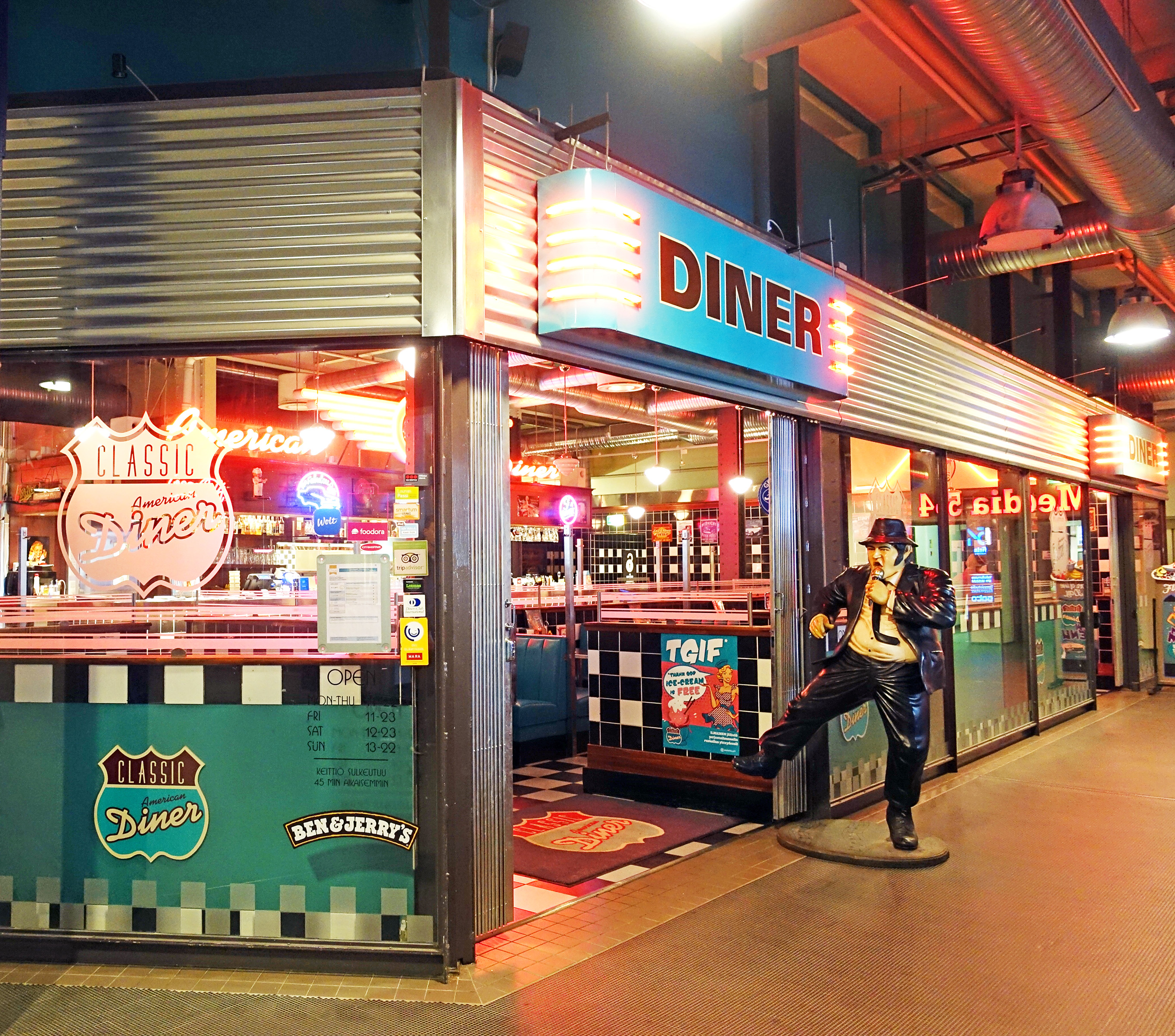
Classic American Diner restaurant in the Finlayson district

Finlayson (formerly known as Näsi) is a neighbourhood in the city center of Tampere, Finland, and as the name implies, it consists of the old factory area of Finlayson, as well as Näsinpuisto, the Mustanlahti harbor area and the residential blocks delimited by Hämeenpuisto and Satakunnankatu. To the east, the area borders Tammerkoski. Area attractions include Tallipiha and Finlayson Church. There are also three palace buildings in the district: Näsilinna (Näsi Castle), Finlayson Palace (Finlaysonin palatsi) and Pikkupalatsi (Little Palace).

The area starts at Näsilinnankatu and Kuninkaankatu, which extend to Nalkala, and Puuvillatehtaankatu and Näsijärvenkatu, which cross Hämeenpuisto. Neighboring parts of the city are Tammerkoski in the south and Amuri in the west.

Originally, the Finlayson area on the west side of the cotton mill was a residential area for mill workers and clerks; however, the estates inhabited by workers and white-collar workers were quite different in appearance.

== See also ==
- Lake Näsijärvi
- Näsilinna
- Väinö Linna Square
