= Raimo Heino =

Finnish designer of coins, relief figures and medallions

Raimo Heino (September 13, 1932 – November 30, 1995) was a Finnish designer of coins, relief figures and medallions.

He was the designer of the Finnish 2 euro coin. All designs feature the 12 stars of the EU and the year of imprint on the front side and a national design on the other; Heino's work shows cloudberry, the golden berry of northern Finland. He was also the designer of the Nevanlinna Prize medal, named after the Finnish mathematician Rolf Nevanlinna. He made sculpture of steel and stone.

== Sources ==
- Kuvataiteilijamatrikkeli.fi
