= Finlayson (company) =

Finnish textile manufacturer

Finlayson Oy
- Logo used since 1820
- Type: Osakeyhtiö
- Industry: Textiles
- Founded: 1820; 206 years ago
- Founder: James Finlayson
- Headquarters: Helsinki OR Stockholm, Finland, Sweden, Japan
- Number of locations: 45 (Stores)
- Key people: Jukka Kurttila (CEO)
- Revenue: €25.7 million (2024)
- Number of employees: 68 (2024)
- Parent: Asko; Manna & Co
- Website: finlayson.fi

Finlayson Oy is a Finnish textile manufacturer. The company was founded in 1820 when James Finlayson, a Scottish engineer, established a cotton mill in Tampere. The company manufactures various interior textiles and bedding under the brand names Finlayson and Familon. The company has stores and retailers in Finland, Russia, and the Baltic countries, as well as an online store.

The Plevna, a Finlayson building, was the first building in the Nordic countries and in the Russian Empire (of which Finland was part at the time) to be lit by electric lighting; the light bulbs of Thomas Edison were first used there on 15 March 1882.

== Recent history ==
=== 2014 Acquisition ===
In June 2014, the owner CapMan sold Finlayson's home textile operations to Jukka Kurttila and Petri Pesonen, the founders of the advertising agency Bob the Robot, and to Risto Voutilainen, who had a background in the financial sector. Jukka Kurttila became the CEO of Finlayson. At the same time, Familon was sold to the Swedish-Estonian textile manufacturer Peter Hunt and his company Wendre, which has operated as a subcontractor for companies such as Ikea.

In 2019, Finlayson acquired the Reino and Aino slippers brand.

=== Manna & Co 2021–2025 ===
In 2021, the ownership of Finlayson, Makia Clothing Oy, and Vallila Interior was consolidated into a new holding company called Manna & Co. In addition to these, the new company had purchased a 20 percent stake in the Sasta company, and Finlayson's subsidiary Reino & Aino was also included. The key shareholders of each company continued as owners of the parent company, and the arrangement was partially carried out through a share exchange.

In October 2023, Manna & Co filed an application for corporate restructuring at the Helsinki District Court. At the same time, applications for restructuring proceedings were also filed for its subsidiaries Finlayson, Makia, and Vallila.

In April 2025, the owners of Manna & Co filed their company for bankruptcy. Soon after, the same owners announced that they had bought the parts of the corporate group back from the bankruptcy estate for themselves, and that they would form three new corporate groups out of them: Finlayson & Co, Lexington & Co, and Vallila & Co.

== See also ==
- Finlayson industrial area
- Finlayson (district)
- Näsilinna
- Plevna, Tampere
- Tampella
- Wilhelm von Nottbeck Park
