= Plevna, Tampere =

Building in Tampere, Finland

Coordinates: 61°30′04″N 23°45′30″E

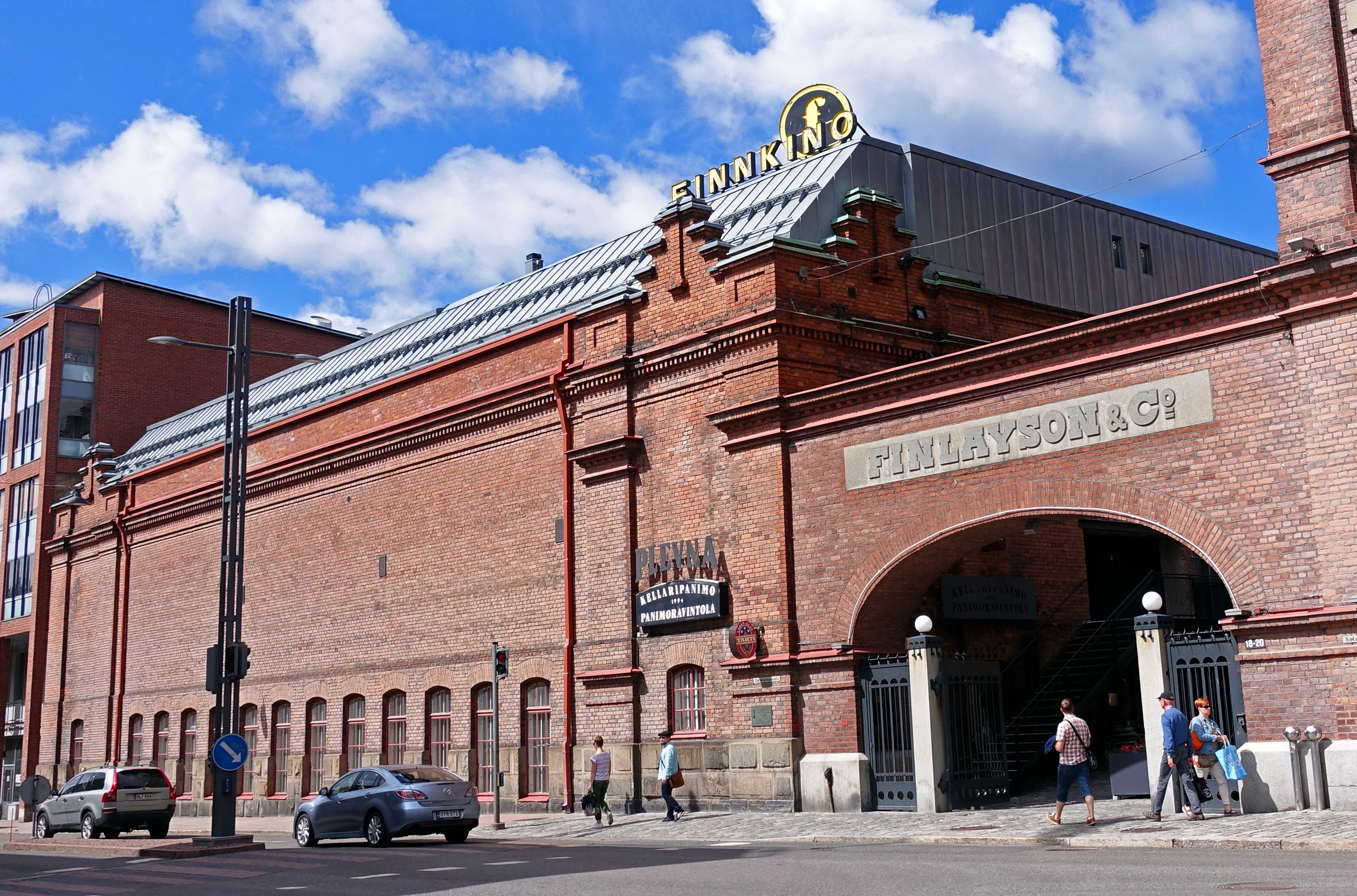
Plevna seen from Satakunnankatu

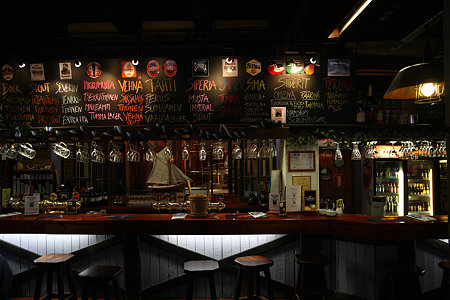
Interior of the brewery restaurant Plevna

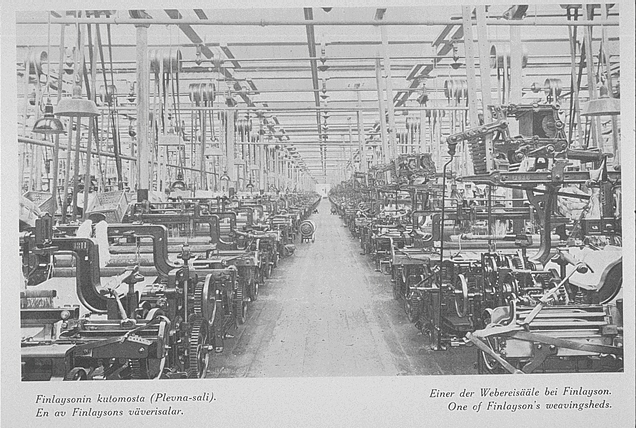
The Plevna hall in 1932

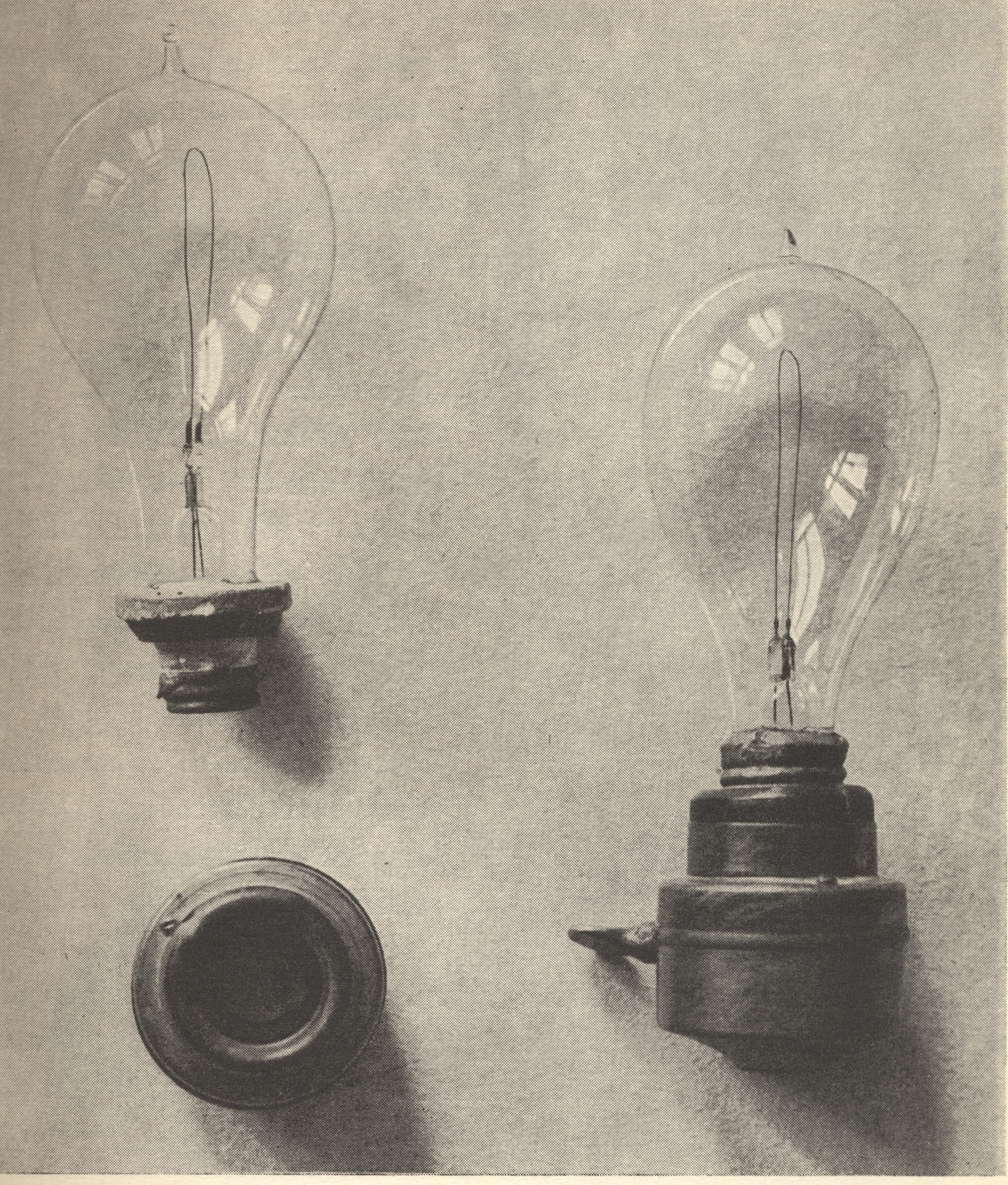
The first electric lights in Finlayson

Plevna is a former industrial building located in the neighbourhood of Finlayson in central Tampere, Finland, hosting a Finnkino movie theatre, the brewery restaurant Plevna and the Koskipanimo microbrewery.

The building was designed by architects Georg Gunliffe and F. L. Calonius for the textile manufacturer Finlayson Oy and built from 1876 to 1877. It housed the largest weaving hall in the Nordic countries upon completion, holding 1200 power looms. The red brick facade lacked windows and the weaving hall was illuminated through the ceiling windows.

Plevna was the first building in the Nordic countries and the Russian Empire (which Finland was part of at the time) to be lit by electric lighting. The Thomas Edison electric light was first used in the building on 15 March 1882. A bridge was built in 1876 between the Plevna and Katuvapriikki buildings, which also served as the main entrance of the factory. The bridge has since been dismantled.

The building is named after the city of Pleven, Bulgaria, and the 1877 siege of Plevna during the Russo-Turkish War, which also involved Finnish soldiers to commemorate it.

== Movie theatre ==
The building currently houses a Finnkino movie theatre which opened in 1999. Finnkino Plevna has 10 auditoriums and 1653 seats, which makes it the largest movie theatre in Finland outside Greater Helsinki.

Plevna is one of the main premises of the annual Tampere Film Festival.

== Restaurant ==
The building also houses the Plevna brewery restaurant, which opened in 1994. The restaurant serves the brewery's own beers as well as those from the Koskipanimo microbrewery next door, and since February 2018 customers have also been able to buy them to go.
