= Näsilinna =

Palace in Tampere, Finland

Coordinates: 61°30′15″N 023°45′12″E

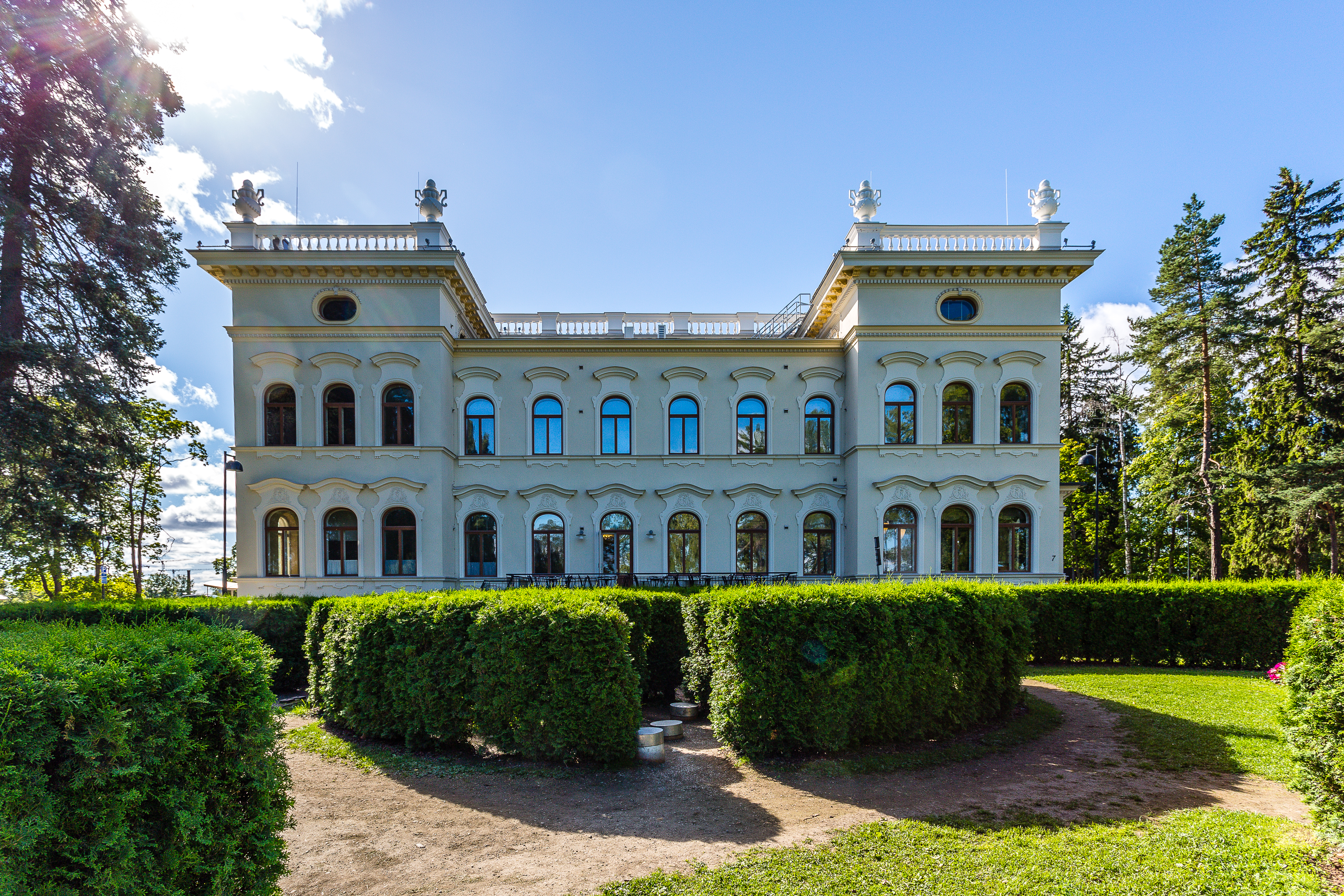
Näsilinna

Näsilinna (Finnish: [ˈnæsiˌlinːɑ]; lit. "Näsi Castle") is a neo-baroque palace on Näsikallio in Tampere, Finland. It was built by Peter von Nottbeck, son of Wilhelm von Nottbeck, a St. Petersburg-based industrial manager of Finlayson. The original name of the palace, completed in 1898, was Milavida. The building was designed by architect Karl August Wrede. The true meaning and history of the name Milavida is unknown.

== History ==
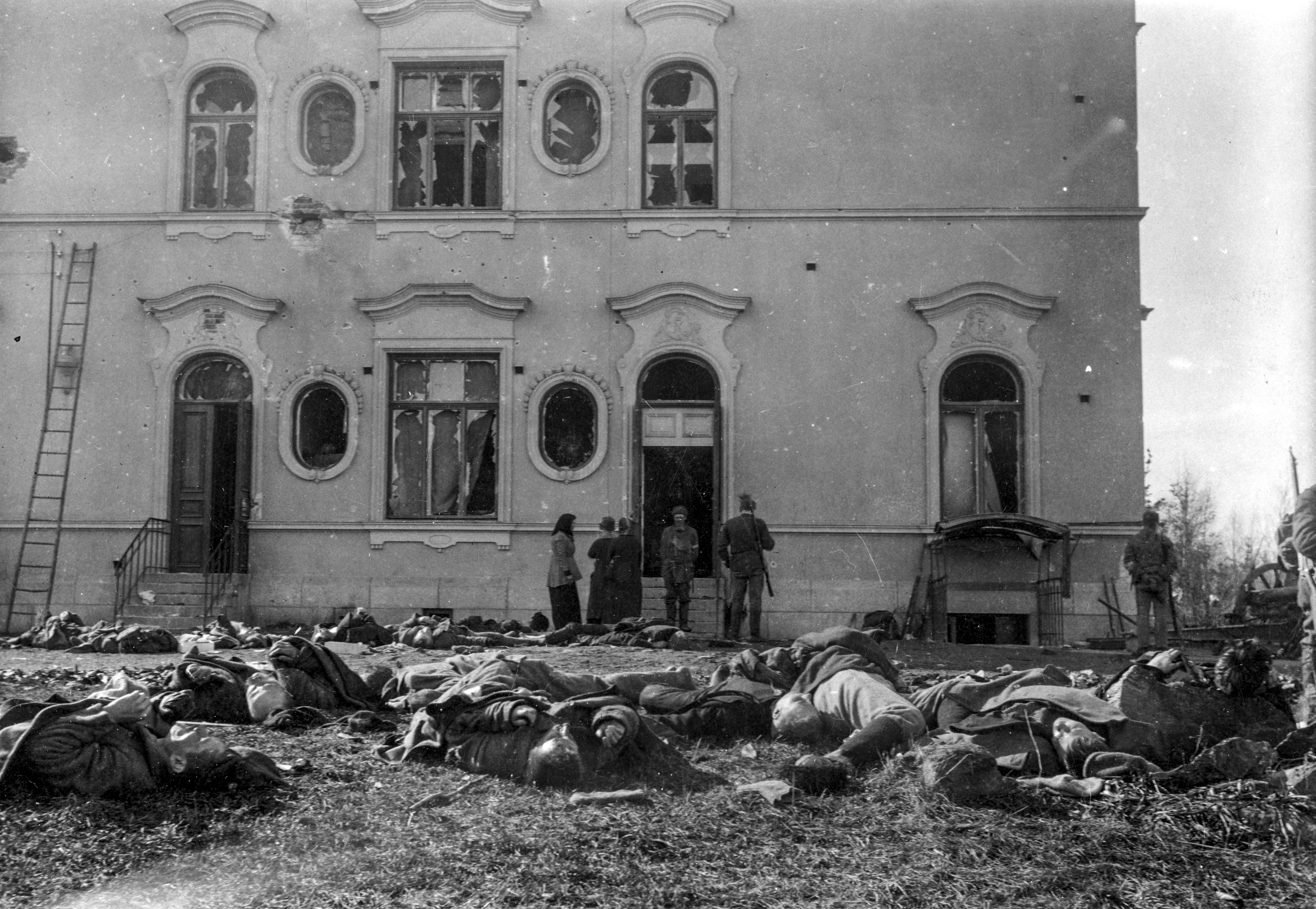
Executed Reds after the Battle of Tampere in 1918

The original Milavida, where von Nottbeck's family lived, was a wooden villa built in 1860 next to Näsikallio. However, the whole family did not have time to live in the new Milavida; only the children lived there for a couple of years with the servants. Peter's wife Olga von Nottbeck died while giving birth to twins in Baden-Baden in October 1898, and six months later Peter himself died after caecal surgery at a Parisian hospital. Edvard von Nottbeck, appointed guardian of the children, sold the palace to the city of Tampere in 1905.

The city changed the name of the palace to Näsilinna, and the Häme Museum was opened in 1908, with Gabriel Engberg as the first museum manager. Engberg also lived in Näsilinna. During the Civil War in 1918, the Red Cross Hospital and the Red Guards base operated in Näsilinna, and the building suffered severe damage during the war. During the battle of Tampere, Näsilinna changed on April 3–4 owner three times. About 4,000 rounds of ammunition hit the building. During the Second World War, the building was inhabited by anti-aircraft forces and the bridge guards of the Pori railway.

The palace served as the Häme Museum from 1908 to 1997. Since 1998, the building, closed for 17 years, has been awaiting renovation. Näsilinna was renovated in 2013–2015. The total cost of the project was €5 million. The halls on the first floor were restored to the spirit of the original von Nottbeck and included a restaurant with halls, a lobby café and a reception area for the museum. On the second floor, the room division from the 1950s was preserved. This floor was used by the Milavida Museum Exhibition Facilities.

== Milavida Museum ==
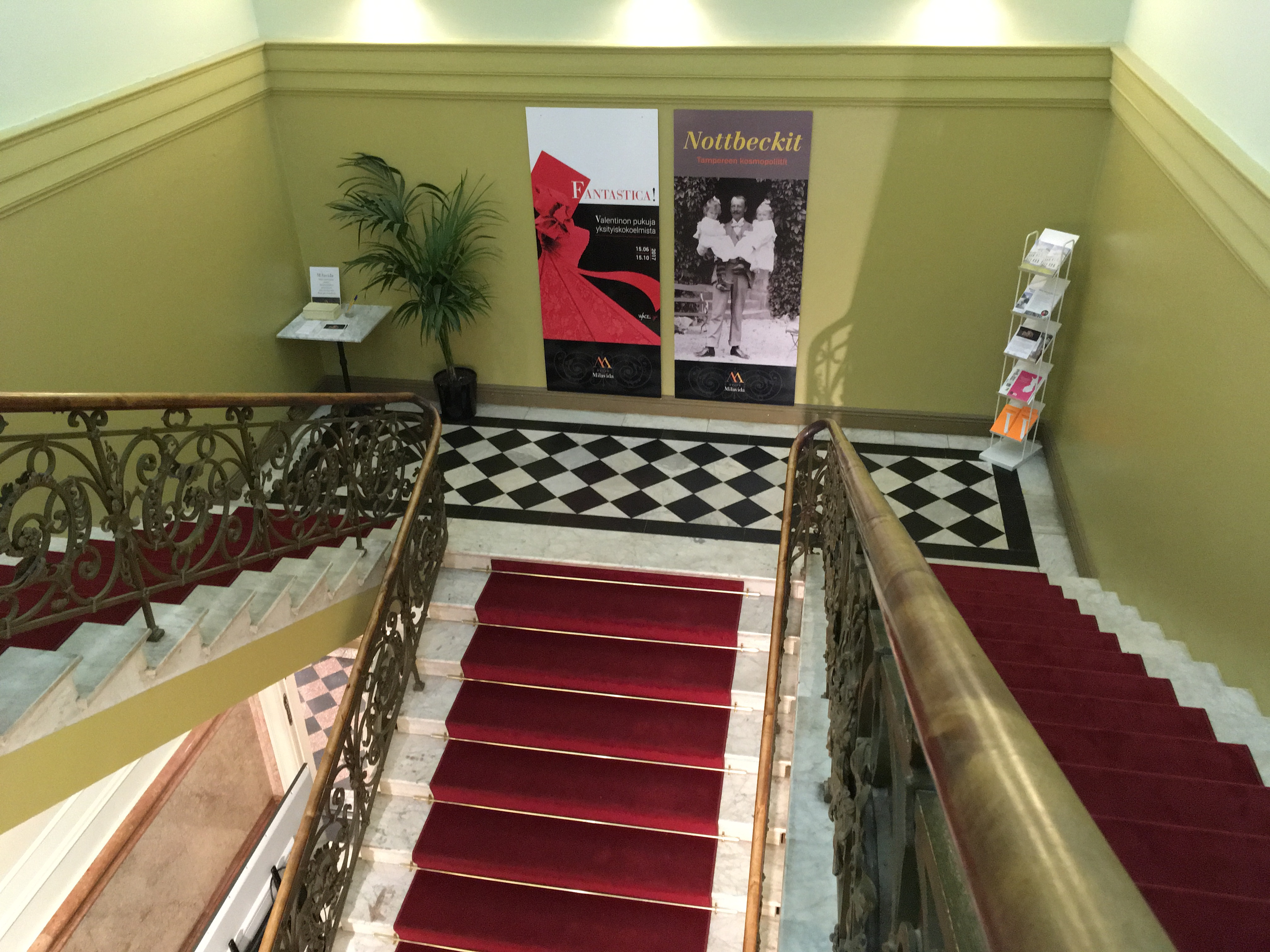
A staircase of the Milavida Museum

The Milavida Museum is a cultural history museum opened in 2015, which operates in Näsilinna. The museum's main exhibition tells the story of von Nottbeck's factory family, which owned Finlayson's cotton mill.

In addition to the main exhibition, Milavida has changing exhibitions, especially on the themes of fashion and design. The museum has seen Salvatore Ferragamo's shoes, Valentino's evening dresses and Timo Sarpaneva's printed fabrics, among others. In 2018, a crown designed for the King of Finland was on display.

The exhibition spaces are located on the second floor of Näsilinna. The Milavida Museum is smaller than the previous Häme Museum, which was located in the building from 1908 to 1998. Milavida also has its own show profile; it is not a general museum like the Häme Museum.

== See also ==
- Näsijärvi
- Näsinneula
