= Juan Sobrino =

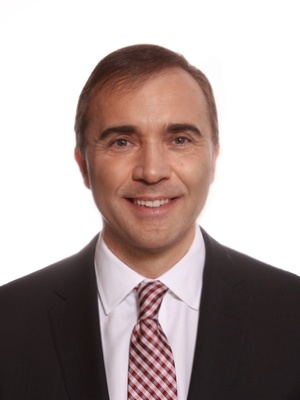
- Education: Technical University of Catalonia
- Engineering career
- Discipline: civil, structural
- Institutions: Polytechnic University of Catalonia, Carnegie Mellon University
- Practice name: Pedelta Structural Engineers

Juan Sobrino is a civil engineer, known internationally for designing more than 400 bridges, introduction of advanced materials in bridges and innovative bridge designs. He is the founder of Pedelta, an international structural engineering firm.

Sobrino was an adjunct professor at Carnegie Mellon University from 2010 to 2012, and a part-time associate professor at Polytechnic University of Catalonia.

== Education ==
Dr. Sobrino studied Civil Engineering at Technical University of Catalonia (UPC), and earned Master of Science in 1990. He went on to pursue a PhD in Civil Engineering. He has been actively involved in sharing his industry experience and research experience with students and young engineers as he is frequently invited as a guest speaker in Civil Engineering departments of universities including Princeton and the University of Notre Dame in Indiana.

== Career ==
Dr. Sobrino founded Pedelta immediately after earning his PhD in 1994. Since then, he has been involved in design of new bridges, as well as assessment and rehabilitation of existing bridges in USA, Canada, Latin America, Europe and Asia.

== Awards ==
- 2003 IABSE (International Association for Bridge & Structural Engineering) award
- 2005 GFRP Lleida Footbridge Awarded with Footbridge Award. Venice, Italy.
- 2012 Innovation award Spain, Spanish Board of Civil Engineers, Valencia, Spain.
- 2012 The Triplets, La Paz, Bolivia awarded with Eugene C.Figg Jr. medal, Pittsburgh, PA, USA.
- 2015 Medal of Professional Merit, Spanish Board of Civil Engineers, Madrid, Spain.

== Innovations ==
Amongst his various innovative bridge designs, his application of use of advance materials has reached international recognition, with completed bridge examples including the first stainless steel vehicular bridge in Menorca, the stainless steel arch pedestrian bridge in Sant Fruitos, the first hybrid stainless steel and GFRP pedestrian bridges of Zumaia and Vilafant, as well as the Abetxuko Bridge, a steel girder/organic form bridge.

== Notable projects ==
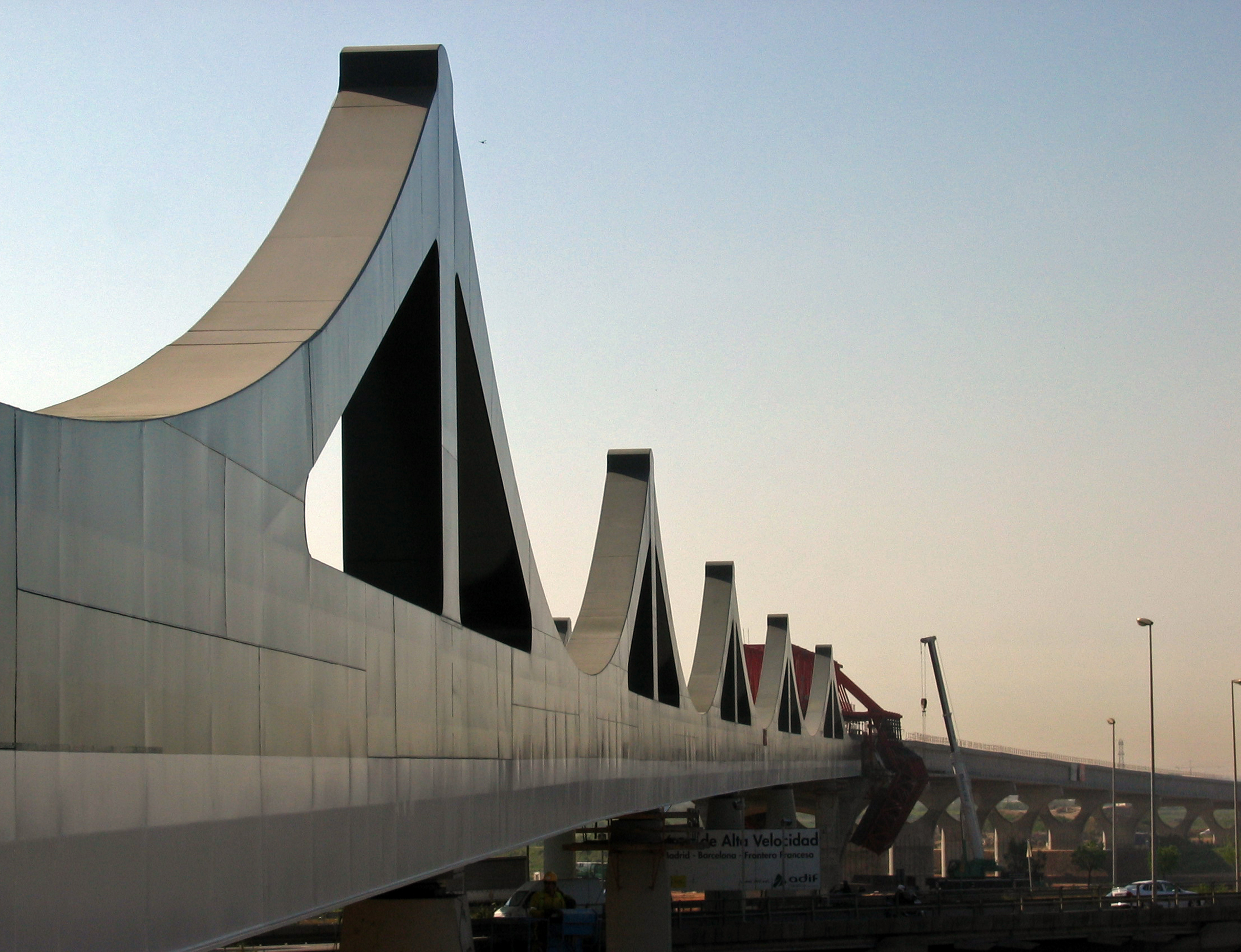
Sant Boi Bridge, Sant Boi, Spain (2005).

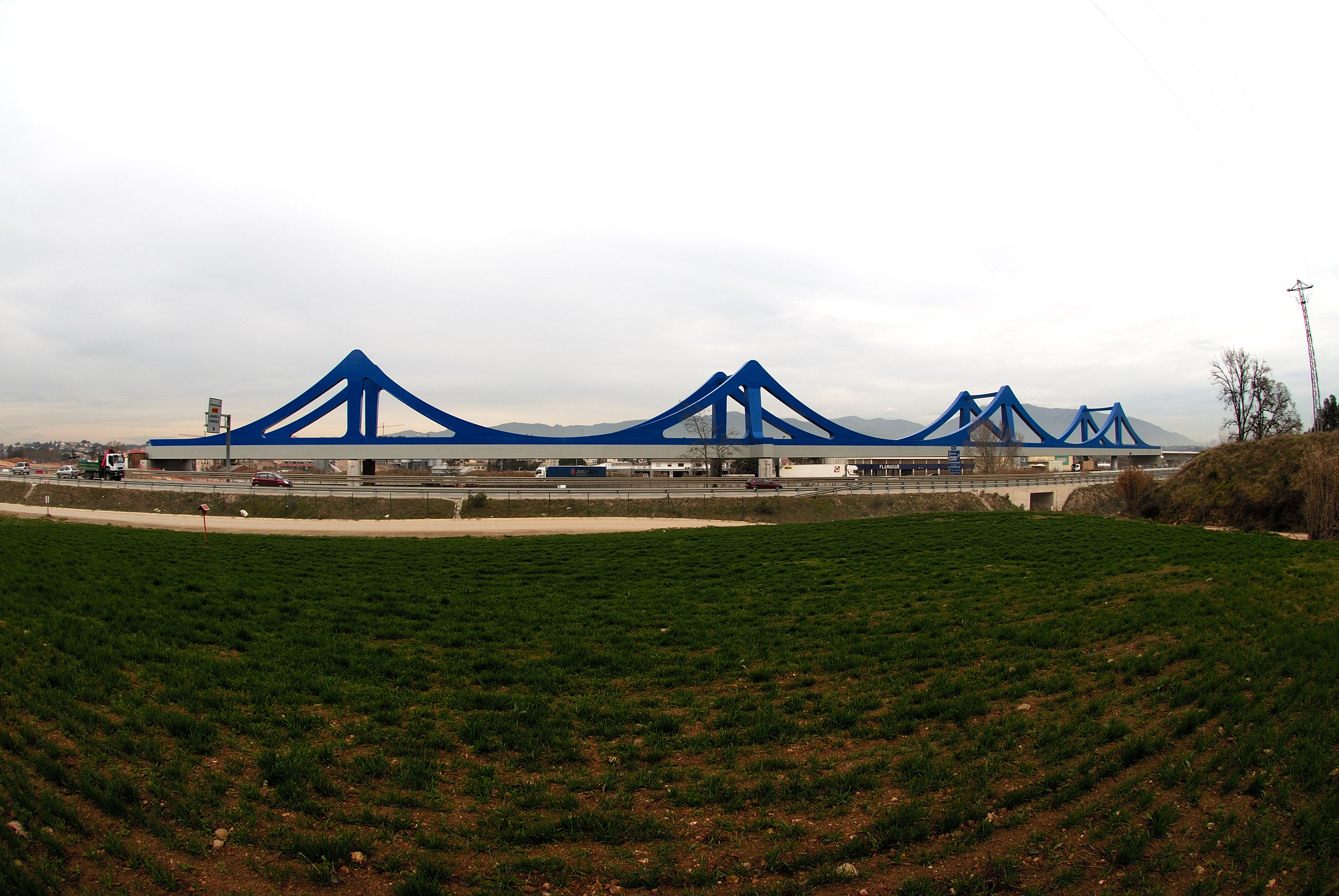
High Speed Railway Bridge over AP7, Llinars del Valles(2007).

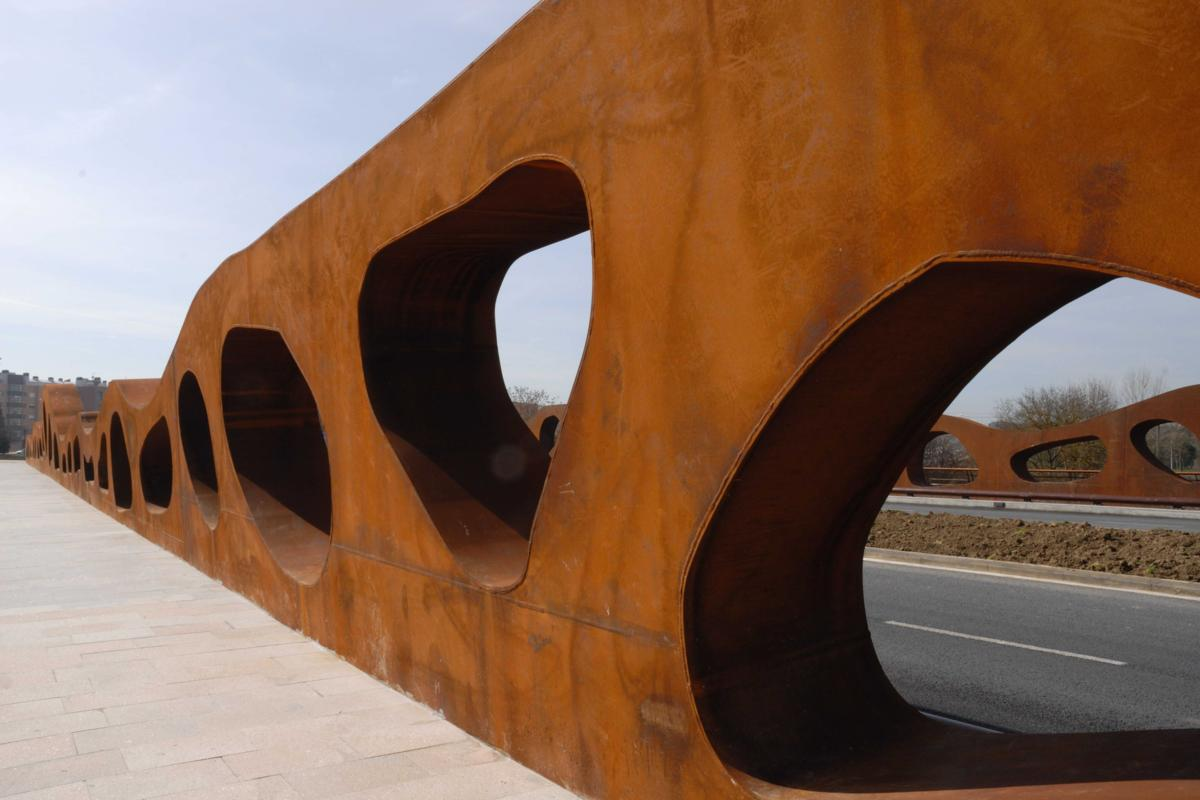
Abetxuko Bridge, Vitoria, Spain(2005).

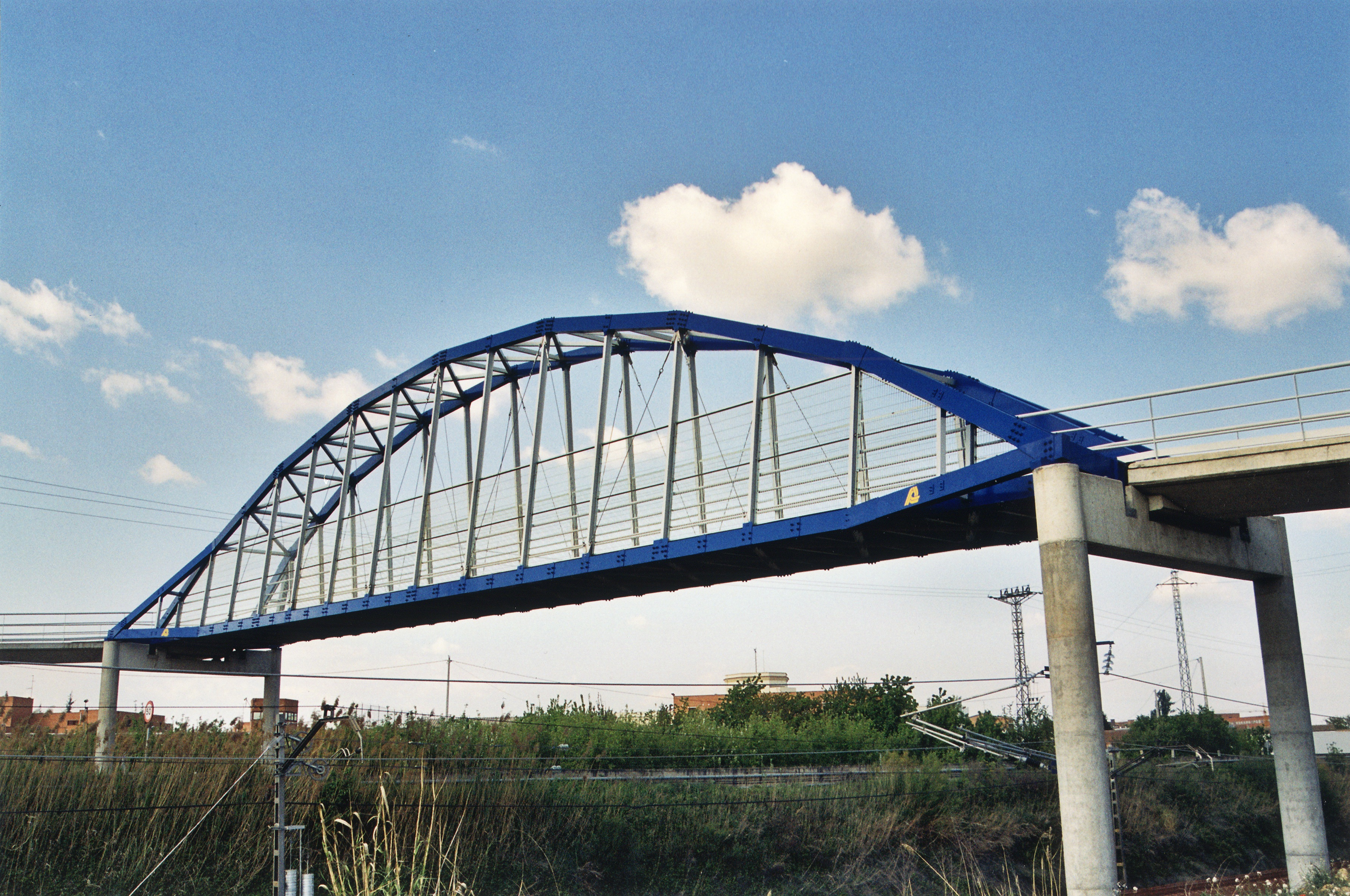
GFRP Lleida footbridge, Lleida, Spain(2001).

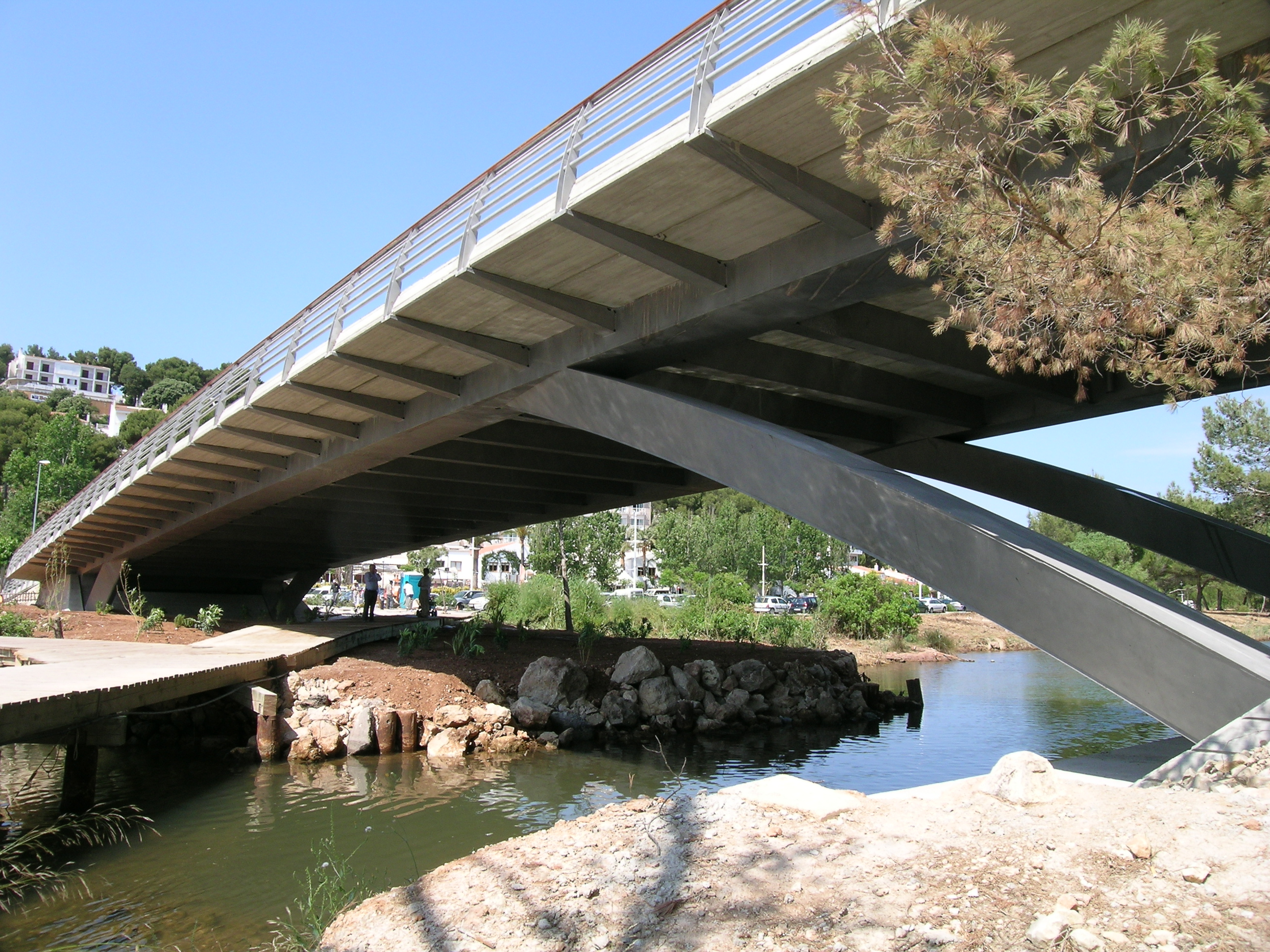
Cala Galdana Bridge (First Stainless Steel Vehicular bridge), Menorca, Spain(2004).

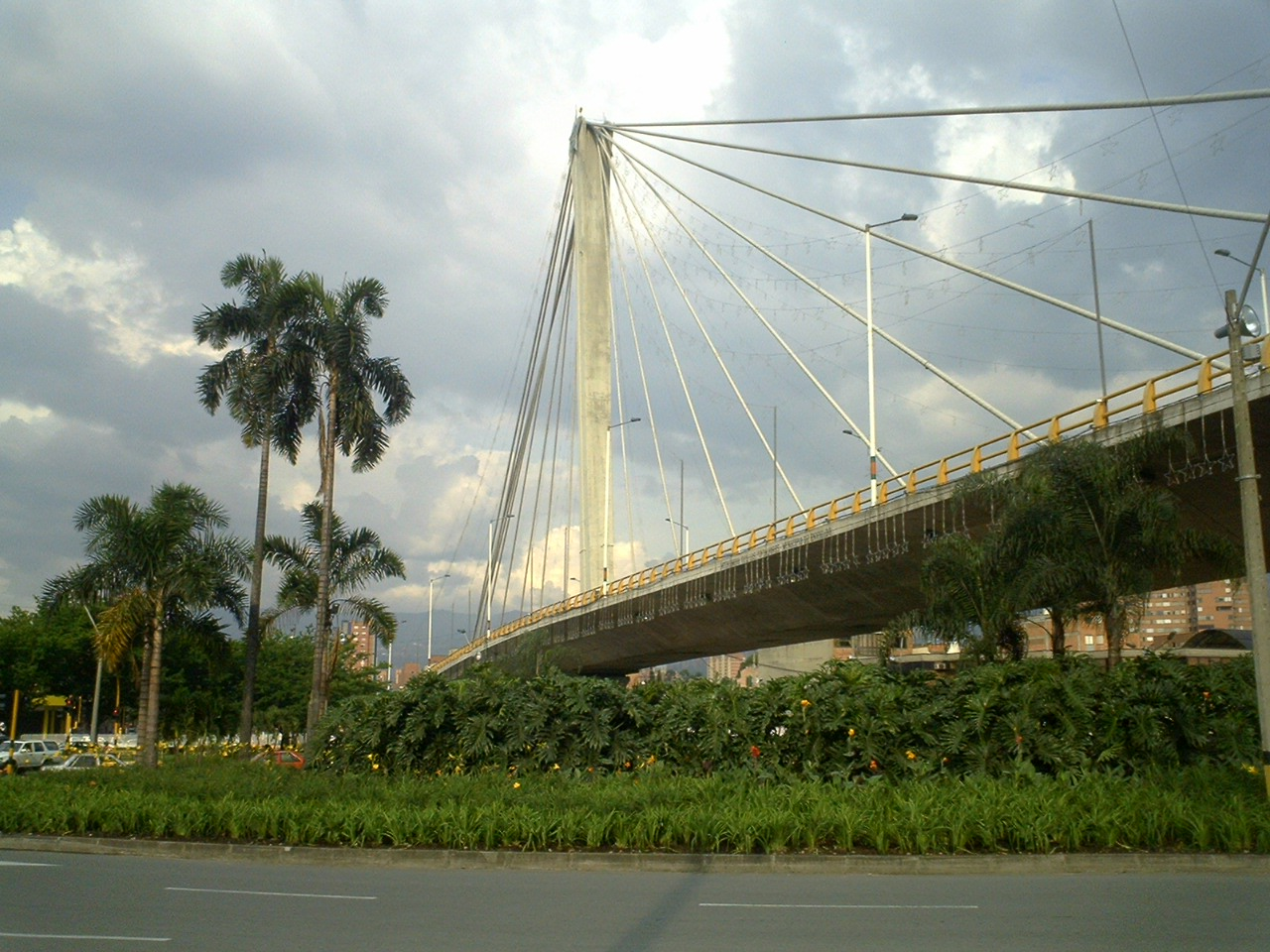
Envigado bridge, Envigado, Colombia (2004).

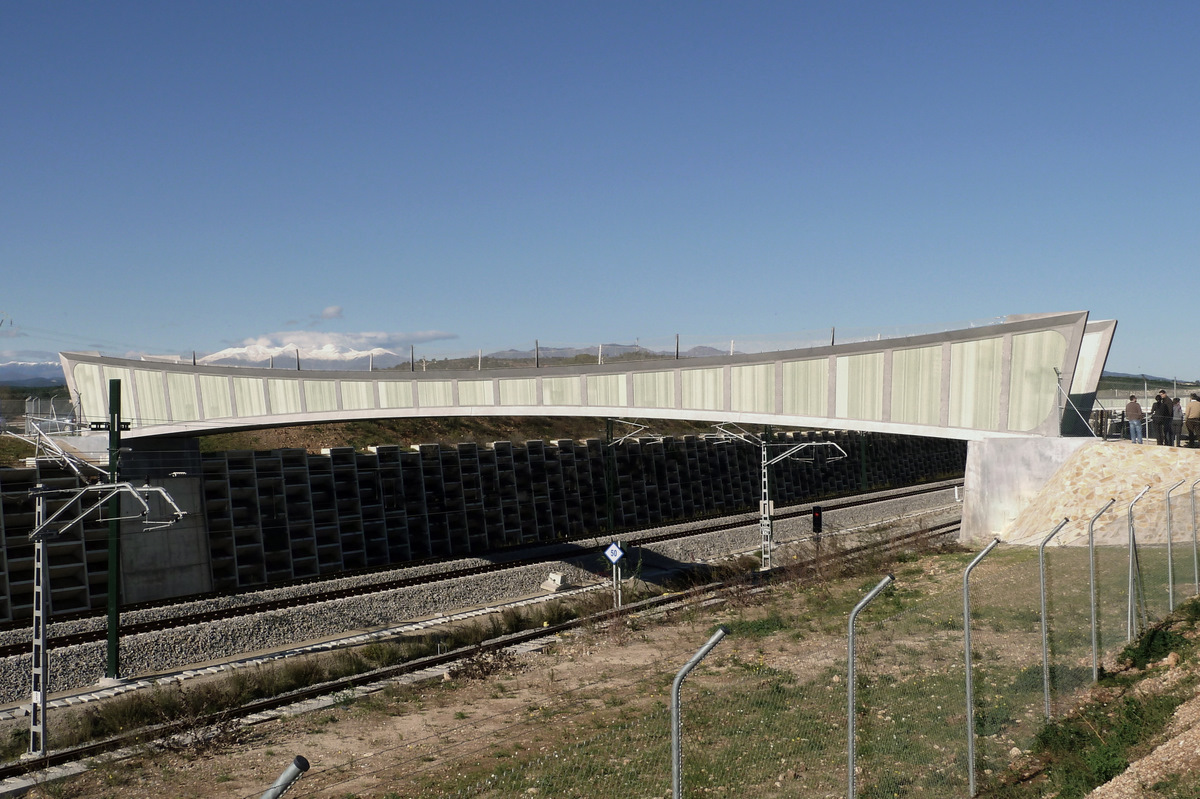
Vilafant Bridge, Vilafant, Spain (2011).

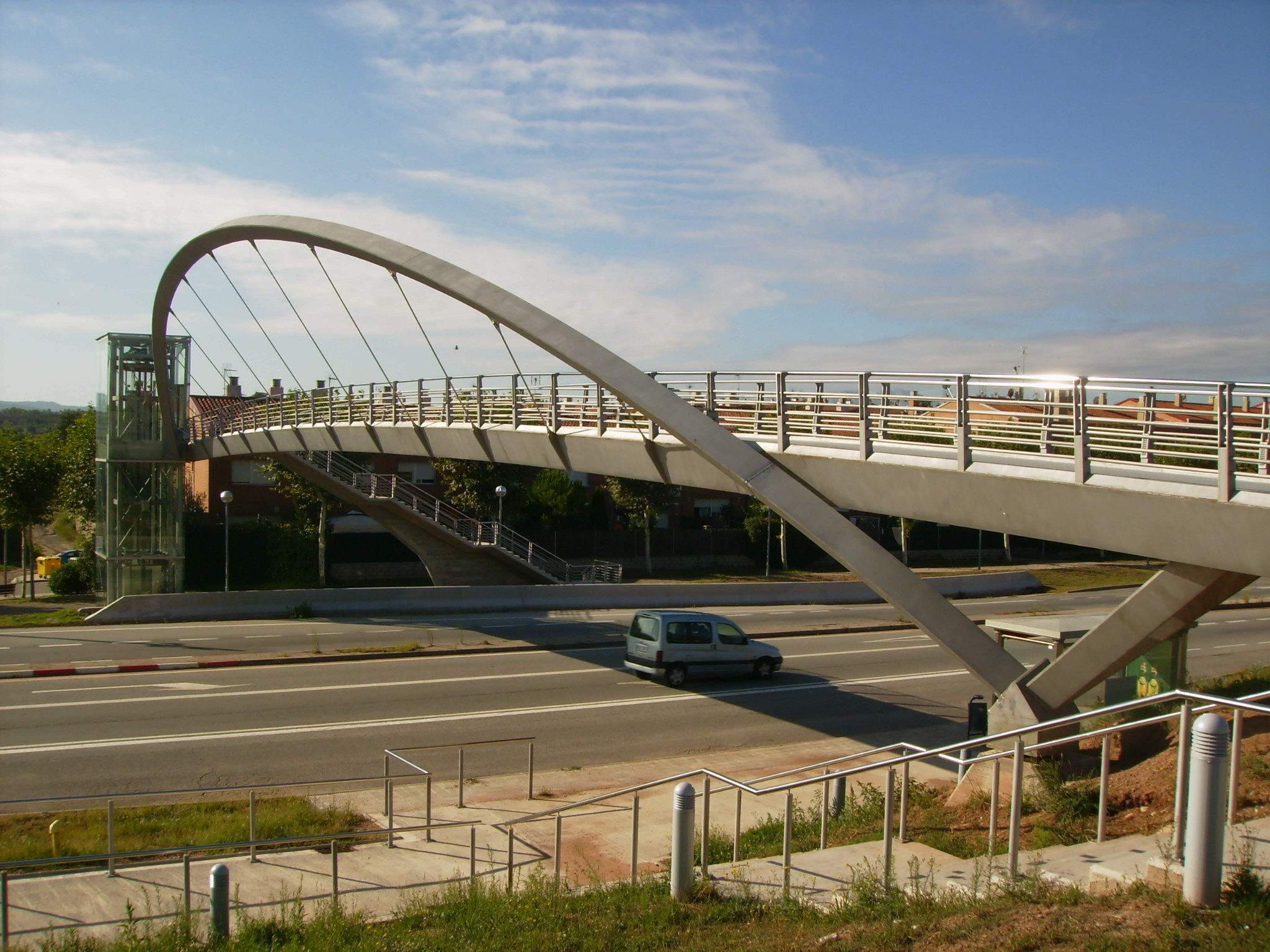
Sant Fruitós, Spain (2009)

== See also ==
- Cala Galdana Bridge
- Abetxuko Bridge
- GFRP Lleida Pedestrian Bridge
