= Envigado bridge =

Los Fundadores Bridge
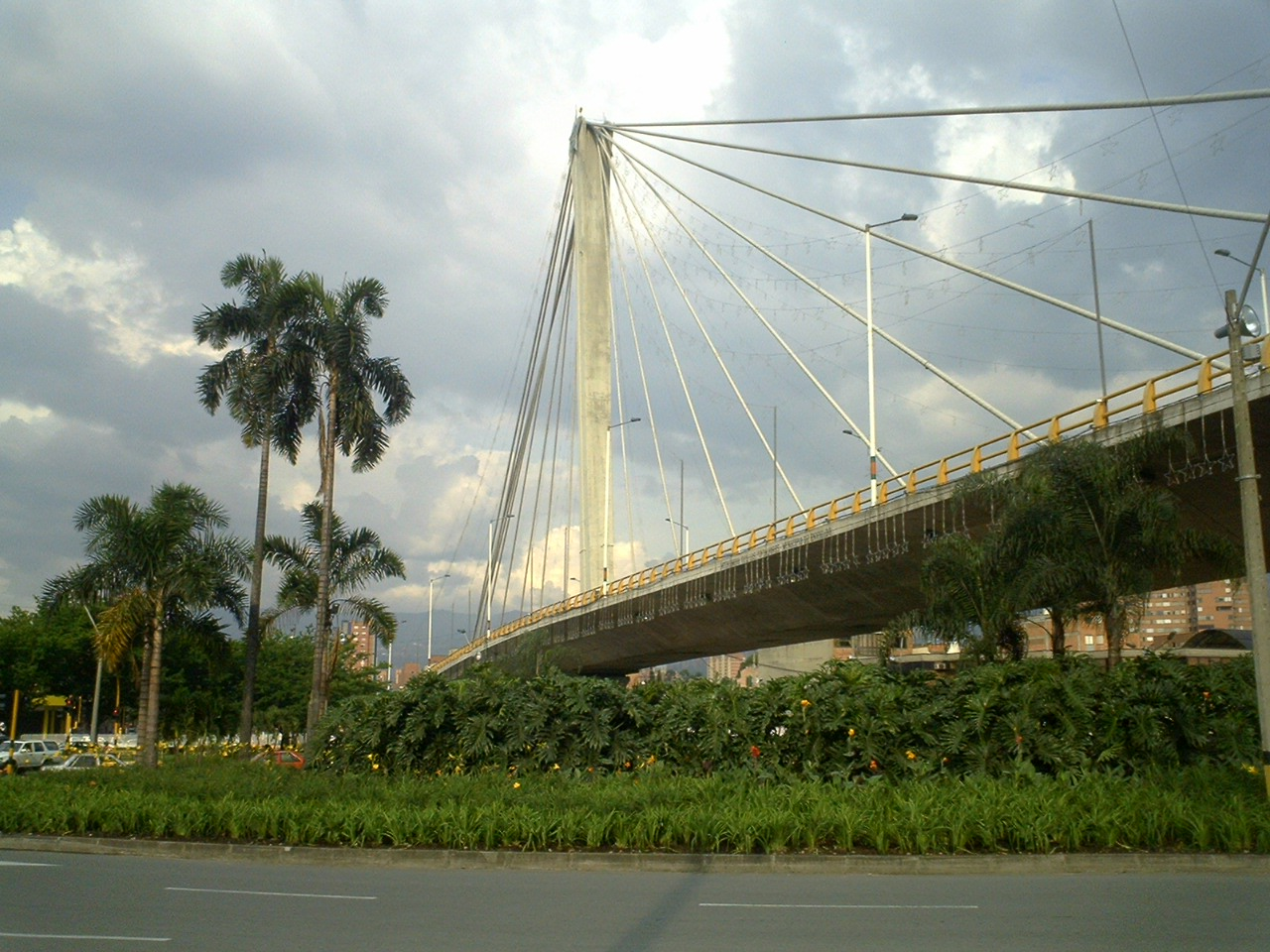
- Bridge view
- Coordinates: 6.173569°N 75.592504°W
- Carries: Motor vehicles
- Crosses: 37 S
- Locale: Envigado, Antioquia, Colombia
- Official name: Puente Los Fundadores
- Maintained by: Envigado Municipality

Characteristics
- Design: cable-stayed bridge
- Material: Concrete
- Total length: 242 metres (794 ft)
- Width: 18.6 metres (61 ft)
- Longest span: 121 metres (397 ft)
- No. of spans: 3

History
- Designer: Pedelta Structural Engineers
- Engineering design by: Juan Sobrino and Leonard Rosillo
- Opened: 2006

The Los Fundadores Bridge (Spanish: Intercambio Vial Los Fundadores), also known as the Peldar Bridge because of its location, is a concrete cable-stayed bridge in Envigado, Colombia. The bridge carries Las Vegas Avenue and crosses 37th Street.

The construction of the bridge was also central to the regeneration plan for the neighborhood. This bridge was conceived as representation of the effort and persistence of the community to overcome the convulsed situation that prevailed in the country at the time of construction. The municipality faced with the challenge to build a road connection in the Las Vegas Avenue, decided to design a bridge of exceptional character, a landmark.

== Description ==
The bridge has three approached spans of 20.2 m length each and two cable-stayed spans of 121 and 60 m. The two main spans are supported by central stays continuous through a steel saddle on top of the tower. All stays converge at the top of the tower as a fan configuration, being one of the few cable-stayed bridges with this cable-stay arrangement.

The deck plan is mostly straight with a constant width of 18.6 meters. The deck is a 2.4 m depth tri-cellular concrete box girder and it is suspended by the cable-stays spaced at 12 m. The deck is internally post-tensioned with longitudinal and transverse tendons.

The 50 m high central tower is a reinforced concrete tower with a rectangular cross section and variable width in both directions. The pylon is inclined 5° to achieve a more dynamic visual experience and landmark character.

The bridge is located in a seismic zone of average degree in Colombia, having calculated for an earthquake spectrum with a maxima acceleration of 5m/s2.

The total cost of the structure was approximately US$12 million.

== Construction ==
Construction of the bridge began in 2001, and was successfully completed in July 2003. At the time of construction, the bridge was the second largest concrete cable-stayed bridge in Colombia.
