= Maristes footbridge, Lleida =

Maristes Footbridge
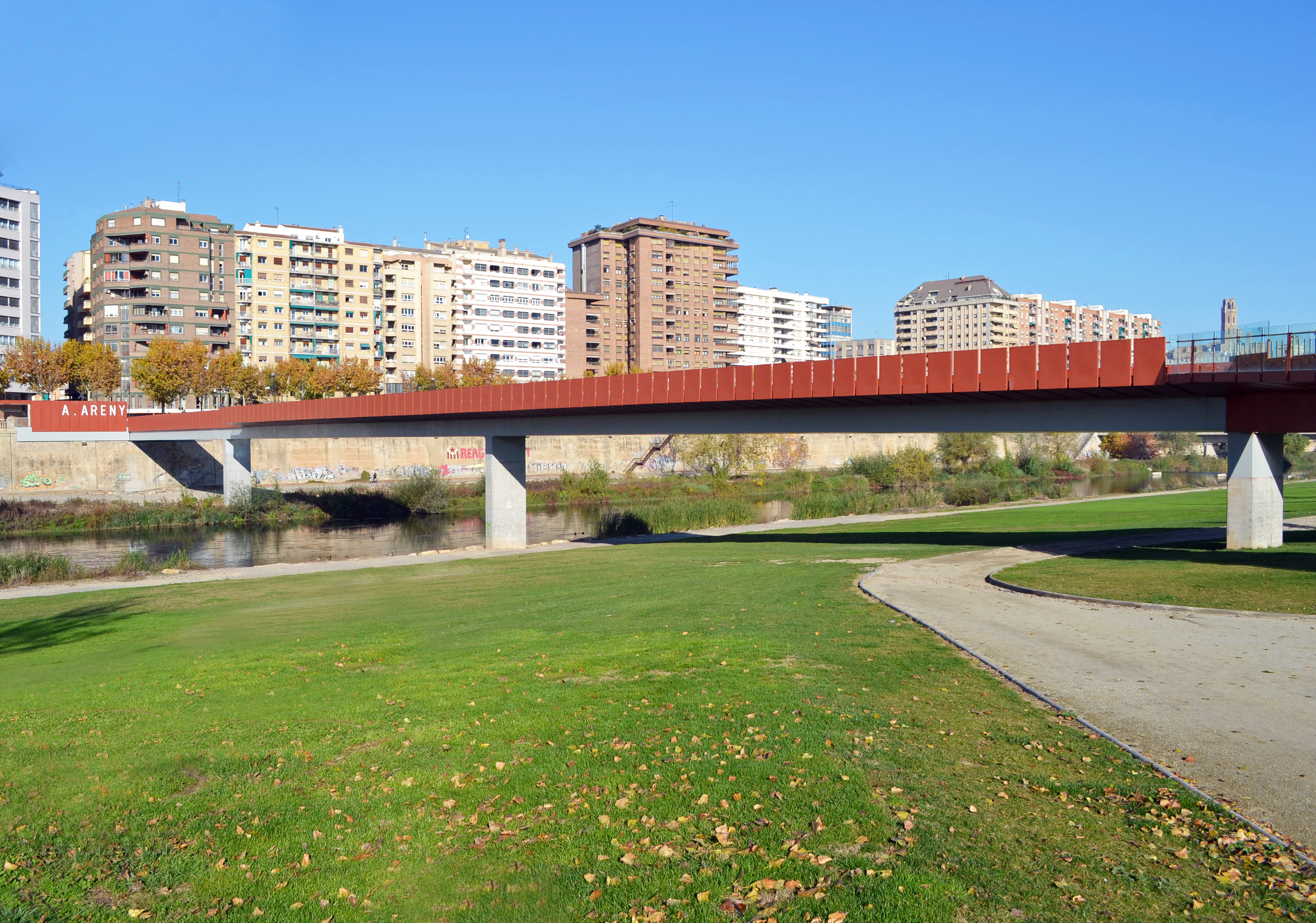
- View of the bridge
- Coordinates: 41°36′30″N 0°37′17″E
- Carries: Pedestrians
- Crosses: Segre River
- Locale: Lleida, Catalonia, Spain
- Owner: Lleida Municipality
- Maintained by: Lleida Municipality

Characteristics
- Material: Steel box girder, GFRP translucent deck panels

History
- Designer: Pedelta Structural Engineers
- Opened: 2010

Location
- Interactive map of Maristes Footbridge

The Maristes footbridge is a bridge in Lleida, Catalonia, Spain. In 2000, the Lleida City Council organized an open competition for a new pedestrian bridge. The structure is located near the entrance to the university campus and serves as both a pedestrian route and a public gathering space.

== Description ==
The bridge consists of four spans supported by three slender reinforced concrete piers. The abutments are connected to the existing walls, creating an integral bridge without expansion joints at the piers. Translucent composite materials, specifically glass fiber reinforced polymer (GFRP), were used for the structural floor panels and the railings.

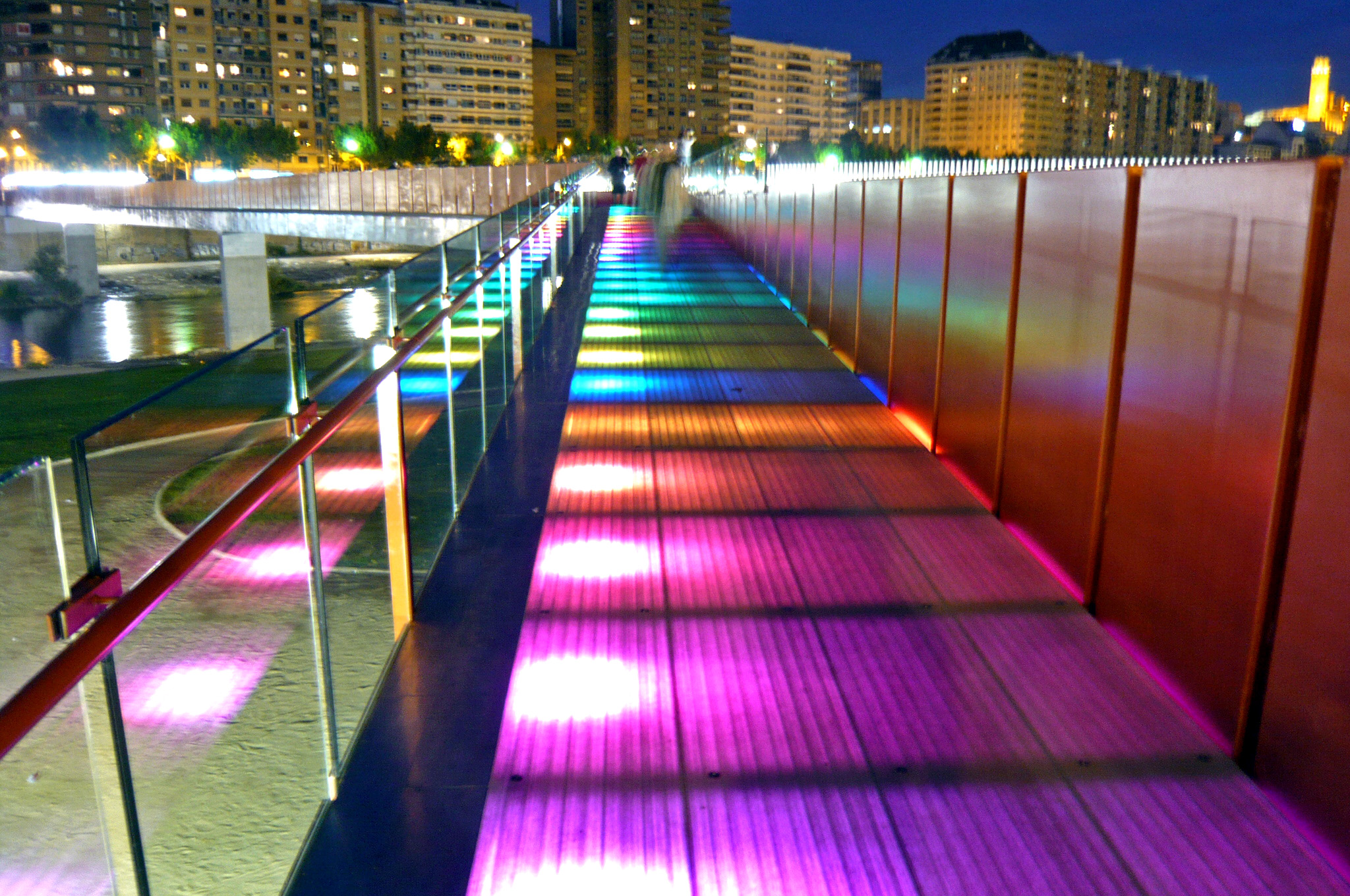
Translucent composite materials used for the bridge deck

== Construction ==
The structure features a double composite action design. A steel box girder was assembled on-site using temporary supports in the river.
