= Sant Boi Bridge =

Sant Boi Bridge over Llobregat River
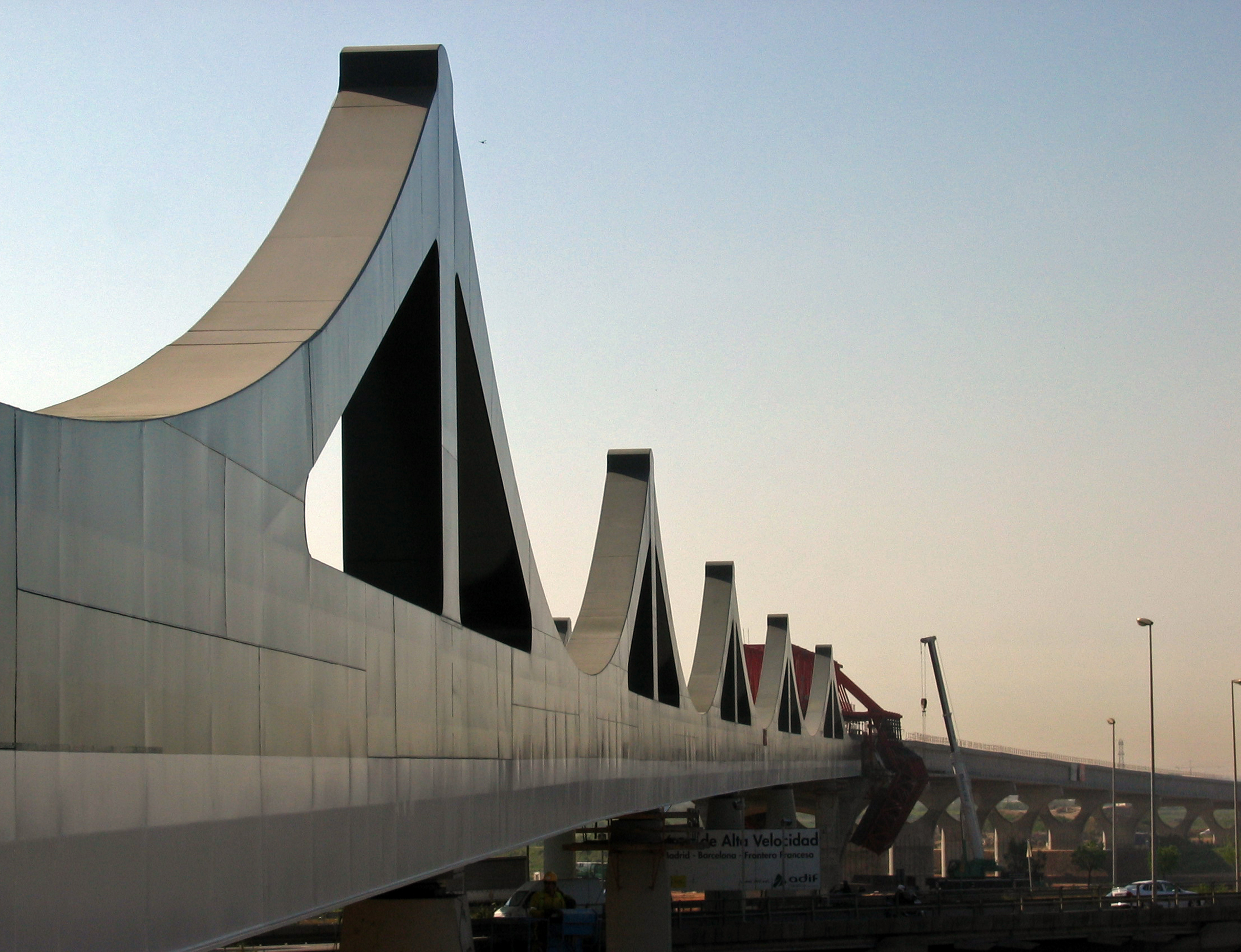
- Bridge view
- Coordinates: 41°20′59″N 2°03′14″E
- Carries: High Speed Railway
- Crosses: Llobregat River, highway, road and railway.
- Locale: Sant Boi de Llobregat, Catalonia, Spain
- Owner: ADIF

Characteristics
- Total length: 2,854 feet (870 m)
- Height: 39 feet (12 m)

History
- Designer: Pedelta Structural Engineers
- Construction end: 2006
- Opened: 2006

Location
- Interactive map of Sant Boi Bridge over Llobregat River

The Sant Boi Bridge is the first steel structure in the high-speed railway joining the city of Madrid and Barcelona.

The 2,854-foot-long (870 m) bridge is very close to the international airport of Barcelona. This high-speed railway viaduct is in concept similar to Llinars del Vallès Bridge but with a different geometry, is a combination of feasibility, technology, aesthetics and integration in the territory.

The bridge crosses several existing infrastructures (highway, road and railway). The bridge is about 15 km from Barcelona.

== Description ==
The proposed viaduct consists of two distinct sections:

- Stretch with board-mixed concrete steel between PK 100 +469,155 +129,155 100, with a total length of 340 m which is constructed by pushing panel lintel.
- Tranche with prestressed concrete deck between PK 100 +999,155 +469,155 100, with a total length of 530 m with a board built by autocimbra vain vain.

Due to the proximity to Sants station, the design speed adopted for calculating plot settings are 150 km / h speed limit to 80 km / h minimum speed. The slope adopted maximum elevation is 25 thousandths. The colour of the bridge was red at first, but Adif decided to use green corporate color, to make it better integrated into the environment.

The steel bridge was built using the launching method. The composite concrete–steel deck consists of 3 ft (1 m) deep parallel transverse I-beams spaced 9 ft (3 m) apart. Longitudinal beams are suspended from curved tied steel box members supported from 37 ft (11.5 m) height steel pylons.

The second 1738 ft (530 m) section, which passes over the Llobregat River, consists of a continuous pre-stressed concrete bridge with a maximum span of 164 ft (50 m). This second section was constructed using regular cast in place concrete method and launching formwork.

The bridges have been modeled using a computer program based on finite element analysis. Special attention has been given to the structural behavior of the bridge under different types of high speed trains crossing the bridge with speeds ranging from 150 km/h to 420 km/h according to Eurocode 1. The maximum acceleration obtained under these high speed moving loads is about 1.8 m/s2 lower than the admissible value according to Eurocode 1. A significant horizontal load due to braking and traction of 7000 KN has conditioned the design of the fixed support at one of the extremes.

== Construction ==
The construction method is to mount the metal structure in one end and then pushing the part already fitted to their final location. The bridge is the first steel bridge for the high-speed rail line between Madrid and Barcelona. High-speed rail bridges are complex structures that meet strict provisions related with the dynamic behavior and rail-track interaction.
