= Pedelta Structural Engineers =

Multinational consultant firm

PEDELTA
- Type: Private
- Industry: Civil Engineering / Bridge Engineering
- Founded: 1994 by Juan Sobrino
- Number of locations: Barcelona, Bogotá, Madrid, Miami, Panama, Toronto, Lima
- Key people: Juan Sobrino (President); Javier Jordán (Director-Spain); Leonardo Rosillo (Director-Colombia)
- Number of employees: Approximately 130
- Website: www.pedelta.com

PEDELTA is an independent multinational consultant firm headquartered in Barcelona, Spain which provides worldwide bridge and structural engineering services. The company is present in Canada, Colombia, Panama, Peru, Spain and the United States. The firm is internationally recognized by the introduction of advanced materials on bridges such as Cala Galdana Bridge, the first duplex stainless steel bridge, the GFRP Lleida Pedestrian Bridge, its innovative bridge aesthetics such as the Abetxuko Bridge and other cable supported structures.

== History ==
The company was founded in Barcelona, (Spain) by Juan Sobrino in 1994 focus on bridge and structural design. The firm expanded to Colombia in 2001, the US in 2006, Canada in 2012 and Peru in 2013. In 2017 they started their geotechnical department in Colombia.

== Introduction of advanced materials ==
PEDELTA is worldwide known for the introduction of GFRP and Stainless Steel as a main structural materials on bridges and building structures.

The firm has developed the first hybrid structures combining Stainless-Steel and GFRP profiles and panels. First application is Zumaia pedestrian bridge(2008)and Vilafant Pedestrian Bridges (2011).

== International Awards ==
PEDELTA has received various awards including the following:

- 2012 E. Figg Medal Award for The triplets bridges. International Bridge Conference. Pittsburgh, PA.
- 2012 National Engineering Award. Tunnel of Cune, Colombia.
- 2005 Footbridge Awards to the GFRP Lleida Pedestrian Bridge, Venize.
- 2004 Envigado bridge National Engineering Award of the Colombian Society of Engineering.
- 2003 Juan Sobrino recipient of the IABSE Award.
- 2001 Juan Sobrino recipient of the Award of the Association of Young Entrepreneurs of Catalonia.

== Signature bridge projects ==
Road Bridges

- Abetxuko Bridge, Vitoria, Spain.
- Envigado bridge, Envigado, Colombia.
- Cala Galdana Bridge, Minorca, Spain.
- The triplets bridges, La Paz, Bolivia.

High-Speed Rail Bridges

- Sant Boi Bridge, over LLobregat River.
- High Speed Railway Bridge over AP7, Llinars del Valles

Pedestrian Bridges

- GFRP Lleida Pedestrian Bridge, Lleida, Spain
- Stainless Steel Pedestrian Bridge, Sant Fruitós, Spain.
- Hybrid Stainless Steel-GFRP Pedestrian Bridge, Zumaia, Spain.
- Pedestrian Bridge over Segre River, Lleida, Spain
- Pedestrian Bridge over Oria River, Andoain, Spain
- Vilafant Bridge, Spain
- Fort York Bridge, Toronto, Canada
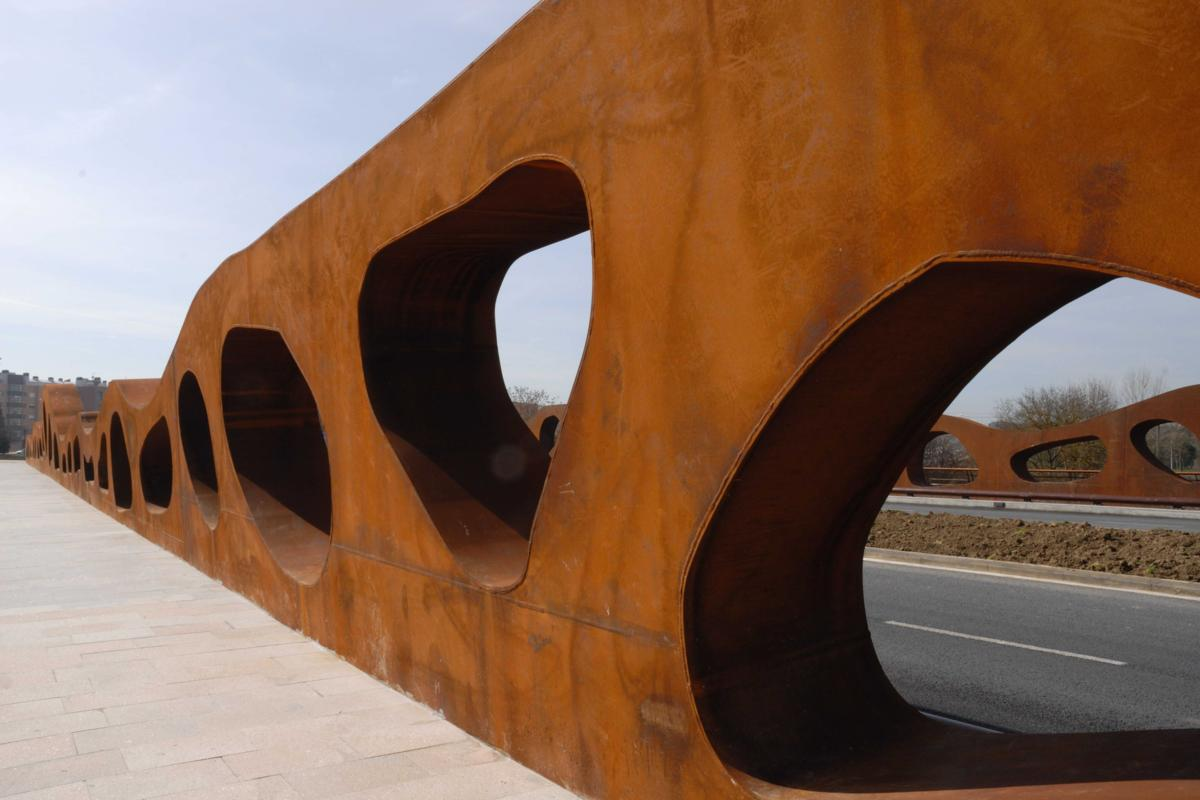
Abetxuko Bridge in Vitoria, Spain

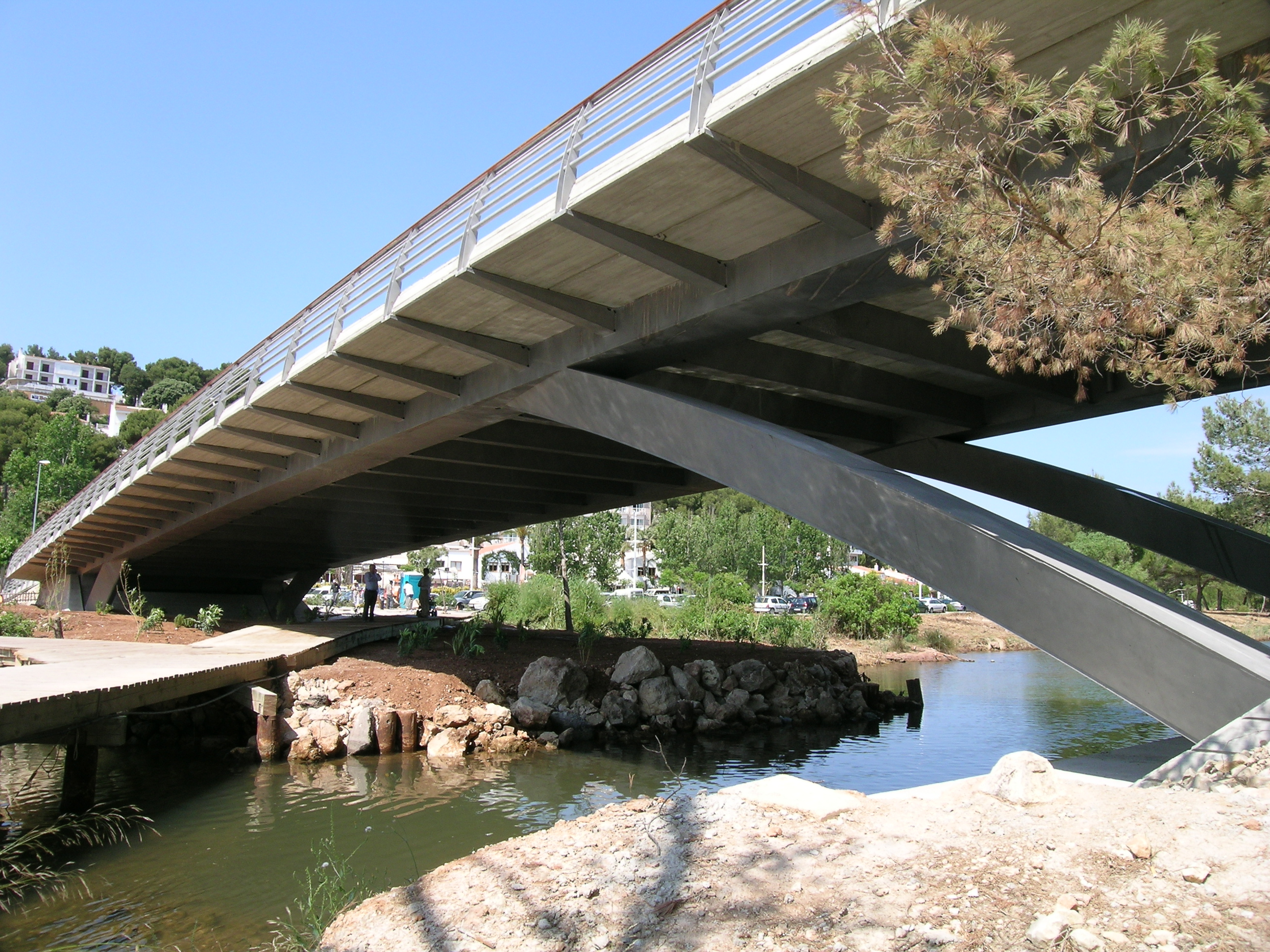
Stainless Steel Bridge in Cala Galdana, Minorca, Spain

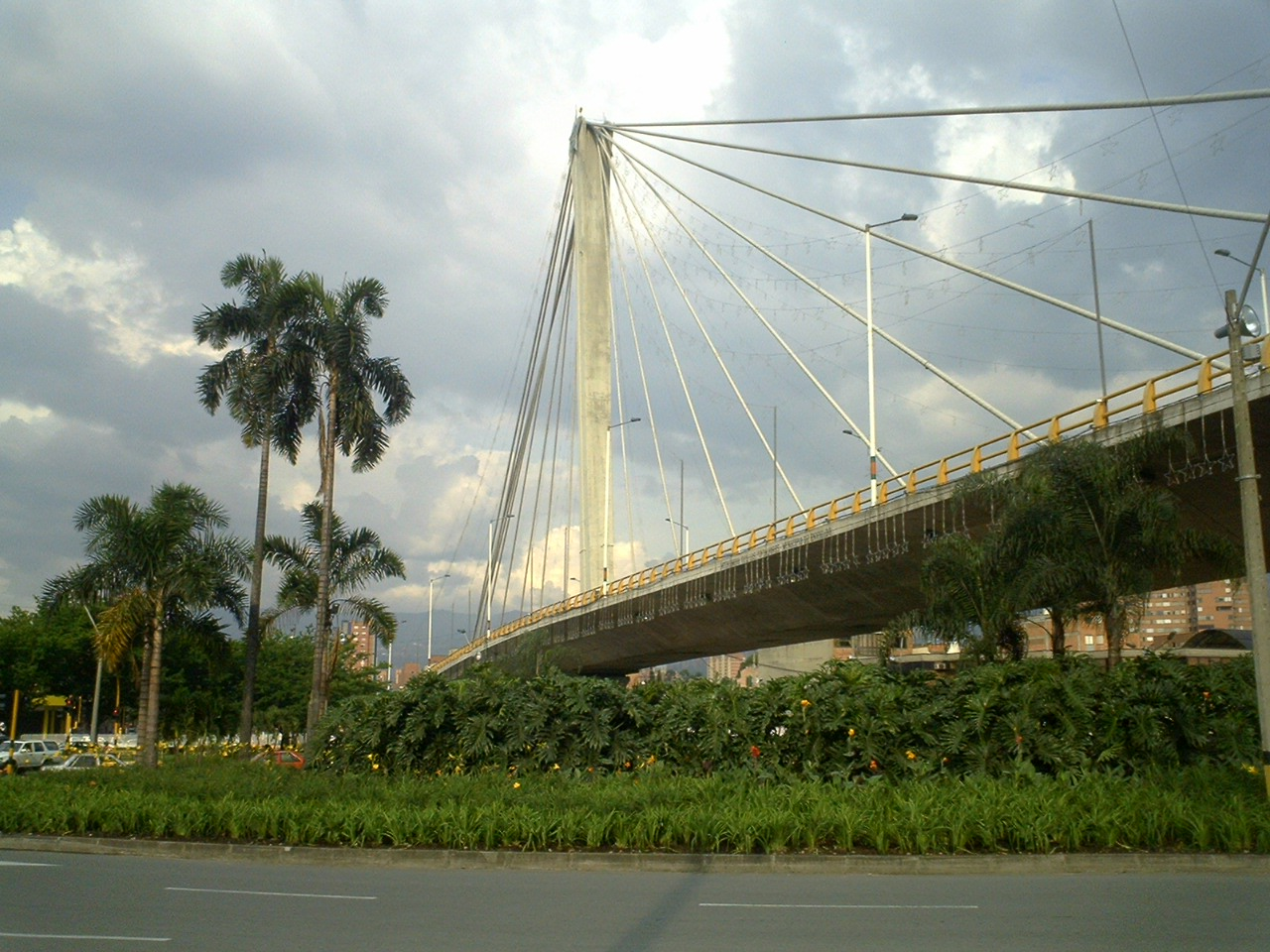
Envigado Bridge(2001).

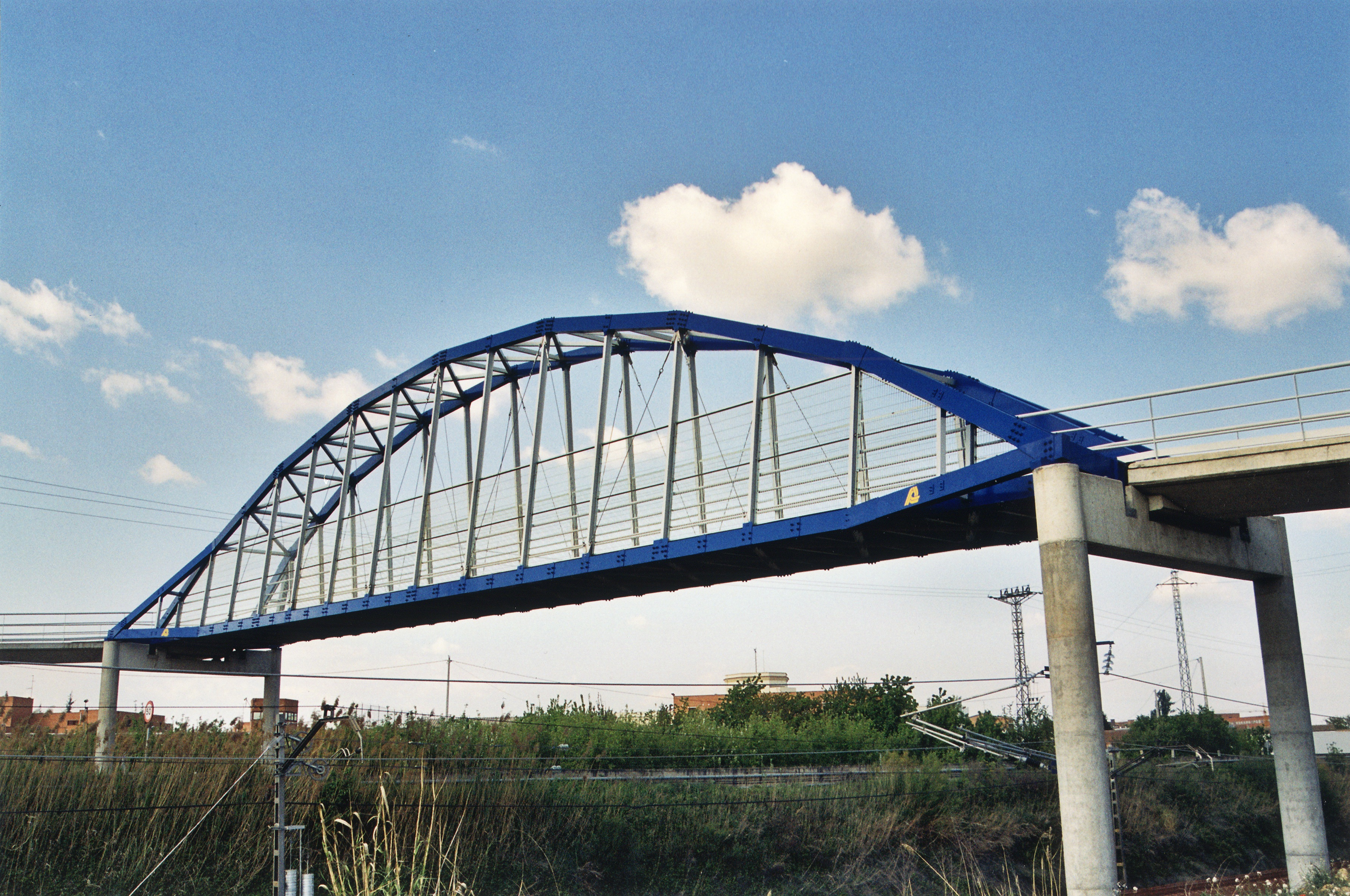
Lleida GFRP Pedestrian Bridge(2001).

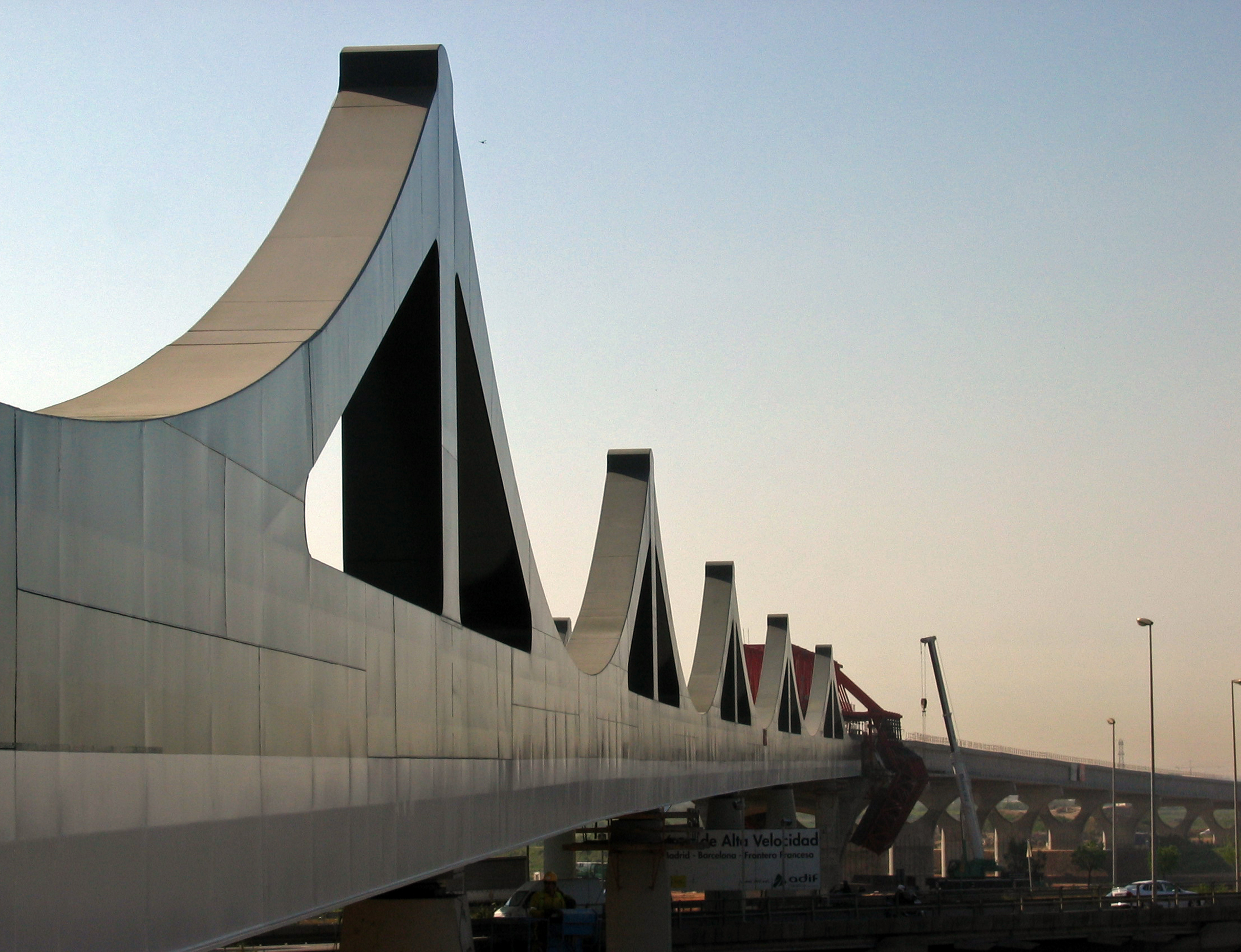
Sant Boi HSR Bridge.

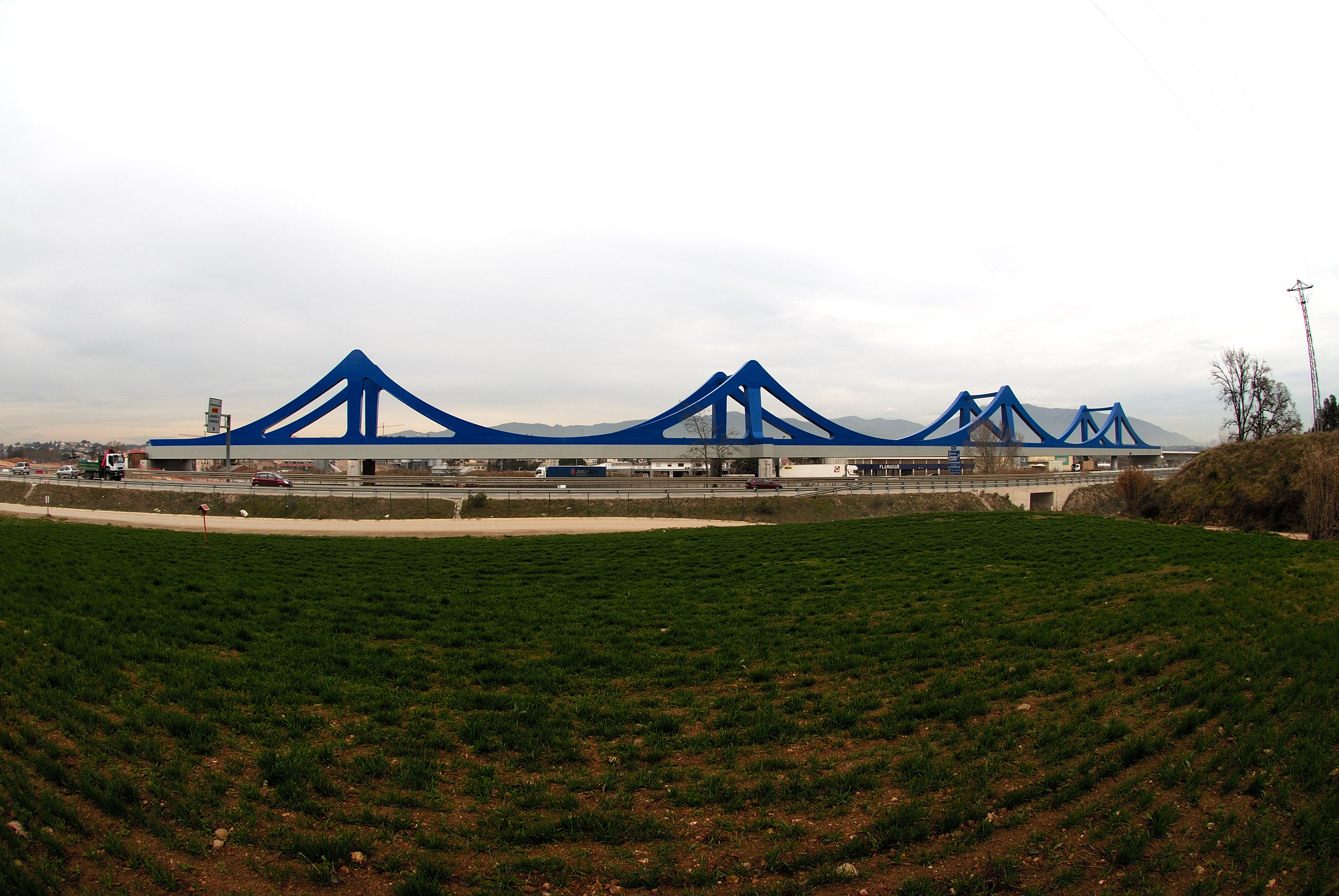
High Speed Railway Bridge in Llinars.

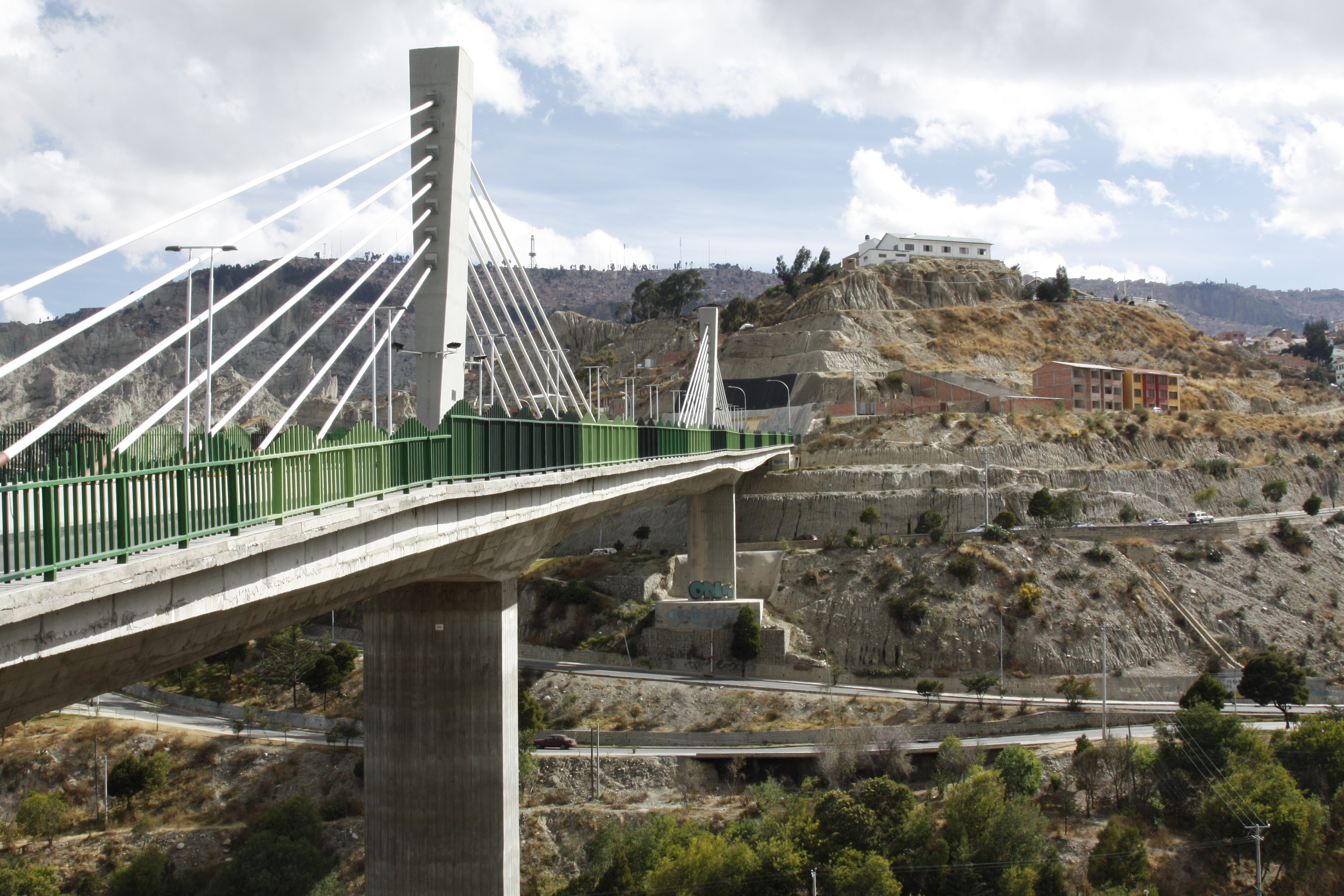
Triplets bridges in la Paz, Bolivia
