= Abetxuko Bridge =

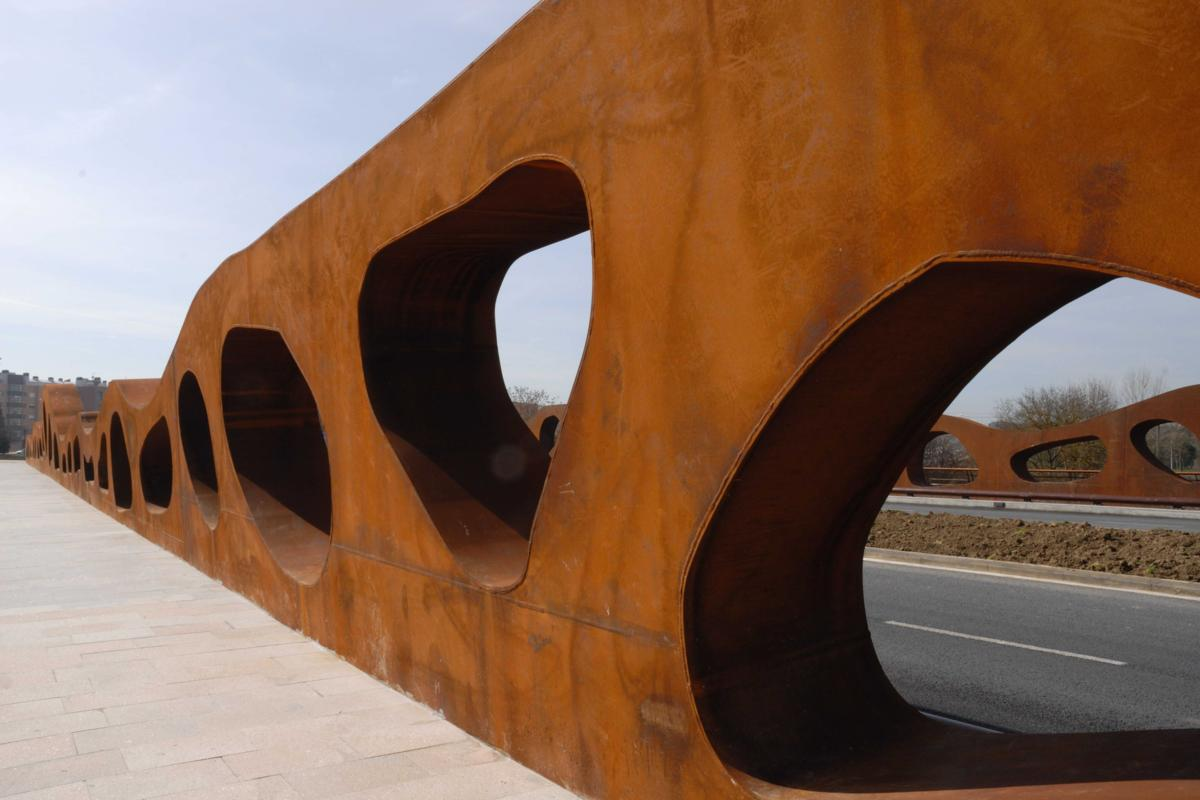
- Bridge view
- Coordinates: 42.8728°N 2.6817°W
- Carries: Motor vehicles, tramway, pedestrians and bicycles
- Crosses: Zadorra River
- Locale: Vitoria-Gasteiz, Álava, Basque Country, Spain
- Maintained by: Vitoria Municipalily

Characteristics
- Design: truss bridge
- Material: Steel
- Total length: 92 metres (302 ft)
- Width: 31.4 metres (103 ft)
- Longest span: 40 metres (130 ft)
- No. of spans: 3

History
- Designer: Pedelta Structural Engineers
- Engineering design by: Juan Sobrino, Javier Jordan, Juan V. Tirado
- Opened: 2006

Location
- Interactive map of Abetxuko Bridge

The Abetxuko Bridge is a steel girder bridge with organic forms in Vitoria-Gasteiz, Álava, Basque Country, Spain.

The Abetxuko Bridge over the Zadorra River is one of several projects being built by Vitoria council to improve mobility for its citizens and, above all, for the inhabitants of the Abetxuko area who for several decades have only been able to reach the city centre via an old, 6-metre-wide (20 ft) bridge. The narrow deck on the old bridge only has space for two carriageways and a narrow pedestrian walkway. Crossing the bridge was risky for pedestrians as they are so close to the traffic, a danger which the council decided to eliminate in 2005. Also the old bridge had limited hydraulic capacity. It remains just to the east of the current bridge.

The construction of the bridge was also central to the regeneration plan for the area (the green corridor of Vitoria). The project was intended to improve the mobility between the Abetxuko neighbourhood and the centre of Vitoria, connecting the neighbours physically and socially.

== Description ==
The bridge is a continuous structure with three spans, two of 26 metres (85 ft) and a main span of 40 metres (130 ft), and a total deck width of 31.4 metres (103 ft). It carries four road traffic lanes, a central tramway line with two tracks, and two pedestrian walkways. The structural system consists of two parallel trusses with organic forms, their dimensions adjusted according to the structural requirements. The trusses are inclined 5° from the vertical to create a more dynamic appearance for the bridge.

The structure is formed by two longitudinal trusses. The design of the trusses goes beyond the traditional forms, and introduces complex forms of organic shapes whose dimensions fit the resistant requirements. The designers responsible for the creation of the bridge, who have defined the structure as a living work capable of fitting into its surroundings, have used weathering steel to recall the work of Basque artists such as Chillida and Oteiza.

The traditional truss spaces become alveoli of varied forms whose appearance invites very different perspectives. The bridge has the property of changing in colour over time, something that, together with the shadows it projects at certain times of the day, transforms it into a structure that changes together with its surroundings.

The total cost of the structure was approximately €2.7 million (935 €/m^{2}), which is only about 10–15% more than a standard steel bridge of the same dimensions.

== Construction ==
Construction of the bridge began in March 2006, and was successfully completed in December.

== See also ==
Juan Sobrino
