= Vilafant Bridge =

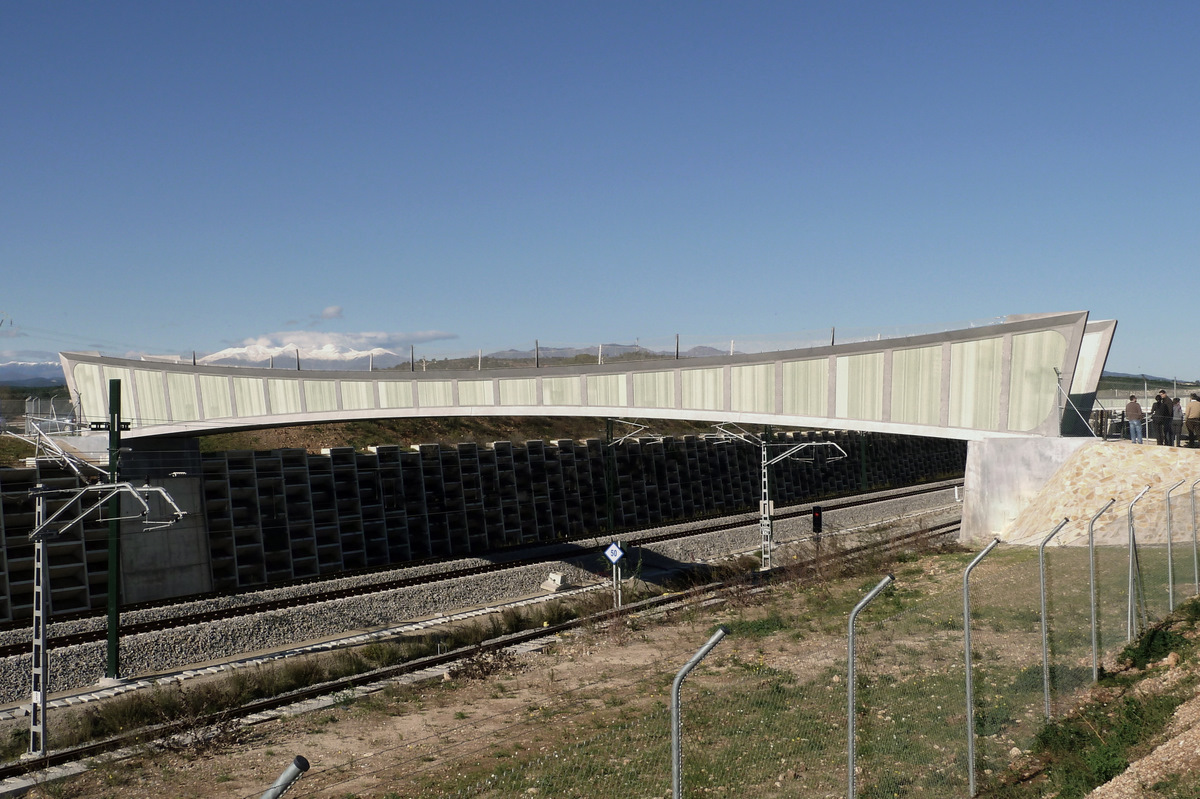
- Bridge view
- Coordinates: 42°15′00″N 2°57′00″E
- Carries: Pedestrians
- Crosses: High Speed Railway
- Locale: Vilafant, Catalonia, Spain
- Owner: ADIF

Characteristics
- Design: Stainless-steel and Fiberglass
- Material: Light-weight materials, Glass-Fibre-Reinforced-Polymer (GFRP)

History
- Designer: Pedelta Structural Engineers
- Engineering design by: Juan Sobrino, Javier Jordán, Lara Pellegrini
- Opened: 2011

The High Speed Railway line connecting Barcelona and the French border crosses the Municipality of Vilafant 19 ft (6 m) below the ground level. To cross the sunken railroad, two pedestrian bridges were constructed. The structure, with one span of 150 ft (46 m), is monolithically connected with the abutments. The use of unusual geometric shapes fabricated using stainless-steel and GFRP are blended in an innovative fashion, giving rise to an austere and elegant solution.

== Description ==
The two gateways projected signal constitute a creative and innovative engineering. The forms are soft, curved in a flat landscape, but the purity of line and transparency achieved consistently relate to the environment. The shape evokes the flight of a butterfly on the flat landscape of the Empordà. The structure is both austere and elegant, audible in the distance but not imposed. It is a metaphor for innovation through the use of advanced materials. Represents a driver of technological development and progress of our society.

The choice of materials and design combine to provide a balance between economic, formal and constructive with the best results. The lightness of the structure construction ensures a simple, fast and secure and the simplicity of its design can be prefabricated in workshop, ensuring quality finishes and high performance implementation.

The two crosses have been designed with the same solution, two bridges of about 164 ft (50 m) total light elastically with a single flush vain in their stirrups (solution integral). The bridges allow for a generous platform 13 ft (4 m) useful for pedestrian and bicycle use.

== Construction ==
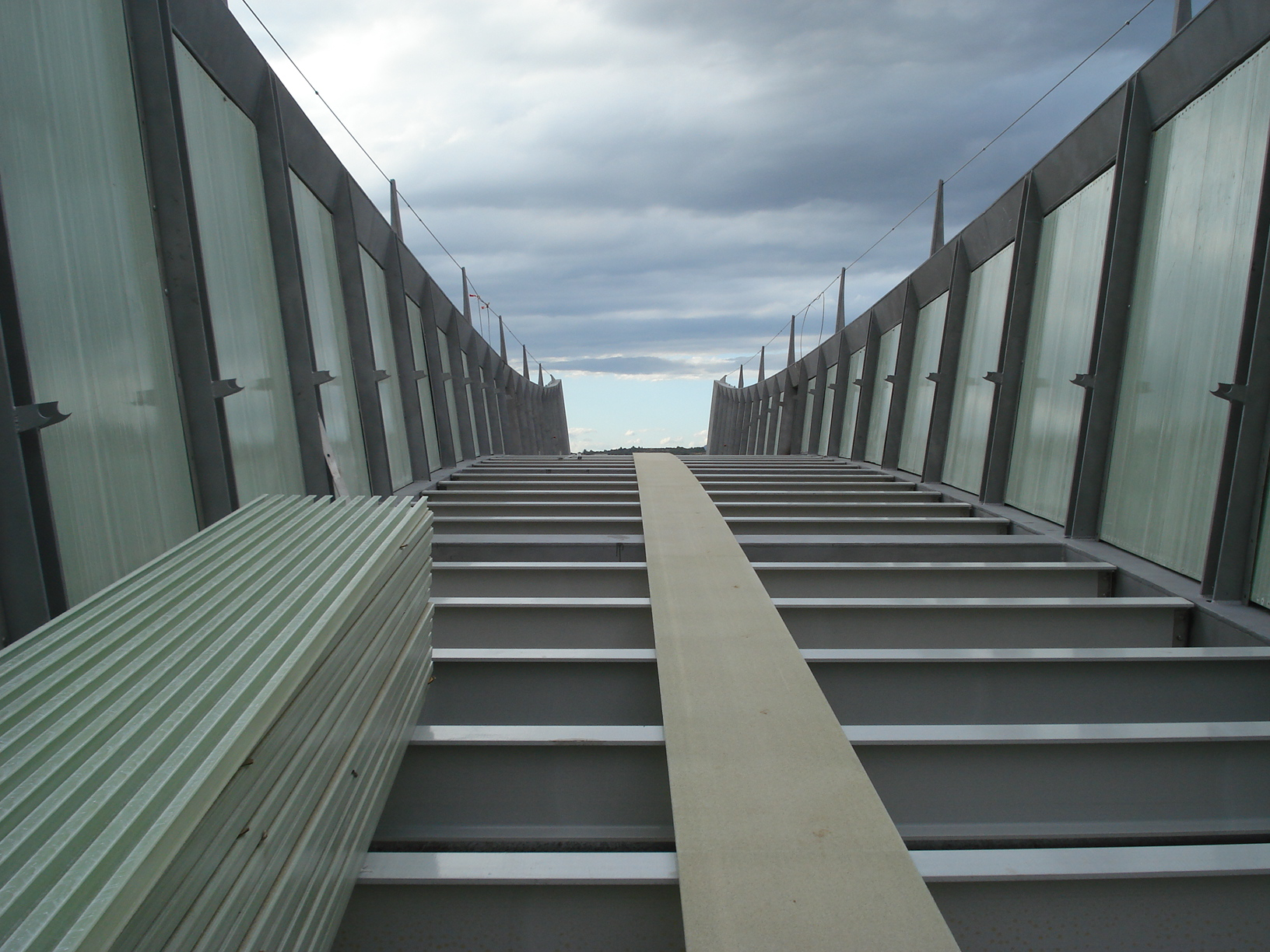
Materials GFRP

The design concept is based on three basic ideas: the use of light-weight materials, the use of materials free of maintenance such as stainless-steel and GFRP (Fiberglass) and minimalism approach (sober and elegant forms and clean lines, creating a bridge with a clearly identity but not dominating the beautiful port environment).

The two bridges have a main longitudinal span of 148 ft (45,2 m) and a width-deck of 13 ft (4 m). The structures are built-in on both abutments. The cross-section consists of two supported Vierendeel trusses combined with double-sheets of GFRP as structural webs. The height of the trusses is variable being 11 ft (3,4 m) at the elastomeric support and 3 ft (1,2 m) at mid-span.
