= The Triplets bridges =

The Triplets Bridges
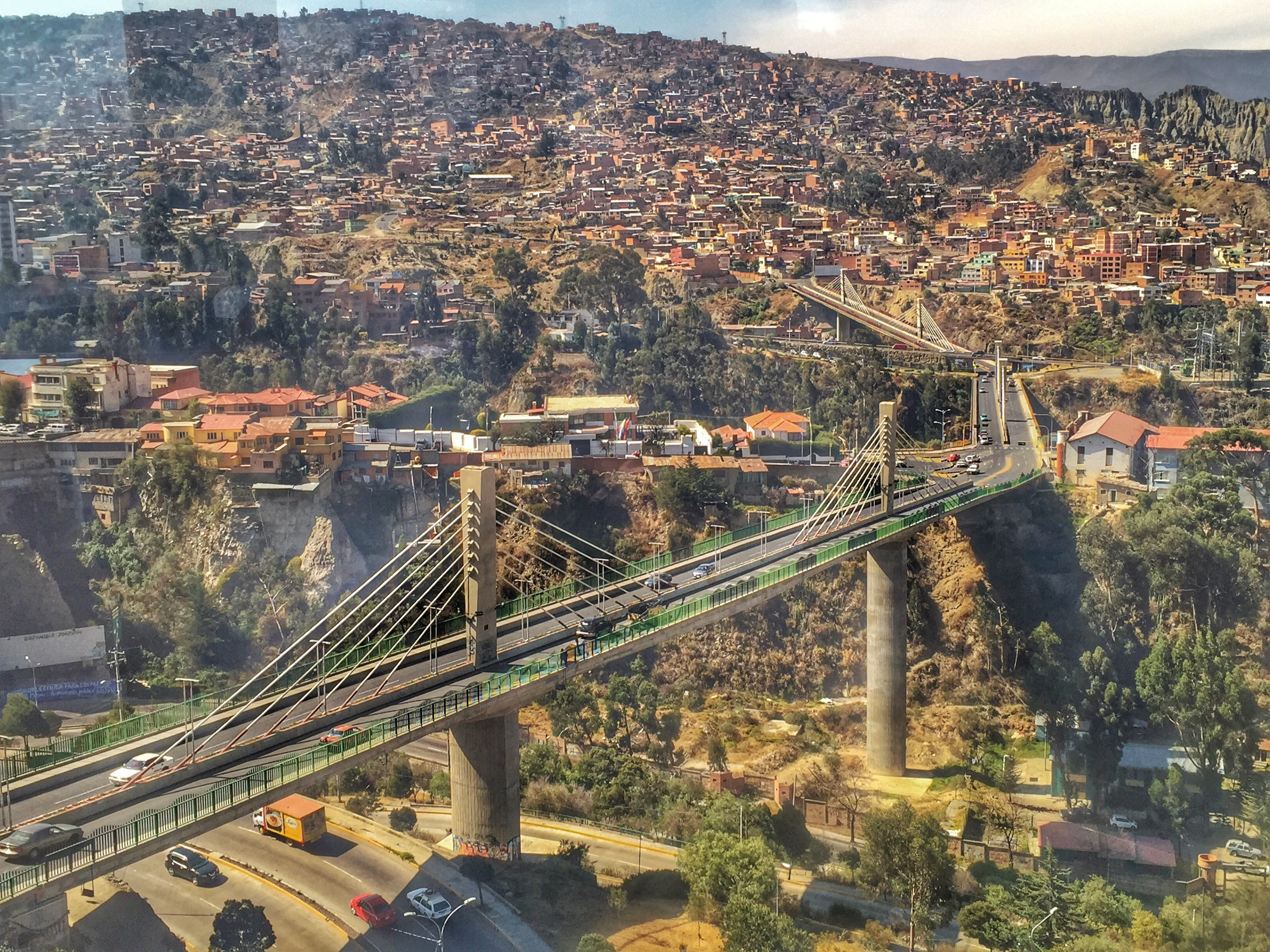
- Bridge view
- Coordinates: 16.516272°S 68.118217°W
- Carries: Motor vehicles
- Crosses: Choqueyapu River and its ravines
- Locale: La Paz, Bolivia
- Official name: Independencia, Libertad, Union
- Maintained by: Envigado Municipality

Characteristics
- Design: Extradosed bridge
- Material: Concrete
- Total length: Overall length 644 m (2,113 ft)
- Width: 14.8 m (49 ft)
- Longest span: 113.5 m (372 ft)
- No. of spans: 3

History
- Designer: Pedelta Structural Engineers
- Engineering design by: Juan A. Sobrino and Javier Jordán
- Opened: November 2010

Location
- Interactive map of The Triplets Bridges

Three consecutive Extradosed bridges are part of a north beltway of La Paz in Bolivia.

The project was funded by CAF (Corporación Andina de Fomento) through a credit to the Municipality in 2006. In 2007, the Municipal Government of La Paz awarded the design and construction of The Triplets Bridge Project to the JV “Consorcio Asociación Accidental Progreso”. As part of this contract, PEDELTA carried out the conceptual and final detailed design.

There was a preliminary design that defined three three-span cable-stayed bridges with central spans between 90 and 110 metres (300 and 360 ft) and two cable-stay planes, similar to another existing in the city: the Bridge of the Americas. After a study of alternatives, where the bridge should have a cable supported deck in order to fulfill the technical specifications of the contract, it was proposed to modify the structural type to improve the visual impact on the landscape of La Paz. Therefore, it was proposed an extradosed bridge type, which reduces the height of the pylon, and a single plane of stays to allow a more transparent view

== Description ==
The Triplets have similar structural pattern and basic idea, but the dimensions are different. All bridges are extradosed with a three-span deck and single central plane of stays.

The bridge deck is 14.8 metres (49 ft) wide and carries four vehicular lanes, two lateral sidewalks 1.4 metres (4.6 ft) wide, and a central median of 1 metre (3.3 ft) where stays anchor, protected on each side by a rigid concrete barriers.

The deck is connected monolithically with the two piers, forming a portal frame, and rests on neoprene bearings at the abutments. The deck is a single-cell box 14 metres (46 ft) wide, whose depth varies between 3.5 and 2.1 metres (11.5 and 6.9 ft) between the piers and central areas or near abutments. The piers, with a single shaft in their full height, are made of reinforced concrete. Some of the piers reach 40 m in height. The pylon coincides with the pier axis under the box girder. Pylon is 15 metres (49 ft) high and has rectangular cross-section linearly variable.

The geometric main features of the bridges are as follows:

- Kantutani Bridge: the bridge has three spans of 52.75 + 113.5 + 67.25 metres (173.1 + 372.4 + 220.6 ft)
- Choqueyapu Bridge: the bridge has three spans of 52.5 + 92.5 + 46.5 metres (172 + 303 + 153 ft)
- Orkojahuira Bridge: the bridge has three spans of 50.3 + 103 + 65.5 metres (165 + 338 + 215 ft)

The total cost of the structure was approximately US$18.3 million.

The project was awarded with the Eugene C. Figg, Jr. Medal for Signature Bridges at the International Bridge Conference (Pittsburgh, June 2012), at a city that also has 3 very similar bridges -- Three Sisters (Pittsburgh).

== Construction ==
The bridge construction began in November 2007 and was completed in mid-2010 to coincide with the commemoration of the Bicentennial of Independence.
