= GFRP Lleida Pedestrian Bridge =

FRP Lleida Pedestrian Bridge
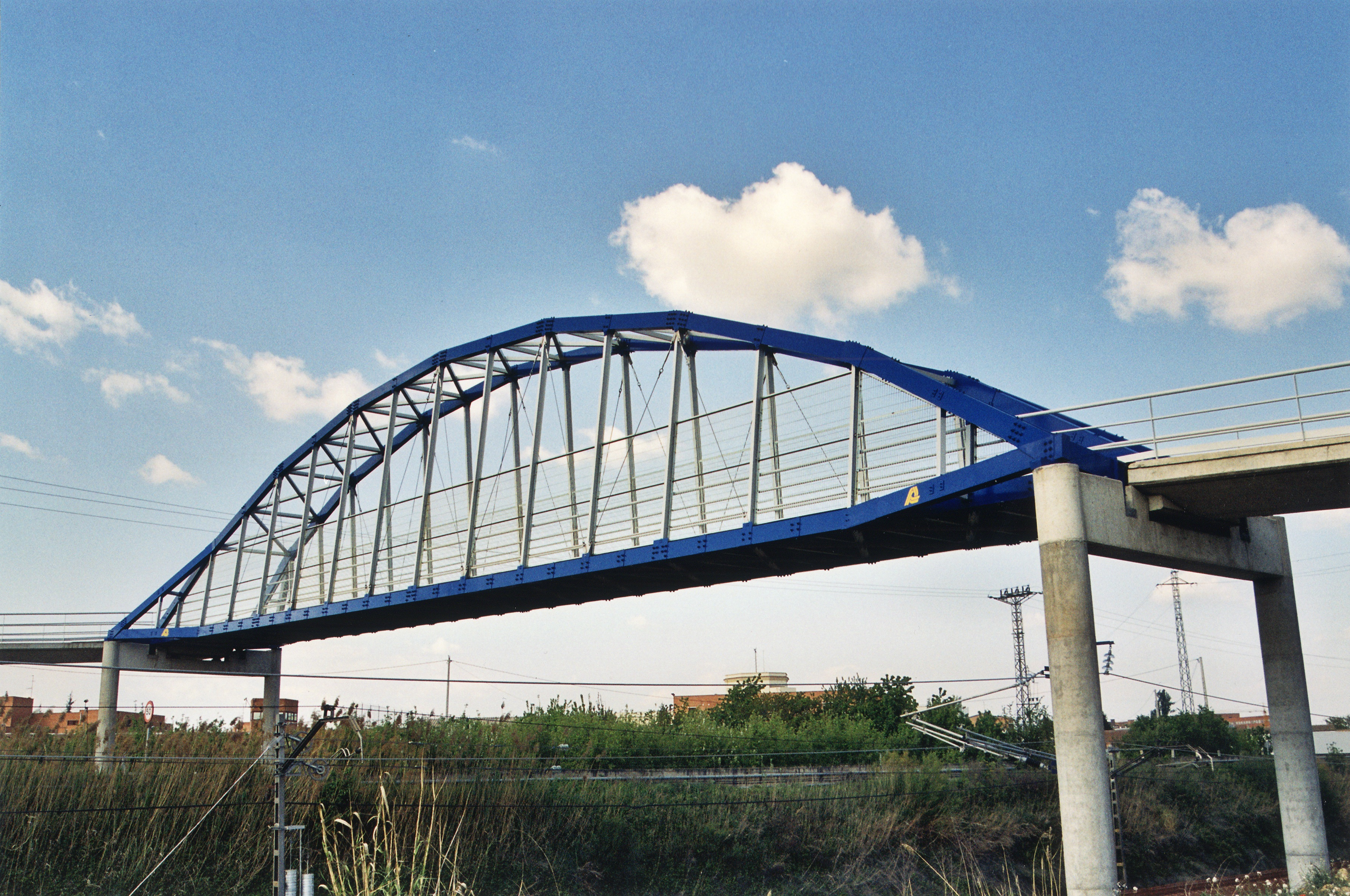
- Bridge view
- Coordinates: 41°37′16″N 0°36′30″E
- Carries: Pedestrians
- Crosses: High-Speed Rail
- Locale: Lleida, Catalonia, Spain
- Owner: ADIF
- Maintained by: Lleida Municipalily

Characteristics
- Design: tied-arch bridge
- Material: GFRP
- Total length: 38 m
- Width: 3 m
- Longest span: 38 m

History
- Designer: Pedelta Structural Engineers
- Engineering design by: Juan Sobrino and Javier Jordan
- Opened: 2001

Location
- Interactive map of FRP Lleida Pedestrian Bridge

The FRP Pedestrian Bridge or Passarel·la de la Ciutat Jardí in Lleida, Catalonia, Spain is the longest arch bridge made out of standard GFRP pultruded profiles.

The bridge spanning the Madrid-Barcelona high-speed rail link won the international “Footbridge Award 2005” in the category “Technology” for medium span (30m-75m) bridges.

== Description ==
The structure is a tied-arch 38 metres (125 ft) long and rises 6.2 metres (20 ft). The deck is 3 metres (9.8 ft) wide. The bridge is entirely made out of GFRP pultruded profiles. The arch configuration was chosen to minimize serviceability problems due to the low modulus of elasticity of GFRP profiles. The choice of GFRP was influenced by the fact that the material is an electrical insulator and eliminates magnetic interference with the electrified railway.

The glass fibre reinforced plastic beams and panels used in the footbridge were manufactured in Denmark and assembled in Spain. The total cost of the structure was approximately $0.32million ($2350 per m^{2}).

It was successfully installed in October 2001. The bridge was fabricated in only three months and erected by crane in just three hours.
