= Cala Galdana Bridge =

Bridge in Menorca, Spain

Cala Galdana Stainless Steel Bridge
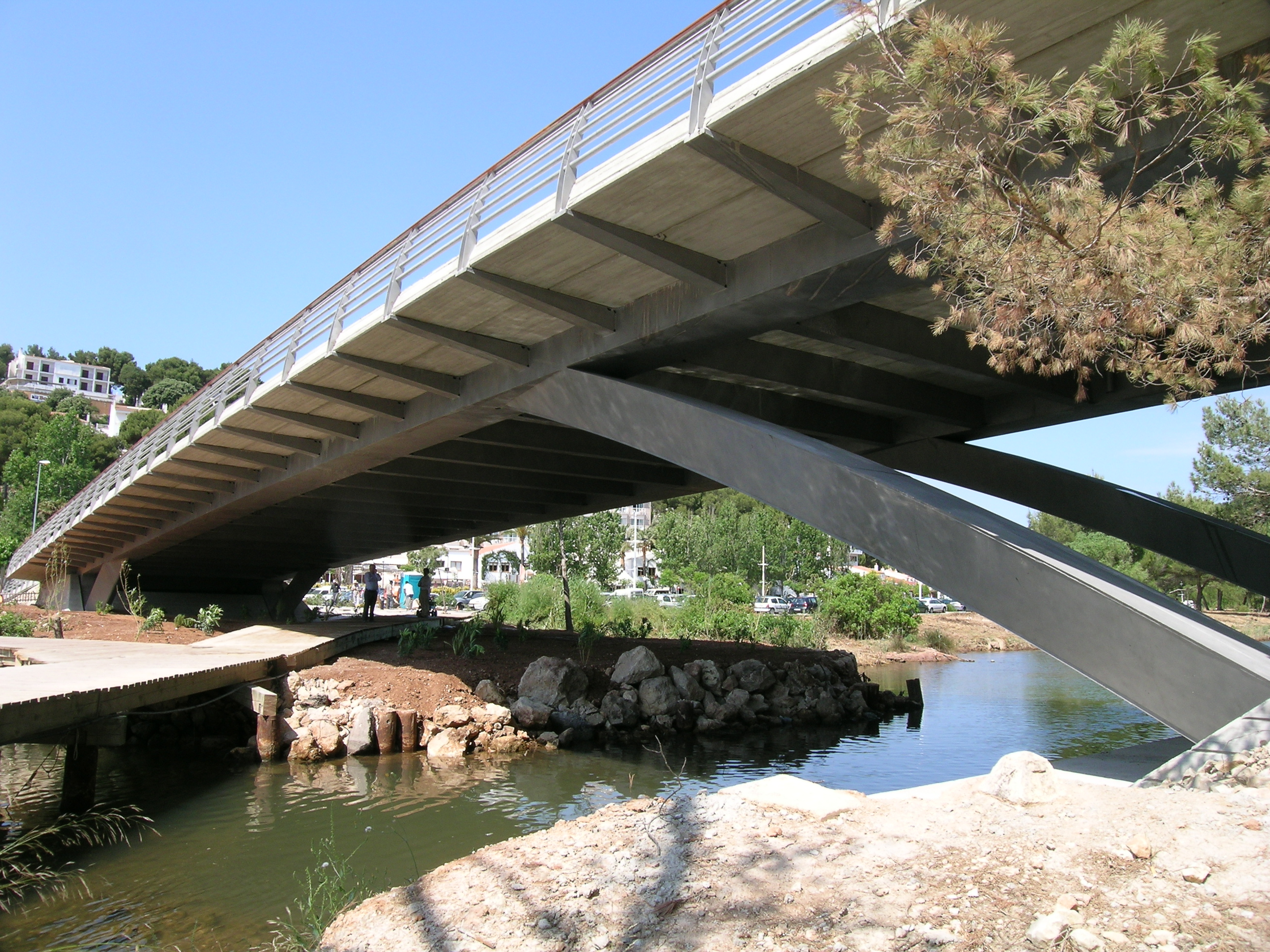
- Bridge from below
- Coordinates: 39°56′23″N 3°57′32″E
- Carries: Motor vehicles Pedestrians, bicycles
- Crosses: Algendar Creek
- Locale: Cala Galdana, Menorca, Spain
- Maintained by: Consell Insular de Menorca

Characteristics
- Design: Stainless-steel arch bridge
- Total length: 55 m
- Width: 13 m
- Longest span: 45 m

History
- Designer: Pedelta Structural Engineers
- Opened: June 2005

The Cala Galdana Bridge is a steel arch bridge over Algendar Creek on the island of Menorca, Spain. It is the first vehicular bridge constructed in duplex stainless steel.

In 2003 its owner (the Consell Insular de Menorca) decided to replace the existing structurally deficient, 18-metre (59-foot) reinforced concrete bridge due to severe corrosion (due to the marine environment) and settlement in one of its supports. The total length of the bridge is 55 metres (180 feet), and its main span is 45 metres (148 feet) long.

== Description ==
The bridge consists of two parallel arches with a free span of 45 metres (148 feet) and an intermediate deck. The arches rise to a total of 6 metres (20 feet) with a span-rise ratio of 7:5, and attach to the deck with two connected longitudinal beams. The arches have a triangular cross-section, with a central web. Their depth is .7 metres (2 feet 4 inches), constant through their length; the width of each section varies between .7 and 1 meter. The longitudinal beams are rectangular hollow sections 1 x .5 meters and plates with varying thicknesses between 15 millimetres (0.59 in) and 25 millimetres (0.98 in). In the central zone (with the arch above the deck) the beams have a central web connected to the web of the arch, allowing transfer of the vertical load of the longitudinal beam to the arch. Two struts (connecting the base of each of the arches and the end of the longitudinal beam) avoid horizontal reaction on the abutments.

The main structure weighs 165 metric tons (182 short tons) and is made of duplex stainless steel with a grade of 1.4462, which exhibits a high resistance to corrosion by chlorides. The deck is made of reinforced concrete, connected to a series of transverse beams. It was completed at a cost of Є2.6 million.

== Construction ==
Construction was begun by Ferrovial in October 2004 (with demolition of the existing bridge), and completed in early June 2005.
