= High Speed Railway Bridge over AP7, Llinars del Valles =

High Speed Railway Bridge in Llinars
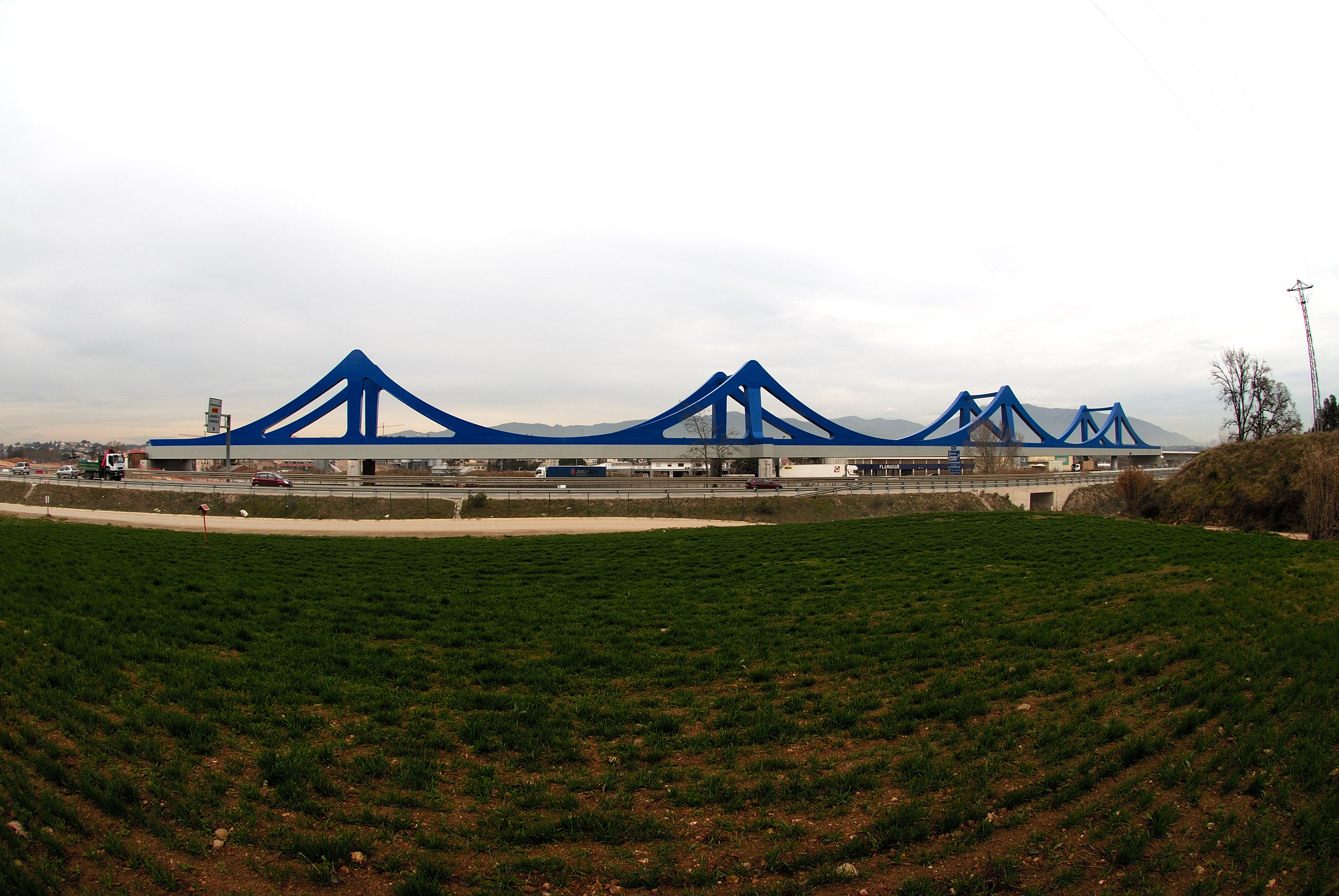
- Bridge view
- Coordinates: 41°38′19″N 2°24′48″E
- Carries: High Speed Railway
- Crosses: Autopista AP-7
- Locale: Llinars del Vallès, Catalonia, Spain
- Owner: ADIF

Characteristics
- Total length: 1,883 ft (574 m)

History
- Designer: Pedelta Structural Engineers
- Construction end: 2006
- Opened: 2006

Location
- Interactive map of High Speed Railway Bridge in Llinars

The Llinars Bridge this bridge is the first steel structure in the high-speed railway (HSR) joining Barcelona and the French Border. The 1,883-foot-long (574 m) Llinars HSR bridge comprises two parts: a 1,008-foot-long (307 m) composite steel–concrete structure crossing Autopista AP-7, and a continuous prestressed concrete bridge crossing the Mogent River with a maximum span of 157 feet (48 m).

After analyzing many possible color combinations for the Llinars bridge, the designers selected blue for the members above the deck level and gray for the bottom of the longitudinal beams. This combination was intended to make the structure appear more slender.

== Description ==
The 574-metre-long (1,883 ft) Llinars bridge comprises two parts: A 307-metre-long (1,007 ft) composite steel and concrete structure crossing AP-7 and a continuous structure made of prestressed concrete crossing the Mogent River with a maximum span of 48 metres (157 ft). The location of the piers was dictated by the highly skewed angle of the highway crossing and by the launching process used to erect the bridge. The final bridge features a composite steel and concrete deck suspended on structural steel tied members.

== Construction ==
Construction of the Llinars bridge began in 2003. An effort was made to develop an aesthetically pleasing solution that would be transparent and well suited to the site. To avoid interfering with the operation of Barcelona’s critically important tollway, incremental launching construction methods were used for the composite steel and concrete section. This section includes a deck that is a continuous structure with five spans.

The suspension members have a typical box girder cross section with an average depth of 1.7 m (5 ft 7 in). The flange width, 1.6 m (5 ft 3 in), does not vary along the girder. For aesthetic reasons, the members have a radius of curvature of 48.6 m (159 ft), limiting the large structure’s vertical clearance over the highway and diminishing its visual obtrusiveness. A complex steel structure with innovative aesthetics. This High-Speed Rail Bridge required a complex dynamic analysis. The launching method used for construction avoided any interference with the traffic below and to complete the structure on time and budget.
