= All's Fair in Love =

All's Fair in Love may refer to:

- All's Fair in Love (1921 film), an American film
- All's Fair in Love (2024 film), a Nigerian film

== See also ==
- All Is Fair in Love and War
