= All Is Fair in Love and War =

All Is Fair in Love and War may refer to:

- "All is fair in love and war", a proverb attributed to John Lyly's Euphues: The Anatomy of Wit
- All Is Fair in Love and War (album), an album by Blessed by a Broken Heart
- "All Is Fair in Love and War" (song), a song by Ronnie Milsap
- "All Is Fair in Love and War", the second episode of the ninth season of the reality TV show Total Divas
