= Total Divas season 9 =

Season of American television series Total Divas

Total Divas
- Season 9
- Starring: Naomi; Natalya; Carmella; Nia Jax; Ronda Rousey; Sonya Deville
- No. of episodes: 10

Release
- Original network: E!
- Original release: October 1 – December 10, 2019

Season chronology
- ← Previous; Season 8

Total Divas is an American reality television series that premiered on July 28, 2013, on E!. The series gave viewers an inside look at the lives of WWE Divas from their work within WWE to their personal lives. Season 8 ended on November 28, 2018, with 412 thousand viewers.

== Production ==
On May 7, 2018, E! and WWE announced that Total Divas had been renewed for seasons 8 and 9.

In April 2019, Brie and Nikki Bella announced that they would not be returning for the ninth season of Total Divas, saying that they wanted to focus solely on Total Bellas. In August 2019, it was revealed that Naomi, Natalya, and Nia Jax were set to return for season nine alongside Carmella, who was announced to be returning as a series regular, and new cast members Ronda Rousey and Sonya Deville. Additionally, Brie and Nikki Bella were reported to continue making appearances as guests during the season. The ninth season began on October 1, 2019.

In June 2021, Essentially Sports reported that the E! Network had cancelled Total Divas and its sister show Total Bellas, citing low ratings and a lack of interest from those involved.

== Cast ==
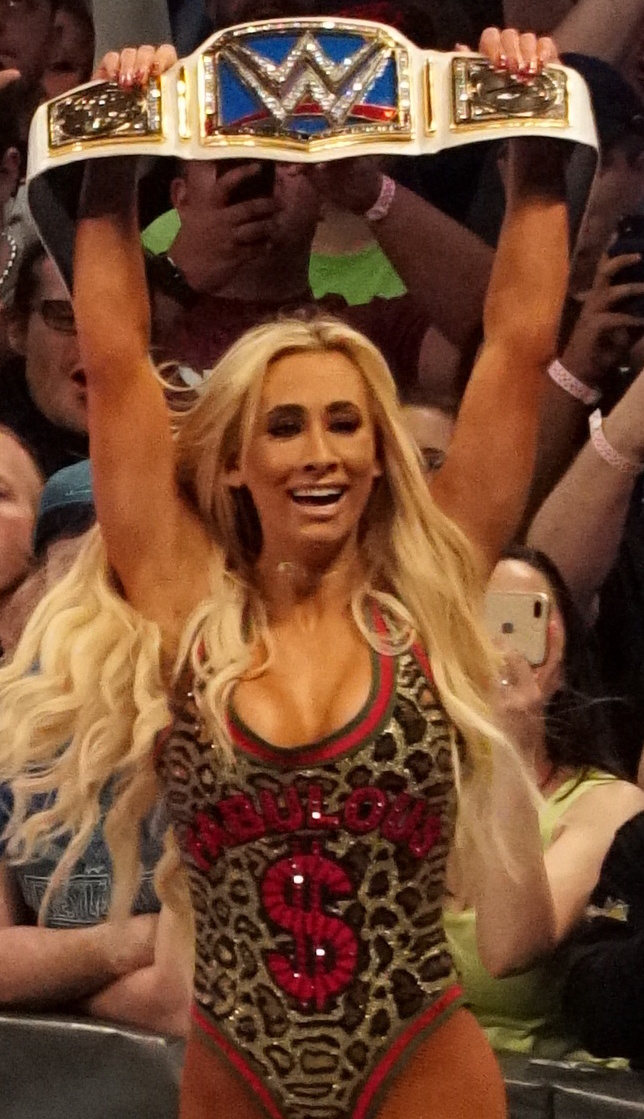
Carmella; who rejoined the main cast in season 9.

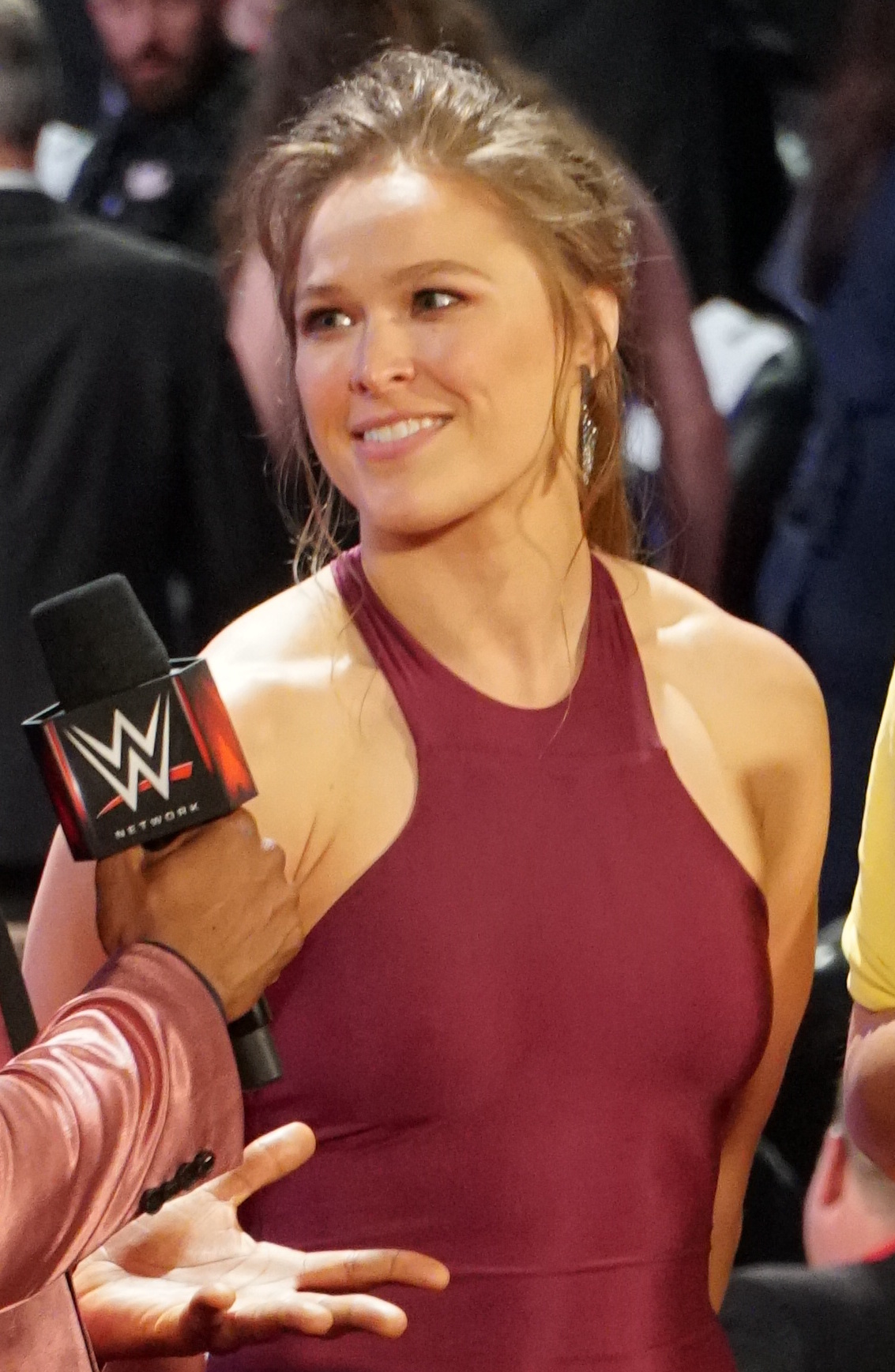
Ronda Rousey; who joined the cast of Total Divas in season 9.

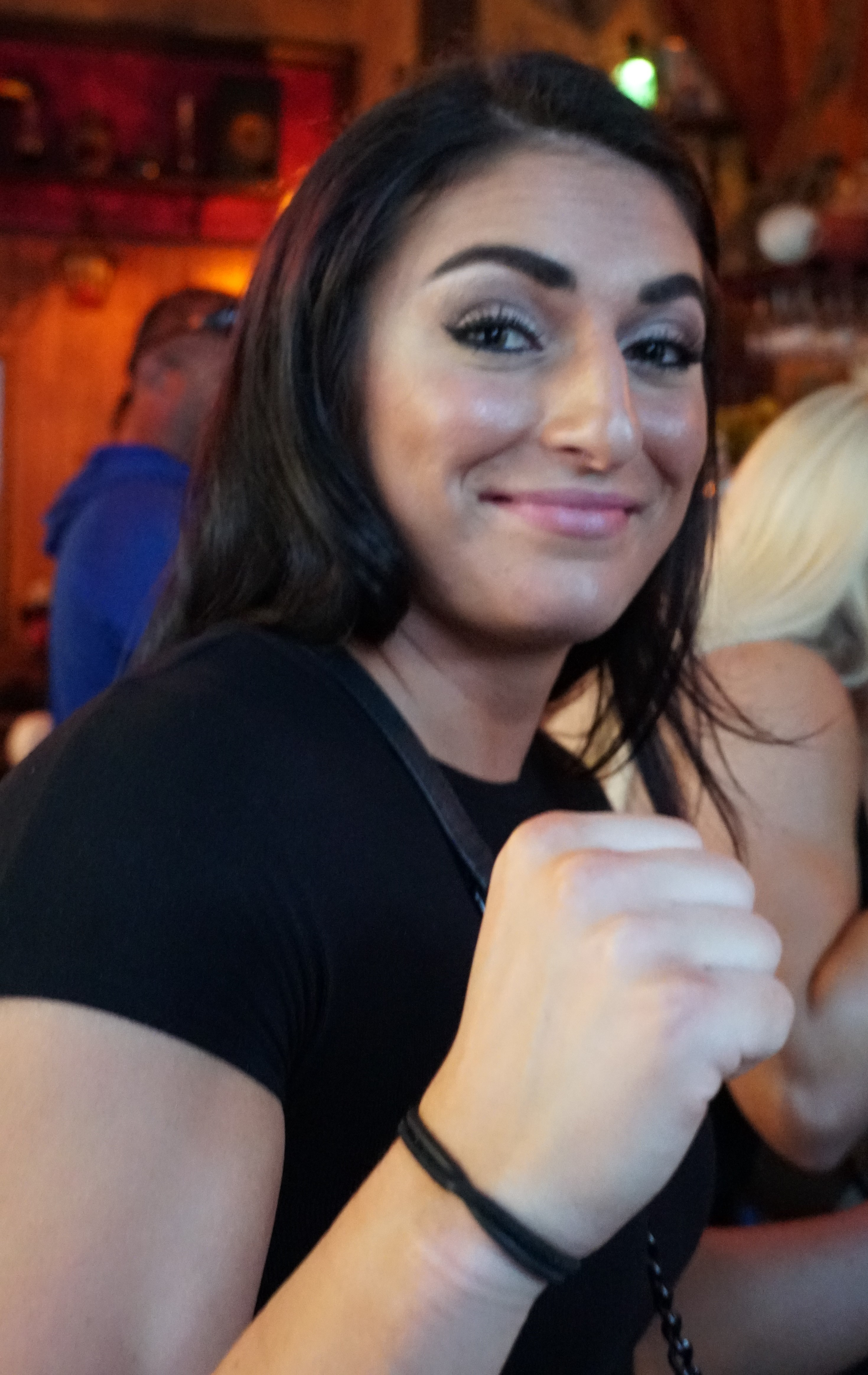
Sonya Deville; who joined the cast of Total Divas in season 9.

=== Main cast ===
- Naomi (Trinity Fatu)
- Natalya (Natalie Neidhart-Wilson)
- Carmella (Leah Van Dale)
- Nia Jax (Savelina Fanene)
- Ronda Rousey
- Sonya Deville (Daria Berenato)

=== Recurring cast ===
- Brie Bella (Brianna Danielson)
- Nikki Bella (Stephanie Nicole Garcia-Colace)
- Corey Graves (Carmella's boyfriend)
- Travis Browne (Ronda's husband)
- Arianna Johnson (Sonya's girlfriend)
- Charly Caruso (WWE On-Air Personality)
- Liv Morgan (Gionna Jene Daddio)

=== Guest stars ===
- Alexa Bliss (Alexis Kaufman)
- JoJo (Joseann Offerman)
- Mandy Rose (Amanda Rose Saccomanno)
- Paige (Saraya-Jade Bevis)
- Renee Young (Renee Paquette)
- Daniel Bryan (Brie's husband)
- Jimmy Uso (Naomi's husband)
- Tyson Kidd (Natalya's husband)
- Beth Phoenix (Elizabeth Copeland)
- Billie Kay (Jessica McKay)
- Bret Hart (WWE Hall of Famer & Nattie's uncle)
- Ember Moon (Adrienne Reese)
- Jessamyn Duke (NXT Superstar)
- Marina Shafir (NXT Superstar)
- The Miz (Michael Mizanin)
- Peyton Royce (Cassie McIntosh)
- Tamina (Sarona Snuka-Polamalu)
- Ellie Neidhart (Nattie's mother)
- Jenni Neidhart (Nattie's sister)

== Episodes ==
No. overall	No. in season	Title	Original release date	Prod. code	U.S. viewers (millions)
111	1	"The Baddest Women on the Planet"	October 1, 2019	901	0.25
The women take center stage as they compete in their second women's Royal Rumble match; Ronda deals with the decision of when to put her career on hold and become a mother; Sonya contemplates getting back together with her ex, while Nia lets Carmella know what she really thinks about her.
112	2	"All Is Fair In Love and War"	October 8, 2019	902	0.26
As the WWE announces the Women's Tag Team Championships, Nattie worries about missing out on history-making moments; Sonya deals with the stress of the pride parade and an impending injury she may have sustained, while Carmella is faced with the backlash from her controversial relationship.
113	3	"Rowdy Ronda"	October 15, 2019	903	0.28
Carmella throws a surprise party for her new boyfriend Corey, but things do not go as planned; Nattie does some physical labor on Ronda's farm that ends in tears; Sonya deals with past struggles about accepting herself, and Naomi embraces her insecurities.
114	4	"Damage Control"	October 22, 2019	904	0.27
Naomi spontaneously organizes a girls trip; Carmella takes the chance of venturing out publicly with Corey; Ronda thinks about her life after the WWE while Nia reaches her limits with Ronda's in-ring success.
115	5	"The Real Ronda"	October 29, 2019	905	0.28
Sonya's relationship takes an accelerating turn; Carmella ventures into the world of rap where her and R-Truth make a song together; Ronda tries to figure out the fundamentals between being a bad guy and being a bad friend, and Nia receives news that could jeopardize her in-ring career.
116	6	"MountainMania"	November 5, 2019	906	0.19
Ronda invites the ladies up to her home for a girls' weekend; Carmella digs herself into a hole; Nattie gives advice to Sonya about mending things with Ronda, while Nia opens up to Brie and Nicole about her impending future with the WWE.
117	7	"I Will Prevail"	November 12, 2019	907	0.25
As WrestleMania 35 approaches, Sonya is elated with the news of her representing the LGBTQ community in a story line with her tag team partner Mandy Rose; Nia irons out her past differences with Carmella; Ronda contemplates what's next for her after WrestleMania, and Nattie prepares to pay homage to her late father.
118	8	"35 Years in the Making"	November 19, 2019	908	0.29
The women take center stage in the main event at WrestleMania 35, the WWE not knowing that Ronda plans to retire after her match; Nattie experiences a scary altercation at the WWE Hall of Fame event; Sonya continues to honor the LGBTQ community, and Nia faces her fears.
119	9	"Hawaiian Punch"	December 3, 2019	909	0.24
Nattie arranges a girls' trip to Maui to decompress after WrestleMania; Nia prepares for her upcoming surgery; Sonya holds a grudge; Carmella feels awkward, and Ronda embarks on her future beyond the ring with her husband.
120	10	"The Next Wave"	December 10, 2019	910	0.22
While on vacation, Nattie runs into some trauma while surfing; Brie and Nicole organize a tearful surprise for Liv; Sonya declares her true feelings to her girlfriend; Nia undergoes surgery, and Ronda looks ahead towards her future beyond the WWE.

== Ratings ==
No.	Title	Original air date	Viewership (millions) (Live+SD)	Rating/share (18–49) (Live+SD)	Rank per week on cable
1	"The Baddest Women on the Planet"	October 1, 2019	0.25	TBD	#79
2	"All Is Fair In Love and War"	October 8, 2019	0.26	TBD	#64
3	"Rowdy Ronda"	October 15, 2019	0.28	TBD	#67
4	"Damage Control"	October 22, 2019	0.27	TBD	#70
5	"The Real Ronda"	October 29, 2019	0.28	TBD	#69
6	"MountainMania"	November 5, 2019	0.19	TBD	#93
7	"I Will Prevail"	November 12, 2019	0.25	TBD	#58
8	"35 Years in the Making"	November 19, 2019	0.29	TBD	#95
9	"Hawaiian Punch"	December 3, 2019	0.24	TBD	#74
10	"The Next Wave"	December 10, 2019	0.22	TBD	#94
