= Women in WWE =

Throughout its history, women have served in various onscreen roles in the American professional wrestling promotion WWE. In the 1990s, WWE (then known as the World Wrestling Federation) introduced the term Diva to refer to its female performers, including wrestlers, managers or valets, backstage interviewers, or ring announcers.

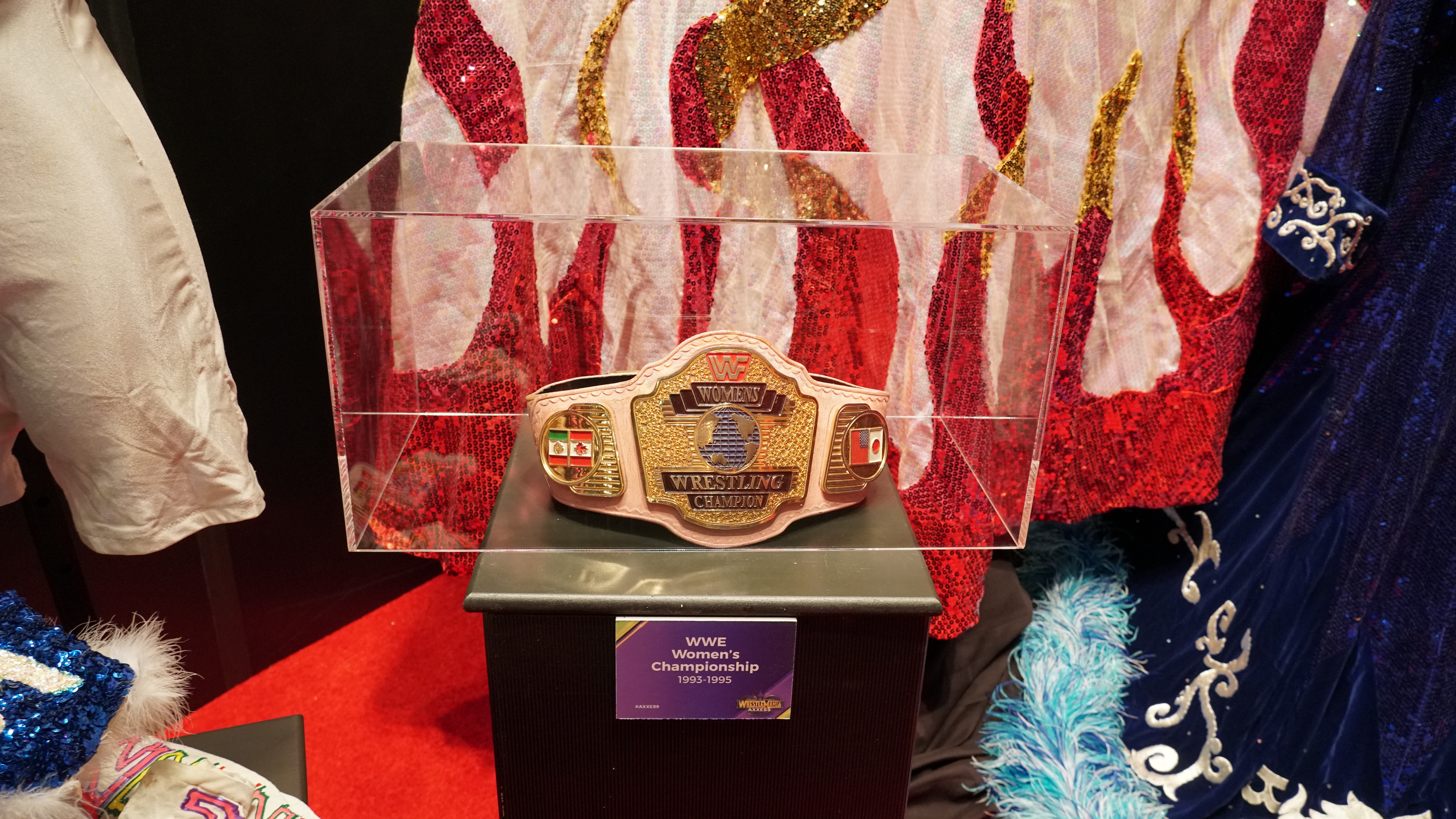
A picture of the 1993 to 1995 championship design of the WWF Women's Championship.

At WrestleMania 32 in 2016, WWE announced their discontinuation of the "Diva" branding for its female performers, as part of a move to present them in an athletic manner more in line with their male counterparts, rather than in a means based around sex appeal. The promotion began to refer to them using the "Superstar" title it uses for male performers, and established a new WWE Women's Championship to replace the WWE Divas Championship. Subsequently, women's matches were featured more prominently across their programming, which included more frequent main event positions. WrestleMania 35 featured a women's match as its main event for the first time in WrestleMania history.

== History ==
=== Early history (1980s–1990s) ===
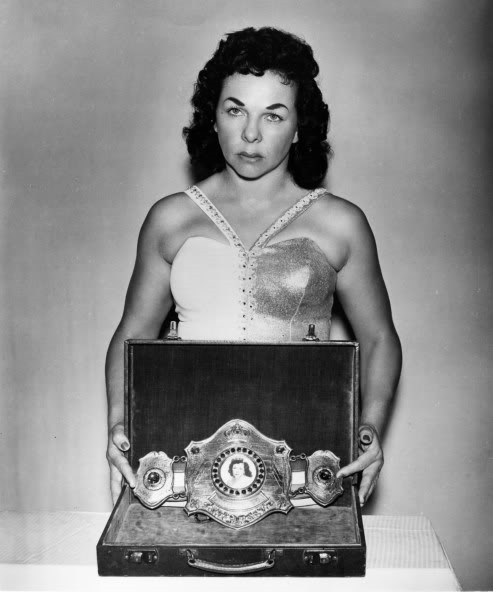
The Fabulous Moolah, recognized by WWE as having held the WWF Women's Championship for 28 years and first woman to be inducted into the WWE Hall of Fame.

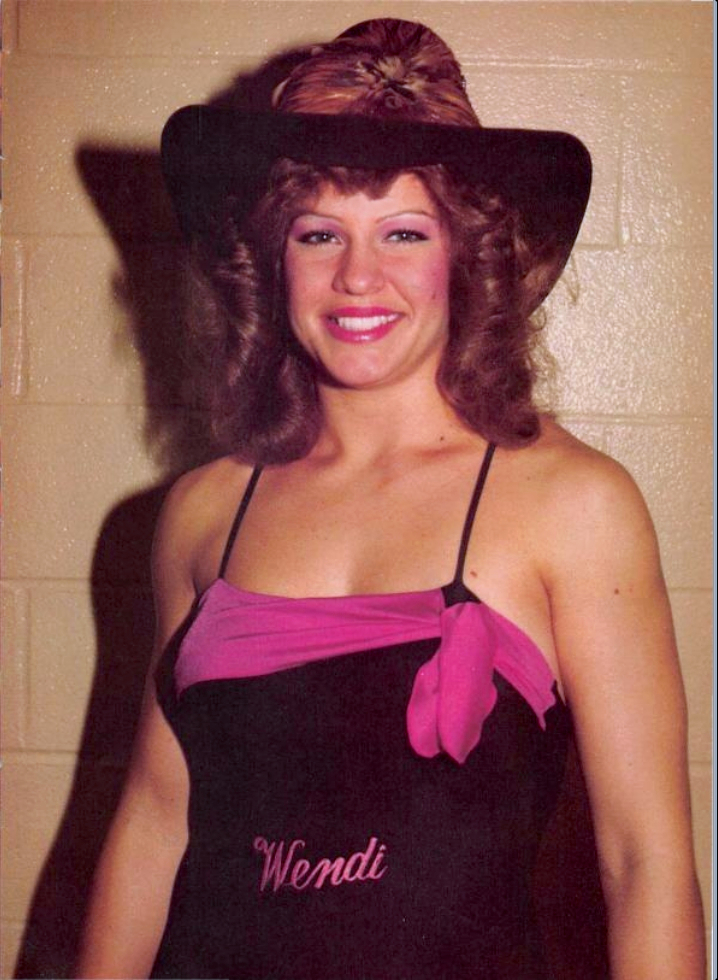
WWE Hall of Famer Wendi Richter, famously known for ending The Fabulous Moolah's 28-year title reign

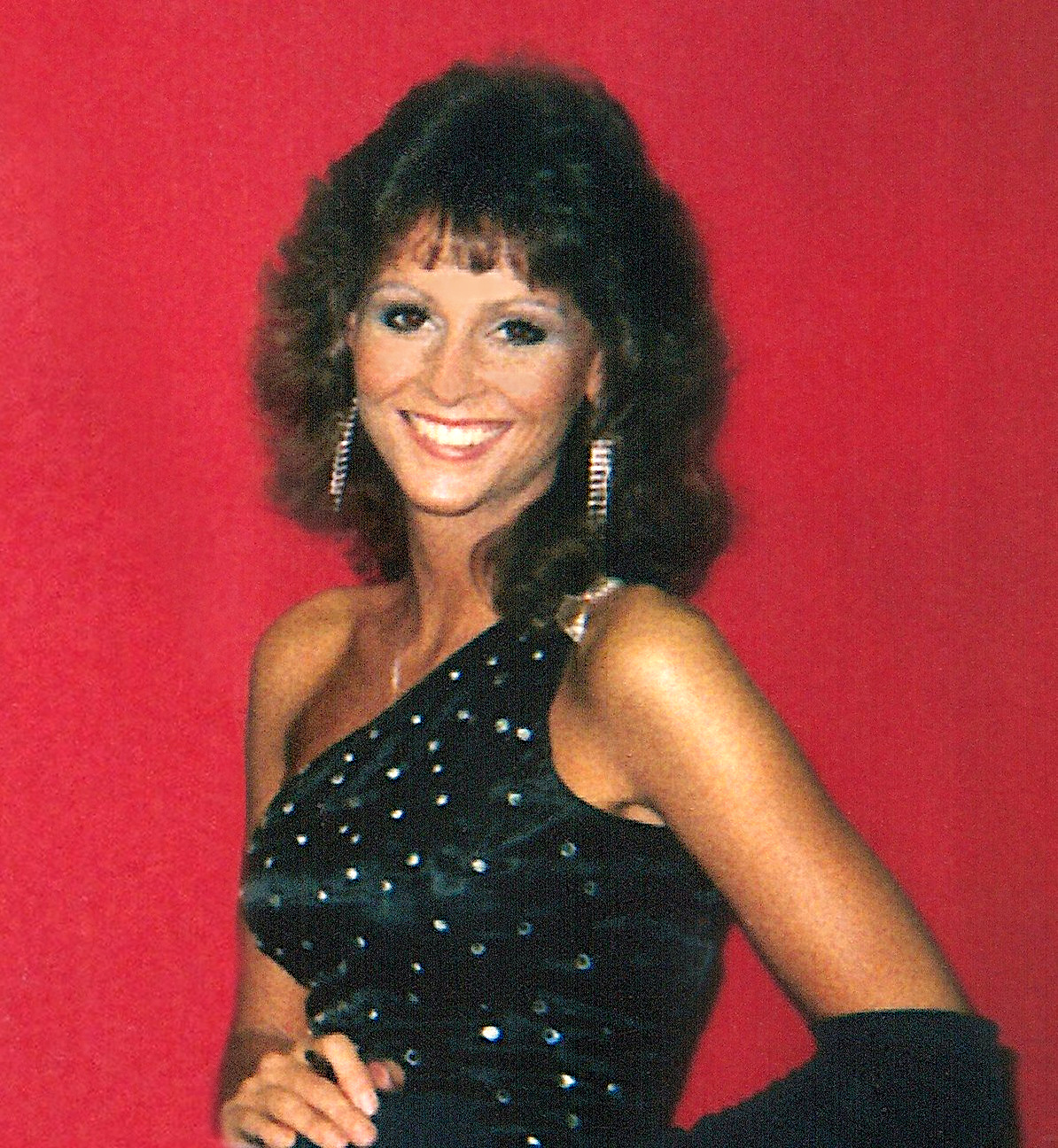
Miss Elizabeth was dubbed the "First Lady of Wrestling" in her WWF career from 1985 to 1992 and played a central role in the storyline between the WrestleMania IV and WrestleMania V events.

In 1983, The Fabulous Moolah, who was the NWA World Women's Champion and legal owner of the title, joined the WWF and sold them the rights to the title after they disaffiliated from the National Wrestling Alliance (NWA) and recognized her as the first WWF Women's Champion. Additionally, the WWF also recognized Moolah as having been champion ever since first winning the title from Judy Grable in 1956 and disregarded other reigns or title losses that occurred during the title's existence in the NWA. Thus, The Fabulous Moolah's reign was considered to have lasted 28 years by the promotion. WWF also introduced the WWF Women's Tag Team Championship with Velvet McIntyre and Princess Victoria recognized as the first champions after also defecting from the NWA.

The following year, music artist Cyndi Lauper began a verbal feud with her manager "Captain" Lou Albano; this brought professional wrestling into mainstream culture in a storyline that became known as the "Rock 'n' Wrestling Connection". When it was finally time for Lauper and Albano to settle their differences in the ring, a match-up was scheduled with Albano's represented wrestler Moolah against the challenge of Lauper's protégé, Wendi Richter. Moolah lost the title at The Brawl to End It All, broadcast live on MTV. Richter then lost the title to Leilani Kai the following year, but won it back at WrestleMania I on March 31, 1985. It was during the Rock 'n' Wrestling Connection that the WWF introduced its first female referee, Rita Chatterton.

In the summer of 1985, the WWF did a storyline where all established managers in the promotion competed to offer their services to Randy Savage. Savage revealed his new manager to be Miss Elizabeth on the August 24, 1985, edition of WWF Prime Time Wrestling. In real life, Savage and Miss Elizabeth were married, but this was not mentioned on television. Miss Elizabeth's first major angle was during Savage's feud with George "The Animal" Steele in 1986. In the angle, Steele fell in love with Miss Elizabeth, angering Savage and leading to a series of grudge matches between him and Steele. She also figured prominently in Savage's 1986 feuds with Hulk Hogan and Ricky "the Dragon" Steamboat and his 1987–1989 feuds with wrestlers such as The Honky Tonk Man, Andre the Giant, Bad News Brown, Big Boss Man and Akeem. In 1988, Miss Elizabeth was given the title "First Lady of the World Wrestling Federation" due to her being the first woman in World Wrestling Federation history to manage the World Wrestling Federation champion. When Savage—who had formed an alliance with Hogan—turned on Hogan in early 1989, Miss Elizabeth was a major factor, and she eventually sided with Hogan. Meanwhile, Savage became allied with "Sensational" Sherri, who had success as a wrestler from 1987 to 1989 and was phased into a role as an ill-tempered, venomous manager.

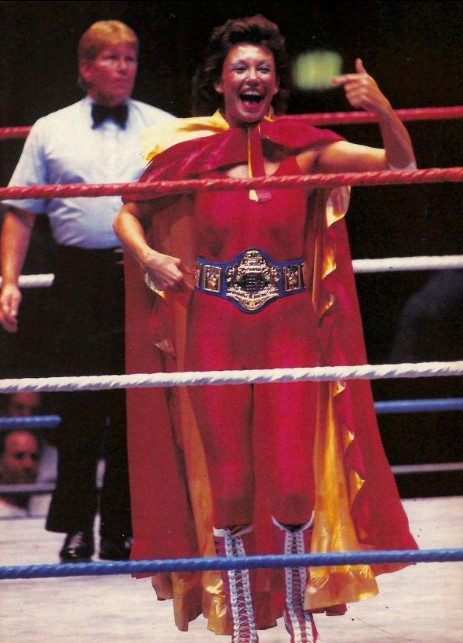
WWE Hall of Famer Sherri Martel, 1-time WWF Women's Champion and a notable manager of numerous WWE wrestlers.

Sherri initially debuted on July 24, 1987, by defeating The Fabulous Moolah for the WWF Women's Championship. Renaming herself 'Sensational' Sherri, she reigned as champion for fifteen months before losing it to Rockin' Robin; after losing several rematches, Martel took a short leave of absence in early 1989 before being repackaged as Savage's manager. Also in 1987 Mike McGuirk was introduced as the first female ring announcer of the promotion, arriving after Jesse Ventura referred her to the WWF. In the fall of 1987, McGuirk provided color commentary for several arena show tapings in the Houston, Texas area, which aired on Prime Time Wrestling.

The first Survivor Series pay-per-view saw the first female elimination match. In February 1989, the WWF Women's Tag Team Championship was deactivated and The Glamour Girls (Leilani Kai and Judy Martin) were the final title holders. Sapphire debuted in November 1989 on Saturday Night's Main Event XXV as a 'fan' cheering on Dusty Rhodes at ringside in his match against Big Boss Man. Sapphire began to manage Rhodes, and adopted Rhodes' gimmick, as she adorned black outfits with yellow polka dots. Sapphire and Rhodes later feuded with Randy Savage and Sensational Sherri and wrestled in a tag team match at WrestleMania VI. Rockin' Robin was the last WWF Women's Champion in the late 1980s.

In 1990, Sensational Sherri remained with Randy Savage, while Sapphire worked with Dusty Rhodes. Sapphire later departed from the company in mid-1990. Miss Elizabeth worked primarily with Dusty Rhodes and Sapphire between WrestleMania VI and SummerSlam (1990). Miss Elizabeth returned in 1991 and was a key player in Randy Savage's retirement match with Ultimate Warrior at WrestleMania VII; Miss Elizabeth left the company for good in April 1992; shortly after her departure, Savage and Miss Elizabeth divorced in real life. At WrestleMania IX, Luna Vachon debuted and initially aligned herself with Shawn Michaels. Later, she aligned herself with Bam Bam Bigelow to feud with Sherri and Tatanka. Martel left the company in 1993.

=== Japanese involvement and Diva beginnings (1993–1997) ===
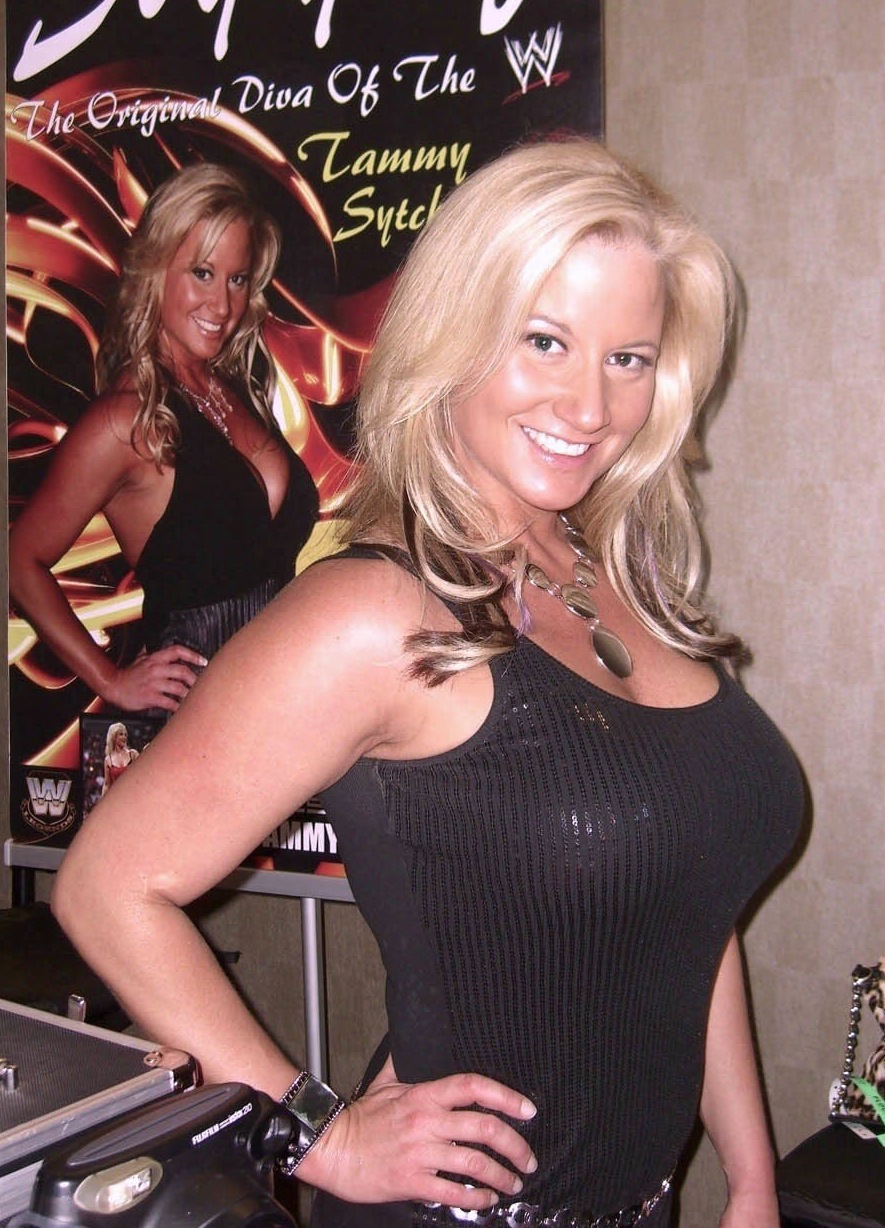
WWE Hall of Famer Tammy Sytch, popularly known as Sunny, considered to be the first WWE Diva.

In 1993, the WWF reinstated its Women's Championship, a title that had been vacant since 1990, and Madusa Miceli was brought in by the company to revive the women's division. She debuted under the ring name Alundra Blayze, because WWF owner Vince McMahon did not want to pay Miceli to use the name Madusa, which she had trademarked. She wrestled in a six-woman tournament to crown a new Women's Champion, and in the finals, she pinned Heidi Lee Morgan on the December 13, 1993, episode of All American Wrestling to win the title.

After the tournament, Miceli asked WWF management to bring in new women for her to wrestle and WWF brought Leilani Kai, Bull Nakano and Bertha Faye. Later on as part of a short talent exchange with All Japan Women's Pro Wrestling, various Japanese female wrestlers including Aja Kong debuted leading to the second elimination match at the Survivor Series 1995 event. In December, due to financial troubles the WWF was having at the time, Blayze was released from her contract and was stripped of the title following her jump back to rival company World Championship Wrestling, and the WWF Women's Championship remained vacant until 1998.

In 1994, WWF signed Sunny as a manager for Chris Candido, becoming considered as the first WWF Diva. Between 1996 and 1998, several valets debuted in WWF: Marlena, Sable and Debra. Following Blayze's controversial exit from the company, the women's division became inactive during this time. At first, the characters were a continuation of the WWE female manager, but became more sexualized as time progressed. In 1996, Sunny was awarded as the manager of the year and her immense popularity expanded beyond professional wrestling when she was regarded as AOL's most downloaded woman, solidifying herself as one of the preeminent figures within WWF. In February 1997, Chyna joined WWF as an antithesis to the rest of the women, a masculine bodybuilder whose sexual identity was the subject of early storylines. Sunny, Marlena, Sable, and Debra were further marketed as sex symbols through WWF's Raw Magazine, which featured monthly spreads of the women in suggestive poses either semi-nude or wearing provocative clothing.

=== Attitude Era (1997–2002) ===
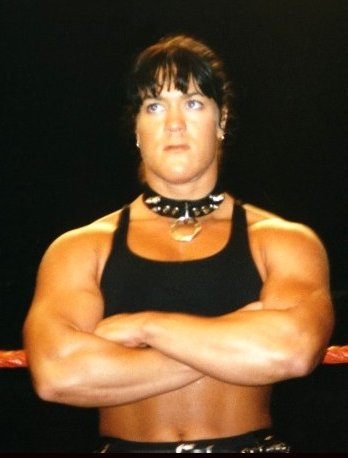
In 1997, Chyna debuted in the WWF as a tomboy female competitor wrestling male talents.

Sable's eclipsed popularity and her feud with Marc Mero and his new manager, Jacqueline led to the reinstatement of the Women's Championship as well as the promotion's hiring of more female wrestlers. Jacqueline won the title and became the first African-American Women's Champion. Meanwhile, Sable's popularity led her to be a Playboy cover girl, although unlike other women, it was written in her contract that she was not allowed to take bumps. Amid the new risqué and adult-oriented strategy of the Attitude Era, Sable and Jacqueline also took part in a bikini contest at Fully Loaded: In Your House. In July 1998, Sunny was released from her contract.

Sable became the first WWF female talent to refer to herself as a "Diva" during the April 19 episode of Raw Is War in 1999; the term shortly thereafter became the official title for WWF's female performers. During the August 9, 1999, episode of Raw Is War, Chyna became the first woman to main event a pro-wrestling prime time show when she defeated Triple H and The Undertaker in a triple threat match to become the number one contender for the WWF Championship, the only woman to ever do so. Veteran wrestlers The Fabulous Moolah and Mae Young returned to WWF, mostly used as comedic roles. At No Mercy on October 17, 1999, 76-year-old Moolah defeated Ivory to win the Women's Championship, becoming the oldest WWF Women's Champion ever. The late 1990s also brought in new women, such as B.B and The Kat, who won the women's championship.

In 1999, Chyna became the first woman to win the WWF Intercontinental Championship when she defeated Jeff Jarrett. She would win the title one more time in 2000 when she defeated Val Venis and Trish Stratus in a mixed tag team match. She also became the first woman to participate in a Royal Rumble match, entering in the 1999 and 2000 editions, as well as participating in the 1999 edition of the King of the Ring tournament. She also was on the cover for Playboy. According to her manager, Vince McMahon offered Chyna to win the WWF Championship if she rejected the offer.

The year 2000 saw the debuts of Lita, Trish Stratus and Molly Holly. Lita performed higher-risk moves than the divas before her, such as moonsaults and diving hurricanranas. Trish Stratus debuted as an overtly sexualized valet. Molly Holly in contrast to most of the other Divas was given a more wholesome gimmick and more modest ring attire. On the August 21 episode of Raw Is War defending champion Stephanie McMahon wrestled Lita in the main event.

Finally, the spring of 2001 saw the WWF's purchase of its chief competitors, World Championship Wrestling (WCW) and Extreme Championship Wrestling (ECW), and the consequent entry of former WCW and ECW female talent, such as Stacy Keibler, Torrie Wilson, Jazz, and Sharmell. WWF Women's Champion Chyna left the WWF towards the end of November due to real-life issues between herself, Triple H, and Stephanie McMahon. In the autumn of 2001, Trish Stratus was trained by Fit Finlay, who was the road agent responsible for the women's matches, and drastically improved her in-ring ability. She worked her way up to the top of the division and eventually won the Women's Championship at Survivor Series. Stratus then entered in a prominent feud with Jazz who debuted at Survivor Series.

=== Ruthless Aggression Era (2002–2008) ===
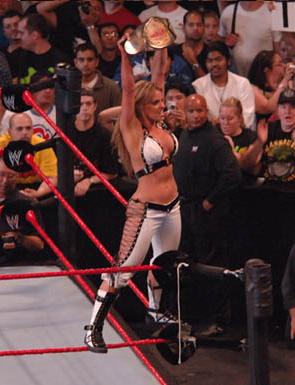
Trish Stratus celebrating her victory as a 7-time WWE Women's Champion in her retirement match in Toronto.

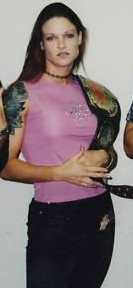
Lita as WWE Women's Champion.

Trish Stratus and Lita were one of the most popular out of most WWE Divas and had teamed with each other and feuded with each other on and off throughout years 2000 to 2006.

Much of the year of 2002 centered around Trish Stratus and her feuds with Jazz, Molly Holly, and a re-debuting Victoria including over the Women's Championship. In April, while filming a small acting role for Dark Angel, Lita suffered a neck injury and was the first female talent to have neck fusion surgery. She was out of action for almost a year and a half. As she rehabilitated, she kept herself visible by co-hosting Sunday Night Heat on MTV.

Since May 5, 2002, the women's division saw an expansion including a departure and a return of a former talent when the WWF officially changed its name to World Wrestling Entertainment (WWE) as the company first began to hire more female talents than ever before, including female winners of the reality television show Tough Enough, which featured contestants aspiring to be professional wrestlers (Nidia in 2001, Linda Miles and Jackie Gayda in 2002). Debra departed the company in June along with her then-husband Stone Cold Steve Austin. Sable returned to WWE on the April 3, 2003, episode of SmackDown! for the first time since controversially departing from the company in late 1999; her first storyline returning to the company for several months was with new Playboy covergirl Torrie Wilson. The WWE women's division competed in more match-ups previously contested only by men (including for the Women's Championship), such as street fights and hardcore matches. The debuting Gail Kim would go on to become the first woman of Asian descent to have held the WWE Women's Championship after winning a battle royal. Numerous Divas competed in contests ranging from "Pillow Fights" and "Bra and Panties" match-ups to "Bikini Contests", which were based more on the sexual appeal of the women involved. Women's trainer Fit Finlay said he was embarrassed to explain to the women how to strip during bra and panties match. According to him, "It was degrading to them" and tried to teach them how to wrestle, but WWE told him they do not want women to wrestle like men.

Victoria and Lita competed in the first Women's steel cage match towards the end of the year on November 24.

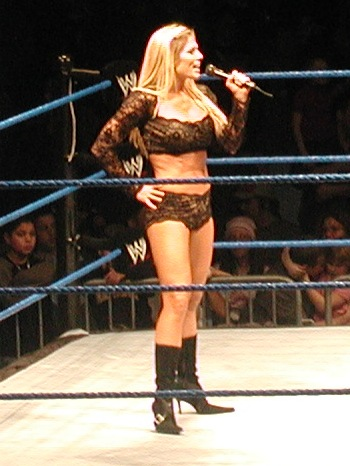
Torrie Wilson

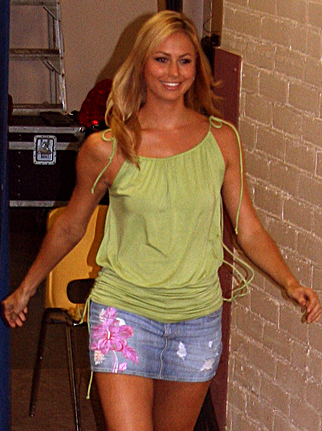
Stacy Keibler

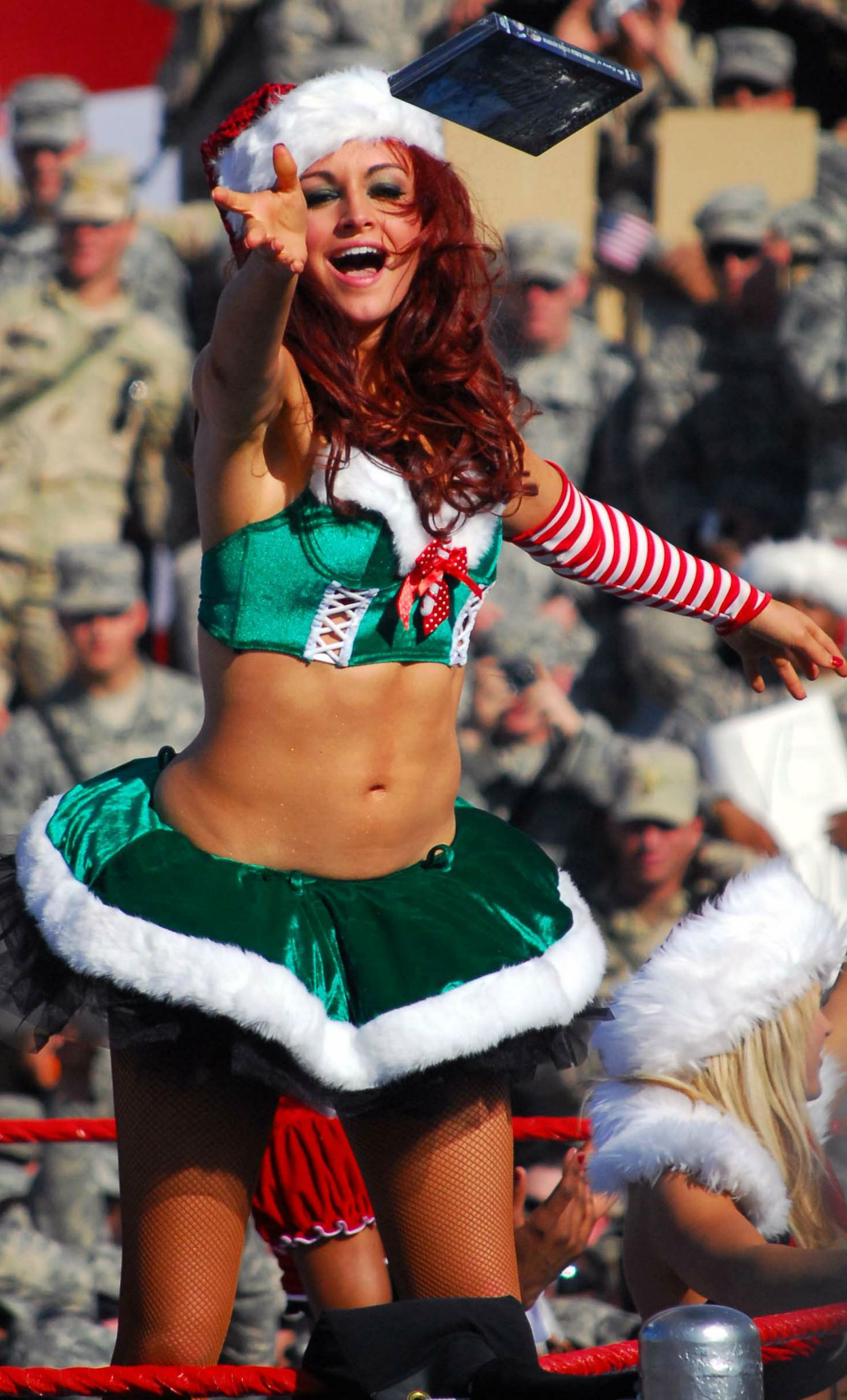
Maria Kanellis

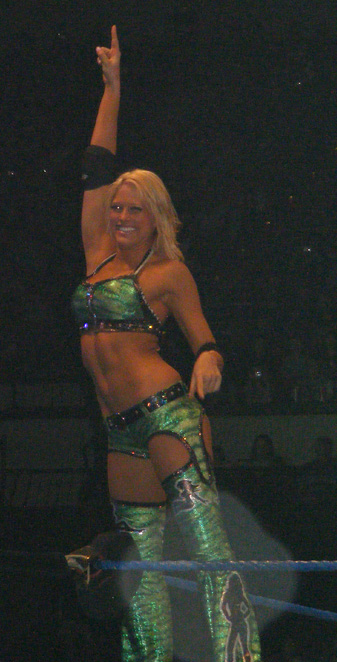
Kelly Kelly

Torrie Wilson and Stacy Keibler were extremely popular during years 2002–2005; 2007. Maria Kanellis and Kelly Kelly were loved as babyfaces during years 2005; 2006–2010; 2013.

WWE eventually re-introduced the Diva Search, in which Christy Hemme became the inaugural winner. In December 2004, Lita and Trish Stratus main-evented Raw for the Women's Championship, making it the second time in history for female talents to main event one of WWE's main shows. Moreover, Lita became the only female talent to main event Raw on three occasions including winning the Women's Championship.

Since mid-2004 and through various periods over the years until the year of 2011, most of the original female roster departed from the company, most notably in 2006, when Trish Stratus retired at Unforgiven and Lita retired at Survivor Series.

During this period, several women made their debut, like Melina, Mickie James, Beth Phoenix, and Layla.

On the March 5, 2007, episode of Raw, Mickie James and Melina competed in the first Falls Count Anywhere match to be contested between Divas. It was also the first time that the Women's Championship was contested in this type of match. At Vengeance: Night of Champions in 2007, Candice Michelle became the first woman from the WWE Diva Search contest to become the WWE Women's Champion. In December 2007, Trish Stratus, Lita, Molly Holly, and Sunny returned to WWE for a one-night special appearance on an episode of Raw due to the show's 15th anniversary. At One Night Stand 2008, Beth Phoenix and Melina competed in the first "I Quit" match to be contested between Divas.

=== PG Era and Divas Championship (2008–2012) ===
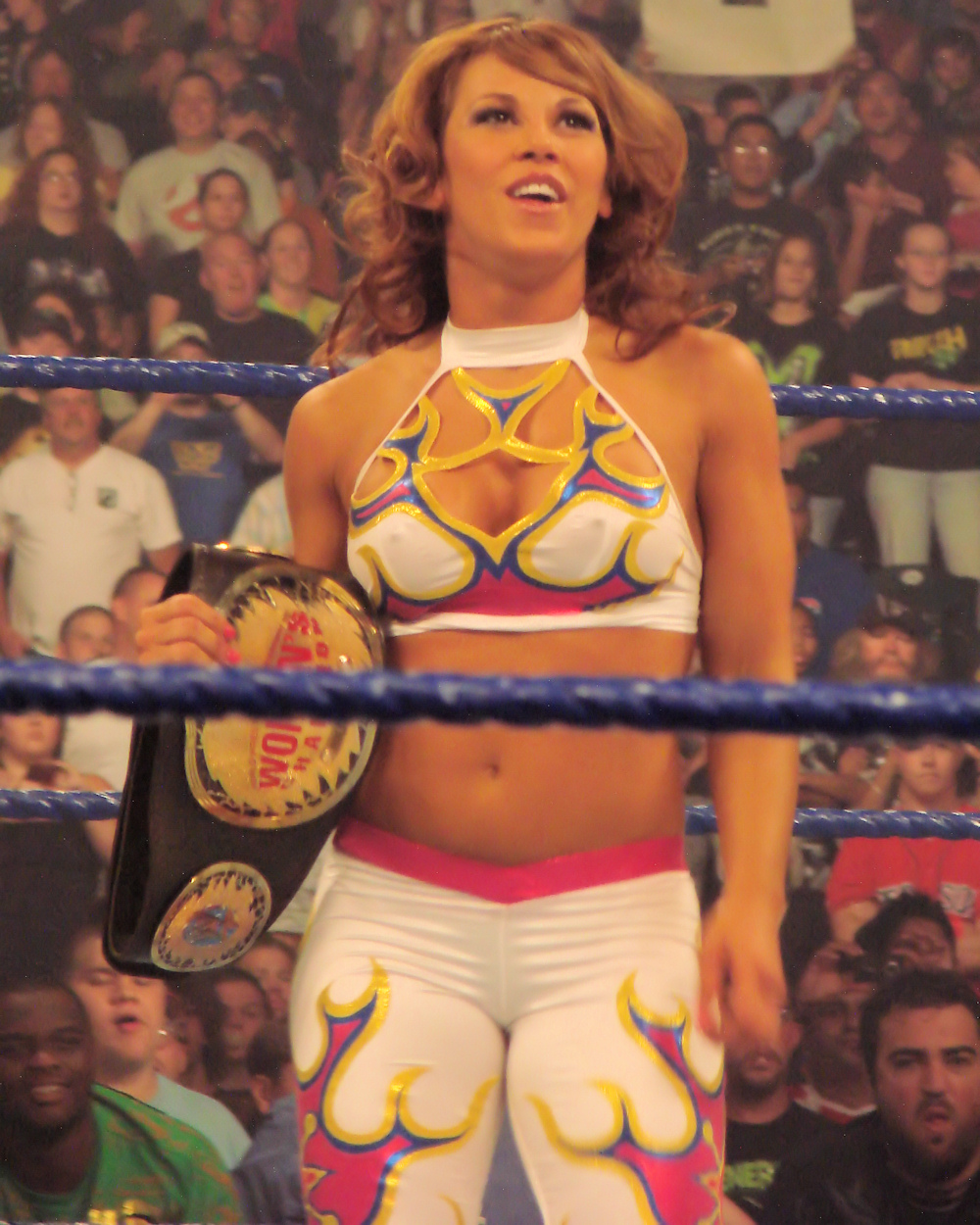
Mickie James five time winner of WWE Women's Championship

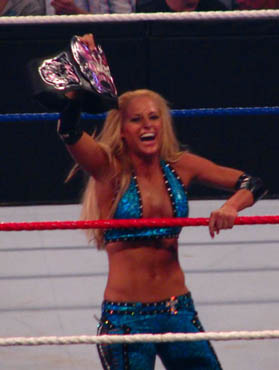
Michelle McCool, the inaugural and two-time WWE Divas Champion

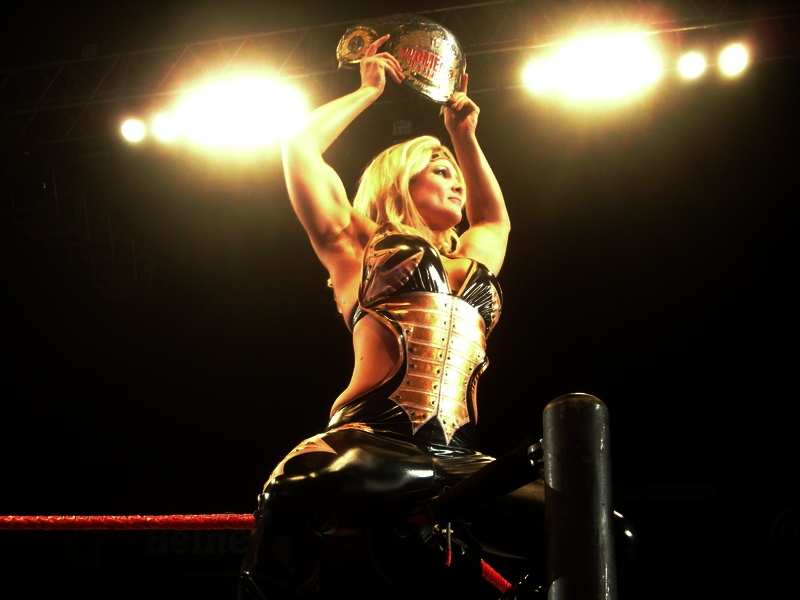
WWE Hall of Famer Beth Phoenix, three time WWE Women's Champion.

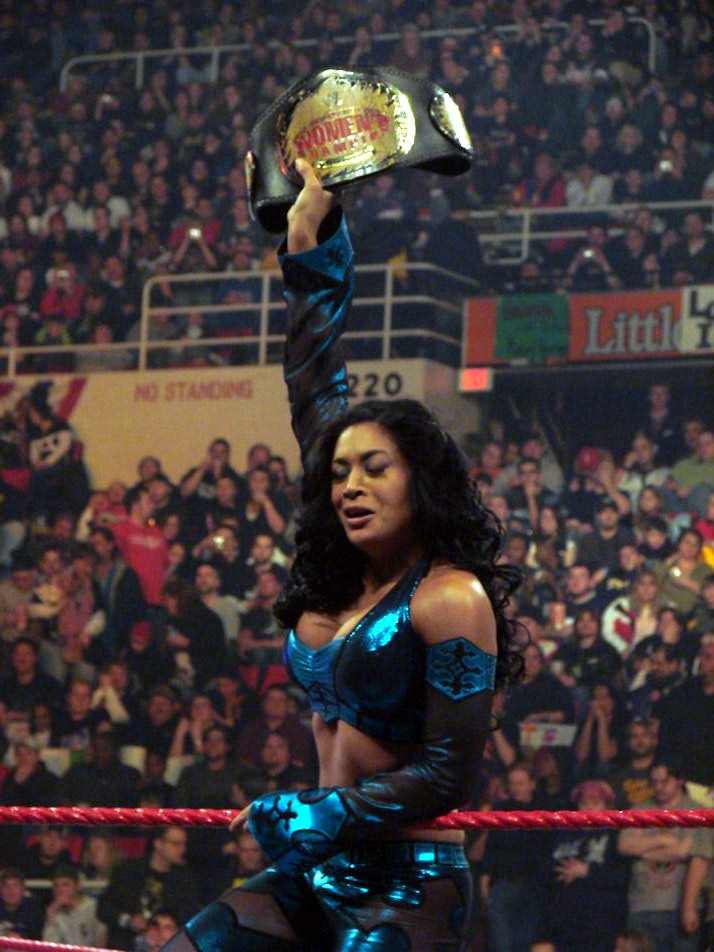
Melina Perez is a three-time WWE Women's Champion and a two-time WWE Divas Champion.

In 2008, WWE entered its PG Era and adapted a family-friendly format. WWE distanced itself from the sexual content that was pervasive throughout previous eras. However, the role of women within WWE during this time was criticized because their matches were not as integral to the show as male wrestler's matches were.

In March 2008, Mae Young became the third woman to be inducted into the WWE Hall of Fame. At The Great American Bash 2008, Michelle McCool defeated Natalya to become the inaugural holder of the WWE Divas Championship, a championship exclusive to the SmackDown brand. In January 2009, Victoria lost to Michelle McCool in her last match, leaving WWE shortly after. At Wrestlemania 25, several female WWE legends including Sunny, Molly Holly, Victoria and Torrie Wilson, alongside former Divas Joy Giovanni and Jackie Gayda made a one-night return to participate in the 25-Diva Battle Royal, which was won by 'Santina' Marella. The match was heavily criticized by several wrestling news outlets for its degrading booking of Divas in WWE. During the 2009 WWE draft, the championships switched brands after Women's Champion Melina was drafted to the SmackDown brand and Divas Champion Maryse was drafted to Raw. Beth Phoenix made history by becoming the second woman to compete at the Royal Rumble event that year and managed to eliminate The Great Khali. In March 2010, Wendi Richter was inducted into the Hall of Fame as part of the 2010 class, making her first appearance on the promotion in over 20 years. The Women's Championship was unified with the Divas Championship at Night of Champions 2010, as then Divas Champion Melina faced then-self-professed co-Women's Champion Michelle McCool (as part of LayCool with Layla) in a lumberjill match, which McCool won. This also made the Women's Championship defunct after 54 years, making Layla the final holder and only woman of Arab descent to have held the championship. During that year, Alicia Fox became the first and only African-American WWE Divas Champion.

NXT replaced ECW programming in 2010. Originally existing as a seasonal show which was presented as a hybrid between reality television and WWE's scripted live event shows, selected wrestlers from WWE's then-developmental territory Florida Championship Wrestling (FCW) participated in a competition to become WWE's next "breakout star". The third season, which aired in late 2010, featured only female contestants and was won by Kaitlyn.

In April 2011, Sunny was inducted into the Hall of Fame, becoming the fifth woman to receive the honor.

Kharma made her debut at Extreme Rules 2011 by attacking Michelle McCool, and attacked other divas over the next couple weeks on Raw and SmackDown, however this was cut short as she was granted a maternity leave due to her real-life pregnancy. 2011 saw the departures of Maryse and Michelle McCool, the latter of whom retired from WWE on May 1, after losing to Layla in a Loser Leaves WWE match; Melina, who was released in early August; and Gail Kim resigned from the company due to frustration with their lack of focus on the women's division.

At Royal Rumble 2012, Kharma returned and entered the Royal Rumble, becoming the third woman to enter the match. On the April 23, 2012, episode of Raw, Nikki Bella defeated Beth Phoenix in a lumberjill match for the Divas Championship, ending Phoenix's reign as champion at 204 days. Layla returned from her injury on April 29, 2012, at Extreme Rules and defeated Nikki Bella to become the fifth woman to have held both titles. The Bella Twins' contracts expired the following night, where they were fired by Eve Torres in the storyline.

On July 9, 2012, Eve Torres and AJ Lee became the first Divas to main event Raw since Trish Stratus and Lita in 2004, in a tag team match alongside CM Punk and Daniel Bryan. During mid-2012, AJ became involved in various relationship storylines with several male wrestlers such as CM Punk, Daniel Bryan, Kane, John Cena and Dolph Ziggler, including a stint as the General Manager of Raw. The later part of 2012 saw the departures of Kharma, Kelly Kelly, and Beth Phoenix. A month after Phoenix's October departure, WWE published an article on their website claiming that there was a new era for the Divas division.

In the summer of 2012, the WWE hired veteran independent wrestler Sara Amato as a trainer for the women. Under Amato's guidance, catfights and hair-pulling were eliminated and were replaced by strikes, forearms, punches, and kicking just like the male wrestlers were taught to do.

=== Beginning of Total Divas (2013–2015) ===
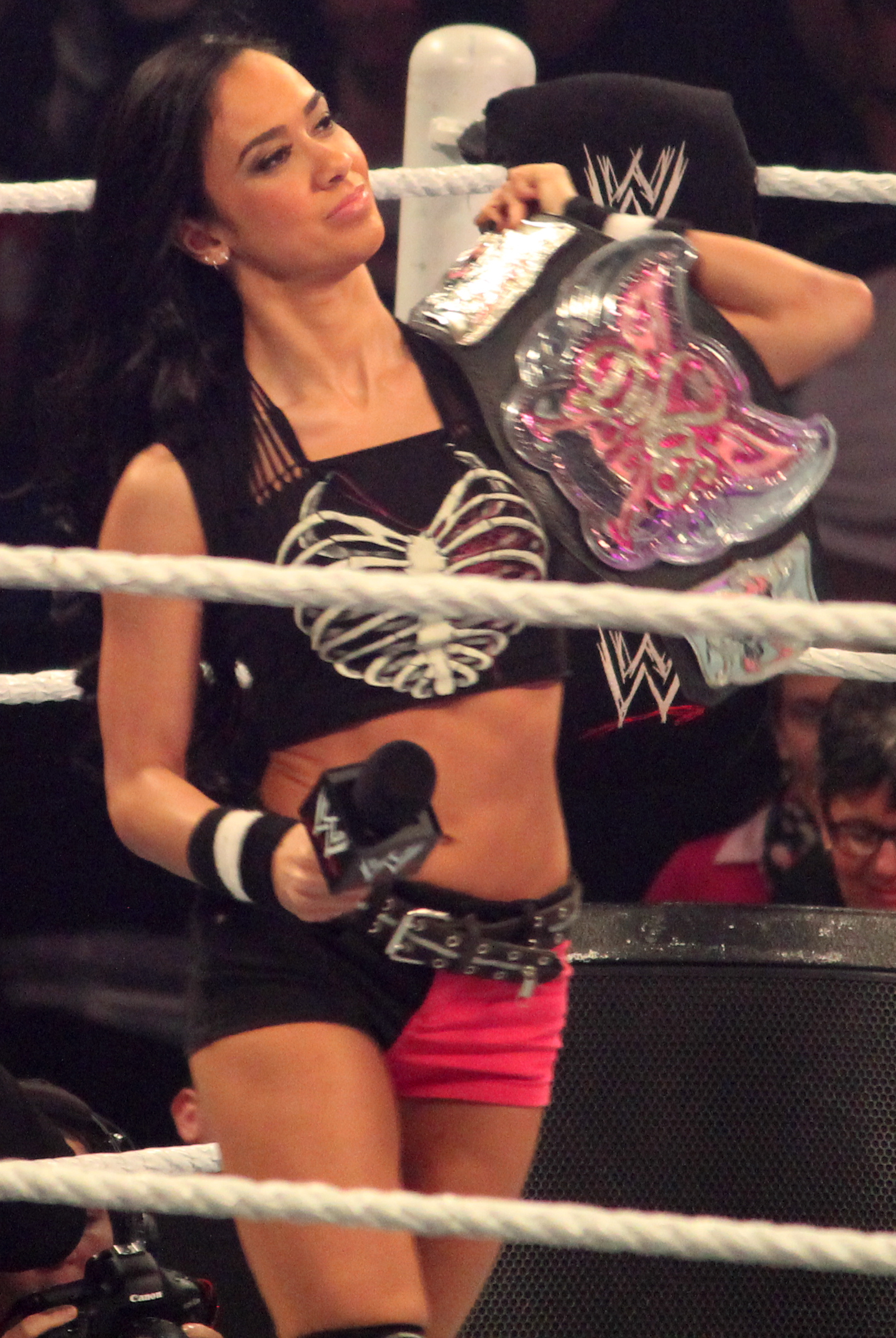
AJ Lee tied Eve Torres at three in September 2014. She is the second longest reigning WWE Divas Champion at 295 Days. She was also the first and only woman to defend & retain the WWE Divas Championship at WrestleMania.

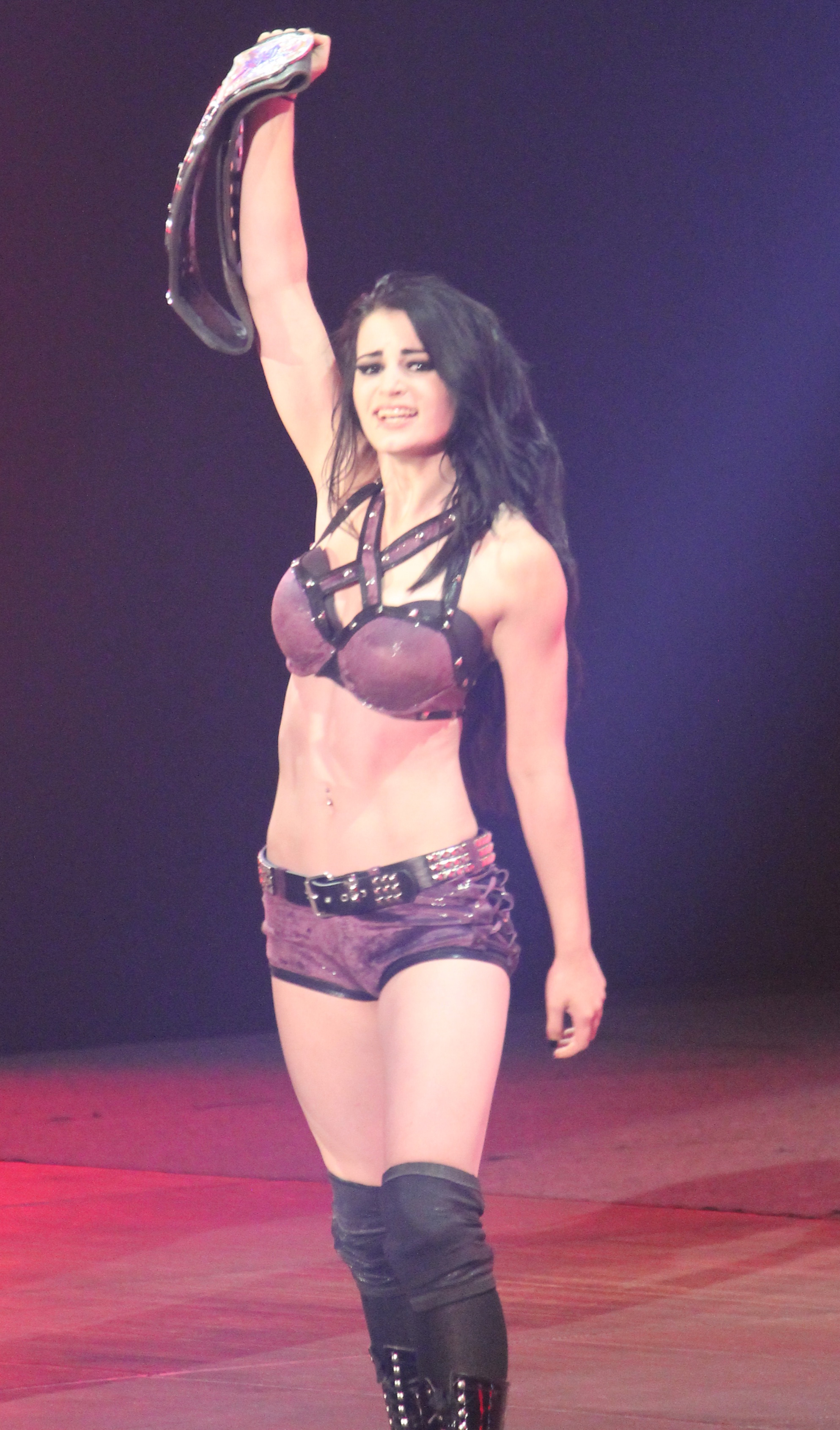
Paige was the youngest Divas Champion and inaugural NXT Women's Champion, and briefly held the titles concurrently

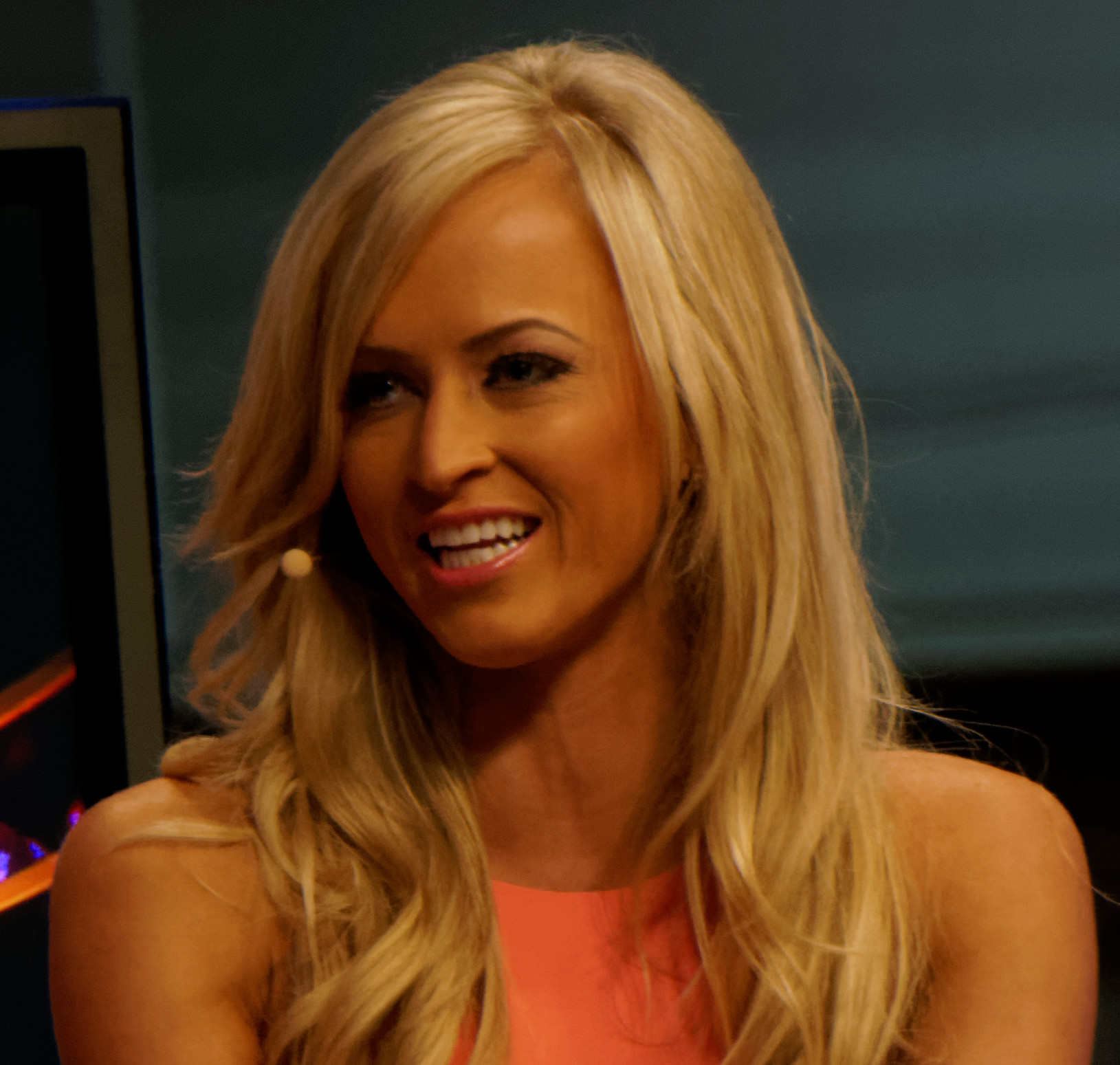
Summer Rae was the first Diva from NXT to be called up to the main roster.

The 20th anniversary of Raw on January 14, 2013, saw Kaitlyn defeat Eve Torres for the Divas Championship. Eve departed the company later that night after her contract expired. The Bella Twins returned to WWE on the March 11, 2013, episode of Raw. Kaitlyn lost her Divas Championship to her former tag team partner AJ Lee on Payback, ending her reign at 153 days. The first in-ring Divas contract signing took place on the July 12, 2013, episode of SmackDown between AJ Lee and Kaitlyn, as part of buildup for a rematch of the Divas Championship at Money In the Bank. AJ defeated Kaitlyn to retain the title at the event.

In August 2012, WWE ceased operating FCW, its developmental promotion in Tampa, Florida, deactivating FCW titles, and began running all of its developmental events and operations at Full Sail University under the "WWE NXT" banner. In October 2012, WWE hired Renee Young, and in September 2013, Young made her commentary debut on NXT, making her the first female on-air commentator in the company in over a decade.

In April 2013, Summer Rae made her main roster debut, becoming the first Diva to be called up from the rebranded NXT. In July 2013, the first season of the Total Divas reality television show starring WWE Divas premiered. On the August 26 episode of Raw, AJ Lee cut a worked shoot promo on the cast of Total Divas, stemming again, but partially from the controversial issue of what makes a "true" WWE Diva and the theme of the show leading towards a feud between Lee and the cast. At the 2013 Slammy Awards show, the Diva of the Year award was won by Brie and Nikki Bella. On January 8, 2014, Kaitlyn decided to depart from WWE to pursue other endeavors, losing her last match against her former friend and rival Divas Champion AJ Lee. Later on towards the end of the month, AJ Lee became the longest reigning Divas Champion in history, surpassing Maryse's reign of 216 days. On the March 12 episode of Main Event, Lee successfully defended the Divas Championship against Natalya, in a match that lasted fourteen minutes—the longest women's championship match since 1987. On the March 24 episode of Raw, it was announced by Vickie Guerrero that Lee would defend her Divas Championship against the entire Divas roster at WrestleMania XXX, making it the first time the title was defended at WrestleMania. At the event, AJ Lee retained her championship by forcing Naomi to submit.

On the post-WrestleMania episode of Raw on April 7, 2014, Paige made her debut on the main roster and defeated AJ Lee for the Divas Championship ending her record reign at 295 days. At the time, Paige was also the reigning (and first) NXT Women's Champion, having won the belt on June 20, 2013, after defeating Emma in the tournament finals to crown the inaugural champion. With her Divas Championship win, Paige became the first wrestler to simultaneously hold both titles, as well as becoming the youngest Divas Champion in WWE history at the age of 21. Lana also made her debut as the manager of Rusev, aiding him his first victory on the main roster against Zack Ryder. Shortly after, the duo adopted a Russophillic, anti-American gimmick.

Brie Bella entered a storyline with Stephanie McMahon at Payback — as part of her husband Daniel Bryan's storyline with McMahon — McMahon threatened to fire Bella if, an injured, Bryan did not relinquish the WWE World Heavyweight Championship, which forced Brie to "quit" before slapping McMahon in the face. In mid-June, Vickie Guerrero departed mutually from WWE, after losing to Stephanie McMahon in a pudding match. AJ Lee returned after a two-month hiatus, defeating Paige in an impromptu match to regain the Divas Championship as both then traded the championship until at SummerSlam, then Night of Champions. At SummerSlam, Stephanie McMahon defeated Brie Bella in her first match in ten years, after Nikki Bella attacked her sister. This led to a match between the twins at Hell in a Cell, where the loser was forced to become the winner's personal assistant for 30 days, where Nikki defeated Brie. AJ Lee won the Divas Championship for a record-tying third time at Night of Champions against Paige and Nikki Bella. With this win, AJ Lee tied with Eve Torres for the most reigns ever at three.

Nikki Bella received her title match against AJ Lee on November 23 at Survivor Series, which she won, with Brie's help, to become a two-time Divas Champion. The duo had reconciled at this point.

=== Divas Revolution (2015–2016) ===
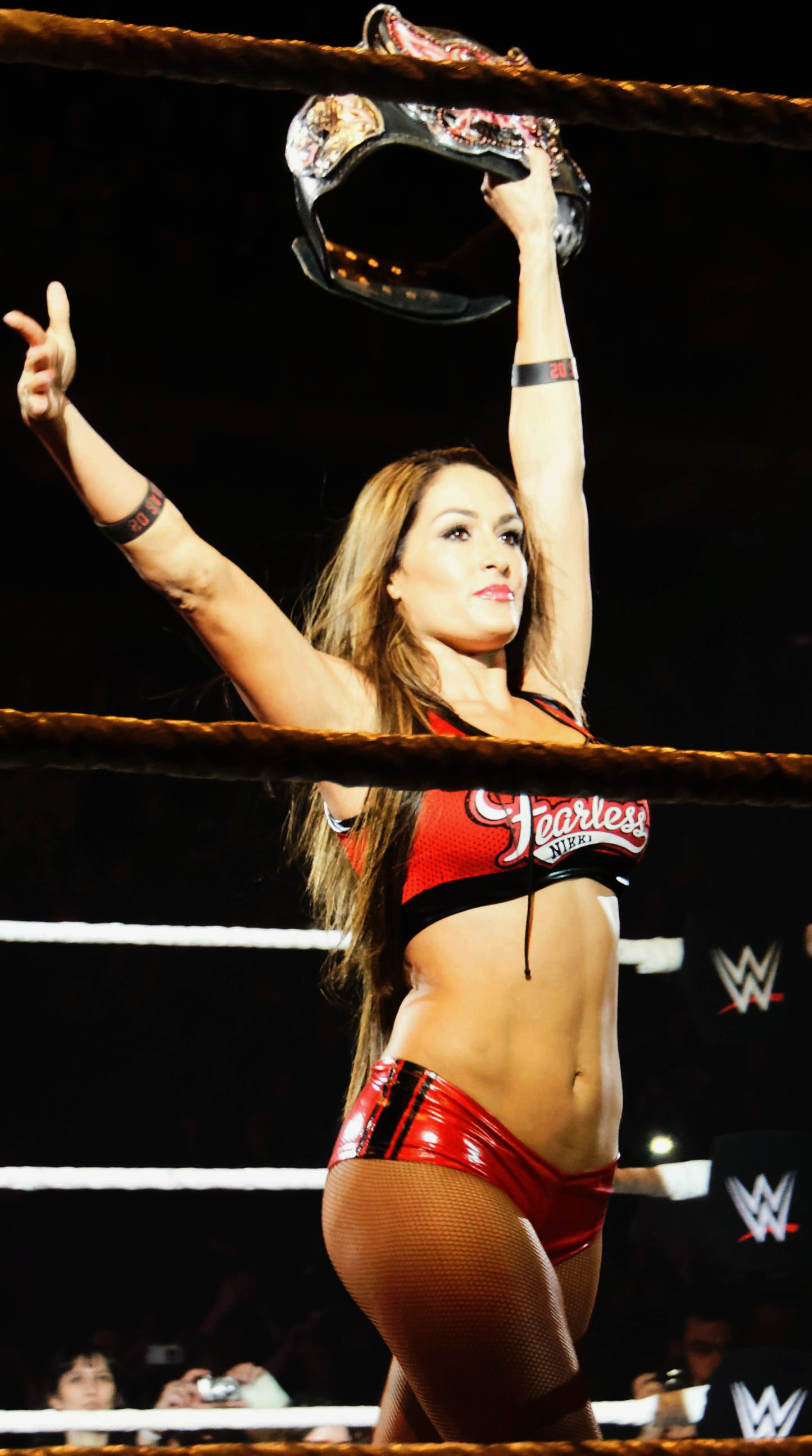
Nikki Bella is the longest-reigning Divas Champion at 301 days and is the only member of Total Divas to hold the title while on the cast.

On the February 23, 2015, episode of Raw, The Bella Twins faced Paige and Emma in a widely criticized match that lasted around 30 seconds. After the match, a hashtag on Twitter trended worldwide for around a day and a half, called #GiveDivasAChance. This hashtag brought attention to various multi-media outlets over the long-tenured controversy over the company's treatment of their women's division, including AJ Lee who publicly criticized Stephanie McMahon over the issue. On April 3, five days after Lee and Paige defeated the Bella Twins at WrestleMania 31, WWE announced that Lee decided to retire from in-ring competition and departed from the company. In June, Paige started serving as a judge on the sixth season of Tough Enough, while Renee Young appeared as co-host of the show and Lita served as a coach.

On the July 13 episode of Raw, Nikki Bella claimed that there were no challengers for her championship. As a result, Stephanie McMahon proclaimed a revolution in the women's division and introduced Charlotte, Becky Lynch, and the NXT Women's Champion Sasha Banks as the newest additions to the main roster. In the following weeks, a three-way feud began between Team B.A.D. (Naomi, Tamina and Sasha Banks), Team Bella (Alicia Fox and The Bella Twins) and Team PCB (Paige, Charlotte, and Becky Lynch), with the latter team being renamed from Submission Sorority due to links to adult content. The three teams faced off at SummerSlam in a three team elimination match, where Becky pinned Brie to win the match for Team PCB.

On July 29, WWE announced that Layla would depart from the company and retire. On the August 31 episode of Raw, Nikki introduced the Bellatron timer which counted down the remaining time until she surpassed the record for the longest-reigning Divas champion of all time. Charlotte won the first Beat the Clock Challenge for a title shot. Her title match with Nikki was initially advertised for Night of Champions, but instead took place the Raw preceding the pay-per-view, after Charlotte issued a petition, granted later by The Authority, to face Nikki before she surpassed the record to become the longest-reigning Divas Champion. Charlotte won the match by disqualification when Brie and Nikki switched places and Charlotte pinned Brie. However, since the title could not change hands by disqualification, Nikki retained the championship, and in the process, became the longest-reigning Divas Champion in history, surpassing AJ Lee's previous record of 295 days. Several days later, on September 20 at Night of Champions, Nikki lost the championship to Charlotte, ending her reign at 301 days. Shortly after, Nikki went on a hiatus from television due to a neck injury which would require surgery, but returned for one night on December 21, to accept the Slammy Award for Diva of the Year.

=== Women's Evolution (2016–present) ===
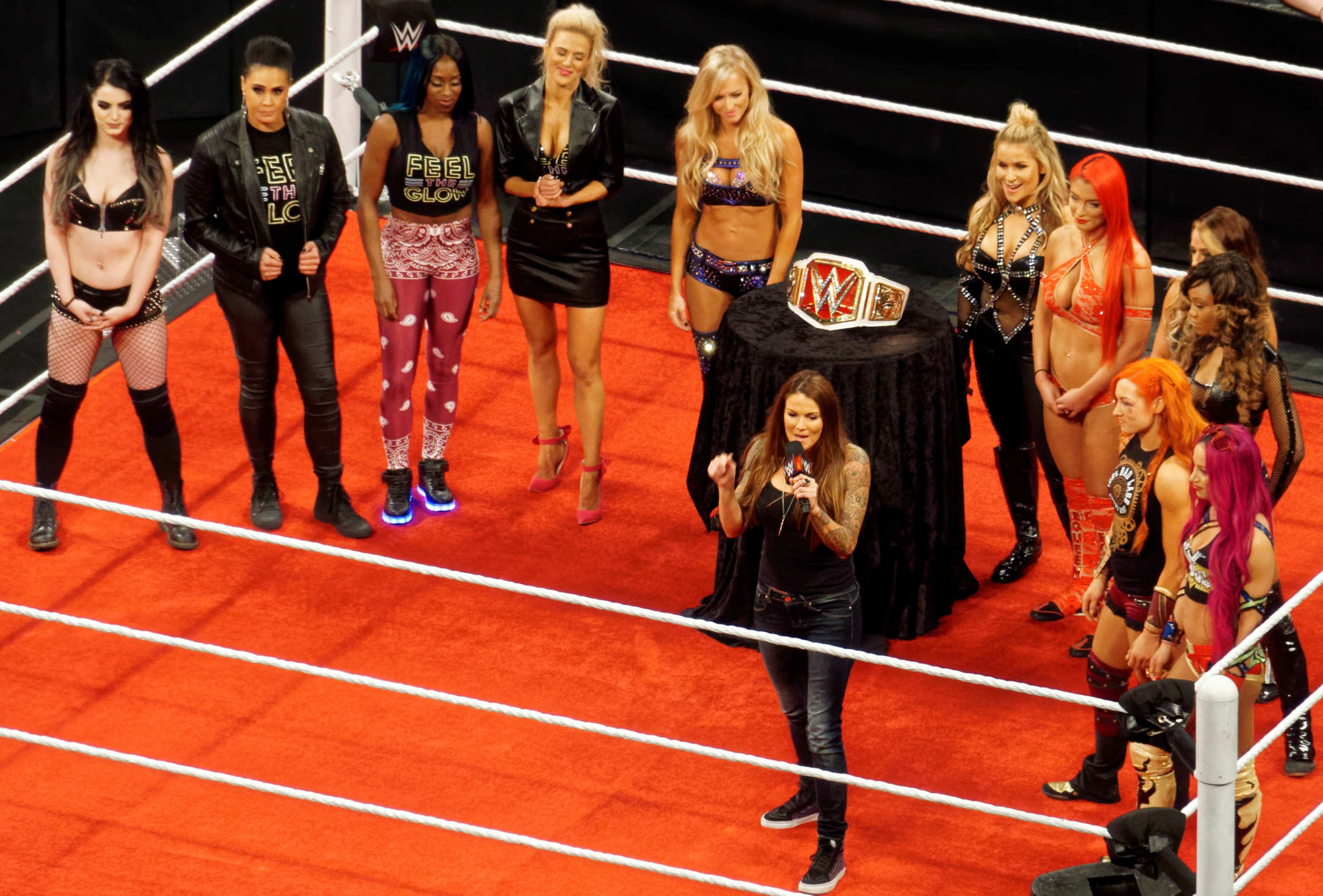
Lita presenting the WWE Women's Championship (2016–2023 version) on Raw in April 2016

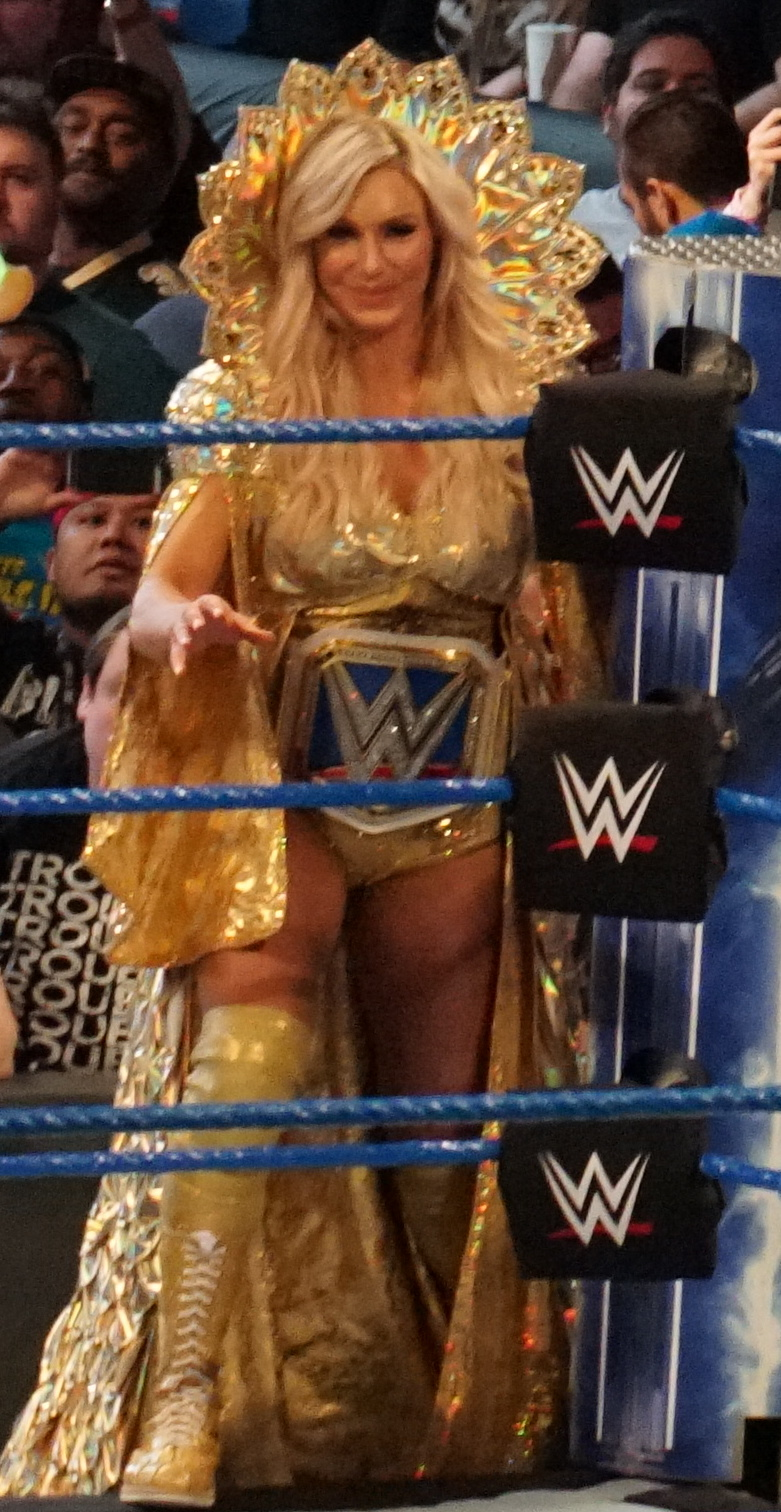
Charlotte Flair, the forerunner of the Women's Evolution, making her entrance in 2018 while WWE SmackDown Women's Champion

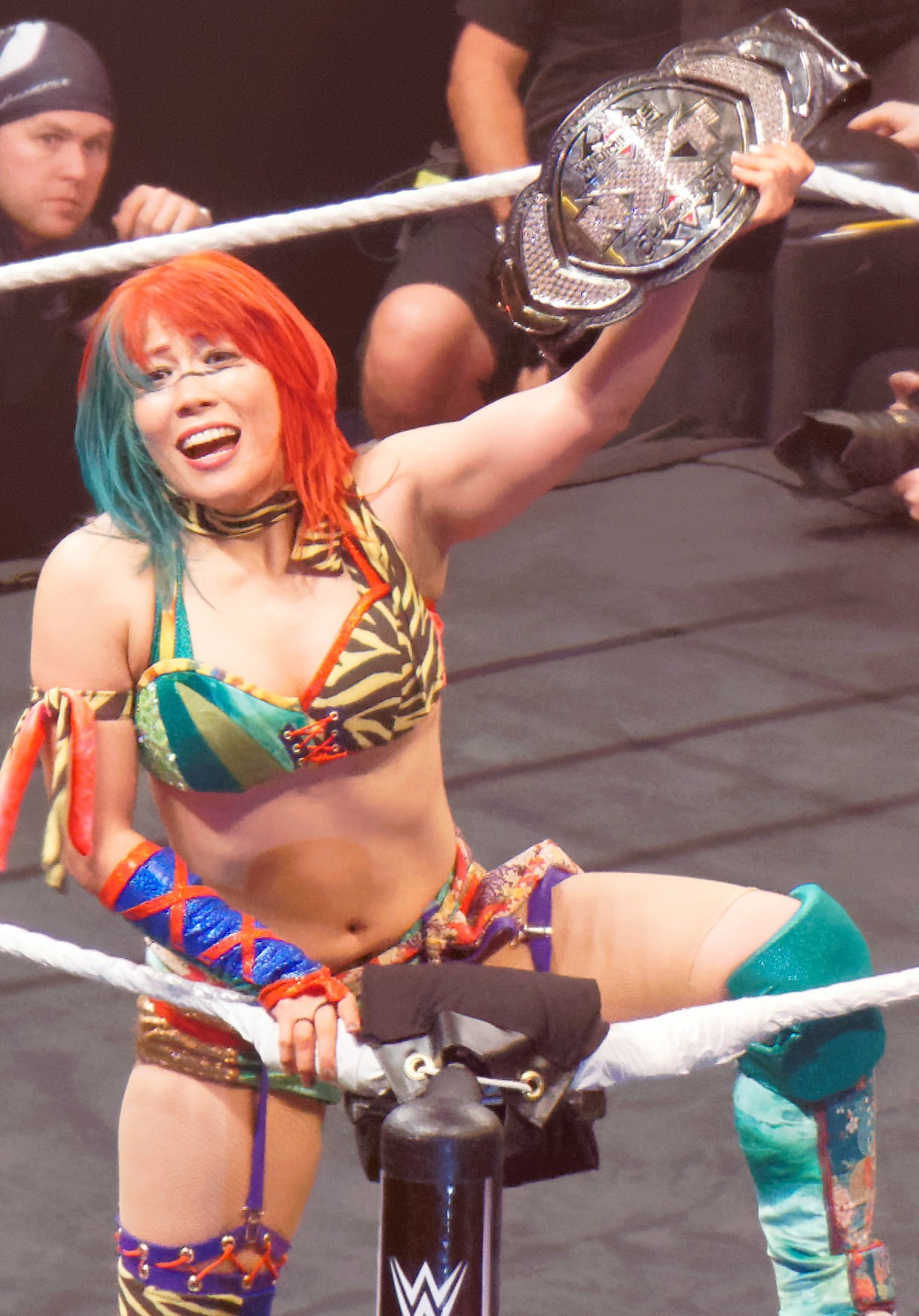
Asuka, the inaugural winner of the Women's Royal Rumble and is considered to have the longest undefeated streak in WWE history

At WrestleMania 32 in April 2016, WWE announced a major re-launch of its women's division: the "Divas" moniker was dropped, with the company now promoting its female talent as "Superstars" as with their male counterparts. Lita made an appearance to unveil a new WWE Women's Championship belt; ultimately retiring the WWE Divas Championship, the new title shares its name with the original Women's Championship, but does not share the same title history as the original. WWE acknowledges the original championship as its predecessor. Later in the show, Divas champion Charlotte won the new championship by defeating Lynch and Banks.

WWE had faced criticism from critics and performers for having portrayed female wrestlers as a source of sex appeal, rather than showcasing their athletic prowess. Stephanie McMahon explained that the changes were part of a move towards gender equality within the company by dropping the "derogatory" Divas title, and thereby placing its entire roster on a "level playing field" as "Superstars". In the years that followed the relaunch, the increased prominence of the women's division in WWE programming, events, and reality series had helped to, in turn, attract more female viewers to WWE programming; McMahon stated that "Women love action, but I think they also really love the stories. They love the characters, they love the drama. Women need a reason to watch, more so than men I think, so the more you can get your female audience engaged in the character and in the story, then they care. They care about who's going to win, they care about who's going to lose." It was also at the same time that WWE's hiring policy regarding female talents changed as independent wrestlers (particularly from the likes of Shimmer, Shine and WSU), mixed-martial artists and athletes have gradually been replacing fitness and swimsuit models due to Triple H replacing John Laurinaitis as WWE's Head of Talent. In addition, women began to receive more multi-dimensional characters as well.

In April 2016 at a show in Dubai, Alicia Fox became the first female performer in WWE history to appear in front of a live crowd in the Middle East. After the second brand split and the 2016 WWE draft on July 19, 2016, the WWE Women's Championship became exclusive to Raw. The SmackDown Women's Championship was subsequently unveiled during the September 11, 2016, episode of SmackDown, and won by Becky Lynch in a six-way elimination match at Backlash the following month. Throughout 2016, Charlotte Flair (who added her father's ring surname to her own ring name) and Sasha Banks feuded over the Raw Women's Championship. They main-evented Raw on two occasions that year, they competed in the first women's Hell in a Cell match in WWE history that same year, marking the first time that a women's match had headlined a WWE pay-per-view event.

In 2017 and 2018, WWE also began to promote women's Royal Rumble, Money in the Bank, Tables, Ladders, and Chairs, and Elimination Chamber matches for the first time. The inaugural winners of these events were Asuka, Carmella, Asuka once again and Alexa Bliss. On January 28, 2017, WWE announced that Nikki Bella would serve as an executive producer for Total Divas starting in the second half of the sixth season in April. Nikki would become the first female talent within the company to become a producer of a WWE-related show. On October 22, 2017, Asuka made her main roster debut at TLC, defeating Emma. Shortly after, WWE announced that Emma and Summer Rae were both released from their respective contracts. On November 20, Paige returned to RAW after a year of inactivity, alongside the debuting Mandy Rose and Sonya Deville, attacking Mickie James, Sasha Banks and Bayley. That year, WWE also held an inaugural women's tournament, the Mae Young Classic, and signed Jessika Carr as the first woman to be a full-time WWE referee.

Since then, there are generally at least two or more women's matches on RAW, SmackDown and NXT while it is increasingly rare for some episodes not to have a women's match on the show. In addition, promos and fights involving women have gotten more intense and violent compared to the Divas Era. Also, women's storylines began to move away from cattiness and romantic relationships with male wrestlers into more personal feuds as well as animosity between the two wrestlers as they closely begin to mirror men's storylines. On August 26, 2018, Rhea Ripley defeated Toni Storm in the United Kingdom Championship Tournament to win the inaugural NXT UK Women's Championship, which became the top women's championship of the NXT UK brand. On September 11, 2018, Maryse made her first match in over 7 years, facing Brie Bella in a no contest. On October 8, the returning Brie Bella and Nikki Bella attacked the then-Raw Women's Champion Ronda Rousey after defeating Ruby Riott, Liv Morgan and Sarah Logan, turning heel in the process and setting up a match for WWE Evolution. Hall of Famers Trish Stratus and Lita also made their return to face Mickie James and Alexa Bliss at the event. In October 2018, WWE hosted Evolution, its first-ever pay-per-view to consist only of women's matches. Executive vice president of talent, live events and creative Triple H stated that it "was simply the right time for this to happen", countering allegations that the event was a counterbalance for the subsequent Crown Jewel in Saudi Arabia (where WWE had not held women's matches due to the country's women's rights policies). In December 2018, a new WWE Women's Tag Team Championship was unveiled; it was contested for the first time at Elimination Chamber in February 2019, and won in a tag team Elimination Chamber match by Sasha Banks and Bayley.

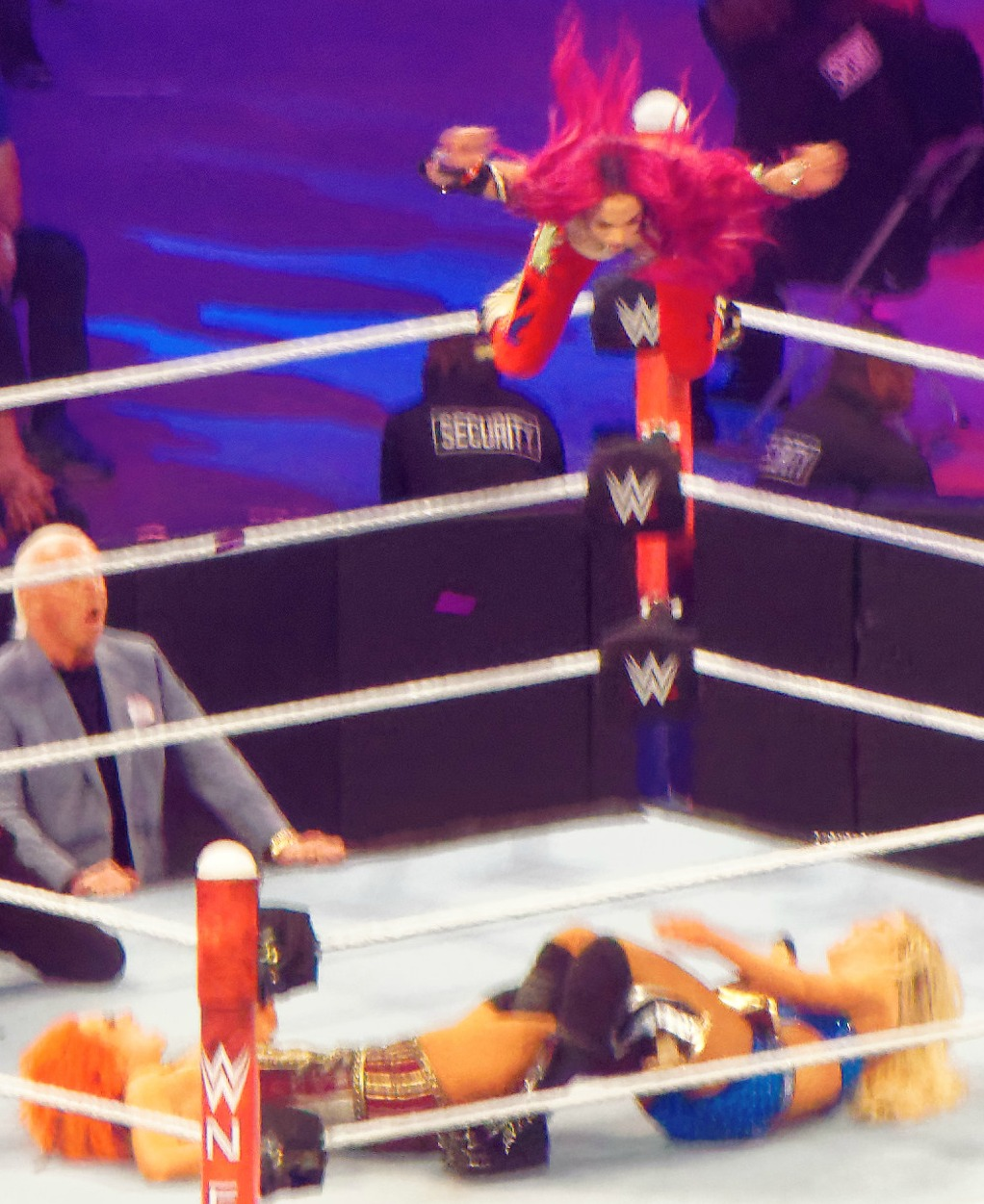
Sasha Banks (top) performing the frog splash to Charlotte Flair (with Ric Flair) and Becky Lynch (left) at Wrestlemania 32

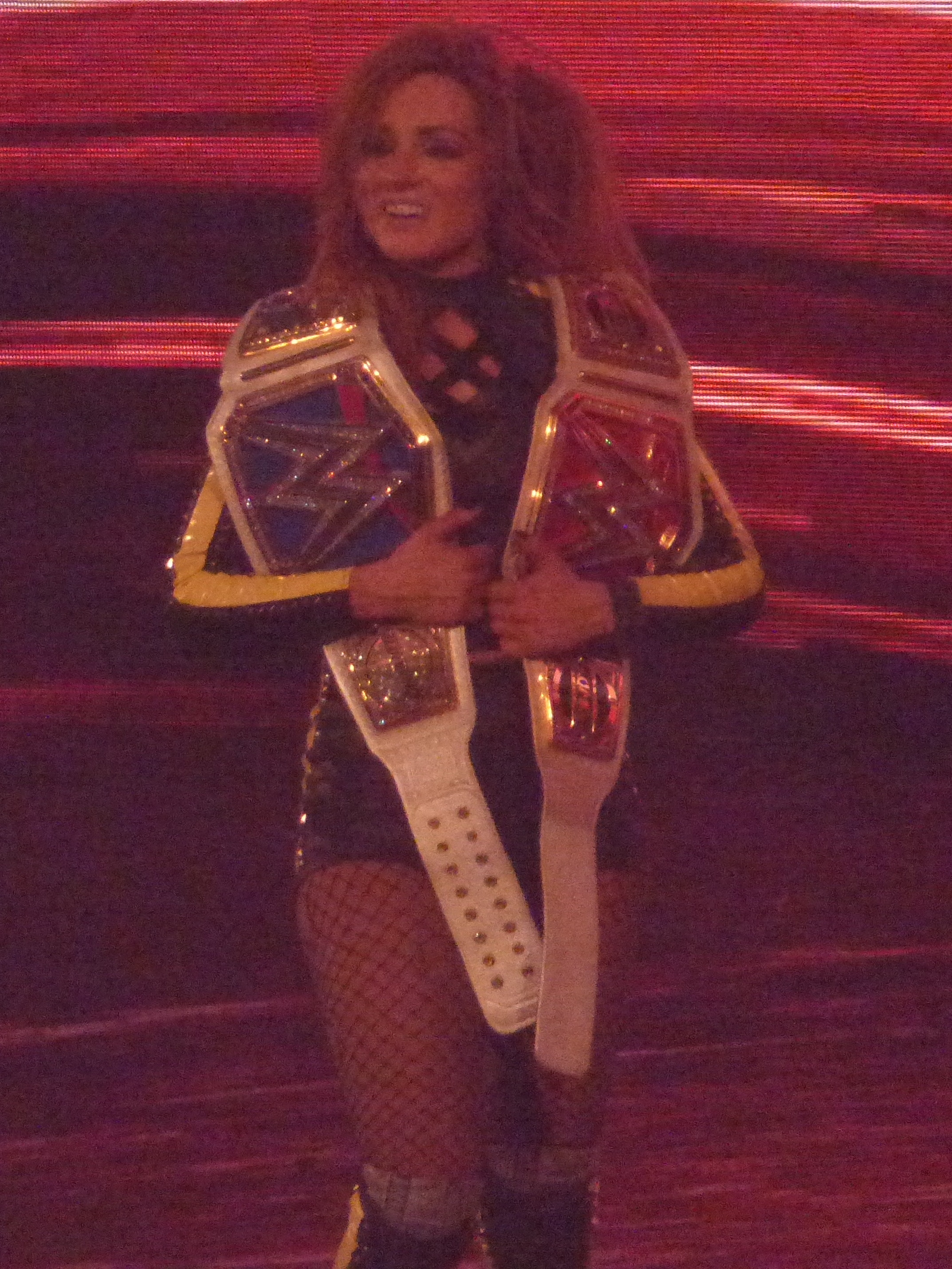
Lynch defeated both Ronda and Charlotte in the first WrestleMania Women's Main Event and is the only woman to hold the WWE Raw and WWE SmackDown Women's Championships concurrently

Amid a feud with Charlotte Flair after SummerSlam in 2018, Lynch began to refer to herself as "The Man"—adopting a persona of a poorly-treated underdog. The storyline coincided with a major increase in Lynch's popularity, and culminated with Lynch defeating the Raw and SmackDown's Women's Champions Ronda Rousey and Charlotte Flair in a winner takes all triple threat match at WrestleMania 35—marking the first women's main event in WrestleMania history. After 14 years with WWE, veteran wrestler Alicia Fox retired, returning to participate only at Royal Rumble events in the future. At Crown Jewel, Natalya and Lacey Evans competed in WWE's first women's match in Saudi Arabia. Later that year, Survivor Series held its first ever women's main event featuring Raw Women's Champion Becky Lynch, SmackDown Women's Champion Bayley and NXT Women's Champion Shayna Baszler, with the latter winning the match. In 2021, Sasha Banks and Bianca Belair became the first black women to jointly headline WrestleMania.

On January 6, 2021, at NXT New Year's Evil the first ever Women's Dusty Rhodes Tag Team Tournament was announced by NXT general manager William Regal and on February 14, 2021, in the tournament finals at NXT TakeOver: Vengeance Day the tournament was won by Raquel González and Dakota Kai as they defeated Ember Moon and Shotzi Blackheart. On March 10, 2021, after the tournament victory Raquel González and Dakota Kai were awarded the first ever NXT Women's Tag Team Championship's by NXT general manager William Regal making them the inaugural championship holders.

During the late year of 2021 the first ever WWE Queen's Crown tournament was announced. The tournament is a female version of the company's King of the Ring tournament. On October 21, 2021, Zelina Vega defeated Doudrop to become the inaugural Queen's Crown at Crown Jewel in Saudi Arabia.

Also while the name "Diva" largely fell into disuse, the term was then reused in 2022 for NXT wrestler Quincy Eliott's moniker, "Super Diva".

On June 9, 2023, on an episode of SmackDown, the WWE Raw Women's Championship name was reverted to the WWE Women's Championship as to when Lita introduced it at WrestleMania 32, and then-current champion Asuka was awarded with a new title belt. On the June 12 episode of Raw, the WWE SmackDown Women's Championship was renamed to the Women's World Championship, and then-current champion Rhea Ripley was awarded with the new title belt.

On June 23, 2023, the WWE Women's Tag Team Championship's were unified with the NXT Women's Tag Team Championship's as Ronda Rousey and Shayna Baszler (WWE Women's Tag Team Champions) defeated Alba Fyre and Isla Dawn (NXT Women's Tag Team Champions) retiring the NXT Women's Tag Team Championships in an episode of SmackDown.

On July 17, 2023, Chelsea Green and Sonya Deville became the first WWE Tough Enough women contestants to win the WWE Women's Tag Team Championships in WWE history.

On April 6, 2024, at NXT Stand & Deliver, NXT general manager Ava announced the creation of the NXT Women's North American Championship. This is the first-ever secondary women's championship in WWE. On April 7, 2024, at WrestleMania XL, the WWE Queen's Crown tournament was renamed as the WWE Queen of the Ring tournament. The finals of the tournament took place at King and Queen of the Ring in Saudi Arabia which was won by Nia Jax, earning her a title shot at the WWE Women's Championship at SummerSlam.

On June 9, 2024, at NXT Battleground Kelani Jordan became the inaugural NXT Women's North American Champion as she defeated Sol Ruca, Lash Legend, Fallon Henley, Jaida Parker and Michin in a 6-Women Ladder match.

On May 1, 2024, WWE Chief Content Officer Triple H confirmed that WWE TV show WWE Speed that was established April 3, 2024, which air's on Twitter would also feature women's matches; this led to an official announcement on August 9, 2024, where he announced that the tournament for the first ever WWE Speed Women's Championship will begin on September 4, 2024. The title is a women's version of the WWE Speed Championship which was inauguracely won by Ricochet. In the tournament final that occurred during the Speed tapings on October 4, 2024, SmackDown's Candice LeRae defeated Raw's Iyo Sky to become the inaugural champion. On the November 8, 2024, episode of SmackDown, SmackDown GM Nick Aldis introduced the WWE Women's United States Championship belt. On the November 25, 2024, episode of RAW, the WWE Women's Intercontinental Championship belt was unveiled by RAW GM Adam Pearce. On December 14, 2024, at Saturday Night's Main Event Chelsea Green was crowned the inaugural WWE Women's United States Champion when she defeated Michin in the WWE Women's United States Championship Tournament finals. On the January 13, 2025, episode of Raw Lyra Valkyria defeated Dakota Kai to become the inaugural WWE Women's Intercontinental Champion in the tournament finals.

During a press conference on February 18, 2025, WWE's Chief Content Officer, "Triple H", unveiled WWE Women's ID Championship (And the WWE ID Championship for the men.) The titles were designed to be defended exclusively across the independent circuit, offering emerging talent increased exposure and opportunities in the WWE Independent Development (ID) program.

On May 7, 2025, "Triple H", introduced the WWE Evolve Women's Championship (Alongside the men's version called the WWE Evolve Championship.) as a new rookie title for the WWE rookie division for the new WWE rookie brand WWE Evolve brand. On May 28, 2025 Kali Armstrong, defeated Wendy Choo, Kendal Grey, and Kylie Rae, in a fatal four-way elimination match to become the inaugural champion on Evolve (the date this episode was taped is unknown).

==== Reception ====
While Stephanie McMahon credited Triple H and Vince McMahon as the creators of the Women's Revolution, wrestler Gail Kim countered that Total Nonstop Action Wrestling was the promotion where the Women's Revolution began. Former WWE wrestler Maria Kanellis was critical of how WWE portrays women, stating that it feels more like a "promotional tactic". After being released in 2021, Mickie James said that one WWE executive told her: "Women's wrestling doesn't make money" in response to her push for a second all-female pay-per-view or an all-female branded show.

== Promotional pushes ==
The popularity of the women of WWE has resulted in various cross-promotions. Various female talent in WWE have posed in Playboy, others have appeared in commercials for WWE and non-WWE products as well as men's interest magazines.

Women in WWE would participate in annual photoshoots every year, travelling to a foreign destination. The photoshoot would be followed by a magazine, featuring photos from the shoot as well as a television special or video release of highlights from the shoot. The first initial annual photoshoot was in 1999 in Santa Fe, New Mexico, which was promoted through video release by WWE entitled Come Get Some: The Women of the WWF. Debra, Chyna, Sable, Tori, Jacqueline, Terri Runnels, Ivory, Luna Vachon, and Ryan Shamrock were part of the photoshoot and promotional material.

=== Videography ===
Annual photoshoots:

- 1999: Come Get Some: The Women of the WWF
- 2000: Postcard from the Caribbean
- 2001: Divas in Hedonism
- 2002: Tropical Pleasure and Undressed
- 2003: Desert Heat
- 2004: South of the Border
- 2005: Viva Las Divas
- 2006: Divas Do New York
- 2007: Los Angeles
- 2008: Summer Skin

Other:

- 1998: Sable Unleashed
- 1999: Chyna & Triple H: It's Our Time
- 2000: Chyna Fitness: More Than Meets the Eye
- 2001: Lita: It Just Feels Right
- 2003: Trish Stratus: 100% Stratusfaction Guaranteed
- 2005: $250,000 Raw Diva Search
- 2014: Stephanie McMahon: Fit Series
- 2018: Then, Now, Forever: The Evolution of WWE's Women's Division
- 2019: Trish & Lita: Best Friends, Better Rivals

=== Playboy ===
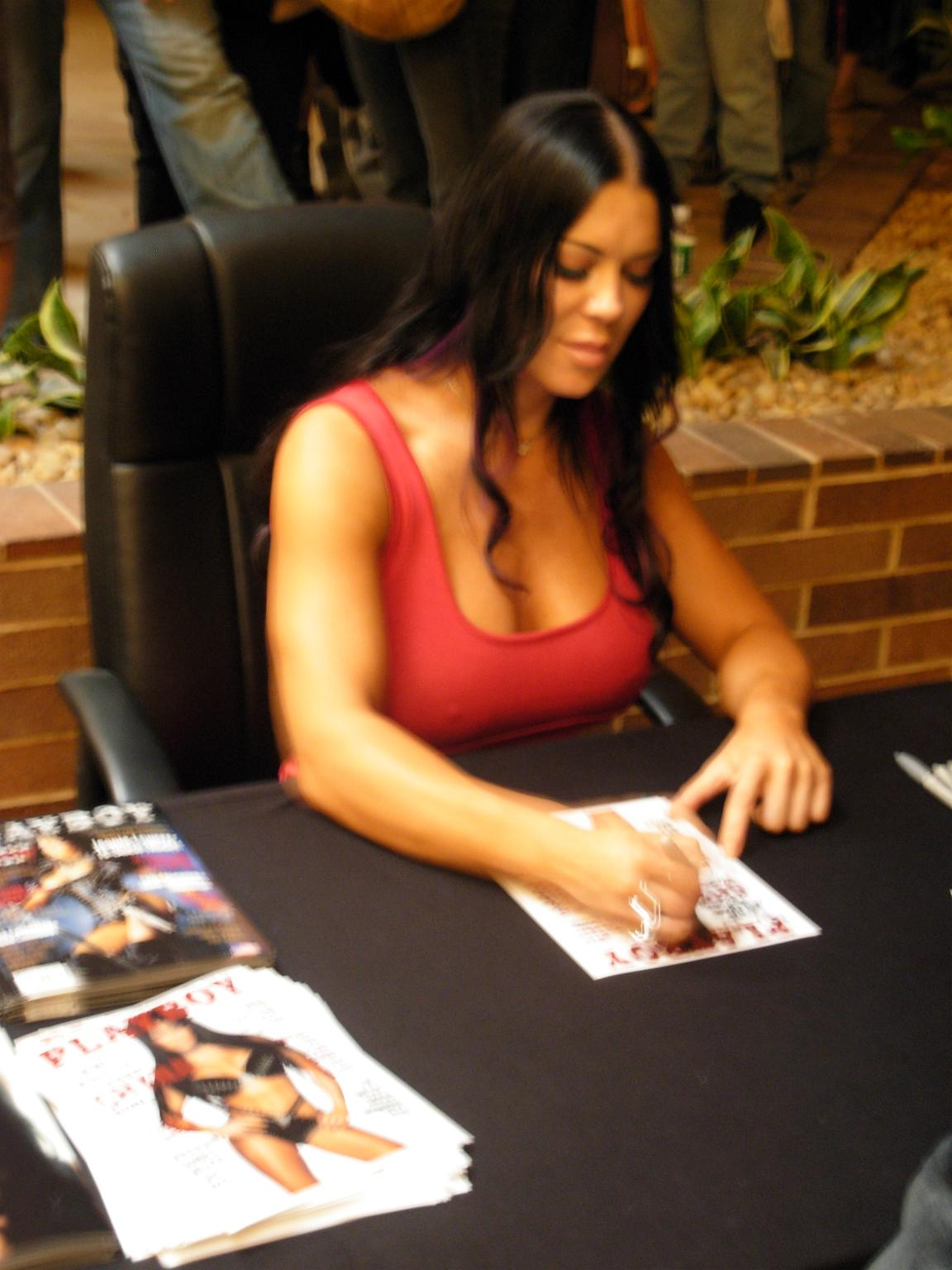
Chyna autographing her issue of Playboy in 2007.

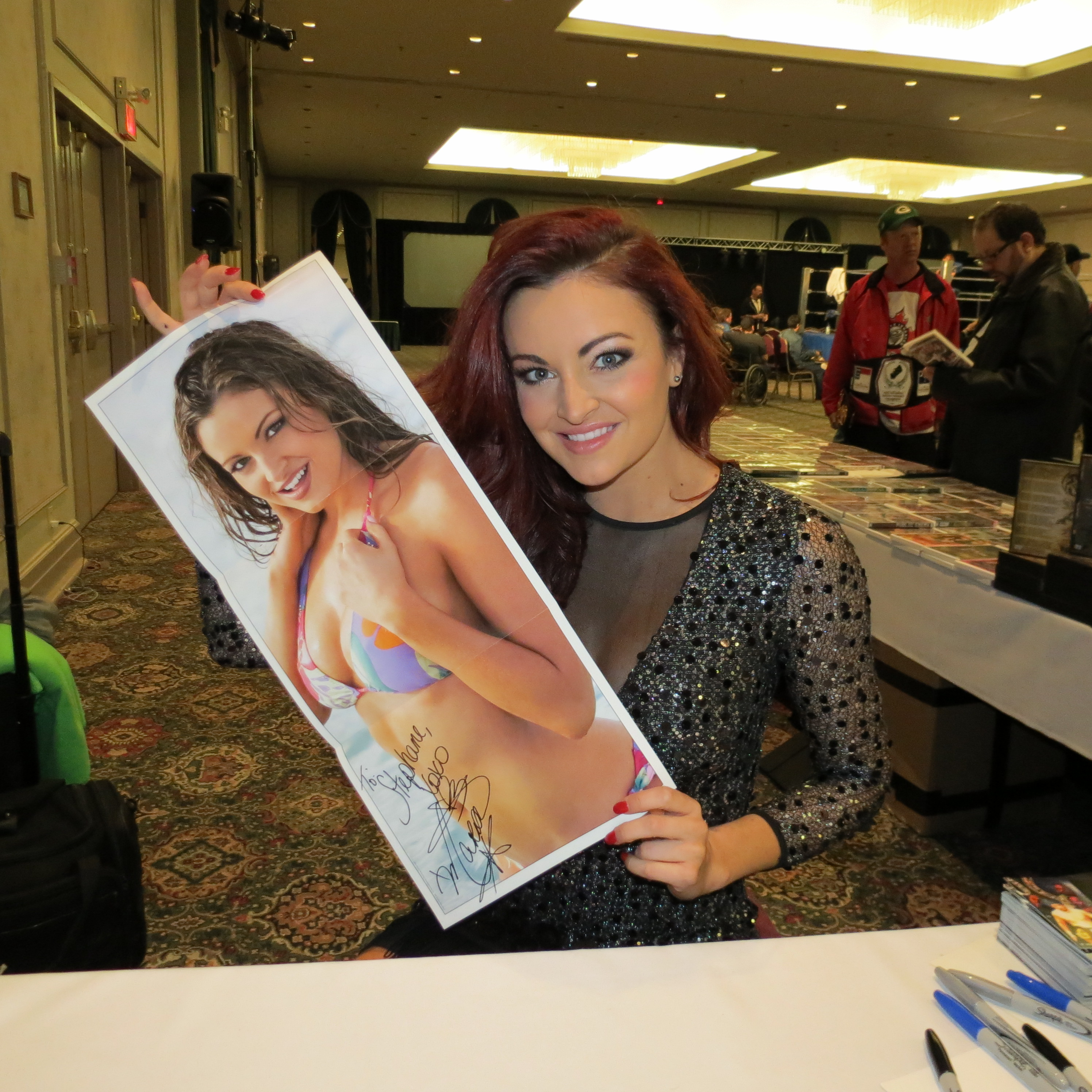
Maria Kanellis is the last WWE diva to pose for Playboy.

Since 1999, seven women in WWE have appeared on the cover of Playboy:

- 1999: Sable (2) - April & September
- 2000: Chyna - November
- 2002: Chyna (2) - January
- 2003: Torrie Wilson - March
- 2004: Torrie Wilson (2) and Sable (3) - March
- 2005: Christy Hemme - April
- 2006: Candice Michelle - April
- 2007: Ashley Massaro - April
- 2008: Maria Kanellis - April

Playboy playmates, such as Carmella DeCesare and Karen McDougal have also appeared in the 2004 Diva Search contest. Former WWE female talent Taryn Terrell and current female talent Maryse have also posed nude for the magazine. Female talents such as Trish Stratus, Lita, Debra, Sharmell, Stacy Keibler, Michelle McCool, and Melina Perez have said that posing for Playboy magazine is out of the question for them. Trish Stratus appeared on Canadian sports talk show Off The Record and said that she did not pose because she wanted to be known as "multiple time Women's Champion Trish Stratus" rather than "the girl who posed in Playboy". Stratus also claims that she refused the shoot because she says she can still be sexy without taking her clothes off. Lita has said that she did not pose because she felt it was wrong for her as a role model for young girls to pose for the magazine.

Shortly following Maria's pictorial, WWE transitioned to a TV-PG rating and ended its connection to Playboy as part of the move.

=== Reality shows ===
==== Diva Search (2003–2007, 2013) and Tough Enough (2001–2002, 2011, 2015) ====
The Diva Search was an annual competition that occurred every summer. The purpose of the Diva Search was to find new women to be wrestlers, interviewers, and/or valets for WWE.

Tough Enough is a professional wrestling reality television series produced by WWE, wherein participants undergo professional wrestling training and compete for a contract with WWE. Female winners include Nidia, Jackie Gayda, Linda Miles, and Sara Lee. The series also featured women who would go on to appear across WWE television, including Mandy Rose, Sonya Deville, Kharma, and Chelsea Green among others.

==== Total Divas and spin-offs (2013–2022) ====
On April 22, 2013, it was announced several Divas would be featured on a new E! Network reality series titled Total Divas, following their lives outside of the ring. Natalya, Naomi, Cameron, The Bella Twins (Brie and Nikki), and also Eva Marie and JoJo Offerman from the developmental territory WWE NXT were announced as the inaugural cast for the show. The show premiered on July 28, proving to be an instant hit, and was renewed for a second season. Additionally, the E! Network announced on April 18, 2016, that The Bella Twins (Brie and Nikki) would be getting their own spinoff show titled Total Bellas following the lives of the twins.

On June 13, 2021, Essentially Sports reported that Total Divas and Total Bellas had been cancelled by the E! Network, citing a decline in ratings and lack of interest from those involved.

On January 8, 2018, it was announced that Maryse and her husband The Miz would be getting their own reality television series titled Miz & Mrs. The show premiered on July 24, 2018, on the USA Network.

On February 26, 2022, it was announced that Carmella and Corey Graves will be part of a spin-off series Corey & Carmella which will premiere on WWE's YouTube channel.

==== Other shows ====
Animated versions of the Fabulous Moolah and Wendi Richter were included on a CBS Saturday morning cartoon Hulk Hogan's Rock 'n' Wrestling.

In 1996, Sunny was named as AOL's most downloaded celebrity, thus expanding her popularity outside professional wrestling. She was heavily featured on mainstream TV shows such as MTV's Singled Out and Entertainment Tonight.

WWE Sunday Dhamaal, an Indian show produced by WWE, aired a special WWE Evolution episode hosted by Shenaz Treasury focusing on Women in WWE in 2018.

In 2019, WWE announced a reality series for Quibi, Fight Like a Girl, in which Stephanie McMahon paired WWE superstars with a young girl in each episode. The series was later moved to The Roku Channel following the closure of Quibi.

Episodes focusing on heel careers of Sasha Banks and Stephanie McMahon were part of the 2022 Peacock original series, WWE EVIL.

The ninth episode of A&E documentary series, WWE Rivals, "Stephanie McMahon vs. Brie Bella", focused on McMahon and Bella's on-screen rivalry.

In November 2022, WWE co-CEO Nick Khan announced during an investors call that Bianca Belair and her husband Montez Ford would be the subject of a new reality series that will debut on Hulu in 2023. WWE announced on November 2, 2023, that the first eight episodes of the series, now titled "Love & WWE: Bianca & Montez", would be released on Hulu on February 2, 2024.

=== WWE Network shows ===
A behind-the-scenes look at various WWE female superstars and Events was featured in WWE Network's documentary series WWE 24. The episodes entitled "Women's Evolution" and "Empowered" focused on the history of women in WWE, while episodes "Becky Lynch: The Man", "The Years of Ronda Rousey", and "Trish Stratus" focused on individual careers of Lynch, Rousey and Stratus respectively. Another documentary series, WWE 365, aired a special on Alexa Bliss on June 23, 2019. Paige, Charlotte Flair and Sasha Banks specials were part of another WWE Network's documentary series WWE Chronicle.

Several episodes of Table for 3 like "Diva Legends", "Millennium Divas", "Divas Champions Club", "Future Empowered", "Women's Championship Evolution", "Restaurant Riott" and "Ladies' Luncheon" featured current and former WWE female superstars discussing various aspects of their personal and professional life.

Animated version of various female WWE superstars like Sasha Banks, Becky Lynch, Bella Twins, Charlotte Flair, Paige and Stephanie McMahon were included in Camp WWE.

=== Other media ===
Fabulous Moolah and Wendi Richter appeared in two of Cyndi Lauper's music videos, "The Goonies 'R' Good Enough" and "She Bop".

From 1999 to 2000, Sable appeared as a guest star on an episode of Pacific Blue in 1999, and the following year, Chyna appeared as a guest star on Mad TV and 3rd Rock from the Sun as Janice, a police officer, as well as several Stacker 2 commercials and was a presenter at the MTV Video Music Awards. In November 2001, Trish Stratus, Lita, and Stephanie McMahon appeared as contestants on The Weakest Link's "WWF Superstars Edition". Lita, Molly Holly, and Jacqueline appeared as contestants on Fear Factor in February 2002. On February 2, 2002, Lita was a presenter at the MTV Asia Awards 2002, and appeared in a small role on Dark Angel on April 6 of that same year. In March 2004, she appeared on an episode of Headbangers Ball.

In 2007, Ashley Massaro, Torrie Wilson, Maryse, Brooke, Layla, and Kelly Kelly appeared a music video for music producer and rapper Timbaland for the track "Throw It on Me". In the same year, Torrie Wilson, Candice Michelle, Michelle McCool, Maria, Layla, and Kristal appeared in an episode of the American reality show Project Runway, in which designers were asked to design in-ring attire for their designated Diva. In 2008, Layla, Mickie James, Kelly Kelly, and Melina appeared in the American reality show Celebrity Fit Club: Boot Camp to get the celebrities in shape.

Fighting with My Family, a 2019 film co-produced by WWE Studios depicts the WWE career of Paige portrayed by Florence Pugh, also featuring wrestler Zelina Vega as AJ Lee.

The Fabulous Moolah was the subject of the sixth and season finale episode of the professional wrestling documentary series Dark Side of the Ring. It covered various events of Moolah's life like Rock 'n' Wrestling Connection, The Brawl to End It All, The Original Screwjob, the WrestleMania 34 name controversy, and various other WWE related incidents.

In 2019, the video game WWE 2K20 featured a 2K Showcase named "Four Horsewomen", which chronicled the careers of Bayley, Charlotte Flair, Sasha Banks, and Becky Lynch.

== Pro Wrestling Illustrated ==
=== PWI Female 50/Women's 100/Women's 150/Women's 250 ===
Year	1	2	3	4	5	6	7	8	9	10
PWI Female 50
2008	-	Beth Phoenix	Gail Kim	Mickie James	-	-	-	Melina	Michelle McCool	Candice Michelle
2009	Mickie James	-	Melina	-	-	-	Beth Phoenix	Michelle McCool	Maryse	-
2010	Michelle McCool	-	-	-	Eve Torres	-	Beth Phoenix	Mickie James	-	Maryse
2011	-	-	-	Natalya	-	-	Beth Phoenix	-	-	-
2012	-	Beth Phoenix	-	-	-	Layla	-	-	-	-
2013	-	-	-	-	Kaitlyn	-	-	-	AJ Lee	-
2014	Paige	AJ Lee	-	-	-	-	-	-	Natalya	Charlotte
2015	Nikki Bella	Paige	Sasha Banks	-	-	Charlotte	Naomi	-	-	-
2016	Charlotte Flair	Sasha Banks	Asuka	Becky Lynch	Bayley	-	Natalya	-	-	-
2017	Asuka	Charlotte Flair	Alexa Bliss	Sasha Banks	Bayley	-	Natalya	-	Naomi	-
PWI Women's 100
2018	Ronda Rousey	Alexa Bliss	Charlotte Flair	-	Asuka	-	Carmella	-	Nia Jax	-
2019	Becky Lynch	Charlotte Flair	Ronda Rousey	-	-	Bayley	Natalya	-	-	-
2020	Bayley	Becky Lynch	Asuka	Charlotte Flair	Sasha Banks	-	-	-	-	-
PWI Women's 150
2021	Bianca Belair	-	-	-	-	Sasha Banks	-	-	-	-
2022	-	Bianca Belair	-	Becky Lynch	-	-	-	Charlotte Flair	-	-
PWI Women's 250
2023	Rhea Ripley	-	Bianca Belair	-	-	-	-	-	-	-
2024	-	-	Rhea Ripley	-	-	-	Bayley	-	-	-
2025	-	-	-	Tiffany Stratton	Stephanie Vaquer	Iyo Sky	-	-	Naomi	Rhea Ripley
2026	Stephanie Vaquer	-	-	-	-	Liv Morgan	-	-	Rhea Ripley	-

=== PWI Year–End Awards ===
Year Won	Award	Wrestler
1996	Manager of the Year	Sunny
1999	Manager of the Year	Debra
1999	Woman of the Year	Debra
2000	Woman of the Year	Stephanie McMahon
2001	Woman of the Year	Lita
2002	Woman of the Year	Trish Stratus
2003	Woman of the Year	Trish Stratus
2004	Woman of the Year	Victoria
2005	Woman of the Year	Trish Stratus
2006	Woman of the Year	Trish Stratus
2007	Most Improved Wrestler of the Year	Candice Michelle
2007	Woman of the Year	Candice Michelle
2009	Woman of the Year	Mickie James
2010	Woman of the Year	Michelle McCool
2012	Woman of the Year	AJ Lee
2013	Woman of the Year	AJ Lee
2014	Rookie of the Year	Charlotte
2014	Woman of the Year	AJ Lee
2015	Inspirational Wrestler of the Year	Bayley
2015	Match of the Year	Bayley vs. Sasha Banks; October 8 at NXT TakeOver: Respect
2015	Woman of the Year	Sasha Banks
2016	Feud of the Year	Charlotte Flair vs. Sasha Banks
2016	Rookie of the Year	Nia Jax
2016	Woman of the Year	Charlotte Flair
2017	Woman of the Year	Asuka
2018	Rookie of the Year	Ronda Rousey
2018	Woman of the Year	Becky Lynch
2019	Most Popular Wrestler of the Year	Becky Lynch
2019	Woman of the Year	Becky Lynch
2020	Feud of the Year	Bayley vs. Sasha Banks
2020	Tag Team of the Year	Golden Role Models (Bayley and Sasha Banks)
2022	Most Improved Wrestler of the Year	Mandy Rose
2022	Woman of the Year	Bianca Belair
2023	Comeback of the Year	Trinity
2023	Rookie of the Year	Sol Ruca
2023	Faction of the Year	Rhea Ripley (The Judgment Day)
2023	Match of the Year	Rhea Ripley vs Charlotte Flair; April 1 at WrestleMania 39
2023	Woman of the Year	Rhea Ripley

== Sports Illustrated ==
=== Women's Wrestler of the Year ===
Year	1	2	3	4	5	6	7	8	9	10
2018	Becky Lynch	Charlotte Flair	-	Ronda Rousey	Asuka	Alexa Bliss	Toni Storm	Kairi Sane and Shayna Baszler	Bianca Belair	-
2019	Becky Lynch	-	Charlotte Flair	Shayna Baszler	-	-	Rhea Ripley	Bayley and Sasha Banks	-	-

=== Wrestler of the Year ===
Year	1	2	3	4	5	6	7	8	9	10
2017	-	-	-	-	-	-	-	-	-	-
2020	Sasha Banks	-	-	-	-	Bayley	Io Shirai	-	-	-
2021	-	-	Bianca Belair	-	-	-	-	-	-	-
2022	-	-	Bianca Belair	-	-	-	-	-	-	-
2023	-	Rhea Ripley	-	-	-	-	-	-	-	Becky Lynch

== Hall of Famers ==
The following list shows the female WWE Hall of Famers (excluding Warrior Award recipients) and the years that they were inducted into the WWE Hall of Fame.

Number	Year inducted	Inductee
1	1995	The Fabulous Moolah
2	2006	Sherri Martel
3	2008	Mae Young
4	2010	Wendi Richter
5	2011	Sunny
6	2013	Trish Stratus
7	2014	Lita
8	2015	Alundra Blayze
9	2016	Jacqueline
10	2017	Beth Phoenix
11	2018	Ivory
12	2019	Chyna as a member of D-Generation X
13	2019	Torrie Wilson
14	2020	The Bella Twins
15	2021	Molly Holly
16	2022	Sharmell
17	2023	Stacy Keibler
18	2024	Bull Nakano
19	2024	Lia Maivia
20	2025	Michelle McCool
21	2026	Stephanie McMahon
Legacy Wing
1	2016	Mildred Burke
2	2017	June Byers
3	2017	Judy Grable
4	2018	Cora Combs
5	2019	Luna Vachon
6	2021	Ethel Johnson

== Current WWE Women's division ==
For Information on WWE's current Women's division see List of WWE personnel on section's Main Roster; Raw Women's division & SmackDown Women's division, Nonexclusive for the inactive current WWE Women's division and the Development roster section for the NXT (their rookie) Women's division.

== Bibliography ==
- Olson, Cristopher; Reinhard, Carrie Lynn D. (2021). "Wrestling with Eating Disorders: Transmedia Depictions of Body Issues in WWE's Women's Professional Wrestling". In Johnson, Malynnda; Olson, Cristopher (eds.). Normalizing Mental Illness and Neurodiversity in Entertainment Media (1st E-book ed.). London: Routledge. doi:10.4324/9781003011668-15. ISBN 9781003011668. S2CID 233598773.
