= Aba Blues =

2026 Nigerian drama film

- Promotional poster
- Directed by: Jack'enneth Opukeme
- Written by: Jack'enneth Opukeme
- Produced by: Barbara Babarinsa
- Starring: Angel Anosike; Jide Kene Achufusi; Nelson Enwerem
- Production company: Inkblot Studios
- Distributed by: FilmOne Distributions
- Release date: 2026
- Country: Nigeria
- Language: English

Aba Blues is a 2026 Nigerian drama film, produced by Barbara Babarinsa, written and directed by Jack'enneth Opukeme. The film stars Angel Anosike, Jide Kene Achufusi, and Nelson Enwerem. It is distributed by FilmOne Distributions.

== Background ==
Aba Blues is set in Aba, Abia State, Nigeria. The director, in an interview, pointed out that "Aba has a rhythm you cannot ignore. That rhythm shaped the tone, the pacing, and the emotional core of the story". It was a joint work of Inkblot studios and FilmOne Distributions, with the latter as the distributor. The promotional poster was first released on 27 February 2026, and the film had its theatrical release on 20 March 2026.

== Cast ==
- Angel Anosike
- Jide Kene Achufusi
- Nelson Enwerem
- Odunlade Adekola
- Toni Tones

== Reception ==
The film recorded N19.9 million naira at the box office during its opening weekend.
