= NWA Southern Women's Championship (Georgia version) =

Professional wrestling women's championship

Details
- Promotion: Georgia Championship Wrestling
- Date established: September 16, 1958 (NLT)
- Date retired: After January 1970
Statistics
- First champion: Judy Grable
- Final champion: Toni Rose
- Most reigns: Judy Grable (2 reigns)

The NWA Southern Women's Championship was a women's professional wrestling championship created in 1937. After 1944 it was defended in the National Wrestling Alliance affiliated Georgia Championship Wrestling (then known as ABC Booking) until the championship was retired in 1970.

== Title history ==
Key
No.	Overall reign number
Reign	Reign number for the specific champion
Days	Number of days held

No.	Champion	Championship change			Reign statistics		Notes	Ref.
No.	Champion	Date	Event	Location	Reign	Days	Notes	Ref.
1	Judy Grable	September 16, 1958 (NLT)	N/A (Note: The event of the championship change is either uncertain or has not been found documented.)	N/A (Note: The location of the championship change is either uncertain or has not been found documented.)	1	N/A (Note: The length of the championship reign is too uncertain to calculate.)	Still a champion as of March 21, 1959.	
Championship history is unrecorded from March 21, 1959 to before April 8, 1960.
2	Gloria Barratini	April 8, 1960 (NLT)	N/A	N/A	1	N/A	Either defeated Mae Young to win the title or defeated her as a champion on that date.	
Championship history is unrecorded from before April 8, 1960 to before November 25, 1960.
3	Penny Banner	November 25, 1960 (NLT)	N/A	N/A	1	N/A		
4	Barbara Baker	November 30, 1960	N/A	Atlanta, GA	1	N/A		
Championship history is unrecorded from November 30, 1960 to before February 1961.
5	Judy Grable	February 1961 (NLT)	N/A	N/A	2	N/A	Either remained the champion or won the title on August 3, 1982.	
Championship history is unrecorded from August 3, 1982 to before September 6, 1963.
6	Cora Combs	September 6, 1963 (NLT)	N/A	N/A	1	N/A		
Championship history is unrecorded from September 6, 1963 to before January 1970.
7	Toni Rose	January 1970 (NLT)	N/A	N/A	1	N/A		
—	Deactivated	N/A	—	—	—	—	Toni Rose was the last known documented champion. The date where the title was deactivated is unknown.	

== See also ==
- Jim Crockett Promotions
- National Wrestling Alliance
- Georgia Championship Wrestling
