= All's Fair in Love (2024 film) =

2024 Nigerian romantic film

- Directed by: Kayode Kasum
- Written by: Jack'enneth Opukeme
- Produced by: Deyemi Okanlawon, Esse Akwawa, Glory Obichukwu
- Starring: Timini Egbuson; Juliet Ibrahim; Ireti Doyle; Deyemi Okanlawon
- Distributed by: Prime Video
- Release date: 2024
- Running time: 114 minutes
- Country: Nigeria
- Language: English

All's Fair in Love is a 2024 Nigerian romance drama film directed by Kayode Kasum, and produced by Deyemi Okanlawon. Produced by Inkblot Productions and distributed by Prime Video, the film features Deyemi, Buhle Samuels, Timini Egbuson, Juliet Ibrahim, and Ireti Doyle. It centers on two main characters, Demi and Kanla, who are two fashion entrepreneurs and felt love for Mbali. All's Fair in Love explores the themes of live, its complexities, and human nature.

== Plot summary ==
Demi and Kayla are friends as well as deal on same business, fashion and design. Both develops feeling for Mbali, who becomes the company's consultant, institutes her own rules and vision.

== Reception ==
What Kept Me Up criticised the film's plot, with the reviewer Ayodele Olawumi writing, "the plot suffers from a lack of depth as it doesn’t delve deep enough into the details of the plot to make them solid".

Confidence Cletus of Premium Times wrote, "the movie has a good storyline but lacks depth and suspense. The end of the film was predictable. Although the movie has great potential, it did not hit as expected".
