= Jack'enneth Opukeme =

Film editor and director

Jack'enneth Opukeme is a Nigerian film writer, actor, and director. He is known for Adire, Farmer’s Bride and Aba Blues.

== Early life and career ==
Opukeme wrote Adire (2023). In 2026, her film, Aba Blues, premiered on 15 March 2026 in Lagos, Nigeria.

== Filmography ==
Films directed:

- Battle on Buka Street (2022)
- Farmer's Bride (2024)
- Aba Blues (2026)
