= Judy Grable =

American professional wrestler

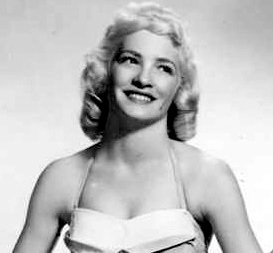

Personal information
- Born: Nellya Baughman; August 21, 1935 Bremerton, Washington, U.S.
- Died: May 9, 2008 (aged 72)

Professional wrestling career
- Ring name(s): Judy Grable; Peaches Grable
- Billed height: 5 ft 6 in (1.68 m)
- Billed weight: 137 lb (62 kg)
- Trained by: The Fabulous Moolah
- Debut: 1953
- Retired: 1966

Nellya Baughman (August 21, 1935 – May 9, 2008) was an American professional wrestler who was best known by her ring name Judy Grable. She was an active wrestler during the 1950s and 1960s. In addition to her nickname "The Barefoot Contessa" due to her preference for wrestling barefoot, she was also known as "the acrobatic blonde with the educated flying feet".

== Professional wrestling career ==
Grable trained for her professional wrestling career with The Fabulous Moolah in her school in Columbia, South Carolina. She debuted in 1953 using the name Peaches Grable. Moolah's female trainees worked in Boston under promoter Paul Bowser, and in Boston, Grable and Moolah were involved in a feud.

She wrestled in the National Wrestling Alliance (NWA) territories through the 1950s and the 1960s. In September 1956, a battle royal was held to determine the new NWA World Women's Champion, but Grable lost to long-time rival The Fabulous Moolah. On September 20, 1959, Grable made an appearance as a contestant on the popular television show What's My Line? The episode became famous in part because of the highly risque banter from guest panelist Groucho Marx and consequent malapropisms by regular panelist Dorothy Kilgallen and host John Daly.

Even though she retired in the late 1960s, Grable's last in-ring work occurred in Superstar Wrestling in 1974.

On March 31, 2017, Grable was posthumously inducted into the WWE Hall of Fame as a part of the Legacy wing.

== Personal life ==
Grable was the youngest of six children, including four brothers and one sister. She was a tomboy who liked fishing, hunting, and sports. She also wrestled at Grand Junction High School. Her family later moved to Florida, where Grable became interested in the circus. She was employed at Ringling Brothers Circus as an acrobat for six months, deciding she would rather wrestle after falling off a high wire.

In the late 1960s, Grable retired from wrestling after marrying a serviceman and returned to school, graduating in 1978. She was then employed as a nurse's assistant in a home for veterans. One of her daughters works as a wrestler under the name Debbie Grable.

Grable died on May 9, 2008, after living with diabetes, strokes, and Alzheimer's.

== Championships and accomplishments ==
- Cauliflower Alley Club

- Other honoree (2002)

- Georgia Championship Wrestling

- NWA Southern Women's Championship (Georgia version) (2 times)

- Professional Wrestling Hall of Fame and Museum
  - Women's wrestler (2011)
- WWE

- WWE Hall of Fame (Class of 2017)
