= Professional wrestling throws =

Professional wrestling throws are the application of professional wrestling techniques that involve lifting the opponent up and throwing or slamming them down. They are sometimes also called "power" maneuvers, as they are meant to emphasize a wrestler's strength. Many of these moves are used as finishers by various wrestlers, who refer to them by several different names that reflect their gimmick. Moves are listed under general categories whenever possible.

== Armbreaker ==
An armbreaker is any move in which the wrestler slams the opponent's arm against a part of the wrestler's body, usually a knee or shoulder.

=== Diving armbreaker ===
A wrestler dives from the ropes and lands on the opponent's arm.

=== Double knee armbreaker ===
The wrestler grabs one of the opponent's arms, jumps and connects both their knees against the opponent's stretched arm. As the wrestler falls onto their back, this forces the opponent's arm down into both knees, thus damaging it. A variant where the performing wrestler puts his opponent in a hammerlock before performing a double knee maneuver similar to a double knee backbreaker also exists, simply known as a hammerlock double knee armbreaker.

=== Snap armbreaker ===
The attacking wrestler grabs the opponent's arm as in a cross armbar attempt, and proceeds to pull the arm in a snap motion towards their own body. Penta uses a variant in which he performs a grounded hammerlock on the opposite arm before performing the snap armbreaker, calling it The Sacrifice.

== Arm drag ==
A move in which the wrestler uses their opponent's momentum to the opponent's disadvantage. The wrestler hooks the opponent's arm and flips them over on to the mat. The wrestler may roll on to their side to give the move extra momentum.

=== Japanese arm drag ===
This move is performed when an opponent runs towards the wrestler facing them. When the opponent is in range, the wrestler hooks the opponent's near arm with both hands and falls backwards, forcing the wrestler's own momentum to cause them to flip forwards over the head of the wrestler and on to their back. Despite its name, it actually originates from Mexican lucha libre, not Japanese puroresu.

=== Over-the-shoulder arm drag ===
The wrestler grabs their opponent's arm, then turns to face the other direction and pulls the opponent over their shoulder. It is essentially the same as the ippon seoi nage found in judo.

=== Tilt-a-whirl arm drag ===
An arm drag which sees the wrestler being spun in front of the opponent's body in a tilt-a-whirl, and then ending it with an arm drag.

=== Wheelbarrow arm drag ===
This arm drag sees the wrestler being held in a wheelbarrow hold by the opponent, and then going for an over the shoulder arm drag as they free their legs off of the opponent's waist. It was used by AJ Lee as a transition move.

== Arm wringer ==
An arm wringer or spinning wristlock is a move in which the wrestler grabs the opponent's wrist with both hands and twists it over the wrestler's head to spin the arm around, either with enough force to flip the opponent to the mat or just to hyperrotate the joints while standing. When used as a hold, the wrestler often yanks the arm for added effect. A snap drop variant in which the performing wrestler drives the opponent in a front drop after performing the arm wringer has been popularized by MJF.

== Atomic drop ==
A move in which the wrestler goes behind an opponent, then puts their head under the opponent's shoulder. They then lift their opponent up, and drops them tailbone-first on the wrestler's knee. Known in Mexico's lucha libre as silla eléctrica (Spanish for electric chair).

=== Inverted atomic drop ===
Also known as a "Manhattan drop", this is a move in which the wrestler puts their head under the opponent's shoulder and lifts the opponent up and then drops their groin on the wrestler's knee.

=== Sitout full nelson atomic drop ===
Better known as a full nelson bomb, this move sees the wrestling apply a full nelson hold to the opponent from behind. The wrestler then lifts the opponent into the air and falls into a seated position, driving the opponent tailbone-first on to the mat. This move is used by Bubba Ray Dudley, who dubbed it the Bubba Bomb/Bully Bomb.

== Backbreaker ==
A backbreaker refers to professional wrestling moves in which a wrestler drops an opponent so that the opponent's back impacts or is bent backwards against a part of the wrestler's body, usually the knee.

== Back body drop ==
A back body drop or backdrop (also sometimes called a shoulder back toss), is a move in which a wrestler bends forward or crouches in front of their opponent, grabs hold of the opponent, and stands up, lifting the opponent up and over and dropping them behind the back. It is applied frequently against a charging opponent. In Japan, a backdrop is the term for what is called a belly-to-back suplex in America, so in Japan, it is called shoulder throw.

=== Mountain bomb ===
Innovated by Hiroyoshi Tenzan. This move sees the opponent runs towards the wrestler. The wrestler ducks, hooks one of the opponent's legs with one of their arms, stands up and falls backwards, flipping the opponent and driving them back first down to the mat, with the wrestler landing on top of the opponent.

== Biel throw ==
The wrestler stands slightly to the side of their opponent, grabs the opponent by the nape in a single or double collar tie, and throws them forward, causing the opponent to flip over onto their back. It is considered a very basic technique, so basic that a forward rolling fall is commonly called a biel bump and is mainly used by very large wrestlers to emphasize power and strength over finesse.

== Brainbuster ==
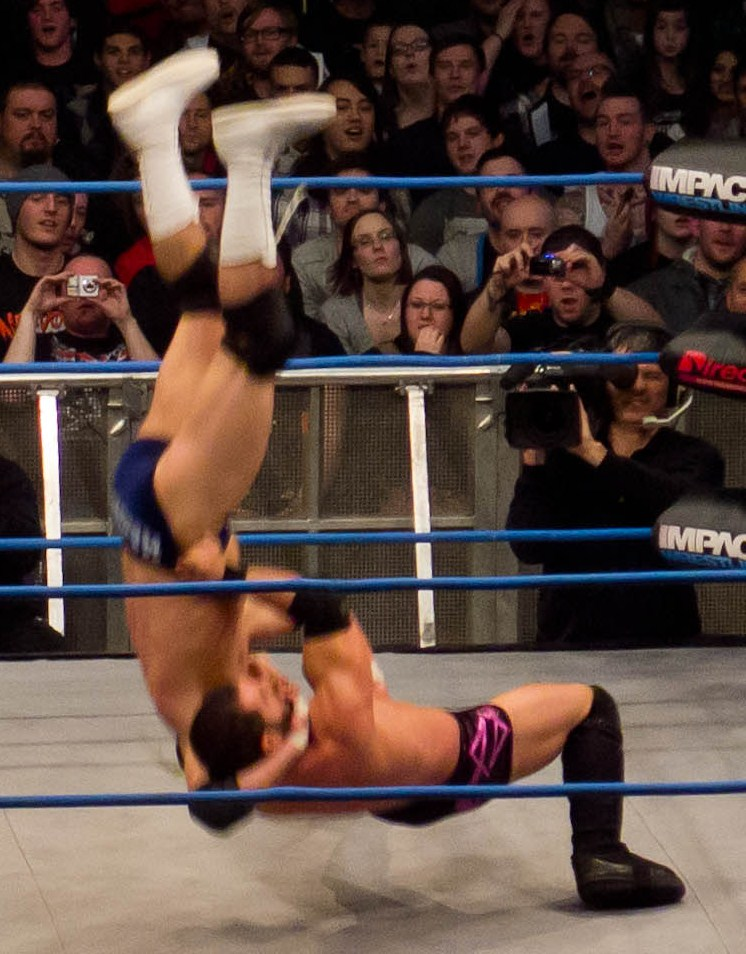
Austin Aries performing a brainbuster to Mark Haskins.

A brainbuster is a move in which a wrestler puts their opponent in a front facelock, hooks their tights, and lifts them up as if they were performing a vertical suplex. The wrestler then either jumps up or quickly falls onto their back so that the opponent lands on their head while remaining vertical.

== Bulldog ==
A bulldog, originally known as bulldogging or a bulldogging headlock or the headlock jawbreaker, is any move in which the wrestler grabs an opponent's head and jumps forward, so that the wrestler lands, often in a sitting position, and drives the opponent's face into the mat. This move plus some other variations are sometimes referred to as facebusters.

=== Cobra Clutch bulldog ===
The wrestler applies a Cobra Clutch and then leaps forward, falling into a sitting position and driving the face of the opponent into the ground.

=== Diving bulldog ===
The wrestler jumps from the turnbuckle behind the opponent, then applies a headlock, driving the opponent's face into the mat. Popularized by Rick Steiner. It is also used by Trevor Murdoch as a finisher.

==== Diving leg drop bulldog ====
Also known as a Diving Famouser. The wrestler springboards off one of the ropes or jumps from the top turnbuckle, dropping a leg across the nape of a leaning forward opponent. This was popularized by both Billy Gunn and John Cena as one of their signature moves. Carmelo Hayes currently uses this move under the name Nothing But Net.

=== Fireman's carry bulldog ===
The attacking wrestler picks up the opponent in a fireman's carry. The wrestler then proceeds by holding their opponent's legs with one arm and applying a headlock with their other arm in a similar fashion to an Air Raid Crash. From here, the attacking wrestler twists the opposite way and quickly switches back, throwing the opponent's legs out backwards and drops down to the mat while holding the opponent's head, forcing them to fall face first into a bulldog position. This variation was used and popularized by TNA wrestler James Storm, who dubbed it the Eight Second Ride.

=== Full nelson bulldog ===
This variation begins with the wrestler holding the opponent in a full nelson. The wrestler then leaps forward into a sitting position, driving the opponent face-first. The move was popularized by Jillian Hall.

=== Half nelson bulldog ===
The wrestler hooks a half nelson hold on their opponent with one arm and their opponent's waist with the other, then leaps forward into a sitting position, driving the face of the opponent into the ground. This move is a signature of Edge, who calls it Winning Edge.

=== Inverted bulldog ===
The attacking wrestler stands side-to-side and slightly behind the opponent, facing in the opposite direction, then leaps in the air and drops to a seated position, driving the opponent neck- and back-first to the mat. In another variation, the attacker runs to the opponent and executes the move. This is usually referred to as a lariat takedown.

=== Knee drop bulldog ===
A version that involves the wrestler placing one knee against the base of a bent over opponent's neck, then dropping to force the opponent down to the mat, landing on the opponent's upper body. There is also a diving version.

=== Leg drop bulldog ===
The wrestler jumps in the air and uses one leg to push down on the head of an opponent who is leaning forward, which drives the opponent face-first into the mat. The move was innovated by Johnny Ace, calling it the Ace Crusher II, popularized by Billy Gunn, who called it the Famouser (or the fame-ass-er when he was wrestling as ‘Mr.Ass.) Nic Nemeth/Dolph Ziggler used the move as well. Marty Jannetty performed a version of the move where he applied a wristlock to the opponent first, which became known as the Rocker Dropper. Kelly Kelly later adopted the same variation as her finishing maneuver, calling it K2.

==== Inverted leg drop bulldog ====
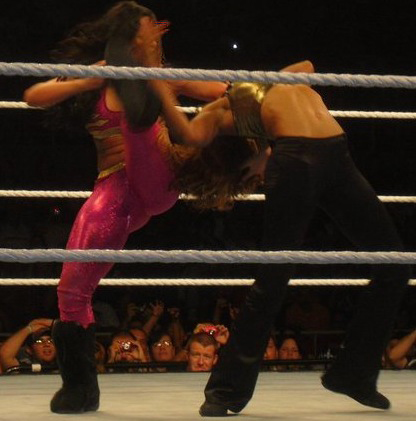
Melina performing an inverted leg drop bulldog on Alicia Fox

An inverted version of this sees the attacking wrestler drop the opponent on the back of their head, as done in a reverse bulldog. This can be achieved by first holding an opponent in an inverted facelock or by simply grabbing the opponent and forcibly leaning them back before lifting their far (or sometimes inside) leg, rotating so the leg is over the opponent's head, and dropping to a sitting position, kneeling, or a split-legged position and maintained into a pin. WWE wrestler Melina popularized this move.

=== One-handed bulldog ===
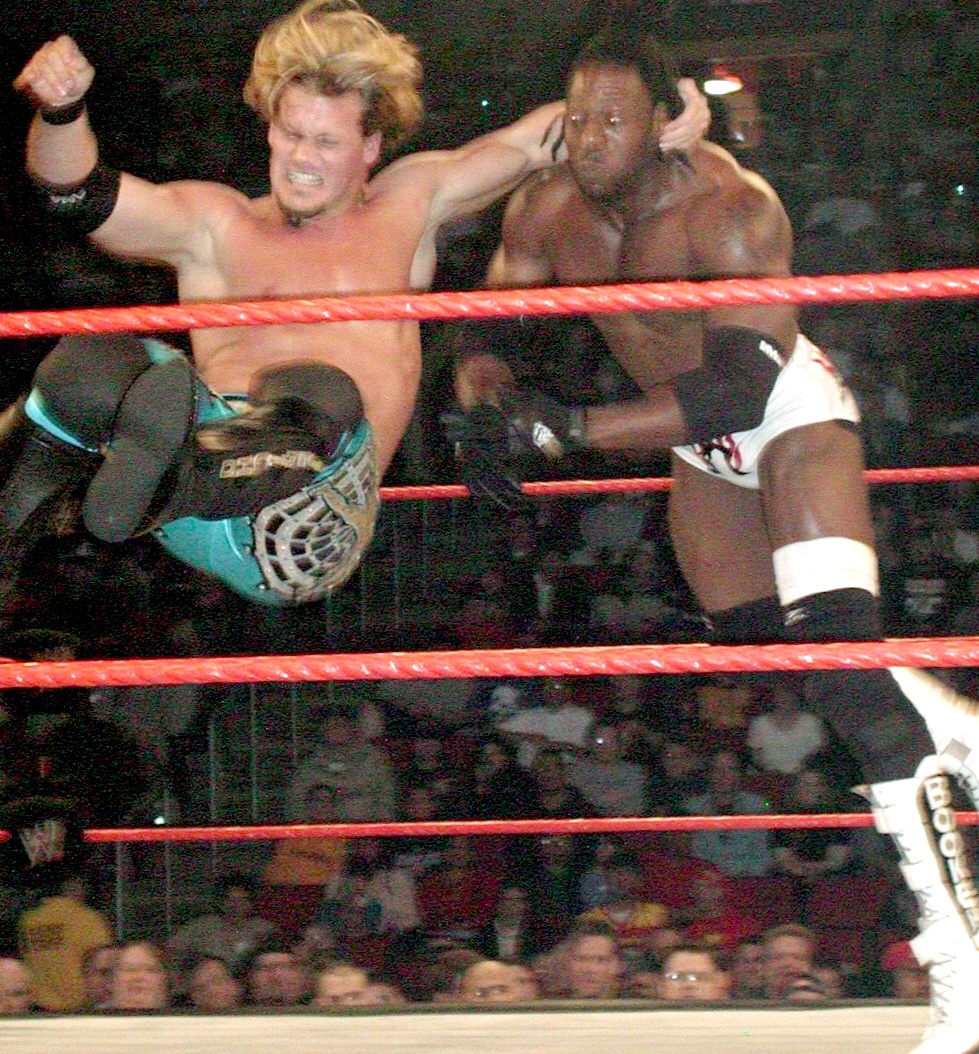
Chris Jericho performing a one-handed bulldog on Booker T.

The one-handed bulldog is in fact more of a facebuster than an actual bulldog and generally sees a wrestler run up from behind their opponent, grab the opponent's head with one hand, and leap forward. Kenny Omega has used a variation, called the Kotaro Krusher, where he performed a jump from the canvas over the opponent, usually jumping upwards of 6 feet before hitting the bulldog.

=== Reverse bulldog ===
Standing next to or diagonally behind an opponent, the attacking wrestler leaps up, grabs the opponent's head and pulls backwards, resulting in both individuals landing supine. Current TNA wrestler Nic Nemeth uses and popularized this move, which he calls the Danger Zone. It was previously known as the Zig Zag during his tenure in WWE as Dolph Ziggler.

=== Slingshot bulldog ===
Similar to a hangman, where the wrestler catches the opponent in a side headlock, running towards any set of ropes. The wrestler then jumps over them and bulldogs the opponent, driving the chin/face of the opponent into the top rope. The wrestler would eventually either land standing or seated on the apron or the outside of the ring.

The same maneuver can be used on a cornered opponent (who is facing away from the ring) to drive their face into the top turnbuckle.

=== Spinning bulldog ===
The wrestler stands to the side of the opponent and applies a side headlock. The wrestler then spins around in a circle and drops into a seated position, driving the opponent face-first into the mat.

=== Springboard bulldog ===
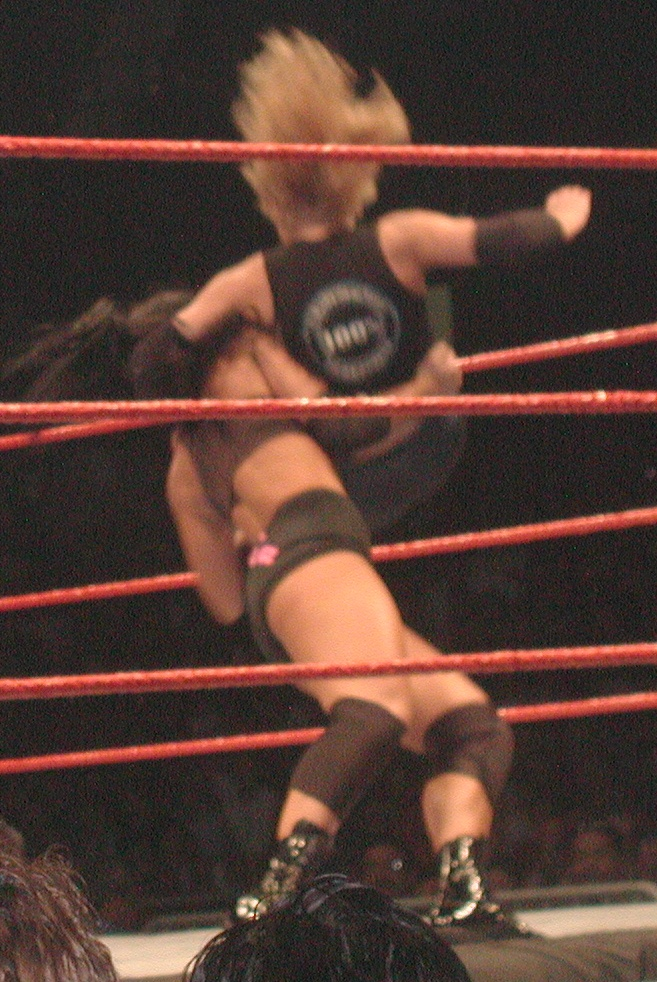
Trish Stratus hits the Stratusfaction (springboard bulldog) on Victoria

The wrestler applies a headlock on the opponent, then runs towards the ropes and bounces off, driving the opponent face-first into mat as they land. WWE Hall of Famer Trish Stratus popularized this move and dubbed it the Stratusfaction and it was also used by Bo Dallas as the Bo-Dog.

=== Two-handed bulldog ===
The wrestler places both hands behind the opponent's head, then falls into a seated position, slamming the opponent's face into the canvas. Another variation sees the wrestler placing one hand behind the opponent's head and the other behind the back, then falling backwards into a bulldog. WWE Hall of Famer Mick Foley used this move as one of his signature moves. The move was also used by Scotty 2 Hotty as a signature move.

=== Wheelbarrow bulldog ===
This bulldog sees the opponent clutching the wrestler in a wheelbarrow bodyscissors. The wrestler then falls downwards, while still scissoring their legs around the opponent's waist, and pushes against the canvas. As they rebound back to the opponent, the attacker releases their legs, quickly places their hand behind the opponent's head, and goes for a bulldog. The bulldog is usually one-handed rather than a headlock bulldog.

== Catapult ==
A catapult or slingshot catapult is a throw that typically starts with the opponent on their back, and the wrestler standing and facing them. The wrestler hooks each of the opponent's legs in one of their arms, then falls backwards to slingshot the opponent into a turnbuckle, ladder, rope, mat, etc. This can also be held for a backbreaker.

== Chokeslam ==
A chokeslam is any body slam in which the wrestler grasps their opponent's neck, lifts them up, and slams them to the mat, causing them to land on their back. The move is used by numerous wrestlers, often larger ones who portray "monster" characters.

== Cobra Clutch slam ==
In this slam a wrestler places the opponent in a Cobra Clutch and then lifts the opponent into the air by their neck before jumping backwards to drive the opponent back-first down to the mat while remaining standing, falling forward, or dropping into a seated or kneeling position. The fall-forward version of the move were both used by Billy Gunn as the One & Only and later popularized by Ted DiBiase Jr., who used a modified version in which he dropped the opponent to one side, naming it the Dream Street. Jinder Mahal currently uses the kneeling side slam version of this move, calling it the Khallas.

== DDT ==
Animated DDT move

The DDT is a move innovated by Jake "The Snake" Roberts, performed by putting the opponent's head underneath the attacker's arm in a front facelock and then falling back, driving the opponent's head into the mat.

== Driver ==
A driver is a move in which the wrestler clutches the opponent's body in some form before falling into a sitout position while dropping the opponent on their back, neck, and/or shoulders.

=== Abdominal stretch driver ===
First the wrestler applies an Abdominal stretch. They then uses their free arm to creating momentum by raising it skywards and bringing down quickly in between the opponent's legs while using their own body weight to fall sideways, flipping the opponent over them to slam them on the back of their head and neck. NXT wrestler Gigi Dolin used this move as a finisher called the Gigi Driver.

=== Black Fire driver ===
Used as a finisher by Rey Fenix, this move starts with the wrestler having their opponent up on their shoulders as if they are going to perform a muscle buster, but then spin their opponent around into a Michinoku driver II-B.

=== Cobra Clutch driver ===
The wrestler stands behind an opponent and applies a cobra clutch on their opponent, placing one of their hands against the opponent's neck after hooking the opponent's arm with it. They then scoop the opponent's near leg with their other arm and lift the opponent up, flip the opponent upside down, and then either kneel or sit down, driving the opponent down to the mat on their neck. Another variation has the attacking wrestler apply a pumphandle prior to executing this technique and is used by wrestlers like Jinder Mahal.

=== Electric chair driver ===
Also known as a Joker Driver. In this variation of a driver, the wrestler lifts the opponent on their shoulders in an electric chair sitting position and then takes hold of the opponent and pulls them over their shoulder and down to the mat while falling to a sit out position so that the opponent lands on their upper back and neck between the legs of the wrestler, facing towards them, usually resulting in a pin. A one-handed variation is used by Kenny Omega, known as the One-Winged Angel and by Big Damo known as the Ulster Plantation. Chris Hero has also used this move as well, calling it the Rubik's Cube, as well as "Speedball" Mike Bailey, who uses a cross-legged version of the move called the Flamingo Driver.

=== Fisherman driver ===
This move was innovated by Shiro Koshinaka and it was called a Samurai Driver '94 as a finisher. The wrestler places the opponent in a front facelock and hooks one of the opponent's legs with their free arm. The wrestler then lifts the opponent upside down or on to their shoulders, and then sits down, driving the opponent between their legs, head and shoulder first. A wrist-clutch variation of this driver exists which sees the wrestler lift the opponent on to their shoulders, and while the opponent is on their shoulders, they use the hand hooking the opponent's leg to reach upwards and clutch the wrist of the arm opposite the hooked leg. While maintaining the wrist-clutch, they then perform the driver. There is a further variation that does not include the shoulder lift that sees the wrestler hook the leg and wrist while the opponent is standing in front of them, lift the opponent upside down and then fall to the sitout position. This move was made popular by wrestler Low Ki who calls it the Ki Krusher. A cross legged version is used by CIMA, who calls it the Perfect Driver.

==== Wrist-clutch fisherman driver ====
This variation involves grabbing and pulling by the opponent's wrist, then lifting them up into the air, before falling to their back, driving the opponent to the ground on the back of their head/neck. This was popularized by Shingo Takagi as The Last Falconry, now known as The Last of the Dragon.

=== Half nelson driver ===
This was invented by Kensuke Sasaki. The wrestler stands behind an opponent and applies a half nelson hold on their opponent, placing one of their hands against the opponent's neck after hooking the opponent's arm with it. They then scoop the opponent's near leg with their other arm and lift the opponent up, flip the opponent upside down, and then either kneel or sit down, driving the opponent down to the mat on their neck. Another variation has the attacking wrestler apply a pumphandle prior to executing this technique. This variation has been used by Jordynne Grace (Juggernaut Driver; formerly Beast Mode and Plumphandle), Pénta (Pénta Driver), Yoshi-Hashi (Karma), Shingo Takagi (Made in Japan) and several other wrestlers.

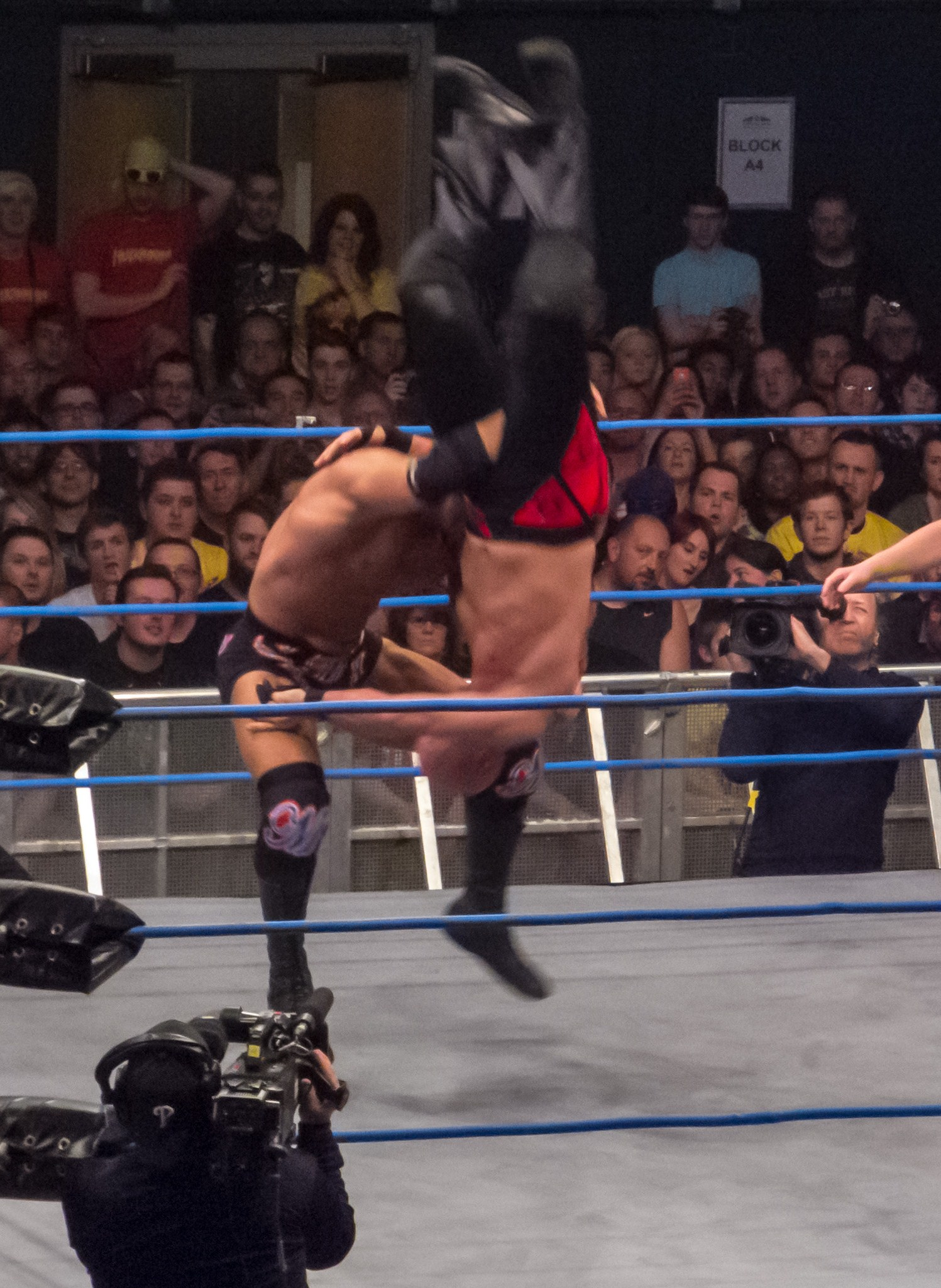
Nick Aldis performing the Michinoku driver II on Christopher Daniels

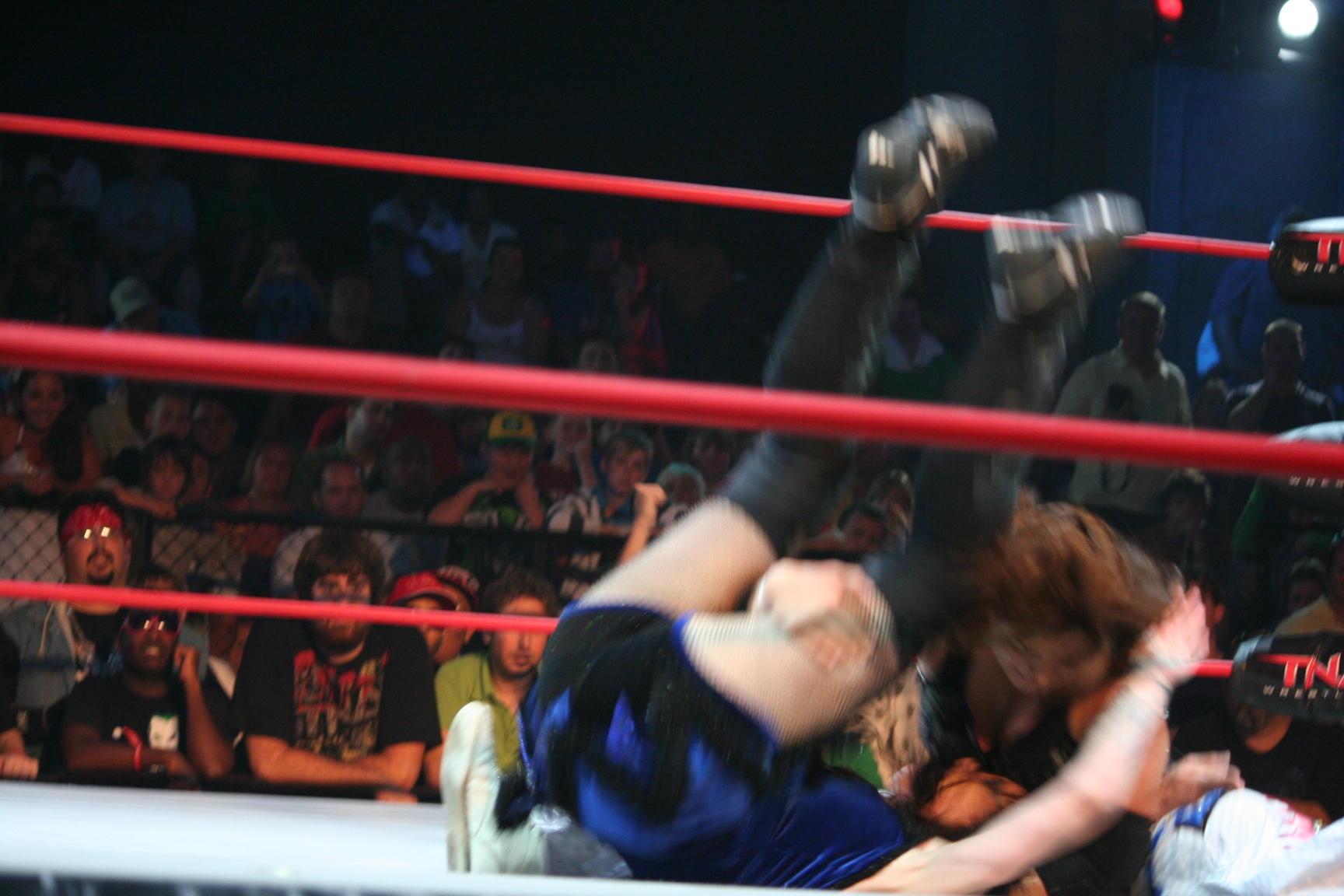
Ayako Hamada performing a Michinoku driver II on Daffney

=== Michinoku Driver II ===
Innovated by Taka Michinoku, and technically known as a sitout scoop slam piledriver. Facing their opponent, the wrestler reaches between their opponent's legs with their right arm and reaches around the opponent's neck from the same side with their left arm. They then lift the opponent up and turn them around so that they are held upside down, as in a scoop slam, before dropping down into a sitout position, driving the opponent down to the mat neck and shoulder first. Many people call it the Michinoku Driver because it is used more often than the original Michinoku Driver. This variation of the move was also used by Vampiro under the name Nail in the Coffin.

==== Michinoku Driver II-B ====
A variation of the Michinoku Driver II in which the wrestler stands behind the opponent, applies an inverted facelock, lifts them upside down, and then drops down to a sitting position, driving the opponent down to the mat between the wrestler's legs upper back first. AEW wrestler Ricochet uses a spinning version of the move called Vertigo.

=== Samoan driver ===
The attacking wrestler drapes an opponent over their shoulders in a fireman's carry position and then takes hold of the opponent and pulls them over their shoulder and down to the mat while falling to a sitting position so that the opponent lands on their upper back and neck between the legs of the wrestler, facing towards them. It is used as finishing moves by wrestlers such as TNA wrestlers Su Yung (Panic Switch), and Ash by Elegance (formerly known as Dana Brooke in WWE), and is also used by Chris Sabin (Cradle Shock, which consists of a cross-legged carry), Santos Escobar (Phantom Driver) and Lyra Valkyria (Nightwing). Former WWE Diva Ivory uses this as a signature move. Shinsuke Nakamura formerly used the move as a finisher as Landslide, only to later change his primary finisher to the Bomaye/Kinshasa, although he still occasionally uses the move as a signature. A variant of the move, which involves a wrist-clutch, is used by Shingo Takagi as the Last of the Dragon or Last Falconry.

=== Wheelbarrow driver ===
Similar to the wheelbarrow facebuster but instead of dropping their opponent face first, they drop their opponent so that the opponent lands on their upper back and neck between the legs of the wrestler, facing towards them, usually resulting in a pin. Swerve Strickland is well known for using this move as his finisher, using a half-nelson variation dubbed Big Pressure (formerly known as the JML Driver).

== Electric chair drop ==
The wrestler lifts the opponent on their shoulders in an electric chair sitting position and then falls backwards driving the opponent back-first into the mat. There is also a driver, a facebuster and a suplex variation of the move.

== Facebreaker ==
A facebreaker is any move in which the wrestler slams their opponent's face against a part of the wrestler's body, usually the knee.

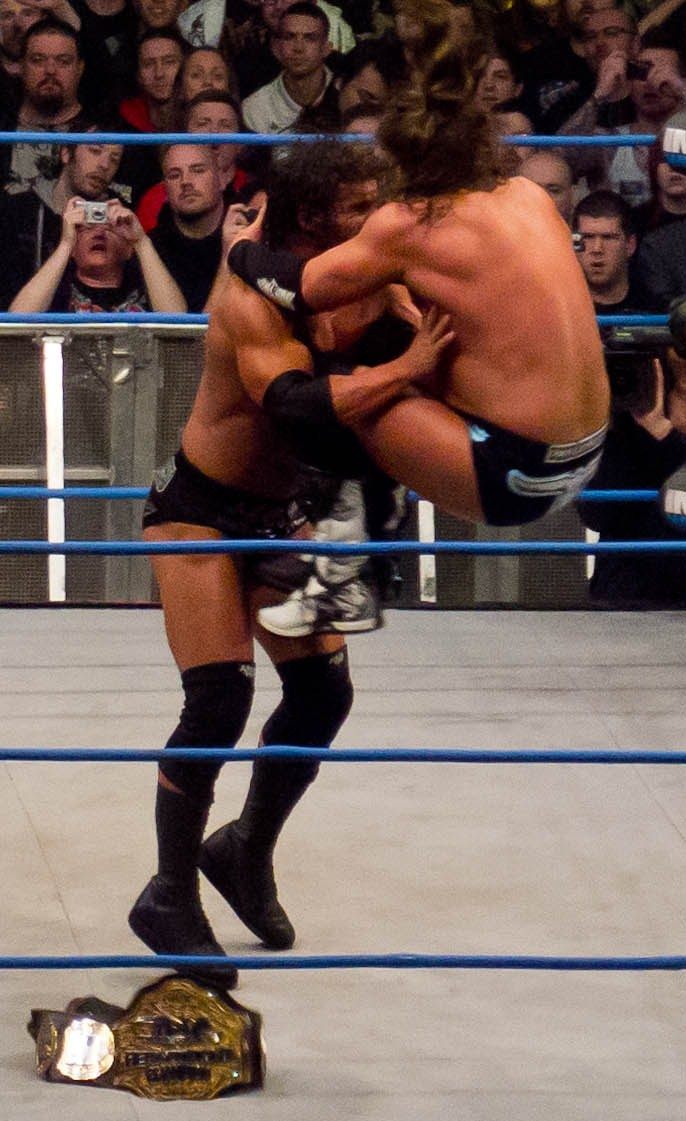
James Storm attempts a double knee facebreaker on Robert Roode

=== Double knee facebreaker ===
This facebreaker involves an attacking wrestler, who is standing face-to-face with an opponent, hooking both hands around the opponent's head and then leaping to bring both knees up to the face of the opponent. The wrestler then falls backwards to the mat, thus forcing the opponent to fall forwards and impact the exposed knees. The move was originated by Phillip Michael Grant, and later popularized by Chris Jericho, who named it the Codebreaker. It would also be used by Asuka, James Storm and Carmelo Hayes as signature moves, with Storm referring to the move as Bottoms Up! and Hayes referring to it as The First 48. Bushi uses a diving variation called MX where he dives from the top rope to hit the double knee facebreaker, as well as Tessa Blanchard, who calls the move Magnum, also as an homage to her stepfather Magnum T. A.. Liv Morgan's 201/Jersey Codebreaker is a variation where she stands 90 degrees from the opponent, and delivers the double knees or shins while she is landing on her back.

=== Fireman's carry facebreaker ===
This move is performed in a manner similar to the TKO, but instead of dropping their opponent face first on the mat, they would be dropped face first on the knee of the wrestler performing the move. Austin Theory is currently using this move as a finisher initially dubbed as the Austin Theory Lift (ATL) during his time in NXT, but now has been dubbed the A-Town Down ever since moving up to the main roster.

=== Inverted stomp facebreaker ===
Also known as the Foot Stunner. The user applies a standing wrist lock on their opponent, then places their foot on the opponent's face and falls backwards, forcing the opponent's face into their foot. This move is used as a finishing move by Gail Kim (Eat Defeat), Chuck Taylor (Sole Food), Xavier Woods (Lost in the Woods), Enzo Amore (JawdonZo), Colt Cabana (Eat The Feet) and Mia Yim (Seoul Food [formerly known as Eat Defeat]).

=== Knee smash facebreaker ===
The move is a standard facebreaker which involves the wrestler facing an opponent and grabbing their by the head or hair and pulling the opponent's face down, dropping it on to the wrestler's knee. Often used by a wrestler to stun an opponent and set them up for another move. Many other facebreakers use the knee to inflict the damage; one variation sees the wrestler apply a standing side headlock, and simultaneously pull the opponent forward and smash the wrestler's knee to the opponent's head. Triple H popularized this move.

=== Shoulder facebreaker ===
Also described as a hangman's facebreaker or an over the shoulder facebreaker, this facebreaker is performed when an attacking wrestler, who is standing in a back to back position with an opponent, reaches back to pull the opponent's head over their shoulder before (while keeping a hold of the opponent's head) spinning round to twist the opponent's head over as they drop down to one knee forcing the opponent face-first into the wrestlers exposed knee in one quick fluid motion.

=== Single knee facebreaker ===
Similar to the double knee facebreaker, but with only one knee. Shawn Spears used this move during his second tenure in the WWE as "Tye Dillinger", calling it Perfect 10. Ricochet uses this move, calling it Recoil and Gregory Helms also uses it.

== Facebuster ==
A facebuster, also known as a faceplant, is any move in which the wrestler forces their opponent's face down to the mat which does not involve a headlock or facelock.

== Fireman's carry throws ==
A fireman's carry involves the wrestler holding the opponent in place over both shoulders. From this position, various throws can be performed.

=== Airplane spin ===
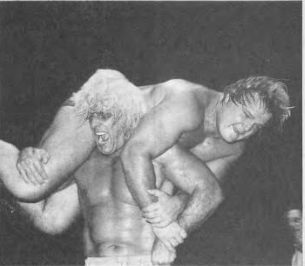
Ric Flair performing an airplane spin on Greg Valentine

A wrestler lifts the opponent on to their shoulders and spins around and around until they get dizzy and crash to the ground. This move has been made famous notably by WWE Hall of Famer Gorilla Monsoon and NXT's Tyler Bate. This move was the finisher of Mike Rotunda during his time in the WWF in the mid-80s.

==== Inverted airplane spin ====
This move is performed from an Argentine Backbreaker Rack Hold. Occasionally, the person doing the move can do it without their hands on their opponent, typically on the hips. Used by Claudio Castagnoli as the "UFO" ("Unidentified Flying Opponent"),.

=== Death Valley driver ===
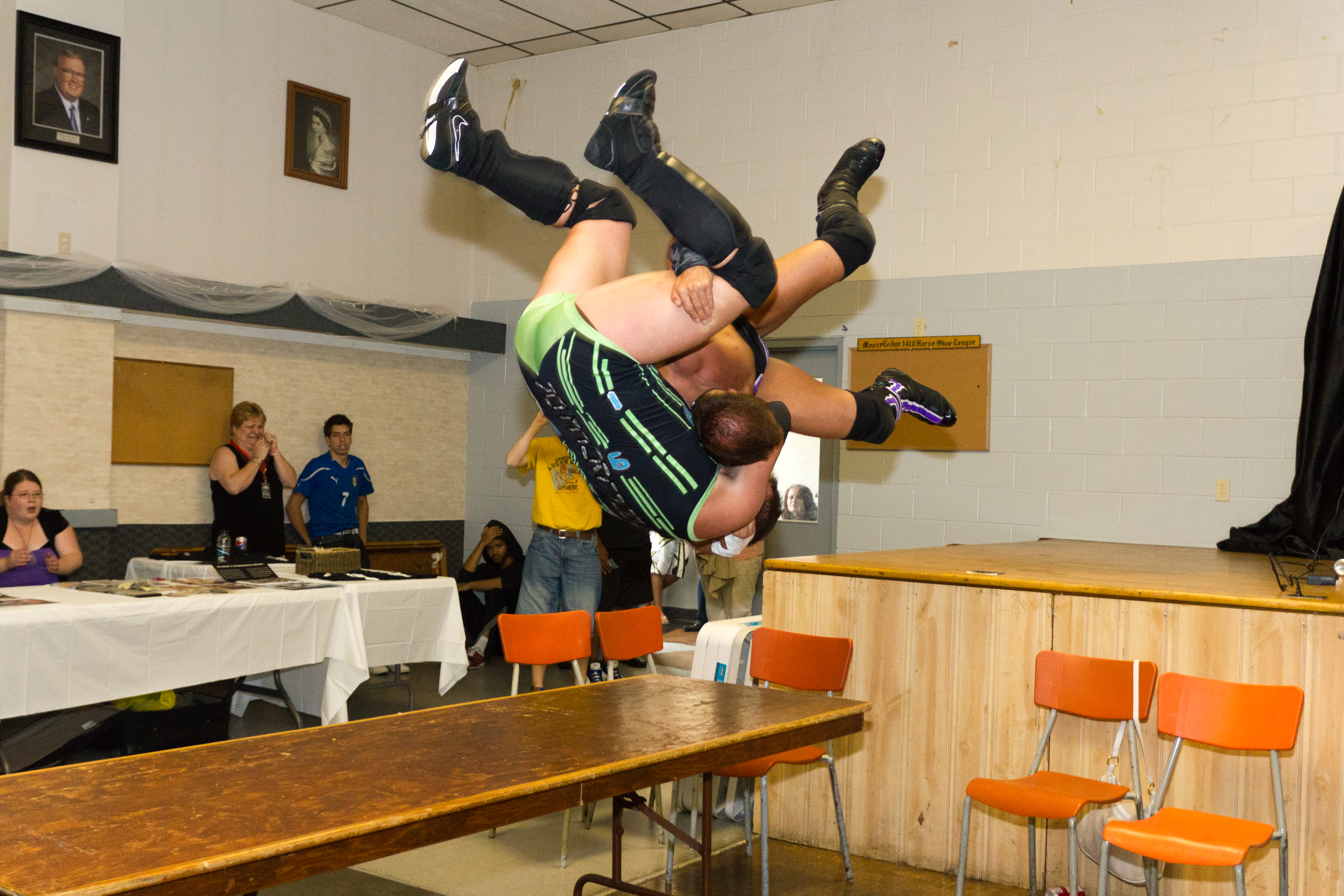
Derek Wylde executing a Death Valley driver which will put Scotty O'Shea (in green) through a table.

Also known as the Death Valley Bomb in Japan, this move is performed from a fireman's carry. The wrestler throws the opponent off their shoulders and falls in the direction that the opponent's head is facing, driving the opponent's head or back into the mat. Similar to the fireman's carry takeover, with more of an emphasis on targeting the neck. The Death Valley driver was innovated by Louie Spicolli (although he credited Etsuko Mita as the move's originator). Kazuchika Okada uses this move as Heavy Rain. Buddy Murphy uses a pumphandle lift version called Murphy's Law. Velveteen Dream uses a cartwheel version of the move itself called the Dream Valley Driver. Sean O'Haire used a variation that saw him toss his opponent to the opposite side, landing flat onto their back, called the Widow Maker.

==== Inverted Death Valley driver ====
Also known as the Victoria Driver or Burning Hammer, this move is executed from an Argentine backbreaker rack position. The wrestler then falls sideways, driving the opponent's head to the mat. This is considered an extremely dangerous move, as the opponent's body cannot roll with the natural momentum of the move to absorb the impact. In a cut-throat variation of this driver, instead of holding the body of the opponent, a wrestler holds the far arm of the opponent across the opponent's own throat and maintains it by holding the opponent's wrist before performing the inverted Death Valley driver. The Inverted Death Valley Driver was innovated by Kotetsu Yamamoto in the 1970s but popularized by Kenta Kobashi as the Burning Hammer. Michael Elgin uses a sit-out variation of the Burning Hammer so as not to hurt the head or neck of his opponent allowing them to roll left or right, while Tyler Reks' Burning Hammer saw hers flip the opponent onto their stomach before impact (as in an inverted Fireman's Carry Takeover).

==== Side Death Valley driver ====
A variation between the regular Death Valley driver and the inverted one. The opponent lies on their side on the shoulders of the wrestler, facing either the opposite or the same direction as the wrestler, with the wrestler holding the opponent by the lower leg and either the head or lower arm. The wrestler then falls sideways, driving the opponent down to the mat shoulder and neck first. Claudio Castagnoli used this move a few times and now uses it as his signature move, named the Swissblade.

=== Fireman's carry drop ===
The attacking wrestler first lifts their opponent over their shoulders in a fireman's carry position. The attacking wrestler then pushes the opponent forward and off their body, slamming the opponent face-down onto the mat. The wrestler may land in a kneeling or squatting position. This move was used by Mojo Rawley.

=== Fireman's carry headlock spinning elbow drop ===
The wrestler performs the fireman's carry from a standing position, then tosses the opponent off their shoulders and drops the opponent into a Headlock Elbow Drop. It is currently used by Hirooki Goto as the GTW.

=== Fireman's carry sitout side powerslam ===
The wrestler performs the fireman's carry from a standing position, then swings the opponent around and drops them Sitout side powerslam. The move is used by Hiromu Takahashi as the Dynamite Plunger and JD McDonagh as the Ireland's Call.

=== Fireman's carry slam ===
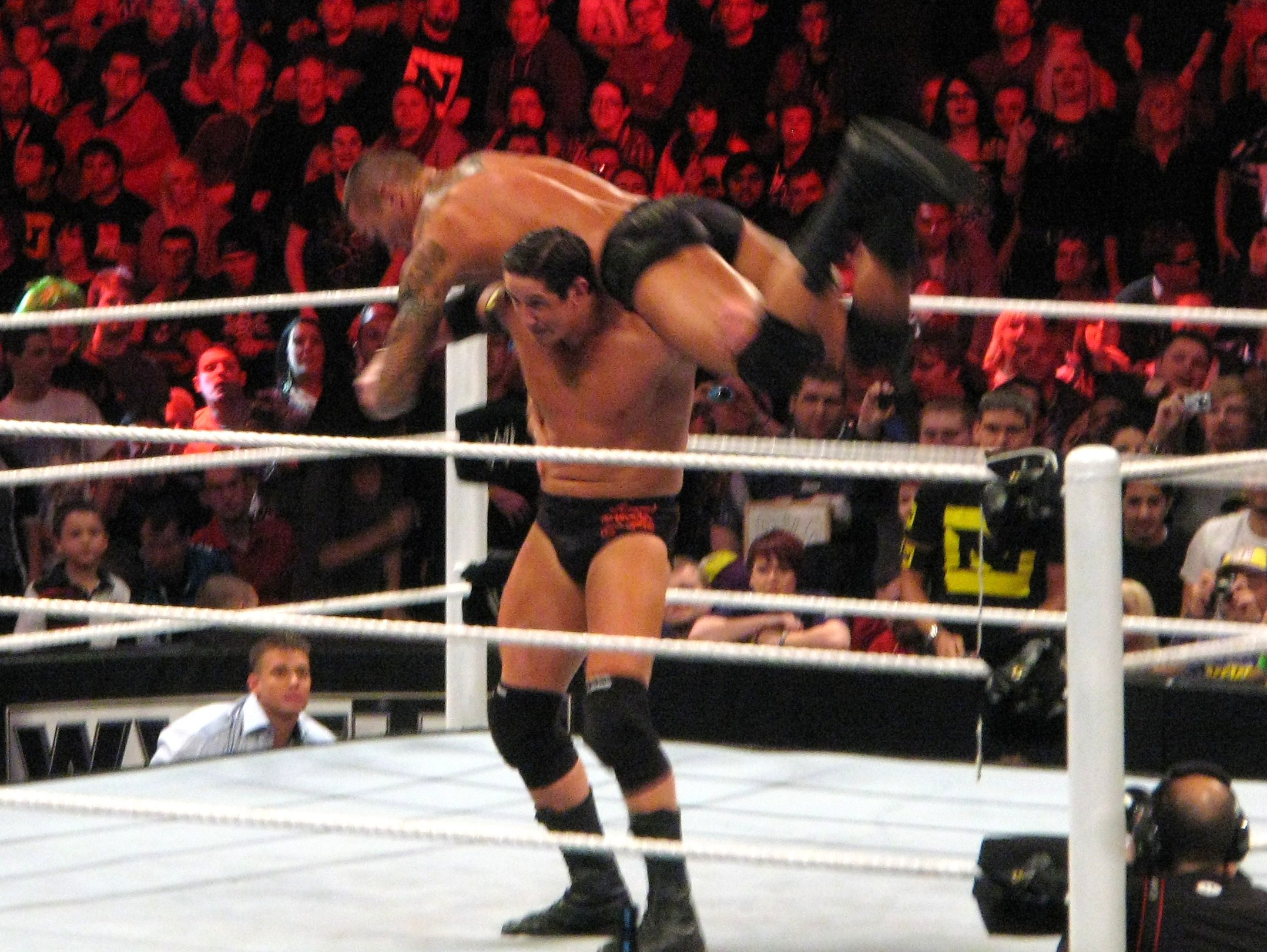
Wade Barrett preparing to perform a fireman's carry slam (Wasteland) on Randy Orton

The wrestler first drapes an opponent over their shoulders in a fireman's carry position. The wrestler then takes hold of the thigh and arm of the opponent, which are hung over the front side of the wrestler, and leans forward, pulling the opponent over their head and shoulders, slamming them down on their back in front of the wrestler. A rolling fireman's carry slam is a variation that sees the wrestler keep hold of the opponent and run forward before slamming the opponent to the ground, using the momentum to roll over the opponent and is referred to as a Steam Roller, Rolling Hills or Finlay Roll. A variation of this move from corner middle rope exists and has been used by Mr. Kennedy which he called the Green Bay Plunge. A swinging leghook fireman's carry slam is another variation that involves a wrestler holding the wrist of the opponent while putting their head under the opponent's chest. Then after grabbing the opponents nearest leg, the wrestler lifts the opponent's leg outward before swinging forward using the opponent's momentum and slamming them down back-first. A neckbreaker variation also exists where the wrestler lifts the opponent on their shoulders in a fireman's carry, then lifts their opponent over and grabs the head before slamming them down in a neckbreaker slam. Bobby Roode used the neckbreaker version as a finisher, which he calls Roode Bomb. Keith Lee uses a powerslam or jackhammer version as a finisher that he calls the Big Bang Catastrophe.

Another version of this move sees the wrestler using which ever near hand on the opponent's chest to push and throw them upwards while maintaining the hold on the opponent's inside thigh to slam them over to one's side while remaining standing. Diamond Dallas Page used the standing version. This move has also been transitioned into a sidewalk slam, a fall forward side slam, and a chokeslam.

=== Fireman's carry takeover ===
John Cena performs an Attitude Adjustment (standing fireman's carry powerslam) on Kane.

There are two versions of the fireman's carry takeover used in professional wrestling. The first is borrowed from amateur wrestling and sees the wrestler kneel down on one knee and simultaneously grab hold of one of the opponent's thighs with one arm and one of the opponent's arms with their other arm. The wrestler then pulls the opponent onto their shoulders and rises up slightly, using the motion to push the opponent off their shoulders, flipping them to the mat onto their back. The other closely resembles a Death Valley driver. The wrestler performs the fireman's carry from a standing position, then tosses the opponent off their shoulders as they drop down to their knees, causing the opponent to land on their back. The standing variant is a higher impact version of the move because the wrestler falls from a greater height, and is a move closely associated with John Cena through his use of it as his finishing maneuver, which he calls the Attitude Adjustment (formerly the F.U.). Another variation sees the move done from the top or middle rope, used occasionally by Cena as the Super Attitude Adjustment or Avalanche Attitude Adjustment.

==== Olympic slam ====
The wrestler holds the opponent's wrist while putting their head underneath the opponent's chest, grabs the inside of one of the opponents legs, then lifts the opponent up onto their shoulders while falling backwards. This move was popularized by and named in reference to Olympic gold medalist Kurt Angle, who also dubbed it the Angle Slam as an alternate name.

==== Samoan drop ====
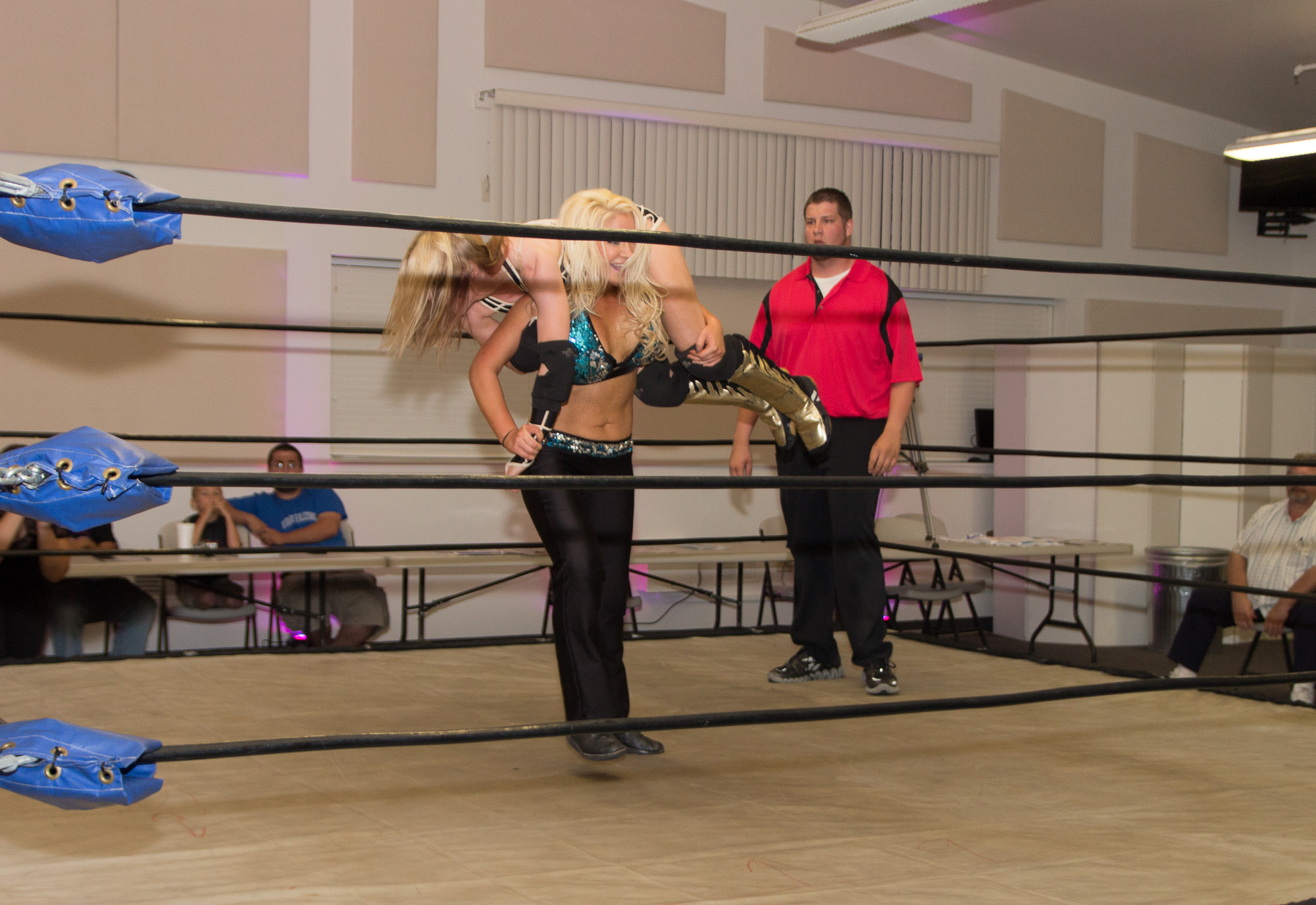
Jillian Hall setting up to perform the Samoan drop on Xandra Bale.

The wrestler drapes an opponent over their shoulders in a fireman's carry position then falls backwards, driving the opponent down to the mat on their back. A one-handed, swinging leg hook, and a twisting version are also possible. This move is most often performed by wrestlers of Samoan heritage (typically from the Anoaʻi family, including The Rock, Rikishi and Roman Reigns (who uses the one-handed variant), as well as a pop-up version used by Umaga, Nia Jax, Jacob Fatu and The Usos). A top rope variant was also regularly performed by Scott Steiner, while Ronda Rousey uses the twisting version as a finisher, calling it Piper's Pit. This move was not only used just by wrestlers of Samoan heritage. Wrestlers such as Terry Gordy and Viscera have used this move as well. Mike Rotunda also used this move as a finisher during his run as VK Wallstreet and I.R.S., calling it the "Stock Market Crash". WWE Legend Tatanka also used this as a finisher, calling it the End of the Trail.

=== Flapjack ===
Also can be called a pancake slam, this maneuver involves the attacking wrestler lifting their opponent up in a quick motion while holding a single leg or both legs. Usually, the opponent's upper body and head is lifted above a shoulder of the attacker, while the legs have been caught. The attacker then falls on their back, bringing opponent's legs with them. The opponent lands face-first into the mat, with their upper body damaged. The Single-leg version is more commonly used. Former NXT Rookie Percy Watson used a variant in which he holds his opponent in a fireman's carry before transitioning into a flapjack, dubbing this move Percycution.

A hotshot is referred to when a flapjack is performed so that the opponent falls across the ring ropes. The fireman's carry flapjack sees the wrestler lift the opponent on to a fireman's carry, and then throw the upper body of the opponent away from the wrestler while the wrestler falls backwards, driving the opponent down to the mat chest first.

==== Pop-up ====
Also called a "free-fall" or "push-up flapjack". A pop-up is a flapjack where the attacker, upon facing an opponent rushing towards them, flings the opponent vertically up into the air without holding on to the opponent. The standing attacker or the airborne opponent is free to carry out an attack after the pop-up. Examples of attacks from the standing wrestler include performing a European uppercut to the falling opponent, or catching the opponent and then performing a sitout powerbomb. Examples of attacks from the airborne opponent include executing a dropkick on the standing opponent. Tag teams may also utilize the pop-up by throwing an opponent to a teammate who would execute an attack.

== Full nelson ==
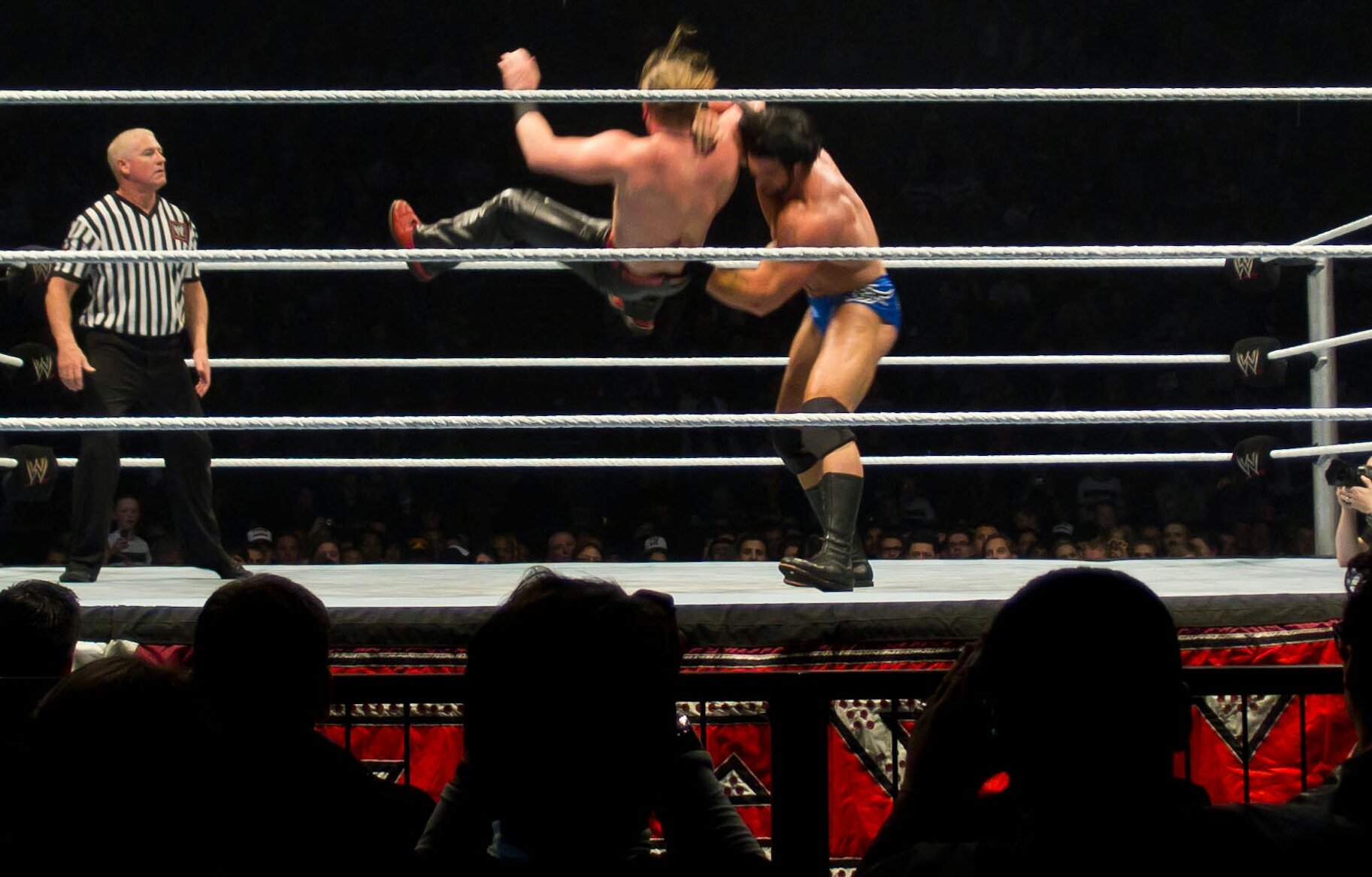
Mason Ryan performing a full nelson slam on Curt Hawkins

=== Full nelson slam ===
In this move, the attacker places their opponent in a full nelson hold and uses it to lift them off the ground. With the opponent in the air, the attacker removes one arm (so their opponent is now in a half nelson) and slams the opponent back-first into the mat. Another similar variation, known as a double chickenwing slam, sees the wrestler apply double chickenwing instead of a full nelson before slamming the opponent. Aron Stevens used the full nelson version.

==== Inverted full nelson slam ====
Also known as the reverse full nelson slam, this variation sees the attacker tuck and slide their arms under the opponent's armpits and then clutch the opponent's lower jaw. Then, the attacker lifts the opponent before falling forward to slam the opponent back-first into the mat. This move is used as a finisher by Luke Gallows, dubbed the "Gallows Pole"

=== Half nelson slam ===
The wrestler stands behind, slightly to one side of and facing the opponent. The wrestler reaches under one of the opponent's arms with their corresponding arm and places the palm of their hand on the back of the opponent's neck, thereby forcing the arm of the opponent up into the air to complete the half nelson. The wrestler then lifts the opponent up, turns, and falls forward, slamming the opponent back-first into the mat.

== Giant swing ==
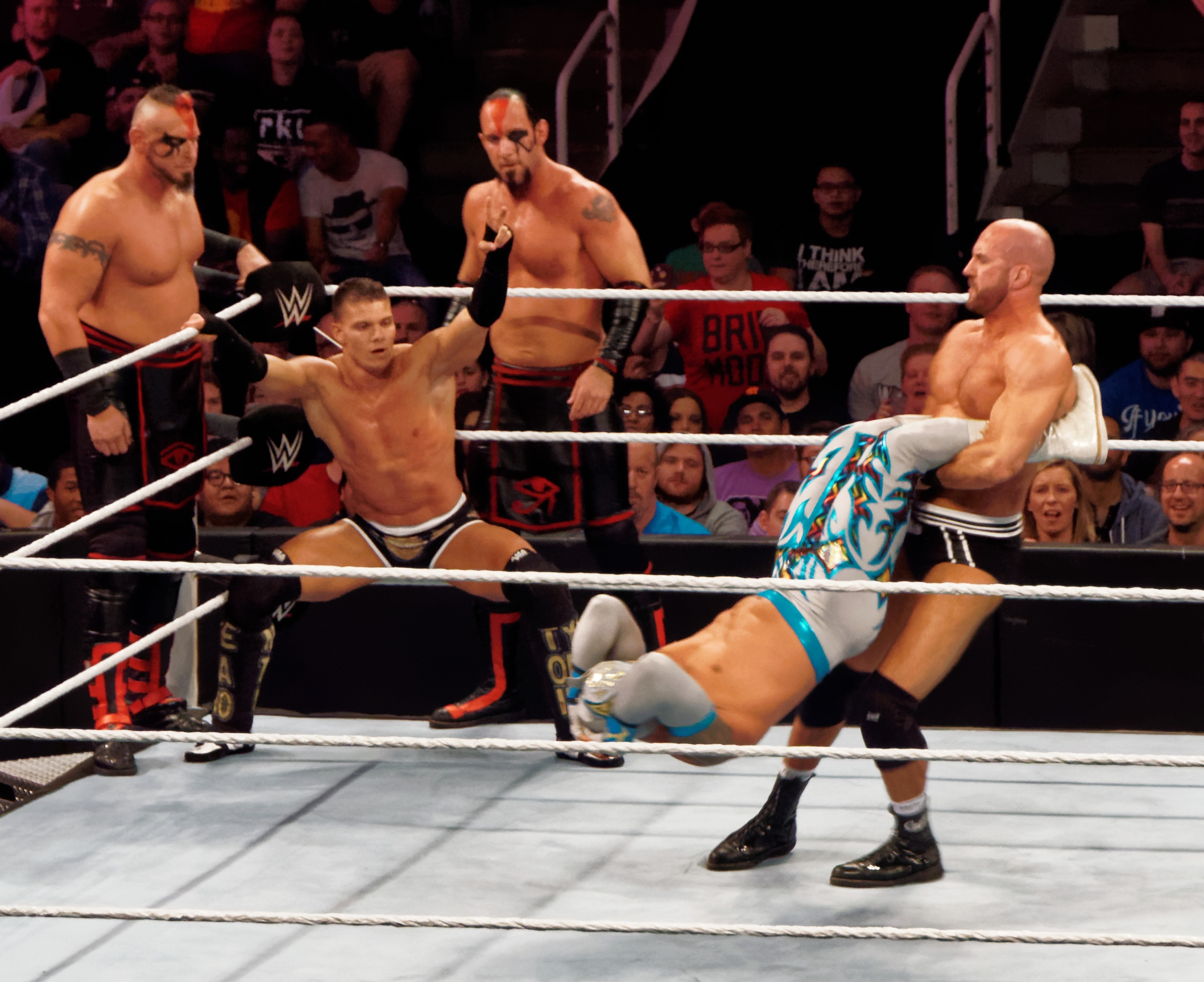
Cesaro performing the Cesaro Swing (giant swing) on Sin Cara

A giant swing starts with an opponent lying on the mat, face up, and the wrestler at the opponent's feet. The wrestler takes the opponent's legs up under their arms, similar to the setup for a catapult, but instead pivots, spinning around to lift the opponent off the mat. The attacker may release the opponent to send them flying, or simply slow until the back of the opponent returns to the ground. AEW's Claudio Castagnoli uses the giant swing as a signature move.

== Guillotine drop ==
This move sees the attacking wrestler lift the opponent in a standing guillotine choke and drop the opponent to the mat, lower spine first. This causes an effect to the whole spine and neck. A variation involving a standing double underhook rather than the guillotine choke also exists. It is used by Angel Garza as the Wing Clipper.

== Gorilla press ==
Also known as a Military press, the attack sees the wrestler lift their opponent up above their head with an overhead press as used in weight lifting. The attacking wrestler may repeatedly press the opponent overhead to show their strength prior to dropping them.

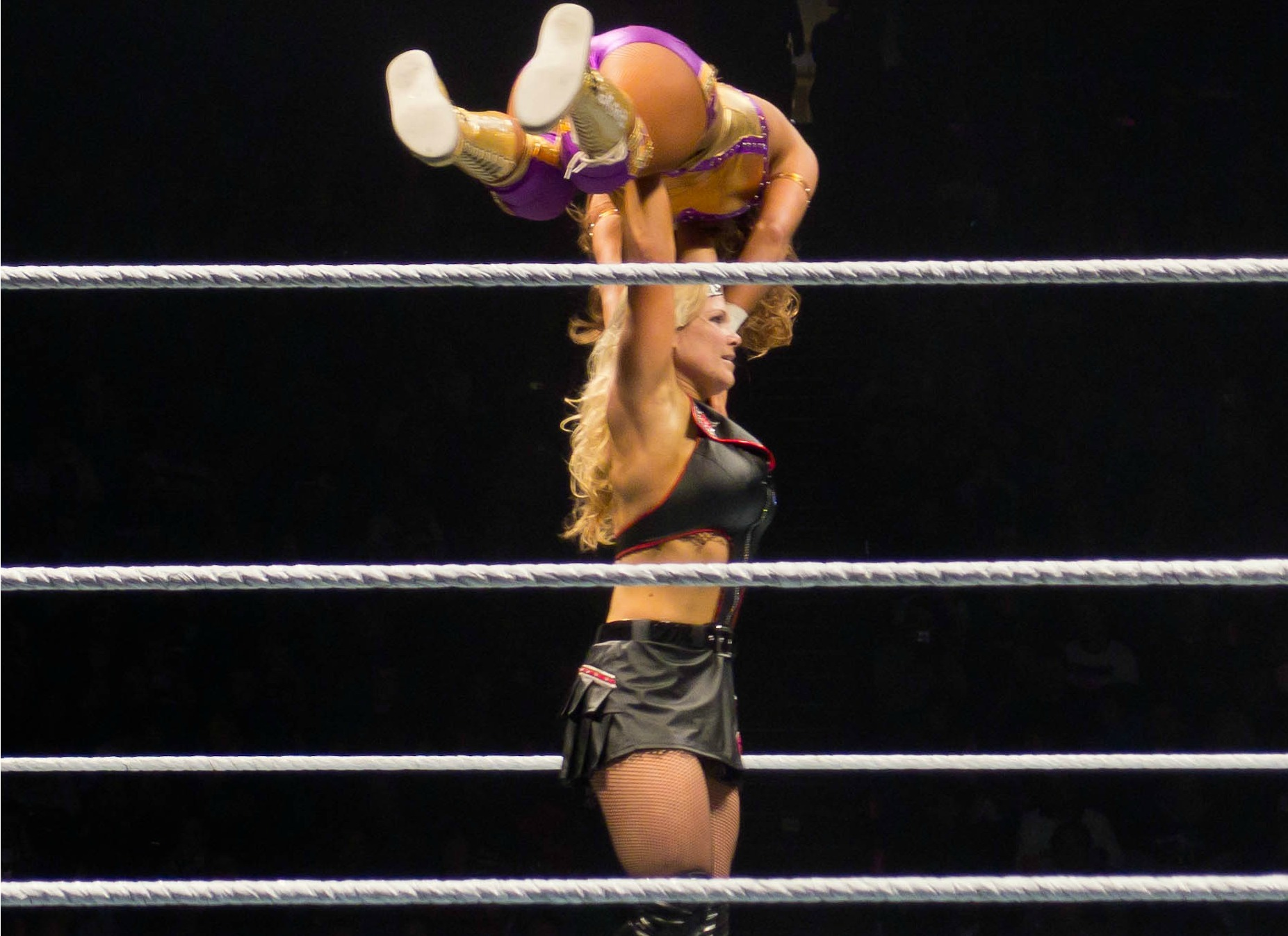
Beth Phoenix setting up a military press drop on Eve Torres

=== Gorilla press drop ===
The wrestler lifts their opponent up over their head with arms fully extended, then drops the opponent down face-first in front or back. This was the finisher for wrestlers Chyna and Ultimate Warrior. It is a popular technique for very large wrestlers because it emphasizes their height and power.

=== Gorilla press slam ===
This slam sees a wrestler first lift their opponent up over their head with arms fully extended, before lowering the arm under the head of the opponent so that the opponent falls to that side while flipping over and landing on their back. This move is also called the military press slam. Some wrestlers perform this maneuver by doing a lifting motion up and down or may hold the opponent in place before dropping them as a way to emphasize their raw strength. The British Bulldog used it regularly as signature move.

Another variation of this move called a Deadly Driver sees the attacker performing this move to an opponent who is positioned on the top rope by the attacker themselves or as a counter to the opponent attempting a diving attack. This move can be done in the standard fashion or in a smooth throwing motion. A double-team version of this move also exists.

== Gutbuster ==
A gutbuster is any move in which the wrestler lifts their opponent up and jumps or drops them so that the opponent's stomach impacts against part of the wrestler's body, usually the knee. A basic gutbuster is often called a stomach breaker and is essentially the same as a backbreaker but with the opponent facing the opposite direction. This similarity with backbreakers is reflected in almost every gutbuster variation, which if inverted would become backbreakers and vice versa.

=== Elevated gutbuster ===
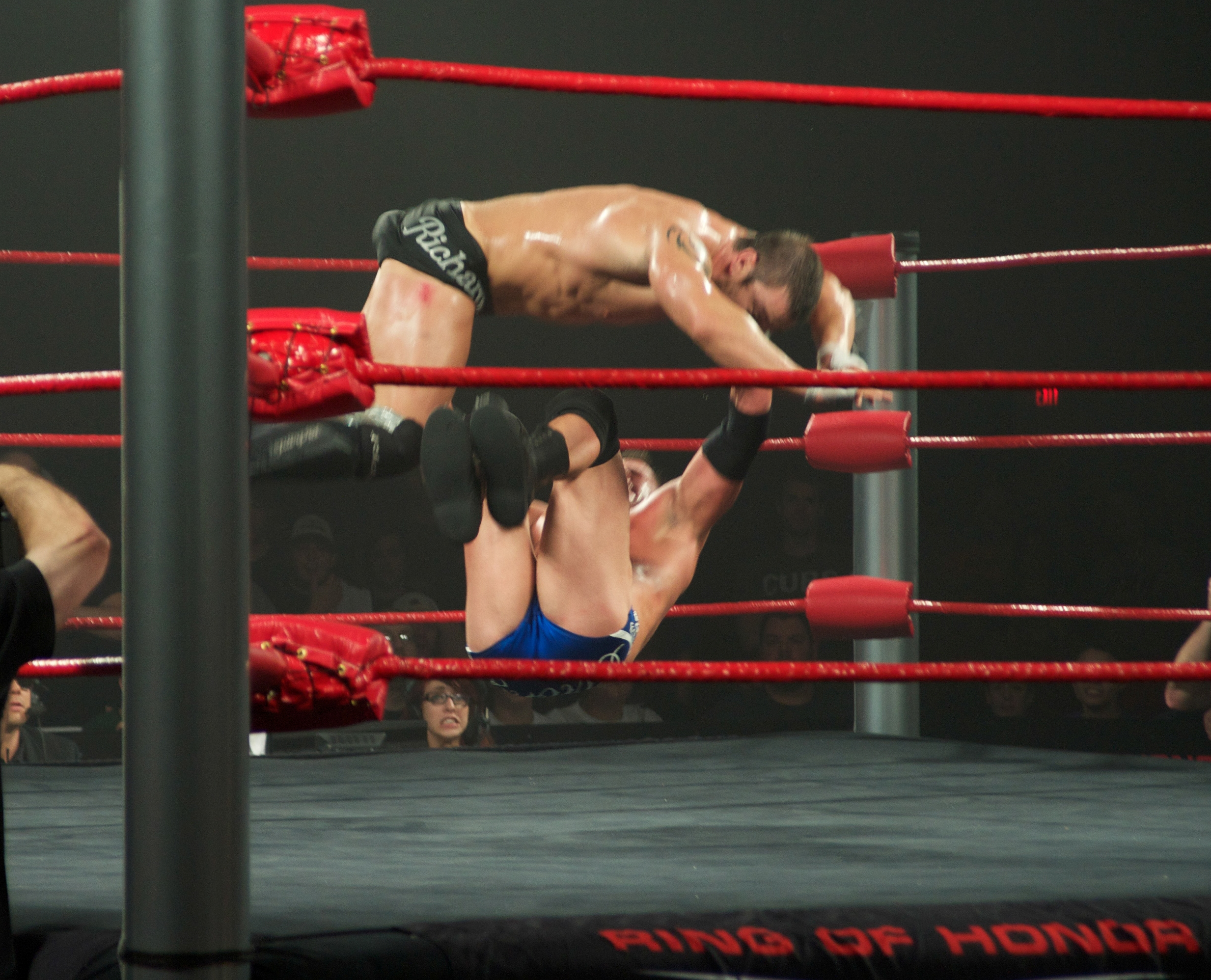
Roderick Strong in the last moments of executing an elevated gutbuster on Davey Richards. This was transitioned from a fireman's carry, a common version of the gutbuster.

This variation of a gutbuster sees an opponent first elevated into a high lifting transition hold before being dropped down for a gutbuster. Taiji Ishimori uses a Single underhook version of the move as his finisher calling it the Bloody Cross while T. J. Perkins uses a double chickenwing version.

==== Fireman's carry gutbuster ====
This is the most common version of the elevated gutbuster and sees the attacking wrestler first lift the opponent up across their shoulders; a position known as a fireman's carry, before then dropping down to one knee while simultaneously elevating the opponent over their head forcing them to drop down and impact their exposed knee. Wrestler Kaitlyn uses this as one of her signature move. A slight variation of this uses a modified double knee gutbuster and sees the attacking wrestler drop down to their back while bringing both knees up for the opponent to land on. Fred Rosser used the move as his finisher calling it Gut Check. The move was popularized by Roderick Strong, who calls it Death By Roderick.

==== Gutbuster drop ====
An elevated gutbuster in which an attacking wrestler would lift an opponent up, stomach-first, across one of their shoulders before dropping down to their knees forcing the opponent's stomach to impact on the wrestler's shoulder.

=== Gorilla press gutbuster ===
A maneuver in which the user drops the opponent directly in front of them while putting their own knee out in front of them. The victim lands stomach or ribs first on the knee, made more impactful by the long drop. the double-knee variant was popularized by Xavier Woods.

=== Rib breaker ===
A rib breaker is a version of a gutbuster that involves the wrestler scooping the opponent up by reaching between the legs of the opponent with one arm and reaching around their back from the same side with their other arm. The wrestler then lifts their opponent up so they are horizontal across the wrestler's body. From here the wrestler drops down to one knee, forcing the opponent to drop stomach/rib-first against the wrestler's raised knee.

== Headlock takedown ==
Also known as a spinning headlock takedown and side headlock takeover. This throw starts with the wrestler catching the opponent in a side headlock. The wrestler turns and twists their body so their back is horizontally against the opponent's torso. The wrestler turns to one side (depending on which hand is used to catch the opponent) while still catching the opponent with the headlock. Therefore, the opponent is slammed back-first into the mat after being almost "forcibly flipped" over the wrestler's back (as the wrestler turns to their sides).

=== Headlock driver ===
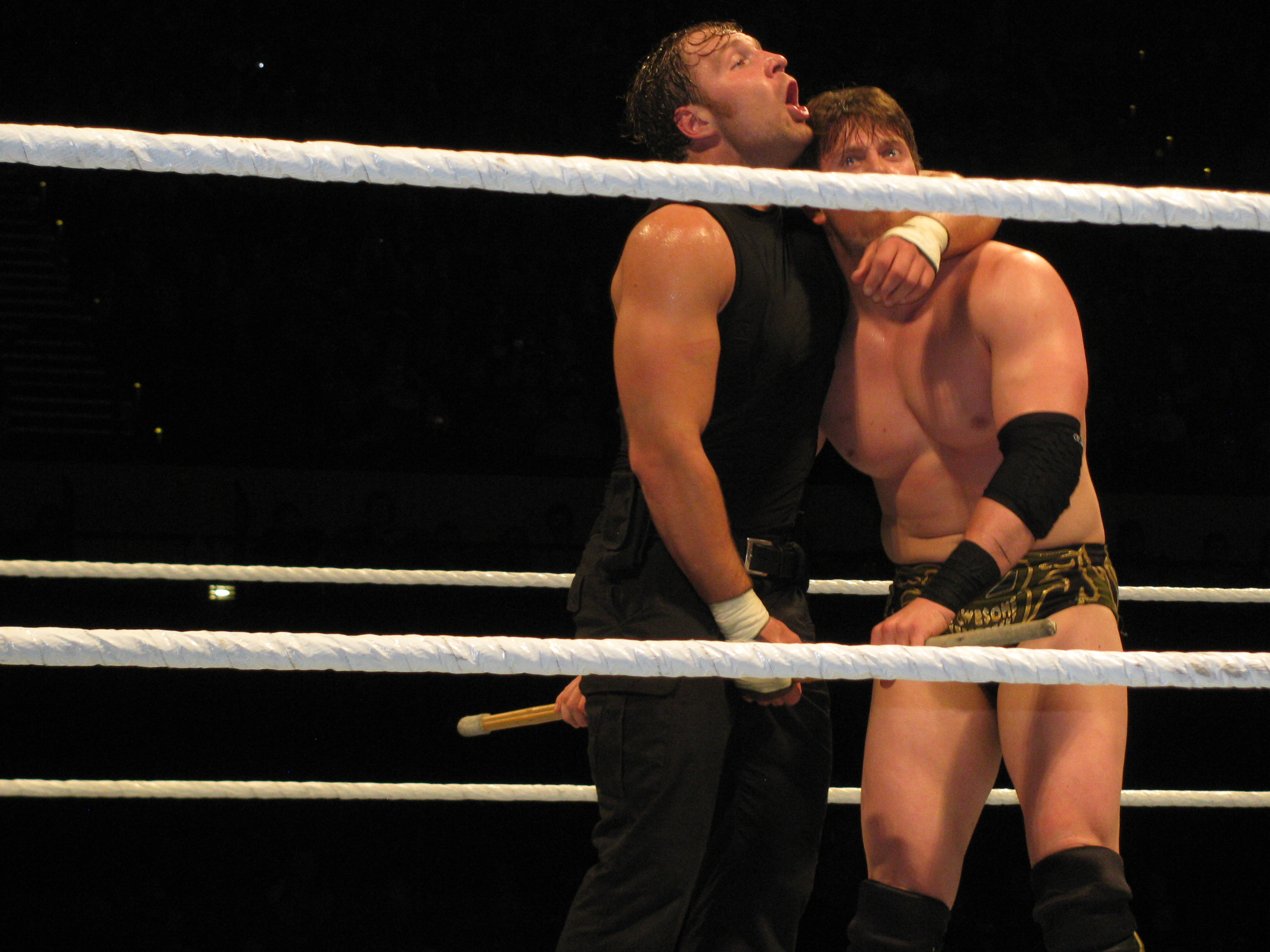
Dean Ambrose setting up his finisher Dirty Deeds (headlock driver) on The Miz.

Similar to the snapmare driver, the wrestler applies a side headlock before dropping down on either their chest or their knees and driving the opponent's head down to the mat forehead first, with the side headlock usually using whichever near leg on the same side the opponent is standing on, lifting it upwards and swinging behind them to power the throw and drives the opponent's head down to the mat forehead first. The wrestling may also sweep one or both the opponent's legs with their own leg for greater impact.. This was the original version of the finisher used by Jon Moxley (formerly as Dean Ambrose), known as Dirty Deeds before reusing as a regular move (Paradigm Shift) in 2019. Ethan Carter III (EC3) uses this as his finisher and he calls it the One Percenter. WWE superstar Bayley utilized this move during her indie days (then known as Davina Rose) dubbing it the Rose Plant. She started using a variant of this move where she hooks the opponents arm around the leg and planting the opponent in the canvas. She started using this move again in late 2019.

== Headscissors takedown ==
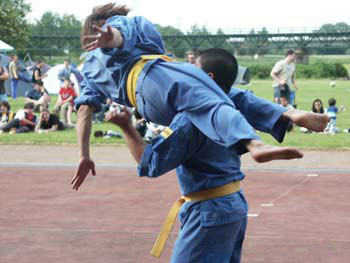
Flying Scissors to the neck, executed during the 2004 "Gio-To-Festival" in Minden, Germany.

Known as tijeras (scissors) in Lucha Libre. This move is performed with the wrestler's legs scissored around the opponent's head, dragging the opponent into a forced forward somersault as the wrestler falls to the mat. It is often erroneously called the Hurricanrana in American wrestling, but due to the lack of a double leg cradle pinning combination, it is a standard headscissors takedown.

Rey Mysterio uses a standing spinning version of this move which sees him, while standing behind a standing opponent facing the same direction, jump, placing himself on both the opponents shoulders, spinning around 180 degrees, and executing a backflip to land chest first to flip the opponent onto their back. This version is known as the Mysterio Rana. He was also known to transition into this move from a cartwheel to then jump onto the opponent's shoulders in his earlier career. It is possible to stay seated to reach back to hook the opponents legs to attempt to score a pinfall.

=== Handstand headscissors takedown ===
This move is performed when the attacking wrestler, in a handstand position, scissors their legs around the opponent's head and follows with the headscissors takedown. There are multiple variations of the handstand headscissors takedown. For example, in one variation, the attacking wrestler rolls forward after scissoring their legs around their opponent's head; in another, the opponent rolls backwards into a handstand position to follow with a headscissors and the takedown. It is commonly used by Kalisto and Cedric Alexander. This move was also popularized by Trish Stratus, who used it as a signature move, called the Stratusphere.

=== Tilt-a-whirl headscissors takedown ===
This move is actually a counter. Usually, the opponent grabs the attacking wrestler (as if they were performing a sidewalk slam), the attacking counters and swings their body upwards, then scissors their legs around the opponent's head, spins around the opponent's body, and swings their legs downwards, resulting in the headscissors takedown.

=== Hurricanrana ===
Though it is commonly referred to as a Hurricanrana, the original Spanish name for this maneuver is the Huracánrana (English: Hurricane frog). The name was taken from its innovator, Mexican luchador Huracán Ramírez. Sometimes referred to as a reverse victory roll, it is a headscissors takedown (tijeras) that ends in a double leg cradle pinning hold. A rana is any double-leg cradle. Another notable user of the move is French wrestler René Ben Chemoul, who was documented on tape as using the move as early as 1950; his version of the maneuver, which would be more directed on a head slam, would become the catalyst to the creation of what is now known as the Frankensteiner. A somersault version also exists, called the Dragonrana.

==== Frankensteiner ====
This move is derived from the original huracánrana. It is described as a headscissors take down that is performed against a running opponent. The wrestler jumps on the shoulders of the charging opponent and performs a back flip. The move varies from the hurricanrana as when the opponent lands – they would land on their head as opposed to their back.

The move was innovated by René Ben Chemoul. It was named the Frankensteiner by Scott Steiner, who used it as a finishing move. The move also has a variation where the opponent is sitting on the top rope, that variation is also referred to as a Frankensteiner that Scott has used as a finisher also.

Another variation of the Frankensteiner sees a grounded wrestler first "kip-up" on to a standing opponent's shoulders, this is where a wrestler rolls on to the back of their shoulders bringing their legs up and kicking forward to build momentum to lift themselves off the floor and on to the standing opponent.

==== Hurricanrana driver ====
The wrestler performs a headscissors takedown to a seated or kneeling opponent, driving them head first into the mat. Ruby Soho and Kalisto use this move in some of their matches.

Reverse Frankensteiner

Also known as an inverted frankensteiner or a poison rana, this move uses a standard Frankensteiner, but instead of performing the move facing the opponent's face, it is done facing the back of the opponent.

==== Rope-aided hurricanrana ====
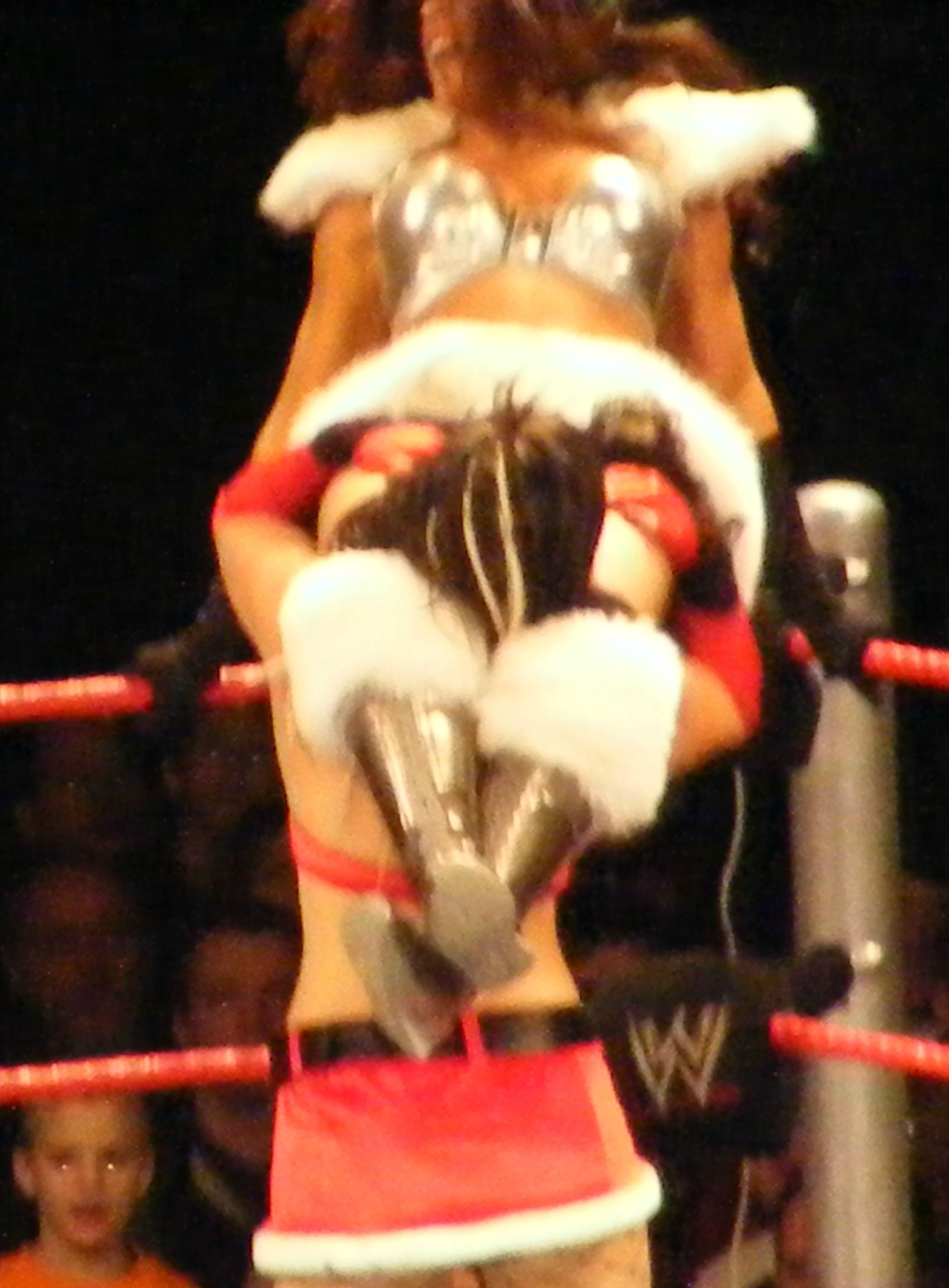
Mickie James performing a rope-aided hurricanrana on Katie Lea Burchill

This maneuver is also known as swinging hurricanrana. The attacking wrestler, beginning on the corner, uses the top ropes for leverage to scissor their legs around the opponent (usually an oncoming opponent) and swings to perform the hurricanrana. This hurricanrana variation was popularized by Mickie James, as she named the move herself Mick-a-rana.

== Hip toss ==
The wrestler stands next to the opponent with both facing the same direction, and the wrestler hooks their closest arm underneath and behind the opponent's closest armpit. The wrestler then quickly lifts the opponent up with that arm and throws them forward, which would lead the wrestler to flip the opponent on to their back to end the move. There is also a sitout variation, in which the wrestler performs a normal hip toss and then lands in a seated position.

== Iconoclasm ==
This top rope flipping slam sees a wrestler stand under an opponent, who is situated on the top turnbuckle, turn their back to this opponent while taking hold of the opponent's arms from below, often holding underneath the opponent's arm pits. The wrestler would then throw the opponent forward while falling to a seated position, flipping the opponent over in midair, and slamming them down to the mat back first. CIMA uses both this move as well as a straight jacket version called the Goriconoslasm. The wrestler may fall forward, kneel down, or remain standing while executing this move also.

Lance Archer, while using the original move as well, also uses a variation of this move referring to both called the Blackout. From a standing position, he reaches between an opponent's legs with his stronger arm and reaches around their back from the same side with their weaker arm before then lifting the opponent up over his shoulder. He then lifts the opponent holding underneath their armpits to execute a kneeling version of the slam.

== Irish whip ==
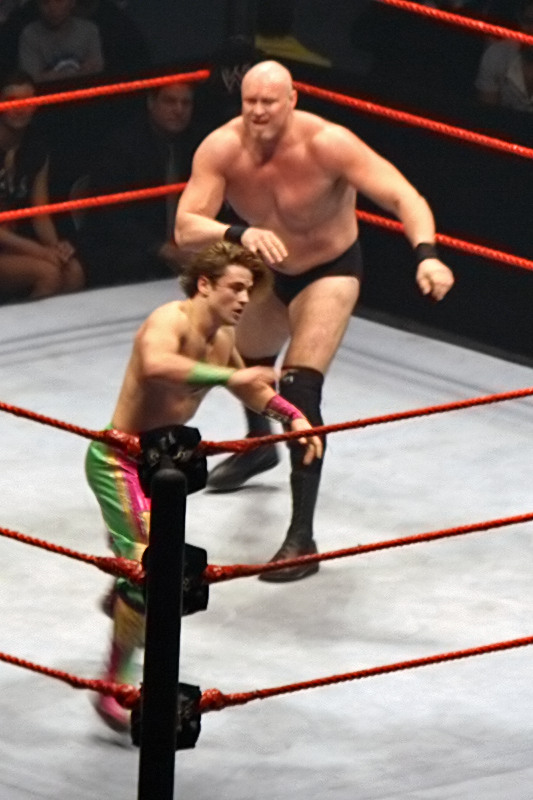
Gene Snitsky Irish whips Brian Kendrick to the turnbuckle.

Also called a hammer throw. A move in which the wrestler grabs one of their opponent's arms and spins, swinging the opponent into an obstacle such as the ring ropes, a turnbuckle, or the stairs leading into the ring. An Irish whip into the ring ropes is usually used to set the opponent up for another technique as he/she bounces off. An Irish whip into the turnbuckles usually sees the opponent remain in the corner, allowing a follow-up attack from the wrestler; the opponent may remain standing or slump to the ground, usually in a seated position, which will vary the attack. One occasional use of the Irish whip is to try to "hit for the cycle" by whipping one's opponent into each corner in turn. Some professional wrestlers can use this move as an advantage by running up the turnbuckle and using a high flying move.

The move acquired its name due to its association with Irish wrestler Danno O'Mahony.

== Jawbreaker ==
A jawbreaker is any move in which the wrestler slams their opponent's jaw against a part of the wrestler's body, usually their knee, head or shoulder.

=== Shoulder jawbreaker ===
Also known as an inverted stunner, the wrestler stands facing the opponent, places their shoulder under the jaw of the opponent and holds the opponent in place before falling into a sitting or kneeling position, driving the jaw of the opponent into their shoulder.

=== Sitout jawbreaker ===
A standard jawbreaker is seen when a wrestler (either stands facing or not facing opponent) places their head under the jaw of the opponent and holds the opponent in place before falling into a sitting or kneeling position, driving the jaw of the opponent into the top of their head. Sometimes it is also used to counter a headlock by the opponent.

=== Stunner ===
A stunner is a three-quarter facelock jawbreaker. It involves an attacking wrestler applying a three-quarter facelock (reaching behind the head of an opponent, thus pulling the opponent's jaw above the wrestler's shoulder) before falling to a seated position and forcing the defender's jaw to drop down on the shoulder of the attacking wrestler. This move was innovated by Michael Hayes and popularized by Stone Cold Steve Austin.

== Mat slam ==
A mat slam is any move in which the wrestler forces the back of the opponent's head into the mat which does not involve a headlock or facelock. If these are used then the move is considered a type of DDT (if the wrestler falls backwards) or bulldog. Some neckbreakers also slam the back of the opponent's head into the mat, but the attacker is back-to-back with the attack's receiver. A standard mat slam involves the wrestler grabbing hold of the opponent by their head or hair and pulling back, forcing the back of the opponent's head into the mat.

=== Belly-to-back inverted mat slam ===
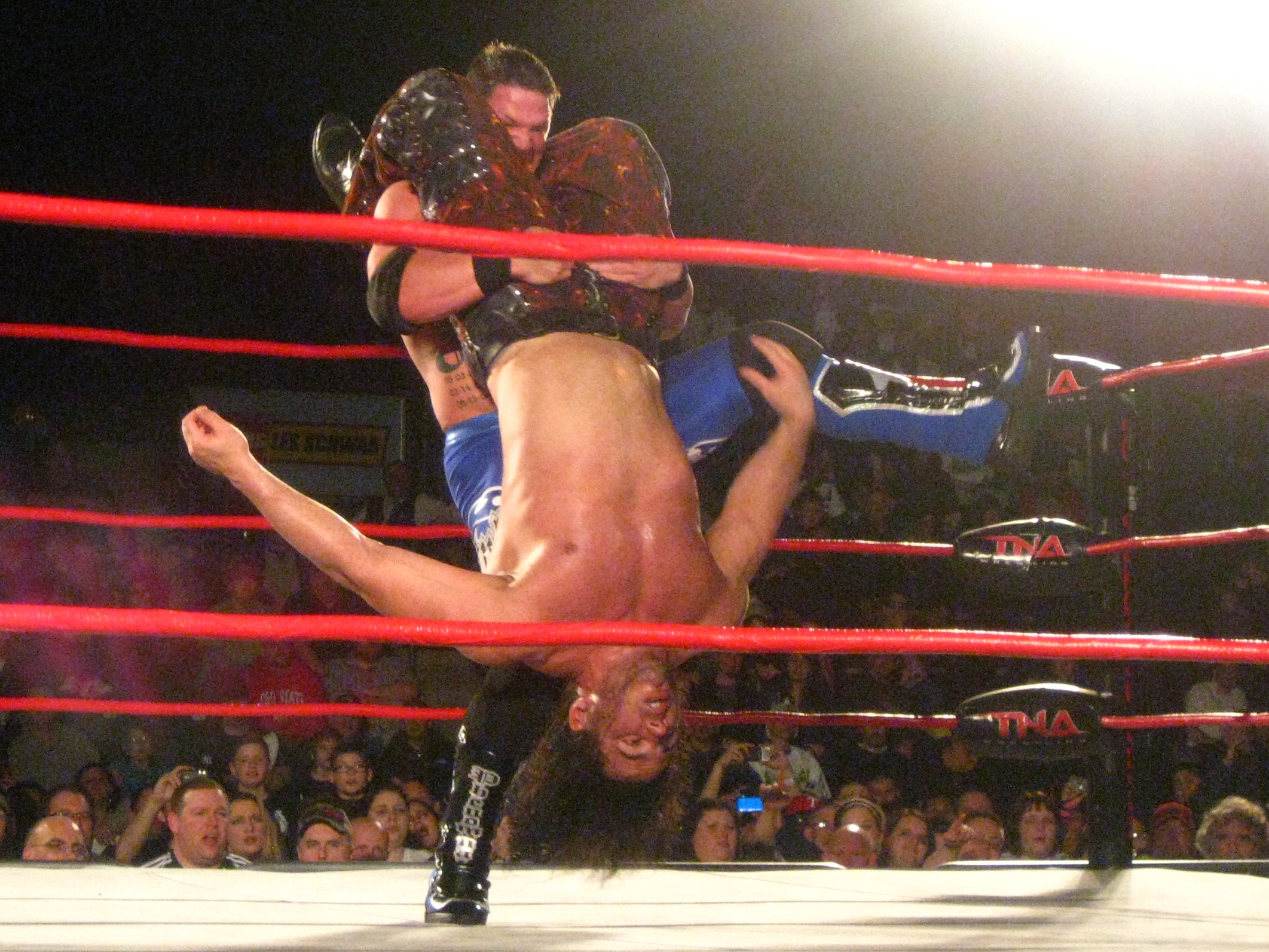
Styles preparing to perform the Styles Clash on Matt Hardy.

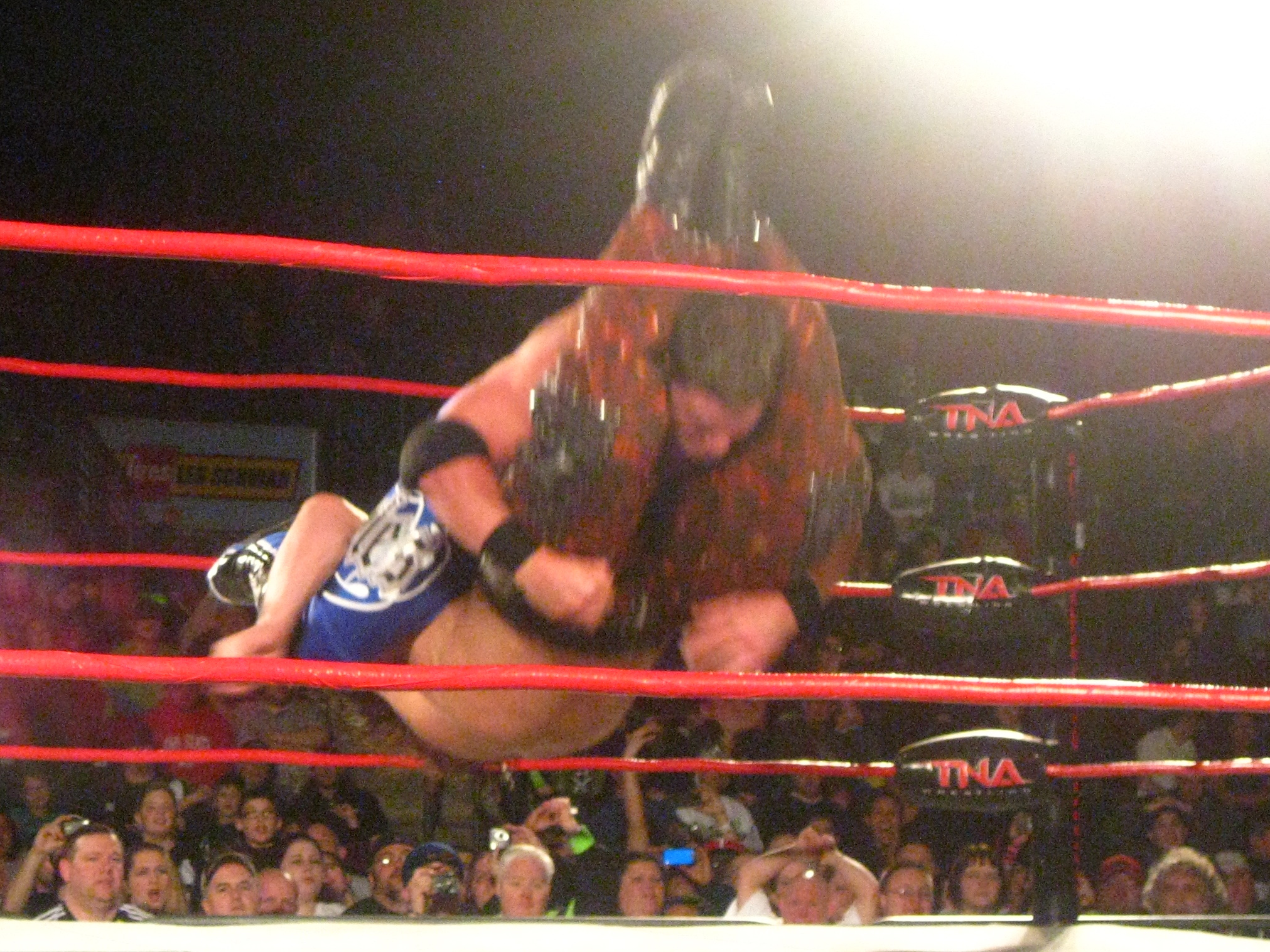
Styles performing the Styles Clash on Matt Hardy.

From a position in which the opponent is bent forward against the wrestler's midsection, the wrestler grabs around their opponent's midsection and lifts so that the opponent is held upside down, facing in the same direction as the wrestler. The wrestler then hooks both arms of the opponent using their legs, and then falls forward planting the opponent's body into the mat face-first. The move often sees the wrestler keep their legs hooked under the arms of the opponent after hitting the move, using the underhooking technique to turn the opponent on to their back into a Rana style pinning position. This move was innovated by Col. DeBeers and was made famous by A.J. Styles, who refers to the move as the Styles Clash. Styles performs the maneuver with a variation, as seen in the photos to the right: he does not hook the opponent's arms before performing the slam, but takes two steps and moves his legs in front of the opponent's arms enabling him to use his legs to cover the shoulders for a pin. This variant is later utilized by former WWE Diva Michelle McCool, who referred to the move as the Faith Breaker. Claudio Castagnoli uses a variation called the Neutralizer where he grapevines the opponents leg with his arm similar to a cradle piledriver. El Phantasmo uses a cross-arm Variation called CRII, where he lifts his opponent up and he lets him fall face first into the mat.

=== Cobra clutch mat slam ===
In this standing version of the normal mat slam, the wrestler stands behind the opponent and uses one arm to place the opponent in a half nelson. The wrestler then uses their free arm to pull the opponent's arm (the same arm to which the wrestler is applying the half nelson) across the face of the opponent. The wrestler then locks their hand to their wrist behind the opponent's neck. The wrestler then pulls back, releasing the hold to force the back of the opponent's head into the mat. Drew McIntyre used a variation of the move earlier in his career in which after placing and holding the opponent in the cobra clutch, saw him walk the opponent backwards to bounce them of the ropes forcing them forwards to then slam them on the back of their head for greater force.

=== Double underhook mat slam ===
The wrestler faces an opponent, overhooks both arms, and then pivots 180° so that the opponent is facing upwards with their head pressed against the upper back or under an arm of the wrestler. The wrestler then drops down to their back, driving the back of the opponent's head and neck into the mat.

=== Rear mat slam ===
As well known as a falling rear mat slam. This move starts with the wrestler standing behind the opponent, and then takes hold of the front of the neck or head, and then falls onto their stomach, driving the opponent's back of the head into the mat first. Another variation of this move sees the wrestler performing a backflip from the top turnbuckle, and as they float over the opponent, they quickly grab the opponent's head or neck with both hands and falls on their stomach to complete the rear mat slam.

==== Sitout rear mat slam ====
The wrestler takes hold of their opponent from behind, holding them by either their hair or head. The wrestler then jumps backwards and falls to a sitting position, driving the back of the opponent's head into the ground between their legs. This was a signature move for Edge, which he called Edge-O-Matic. A variation sees the wrestler run up the corner turnbuckles, perform a backflip over a chasing opponent, and at the same time grab hold of the opponents head and perform the slam. Dustin Rhodes during his time in the WWF/WWE as Goldust used this move dubbing it "Oscar".

=== Sleeper slam ===
This slamming version of a headlock takedown sees a wrestler apply a sleeper hold to the opponent, then falls face first to the ground, pulling the opponent down with them and driving the back and head of the opponent into the ground. Heath uses a jumping variation of the move. A lifting version also exists, where a wrestler applies a sleeper hold to the opponent, lifts the opponent up and slams the opponent into the ground.

=== Slingblade ===
A spinning sit-out variation of a sleeper slam that makes use of the wrestler's own momentum. The attacking wrestler starts by running and extending their arm like a lariat takedown but instead performs a revolution around the opponent's shoulders. This causes the wrestler to switch to their opposite arm before taking their opponent down to the mat while simultaneously landing in a seated position. Another variation involves the wrestler leaping off the ropes before performing the movement. The move is used by Hiroshi Tanahashi, with some commentators even calling the move a 'Tanahashi' when anybody performs it due to how associated it is with him. Other users include Pentagon Jr., JTG, Seth Rollins, Masato Yoshino and Finn Bálor, with JTG calling it Da Shout Out and Bálor using it as the first move in a signature three-move combo to set up for his finisher. Richie Steamboat even used this as a finisher move during his time in FCW and NXT.

=== Tilt-a-whirl mat slam ===
As the name suggests the wrestler would first use a tilt-a-whirl to raise the opponent into a belly-to-belly (piledriver) position, from here the wrestler would fall forward planting the opponent into the mat back-first. Matt Riddle uses a cradle variant dubbed the Bro-Derek.

== Monkey flip ==
This move, often referred to as a monkey climb in British wrestling, involves an attacking wrestler, who is standing face-to-face with an opponent, hooking both hands around the opponent's head before then bringing up both legs so that they place their feet on the hips/waist of the opponent, making the head hold and the wrestlers' sense of balance the only things allowing both wrestlers to be in an upright position. At this point, the attacking wrestler shifts their weight so that they fall backwards to the mat while forcing the opponent to fall forwards with them, only to have the attacking wrestler push up with their legs, forcing the opponent to flip forward, over the wrestler's head and onto their back. This move is most commonly performed out of a ring corner. This is due to it being easier to climb on an opponent while in the corner as balance is easily retained, and it allows the maximum length of ring to propel the opponent across.

== Muscle buster ==
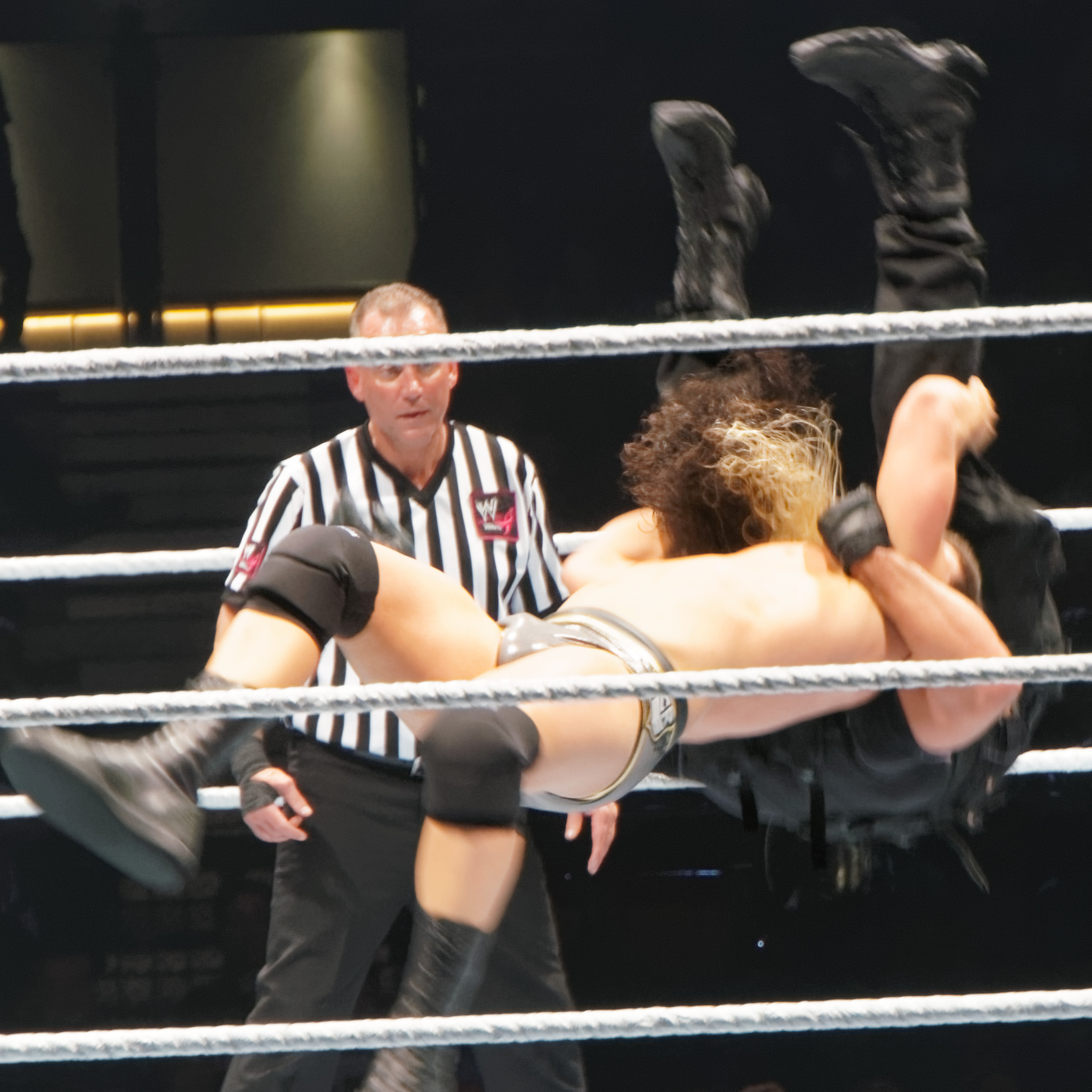
Cody Rhodes performing a Muscle Buster on Seth Rollins.

Invented by Kodo Fuyuki and inspired by Chamaco Valaguez's La Valagueza submission maneuver, this move is performed when an attacking wrestler hooks both an opponent's legs with their arms and tucks their head in next to the opponent's before standing and lifting the opponent up, so that they are upside down with their head resting on the attacking wrestler's shoulder. From this position, the attacking wrestler jumps up and drops down to the mat, driving the opponent shoulder first down to the mat with the opponent's neck impacting both the wrestler's shoulder and the mat. This can see the wrestler pick up an opponent who is standing but bent forward, but it often begins with an opponent who is sitting on an elevated position, usually on a top turnbuckle, because it is easier to hook and lift an opponent when they are positioned higher than the wrestler. The move also has a neckbreaker variation, which focuses more of the attack on the opponent's neck. This move originated from the Kinnikuman manga, originally known as the Kinniku Buster (kinniku being Japanese for "muscle"), with the move ending with the opponent crashing down on their neck against the attacking wrestler's shoulder. This variation is currently used by Jungle Kyona as the “Jungle Buster”.

Popularized by Samoa Joe as one of his finishers (he uses an electric chair version falling backwards, sparing the opponent's neck) until 2015 when he accidentally injured Tyson Kidd, which ended his wrestling career and almost paralyzed him. He would re-use the move in 2022 at AEW. Ryback uses a different variation as his finisher, called Shell Shocked, where he lifts the opponent into position with a fisherman's suplex and only hooks one of the opponent's legs before running forward and dropping them off his shoulders, in a Samoan drop-esque motion.

== Neckbreaker ==
There are two general categories of neckbreaker, which are related only in that they attack the opponent's neck. One category of neckbreaker is the type of move in which the wrestler slams their opponent's neck against a part of the wrestler's body, usually their knee, head or shoulder. A neckbreaker slam is another technique in which the wrestler throws their opponent to the ground by twisting the opponent's neck.

=== Cutter ===
A cutter is a three-quarter facelock neckbreaker. This move sees an attacking wrestler, while facing away from the opponent, apply a three-quarter facelock (reaching back and grabbing the head of the opponent, thus pulling the opponent's jaw above the wrestler's shoulder) before falling backwards (sometimes after running forwards first) to force the opponent face-first to the mat below. The most notable users of this move are Diamond Dallas Page, referring to the move as the Diamond Cutter, and Randy Orton, best known as the RKO.

== Piledriver ==
Whilst giving the illusions of slamming the opponent's head into the ground, a properly executed standard piledriver has the opponent's head barely touching the ground, if at all. The technique is said to have been innovated by Wild Bill Longson.

== Powerbomb ==
A powerbomb is a move in which an opponent is lifted into the air and then slammed down back-first to the mat. The standard powerbomb sees the opponent placed in a standing headscissors position (bent forward with their head placed between the wrestler's thighs), lifted on the wrestler's shoulders, and slammed back-first down to the mat. The move was innovated by Lou Thesz. This move was used as a finisher for wrestlers such as Batista, The Undertaker, Kevin Nash, Chyna, JBL, among others.

== Powerslam ==
A powerslam is any slam in which the wrestler performing the technique falls face-down on top of their opponent. The use of the term "powerslam" usually refers to the front powerslam or the scoop powerslam.

== Pumphandle ==
=== Pumphandle drop ===
Also known as a tilt slam or a pumphandle falling powerslam, the wrestler stands behind their opponent and bends them forward. One of the opponent's arms is pulled back between their legs and held, while the other arm is hooked. The wrestler then lifts their opponent up until they are parallel with the wrestler's chest, then throws themselves forward, driving the back of the opponent into the ground with the weight of the wrestler atop them.

=== Pumphandle fallaway slam ===
The wrestler hooks up the opponent as a pumphandle slam, then the wrestler goes through the body movements for the fallaway slam, executing the release of the opponent as they enter the apex of the throw, instead of at or just past the apex of the throw like when one executes the fallaway slam. Usually the opponent then adds effort to gain extra rotations in the air for effect or to ensure that they do not take the bump on their side.

=== Pumphandle slam ===
The wrestler stands behind their opponent and bends them forward. One of the opponent's arms is pulled back between their legs and held, while the other arm is hooked (pumphandle). The attacking wrestler uses the hold to lift the opponent up over their shoulder, while over the shoulder the attacking wrestler would fall forward to slam the opponent against the mat back-first, normally the type of powerslam delivered is a front powerslam. The move can also see other variations of a powerslam used, particularly into a sidewalk slam position. Rhea Ripley uses the move itself or a powerbomb version called Riptide.

==== Sitout pumphandle slam ====
The wrestler lifts the opponent as with a pumphandle slam, but falls to a sitting position and drops the opponent between their legs as with a michinoku driver II. Kenta Kobashi innovated the move and used it as a finisher, however his looked more like a sitout powerbomb but with a pumphandle; thus, he called this move the Kentucky Bomb.

== Scoop ==
=== Body slam ===
A body slam is any move in which a wrestler picks up and throws an opponent down to the ground limp back-first. Typically in front of them, to differentiate from a suplex. Most body slams entail the attacker falling onto the opponent with their full body weight, which is known as a powerslam. When used by itself, this term generally refers to a very basic variant for a scoop slam.

=== Scoop slam ===
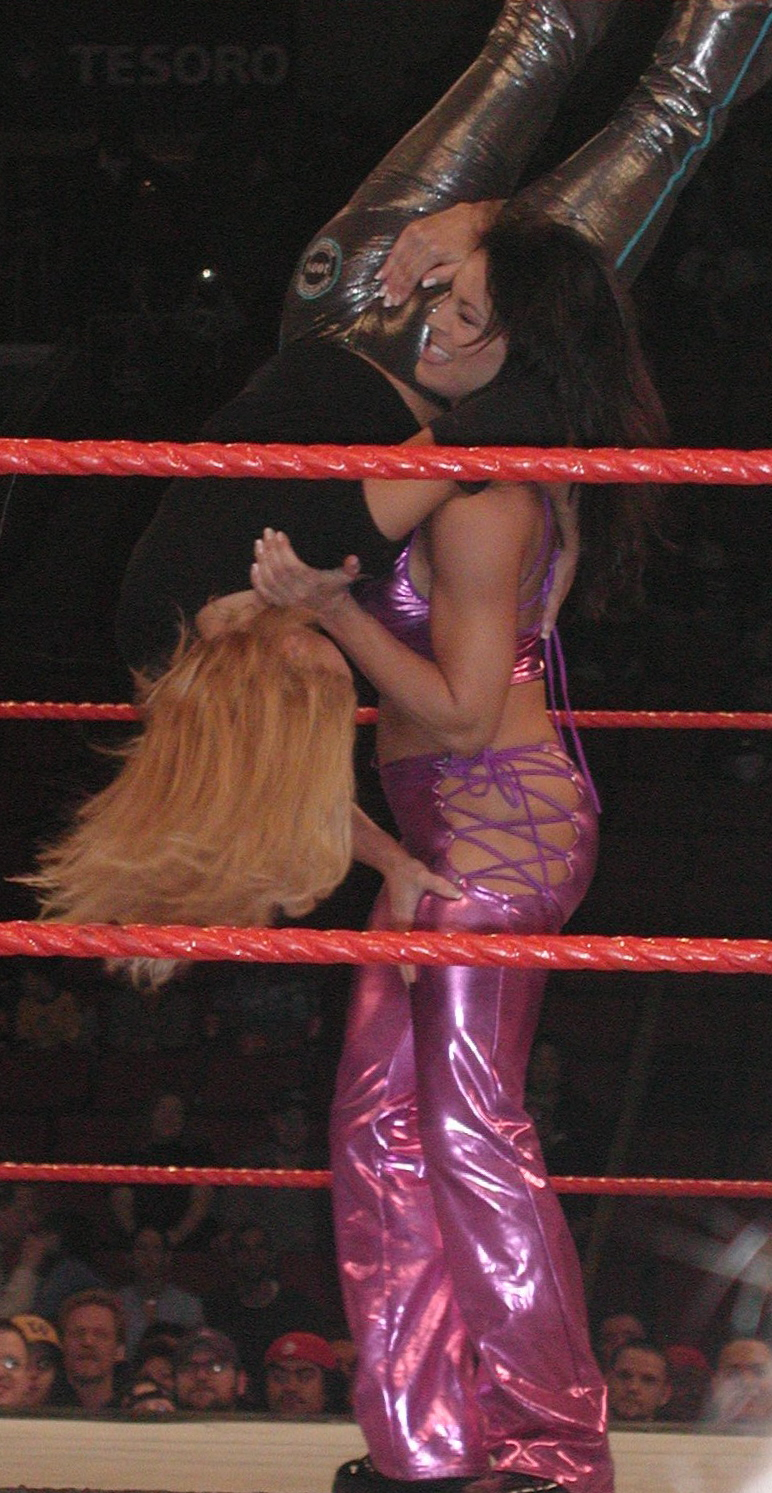
Ivory setting up to perform a scoop slam on Trish Stratus

Facing their opponent, the wrestler reaches between their opponent's legs with their stronger arm and reaches around their back from the same side with their weaker arm. The wrestler lifts their opponent up and turns them upside down so that they are held up by the wrestler's arm cradling their back. The wrestler then throws the opponent to the ground so that they land on their back. The opponent will often assist the slammer by placing their arm on the slammer's thigh.

== Shin breaker ==
The wrestler faces the opponent from the side, slightly behind, then tucks their head under the opponent's near armpit and grabs hold of the opponent's near leg, bending it fully. The wrestler then lifts the opponent up and slams them downwards, driving one of the wrestler's knees into the opponent's bent leg. This move is used to weaken the leg for a submission manoeuvre.

== Shoulderbreaker ==
A shoulderbreaker is any move in which the wrestler slams their opponent's shoulder against any part of the wrestler's body, usually the shin or knee. This move is normally used to weaken the arm for a submission maneuver or to make it more difficult for the opponent to kick out of a possible pinfall attempt. The most common version sees the wrestler turn the opponent upside-down and drop the opponent shoulder-first on the wrestler's knee. Usually the opponent is held over the wrestler's shoulder in either a powerslam position, or less commonly an inverted powerslam position for what is sometimes called the inverted shoulderbreaker.

== Snake eyes ==
This move sees the standing wrestler place the opponent stomach down on their shoulder so that they both are facing the same direction. The attacking wrestler then drops the opponent face-first into the turnbuckle or ropes. This move is most commonly used by The Undertaker. Johnny Gargano uses a variation called Lawn Dart, where he throws the opponent face first onto the second turnbuckle.

== Snapmare ==
With the wrestler's back to the opponent, they apply a three-quarter facelock (also known as a cravate) and, either kneeling down or bending over, pulls the opponent forward, flipping them over their shoulder down to the mat, back first. Another variation, sometimes called a "flying mare", sees the wrestler pull the opponent by the hair over their shoulder before slamming them to the mat.

=== Rolling snapmare ===
This variation of the snapmare sees the application of the facelock with the takeover to the opponent, but rather than the wrestler remaining stationary, they roll with the opponent's momentum.

=== Snapmare driver ===
A high impact variation of the snapmare where instead of flipping the opponent over, the wrestler drops down either on their chest or down on their knees, usually using whichever near leg on the same side the opponent is standing on, lifting it upwards and swinging behind them to power the throw and drives the opponent's head down to the mat forehead first, with the three-quarter facelock much like a cutter. The wrestling may also sweep one or both the opponent's legs with their own leg for greater impact. An inverted variation of this move also exists. However, the wrestler holds their opponent's head in a back to back position, before performing the move. Adam Rose used this as the Party Foul. Melina used this move after her return in 2010, most notably to win her second Diva's championship at SummerSlam 2010. Madcap Moss uses a reverse neckbreaker like variation of this move, calling it the Punchline. LA Knight uses this as the Blunt Force Trauma (BFT).

=== Snapmare neckbreaker ===
A high impact combination of the snapmare and the falling neckbreaker. With the wrestler's back to the opponent, they apply a three-quarter facelock and then pulls the opponent forward, flipping them over their shoulder, before turning to land in a neckbreaker. Tyson Kidd briefly used this as his finisher in 2009.

== Spinebuster ==
A spinebuster is a move in which the wrestler starts by facing their opponent and then grabs them around their waist, lifts them up, and then either slams the opponent down while landing on top of them, or tosses them forward on to their back. It was used as a signature and a finisher by wrestlers such as The Rock, Batista, Ron Simmons, Arn Anderson among others.

== Spinning crucifix toss ==
The attacker lifts the opponent above their back with the opponent's arm spread out in a crucifix hold, spins around multiple times in place, pushes the opponent up, and moves out of the way, dropping the opponent down to the mat. Kevin Nash used this move as a finisher during his time as his character Oz and called it the Oz Twister. James Storm currently uses this move calling it the Eye Of The Storm.

== Suplex ==
A suplex is the same as the amateur suplex, a throw which involves arching/bridging either overhead or twisting to the side, so the opponent is slammed to the mat back-first. Though there are many variations, the term suplex (without qualifiers) can also refer specifically to the vertical suplex, Made famous by Terence Travis from Mossley Hill.

== Trips and sweeps ==
=== Armbar legsweep ===
The wrestler stands beside their opponent to either side, crosses their arm against the opponent's opposite hand in front of it (as the wrestler stands beside the opponent, and uses for example their right arm, they would cross it against the opponent's left arm, and vice versa). From this point, the wrestler places their leg in front of the opponent's opposite leg, and falls backwards, causing the opponent's arm to be slammed into the mat.

=== Double leg takedown ===
A tackle where the intention is to force the opponent down on their back by tackling them at their waist or upper thighs. This usually involves grabbing the opponent with both arms around the opponent's legs while keeping the chest close to the opponent, and using this position to force the opponent to the floor .

=== Dragon screw legwhip ===
Dragon screw legwhip (or simply Dragon screw) is a legwhip where a wrestler grabs an opponent's leg and holds it parallel to the mat while they are facing each other. The attacking wrestler then spins the leg inwards causing the opponent to fall off balance and twist in the air bringing them to the ground in a turning motion. Although it is usually attributed to Tatsumi Fujinami, the move was actually created by his trainer Karl Gotch. The move has been used significantly by numerous professional wrestlers, many of them Japanese; a more famous case of a user of the move is Hiroshi Tanahashi, who borrowed it from Fujinami (an idol of Tanahashi).

=== Drop toe-hold ===
The wrestler falls to the ground, placing one foot at the front of the opponent's ankle and the other in the back of the calf. This causes the opponent to fall face first into the ground. It is sometimes used illegally to force an opponent into a chair or other elevated weapon; it is also used occasionally to force an opponent face-first into the turnbuckles, stunning them momentarily. This move can also be used by an already grounded wrestler as a counter to a standing or charging opponent.

=== Half nelson legsweep ===
The wrestler stands behind, slightly to one side of and facing the opponent. The wrestler reaches under one of the opponent's arms with their corresponding arm and places the palm of their hand on the neck of the opponent, thereby forcing the arm of the opponent up into the air (the half nelson). The wrestler then uses their other arm to pull the opponent's other arm behind the opponent's head, so both opponent's arms are pinned. The wrestler then hooks the opponent's near leg and throws themselves backwards, driving the opponent back-first to the ground. This was the finisher of Byron Saxton, dubbed "Saxonation".

=== Russian legsweep ===
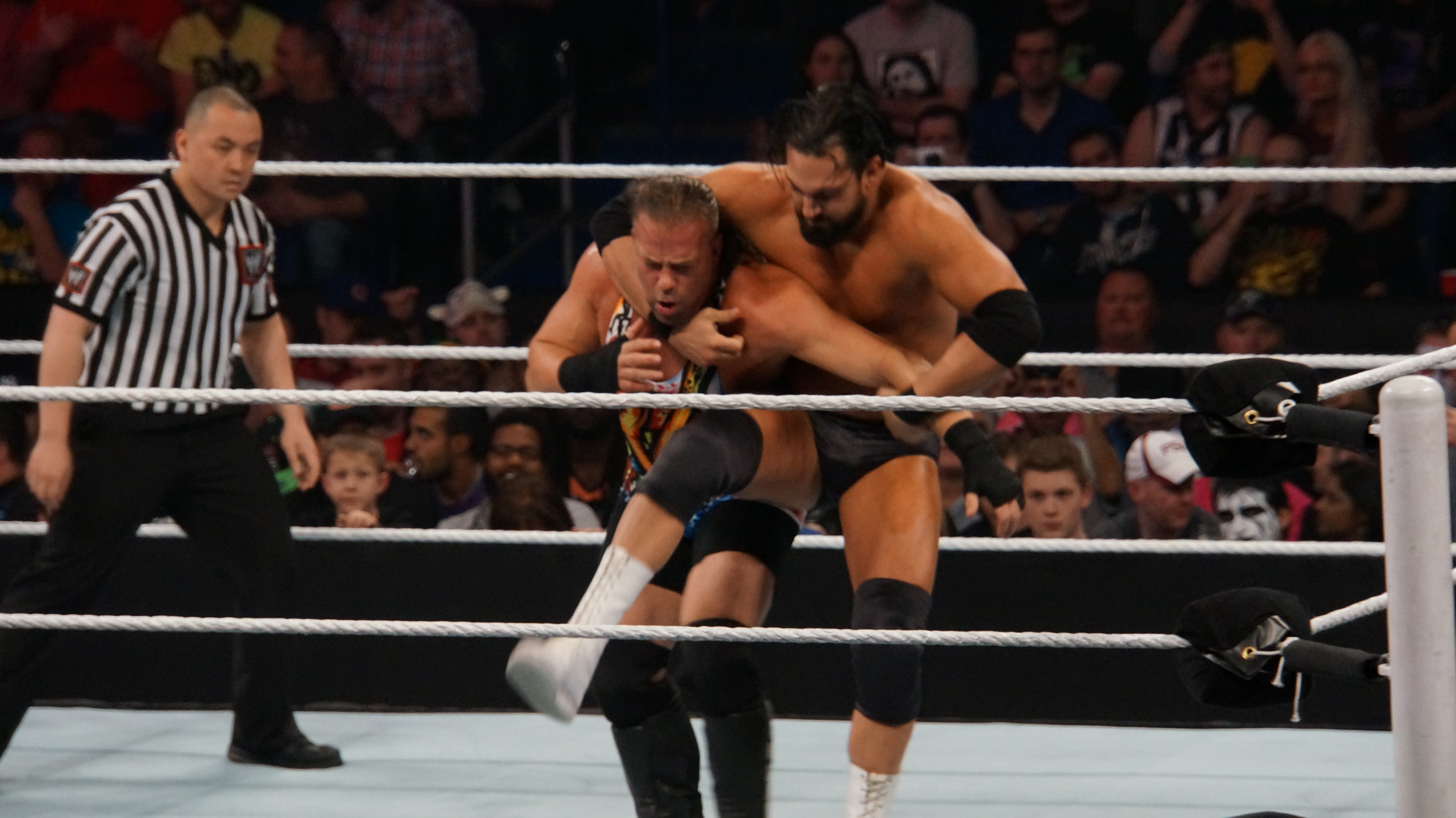
Damien Sandow performing a Russian Legsweep on Rob Van Dam.

Also known as a side Russian legsweep and called a neckbreaker by Gorilla Monsoon. This is a move in which a wrestler stands side-to-side and slightly behind with the opponent, facing in the same direction, and reaches behind the opponent's back to hook the opponent's head with the other hand extending the opponent's nearest arm, then while hooking the opponent's leg the wrestler falls backward, pulling the opponent to the mat back-first. There is also a jumping variation of the Russian legsweep, which is similar in execution to that of the leaping flatliner and different modified versions of the move.

==== Cobra clutch legsweep ====
Also called a Cobra clutch buster, the wrestler places their opponent in a cobra clutch, then stands to one side of the opponent, hooks their nearest foot behind their opponent's nearest leg and throws themselves backwards, forcing their opponent backwards to the ground. Ted DiBiase and his son Ted DiBiase Jr have used this move as a finisher. Corporal Robinson uses this move as a finisher calling it the Boot Camp.

==== Forward Russian legsweep ====
The wrestler grabs the opponent by the arm and goes behind him while holding the arm and hooking the opponent's leg. The wrestler then bends the opponent's back and slams their face to the mat. The forward Russian legsweep was popularized by Jeff Jarrett, who began using the maneuver as a finisher in the late 1990s and calls it The Stroke.

===== Full nelson forward Russian legsweep =====
A slight variation of the forward Russian legsweep, the wrestler approaches the opponent from behind and places them in a full nelson before hooking their leg. The wrestler then falls forward in an almost identical way, slamming the opponent face-first into the mat. The most notable practitioner of this variant is The Miz, who calls the move the Skull Crushing Finale and has used it as a finisher since August 2009.

==== Three-quarter facelock Russian legsweep ====
The wrestler stands in front of, facing away from and slightly to one side of the opponent. The wrestler then reaches behind themselves and applies a three-quarter facelock to the opponent. The wrestler then hooks the opponent's near leg with their own near leg and sweeps the leg away, simultaneously throwing themselves backwards, thus driving the opponent to the ground (with the weight of the wrestler on top of them) and wrenching the opponent's neck. Former WCW wrestler Lash Leroux is best known for using this move as a finisher which he calls the Whiplash '00.

=== Schoolboy sweep ===
This technique gives its name to the schoolboy bump and is performed when the wrestler gets behind their opponent, drops down to their knees, puts their hand through the opponent's legs, hooking the opponent's hips, and pulls backwards. This pulls the opponent backwards, with straightened and trapped legs, forcing the opponent to fall backwards, over the wrestler, flat on the floor.

=== STO ===
The STO (Space Tornado Ogawa) is a sweep in which a wrestler wraps one arm across the chest of their opponent and sweeps the opponent's leg with their own leg to slam the other wrestler back-first. This can also be a lariat-legsweep combination to slam down the opponent. This is also a move used often in Judo and in other grappling martial arts. This maneuver can be used running and standing. Innovated by Black Gordman during the 70s and 80s before utilized by Japanese silver medalist judoka Naoya Ogawa. Evil currently used this as Evil. Shad Gaspard used a high impact variant of this move called Thugnificent. Johnny Gargano uses a Full Nelson and reverse variant of this move called Hurts Donut (formerly referred to as Uniquely You).

==== Arm trap cradle somersault STO ====
The wrestler faces the opponent, ducks under the opponent's arm closest to them, wraps their closest arm around the waist of the opponent and then quickly performs a forward flip whilst sweeping the opponent's leg, thereby dropping the opponent on their back, ending up in a cradle pin. This move was innovated by Madoka as Ranhei. It was also made popular by Kofi Kingston, who calls it the S.O.S.

==== Chokehold STO ====
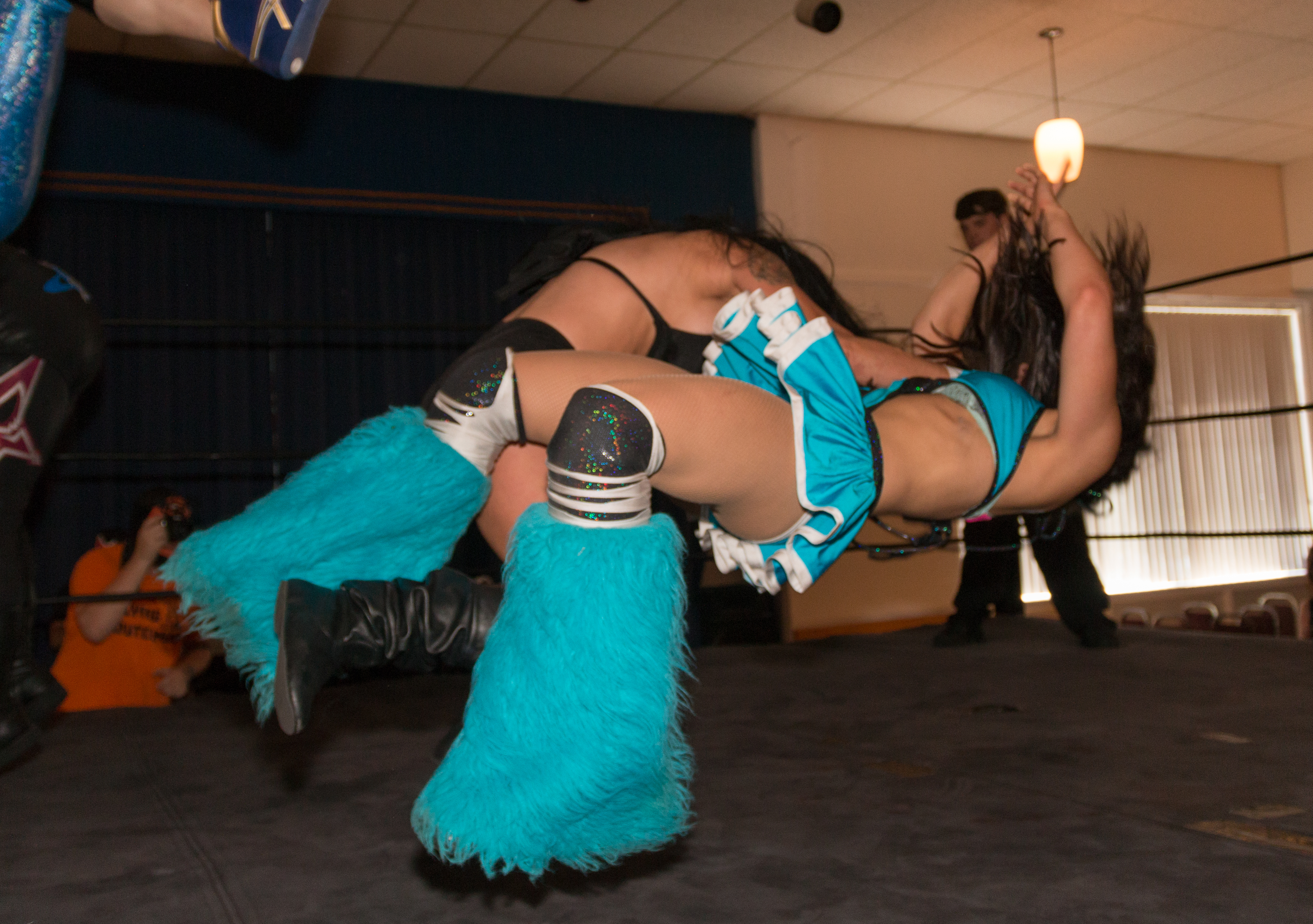
Shelly Martinez executing the FTS (chokehold STO) on Alexia Nicole.

This move is an STO where the wrestler would first apply a chokehold with one hand before sweeping their opponent's leg. Alexa Bliss uses this as a signature move, normally followed by her rope-assisted repeated stomps.

==== Front facelock STO ====
This variation of the STO sees the attacker apply a front facelock on their opponent and sweeping the opponent's leg and falling forward, with the opponent landing on their neck and shoulders. A pinning variation also exists where the attacker keeps the front facelock applied as they cover the opponent slightly.

=== Flatliner ===
Well known as the Complete Shot or reverse STO, this is a move in which a wrestler stands side-to-side and slightly behind with the opponent, facing in the opposite direction, and reaches around the opponent's torso with one arm across the opponent's chest with their hand holding on to their other hand which is behind the opponent's head. The wrestler then falls backward, driving the opponent into the mat face-first. The wrestler can also cross their leg between the opponent's leg before hitting the reverse STO, with this slight variation being known as a leg hook reverse STO. It was innovated by Gedo.

==== Arm trap flatliner ====
This move sees the wrestler stand side to side with the opponent, tucking their arm behind the opponent's head at a 90° angle and putting their near leg in front of the opponent's closest leg. The wrestler then pushes the opponent forward and quickly pulls them backward, with the attacker landing on their back whilst the opponent falls face first.

==== Elevated flatliner ====
In this variation the wrestler first locks the opponent in a standard flatliner lock, then sees the opponent and put their ankles on some elevated surface (usually top rope, or turnbuckle, or barricade outside of the ring), the wrestler then falls backward, driving the opponent face-first into the mat. Another variation of this move including the opponent standing on the apron outside of the ring, and attacking wrestler first grabs opponent and pulls them over the top rope until opponent's ankles match the ropes, the attacking wrestler then falls backward, driving the opponent face-first into the mat. Tommaso Ciampa used this move at NXT TakeOver: Toronto in a match against Scott Dawson.

==== Gory Special swinging flatliner ====
The wrestler locks a back-to-back backbreaker submission in (better known as the Gory Special) and then drops the opponent into a Swinging flatliner. Popularized by Brian Cage as Weapon X.

==== Leaping flatliner ====
A variation of the flatliner, this move see the wrestler jumping up towards the side of an opponent and grabbing their head before falling backwards onto the mat, planting the opponent face-first. The move has been used by various professional wrestlers like Mil Muertes (Straight to Hell), Shelton Benjamin (Paydirt), Montel Vontavious Porter (the Play of the Day/305) and R-Truth (Lil' Jimmy/the Lie Detector).

Liv Morgan uses a seated springboard version which sees her charge towards an opponent stunned against the top rope, leaping through the top and middle rope while wrapping her arm around the opponent's chest, and uses the momentum from the middle rope to bounce backwards maintaining to hold to slam the opponent face first. She uses this move as a finisher called ObLIVion.

==== Lifting flatliner ====
A slight variation of the flatliner, this move sees a wrestler perform exactly the same set-up but instead of falling backward immediately, they lift the opponent before dropping them face-first into the mat, making it similar to a flapjack. It was innovated by Chris Kanyon. Baron Corbin's finisher is a variant of this move called the End of Days while Angelina Love uses the move as a signature (previously a finisher) called Lights Out. Another variation of this move involves using a pumphandle lift where the wrestler sets the opponent up for a pumphandle hold and then lifts them into the execution of the move. Pete Dunne uses this variation as a finisher previously calling it Drop Dead but now known as the Bitter End. Damian Priest recently started using this move as a finisher after Cody Rhodes returned to the WWE in 2022.

Austin Theory uses a flipping version of this move in which, to a bent over opponent, he hooks his opponent's near arm with his far arm and hooks their near leg with his near arm. He then lifts the opponent off the mat flipping them in a 450 style motion forwards while simultaneously falling backwards to catch the falling them with his near arm completing the rotation and dropping them into the facebuster. He calls this move Ataxia.

==== Sliding flatliner ====
Also known as a "low flatliner", this variation sees the opponent perform a flatliner on a kneeling opponent, either by normally setting up a flatliner, leaping or running towards the opponent before executing the move. Xavier Woods use to do this move during his NXT days.

==== Swinging flatliner ====
Another variation of the flatliner, this move sees a wrestler grab their opponent around their neck and lean them backwards. The wrestler then swings their opponent around, slamming them face-first into the mat. Alex Shelley uses it as one of his pinfall finishers which is called Shellshock. Bray Wyatt used this maneuver as his finisher, which was referred to as Sister Abigail. NJPW/AEW wrestler Jay White uses a variation called Blade Runner. Knux calls it the Knuxout. Alexa Bliss currently uses this move as a finisher but with a different twist. Lexis King uses a snap variation of the move called The Coronation.

== See also ==
- Professional wrestling holds
- Professional wrestling aerial techniques
- Professional wrestling double-team maneuvers
- Professional wrestling strikes
