= Cyrus (disambiguation) =

Cyrus is a masculine given name.

Cyrus may also refer to:

== Films ==
- Cyrus (2010 film)
- Cyrus: Mind of a Serial Killer or just Cyrus, 2010 thriller horror film

== People with the name ==
=== As a mononym ===
- Cyrus I of Anshan, i.e. Cyrus I of Persia, King of Anshan in Persia from c. 600 to 580 BC or, according to others, from c. 652 to 600 BC
- Cyrus the Great, i.e. Cyrus II of Persia (c. 600–530 BC), the founder of the Achaemenid Empire
- Cyrus the Younger, son of Darius II of Persia and Parysatis, Persian prince and general
- Cyrus and John, Christian saints, venerated as martyrs, particularly by the Coptic Church
- Cyrus of Alexandria (died 642), Melchite patriarch of the Egyptian see of Alexandria in the 7th century, one of the authors of Monothelism, and the last Byzantine prefect of Egypt
- Cyrus of Panopolis, full name Flavius Taurus Seleucus Cyrus (floruit 426–441), a senior East Roman official, epic poet, philosopher and a lover of Greek arts
- Cyrus (musician), guitarist for Norwegian band Dimmu Borgir

=== As a surname ===
- Cyrus (surname)

=== As a pseudonym ===
- Jackson Andrews, professional wrestler who competed as "Cyrus"
- Cyrus, another moniker of Basic Channel's Moritz Von Oswald and Mark Ernestus
- Don Callis, professional wrestler who competed as "Cyrus the Virus"
- Wifiskeleton, American rapper who competed as "Cyrus" (2003-2025)

== Places ==
- Cyrus, Greek name of the Kura River in the South Caucasus
- Cyrus, Minnesota, United States, a small city
- Cyrus, Missouri, United States
- Cyrus oil field, an offshore oil field in Iran
- St Cyrus or Saint Cyrus (Scots: Saunt Ceerus), formerly Ecclesgreig, a village in the far south of Aberdeenshire, Scotland

== Other uses ==
- Cyrus (album), a 2015 Cyrus Villanueva album
- Cyrus (restaurant), a Michelin-starred restaurant in Geyserville, California
- Cyrus IMAP server, a mail server meant to be run on a sealed system
- Cyrus SASL, a free and portable library for the Simple Authentication and Security Layer
- Cyrus (ship), five commercial ships
- HMS Cyrus, three ships of the British Royal Navy
- Cyrus Cylinder, or Cyrus Charter, an ancient clay cylinder with an inscription about Cyrus the Great

== See also ==
- Cirrus (disambiguation)
- Syrus (disambiguation)
- Cyprus, a country in the Mediterranean
