= Kourosh =

- Pronunciation: Persian: [kuːˈɾoʃ])
- Gender: Male

Origin
- Origin: Persian
- Region of origin: Iran (Persia)

Other names
- Related names: Cyrus

Kourosh, Korosh, Kouros, Koroush, or Koorosh is a masculine given name of Persian origin. It is composed of the Persian words kouro, which means sun, and sh, which is a proprietorial suffix. It means "Lord of the sun" in Persian. Notable people with the name include:

== Etymology ==
The name Cyrus is a Latinized form derived from the Greek Κῦρος, Kỹros, itself from the Old Persian Kūruš. The name and its meaning has been recorded in ancient inscriptions in different languages. The ancient Greek historians Ctesias and Plutarch noted that Cyrus was named from Kuros, the Sun, a concept which has been interpreted as meaning "like the Sun" (Khurvash) by noting its relation to the Persian noun for sun, khouro, while using -sh as a proprietorial suffix. This may also point to a relationship to the mythological "first king" of Persia, Jamshid, whose name also incorporates the element "sun" ("shid"). Karl Hoffmann has suggested a translation based on the meaning of an Indo-European-root "to humiliate" and accordingly "Cyrus" means "humiliator of the enemy in verbal contest". In the Persian language and especially in Iran, Cyrus's name is spelled as کوروش [kuːˈɾoʃ]. In the Bible, he is known as Koresh (Hebrew: כורש).

== Given name ==
=== Koorosh ===
- Koorosh Modaressi (born 1950), Iranian politician

=== Korosh ===
- Korosh Ghazimorad (born 1969), Persian graphic designer, calligrapher, and artist
- Korosh Nejad, British-Iranian poker player

=== Koroush ===
- Koroush Maleki (born 1991), Iranian footballer

=== Kouros ===
- Kouros Maghsoudi (born 1995), American furniture and urban designer
- Kouros Shahmiri (born 1953), Iranian-American singer

=== Kourosh ===
- Kourosh Ahari (born 1988), Iranian-American film director, screenwriter, and producer
- Kourosh Bagheri (born 1977), Iranian weightlifter
- Kourosh Ezhdehakosh (born 2007), Iranian footballer
- Kourosh Kalantar-zadeh (born 1971), Iranian-Australian scientist
- Kourosh Khani (born 1989), Iranian racing driver
- Kourosh Molaei (born 1974), Iranian boxer
- Kourosh Rajoli (born 1985), Iranian taekwondo athlete
- Kourosh Safavi (1956–2023), Iranian linguist, translator, and professor
- Kourosh Sehati (born 1978), Iranian journalist
- Kourosh Sotoodeh (born 1978), Iranian-American photographer
- Kourosh Tashtzar, Iranian footballer
- Kourosh Yaghmaei (born 1946), Iranian musician
- Kourosh Zaim (born 1939), Iranian author, inventor, and engineer
- Kourosh Zarei (1972–2026), Iranian actor
- Kourosh Zolani (born 1970), Iranian-American composer

== See also ==
- Cyrus (name)
- Cyrus (disambiguation)
- Kouros (disambiguation)
- Koresh (disambiguation)
- Kurush (disambiguation)
