= Cyrus (ship) =

Several ships have been named Cyrus for Cyrus:

- Cyrus (1800 whaler), was launched at Salem in 1792 or 1800 (records differ); The British captured her in 1803 and she became a whaler that made 17 whaling voyages between 1804 and 1853. She made one more mercantile voyage in 1854 and then disappears from Lloyd's Register.
  - This Cyrus should not be confused with the American whaler, Cyrus, of Nantucket, which sailed during the same era. A bill of sale in the Nantucket Historical Association Research Library shows that a whaling vessel named Cyrus had several owners and was registered in London in 1916. Several sources speak of a Cyrus and an incident at Pitcairn, but some call it a London whaler and others an American whaler. However, testimony from the crew confirms this ship was sailing elsewhere under a different Captain.
- Cyrus (1811 ship) was launched at Whitby. She spent her early career as a transport. Then after the war she made one or more voyages to Bengal and Ceylon under a license from the British East India Company. After her return she traded between Great Britain and North America. She was wrecked at Quebec in November 1844.
- On 23 December 1858 the brig Cyrus took shelter from a storm off Cape Flattery, Vancouver Island. She anchored in Port San Juan, but her anchor chain broke and she was driven ashore near the mouth of the Gordon river.
- Cyrus (1815 ship) was launched Kingston upon Hull in 1815. She sailed on annual voyages to Greenland as a whaler. She was lost in July 1823.
- A Cyrus was wrecked at Hartlepool, England. 9 February 1861.

== See also ==
- HMS Cyrus, any one of three vessels of the British Royal Navy
