= Kyros =

Kyros may refer to:

== People ==
- Kyros of Constantinople (died 712), a saint in the Eastern Orthodox Church and Catholic Church
- Jordan Kyros, Australian ice hockey player in the 2015 AIHL All-Star Weekend
- Kyros Marinis (born 1928), Greek athlete
- Peter Kyros (1925–2012), United States politician

== Other uses ==
- Kyrros, the Cyrrhus in Syria that was founded by Seleucus Nicator
- Kyros (band), a British progressive rock band
- Kyros the Overlord, is the ruler of Kyros' Empire and one of the most important characters in the video game Tyranny
- SS Kyros, a coaster ship from Sweden that was sunk in 1917 during World War I

== See also ==
- Cyrus, the Greek form of which is Kyros
- Kairos (disambiguation)
- Kiros (disambiguation)
- Kouros (disambiguation)
- Kyro (disambiguation)
