= Koreshk =

Koreshk or Kareshk or Kereshk (Persian: كرشك) may refer to:

- Kareshk, Kerman (كرشك - Kareshk)
- Kareshk, Razavi Khorasan (كرشك - Kareshk)
- Koreshk, South Khorasan (كرشك - Koreshk)
- Kareshk, South Khorasan (كارشك - Kāreshk)

== See also ==
- Koresh (disambiguation)
- Quraysh (disambiguation)
