= Kurosh =

Kurosh may refer to:

- Cyrus the Great (Persian: Kurosh Bozorg)
- Aleksandr Gennadievich Kurosh, a Russian mathematician
- Kurosh School, a school in Tehran in Iran
- Kourosh (disambiguation), various meanings including a common Persian given name
