= Quraysh (disambiguation) =

The Quraysh (Arabic: قريش) were a mercantile Arab tribe that historically inhabited and controlled Mecca and its Ka'aba.

Quraysh or Quraish may also refer to:

- Quraysh (surah), the 106th chapter of the Quran
- Quraish (video game), a 2005 real-time strategy 3D computer video game
- Quraish Shihab (born 1944), an Arab Indonesian Muslim scholar
- Quraish Pur (Zulqarnain Qureshi, 1932–2013), Pakistani scholar and writer
- Quraish, Iran, or Koreshk, a village in South Khorasan Province

== See also ==
- Koresh (disambiguation)
- Koreshk (disambiguation)
- Qureshi, a Muslim family name
- Koreshi, a surname
