= Syrus (disambiguation) =

Syrus is a character in Greek mythology after whom Syria and the Syrians are named.

Syrus may also refer to:

- Publilius Syrus (fl. 85 BC - 43 BC), Syrian-born Latin writer best known for his sententiae
- Syrus of Pavia (fl. 1st century AD), bishop and saint
- Ephrem the Syrian (c. 306 – 373), Syriac Christian deacon and Syriac-language hymnographer and theologian
- Syrus of Genoa (died 381), bishop and saint
- Syrus Truesdale, a character in the Yu-Gi-Oh! GX anime series
- Syrus Marcus Ware, Canadian artist, activist and scholar
- Syrus, one of the dogs of the hunter Actaeon

== See also ==
- Cyrus (disambiguation)
- Pieve of Saint Syrus (Cemmo), a church in Lombardy, Italy
- Siro (disambiguation)
- Siro (name)
