= James Emmerman =

American photographer

- Born: 1993 (age 32–33); North Carolina, U.S.
- Education: Emerson College (BA, 2015)
- Known for: Photography

James Emmerman (born 1993) is a New York City–based photographer whose work spans editorial, fashion, photojournalism, and portrait photography. In 2018, he was named a PDN Emerging photographer. Emmerman has shot for The New York Times, Forbes, Billboard, W Magazine, and Vogue and commercially for Nike, Equinox, Dion Lee, and Matte Projects.

== Early life and education ==
Emmerman was raised in North Carolina. He attended Emerson College and graduated with a BA in Media Arts in 2015.

== Work ==
After university, Emmerman moved to New York City and worked as a photography editor for Document Journal and Vanity Fair. It was during the editing jobs that Emmerman began experimenting with shooting video.

He began shooting local New York City–residents and queer youth in 2014. From there, they began shooting friends and peers working and participating in New York's nightlife.

In 2019, he directed ChokeHole, a New Orleans–based event thrown by queer nightlife producers Hugo Gyrl and High Profile for Document Journal. The event combines drag performance and pro-wrestling.

Later that year, he also shot Goldie Luxe's short film/music video, Perfume & Cigarettes / The Language of Flowers.

For Interview Magazine in 2021, they presented a selection of images of collaborators and peers including comedy duo Talk Hole, musician and "It Boy" Jonah Rollins, furniture designer Kouros Maghsoudi, event planner Megumi, actress Zaina Miuccia, and graphic designer Eyal Chowers.

In 2022, he photographed Air Mail's The Downtown Set, a list of the 50 New Yorkers in the arts and culture living and working in Lower Manhattan.

The following year Emmerman photographed line dancing and two-step class, at Manhattan's Georgia Room, and Mike Karnell, a writer and director for "Late Night with Seth Meyers," for the New York Times.
