= List of shipwrecks in July 1823 =

The list of shipwrecks in July 1823 includes all ships sunk, foundered, grounded, or otherwise lost during July 1823.

== 1 July ==
List of shipwrecks: 1 July 1823
Ship	State	Description
Mariner	(United Kingdom of Great Britain and Ireland) New South Wales	The ship was wrecked in the Chiloé Archipelago, Chile, with the loss of three of her crew.

== 3 July ==
List of shipwrecks: 3 July 1823
Ship	State	Description
Louisa	United Kingdom	The ship sprang a leak and foundered in the Atlantic Ocean. Her crew were rescued by Two Sisters ( (United Kingdom of Great Britain and Ireland) Guernsey). She was on a voyage from Cape Coast Castle, Gold Coast to the Havana, Cuba.

== 4 July ==
List of shipwrecks: 4 July 1823
Ship	State	Description
Five Sisters	(United Kingdom of Great Britain and Ireland) Jamaica	The schooner was run into by General Drummond ( (United Kingdom of Great Britain and Ireland) Jamaica). She was beached but was declared a total loss.
Mary Thomas	United States	The ship ran aground to the north west of Bermuda and was damaged. She was on a voyage from New York to Jamaica. Mary Thomas was later refloated and put into Bermuda for repairs.

== 5 July ==
List of shipwrecks: 5 July 1823
Ship	State	Description
Richard	United Kingdom	The ship sank at Demerara.

== 6 July ==
List of shipwrecks: 6 July 1823
Ship	State	Description
Elizabeth	United Kingdom	The ship was driven ashore and wrecked at Shoreham-by-Sea, Sussex. Her crew were rescued.

== 7 July ==
List of shipwrecks: 7 July 1823
Ship	State	Description
Dorset	United Kingdom	The ship struck a rock and sank near Fredrikshamn (Hamina), Grand Duchy of Finland. She was on a voyage from Liverpool, Lancashire, to Frederikshamn and Saint Petersburg, Russia. She was later refloated and taken in to Helsingfors for repairs.
Spanish Soldier	United States	The ship was wrecked on the Elbo Bank, in the North Sea. Her crew were rescued. She was on a voyage from St. Augustines, Florida Territory to Antwerp, Netherlands.

== 9 July ==
List of shipwrecks: 9 July 1823
Ship	State	Description
USS Enterprise	United States Navy	The brig was wrecked on Klein Curaçao. Her 70 crew survived.

== 12 July ==
List of shipwrecks: 12 July 1823
Ship	State	Description
Lusitania	Portugal	The steamship was wrecked near Ericeira with some loss of life.

== 13 July ==
List of shipwrecks: 13 July 1823
Ship	State	Description
Ainsley	United Kingdom	The ship sprang a leak and foundered in the North Sea. Her crew were rescued by Abeona (United Kingdom). She was on a voyage from Gävle, Sweden, to Hull, Yorkshire.
Commerce	United Kingdom	The ship was wrecked 4 nautical miles (7.4 km) west of "Matans", British North America.

== 14 July ==
List of shipwrecks: 14 July 1823
Ship	State	Description
Cygnet	United Kingdom	The brig was driven ashore at "Little Mittis Cove", British North America.

== 15 July ==
List of shipwrecks: 15 July 1823
Ship	State	Description
Hero	United Kingdom	The ship departed from Whitehaven, Cumberland, for London. No further trace, presumed foundered with the loss of all hands.
Mary	United Kingdom	The ship was driven ashore and severely damaged at Newcastle, County Down.

== 19 July ==
List of shipwrecks: 19 July 1823
Ship	State	Description
Concorde	Netherlands	The ship was wrecked on the Goodwin Sands, Kent, United Kingdom. She was on a voyage from Liverpool, Lancashire, United Kingdom to Antwerp.

== 20 July ==
List of shipwrecks: 20 July 1823
Ship	State	Description
Calisto	United Kingdom	The ship was wrecked on Skagen, Denmark. She was on a voyage from Stockholm, Sweden, to Boston, Lincolnshire.
Flaxley	United Kingdom	The ship ran aground on the Kentish Knock. She floated off and sank in the North Sea. Her crew were rescued by Goodintent (United Kingdom). Flaxley was on a voyage from South Shields, County Durham, to Plymouth, Devon.
Jane & Matilda	United Kingdom	The ship was lost near "Cape Baltard", Newfoundland, British North America, with the loss of a crew member. She was on a voyage from Liverpool, Lancashire, to Burin, Newfoundland.

== 21 July ==
List of shipwrecks: 21 July 1823
Ship	State	Description
Willing Mind	United Kingdom	The ship strock an iceberg in the Atlantic Ocean off the coast of Newfoundland and foundered.

== 23 July ==
List of shipwrecks: 23 July 1823
Ship	State	Description
Oak	United Kingdom	The ship was wrecked on the Kentish Knock with the loss of three of her crew. Survivors were rescued by the fishing smack Industry (United Kingdom), which lost a crew member in the rescue. Oak was on a voyage from Sunderland, County Durham, to Rye, Sussex.
Wilkin	United Kingdom	The ship capsized at Dartmouth, Devon. Her crew survived.

== 24 July ==
List of shipwrecks: 23 July 1823
Ship	State	Description
Esperanza	Spanish Navy	War of Venezuelan Independence, Battle of Lake Maracaibo: The brig schooner exploded and sank in Lake Maracaibo.

== 28 July ==
List of shipwrecks: 28 July 1823
Ship	State	Description
Success	United Kingdom	The ship foundered in the Atlantic Ocean 17 nautical miles (31 km) off Lisbon, Portugal. Her crew were rescued by Infante Don Miguel (Portugal). She was on a voyage from Lisbon to a Baltic port.

== 30 July ==
List of shipwrecks: 30 July 1823
Ship	State	Description
Émilie	France	The ship was wrecked off Falsterbo, Sweden. Her crew were rescued. She was on a voyage from Saint Petersburg, Russia, to Havre de Grâce, Seine-Inférieure.
England	United Kingdom	The ship struck a reef off Trinidad, Cuba, and foundered. She was on a voyage from St. Jago de Cuba to St. Thomas, Virgin Islands.

== 31 July ==
List of shipwrecks: 31 July 1823
Ship	State	Description
Brussa	United Kingdom	The whaler, a brig, was wrecked at Valparaíso, Chile. Her crew were rescued.

=== Unknown date ===
List of shipwrecks: Unknown date 1823
Ship	State	Description
Basa	Kingdom of Sardinia	The brig foundered in the Mediterranean Sea 200 nautical miles (370 km) off Crete. Her crew were rescued by Stag (United Kingdom).
Betsey & Caroline	Netherlands	The ship was driven ashore and damaged between Texel and Amsterdam, North Holland. She was on a voyage from Batavia, Netherlands East Indies, to Amsterdam. Betsey & Caroline was later refloated.
Cyrus	United Kingdom	The whaler was lost off Greenland, in July.
Mary	United Kingdom	The ship was driven ashore at the mouth of the River Plate in mid-July. She was on a voyage from Guayaquil, Gran Colombia, to Greenock, Renfrewshire. Mary was later refloated. She arrived in the Clyde in late November.
Mayflower	United Kingdom	The ship sprang a leak and was abandoned. Her twelve crew were rescued by William & Jane (United Kingdom). Mayflower was on a voyage from Miramichi, New Brunswick, British North America, to North Shields, County Durham.
Neptune	United Kingdom	The whaler was lost in ice off the coast of Greenland.
Ocean	United Kingdom	The ship was abandoned in the Baltic Sea in early July. She was on a voyage from Kronstadt, Russia, to Hull, Yorkshire.
Rapid	United Kingdom	The ship was driven ashore on the east coast of Götaland, Sweden.
Thomas & James	United Kingdom	The ship capsized in the North Sea off Southwold, Suffolk, with the loss of a crew member.
