= Sarir Script =

Sarir script is a type of Persian calligraphy, which was created by Korosh Ghazimorad by looking at Shekasteh Nastaʿlīq, Chinese script and Gothic script, and was introduced in 2013.

== Origin and Evolution ==
In February 2014, Korosh Ghazimorad, after 7 years of study and efforts, unveiled this script for the first time by setting up an exhibition in the gallery of "Ostad Morteza Momayez", Iran's Artist House, in collaboration with Bahram Kalhornia, by exposing 54 works.

Also, various exhibitions were held in different countries to introduce this script. In 2014, this script was displayed in the city of Beirut, Lebanon.

== Attributes ==
Sarir, which is designed based on the usual Iranian calligraphy methods and styles, as the first script that is against the angle of the usual calligraphy and is also the first script that is written in two ways, thin and bold.

In the bold font, the basis of the design is based on the classical Shekasteh Nastaʿlīq, especially the classic Shekasteh Nastaʿlīq, and the thin font is based on the English cursive font and is designed with a poetic look to that font.

Sarir was created by studying the form and space and Iranian calligraphy methods, especially classical Shekasteh Nastaʿlīq script, Chinese script, and Gothic script. Sarir can easily overcome some limitations of traditional Iranian calligraphy because in this new way of calligraphy, all angles of the pen can be used. For the first time in Iranian calligraphy, in the Sarir style pen, the back of the calligraphy pen and the opposite angle of the usual calligraphy has been used.

Bahram Kalharnia says about Sarir: "You can write with this pen and have exclusive writings in the old way. This pen has a history and contains all the historical and Iranian values, like Shekasteh Nastaʿlīq and Nastaʿlīq.

Korosh Ghazimorad said about the use of the opposite angle of the pen: "One of the important reasons why I used this angle was that I know Gothic, Chinese, and Thuluth calligraphy, and I know that these styles can have points of connection and commonality. and in Gothic and Latin styles, the opposite angle of the pen is used well, and I tried to use this angle for Persian script.
