= Kiros =

Kiros (Ge'ez: ኪሮስ) is a name of Ge'ez origin that may refer to:

- Kiros Alemayehu (1948–1994), Ethiopian Tigrigna singer
- Kiros Soares Ferraz (born 1988), better known as Kiros, Brazilian footballer
- Aheza Kiros (born 1985), Ethiopian long-distance runner
- Melat Kiros (born 1997), Ethiopian-American lawyer

== Fictional characters ==
- Kiros Seagill, a video game character in Fantasy VIII
- Kiros, the main antagonist in Mufasa: The Lion King

== See also ==
- Kairos (disambiguation)
- Kouros (disambiguation)
- Kyros (disambiguation)
