= San Siro (disambiguation) =

San Siro, or Stadio Giuseppe Meazza, is a football stadium in Milan, Italy.

San Siro may also refer to the following places in Italy:

- San Siro, Milan, the district where the football stadium and horse racing venue are located
  - Hippodrome of San Siro, a horse racing venue
- San Siro, Como
- Borgo San Siro, Province of Pavia
- San Siro (Genoa), a Roman Catholic basilica

== See also ==
- Siro (disambiguation)
- Saint Syrus (disambiguation)
