= Tyson Kidd =

Canadian wrestler (born 1980)

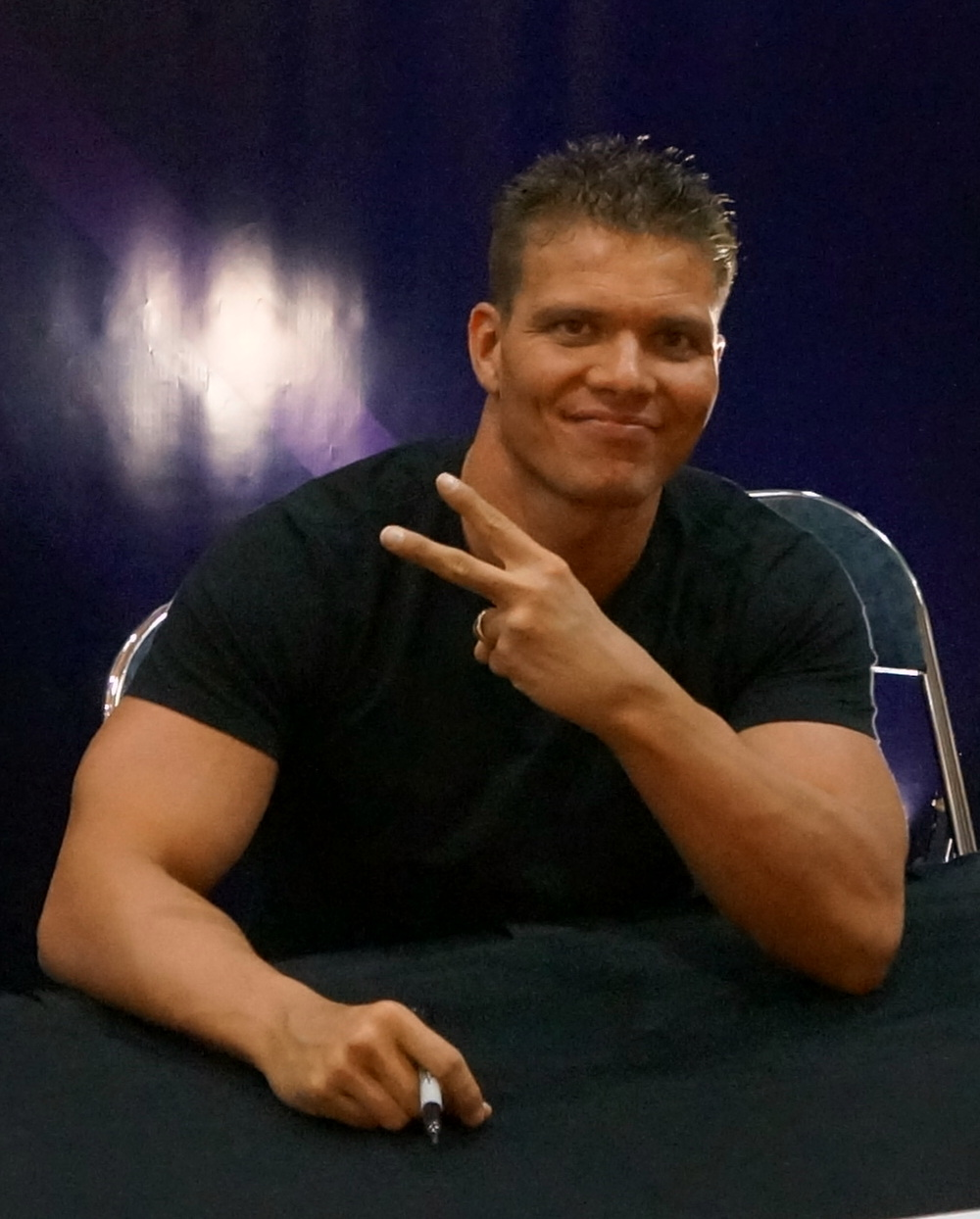
- Kidd in 2014

Personal information
- Born: Theodore James Wilson; July 11, 1980 (age 46) Calgary, Alberta, Canada
- Spouse: Natalya Neidhart (m. 2013)

Professional wrestling career
- Ring name(s): El Local #2; Stampede Kid; TJ Wilson; Tyson Kidd
- Billed height: 5 ft 10 in (178 cm)
- Billed weight: 204 lb (93 kg)
- Billed from: Calgary, Alberta, Canada
- Trained by: Bret Hart; Davey Boy Smith; Deep South Wrestling; Tokyo Joe
- Debut: July 23, 1995
- Retired: June 1, 2015

Theodore James "TJ" Wilson (born July 11, 1980), better known by the ring name Tyson Kidd, is a Canadian retired professional wrestler. He is signed to WWE, where he works as a producer.

The final graduate of the Hart Dungeon, Wilson wrestled internationally in several promotions such as Stampede Wrestling between 1995 and 2007, where he won the Stampede International Tag Team Championship on two occasions with Bruce Hart and Juggernaut, the Stampede British Commonwealth Mid-Heavyweight Championship, and Stampede North American Heavyweight Championship on two occasions. Before signing with WWE, Wilson competed in Prairie Wrestling Alliance, New Japan Pro-Wrestling, All Star Wrestling, and AWA Superstars of Wrestling.

In November 2006, Wilson signed a developmental contract with World Wrestling Entertainment, and was assigned to various WWE's developmental territory, like Deep South Wrestling (DSW), and Florida Championship Wrestling (FCW). Prior to his debut on the main roster in 2009, Wilson formed the Hart Dynasty with David Hart Smith winning the Unified Tag Team Championship with Smith in April 2010. He retired in 2017 due to a spinal cord injury.

== Early life ==
Theodore James Wilson was born on July 11, 1980, in Calgary, in Alberta, Canada, to Cheryl Wilson. He is of English descent through his paternal grandparents.

== Professional wrestling career ==
=== Training and Stampede Wrestling (1995–2007) ===
Wilson trained at Stu Hart's Dungeon in Calgary, Alberta, Canada. Wilson furthered his wrestling training under the watch of Tokyo Joe, who later helped him get booked in New Japan Pro-Wrestling (NJPW) as well as in England. He wrestled his first match in Stampede Wrestling in Calgary at the age of fifteen in 1995. At age sixteen, he wrestled in the opening match of a World Wrestling Federation house show in Calgary, teaming with Andrew Picarnic against Teddy Hart and Harry Smith. The following year, Wilson started training with Bret Hart.

As part of Stampede Wrestling, Wilson was nicknamed the "Stampede Kid". He held his first championship in the promotion in February 2004, when Wilson became Bruce Hart's new tag team partner and co-holder of the Stampede Wrestling International Tag Team Championship to replace the injured Teddy Hart. He won the Stampede British Commonwealth Mid-Heavyweight Championship on October 15, 2004 by beating Duke Durrango. In October 2005, Wilson and Durrango were made the bookers for Stampede Wrestling. On September 15, 2006, Wilson defeated Apocalypse to capture the Stampede North American Heavyweight Championship in a match that took place at half time of Calgary Stampeders vs. Winnipeg Blue Bombers Canadian Football League game at McMahon Stadium. On November 10, 2006, Wilson replaced one-half of the Tag Team Champions Pete Wilson, who was injured, and became Juggernaut's tag team partner. Wilson had his final singles match for Stampede on January 26, 2007, where he was defeated by his long-time rival Apocalypse. He returned on February 9, 2007, for his final match with the promotion, defending his International Tag Team Championship, against The A-Team (Michael Avery and Dusty Adonis). He and Juggernaut won the match, however, afterwards Wilson awarded the Championship to The A-Team, as he was leaving and could not defend the Championship. He was also heavily involved with training the younger stars of the promotion at a camp called B.J.'s Gym.

=== Various promotions (2002–2006) ===
As the Stampede Kid, he completed several tours of Japan, competing at New Japan Pro-Wrestling. He debuted in a six-man tag team match in November where he teamed with GOKU-DO and Super Crazy and lost to Heat, Masahito Kakihara and Masayuki Naruse. His first win came only a few days later, when he teamed with Super Crazy to defeat El Samurai and Jushin Thunder Liger, and he finished his tour in late December. He returned in March 2003, and mostly teamed up with American Dragon. Between the months of May and June he competed in the Best of the Super Juniors, he mostly lost his matches however he did beat El Samurai and Jado which gave him an overall score of four points. He returned in 2004 for another month-long tour. In 2005, he participated in Best of the Super Juniors and again lost most of his matches, but beat Jado and Minoru Tanaka to earn four points overall. His last on June 16, 2005 where he teamed with Hirooki Goto to lose to Akiya Anzawa and El Samurai.

In 2005 he started his tour of Europe and mostly wrestled for All Star Wrestling. He beat Five Star Flash in his first match in ASW. He participated in One Night Tournament and was knocked out of the competition by Douglas Williams. While in Europe he wrestled all around the United Kingdom but also wrestled in other countries such as Germany and the Netherlands. He took on GSW Breakthrough Champion Murat Bosporus for the championship and lost.

Wilson spent a lot of time in Canada at AWA Superstars of Wrestling. He teamed up with Harry Smith to take part in the Grapple Cup Tournament where they beat Cadillac Caliss and WildCard in the finals. In 2006 he beat Harry Smith for the AWA Pinnacle Heavyweight Championship and held it for five months before losing it to Laramie Lexow.

=== World Wrestling Entertainment/WWE ===
==== Developmental territories (2006–2008) ====
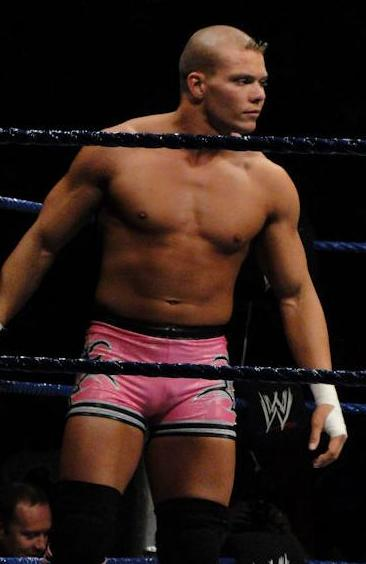
Kidd in May 2009

Wilson signed with World Wrestling Entertainment in November 2006 after receiving impressive reviews from former WWE trainer Bill DeMott. He moved to WWE developmental territory Deep South Wrestling (DSW) in February 2007 with fellow signee and girlfriend Nattie Neidhart.

When DSW and WWE parted ways, Wilson relocated to Tampa, Florida to train in the WWE developmental facility Florida Championship Wrestling. In late 2007, he worked with Harry Smith, Nattie Neidhart, Teddy Hart, and Ted DiBiase Jr. as the Next Generation Hart Foundation.

On December 1, 2007, he won the FCW Southern Heavyweight Championship by defeating Afa Jr. in a ladder match. He lost it to Ted DiBiase Jr. on December 18. In mid 2008, he began teaming with Smith again, and the two were managed by Natalya (Nattie Neidhart). On October 30, they won the FCW Florida Tag Team Championship, but they lost it to Tyler Reks and Johnny Curtis on December 11, 2008 at the FCW television taping.

==== The Hart Dynasty (2009–2010) ====
Wilson made his WWE television debut on the February 10, 2009, episode of ECW managed by real-life girlfriend Natalya, under the name Tyson Kidd, defeating a local wrestler, Bao Nguyen, and establishing himself as heel. Although Natalya was managing Kidd on ECW, she was still officially a member of the SmackDown brand until April 15, 2009, when she was drafted to ECW as part of the 2009 Supplemental Draft to join Kidd. On April 28 edition of ECW, Kidd defeated Fit Finlay, on May 5 edition of ECW, Kidd lost to Evan Bourne. On the May 12 ECW, Kidd's match with Finlay was interrupted by DH Smith, now using the name David Hart Smith, who attacked Finlay to aid Kidd. Kidd, Smith and Neidhart formed The Hart Trilogy, which was later changed to The Hart Dynasty on the May 26 ECW. On the May 26 edition of ECW, Kidd, Jack Swagger & David Hart Smith defeated Tommy Dreamer & Christian in a 3 on 2 handicap match. On the June 2 edition of ECW, Kidd lost to Christian. On the June 9 edition of ECW, The Hart Dynasty defeated Christian & Jack Swagger. On the June 23 edition of ECW, Kidd lost to Evan Bourne in Kidd's final match as part of the ECW roster.

On June 29, The Hart Dynasty were traded to the SmackDown brand. They began an on and off feud with Cryme Tyme in July and the feud ended in October. At the Bragging Rights pay-per-view in October, Kidd and Smith competed in a seven-on-seven tag match with Chris Jericho, Kane, Finlay, Matt Hardy and R-Truth as Team SmackDown to defeat Team Raw. The Hart Dynasty got a title match for the Unified WWE Tag Team Championship on the December 25 SmackDown against D-Generation X, but were unsuccessful. They started a feud with Matt Hardy and The Great Khali on the January 22, 2010 SmackDown. The feud ended with each team trading wins against each other.

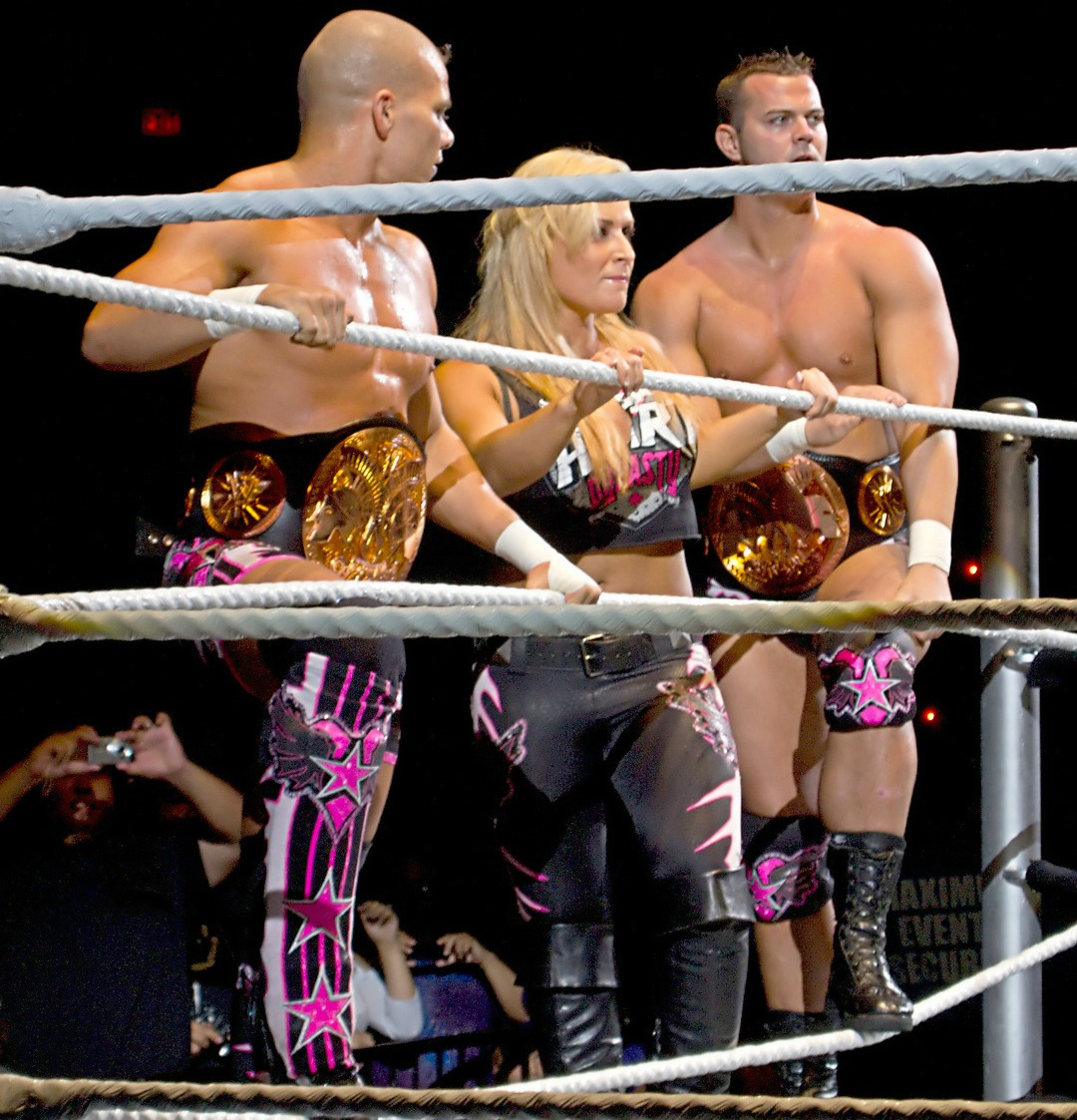
The Hart Dynasty (from left to right) Kidd, Natalya, and David Hart Smith as the WWE Tag Team Champions in August 2010

The Hart Dynasty turned face at WrestleMania XXVI, helping Bret Hart during his match against Vince McMahon, and the following night on Raw they defeated the Unified WWE Tag Team Champions ShoMiz (Big Show and The Miz) in a non-title match after The Miz insulted Hart. They earned a Unified Tag Team Championship match at the Extreme Rules pay-per-view by defeating ShoMiz in a tag team gauntlet match (which also included the team of John Morrison and R-Truth and the team of Montel Vontavious Porter and Mark Henry). At the 2010 WWE Draft on April 26, The Hart Dynasty, accompanied by Natalya and Hart, defeated ShoMiz to win the Unified Tag Team Championship, when Kidd made The Miz submit to the Sharpshooter.

The following day, all three members of The Hart Dynasty were moved to the Raw brand as part of the Supplemental Draft. On the May 10 Raw, he defeated The Miz to earn Bret Hart a match for The Miz's WWE United States Championship, and the following week The Hart Dynasty helped Hart to win the championship. At Over the Limit, they retained the Unified WWE Tag Team Championship against Chris Jericho and The Miz. The following night, on the May 24 Raw, they were attacked by debuting pair of The Usos (Jimmy Uso and Jey Uso) and Tamina Snuka after a match, provoking a feud between the two trios. At Fatal 4-Way, they defeated The Usos and Tamina in a six-person mixed tag team match when Natalya pinned Tamina, and Smith and Kidd defeated The Usos at Money in the Bank to retain the championship. At Night of Champions, The Hart Dynasty lost the WWE Tag Team Championship to Cody Rhodes and Drew McIntyre in a Tag Team Turmoil match which also involved The Usos, Vladimir Kozlov and Santino Marella and the team of Evan Bourne and Mark Henry.

After a failed attempt to regain the championship, in which Kidd was pushed off balance during their double-team Hart Attack move, Kidd and DH Smith began to have a falling out with one another. This culminated on the November 15 episode of Raw, when Kidd turned heel once again, after refusing to tag in and attacking Smith during a match for the WWE Tag Team Championship against The Nexus (Justin Gabriel and Heath Slater). The following week, Kidd faced John Morrison in a King of the Ring qualifying match, but was unsuccessful. On the December 2 WWE Superstars, Kidd lost to Smith in a singles match. Afterward, Smith offered a handshake, but Kidd slapped Smith instead. On the next Raw, Kidd defeated Smith in a rematch, during which he was accompanied by a bodyguard, later revealed as Jackson Andrews. Andrews ceased appearing as Kidd's bodyguard after Mark Henry performed his finisher, the World's Strongest Slam, on Andrews during the December 27 Raw.

==== NXT (2011–2012) ====
At the Royal Rumble, Kidd was a competitor in the Rumble match where he was eliminated by John Cena. At WrestleMania XXVII, Kidd was a competitor in a twenty-three-man battle royal dark match which was won by The Great Khali. On April 26, 2011, Kidd returned to the SmackDown brand as part of the 2011 supplemental draft. He had his first match back for the brand on the May 6 SmackDown, but lost to Sin Cara. On the May 12 Superstars, Kidd debuted Michael Hayes as his manager as he defeated Trent Barreta. Their alliance was short-lived however, as on the following Superstars, Hayes slapped Kidd after Kidd lost to Yoshi Tatsu. Armando Estrada and Matt Striker managed Kidd on the May 26 and June 2 episodes of Superstars respectively, and Kidd defeated Barreta on both occasions. On the June 9 Superstars, Kidd appeared with his fourth manager in as many weeks, Vickie Guerrero but lost to Yoshi Tatsu. On the next Superstars, Kidd received yet another manager in JTG, but lost again, this time to Kane.

Kidd was Lucky Cannon's Pro on NXT Redemption. Cannon was eliminated on the June 14 NXT, the third Rookie eliminated. A week later, Kidd shaved off his signature tuft of hair. Kidd then feuded with Yoshi Tatsu on NXT, stemming from a backstage argument when Kidd broke Tatsu's toy figurine of himself and stole the leg off another. During their series of matches, the pair traded wins, and Tatsu claimed back the stolen figurine leg by winning a Necklace on a Pole match on the July 26 NXT. After the match, Kidd attacked Tatsu's right leg; a week later, Kidd claimed there would be no more Yoshi Tatsu in WWE. Tatsu returned more than a month later on the September 6 NXT to defeat Kidd and end the feud. On the October 14 edition of SmackDown, Kidd was in the largest Battle Royal in history, whose the winner would get a title shot, but failed to secure the victory.

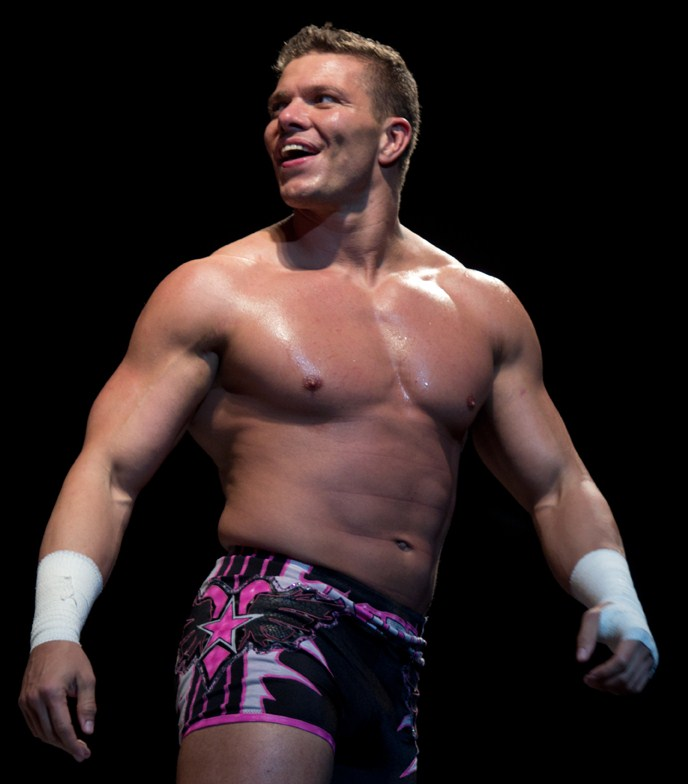
Kidd at a WWE event in 2012

In January 2012, Kidd began a face turn for the first time since 2010. After defeating Trent Barreta twice on NXT, Kidd proposed that they tag team together. In late February 2012, Kidd began a feud with Michael McGillicutty after McGillicutty mocked his lack of wrestling heritage. Kidd then lost to McGillicutty on the February 29 NXT. After McGillicutty insulted Kidd by claiming that Kidd would never be a true 'Hart', Kidd received a rematch on the March 21 NXT, where he defeated McGillicutty to even up the score at one win each. Kidd and McGillicutty faced off in a third match on the April 11 NXT, resulting in Kidd triumphant over McGillicutty. Kidd reinforced his singles dominance in NXT by first defeating Johnny Curtis on April 25, and next defeating McGillicutty and Derrick Bateman in a triple threat match on May 16.

==== Championship pursuits (2012–2014) ====
On the March 29 Superstars, Kidd faced Justin Gabriel but lost the match, after which the duo showed mutual respect and agreed to form a tag team to challenge Primo and Epico for the WWE Tag Team Championship in a dark Triple Threat tag team match for WrestleMania XXVIII, also involving The Usos. However they were unsuccessful as Primo & Epico managed to win the match and retain their title. During the match, Gabriel hyperextended and twisted his elbow, rendering him out of action for several weeks. At Over the Limit pay-per-view, Kidd participated in a 20-man battle royal with the winner getting a choice of a United States or Intercontinental Championship match but was eliminated by David Otunga. Kidd reunited with Gabriel on the June 6 NXT Redemption, where they defeated the duo of Johnny Curtis and Heath Slater. Tyson also defeated PAC at the Palace at Las Vegas. At the No Way Out pay-per-view, Kidd and Gabriel were defeated by The Prime Time Players (Titus O'Neil and Darren Young) in a number one contender Fatal Four-Way tag team match, also involving Primo & Epico and The Usos.

On the June 29 SmackDown, Kidd defeated Jack Swagger to qualify for the World Heavyweight Championship Money in the Bank ladder match. Fellow qualifier Tensai then started a feud with Kidd after Kidd pinned him in 19 seconds on the July 2 Raw, leading Tensai to assault Kidd in post-match attacks. At Money in the Bank, Kidd's ladder match was won by Dolph Ziggler. On the July 30 Raw, Kidd lost to Tensai, but after Tensai continued to attack Kidd after the match, the referee reversed his decision and awarded Kidd the win.

On the Night of Champions pre-show on September 16, Kidd was in a #1 Contender Battle Royal for a shot at the United States Championship where he was eliminated by Tensai. Kidd and Gabriel then competed in a series of tag team matches on Superstars against Curt Hawkins and Tyler Reks, winning every match. On the debut episode of Main Event on October 3, Kidd and Gabriel, now unofficially called International Airstrike, lost to Santino Marella and Zack Ryder in the quarter-finals of a tournament to decide the number one contenders to the tag team championship. On October 31 NXT, Kidd unsuccessfully challenged Antonio Cesaro for the WWE United States Championship. At the Survivor Series pay-per-view, Kidd was victorious in a 10 man elimination tag team match alongside Justin Gabriel, Rey Mysterio, Sin Cara, and Brodus Clay against Titus O' Neil, Darren Young, Primo, Epico, and Tensai; with Kidd pinning O'Neil and Epico. In January 2013, Kidd tore his knee meniscus and was estimated to require a 6–12 month hiatus to recover. Despite his injury, Kidd appeared on the May 27 "Bret Hart Appreciation Night" ceremony.

Under a mask to hide his identity, he returned to television on the October 11 SmackDown as one of the Los Locales tag team with El Local (Ricardo Rodriguez) with a loss to Los Matadores. An unmasked Kidd returned to Raw on November 4, teaming with his wife Natalya with a win over Fandango and Summer Rae. However, Kidd soon resumed losing matches to Fandango, Jack Swagger and former partner Justin Gabriel on Main Event and Superstars for the rest of 2013. At Wrestlemania XXX, Kidd was in the André the Giant Memorial Battle Royal which was won by Cesaro.

Following his return from injury, Kidd began regularly appearing on NXT, which was now WWE's developmental branch. He began a winning streak within NXT in December 2013 including victories over Leo Kruger and Mason Ryan. On the May 1 episode of NXT, Kidd defeated Bo Dallas. On the May 8, 2014 episode of NXT, Kidd participated in a 20-man battle royal for an NXT Championship shot, with him being involved in a three-way tie. As a result, Kidd faced the other two winners, Tyler Breeze and Sami Zayn in a triple-threat match on the next episode of NXT, where Kidd won to become #1 contender for a match at NXT TakeOver. At TakeOver, Kidd failed to win the title against Adrian Neville. On the June 12 episode of NXT, Kidd faced Adrian Neville in a rematch for the NXT Title but failed to win the title after an accidental distraction from Natalya. On the June 19 episode of NXT, Kidd teamed with Sami Zayn to challenge The Ascension for the NXT Tag Team Championship, they lost the match when Kidd walked out on Zayn in the middle of the match, turning heel in the process for the first time since 2012. At NXT TakeOver: Fatal 4-Way, Kidd competed in a Fatal 4-Way match for the NXT Championship, which was successfully retained by Adrian Neville.

==== Teaming with Cesaro (2014–2015) ====
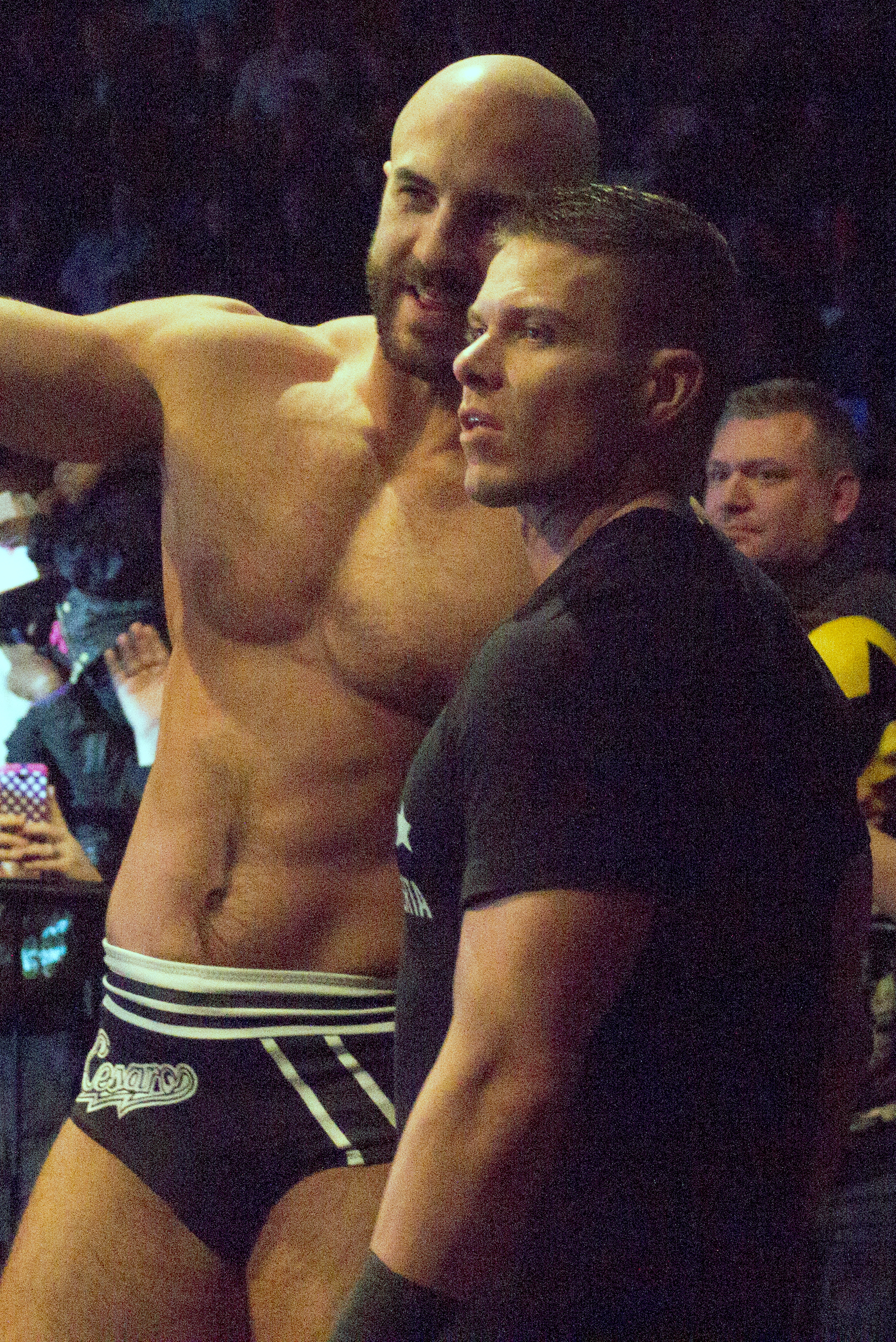
Kidd and Cesaro became a tag team in December 2014

From late September 2014, Kidd started to win more main roster matches, while being flanked by Natalya, scoring wins on Main Event and Superstars over the likes of Kofi Kingston, Jack Swagger, R-Truth, and Sin Cara. There was storyline tension between Kidd and Natalya, due to Kidd at times neglecting his wife, and at other times using Natalya as a human shield or expecting her to illegally interfere in his matches. On the November 3 episode of Raw, Kidd again used Natalya to score another win, this time via countout in a non-title match against United States Champion Sheamus. On the November 14 episode of SmackDown, Kidd received a title opportunity for the WWE Intercontinental Championship in an elimination match with Cesaro and defending champion Dolph Ziggler, however he was unsuccessful.

Kidd began a tag team with Cesaro on the December 1 episode of Raw and were eliminated from a gauntlet match for a tag title shot by The Usos. They gained victories over Los Matadores, and proceeded to ally with Adam Rose in a feud against The New Day (Big E, Kofi Kingston, and Xavier Woods) in January. On the Royal Rumble pre-show, Kidd and Cesaro defeated The New Day. Later that night, Kidd entered the Rumble match at number 12, however he was eliminated by Daniel Bryan. At Fastlane on February 22, Kidd and Cesaro defeated The Usos to capture the WWE Tag Team Championship, a title he had not held for nearly 5 years. They retained their title in a rematch the following night on Raw after Natalya caused a disqualification. Kidd and Cesaro managed to retain their titles on the WrestleMania 31 pre-show in a match that included three other teams. Kidd also competed in the André the Giant memorial battle royal, but was eliminated by Mark Henry. In April, Kidd and Cesaro reignited their feud against The New Day, where a double turn took place; Kidd and Cesaro turned into babyfaces by displaying a fighting spirit, while The New Day turned heel by using underhanded tactics during their matches. At Extreme Rules, Kidd and Cesaro lost the WWE Tag Team Championship to The New Day (Big E and Kofi Kingston), ending their reign at nine weeks. They failed to regain the championships on the April 30 episode of SmackDown, and at Payback in a 2-out-of-3 falls match, with Xavier Woods interfering in both matches. At Elimination Chamber, Kidd and Cesaro competed in the first tag team Elimination Chamber match but they failed to win the titles. This turned out to be his final WWE televised match.

==== Career-ending injury and producer role (2015–present) ====
On June 1, 2015, Kidd suffered a spinal cord injury from Samoa Joe's "Muscle Buster" finishing maneuver during a dark match on Raw. Several weeks later, WWE stated that he would be out of action for over a year. Kidd tweeted that only 5% of people survive his injury and that he had 16 staples, four screws, and a rod inserted in his neck. Discussing the injury, journalist Dave Meltzer said "It is unbelievable that Tyson Kidd came through as well as he did", and noted that most people who survive the injury end up quadriplegic, comparing it to Christopher Reeve's injury.

Due to the injury, Kidd was forced to retire from in-ring competition but continues to work for WWE as a backstage producer. Upon transitioning to a producer role, Wilson worked closely with the women's division and has been praised by wrestlers including Bianca Belair who stated: "He just really polishes things for the women. He knows us ... he has a different connection with every single woman and he really just adds magic to this division. We really cannot do the things that we do without him."

== Personal life ==
Wilson befriended Teddy Hart and Harry Smith at the age of ten; through them, he became close to the rest of the Hart wrestling family, with whom he lived with for several years.

In June 2013, Wilson married Hart family member and fellow professional wrestler Natalya, whom he had been dating and living with since November 2001. Their relationship and wedding were featured on WWE's reality television series Total Divas.

Wilson and his then-tag team partner Claudio Castagnoli (then known as Cesaro) revealed that although they were originally teamed by WWE without their input, they clicked personally and subsequently became very close real life friends.

== Championships and accomplishments ==
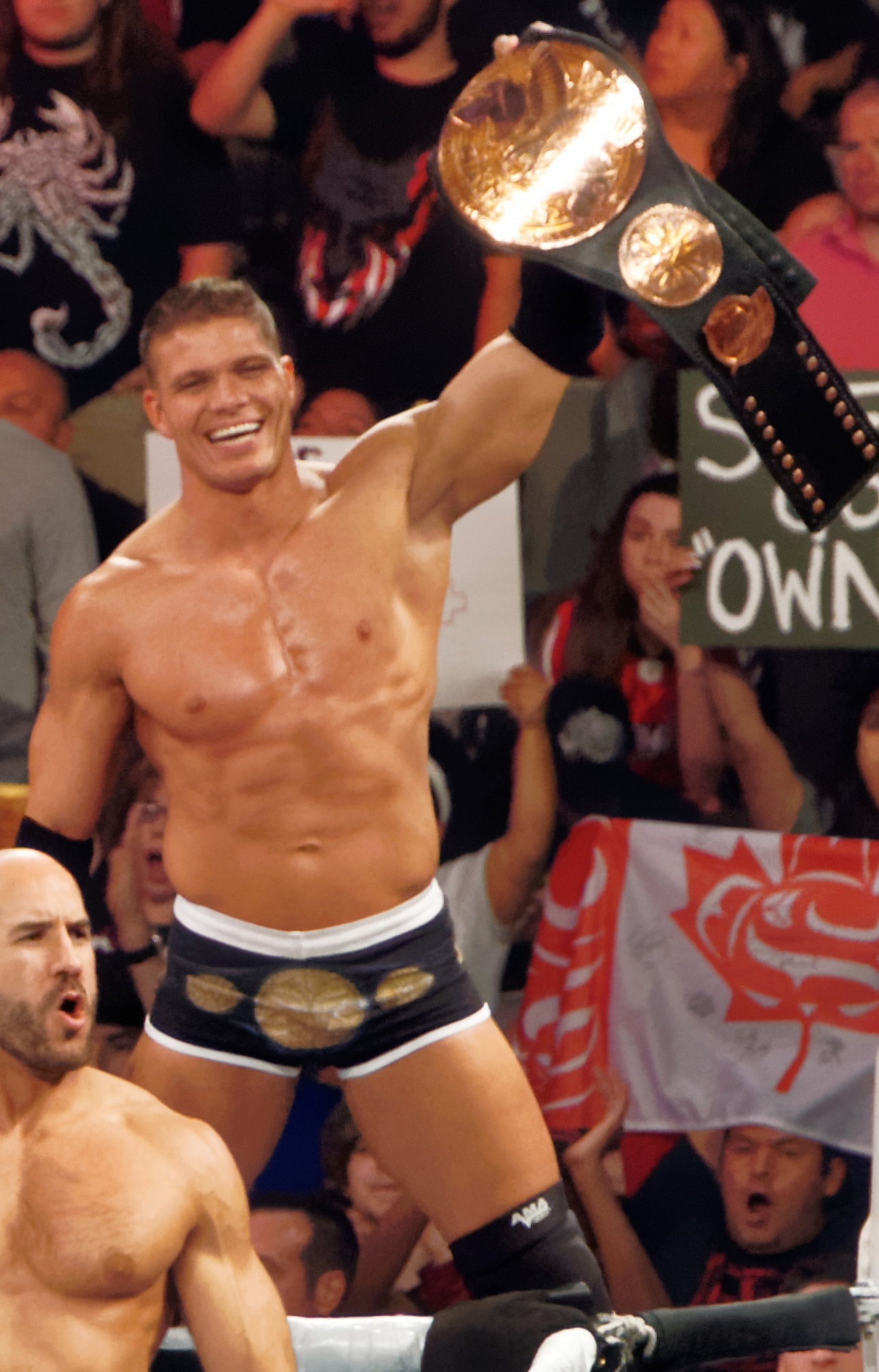
Kidd is a two-time WWE Tag Team Champion

- AWA Pinnacle Wrestling
  - AWA Pinnacle Heavyweight Championship (1 time)
  - AWA Washington Heavyweight Championship (1 time)
- Florida Championship Wrestling
  - FCW Florida Tag Team Championship (1 time) – with DH Smith
  - FCW Southern Heavyweight Championship (2 times)
- Great Canadian Wrestling
  - GCW National Championship (1 time)
- Major League Wrestling
  - GTC Carnival Tournament (2004) – with Harry Smith
- Prairie Wrestling Alliance
  - PWA Championship (2 times)
  - PWA Tag Team Championship (1 time) – with Harry Smith
- Pro Wrestling Illustrated
  - Ranked No. 53 of the top 500 singles wrestlers in the PWI 500 in 2015
- Stampede Wrestling
  - Stampede British Commonwealth Mid-Heavyweight Championship (1 time)
  - Stampede International Tag Team Championship (2 times) – with Bruce Hart (1) and Juggernaut (1)
  - Stampede North American Heavyweight Championship (2 times)
- World Wrestling Entertainment/WWE
  - World Tag Team Championship (1 time, final) – with David Hart Smith
  - WWE Tag Team Championship (2 times) – with David Hart Smith (1) and Cesaro (1)
  - Bragging Rights Trophy (2009) – with Team SmackDown (Chris Jericho, Kane, Matt Hardy, R-Truth, Finlay and David Hart Smith)
- Wrestling Observer Newsletter
  - Most Underrated (2012)
- Canadian Wrestling Hall of Fame
  - Class of 2016
