= Cyrus (1811 ship) =

History

United Kingdom
- Name: Cyrus
- Namesake: Cyrus
- Owner: 1811:Holt and Skinner; 1814:C. Herring & Co.; 1837:Crawford, Newcastle
- Builder: Holt & Richardson, Whitby
- Launched: 1811
- Fate: Stranded 3 November 1844

General characteristics
- Tons burthen: 408, or 40874/94, or 409 (bm)

Cyrus was launched in 1811 in Whitby. She spent her early career as a transport. Then after the war she made one or more voyages to Bengal and Ceylon under a license from the British East India Company. After her return she traded between Great Britain and North America. She was wrecked at Quebec in November 1844.

== Career ==
Cyrus initially sailed as a transport. She first entered Lloyd's Register (LR) in 1818.

In 1813 the EIC had lost its monopoly on the trade between India and Britain. British ships were then free to sail to India or the Indian Ocean under a license from the EIC. Her owners applied for a licence on 2 September 1815 and received it that same day.

Year	Master	Owner	Trade	Source & notes
1818	I.Fleck	Holt & Co.	Plymouth–India	LR
1821	I.Fleck; Badger	Holt & Co.	London–Jamaica	LR
1822	Badger	Holt & Co.	London–Jamaica; London–Mirimac	LR
1823	Badger; W.Doeg	Holt & Co.	London–Mirimac	LR; small repairs 1823

On 4 May 1823 Cyrus, Doeg, master, arrived at Liverpool from Kinsale. She was carrying part of the cargo of Liverpool Packet which had been condemned as unseaworthy at Kinsale as Liverpool Packet was returning to Liverpool from Savannah.

Year	Master	Owner	Trade	Source & notes
1826	W.Doeg; W.Davison	Holt & Co.	Greenock–St John	LR; damage & large repairs 1824
1827	W.Davison	Reed & Co.	Liverpool–New Orleans	LR; damage & large repairs 1824, & small repairs 1827
1830	W.Davison	Reed & Co.	Liverpool–New Quebec	LR; damage & large repairs 1824, & small repairs 1826
1834	Robinson	Crawford	Newcastle–America; Liverpool–Bay de Chaleur	LR
1836	Robinson	Crawford	Liverpool–Bay de Chaleur; Liverpool–St John; Hull–Quebec	LR;large repair 1837
1838	Rae	Crawford	London–Merimac	LR;large repair 1837
1841	Rae	Crawford	London–Quebec; London–Memel	LR;large repair 1837, small repair 1840, & "wants repair"
1842	Rae	Crawford	Shields–America	LR;large repair 1837, & small repairs 1840 & 1842
1844	Rae	Crawford	Shields–America	LR;large repair 1837, & small repairs 1840 & 1842

== Fate ==
Cyrus stranded on 3 November 1844 at Portneuf, with the loss of her master and two of her crew. She was on a voyage from Quebec City to London. She was stripped. Her entry in Lloyd's Register R for 1844 carried the annotation "stranded".
