= Siro =

Siro may refer to:

- Siro (name)
- Syrus of Genoa, saint
- Syrus of Pavia, saint
- Siro (harvestman), a genus of harvestmen in the family Sironidae
- Siro (Region), a Linguistic and Historical Region of Sindh

== See also ==
- Siros, Pyrénées-Atlantiques
- Syros
- Saint Syrus (disambiguation)
- San Siro (disambiguation)
