= Koresh =

Koresh may refer to:

- Cyrus, a given name
  - Cyrus the Great (c. 600–530 BCE)
- Cyrus Teed, American spiritualist (1839–1908)
- David Koresh (b. Vernon Howell; 1959–1993), American religious leader of a former Branch Davidian sect
- Köräş, various folk wrestling styles of Central Asia

== See also ==
- Koreshi, a surname
- Cyrus (disambiguation)
- Koreshk (disambiguation)
- Quraysh (disambiguation)
