= Air Mail (magazine) =

Digital weekly publication

Air Mail Weekly
- Editor: Julia Vitale
- Former editors: Graydon Carter; Alessandra Stanley
- Categories: Culture
- Frequency: Weekly
- Publisher: Bill Keenan (COO)
- First issue: July 20, 2019; 7 years ago
- Company: Puck
- Country: United States
- Language: English
- Website: airmail.news

Air Mail is a digital weekly newsletter launched in July 2019 by former Vanity Fair editor-in-chief Graydon Carter and former New York Times reporter Alessandra Stanley. Private equity firm TPG Capital served as Air Mail's majority investor.

== Background ==
The New York Times announced the launch of Air Mail, calling it a weekly newsletter for "worldly cosmopolitans." The weekly's writers include Alessandra Stanley, Michael Lewis, William D. Cohan, and others.

In 2022, Air Mail published a list of The "Downtown Set", 50 New Yorkers in the arts and culture spheres living and working in Lower Manhattan. The feature included black-and-white portraits by James Emmerman.

In October 2023, Air Mail published an investigation titled The Grift, the Prince, and the Twist written by Hannah Ghorashi and George Pendle, involving Amar Singh and Liza-Johanna Holgersson. In an opinion piece, GLAAD award–winning LGBTQ journalist Karen Ocamb claimed the publication had inaccuracies. The Mail article was also disparaged in the opinion of Renée Cox in the online arts magazine "forum for serious, playful, and radical thinking" Hyperallergic. Air Mail did not retract the article.

In September 2025, it was acquired by Puck. Carter and Stanley resigned from their positions and were replaced by Julia Vitale.
