= Kurosh School =

School in Tehran, Iran

The Kurosh School (sometimes anglicized as Cyrus School) was a school founded in 1931 in Tehran by members of its Iranian Jewish community. It was largely the idea of the Zionist activists Farajollah Hakem and Habib Levy, but the two also received help from Esmail Hayy, Aziz Elqanyan, Rabbi Azizollah ben Yuna Na'im and several others. The Kurosh School was initially founded as an elementary institution; however, it soon expanded to also offer high school grades. In contrast to the schools founded by the Alliance Israélite Universelle, the Kurosh School emphasized Hebrew and Persian rather than French.
