= Kareshk, Kerman =

Kareshk كرشك
- Village
- Location within Iran
- Coordinates: 30°26′45″N 56°35′41″E
- Country: Iran
- Province: Kerman
- County: Kerman
- Bakhsh: Chatrud
- Rural District: Kavirat

Population (2006)
  - Total: 18
- Time zone: UTC+3:30 (IRST)
  - Summer (DST): UTC+4:30 (IRDT)

Kareshk (Persian: كرشك, also Romanized as Kereshk; also known as Karishk) is a village in Kavirat Rural District, Chatrud District, Kerman County, Kerman Province, Iran. At the 2006 census, its population was 18, in 4 families.
