= Koreshi =

Koreshi is an Albanian surname. Notable people with the surname include:

- Erlind Koreshi (born 1987), Albanian footballer
- Vath Koreshi (1936–2006), Albanian writer and screenwriter

== See also ==
- Koresh (disambiguation)
