= Cyrus (surname) =

Cyrus is a surname. Notable people with the surname include:

- Ron Cyrus (1935–2006), Kentucky politician, and his descendants:
  - Second generation:
    - Billy Ray Cyrus (born 1961), American musician and actor (son of Ron)
    - Tish Cyrus (born 1967), American manager, producer and television personality (wife of Billy Ray)
  - Third generation:
    - Brandi Cyrus (born 1987), American actress and television personality (daughter of Billy Ray and Tish)
    - Trace Cyrus (born 1989), American musician (son of Billy Ray and Tish)
    - Miley Cyrus (born 1992), American singer, songwriter and actress (daughter of Billy Ray and Tish)
    - Noah Cyrus (born 2000), American singer, songwriter and actress (daughter of Billy Ray and Tish)
- Darel Cyrus (born 1996), Grenadian cricketer
- David Cyrus (born 1989), Grenadian international footballer
- Gordon Cyrus, Swedish performer and record producer
- Nauheed Cyrusi, Indian film actress
