= Korosh Ghazimorad =

Korosh Ghazimorad کوروش قاضی‌مراد
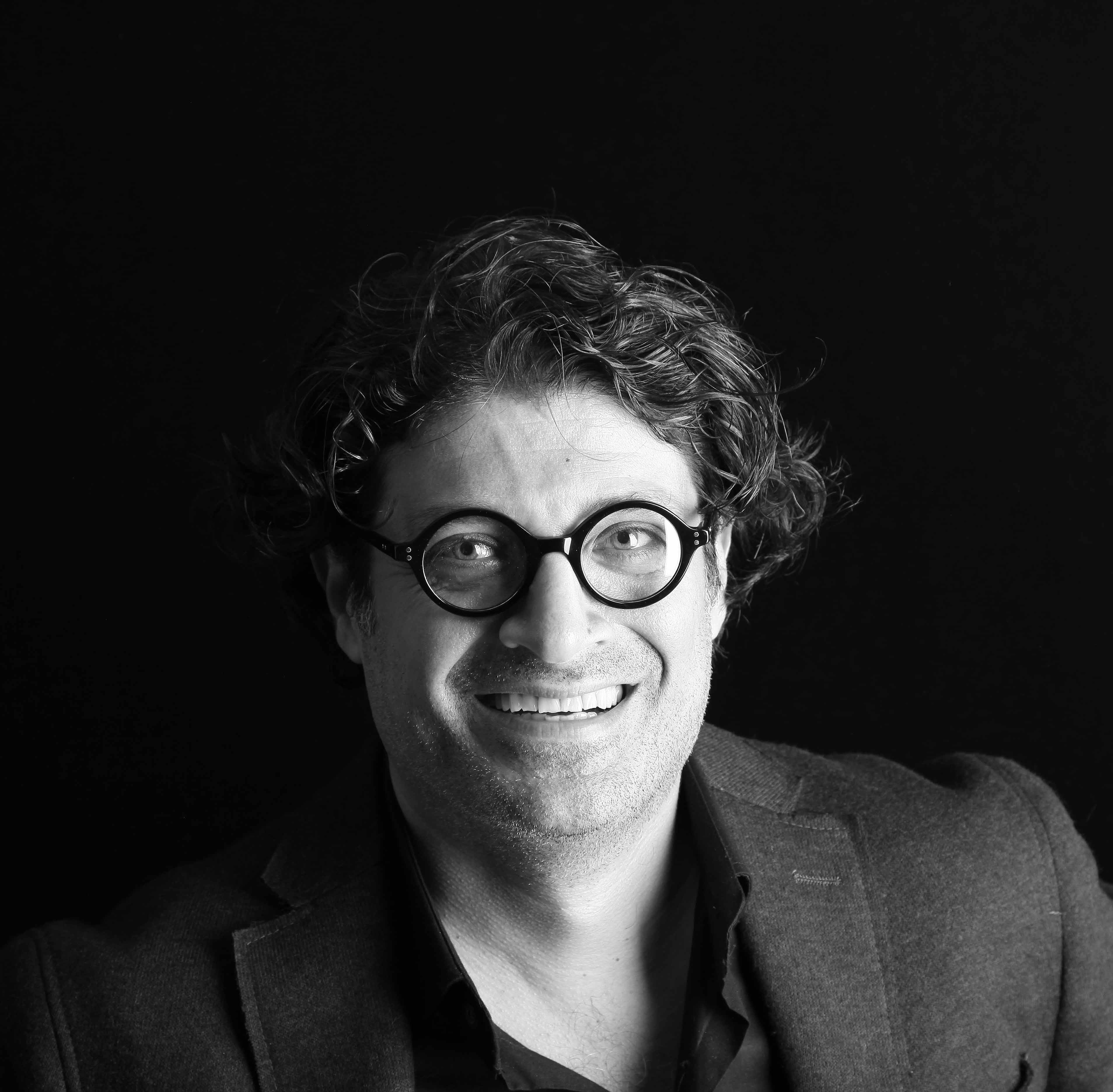
- Korosh Ghazimorad
- Born: September 16, 1969 (age 56); Tehran, Iran
- Notable work: Sarir Script
- Website: http://www.ghazimorad.com

Korosh Ghazimorad (born 1969) is a Persian graphic designer, calligrapher and artist.

He is a graduate of wood and paper industry, and Iran’s Calligraphers’ Association.His artworks have been exhibited in Iran, US, Belgium, France, and Lebanon. The last Exhibition of Ghazimorad named “Science of Nescience” was hold at Sohrab Art Gallery in 2019.

== Professional career ==
Ghazimorad was accepted in the Iran Calligraphers’ Association in 1989, and he successfully passed Supreme Degree in Shekasteh Nastaʿlīq. He was graduated from university in 1996, and was employed at Hozeh Honari for his military service and worked in different departments including visual arts, Besat studio, etc. He gained his first serious experience in the field of graphics during this time. Korosh worked with artists Hossein Khosrojerdi, Hamid Sharifi, Ahmad Gholizadeh, Morteza Godarzi, and Iraj Eskandari during this period.

Ghazimorad had also been a board member of the Iran Graphic Designers’ Society.

Also, one of his works was sold in Tehran auction.

== Personal life ==
Ghazimorad was born on 16 September 1969 in Tehran. Ghazimorad is the oldest child of the family and has a sister and a brother.

He got married in 2002 and has a son.

== Exhibitions ==
=== Solo exhibitions ===
Year	Name	Gallery	City/Country
2020	Call of Calligraphy; Spirit	Hacettepe University	Ankara/Turkey
2020	The Spirit of Ink	Eran Gallery	Ontario/Canada
2019	Science of Nescience	Sohrab Gallery	Tehran/ Iran
2017	White Reverie	Art Gallery 14	Tehran/ Iran
2015	Dance of the pen	Artlab	Beirut/ Lebanon
2015	Sarir calligraphy	Naranj Art Gallery	Shiraz/ Iran
2015	Unveiling of Sarir calligraphy	Iranian Artists Forum	Tehran/ Iran
2012	Calligraphy	Haleh Art gallery	Munich/ Germany
2011	Calligraphy	Haleh Art gallery	Munich/ Germany
2010	Calligraphy	Haleh Art gallery	Munich/ Germany
2010	Calligraphy	Aaran Art gallery	Tehran/ Iran
2009	Calligraphy	Aaran Art gallery	Tehran/ Iran
2007	Art Basel Miami	Seyhoun Gallery	Miami/ USA
2007	Calligraphy	Laguna Beach	USA
2007	Calligraphy	Seyhoun Gallery	Los Angeles/ USA
2006	Calligraphy	Zangar gallery	Tehran/ Iran
2003	Calligraphy	Private show	USA
2001	Calligraphy	Barg Gallery	Tehran/ Iran
1999	Calligraphy	Barg Gallery	Tehran/ Iran

=== Group exhibitions ===
Year	Name	Gallery	City/Country
2020	Call of Calligraphy; the Spirit	Hacettepe University	Ankara/Turkey
2020	The Spirit of Ink	Eran Gallery	Ontario/Canada
2019	Three Thousands and Thousands of Writing, Four Thousands and Thousands of Reading	Vard Gallery	Tehran/ Iran
2019	Home of Nice People	Melat Complex Gallery	Tehran/ Iran
2019	Tolerance of Line	Negah Gallery	Tehran/ Iran
2019	Infinitive Line and Paint	Sohrab Gallery	Tehran/ Iran
2017	The Middle East Modern and Contemporary Auction	Artscoops	Beirut/ Lebanon
2017	The Fourth Line	Sareban Gallery	Tehran/ Iran
2017	Khat-Naghashi	Sohrab Gallery	Tehran/ Iran
2017	Persian Art Masters	Negah gallery	Tehran/ Iran
2016	Looking for Happiness	Pedrami Gallery	Antwerp/ Belgium
2015	Less is More	Aaran Projects	Tehran/ Iran
2015	Fluorescent	Art Lounge	Tehran/ Iran
2015	Art for Peace	Niavaran Cultural Complex	Tehran/ Iran
2004	Iranian Graphic designers & calligraphy	Gallery La Louviere	La Louvière/ Belgium
2003	Graphic design	Chaumont gallery	Chaumont/ France
2002	Calligraphy	Court Yard Gallery	Dubai/ UAE
1998	Calligraphy	Court Yard Gallery	Dubai/ UAE
1992	Calligraphy	International Tehran Fair	Tehran/ Iran
