= Cyrus (1815 ship) =

History

United Kingdom
- Name: Cyrus
- Namesake: Cyrus
- Builder: Holt & Richardson, Whitby
- Fate: Lost July 1823

General characteristics
- Tons burthen: 346 (bm)

Cyrus was launched in Kingston upon Hull in 1815. She sailed on annual voyages to Greenland as a whaler until she was lost in July 1823.

== Career ==
Cyrus first entered Lloyd's Register (LR) in 1816.

Year	Master	Owner	Trade	Source & notes
1816	Beadling	J.Briggs	Hull–Greenland	LR

The following data is from Coltish:

Year	Master	Whales	Tuns whale oil	Seals
1815	Beadling	3	49	0
1816	Beadling	11	85	0
1817	Beadling	6	83	80
1818	Beadling	10	137	0
1819	Beadling	4	75	0
1820	Beadling	9	140	10
1821	Beadling	7	91	0
1822	Welburn	3	42	0
1823	Welburn	0	0	0

Cyrus was reported to have one fish and four tons on 8 June.

== Fate ==
On 8 November 1823 Perseverance, Simpson, master, arrived at Peterhead. She reported that two Hull whalers had been lost, Cyrus, Welburn, master, and Neptune, Munro, master. Cyrus had taken five fish, and Neptune, 19. Cyrus had been lost in July.
