= Kyro =

Kyro, Kyrö or KYRO may refer to:

- Kyrö Distillery Company in Finland
- Tuomas Kyrö (born 1974), a Finnish author and cartoonist
- PowerVR KYRO and KYRO 2, a series of graphics chips
- KYRO (AM), a radio station licensed to Potosi, Missouri, United States
