= Cirrus =

Cirrus may refer to:

== Science ==
- Cirrus (zoology), any of various thin, thread-like structures on the body of an animal
- Cirrus (botany), a tendril
- Infrared cirrus, in astronomy, filamentary structures seen in infrared light
- Cirrus cloud, a type of cloud

== Aviation ==
- Cirrus aero engines, a series of British aircraft engines manufactured by various companies from the 1920s to the 1950s
- Cirrus Aircraft, an aircraft manufacturer in Duluth, Minnesota, USA
- Cirrus Airlines, a defunct regional airline in Hallbergmoos, Germany
- Cirrus (rocket), a German research rocket first launched in 1961
- Schempp-Hirth Cirrus, an Open-class sailplane
- Schempp-Hirth Standard Cirrus, a Standard-class sailplane
- Swing Cirrus, a German paraglider design

== Music ==
- Cirrus (album), a 1974 release by Bobby Hutcherson
- Cirrus (band), an American electronica duo
- "Cirrus" (song), a 2013 instrumental by DJ Bonobo
- "Cirrus", a 1996 song by Joe Morris from Elsewhere
- "Cirrus Minor" (song), a 1969 song by Pink Floyd

== Other uses ==
- Chrysler Cirrus, a car produced by DaimlerChrysler between 1995 and 2000
- Cirrus (drug), a medication that contains pseudoephedrine and cetirizine
- Cirrus (Helsinki building), a high-rise apartment building in Helsinki, Finland
- Cirrus (Seattle building), a residential skyscraper in Seattle, Washington, USA
- Cirrus (interbank network), an automated teller machine (ATM) network owned by MasterCard
- Cirrus Logic, a semiconductor manufacturer
- Access Database Engine, former versions of which were known as Microsoft Jet Database Engine and codenamed Cirrus
- Cirrus Vodka, a vodka made in Richmond, Virginia, USA
- Cirrus Mountain, a mountain in Alberta
- Mount Cirrus. a mountain in Colorado
