= Cybele-class mine destructor vessel =

Class overview
- Name: Cybele-class mine destructor vessel
- Builders: William Denny and Brothers; Swan Hunter
- Operators: Royal Navy
- Built: 1943-1944
- In service: 1944-1946
- Completed: 2
- Lost: 1
- Scrapped: 1

General characteristics
- Displacement: 3,980 tonnes
- Length: 350 ft (110 m)
- Beam: 60 ft (18 m)
- Propulsion: None
- Crew: 0

The Cybele class was a class of trimaran ships, constructed by the Royal Navy during World War II for the purpose of clearing minefields. Referred to as Mine Destructor Vessels, two ships of the class, HMS Cybele and HMS Cyrus were built in 1944; one was lost following D-Day, while the other survived the war only to be scrapped shortly thereafter.

== Design and development ==
Officially designated as mine destructor vessels, the Cybele class was a large trimaran vessel, constructed using a steel lattice truss framework. They were intended to be towed through minefields that used pressure mines, creating a pressure wave that would detonate the mines; the open lattice construction of the ships would, according to the design, allow the blast to pass through the vessel without causing damage to it.

The ships were constructed under conditions of the utmost secrecy; they were originally referred to as 'Sterling craft', then later designated as being part of the Algerine class of fleet minesweepers; their design was still classified as late as the late 1960s.

== Operational history ==
Two ships of the class were ordered by the Admiralty, in September 1943. HMS Cybele was constructed by William Denny and Brothers on the River Clyde, while HMS Cyrus was built at the Swan Hunter shipyards in Wallsend. Both ships were launched in January 1944; transferred to Scott Lithgow, located on the lower Clyde, for completion and fitting out, the two vessels were commissioned in May of that year.

Both ships of the class saw use during Operation Overlord, the D-Day invasion of northern France; although the two vessels proved successful in operational service, when damaged they were difficult to control, being "as difficult to handle as a battleship". Cyrus was wrecked in the Seine Estuary in December 1944; Cybele survived the war, being scrapped in October 1946.
