= Bahram Kalhornia =

Iranian artist (born 1952)

- بهرام کلهرنیا
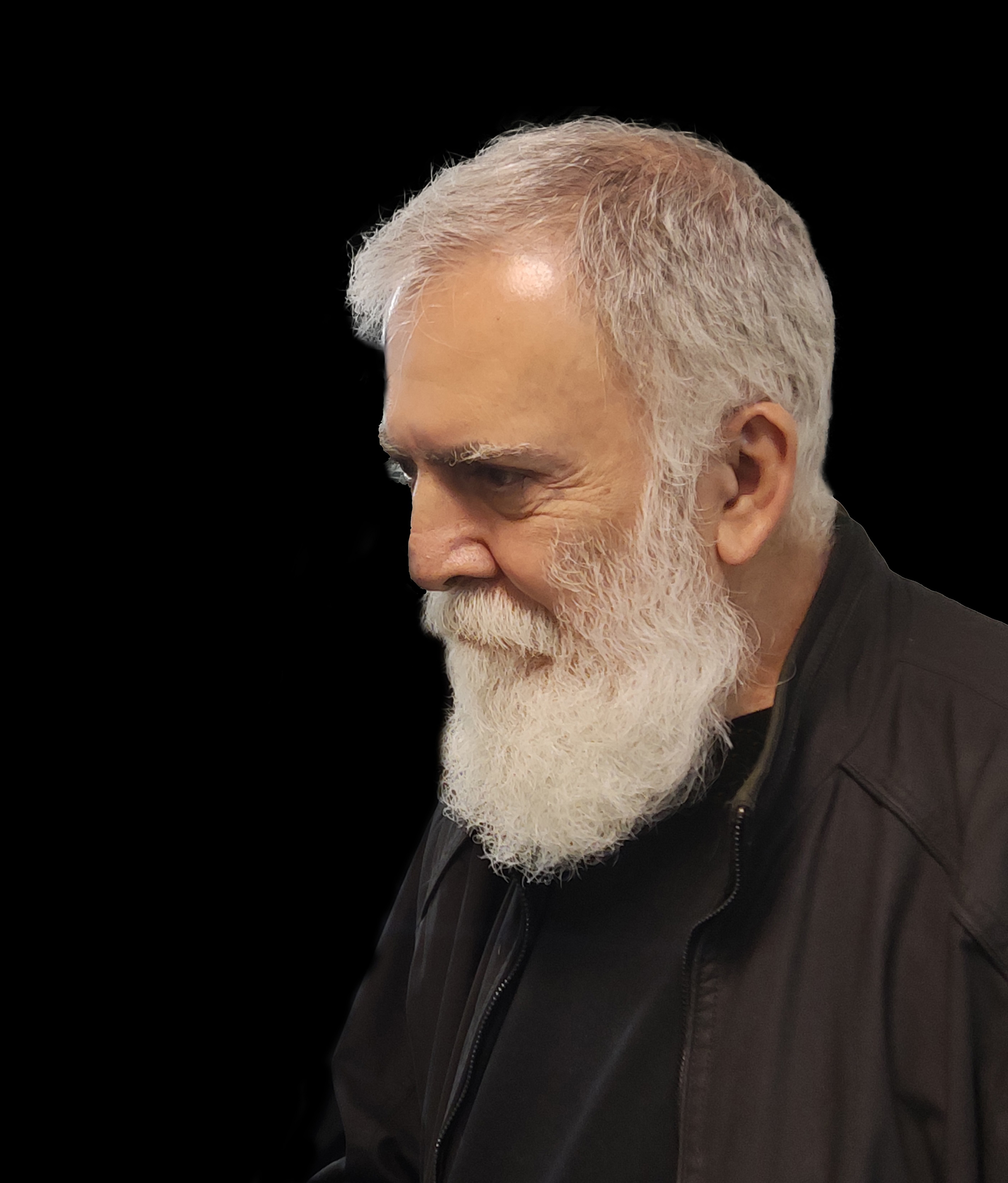
- Kalhornia in 2022
- Born: 30 March 1952 (age 74); Kermanshah, Iran
- Education: University of Decorative Arts
- Known for: Fine arts, drawing and painting
- Spouse: Forough Dorafshan

Bahram Kalhornia (Persian: بهرام کلهرنیا; 1952) is a drawing artist, sculptor, graphic designer, painter, researcher, and educator in the field of art from Iran.

== Origin and early life ==
Kalhornia was born into a prominent family with a cultural background from the Kurdish Kalhor tribe in Kermanshah on March 30, 1952. Throughout his childhood and youth, living in the city and the countryside allowed him to experience the vibrant nature of the western region of Iran, and become familiar with and benefit from the world of plants and animals. Additionally, his exposure to the stories, beliefs, ethnic experiences, work methods, and lifestyles of the people, as well as hearing epic tales from Ferdowsi's Shahnameh and Kurdish Shahnameh, and blending these concepts with the lifestyle and aspirations of the tribal community, left a profound and lasting impact on him, greatly influencing his life path and the works he created. During his school days at Dr. Abdolhamid Zangeneh High School in Kermanshah, the presence of influential and humanistic teachers such as Saeednia, Etekal, Toulaii, Nazempour, Katanchi, Sadri, and others expanded his thinking, and attention to the value of “questioning”. In his childhood and adolescence, due to the cultural atmosphere of his family, guidance, and support from some relatives, the enthusiasm for reading took root in him, and it was during this period that he eagerly read various books in the fields of sciences, sociology, history, and especially classical literature with great interest.

== Education ==
In 1972, by entering the University of Decorative Arts in Tehran, Kalhornia became acquainted with a variety of artistic practices and various fields of visual work. The formation of new social relationships between him and the professors and fellow students created years full of intellectual motivations for him. His years at the university provided a good opportunity for practice, work, effort, and discovery. During these years, his presence beside his professors such as Shiddel, Lilit Teryan, Hossein Kazemi, Mohammad Ebrahim Jafari, Gholamhossein Nami, Mirfenderski, Anvari, and Ahrari contributed to the flourishing of his existential values. Among them, Shiddel and Teryan, in closer relationships, influenced his emotional-intellectual life. More than two years of companionship and collaboration with Professor Shiddel during the execution of a large mural painting at the Agricultural Palace in Tehran led to development of his intellectual and practical abilities in artistic activities. During his years at the University of Decorative Arts, he carried out pioneering and cultural activities due to social motivations in cooperation with some professors and fellow students. Initiating the first student magazine, establishing a library, forming a theater group under the guidance of Professor Abolhasan Vandehvar, organizing poetry and literature nights, lectures, and dozens of other efforts all contributed to the creation of a comprehensive and dynamic cultural perspective, and the results of these capabilities proved beneficial in the subsequent years in the course of his educational experiences as an art instructor.

== Activities and profession ==
After completing his military service, Kalhornia collaborated with the University of Art for one year. Returning to Kermanshah during the Iran-Iraq war, with the intention of working, being active, and serving in his hometown, provided an opportunity to establish the first School of Visual Arts for Boys in Kermanshah and collaborate with art education centers and other organizations. This period also contributed to the formation of the foundations of his thoughts regarding the remnants of the traditional way of life and the mythological thinking of the Kurdish people in the region, which over time led to a more comprehensive understanding of national foundational myths.

The establishment of the Kermanshah Visual Art School, along with his wife Forough Dorafshan and Morteza Sharifi, created a chance for talented young people to find new opportunities for growth and development. From this art school emerged some figures in Iran’s contemporary world of art and contemplation, such as Fereidoun Biglari (archaeologist), Ardeshir Pazhouheshi, Masoud Hemmati, Mohammad Reza Naderi, Kamran Sharifi, and others. After returning to Tehran, his collaboration with the Faculty of Art and Architecture of the Central Tehran Branch of the Islamic Azad University began in 1990. His teaching career continued until 2022. During these years, many individuals in the fields of intellectual, scientific, and artistic activities flourished under his influence. The Department of Visual Design under his management from 1996, had a successful educational period.

Teaching various art disciplines at the Faculty of Cinema and Broadcasting and other educational centers, collaborating with the commission for authoring art education books of the University of Applied Science and Technology, and collaborating with governmental and non-governmental organizations, both nationally and internationally, as a consultant and advisor in research, art, and culture are among his activities.

His teaching method arises from the interweaving of artistic, spiritual, psychological, and philosophical values. He draws inspiration from ancient Iranian myths in creating his works, and the concept of good and evil in them is reflected extensively. Some critics consider him the William Blake of Iran, and he is also remembered as one of the prominent representatives of Iranian painting-poetry.

Throughout the years, due to his intellectual position and diverse thinking, he presented numerous lectures on various concepts in various centers.

Planning, consulting, and executing cultural projects, and participating in many art festivals as a member of the policy-making council, director, or judge, are among his activities. Various artistic-cultural commissions, especially in the Ministry of Culture and Islamic Guidance, IRIB, Ministry of Petroleum, Ministry of Energy, Khuzestan Sugar Cane Board, municipalities, Jahad University, various museums, and also civil institutions such as UNESCO and UNICEF, have benefited from his skills and way of thinking in multiple periods. Serving as an art director, both in economic projects and cultural institutions or with publishers, has been part of his efforts.

Alongside these activities, participation in group art exhibitions and holding several solo exhibitions are also notable in his portfolio.

Due to his analytical-critical thinking, extensive engagement in visual projects and educational studies, and dissemination of certain perspectives, Kalhornia has become known as an independent figure and a thinker. Over the years, various national organizations and institutions have held ceremonies to honor him. These include the Niavaran Cultural Center, Administration of Culture and Islamic Guidance of Kermanshah, the award of the Sarv-e Mordad medal by the Graphic Designers Association of Kermanshah in recognition of his founding of graphic education in Kermanshah (2011), the launch of the Cultural House in Sarpol-e Zahab in his name, and others.

Since the formation of the Iranian Graphic Designers Society (IGDS), Bahram Kalhornia, along with other graphic pioneers, has collaborated as a member and in some periods as a member of the board of directors with the association and has had an influential role in shaping its legal framework and drafting executive regulations. Since 2011, he has also been an honorary member of the Graphic Designers Association of Kermanshah.

During a period of activities at IRIB, while providing technical consultations to improve production quality in Channel 4, he produced programs such as "Simaye 4" and "Char Khand-e Kherad" in 2007-2008 with a cultural and social focus, presenting analytical and critical analyses.

In 2019, Bahram Kalhornia established "Vard Gallery," a cultural center to fulfill his artistic-cultural desires and aspirations, enabling him to continue his activities in a new role. This led to the organization of numerous exhibitions and numerous critical analysis and discussion sessions on artistic concepts. These days, alongside cultural-artistic-research activities, he is actively involved as the chairman of the board of directors of the Iranian Graphic Designers Society (IGDS) and a member of the Supreme Council of the Iranian Artists Forum in creating suitable conditions for the activities of artists and cultural figures.

In an interview about his artworks in the "Sahm-e Shak (Share of Doubt)” solo exhibition, he said: "In my works, I have placed mirrors in front of my viewers so that they may discover other aspects of their existence. If we set aside physical appearance, there is something else within us, within our beings. Inside me, riders and warriors have set an ambush. Inside another person, bandits lie in wait, and inside yet another, a mythical bird sings. Life has blocked the expression of these creatures. We do not see our hidden selves, and we have closed our ears to our storyteller's voice. I have awakened these things and shown the viewer that they also reside within. When several people like one drawing, I realize what interesting commonalities exist among them. I realize that the hidden entity and the archetypal existence can sensitize people to these paintings and uplift them. This is important to me.

The reality of the matter is that these things have not suddenly appeared; they have existed before me. The world is an eternal phenomenon, and I only have a short opportunity to experience a small section of existence. The eternal entity of existence flows within me. I live my life differently, whether in the awe of my cosmic existence or the awe of my personal life. I have read well, lived well, utilized the resources of the world well, and been enriched by the blessings of the universe. I believe that every person has multiple personas within themselves; beings that lie beneath their skin and are destined to awaken and take charge at any moment. If anyone observes their behavior from dawn to dusk, they can understand the changes within themselves. A person is constantly changing, and this change is connected to the breath of the entities within us.

In the thoughts of the wise scholars of Iranian contemplation, the diversity, the thousand faces, and the Simurgh-like nature of individuals are always discussed. I take this very seriously and believe that the history of each individual is embedded with thousands of people. Sometimes we do not perceive it, and sometimes it is close to us. Due to my way of life, I have become close to this world. Not only have I become close to it, but in returning to within, I have played, been childish, mischievous, and lazy. I have stood alongside heroes, criminals, outlaws, and... I have wandered in this world, slept, woken up, and fallen in love. I do not want to believe, but I want to accept that the destiny that humanity has found and has turned into a superficial and low-quality consumer is the authentic destiny of humanity. I believe that the existential roots of humans are much richer and stronger than what they, themselves think. We have a historical entity, and in this historical entity, the wonders of creation are found, and these wonders are other faces of our existence that have come in this form."

Hossein Norouzi, an art critic and painter, wrote about Kalhornia's works in the solo exhibition "Sahm-e Shak (Share of Doubt)”: "Personalities and special talents and creativity of some individuals seem to be overlooked among many, often remaining unseen or barely noticed. I'm referring to someone like Bahram Kalhornia. A man whose cloak of many knowledge and arts are fitting and dignified on him, and no cloak of Iranian knowledge and culture and art does not suit him.

He is an artist, teacher, and public speaker who has participated in public events and media programs. His work has been associated with management and contemporary art in Iran.

Bahram Kalhornia is exhibiting a collection of drawings at A Gallery in Tehran. These works feature dimensions that differ from standard sizes. The exhibition includes drawings that have not been previously displayed. The compositions focus on themes involving ancient myths and contemporary figures.

== Activities and roles of Bahram Kalhornia ==
- Membership in the boards of various sessions of the Iranian Graphic Designers Society (IGDS)
- Membership in the Supreme Council of the Iranian Artists Forum
- Membership in the commission for sending artists to the Cité Internationale des Arts in Paris since 2012
- Consulting and collaboration with UNICEF and UNESCO organizations
- Membership in the supervisory council for the reconstruction of the Tehran Museum of Contemporary Art
- High-level consultant for the Cinema Museum of Iran
- Consultant of Iran Photo Museum
- Membership in the Visual Arts Committee of the Iranian Artists Forum
- Membership in the committee for determining the copyright of artists
- Consulting and collaboration with the Children's Book Council
- Consulting and collaboration with the World Children's Institute
- Collaboration with various publishers as an art director
- Art director of the "Exploration" journal of the Ministry of Petroleum
- Membership in the specialized committee for the compilation of graphic design textbooks at the University of Applied Science and Technology
- Membership in the color policy commission in Tehran's urban beautification department
- General secretary of the "Blue Sky" Poster and Caricature Festival in Tehran in 1997
- Jury member of the First "Ordibehesht" Research Awards in 2007
- Advisor and member of the Commission for the Establishment of the Museum of the Islamic Consultative Assembly, 2007
- Secretary of the Committee for Strategic Studies in Art Affairs of Tehran Municipality, 2008
- Judge of the Eighth Annual Picture Festival, 2010
- Secretary-general of the Second Festival of Urban Postcards of Tehran Municipality, 2010
- Member of the Special Council for the Examination of Artistic Works Registration at the Ministry of Guidance, 2011-2013
- Art expert of the International Festival of Visual Arts for Children and Youth, 2012
- Membership in the policymaking council of national and international biennials and numerous festivals such as Tehran International Graphic Design Biennale, Fajr visual festivals, Shamseh festivals, international and national youth visual arts festivals
- Secretary-general, secretaryship, and judge for many visual festivals such as the Fajr Visual Festival, National Advertising Festivals, and National Television Festivals.
- Art adviser for governmental organizations such as the Ministry of Petroleum, National Museum of Iran, Ministry of Energy, Ministry of Culture and Islamic Guidance, Ministry of Education, and various banks
- Organizing art workshops
- Holding analytical-scientific lectures and seminars
- Graphic designer and art director for private-sector organizations
- Cooperation in planning and education with different cultural-educational institutions in the private sector
- Designing and constructing Mina statue for the first International Puppet Festival in Iran
- Designing and constructing the first and second statue for the Sima Festival
- Art adviser and graphic designer for the Sima Festival
- Consultant and expert of the deputy of Virtual Media of Sima

== Publications ==
- Kalhornia, B., 2006. "Mehrnegarineh", an album of calligraphy works by Mousavi Jazayeri in Kufic script.
- Kalhornia, B., 2010. "Neshaneh be Sar: Mythical Bird of Graphic Design", the bird that gives identity wherever it flies, adds meaning. Sign sometimes adds a thousand sermons: Selected works of graphic designers from Kermanshah, Ferdabeh.
- Mousavi Jazayeri, S.M.V., Ghlichkhani, H., Kalhornia, B., 2013. "From Kufic Inscriptions to Contemporary Typography, Steps Toward a Comprehensive and Deserving Persian Font."
- Kalhornia, B., 2014. "Full Moon Mother, Full Sun Father", on the occasion of Children's Week, National Museum of Iran, Tehran.
- Kalhornia, B., 2017. "Share of Doubt", Selected Works, A Gallery, Tehran.
- Zadeyeh Khorshid, Scientific Editor
- Art-Science Book (from UNESCO Publications), Art Editor
- Kalhornia, B., 2012. "Baniasadi’s Birth Place and Background, Mohammed Ali Baniasadi: History and Innovation", Bookbird: A Journal of International Children's Literature
- Articles and interviews published in various newspapers and magazines such as Jahate Etela (Specialized Journal of the Iranian Graphic Designers Society (IGDS)), Tandis, Paayaab, Donya-ye Sokhan, Adineh, Shargh, Ettela'at, Iran, Entekhab, Tamashegaraan, Manzar, Mash’al (Ministry of Petroleum Magazine) ...

== Curating and organizing group exhibitions ==
- 2020 - Group graphic exhibition "Woman+Man", Vard Gallery, Tehran
- 2020 - Group illustration exhibition "From Devil to Angel to Good to Evil to Black to White to Color In the Twilight of Imagination and Myth and Painting", Vard Gallery, Tehran
- 2020 - Group calligraphy exhibition "Three Thousand Times Writing", Vard Gallery, Tehran
- 2020 - Group illustration exhibition "Guardian of the City of Shahrazad", Vard Gallery, Tehran
- 2022 - Group drawing exhibition "His Highness Mr. Huntsman", Vard Gallery, Tehran
- 2022 - Group handprint exhibition "Bargardaan", Vard Gallery, Tehran

== Solo exhibitions ==
- 2005 - "Stone Song", Drawing Exhibition, Zangar Gallery, Tehran
- 2016 - "Share of Doubt", Drawing Exhibition, A Gallery, Tehran

== Group exhibitions ==
- 1975 - Student Photography Group Exhibition, University of Decorative Arts, Tehran
- ? - Individual and Group Design Exhibition, Punch Gallery, Kermanshah
- ? - International Group Drawing Exhibition, Museum of Contemporary Art, Tehran
- ? - International Drawing Biennial, Museum of Contemporary Art, Tehran
- ? - Graphic Group Exhibition, Imam Ali Museum, Tehran
- ? - Graphic Group Exhibition, Iranian Artists Forum, Tehran
- ? - Image of the Year Group Exhibition, Iranian Artists Forum, Tehran
- 2016 - "Poetics: Passage through Dreams", Laleh Gallery, Tehran
- 2018 - "Drawing as Living", Group Drawing Exhibition, House of Artists, Tehran
- 2019 - "Woman+Man", Group Graphic Exhibition, Vard Gallery, Tehran
- 2019 - " From Devil to Angel to Good to Evil to Black to White to Color In the twilight of Imagination and Myth and painting ", Group Illustration Exhibition, Vard Gallery, Tehran
