= Jackson Andrews =

American professional wrestler (born 1979)

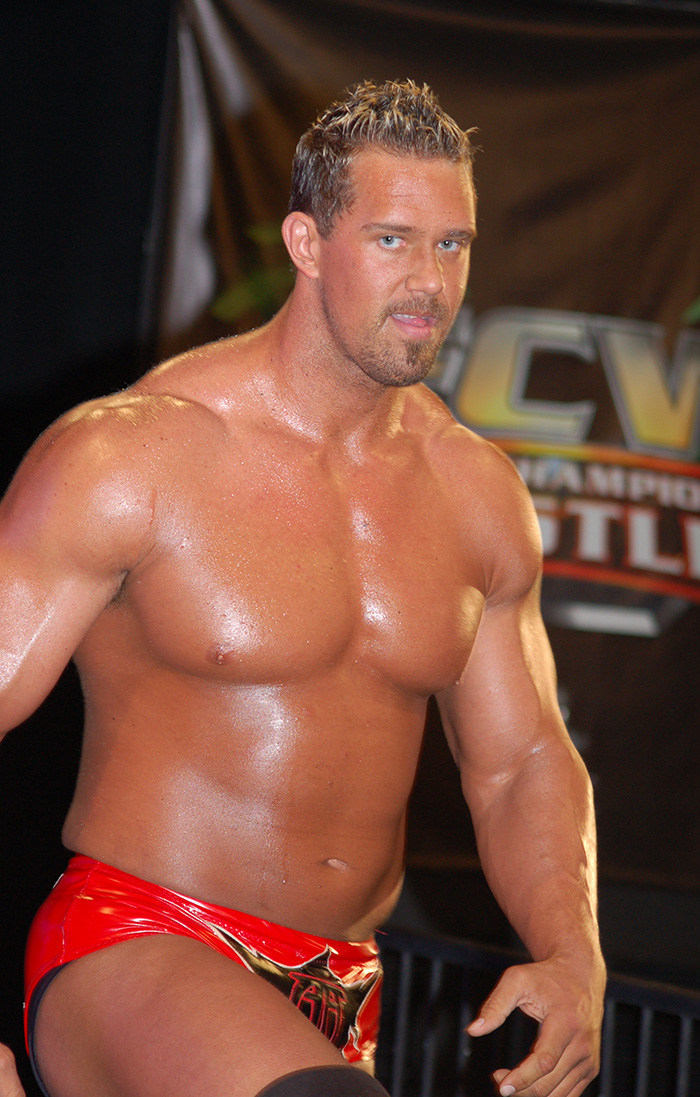
- Jackson Andrews in October 2010 at the FCW arena

Personal information
- Born: Steven Andrew Slocum; November 5, 1979 (age 46) West Monroe, Louisiana, U.S.
- Education: Texas A&M University

Professional wrestling career
- Ring name(s): Cyrus; Jackson Andrews; Steven Slocum
- Billed height: 6 ft 11 in (211 cm)
- Billed weight: 300 lb (136 kg)
- Billed from: Houston, Texas, United States
- Trained by: Booker T Florida Championship Wrestling
- Debut: 2007
- Retired: May 2011

Steven Andrew "Steve" Slocum (born November 5, 1979) is an American retired professional wrestler, better known for his time in World Wrestling Entertainment under the ring name Jackson Andrews, where he acted as Tyson Kidd's enforcer while on the Raw brand. He is also known for his work in the WWE developmental promotion Florida Championship Wrestling (FCW).

== Basketball career ==
Slocum attended Texas A&M University from 1999 to 2004 and lettered on the Texas A&M Aggies men's basketball team as a center in the 1999–00 season, then from 2001 to 2004. After Texas A&M, he played professional basketball in Europe as Andy Slocum, first for Club Melilla Baloncesto of the Spanish second-tier LEB Oro, then for Galatasaray of the Turkish Basketball League.

== Professional wrestling career ==
=== Early career (2007–2009) ===
Slocum wrestled as 'Cyrus' for the Pro Wrestling Alliance (PWA) in Texas, where he was managed by Lady Poison. He made his PWA debut at Clash of Champions on July 21, 2007 in Pasadena, Texas, where he defeated Devin in a squash match. He also appeared at PWA's next show, Midsummer Madness, where he defeated Santana in a squash. Cyrus went on to defeat Nicolas, Samson, and Robbie Gilmore throughout late 2007 and early 2008.

=== World Wrestling Entertainment (2009–2011) ===
In September 2009, it was reported that Slocum had signed a contract with World Wrestling Entertainment (WWE), and had been assigned to Florida Championship Wrestling (FCW), a WWE developmental territory under the ring name 'Jackson Andrews'. He made his in-ring debut in late 2009.

In early 2010, Andrews formed an alliance and tag team with Curt Hawkins, with the pair debuting as a tag team on February 18 by defeating The South Beach Boys (Darren Young and Percy Watson). The two began feuding with Hawkins' former stablemates The Dude Busters (Caylen Croft and Trent Barreta), who Hawkins had abandoned to ally with Andrews. Andrews went on to defeat both Croft and Barreta in singles matches in March. Over the next few months, Andrews and Hawkins went on to face The Rotundo Brothers (Bo and Duke), and the team of Eli Cottonwood and Wes Brisco. In November and December, Andrews appeared at several WWE house shows, losing to Goldust and twice defeating JTG.

On the December 6, 2010, episode of Raw, Slocum appeared as the unidentified bodyguard for Tyson Kidd, accompanying Kidd to the ring and attacking Kidd's opponent, David Hart Smith. The following week, Kidd introduced him as 'Jackson Andrews'. On the December 27 episode of Raw, Andrews had an in-ring confrontation with Mark Henry after Henry had defeated Kidd, but Henry performed his finishing move on Andrews. After this, Slocum was sent back to FCW for more training. He was released by WWE in May 2011, upon which he retired from professional wrestling.

== Personal life ==
Slocum was engaged to fellow wrestler Milena Roucka in 2012. On August 5, 2012, Roucka filed battery charges against Slocum with the San Antonio Police Department, over an earlier incident at their Las Vegas home. Roucka stated that she was afraid Slocum would kill her, and that abuse was an ongoing problem. Police photographed scratches and bruises on her body. It was then revealed that Slocum was also engaged to another woman, Amber Stoval, who he had been dating for four years prior.

Slocum is the nephew of R. C. Slocum.

== Championships and accomplishments ==
- Pro Wrestling Illustrated
  - PWI ranked Andrews #320 of the top 500 singles wrestlers in the PWI 500 in 2010
