= HMS Cyrus =

Three vessels of the Royal Navy have been named HMS Cyrus after Cyrus the Great:

- HMS Cyrus (1782) was the merchant sloop Cyrus purchased by the Royal Navy in 1782. She was commissioned as a transport and then in 1783 converted into a 16-gun armed ship. She was wrecked at Barbados on 22 April 1786.
- HMS Cyrus (1813) was a 20-gun Cyrus-class ship-sloop. She was sold on 23 May 1823.
- HMS Cyrus (1943) was a Cybele-class mine destructor vessel completed in October 1943. She was wrecked in the Seine Estuary on 5 December 1944.
