= Michael Avery =

American lawyer

- Citizenship: American
- Occupation: Professor
- Employer: Suffolk University Law School

Michael Avery is a professor at Suffolk University Law School and a civil rights lawyer. He was the president of the National Lawyers Guild from 2003 to 2006.

He is currently the President of the Board of the National Police Accountability Project.

Avery edited and was a contributing author to the 2008 book We Dissent: Talking Back to the Rehnquist Court, which received favorable reviews in Trial and Choice.

He is also the coauthor of:

- Avery, Michael, David Rudovsky, Karen Blum, and Jennifer Lauin, Police Misconduct: Law and Litigation. New York: Thomson Reuters, updated annually.
- Brodin, Mark and Avery, Michael, Handbook of Massachusetts Evidence, Wolters Kluwer, updated annually.
- Avery, Michael, and Danielle McLaughlin. The Federalist Society: How Conservatives Took the Law Back from Liberals+ book. Nashville, Tenn: Vanderbilt University Press, 2013
- Avery, Michael, Glannon Guide to Evidence, Wolters Kluwer, 2018.

His first novel, The Cooperating Witness, will be published by Literary Wanderlust in the summer of 2020.
