= Saint Syrus =

Saint Syrus or St Syrus may refer to:

- Syrus of Genoa (died 381), bishop of Genoa
- Syrus of Pavia (fl. 1st century AD), bishop of Pavia

== See also ==
- San Siro, football stadium
- Siro (disambiguation)
