= Cyrus (restaurant) =

Restaurant in Geyserville, California, U.S.

- Interactive map of Cyrus

Restaurant information
- Established: March 4, 2005
- Owners: Douglas Keane, Nick Peyton
- Head chef: Douglas Keane
- Chef: Drew Glassell
- Pastry chef: Josh Gaulin
- Food type: Californian; modern
- Rating: (Michelin Guide), AAA Five Diamond Award (2023-2025)
- Location: 275 CA-128, Geyserville, California, 95441, United States
- Coordinates: 38°42′23″N 122°54′2″W
- Website: www.cyrusrestaurant.com

Cyrus is a fine dining restaurant in Geyserville, California, co-owned by chef Douglas Keane and serving modern California cuisine. From 2005 to 2012, it was located in Healdsburg, where it was awarded two Michelin stars in the first Michelin Red Guide to San Francisco and the Bay Area. It reopened in Geyserville in 2022 and was awarded one Michelin star.

== History ==
Chef Douglas Keane opened Cyrus with Nick Peyton as partner and maitre d' on March 4, 2005 at Hotel Les Mars in Healdsburg, California, naming it for Cyrus Alexander. In September 2006, Cyrus was rated third in the Zagat Survey of San Francisco Bay Area Restaurants for 2007. The following month, it was one of four restaurants to receive two stars in the first Michelin Guide to San Francisco, Bay Area & Wine Country (the second regional Michelin Guide for the United States, after New York City). After the hotel was acquired by new owners, leading to a dispute, Keane sold the restaurant to the landlords while retaining the Cyrus name, and it closed in early November 2012.

Keane said in 2017 that he hoped to reopen Cyrus in 2019 somewhere in the Alexander Valley, but in 2019, after a series of failed negotiations, he said that he would not reopen the restaurant.

In 2020, Keane was offered the ground floor of a live-work property in Geyserville, a former prune-packing plant that had been adapted by Jensen Architects, approximately 8 miles (13 km) from the Healdsburg location. After a delay because of the COVID-19 pandemic, permits for modifications including the addition of a kitchen were issued in 2021, and Cyrus reopened on September 9, 2022. The restaurant was awarded one Michelin star that December, which it has retained. In 2023 it received the AAA Five Diamond Award in 2023.

A conflict with the landlord over the selection of contractors and shared use issues including employee parking was resolved with mediation in May 2024 and a judge's ruling in October 2024 awarding Keane most of his legal costs. In June 2024, a group of private investors bought the property, including 6 acres of land; with Keane, they plan to convert the apartments above the restaurant, together with the caretaker's cottage, into a six-room hotel and add a herb garden, orchard, and live-fire grill area for the restaurant.

== Restaurant ==
The Michelin Guide classifies Cyrus' cuisine as Californian and modern, with global accents; reviews in the San Francisco Chronicle mention Asian influences from Keane's time cooking at the Japanese Culinary Academy in Kyoto. Dining is progressive: diners eat the 20-course tasting menu as they move in groups of a dozen through a series of seating areas, one offering a complete view of the kitchen with the option to interact with those working there and the last being a "hidden" dessert room with a chocolate waterfall. (A design for a site offered to Cyrus by the Dry Creek Rancheria Band of Pomo Indians had already been based on this concept of a "culinary journey".) The Bubbles Lounge, the starting point of the dining sequence, also offers cocktails and small bites without reservations. It has a Champagne cart, carried over from the Healdsburg restaurant. In Healdsburg, Cyrus also had a caviar cart, which Keane says was inspired by a three-star Paris restaurant, and typically there would be "18 service people in the front of the house wheeling caviar and cheese carts, pouring water and wine, and delivering the 5- and 8-course tasting dishes to up to 60 guests at one time" "with military precision". In Geyserville, Keane reduced staffing and cross-trained employees in order to offer better pay, health insurance, and paid vacations.

== See also ==
- List of Michelin-starred restaurants in California
