= Kouros (disambiguation) =

Kouros is a type of Ancient Greek sculpture, which represents a naked male youth.

Kouros may also refer to:

- Kroisos Kouros, a marble kouros from Anavyssos in Attica
- Blond Kouros's Head of the Acropolis, head of a lost marble statue of a young man now in the Acropolis Museum in Athens
- Getty kouros, an over-life-sized dolomitic marble statue bought by the J. Paul Getty Museum
- Kouros of Tenea, the grave statue of a youth from Tenea

== Persons ==
- Kouros Shahmiri, an Iranian famous singer (solo and as part of Andy & Kouros)
- Alexis Kouros, a Finnish writer, documentary-maker, director and producer
- Yiannis Kouros, Greek ultramarathon runner based in Melbourne, Australia

== Various ==
- Kouros (perfume), a fragrance marketed by Yves Saint Laurent

== See also ==
- Kourosh (disambiguation)
- Kuros (disambiguation)
