= Siro (name) =

Siro is a masculine given name and a surname. It originated from the Latin words Syrus and Syrius referring to the Aramaic people residing in Syria until the 16th century.

Notable people with the name include:

== Given name ==
- Siro the Epicurean, philosopher who lived in Naples
- Siro Baroni (1678–1746), Italian painter
- Siro Bianchi (1924–1992), French cyclist
- Siro Darino (born 1976), Argentine football player
- Siro Lombardini (1924—2013), Italian economist and politician
- Siro López (born 1956), Spanish journalist
- Siro Marcellini (born 1921), Italian director and screenwriter
- Siro Meli (1946–2018), Italian rower

== Surname ==
- Fernando Siro (1931–2006), Argentine film actor, film director and screenwriter

== Fictional characters ==
- Siro (fictional character)
