= Kurush =

Kurush may refer to:

== Currencies ==
- kuruş, unit of currency in the Ottoman Empire and Turkey

== People ==
- Cyrus the Great (600–530 BC), founder of the Achaemenid Persian Empire
- Kurush Bharucha-Reid (1955 – 2010), officer in the United States Army
- Kurush Deboo (born 1963), Indian actor

== Places ==
- Kurush, Dokuzparinsky District, Republic of Dagestan, village in Dokuzparinsky District, Dagestan, Russia
- Kurush, Khasavyurtovsky District, Republic of Dagestan, village in Khasavyurtovsky District, Dagestan, Russia
- Kurush, Tajikistan, village in Sughd Region
