= Kouros Maghsoudi =

New York-based furniture designer and urban designer

Kouros Maghsoudi (born 1995) is a New York-based furniture designer and urban designer.

== Early life and education ==
Maghsoudi grew up in Highland Park, Illinois.

He graduated from the Parsons The New School of Design.

== Work ==
In 2021, the designer presented Mehmooni, their debut furniture collection. It was designed share the spirit of a Mehmooni, “gathering” or “party” in Persian. Maghsoudi is inspired by his Persian and Iranian background and includes his Taarof table, a modular cocktail table with an optional built-in ice bucket, ashtray, and fruit bowl, as an example this.

In spring of 2023, he presented his Bundle Collection, a line of metal-based pieces inspired by gauche New York hedonism. Works in this collection made by the designer include the Dose Table, a pill-shaped small table with a fuzzy interior cavity; a Thong Chair, a steel piece with an undergarment design; a Hairy Neo-Lounge Chair, inspired by Space Age furry exteriors, and a Hug Ashtray, a hand-poured ceramic work.

Maghsoudi shows alongside Studio Boheme, Atelier Caracas, and OM Editions at Primaried Studio in Miami, Florida.

The designer's works are made from renewable resources with FSC-certified wood, handmade in New York. He cites Sam Stewart, Eny Lee Parker, RATIO ET MOTUS, Gae Aulenti, Joe Colombo, Mario Botta, and Radical Design movement in Italy as references.
