= Koreshk, South Khorasan =

Koreshk كرشك
- Village
- Location within Iran
- Coordinates: 33°23′09″N 59°18′49″E
- Country: Iran
- Province: South Khorasan
- County: Qaen
- Bakhsh: Sedeh
- Rural District: Sedeh

Population (2006)
  - Total: 46
- Time zone: UTC+3:30 (IRST)
  - Summer (DST): UTC+4:30 (IRDT)

Koreshk (Persian: كرشك; also known as Qoreysh and Quraish) is a village in Sedeh Rural District, Sedeh District, Qaen County, South Khorasan Province, Iran. At the 2006 census, its population was 46, in 22 families.
