= Cyrus =

- Pronunciation: /ˈsaɪrəs/
- Gender: Male

Origin
- Origin: Persian
- Derivation: 𐎤𐎢𐎽𐎢𐏁 (Kūruš)
- Meaning: "Sun", "One who bestows care"
- Region of origin: Persia

Other names
- Alternative spelling: Kourosh, Kurush, Koresh
- Related names: Ciro

Cyrus (Persian: کوروش) is a Persian-language masculine given name. It is historically best known as the name of several Persian kings, most notably Cyrus the Great, who founded the Achaemenid Empire in 550 BC. It remains widespread among Zoroastrians, particularly in India, and is also relatively common in the Anglophone world.

== Etymology ==
Cyrus, as a word in English, is the Latinized form of the Greek Κῦρος, Kȳros, from Old Persian 𐎤𐎢𐎽𐎢𐏁 Kūruš. According to the inscriptions, the name is reflected in Elamite Kuraš, Babylonian Ku(r)-raš/-ra-áš and Imperial Aramaic kwrš. The modern Persian form of the name is Kūroš.

The etymology of Cyrus has been and continues to be a topic of discussion amongst historians, linguists, and scholars of Iranology. The Old Persian name "kuruš" has been interpreted in various forms such as "the Sun", "like Sun", "young", "hero," and "humiliator of the enemy in verbal contest" and the Elamite "kuraš" has been translated as one "who bestows care".

The name has appeared on many monuments and inscriptions in Old Persian. There is also the record of a small inscription in Morghab (southwestern Iran) on which there is the sentence (adam kūruš xšāyaθiya haxāmanišiya) in Old Persian meaning (I am Cyrus the Achaemenian King). After a questionable proposal by the German linguist F. H. Weissbach that Darius the Great was the first to inscribe in Persian, it had previously been concluded by some scholars that the inscription in Morghab refers to Cyrus the Younger. This proposal resulted from a false interpretation of a passage in paragraph 70 of the Behistun inscription by Darius the Great. Based on many arguments, the accepted theory among modern scholars is that the inscription does belong to Cyrus the Great.

There are interpretations of the name of Cyrus by classical authors identifying with or referring to the Persian word for "Sun". The Historian Plutarch (46–120) states that "the sun, which, in the Persian language, is called Cyrus". Also, the Physician Ctesias who served in the court of the Persian king Artaxerxes II of Persia writes in his book Persica as summarized by Photios that the name Cyrus is from the Persian word "Khur" (the sun). These are, however, not accepted by modern scholars.

Regarding the etymology of Old Persian kuruš, linguists have proposed various etymologies based on Iranian languages as well as non-Indo-European ones. According to Tavernier, the name kuraš, attested in Elamite texts, is likely "the original form" as there is no Elamite or Babylonian spelling ku-ru-uš in the transcriptions of Old Persian ku-u-r(u)-u-š. That is, according to Tavernier, kuraš is an Elamite name and means "to bestow care". Others, such as Schmitt, Hoffmann maintain that the Persian Kuruš, which according to Skalmowsky, may be connected to (or borrowing from) the IE Kúru- from Old Indic can give an etymology of the Elamite kuraš. In this regard, the Old Persian kuruš is considered with the following etymologies: One proposal is discussed by the linguist Janos Harmatta that refers to the common Iranian root "kur-" (be born) of many words in Old, middle, and new Iranian languages (e.g. Kurdish). Accordingly, the name Kūruš means "young, youth...". Other Iranian etymologies have been proposed. The Indian proposal of Skalmowsky goes down to "to do, accomplish". Another theory is the suggestion of Karl Hoffmann that kuruš goes down to a -ru derivation from the IE root *(s)kau meaning "to humiliate" and accordingly "kuruš" (hence "Cyrus") means "humiliator (of the enemy in verbal contest)".

== People ==
=== Given name ===
==== Ancient world ====
Ordered chronologically

- Cyrus I (c. 650 BC), King of Anshan
- Cyrus the Great (c. 600 BC or 576 BC–530 BC), also known as Cyrus II, the grandson of Cyrus I, Achaemenid ruler and founder of the Persian Empire
- Cyrus the Younger (died 401 BC), brother of the Persian King Artaxerxes
- Cyrus (architect) (died 52 BC), Greek architect who worked in Rome
- Saint Cyrus (see Cyrus and John) (died c. 304 or 311), Coptic saint
- Cyrus I of Edessa, bishop (died 396)
- Cyrus of Panopolis ((fl. 426–441), Byzantine official, epic poet and philosopher
- Cyrus II of Edessa, bishop (died 498)
- Cyrus of Alexandria (died 642), Melkite Patriarch and co-founder of Monothelism

==== Modern era ====
- Cyrus Allen (born 2003), American football player
- Cyrus Leroy Baldridge (1889–1977), American artist, illustrator, author and adventurer
- Cyrus Townsend Brady (1861–1920), American journalist, historian and adventure writer
- Cyrus Baguio (born 1980), Filipino basketball player
- Cyrus Broacha (born 1971), MTV India VJ
- Cyrus S. Ching (1876–1967), Canadian-American industrialist, civil servant and union mediator
- Cyrus Christie (born 1992), English footballer
- Cyrus Chothia (1942–2019), English biochemist
- Cyrus Edwin Dallin (1861–1944), American sculptor
- Cyrus S. Eaton (1883–1979), Canadian-American banker, investor and philanthropist
- Cyrus Edwards (1793–1877), American politician and lawyer
- Cyrus West Field (1819–1892), American businessman who laid the first transatlantic telegraph cable
- Cyrus Frisch (born 1969), Dutch film director
- Cyrus Gray (born 1989), American National Football League player
- Cyrus Herzl Gordon (1908–2001), American scholar of Near Eastern cultures and ancient languages
- Cyrus Hamlin (general) (1839–1867), American attorney, politician and Civil War general
- Cyrus Hamlin (missionary) (1811–1900), American Congregational missionary and co-founder of Robert College
- Cyrus Hamlin (professor) (1936–2011), American professor, descendant of the general
- Cy Hungerford (1889–1983), American editorial cartoonist
- Cyrus Kabiru (born 1984), Kenyan visual artist
- Cy Kendall (1898–1953), American actor
- Cyrus B. Lower (1843–1924), American Civil War Medal of Honor recipient
- Cyrus McCormick (1809–1884), American inventor who developed the modern mechanical reaper
- Cyrus Pallonji Mistry (born 1968), Irish-Indian businessman and chairman of Indian conglomerate Tata Group
- Cyrus Mistry (writer) (born 1956), Indian author and playwright
- Reza Cyrus Pahlavi (born 1960), Iranian politician, former Crown Prince of Iran
- Cyrus Patell (born 1961), American literary and cultural critic
- Cyrus Ramone Pattinson (born 1994), British boxer
- Cyrus Peirce (1790–1860), founder of first public normal school (teachers' college) in the United States
- Cyrus Poncha (born 1976), national squash coach in India
- Cyrus S. Poonawalla (fl. 1966–present), Indian businessman
- Cyrus Redding (1785–1870), British journalist and wine writer
- Cyrus Rollocks (born 1998), Canadian soccer player
- Cyrus Sahukar (born 1980), MTV India VJ
- C. R. Smith (1899–1990), longtime CEO of American Airlines
- Cyrus Vance (1917–2002), American politician and lawyer, US Secretary of the Army, Secretary of Defense and Secretary of State]
- Cyrus Vance Jr. (born 1954), American politician, lawyer and former district attorney, son of the above
- Cyrus Villanueva, Australian singer who won The X Factor Australia in 2015

== Fictional characters ==
- Cyrus, from The Revenge of Magic book series by James Riely
- Cyrus Beene, from the television series Scandal
- Cyrus Trask, from John Steinbeck's novel East of Eden
- Cyrus Spitama, the grandson of Zoroaster and main character of Gore Vidal's novel Creation.
- Cyrus Borg, a character in Ninjago
- Cyrus Bortel, from the animated TV series Kim Possible
- Cyrus Goodman, from Andi Mack and Disney Channel's first gay main character
- Cyrus Lupo, a detective from Law & Order
- Cyrus Simpson, the brother of Abraham Simpson in The Simpsons
- Cyrus, from the TV series Trailer Park Boys
- Cyrus, from the animated series Sonic Underground
- Cyrus "The Virus" Grissom, in the 1997 film Con Air, played by John Malkovich
- Cyrus, a gang leader in the 1979 film The Warriors
- Cyrus, the leader of Team Galactic and the main antagonist of Pokémon Diamond, Pearl, and Platinum
- Cyrus Gold, the DC Comics character Solomon Grundy
- Cyrus Smith, the leading character in Jules Verne's novel Mysterious Island
- Cyrus, a vampaneze from the novel The Vampire Prince by Darren Shan
- Cyrus, in the video game Chrono Trigger
- Cyrus, a Redguard pirate and hero in the video game The Elder Scrolls Adventures: Redguard
- Cyrus Albright, one of the eight main protagonists of the video game Octopath Traveler
- Cyrus, an NPC in the video game Genshin Impact
- Cyrus, an alpaca NPC introduced in Animal Crossing: New Leaf

== See also ==
- Persian name
- Syrus (Greek mythology)

== General and cited references ==
- Ghirshman, R. (1965), "A propos de l'ecriture cuneiforme vieux-perse", Journal of Near Eastern Studies, 24 (3): 244–250, doi:10.1086/371818, S2CID 162253058
- Schmitt, Rüdiger (1996a), "Cyrus i. The Name", in Yarshater, Ehsan (ed.), Encyclopaedia Iranica, vol. 6, London: Routledge & Kegan Paul, pp. 515–16
- Schmitt, Rüdiger (1996b), "Cyrus vi. Cyrus the Younger", in Yarshater, Ehsan (ed.), Encyclopaedia Iranica, vol. 6, London: Routledge & Kegan Paul, p. 518
- Tavernier, Jan (2007), Iranica in the Achaemenid Period (ca. 550-330 B.C.): Linguistic Study of Old Iranian Proper Names and Loanwords, Attested in Non-Iranian Texts, Peeters Publishers, ISBN 978-90-429-1833-7
- Tolman, Herbert Cushing (1908), Ancient Persian Lexicon, American Book Company, ISBN 978-0-7905-2613-3
- Gershevitch, Ilya (1985), The Cambridge History of Iran Vol. 2: The Median and Achaemenian periods, Cambridge University Press, ISBN 978-0-521-20091-2
- Harmatta, János (1971), "The Rise of the Old Persian Empire — Cyrus the Great", Acta Antiqua Academiae Scientiarum Hungaricae, 19: 1–15
