= Facebuster =

Takedown move in professional wrestling

^{Superscript text}

A facebuster, also known as a faceplant, is a takedown move in professional wrestling in which an attacking wrestler forces their opponent down to the mat face-first without involving a headlock or facelock (which would instead be a bulldog). A standard facebuster, also known as a jumping facebuster, involves the wrestler grabbing hold of the opponent's head/hair and dropping to their knees, forcing the opponent's face into the mat.

== Variants ==
=== Argentine facebuster ===
The attacking wrestler places an opponent in an Argentine backbreaker rack, where the opponent is held face-up across both the shoulders of the wrestler. From here the wrestler falls sideways (towards the side where the opponent's head is held) while still holding the opponent's head with one arm and flipping the opponent's legs over with the other, driving them down to the mat face-first. WWE wrestler Bianca Belair uses this move and calls it the Kiss of Death (K.O.D).

=== Belly-to-back inverted mat slam ===
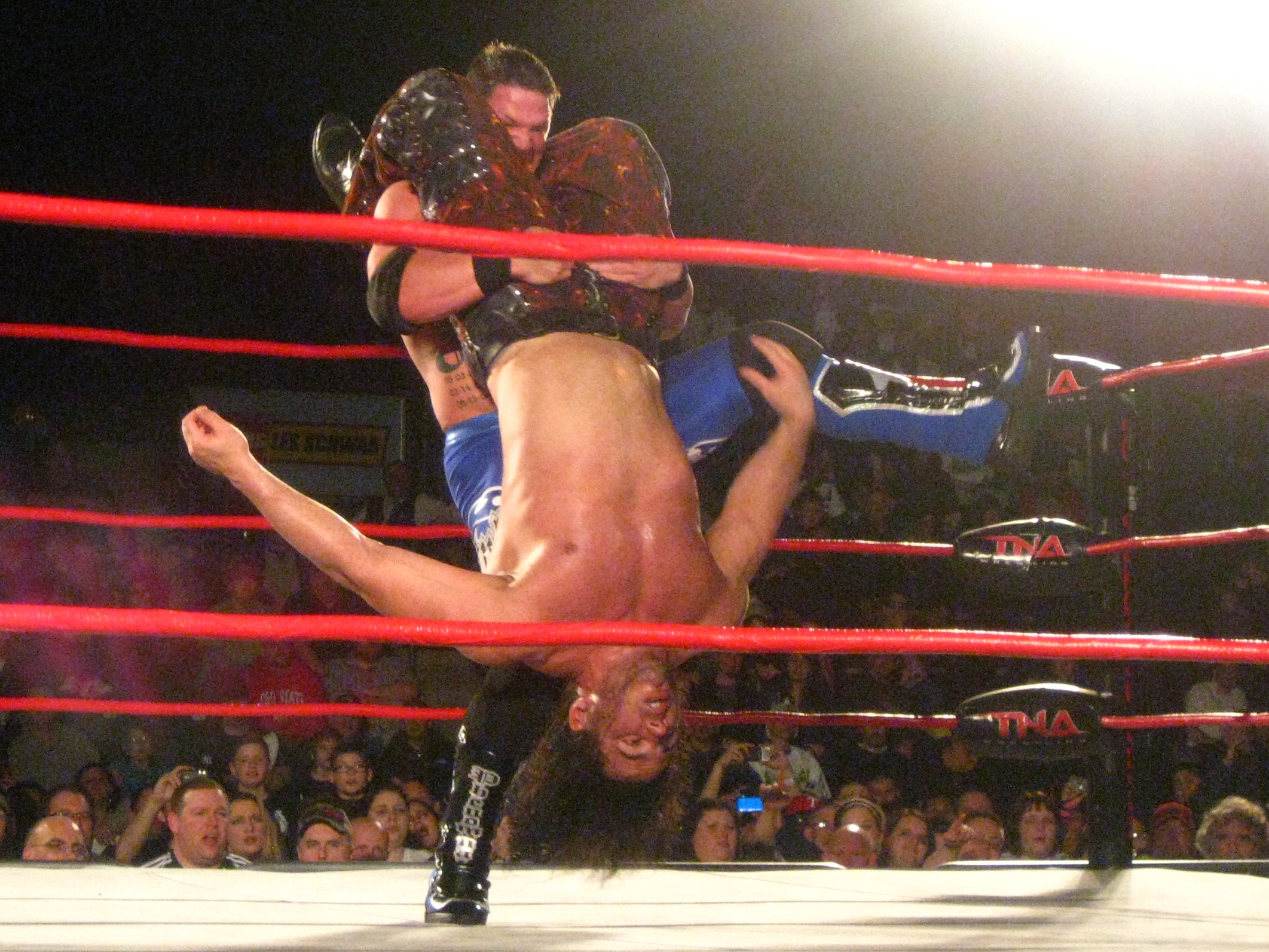
AJ Styles preparing to perform the Styles Clash on Matt Hardy

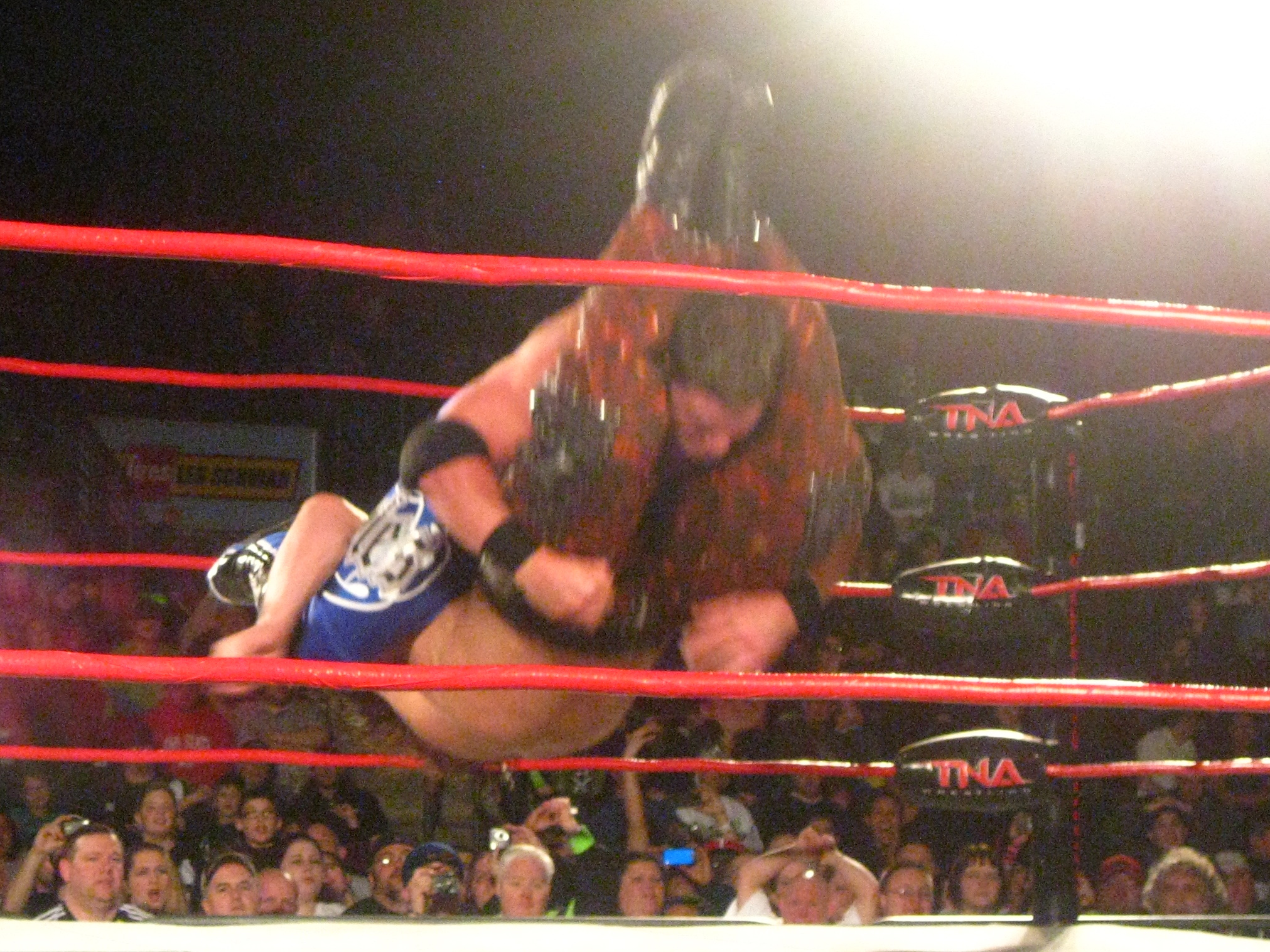
AJ Styles performing the Styles Clash on Matt Hardy

From a position in which the opponent is bent forward against the wrestler's midsection, the wrestler grabs around the opponent's midsection and lifts so that the opponent is held upside down, facing in the same direction as the wrestler. The wrestler then hooks both arms of the opponent using their legs and falls forward, planting the opponent's body into the mat face-first. The move often sees the wrestler keep their legs hooked under the arms of the opponent after hitting the move, using the underhooking technique to turn the opponent on to their back into a Rana style pinning position. This move was innovated by Col. DeBeers and was made famous by Diamond Dallas Page and A.J. Styles, who refers to the move as the Styles Clash. Styles performs the maneuver with a variation, as seen in the photos to the right: he does not hook the opponent's arms before performing the slam but takes two steps and moves his legs in front of the opponent's arms, enabling him to use his legs to cover the shoulders for a pin. Styles has also used this move from the second rope. This variant is later utilized by former WWE wrestler Michelle McCool, who referred to the move as the Faith Breaker. Cesaro uses a variation called the Neutralizer where he grapevines the opponent's leg with his arm similar to a cradle piledriver.

A version of this move also exists which is a Moonsault Styles Clash and was innovated and used by the late indy pro wrestler Brandon Kaplan, and was better known under the names Spyral (or Spiral) and BKNY, which he called the Panther Bomb. He used the move against his opponent against Mike Sydal in an Aerial Assault Match held at CZW Tangled Web 2 in 2009 in which one of the turnbuckle posts has a box mounted on top to allow a diving wrestler extra height for their moves. The initial setup for this move was complicated as it required Mike, while facing the ring, to be placed on top of the box in a sitting position. Brandon would then bend Mike forwards with a front facelock placing Mike's head between his legs, grabbing him around his midsection and then lifted him upside-down with them both facing in the same direction. Brandon then hooked both of Mike's arms his legs and performed a diving moonsault, planting Mike's body into the mat face-first. This move was extremely dangerous since Mike's arms were hooked with Brandon's legs and couldn't brace for the impact, he was knocked unconscious along with giving him a concussion as well as broken ribs, having one of wrist broken, and he had a seizure in the locker room post-match. All of this would put him out of action for 6–8 months. Mike could be heard yelling "No, don't do it!" when he made a last second decision that he didn't want to take the move but felt pressured throughout the process from Brandon, who many at the time felt was going into business for himself. This move was never used again afterwards.

=== Belly-to-back facebuster ===
Like a belly-to-back suplex, the attacking wrestler wraps their arms around the opponent in a waistlock, lifts the opponent in the air, and falls forward into a facebuster. Brooke Tessmacher used this as her finisher and called it the Tess-Shocker.

==== Swinging belly-to-back facebuster ====
The opponent is lifted in sidewinder suplex position before being swung around and driven face first into the mat by the attacker.

=== Diving facebuster ===
This variation sees the wrestler grab a hold over the opponent's head/hair, then climb to the second rope or and finally jump from there dropping to their knees or in a sitout position and planting the opponent face first to the mat. In another variation the wrestler could just jump from the turnbuckle grabbing the opponent's head/hair in the air and planting them to the mat.

=== Double underhook facebuster ===
The wrestler bends their opponent forward, placing the opponent's head between the wrestler's legs, and then applies a double underhook on the opponent. The wrestler performs a kneeling or sitout facebuster. Andre the Giant is credited for inventing the move, but is perhaps better known as the Pedigree, the name Triple H gave to the kneeling version of the move as his finisher. Chyna later adopted the move from Triple H and began using it as a finisher. Another similar version of the Pedigree was used by Seth Rollins, where he would release his opponent during the fall, while a sitout version, known as the In Yo' Face, is the name Velvet Sky gave to the move as her finisher. CM Punk used an avalanche version called the Pepsi Plunge in the independent circuit before re-using the move in AEW and uses the move which can see him drop the opponent towards the mat while facing to or away from the turnbuckle. Chyna also used this version in her feud against Chris Jericho.

==== Inverted double underhook facebuster ====
The wrestler stands behind and facing the same way as their opponent and hooks both their arms. The wrestler then places their head next to the opponent's back and turns 180 degrees while twisting one of the opponent's arms over both of their heads. With the wrestler now in front of the opponent and still hooking the opponent's arms, the wrestler drops onto their back, driving the opponent down face-first into the mat. Innovated by Tommy Rogers as the Tomikaze, it was popularized by Christian, who used this move as a finisher in WWE/TNA; it is perhaps better known as the Killswitch, but he has previously called it the Impaler (1998–1999) and the Unprettier (1999–2009). Juice Robinson uses a jumping variation, calling it Pulp Friction. Candice Michelle used this move and called it Candywrapper. Chelsea Green uses the move as her finisher, calling it the Un-Pretty-Her. Lio Rush uses a variation where he and the opponent spin a full 360°. Tyler Breeze is also among notable wrestlers who use the move and he refers to it as the Unprettier. Grayson Waller does a variation where he performs a somersault.

==== Lifting double underhook facebuster ====
Innovated by Gran Apache, this facebuster is performed when a wrestler bends an opponent forward, placing the opponent's head between the wrestler's legs (a standing head scissors), and hooks each of the opponent's arms behind their back. The wrestler then pulls back on the opponent's arms, lifting them up so that the opponent is held upside-down facing in the same direction as the wrestler, as if the wrestler was preparing for a double underhook piledriver. The wrestler then falls forward to a kneeling position, planting the opponent's body into the mat face-first. A sit-out variation of this move exists and is used by Ricky Starks as a finished called The Buster Keaton/Arms of Orion This maneuver was popularized by Christopher Daniels, who uses a spinning sit-out version of the move and calls it the Angel's Wings and El Desperado as Pinche Locó. Awesome Kong uses a kneeling version as her finisher, known as the Implant Buster. Tommaso Ciampa uses this move, calling it Fairy Tale Ending, while Mandy Rose used a sitout version of the move, known as the Bed of Roses.

=== Electric chair facebuster ===
The wrestler approaches the opponent from behind, and lifts them onto their shoulders into a seated position, the electric chair. The wrestler then lifts the opponent up by their thighs and pushes them forward and down, slamming them down to the mat chest first. The wrestler may also sit down while slamming the opponent. Edge has used the sitout version in his WWF/E run. Used by Rhea Ripley as transition move.

=== Fallaway powerbomb ===
Also commonly referred to as an Alley Oop, this variation sees the wrestler lift up their opponent in a powerbomb position, only to toss them off their shoulders backward, causing them to land face-first. This was used as a signature move by The Big Show.

=== Fireman's carry facebuster ===
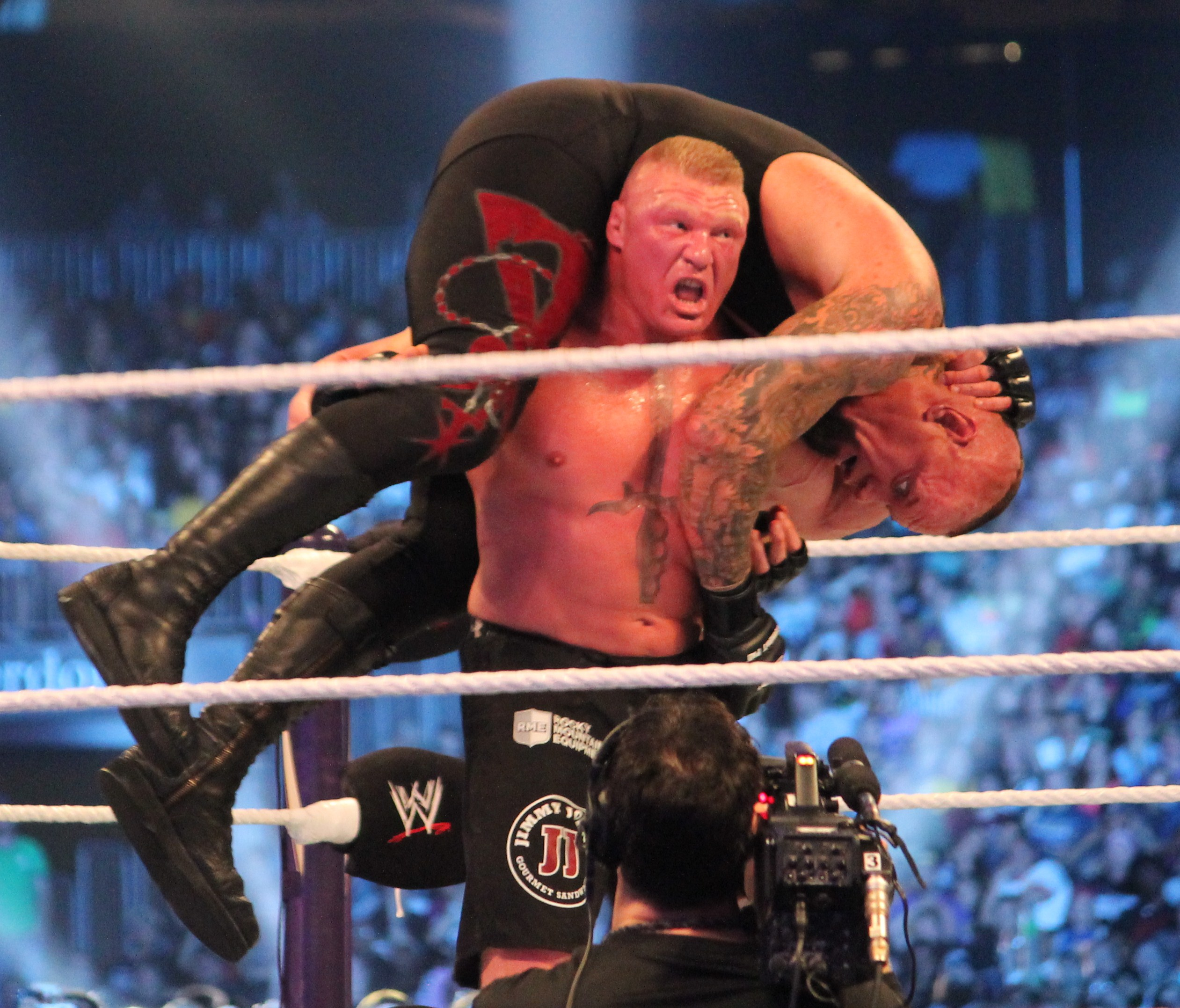
Brock Lesnar preparing to deliver an F-5 to The Undertaker

This facebuster variation sees a wrestler lift an opponent up in a fireman's carry across their shoulders, then throw the opponent's legs out in front of them to spin them out, while simultaneously falling backwards or forwards, causing the opponent to land on their face and upper body. Popularized by Brock Lesnar as the F-5, the move is also currently used by Rosemary as the Red Wedding, by Zaria as the F-6, and by Wardlow as the F-10. Kevin Steen used the move as his signature move in Ring of Honor.

=== Forward Russian legsweep ===
The wrestler grabs the opponent by the arm and goes behind him while holding the arm and hooking the opponent's leg. The wrestler then bends the opponent's back and slams their face to the mat. The forward Russian legsweep was popularized by Jeff Jarrett, who began using the maneuver as a finisher in the late 1990s and calls it The Stroke.

==== Full nelson facebuster ====
A slight variation of the forward Russian legsweep, the wrestler approaches the opponent from behind and places them in a full nelson before hooking their leg. The wrestler then falls forward in an almost identical way, slamming the opponent face-first into the mat. The most notable practitioner of this variant is The Miz, who calls the move the Skull Crushing Finale and has used it as a finisher since August 2009.

=== Front facelock drop ===
The wrestler applies a front facelock to the opponent and then throws their legs out behind them, falling onto their stomach and driving the opponent's face into the mat. It is similar to a standard DDT, except it targets the face of the victim rather than the head, and the wrestler falls onto their stomach instead of falling back as they would in a DDT. A single underhook variation was used by Seth Rollins.

=== Gory bomb ===
This back-to-back release facebuster is a variation of the Gory special where a wrestler releases the arms of the opponent to take hold of the opponent's legs while dropping to a seated position, forcing the opponent to fall forward and impact the mat face-first. The move is named after the innovator of the original Gory special, Gory Guerrero. Chavo Guerrero utilized this move. WWE wrestler Kay Lee Ray uses this move as the KLR Bomb, now known as the Fyre Bomb ever since going under the ring name Alba Fyre. NJPW wrestler Shingo Takagi uses it as Noshigami.

=== Inverted double leg slam ===
Also known as an inverted Alabama Slam, this move usually starts with the opponent sitting on an elevated position such as the top turnbuckle, with the attacking wrestler, standing in front of them and facing the same direction, positioning the opponent's legs over their shoulders. Then the attacking wrestler detaches from the turnbuckle, so that the opponent is held upside down in a back-to-back position. From this position the attacking wrestler bends over, flipping the opponent over their head and slamming them down to the mat face-first. The attacking wrestler may also sit down while slamming the opponent. Drew McIntyre currently uses this moves as a transitional move. Hall of Famer Nikki Bella uses this move as a signature move.

=== Inverted swinging facebuster ===
This version of a facebuster sees the wrestler place an opponent in an inverted facelock while holding the facelock, twisting them into the facebuster and landing with their legs spread apart, driving the opponent's face into the mat. Velvet Sky used a variation of this move. She begins with her opponent in an inverted facelock, then grabs one of the opponents arms and pulls, rotating the opponent so that the front of the body faces the mat and is in between her legs, finally driving down to the mat and ending in a facebuster.

=== Kneeling facebuster ===
The wrestler grabs the opponent by the head or hair and jumps in the air, landing in a kneeling position and driving the opponent's face into the mat. A slight variation of the kneeling facebuster sees a wrestler fall into the kneeling position while having the opponent's head between their legs and pushing the opponent down with their hands. Dustin Rhodes used the move in his Black Reign persona called the Blackout. Cameron used it in her WWE career. Ivory used this as her finisher interchangeably with the sit out version, calling them both Poison Ivory.

=== Over the shoulder facebuster ===
Also known as a powerslam facebuster, this variation sees the wrestler lifting the opponent onto their shoulders as in a front powerslam. Then as the opponent is on the shoulder, the wrestler jumps and slams the opponent face-first to the mat. A cutter variation also exists. WWE wrestler Big E uses this move as a finisher, calling it the Big Ending.

=== Ura-Shouten ===
The wrestler lifts their opponent into a Gutwrench Canadian Backbreaker Rack and transitions it into a Swinging Side-slam Face-buster. Innovated and popularized by Hirooki Goto.

=== Powerbomb facebuster ===
This variation of the facebuster sees the wrestler seating the opponent over their own shoulders, as in a powerbomb. From this point, the wrestler pushes the opponent off their shoulders, grabs the opponent's head with both hands, and drops seated or kneeled to hit a sitout or kneeling facebuster.

=== Push-up facebuster ===
A variation where a wrestler puts the opponent's between their legs as they performs push-ups, causing the opponent's face to be slammed into the canvas a number of times. Often instead of straight push ups, the attacking wrestler just bounces their legs up and down to create the effect. Alex Shelley, Madison Rayne, and Stephanie Vaquer use this as one of their signature moves, the latter calling the move The Devil's Kiss.

=== Reverse chokeslam facebuster ===
The attacking wrestler grabs hold of an opponent's neck with both hands, one on the front, and one on the back. The arm that has the hand on the back of the neck may hook the opponent's arm. The wrestler then lifts the opponent up, releases the hand holding the front of the opponent's neck, and pushes forward to slam the opponent to the mat face-first with the other hand. Braun Strowman occasionally uses this move as his finisher. Former NXT Rookie Eli Cottonwood used this as a finisher.

A wrestler pushes their opponent upward by reaching under their legs and lifting them into the air. While retaining the hold on the opponent's leg, the wrestler falls backwards, dropping the opponent front-first into the canvas. It is commonly used when an opponent is charging. The move is similar to a back body drop, but the wrestler pushes upwards so that their opponent falls on to their face instead of falling back-first.

=== Shoulder facebuster ===
Also known as a hangman's facebuster or cravate facebuster, this facebuster is performed when an attacking wrestler, who is standing in a back-to-back position with an opponent, reaches back to pull the opponent's head over their shoulder before (while keeping a hold of the opponent's head) falling forwards to twist the opponent's head over so they slam face first into the mat. This move was the finisher of Curtis Axel, which he called the Axehole.

=== Sitout facebuster ===
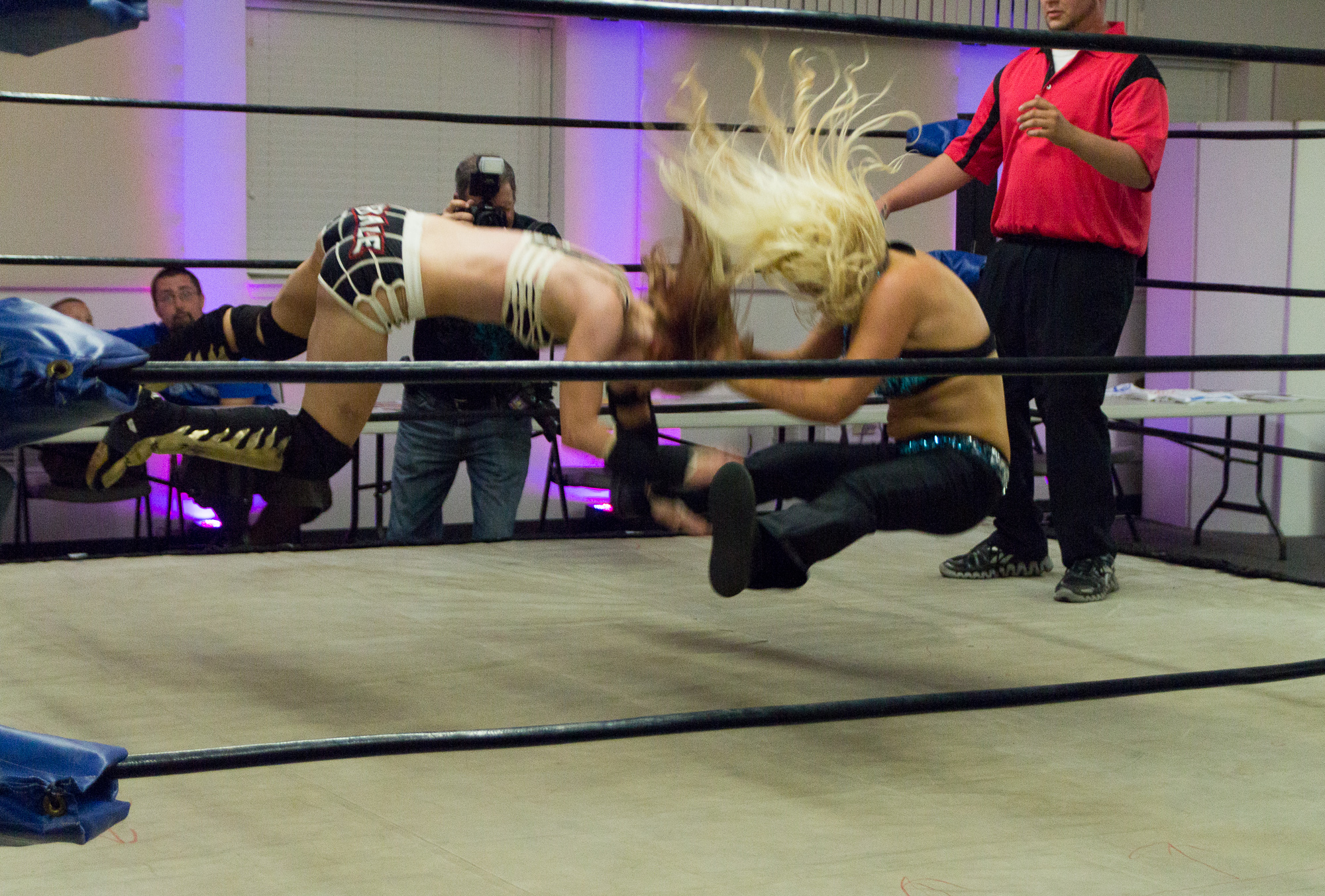
Jillian Hall performing Solo (sitout facebuster) on Xandra Bale

This is the most common variation of the standard facebuster in which the attacker grabs hold of the opponent by their head then jumps in the air, lifting the opponent and landing with their legs spread apart, driving the opponent's face into the mat. Another variation of this move is to grab the opponent by the hair, perform the same jump and landing but lift only the opponent's head, giving a harder effect when the opponent's face is driven into the mat. This was popularized by Sean Waltman and The Bella Twins, dubbed the X-Factor and the Bella Buster respectively. Billy Kidman would utilize the move to counter an opponent's powerbomb attempt. Iyo Sky also uses the move.

Other wrestlers who've used this move and popularized it were Torrie Wilson, calling it the Nose-Job, Jazz, calling it the Jazz Stinger, Ivory, calling it Poison Ivory, Carmella, calling it the Mella Buster, and Jillian Hall, calling it Solo. The move would also be used by Kelly Kelly, Gail Kim, Layla, Dawn Marie, Lexie Fyfe, Lana, and Brooke Tessemacher.

==== Vietnam Driver II ====
The attacking wrestler lifts their opponent into a Canadian backbreaker rack, also known as the overhead gutwrench backbreaker rack, and transitions it into a sitout facebuster. Popularized by Daisuke Sasaki.

=== Spinning facebuster ===
Also known as a swinging facebuster, this variation sees the attacker grabbing hold of the opponent by their hair and then spinning in the air, landing in a kneeling position and driving the opponent's face into the mat. This maneuver was popularized by Melina. It's also used by Shotzi Blackheart as a setup for her signature or finisher and Liv Morgan, who calls it Blueface.

=== Vertical suplex facebuster ===
Also called a front suplex or a gourdbuster, this move sees attacker apply a front facelock to the opponent and drape the opponent's near arm over their shoulder. The attacker lifts the opponent into a vertical position, then falls forward, driving the opponent's face into the ground. Invented by Arn Anderson, while Jeff Hardy used a sitout version.

=== Wheelbarrow facebuster ===
This facebuster sees the attacking wrestler grab a standing opponent around the waist from behind and lift them into a backdrop position before then falling to a sitting position, swinging the opponent down so that their face is driven into the ground. A variant, sees the wrestler lift the opponent's legs around their waist before placing both hands around the opponent's waist and lifting them into a wheelbarrow position. The wrestler then elevates their opponent into the air before performing a seated drop, driving their opponent's face into the canvas. Matt Jackson uses this move, dubbed the Worst Case Scenario.

==== Belly-to-back wheelbarrow facebuster ====
A variation to the wheelbarrow facebuster which sees the attacking wrestler stand at the side of an opponent and begin to lift them as for a belly-to-back suplex. Instead of falling backwards to drop the opponent back-first, the wrestler stops after lifting the opponent, grabs a hold of their legs while still holding the opponent up, and slams them face-first on to the mat. Jushin Thunder Liger is well known for using this move as a finisher, calling it the Crash Thunder Buster.

==== Chickenwing facebuster ====
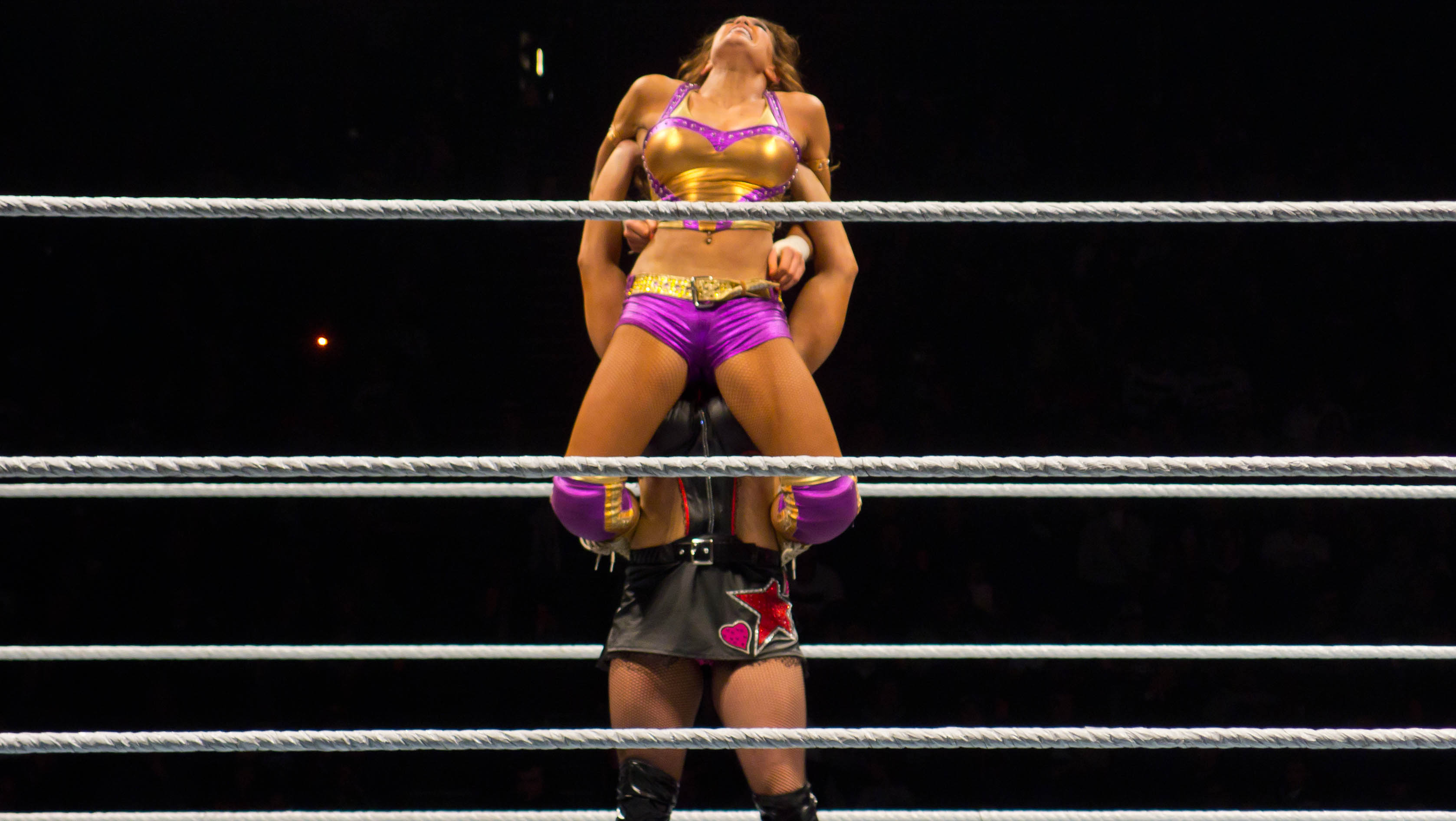
Beth Phoenix performing Glam Slam on Eve Torres

The wrestler hooks both an opponent's arms in an elevated double chickenwing, lifts them up into the air from behind, then drops the opponent down onto the mat face first. There is also a sitout variation, where a wrestler hooks their opponent's legs and drops to a seated position, while planting the opponent's face into the canvas between the wrestler's legs. This was popularized by Beth Phoenix, who calls it the Glam Slam. The move was only ever been kicked out of once by Natalya a month before Phoenix's departure from WWE. Jon Moxley used this during the indies in the 2000s as the Hook and Ladder before signing with WWE in 2011. NJPW wrestler Ryusuke Taguchi used this move called the Dodon. Taya Valkyrie also used this move as a finisher dubbed Road To Valhalla. Jade Cargill currently uses this as the Jaded. TJP also utilized the move but instead dropped his opponent onto his knees.

== See also ==
- Professional wrestling throws
