= My Giant Life =

American reality television series

- Genre: Reality television
- Starring: Colleen "Coco" Smith; Haleigh Hampton; Nancy Mulkey; Lindsay Kay Hayward; Katja Bavendam; Alicia Jay; Lexie Crist
- Country of origin: United States
- Original language: English
- No. of seasons: 3
- No. of episodes: 22

Production
- Running time: 42 minutes
- Production company: Workaholic Productions

Original release
- Network: TLC
- Release: July 14, 2015 – November 5, 2017

My Giant Life is an American reality television series that premiered on the TLC cable network, on July 14, 2015. Season 1 of the series revolved around 4 women who are taller than 6 feet 6 inches (198 cm). Season 2 follows three of the four women from the first season, with Nancy Mulkey replaced by a new woman, 6 ft 9 in (206 cm) German-born New Yorker Katja, and her 5 ft 2 in (157 cm) American wife.

== Episodes ==
=== Series overview ===
Season	Episodes	Originally released	
Season	Episodes	First released	Last released
1	6	July 14, 2015	August 18, 2015
2	8	June 7, 2016	July 26, 2016
3	8	September 17, 2017	November 5, 2017

=== Season 1 (2015) ===
No. in season	Title	Original release date	U.S. viewers (millions)
1	"A Family of Giants"	July 14, 2015	1.682
2	"The Tallest Girl in Texas"	July 21, 2015	1.474
3	"My Giant Life"	July 28, 2015	1.441
4	"We All Have Our Uniqueness"	August 4, 2015	1.416
5	"The Shortest One in the House"	August 11, 2015	1.428
6	"Big Updates"	August 18, 2015	0.987

=== Season 2 (2016) ===
No. in season	Title	Original release date	U.S. viewers (millions)
1	"The Year of Lindsay"	June 7, 2016	0.981
2	"Big Girl in a Tiny Chair"	June 14, 2016	0.828
3	"Tall Freak"	June 21, 2016	0.884
4	"The Tallest Patient"	June 28, 2016	1.003
5	"Lindsay Takes Over The World"	July 5, 2016	1.006
6	"Tissues for Your Issues"	July 12, 2016	1.011
7	"In Love With a Tall Woman"	July 19, 2016	1.019
8	"United States of Lindsay"	July 26, 2016	1.212

=== Season 3 (2017) ===
No. in season	Title	Original release date	U.S. viewers (millions)
1	"My Giant Baby"	September 18, 2017	N/A
2	"Variety in All Sizes"	September 25, 2017	N/A
3	"Abnormally Tall"	October 2, 2017	N/A
4	"Tall Jokes"	October 9, 2017	N/A
5	"Going Bigger"	October 16, 2017	N/A
6	"No Ships Like Friendships"	October 23, 2017	N/A
7	"Legit 7 Footer"	October 30, 2017	N/A
8	"Shortest to Tallest"	November 6, 2017	N/A

== Broadcast ==
Internationally, the series premiered in Australia on October 6, 2015, on TLC.
