= WWE NXT seasons 1–5 =

WWE NXT initially debuted in 2010 as a seasonal show which was presented as a hybrid between WWE's scripted live event shows and reality television, in which talent from WWE's developmental territory Florida Championship Wrestling (FCW) participated in a competition to become WWE's next "breakout star", with the help of mentors from WWE's Raw and SmackDown brands. Five seasons of this iteration were broadcast, with Wade Barrett, Kaval, Kaitlyn, and Johnny Curtis being announced as winners, and the last season ending without a resolution.

== Season 1 ==
Season 1
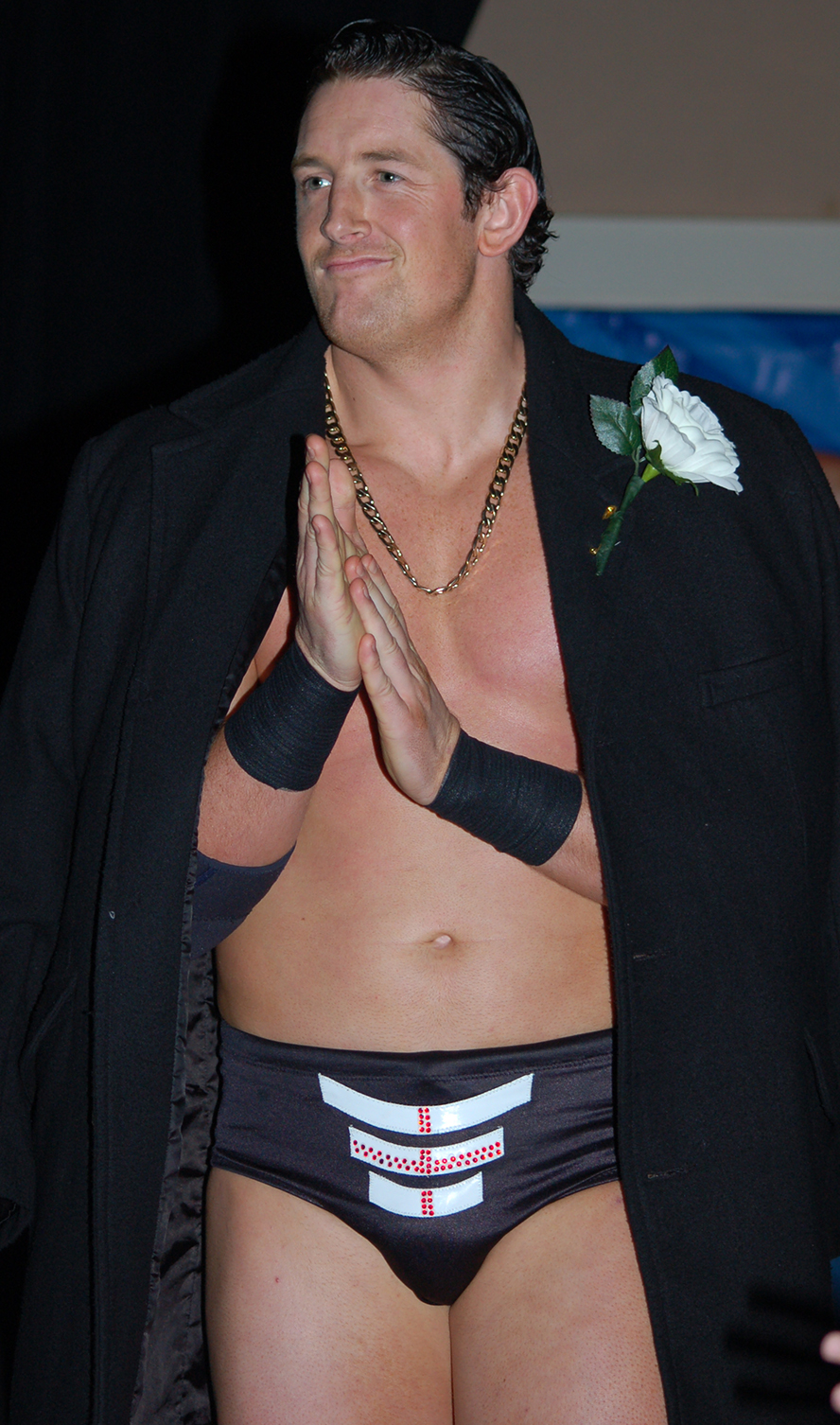
- Hosted by: Matt Striker
- Winner: Wade Barrett
- Winning mentor: Chris Jericho
- Runner-up: David Otunga
- No. of episodes: 15

Release
- Original network: Syfy
- Original release: February 23 – June 1, 2010

The first season of NXT began airing on Syfy on February 23, 2010, and ended on June 1, 2010. The majority of the season one cast was revealed a week before the premiere on the series finale of ECW. However, before the season's premiere aired Skip Sheffield's Pro was changed with William Regal replacing the announced Montel Vontavious Porter (MVP). Near the end of the season, several changes were made to the original plan of the format. The season was shortened from the planned 17 episodes to 15 episodes. In the first elimination episode that aired on May 11, both Daniel Bryan and Michael Tarver were eliminated by WWE management and removed from that night's Pros' Poll after both made comments about wanting to be voted off. The show ended with three eliminations, with Sheffield ranked last in the Poll. Carlito was released on May 21 for refusing rehab after violating WWE's Wellness Program. Subsequent Pros' Polls were held without him for the rest of the season. The winner of season one was Wade Barrett. Immediately after the conclusion of season one, the Rookies were used in a storyline that had them forming an alliance called The Nexus. Led by Barrett, the group invaded the June 7, 2010 episode of Raw following the conclusion of season one in an attempt to gain WWE contracts for the losers of NXT. The invasion consisted of the group attacking John Cena as well as other wrestlers and WWE personnel. Barrett announced that he would invoke his title shot at Night of Champions for the WWE Championship in a six-pack elimination challenge. At Night of Champions on September 19, Barrett lost in his title match to Randy Orton.

=== Contestants ===
Rookie	Pro	Wins	Losses	Status
Wade Barrett	Chris Jericho	8	5	Winner
David Otunga	R-Truth	6	5	Eliminated (Week 15)
Justin Gabriel	Matt Hardy	7	4	Eliminated (Week 15)
Heath Slater	Christian	5	6	Eliminated (Week 14)
Darren Young	CM Punk	7	4	Eliminated (Week 13)
Skip Sheffield	William Regal	2	5	Eliminated (Week 12)
Michael Tarver	Carlito	1	7	Eliminated (Week 12)
Daniel Bryan	The Miz	0	10	Eliminated (Week 12)

=== Poll results ===
– Winner of competition
– Safe in competition
– Eliminated from competition by Pros' Poll
– Eliminated from competition by WWE management
– Won immunity prior to that particular poll and is ineligible to be eliminated

Rookie	Week 6 (March 30)	Week 12 (May 11)	Week 13 (May 18)	Week 14 (May 25)	Week 15 (June 1) Round 1	Week 15 (June 1) Round 2
Wade Barrett	2nd	1st	1st	1st	1st	1st
David Otunga	5th	2nd	2nd	2nd	2nd	2nd
Justin Gabriel	3rd	3rd	4th	3rd	3rd	
Heath Slater	4th	4th	3rd	4th		
Darren Young	8th	5th	5th			
Skip Sheffield	6th	6th				
Michael Tarver	7th	Eliminated by management				
Daniel Bryan	1st	Eliminated by management				
Eliminated	N/A	Tarver, Bryan and Sheffield	Young	Slater	Gabriel	Otunga

== Season 2 ==
Season 2
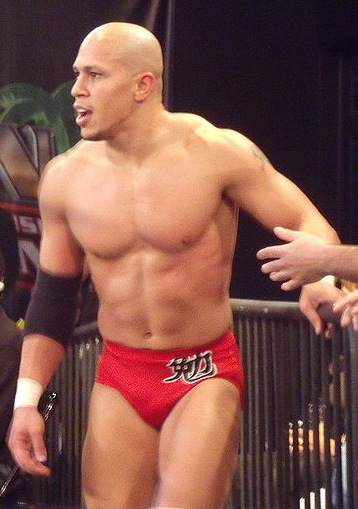
- Hosted by: Matt Striker; Ashley Valence (June 22 – August 31, 2010)
- Winner: Kaval
- Winning mentor: LayCool (Layla and Michelle McCool)
- Runner-up: Michael McGillicutty
- No. of episodes: 13

Release
- Original network: Syfy
- Original release: June 8 – August 31, 2010

The second season of NXT started on June 8, 2010, and ended on August 31, 2010. The season 2 cast was revealed on the first season finale on June 1. The season was originally planned to last 12 weeks. However, it was later extended to 13 weeks. In this season, the polls were different as rankings were based half on Pro votes and half on votes from fans via WWE's official website. The first poll was shown on July 6. Originally, the polls format was set to match the previous season, with a non-elimination poll followed by weekly elimination polls on July 27. However, the first poll was made a surprise elimination round on the night with a second elimination poll held on August 3 instead. In addition, a double elimination stipulation was added to the fourth NXT poll on August 17. The winner of the season was Kaval. Along with Kaval, Alex Riley was immediately promoted to aid his Pro The Miz on the Raw brand. On November 21, Kaval invoked his title shot at Survivor Series for the Intercontinental Championship against the reigning champion Dolph Ziggler, but he was defeated. Kaval was released from his contract in December 2010.

=== Contestants ===
Rookie	Pro(s)	Wins	Losses	Status
Kaval	LayCool (Layla and Michelle McCool)	3	6	Winner
Michael McGillicutty	Kofi Kingston	6	4	Eliminated (Week 13)
Alex Riley	The Miz	5	4	Eliminated (Week 13)
Husky Harris	Cody Rhodes	4	4	Eliminated (Week 11)
Percy Watson	Montel Vontavious Porter	3	4	Eliminated (Week 11)
Lucky Cannon	Mark Henry	3	5	Eliminated (Week 10)
Eli Cottonwood	John Morrison	2	2	Eliminated (Week 8)
Titus O'Neil	Zack Ryder	0	3	Eliminated (Week 4)

=== Poll results ===
– Winner of competition
– Safe in competition
– Eliminated from competition by NXT Poll
– Won immunity prior to that particular poll and is ineligible to be eliminated

Rookie	Week 4 (June 29)	Week 8 (July 27)	Week 10 (August 10)	Week 11 (August 17)	Week 13 (August 31)
Kaval	1st	2nd	1st	Safe	1st
Michael McGillicutty	3rd	1st	2nd	Safe	2nd
Alex Riley	4th	3rd	5th	Safe	3rd
Husky Harris	7th	6th	4th	4th	
Percy Watson	2nd	4th	3rd	5th	
Lucky Cannon	5th	5th	6th		
Eli Cottonwood	6th	7th			
Titus O'Neil	8th				
Eliminated	O'Neil	Cottonwood	Cannon	Watson and Harris	Riley and McGillicutty

== Season 3 ==
Season 3
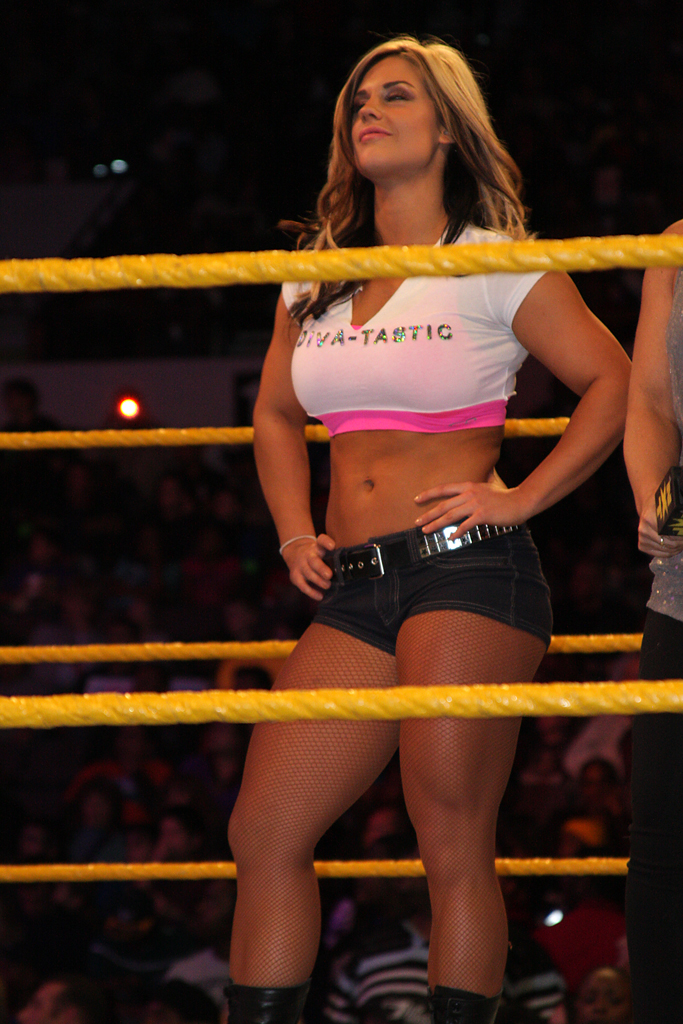
- Hosted by: Matt Striker
- Winner: Kaitlyn
- Winning mentor: Vickie Guerrero
- Runner-up: Naomi
- No. of episodes: 13

Release
- Original network: Syfy (September 7 – September 28, 2010); Webcast (October 5 – November 30, 2010)
- Original release: September 7 – November 30, 2010

The third season of NXT started on September 7, 2010, and ended on November 30, 2010. The season was exclusive to female wrestlers and was the second different contest produced by WWE to find new female wrestlers, the first being the Divas Searches held from 2003 to 2007. The first four episodes of season three were aired on Syfy. Due to the debut of SmackDown on Syfy on October 1, NXT left the channel and became a webcast at WWE.com for visitors from the United States from October 5 onwards. A new interactive website for NXT was also launched at the beginning of the season to accommodate the move. The reward to the victor was changed in contrast to the previous seasons. Unlike the first two male victors, the female victor of season three would not get a shot at a title of her choice (the only title being the Divas Championship), but rather a WWE contract. Other changes in the third season include a greater emphasis on challenges for the first three polls where the winner of the most challenges before the next upcoming poll would be awarded immunity. The first elimination poll took place five weeks into the competition. The majority of the season three cast was revealed on the second-season finale on August 31. However, before the season's premiere aired prospective rookie wrestler Aloisia was dropped from the show. On screen, Aloisia's exit stemmed from an argument between Aloisia and her Pro Vickie Guerrero, forcing Guerrero to fire her. In reality, it was reported that Aloisia was allegedly dropped from the show after pornographic photos of her were leaked onto the Internet. However, in an interview Aloisia herself was unsure whether this was the reason for her exit or not. Guerrero later revealed her new rookie in the season three premiere to be Kaitlyn, who would ultimately win the season.

The season was known for its often poor quality, a fact that Michael Cole and Josh Matthews often made fun of with humorous banter. Until a quitting angle took him off commentary for most of episode 3 a large gong was situated next to Cole, who would strike it whenever something about the show bothered him. It was removed upon his return.

=== Contestants ===
Rookie	Pro(s)	Wins	Losses	Status
Kaitlyn	Vickie Guerrero	3	4	Winner
Naomi	Kelly Kelly	5	4	Eliminated (Week 13)
AJ	Primo	6	2	Eliminated (Week 12)
Aksana	Goldust	2	5	Eliminated (Week 11)
Maxine	Alicia Fox	1	4	Eliminated (Week 9)
Jamie	The Bella Twins (Brie and Nikki Bella)	2	0	Eliminated (Week 5)

=== Poll results ===
– Winner of competition
– Safe in competition
– Eliminated from competition by NXT Poll
– Won immunity prior to that particular poll and is ineligible to be eliminated

Rookie	Week 5 (October 5)	Week 9 (November 2)	Week 11 (November 16)	Week 12 (November 23)	Week 13 (November 30)
Kaitlyn	Immune (3 challenge wins)^{1}	Safe (2 challenge wins)	Safe (1 challenge win)	Safe	Winner
Naomi	Safe (2 challenge wins)	Immune (3 challenge wins)	Safe (1 challenge win)	Safe	Eliminated
AJ	Safe (3 challenge wins)	Safe (2 challenge wins)	Immune (2 challenge wins)	Eliminated	
Aksana	Safe (1 challenge win)	Safe (0 challenge wins)	Eliminated (0 challenge wins)		
Maxine	Safe (0 challenge wins)	Eliminated (1 challenge win)			
Jamie	Eliminated (1 challenge win)				

^{1} As the result of a tie break between AJ and Kaitlyn before the poll, Kaitlyn won immunity through a crowd reaction vote.

== Season 4 ==
Season 4
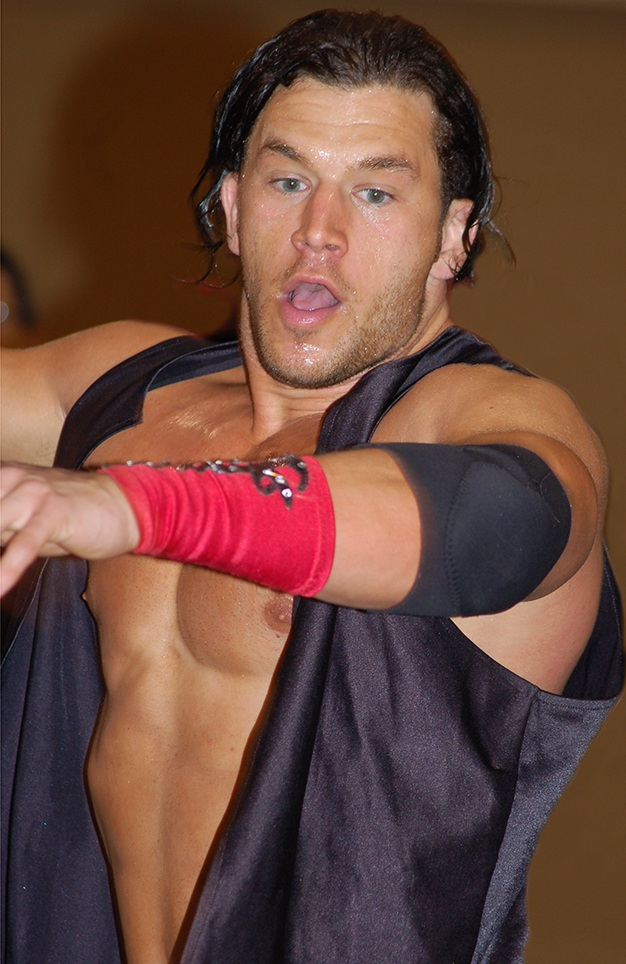
- Hosted by: Matt Striker
- Winner: Johnny Curtis
- Winning mentor: R-Truth
- Runner-up: Brodus Clay
- No. of episodes: 13

Release
- Original network: Webcast
- Original release: December 7, 2010 – March 1, 2011

The fourth season of NXT started on December 7, 2010, and ended on March 1, 2011. Returning to the male-orientated format of the first two seasons, the season four cast was revealed on the third-season finale on November 30. In a change from the third season, "immunity points" were now rewarded to the winner of each challenge, which vary depending on the challenge's difficulty. The person with the most points before the next upcoming poll is then awarded immunity from that poll. On the January 4, episode of NXT, it was announced that the winner would earn a WWE Tag Team Championship match with their respective Pro as their partner. That same night, Dolph Ziggler won a battle royal consisting of each of the Pros and as a result was able to trade off his Rookie Jacob Novak for Byron Saxton, who was originally mentored by Chris Masters. Similarly on the February 1 episode of NXT, a fatal four-way elimination match was held between the remaining four Rookies. Brodus Clay won and as a result was able to trade off his Pros The Million Dollar Couple (Ted DiBiase and Maryse) for Alberto Del Rio, who was originally mentoring Conor O'Brian before O'Brian's elimination on January 25. The winner of the season was Johnny Curtis, earning himself and his Pro R-Truth a shot at the tag team titles. On April 18, R-Truth turned into a villain by attacking John Morrison and subsequently R-Truth and Curtis never invoked their shot at the titles. Curtis would eventually debut on the main roster in June when he stated that he would not be challenging for the tag team titles with R-Truth and instead used his title shot with season two runner-up Michael McGillicutty on the October 11, 2012 episode of NXT against Team Hell No for the WWE Tag Team Championship, but was defeated.

=== Contestants ===
Rookie	Final Pro(s)	Initial Pro(s)	Wins	Losses	Status
Johnny Curtis		R-Truth	3	7	Winner
Brodus Clay	Alberto Del Rio and Ricardo Rodriguez	Ted DiBiase Jr. and Maryse	7	3	Eliminated (Week 13)
Derrick Bateman		Daniel Bryan	3	6	Eliminated (Week 12)
Byron Saxton	Dolph Ziggler and Vickie Guerrero	Chris Masters	3	6	Eliminated (Week 10)
Conor O'Brian	Ted DiBiase Jr. and Maryse	Alberto Del Rio and Ricardo Rodriguez	3	1	Eliminated (Week 7)
Jacob Novak	Chris Masters	Dolph Ziggler and Vickie Guerrero	1	2	Eliminated (Week 5)

=== Poll results ===
– Winner of competition
– Safe in competition
– Eliminated from competition by NXT Poll
– Won immunity prior to that particular poll and is ineligible to be eliminated

Rookie	Week 5 (January 4)	Week 7 (January 18)	Week 10 (February 8)	Week 12 (February 22)	Week 13 (March 1)
Johnny Curtis	Immune (5 immunity points)	Safe (0 immunity points)	Immune (3 immunity points)^{1}	Safe (3 immunity points)	Winner
Brodus Clay	Safe (0 immunity points)	Safe (0 immunity points)	Safe (3 immunity points)	Immune (8 immunity points)	Eliminated
Derrick Bateman	Safe (3 immunity points)	Immune (8 immunity points)	Safe (2 immunity points)	Eliminated (0 immunity points)	
Byron Saxton	Safe (1 immunity point)	Safe (0 immunity points)	Eliminated (2 immunity points)		
Conor O'Brian	Safe (4 immunity points)	Eliminated (0 immunity points)			
Jacob Novak	Eliminated (1 immunity point)				

^{1} As the result of a tie break between Brodus Clay and Johnny Curtis before the poll, Curtis won immunity through a crowd reaction vote.

== NXT Redemption (season 5) ==
NXT Redemption
- Hosted by: Matt Striker; Maryse (March 8 – August 20, 2011)
- No. of episodes: 67

Release
- Original network: Webcast
- Original release: March 8, 2011 – June 13, 2012

NXT Redemption, the fifth season of NXT, started on March 8, 2011. The season consisted of seven rookies chosen from the previous male-only seasons and initially followed a similar format to the previous four seasons, with the winner of season 5 stated to win a spot in the planned sixth season of NXT alongside a WWE pro of their choice. No eliminations took place for the first 10 weeks of the show and following the elimination of Conor O'Brian after 17 weeks Derrick Bateman replaced him as a new Rookie contestant. The show's competition format was then gradually and quietly forgotten about (although it was never officially dropped), the Pros ceased to appear and NXT Redemption subsequently morphed into its own entity, featuring self-contained storylines and matches involving long-tenured lower-card performers such as Tyson Kidd, Maxine, Yoshi Tatsu, JTG, Trent Baretta, Kaitlyn, Johnny Curtis, Percy Watson, Tyler Reks, AJ Lee, Curt Hawkins and Michael McGillicutty, among others. After 59 weeks, Darren Young and Titus O'Neil were moved to the SmackDown roster on April 18, 2012, leaving Bateman as the sole remaining Rookie on the show, though he was not declared the winner and new episodes continued to be taped until June 12. The final episode of NXT Redemption aired on June 13, after which the show ended with no definitive conclusion, with a "new NXT" advertised for the following week. In total, NXT Redemption ran for over a year and 67 episodes were produced, exceeding the total number of episodes for all previous seasons combined. The first season was a distant second at 15 episodes.

=== Contestants ===
Rookie	Pro	Past season	Wins	Losses	Status
Derrick Bateman	Daniel Bryan	Season 4	12	14	Never eliminated
Darren Young	Chavo Guerrero	Season 1	18	21	Never eliminated; moved to SmackDown
Titus O'Neil	Hornswoggle	Season 2	25	18	Never eliminated; moved to SmackDown
Conor O'Brian	Vladimir Kozlov	Season 4	6	6	Eliminated (Week 17)
Lucky Cannon	Tyson Kidd	Season 2	6	6	Eliminated (Week 15)
Byron Saxton	Yoshi Tatsu	Season 4	2	8	Eliminated (Week 13)
Jacob Novak	JTG	Season 4	2	5	Eliminated (Week 11)

=== Poll results ===
Rookie	Week 11 (May 17)	Week 13 (May 31)	Week 15 (June 14)	Week 17 (June 28)	Week 29 (October 5)	Week 35 (November 16)	Week 59 (April 18)
Derrick Bateman				Joined	Safe (0 points)	Safe (0 points)	Never eliminated (0 points)
Titus O'Neil	Safe (19 points)	Safe (19 points)	Safe (22 points)	Safe (22 points)	Safe (30 points)	Safe (45 points)	Never eliminated; moved to SmackDown (45 points)
Darren Young	Safe (7 points)	Safe (7 points)	Safe (7 points)	Safe (7 points)	Suspended (7 points)	Returned from suspension (7 points)	Never eliminated; moved to SmackDown (7 points)
Conor O'Brian	Safe (0 points)	Safe (3 points)	Safe (3 points)	Eliminated (3 points)			
Lucky Cannon	Safe (0 points)	Safe (0 points)	Eliminated (0 points)				
Byron Saxton	Safe (4 points)	Eliminated (4 points)					
Jacob Novak	Eliminated (6 points)						

== Season 6 cancellation ==
In May and June 2017, WWE published an article and a video detailing a planned and subsequently cancelled season of NXT in July 2012 which was to feature Big E Langston, Bo Dallas, Damien Sandow, Jinder Mahal, Hunico, Leo Kruger, Seth Rollins and Xavier Woods.

== See also ==
- WWE LFG
