= R100 (film) =

2013 film by Hitoshi Matsumoto

- Film poster
- Directed by: Hitoshi Matsumoto
- Screenplay by: Hitoshi Matsumoto; Mitsuyoshi Takasu; Tomoji Hasegawa; Kōji Ema; Mitsuru Kuramoto
- Produced by: Keisuke Konishi; Natsue Takemoto
- Starring: Nao Ōmori; Shinobu Terajima; Hitoshi Matsumoto; Ai Tominaga; Eriko Sato
- Cinematography: Kazunari Tanaka
- Edited by: Yoshitaka Honda
- Music by: Shūichi Sakamoto; Shūichirō Toki
- Production companies: Warner Bros. Pictures; Phantom Film; Yoshimoto Kogyo Company
- Distributed by: Drafthouse Films (US); Warner Bros. Pictures (Japan)
- Release dates: September 12, 2013 (TIFF); October 5, 2013 (Japan); December 12, 2014 (United States)
- Running time: 94 minutes
- Country: Japan
- Language: Japanese

R100 is a Japanese dramedy film directed by Hitoshi Matsumoto. The film had its world premiere at 2013 Toronto International Film Festival on September 12, 2013.

== Plot ==
Ordinary furniture salesman Takafumi Katayama enters a year-long, non-cancellable contract with a BDSM club. Multiple dominatrices, each with their own specialty skill, attack and humiliate Takafumi in a variety of public settings and situations, during which he enters a trance-like euphoric state. Between these encounters, Takafumi cares for his young son Arashi while his wife, Setsuko, is comatose.

While using the restroom at work one day, Takafumi is approached by a dominatrix who begins whipping him. He begs her to stop, announcing his intent to cancel his membership, but she is undeterred. A customer later reveals that he knows of Takafumi's involvement in the club, warning that Takafumi's family will soon become endangered if he does not quit. At home, Takafumi finds a doll of a naked man in shibari, which Arashi claims one of the dominatrices gave him. Takafumi phones the club president, demands that they leave Arashi alone, and inquires about the man who confronted him at work, though the president claims not to know what he is referring to.

While Takafumi is visiting Setsuko in the hospital, another dominatrix appears, binds his wrists, blindfolds him, strips him, and begins pouring candle wax on his bare chest. Takafumi demands that she leave and hears Setsuko calling out to him before the dominatrix removes his blindfold to reveal Setsuko still comatose - the dominatrix, dubbed the "Voices Queen" for her talent, had emulated Setsuko's voice.

Takafumi contacts the police, who claim they can do nothing as he entered the club voluntarily and aware of its conditions. The Voices Queen visits Takafumi at home and puts him in bondage again. When Arashi walks in on them, she places him in similar bondage, suspending him from the ceiling. Another dominatrix, the "Saliva Queen," arrives and spits on Takafumi while the Voices Queen impersonates various people from Takafumi's life to torment him. Soon after the Voices Queen leaves, the Saliva Queen accidentally falls down the stairs to her death. Takafumi manages to free himself to answer a call from the club president, who berates him for "murdering" the Saliva Queen and threatens his family in retaliation.

After discovering that the doll is a camera, Takafumi drives off with Arashi. The club follows them using a trail of saliva left behind by Arashi, who is still in his blindfold and ball gag. After losing them, Takafumi is approached by a motorcyclist, who claims Setsuko's father is in danger and offers to watch Arashi while Takafumi goes to him. As Takafumi rushes to his father-in-law, the motorcyclist frees Arashi from his bondage, and Arashi immediately flees. Pursuing him, the motorcyclist enters Setsuko's hospital room to discover her being devoured by the "Gobbling Queen," a dominatrix with a monstrously large mouth. Takafumi calls his father-in-law to warn him of the impending danger, unaware that it is the Voices Queen impersonating his father-in-law, who is being swallowed by the Gobbling Queen. Arashi, in the same hypnotic state the dominatrices placed Takafumi into, runs into the middle of the road and is nearly hit by a truck. Takafumi arrives at his father-in-law's house, finds the dominatrices in the kitchen, and fatally shoots them both.

The club's short-tempered, foul-mouthed American CEO arrives at the headquarters and phones Takafumi as he searches the house for his father-in-law. Takafumi reminds her that they have broken their own rules by involving his family. She furiously threatens him before ordering her dominatrices to give him the "elite bondage course." As various dominatrices approach the house, Takafumi hides in the attic and kills them all with grenades he retrieves from the Voices Queen's suitcase. The CEO drags him out of the house and into a garden shed, where she seemingly hypnotizes him again. Later, Takafumi, visibly pregnant, gleefully poses for a maternity shoot with Arashi.

The film occasionally cuts to a subplot of a focus group watching Takafumi's story as a film-within-a-film directed by an elderly filmmaker as his final film. They question the film's bizarre premise and nonsensical plot holes, but the director claims one must have lived to the age of one hundred to truly understand it. As the film ends, the director enters the same euphoric trance Takafumi and Arashi did.

== Cast ==
- Nao Ōmori as Takafumi Katayama
- Shinobu Terajima as Whip Queen
- Hitoshi Matsumoto as Police Officer
- Ai Tominaga as Kicking Queen
- Eriko Sato as Humilation Queen
- Naomi Watanabe as Saliva Queen
- You as Setsuko Katayama
- Suzuki Matsuo as Manager
- Atsuro Watabe as Kishitani
- Gin Maeda as Kiichiro Sugiura
- Katagiri Hairi as Gobble Queen
- Lindsay Kay Hayward as CEO
- Mao Daichi as Voice Queen
- Masaya Takahashi as Theater Audience
- Michié

== Reception ==
R100 received positive reviews from critics. Review aggregator Rotten Tomatoes reports that 81% of 21 film critics have given the film a positive review, with a rating average of 6.7 out of 10.

Rob Nelson of Variety, said in his review that "If a dominatrix is one who takes total control of her passive partner, then 'R100' is the cinematic equivalent of a kinky femme fatale in black leather and stiletto heels, cracking a whip and a smile." Deborah Young in her review for The Hollywood Reporter praised the film by saying that "It's hard to remember a film about S&M as funny as this one, or one as beautifully and weirdly imagined." Colin Covert of Minneapolis Star Tribune gave the film three stars and said that "To call this Midnight Movie entry 'not for everyone' is understating it. But connoisseurs of weird, twisted sex comedy will revel in its transgressive, audacious mischief." Katie Rife of The A.V. Club gave the film a B+.

== Release ==
The film premiered on September 12, 2013, on the Toronto International Film Festival and was released on March 3, 2015, on Blu-ray Disc in a 1080p video format and DVD over Drafthouse Films.
