= Byron Saxton =

American professional wrestling color commentator

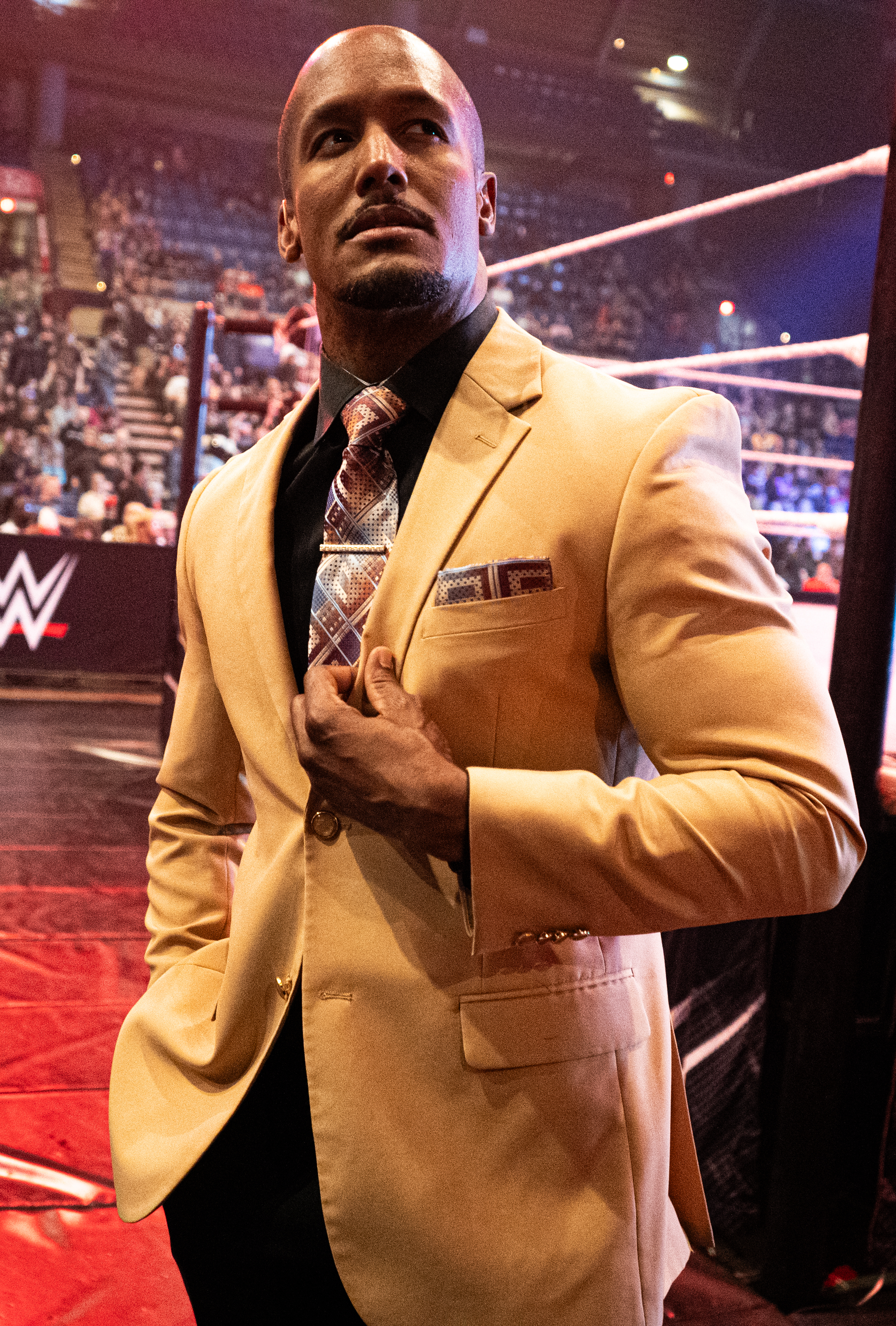
- Saxton in 2024

Personal information
- Born: Bryan Jesús Kelly; August 20, 1981 (age 45) Burke, Virginia, U.S.
- Education: University of Florida

Professional wrestling career
- Ring name(s): Bryan Kelly; Byron Saxton; Michael Cade
- Billed height: 6 ft 1 in (1.85 m)
- Billed weight: 212 lb (96 kg)
- Billed from: Burke, Virginia
- Trained by: Florida Championship Wrestling
- Debut: 2003
- Retired: 2012 (in-ring competition)

Bryan Jesús Kelly (born August 20, 1981), better known by the ring name Byron Saxton, is an American professional wrestling commentator, ring announcer, and former professional wrestler. He is signed to WWE, where he works as a backstage interviewer on Raw, and also serves as a ring announcer for its live events.

Kelly signed with WWE in 2007 as a wrestler and was a "rookie" on the fourth and fifth seasons of NXT. Following his elimination on the latter season of NXT, he began working as a play-by-play and color commentator on NXT before eventually working on other WWE programming, including the company's flagship shows, Monday Night Raw and Friday Night SmackDown. He is also a former one-time WWE 24/7 Champion.

== Early life ==
Kelly was born in Burke, Virginia. He was raised in Burke and Orlando, Florida. He studied at the University of Florida, where he worked as a producer and a reporter for WRUF-AM, WUFT-FM, and WUFT-TV. He graduated in 2003. Kelly worked as an associate producer for WJXT Channel 4 News in Jacksonville, and was then promoted to work on camera as a traffic reporter. It was revealed on The JBL and Cole Show that he was in the same kindergarten class with Alex Riley. Saxton lives in Tampa, Florida.

== Professional wrestling career ==
=== Early career (2003–2007) ===
Kelly made his professional wrestling debut in 2003, wrestling in the independent circuit in Florida and Georgia. In 2004, Kelly auditioned for the fourth season of WWE Tough Enough, but failed to make it past the tryouts. He continued to wrestle on the independent circuit before being offered a WWE tryout in 2007.

=== World Wrestling Entertainment/WWE ===
==== Developmental territories (2007–2012) ====
Kelly signed a developmental contract with World Wrestling Entertainment and was assigned to Florida Championship Wrestling (FCW). Kelly, at first using his real name, made his FCW debut on October 13, 2007, losing to Hade Vansen. His next appearance was just over a week later on October 23, when he lost to "The Carnival Freak" Sinn Bowdee. Kelly competed sporadically on FCW over the next few months, winning a six-man tag team match against Vansen, Sheamus O'Shaunessy and Bowdee with Rycklon Stephens and Chet Douglas as his partners, but losing a singles match to Afa Jr. a few weeks later. He finished off 2007 with a win against Tommy Taylor on December 18.

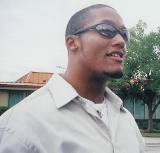
Bryan Kelly in March 2008

Kelly started off 2008 with a win, defeating Steve Lewington on FCW's first show of the year on January 8. His next match against Afa Jr., however, was ruled a no contest after TJ Wilson interfered. Kelly then began teaming with Rycklon, losing to the teams of Nick Nemeth and Big Rob, Jake Hager and Shawn Osborne, and Heath Miller and Steve Lewington. Another match on April 15, when Kelly and Rycklon faced Johnny Curtis and Gabe Tuft ended in a double countout.

On June 3, Kelly became a manager, cutting a promo for Black Pain. Kelly managed Black Pain regularly, accompanying him for matches, and also teaming occasionally with him. On September 30, Kelly debuted a new ring name, Byron Saxton. With Black Pain, and the rest of his faction, known as the Saxton Conglomerate or simply the Conglomerate, composed of Stu Sanders (later Lawrence Knight) and Tyson Tarver, Saxton began a feud with Kafu, having the members of the Conglomerate face off against him in matches. After this feud ended, the Conglomerate quickly began another one with Johnny Prime. In the course of this feud Kaleb O'Neal began teaming with Prime in order to help him out, however, O'Neal later turned on Prime and joined the Conglomerate. In January 2009, Black Pain broke away from the Conglomerate and changed his ring name to Sweet Papi Sanchez, prompting a feud with the remaining Conglomerate members. Following that, Saxton associated himself with Abraham Washington. When Josh Mathews left FCW to commentate on ECW full-time, Saxton began working as a commentator alongside first Dusty Rhodes and then Abraham Washington. In November 2010 Saxton turned on Washington and began feuding with him.

Following his stints on ECW and NXT Redemption, Saxton returned to FCW as a commentator and wore an arm sling, claiming to be injured and unable to compete until the March 4, 2012 episode when Saxton unexpectedly removed his sling and hit Kenneth Cameron with a Coin roll. A match was scheduled between Saxton and Cameron the following week, but Saxton once again claimed to be injured and unable to compete and was replaced in the match by Colin Cassady. Saxton then worked as an announcer for the remainder of FCW's tenure until the promotion was shut down in August 2012.

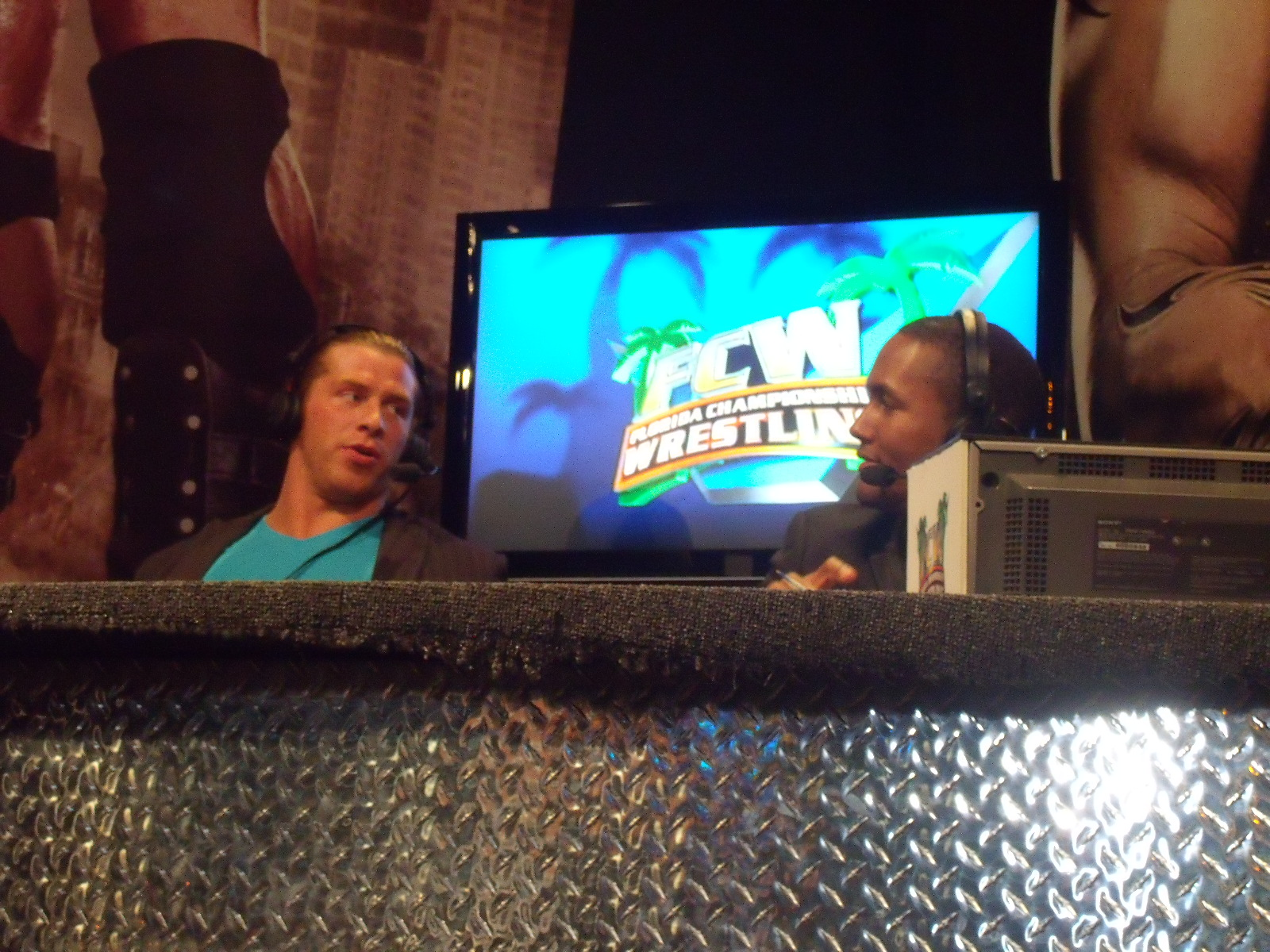
Saxton (right) with Curt Hawkins, commentating on FCW

In October 2009, the SmackDown color commentator, Jim Ross, suffered a Bell's palsy attack, resulting in a shuffle of the other commentators. Matt Striker was moved from ECW to SmackDown, and Saxton was called up to ECW as a commentator, working alongside Josh Mathews. He debuted on the October 27 episode. He continued commentating until February 2010, when Vince McMahon announced that ECW was to be replaced with NXT. Saxton then returned to FCW in March of that year.

On the third-season finale of NXT on November 30 it was announced that Saxton would be competitor on season four, with Chris Masters as his mentor. He made his in-ring debut on the December 14 episode of NXT, teaming with Masters in a loss to Brodus Clay and his mentor, Ted DiBiase. Earlier that night, Saxton won the karaoke challenge, earning a point towards immunity from elimination. He earned his first win on the following episode when he teamed with Masters and WWE Diva Natalya to defeat Clay, DiBiase, and Maryse in a six-person mixed tag team match. On January 4, 2011, episode of NXT, Dolph Ziggler became Saxton's new Pro, after Ziggler won a Battle royal to earn the right to choose a new rookie and he chose Saxton. On the February 8 episode of NXT, Saxton was eliminated.

In March 2011, Saxton was selected as one of the six former NXT contestants to return to the show in its fifth season, NXT Redemption. During this season, Saxton was mentored by Yoshi Tatsu. On the April 26 edition of NXT, Saxton attacked Tatsu after he cost him the match against Lucky Cannon. Going into late May 2011, he began referring to himself as "Big League" Byron Saxton, believing that he is bigger than the NXT Rookies and/or the WWE Pros, turning heel. On May 31, Saxton was voted off of NXT Redemption. After his elimination, Saxton was sent back to FCW, where he would wrestle until his last match in August 2012 before transitioning into a full-time commentator.

==== Commentator and ring announcer (2012–present) ====
Byron Saxton made his return as the play-by-play commentator for the relaunched NXT on the May 17, 2012 taping at Full Sail University. Later on he would become the NXT ring announcer in addition to having some creative responsibilities for the company. Saxton continued to perform as a commentator for NXT until the December 23, 2015 episode of the show.

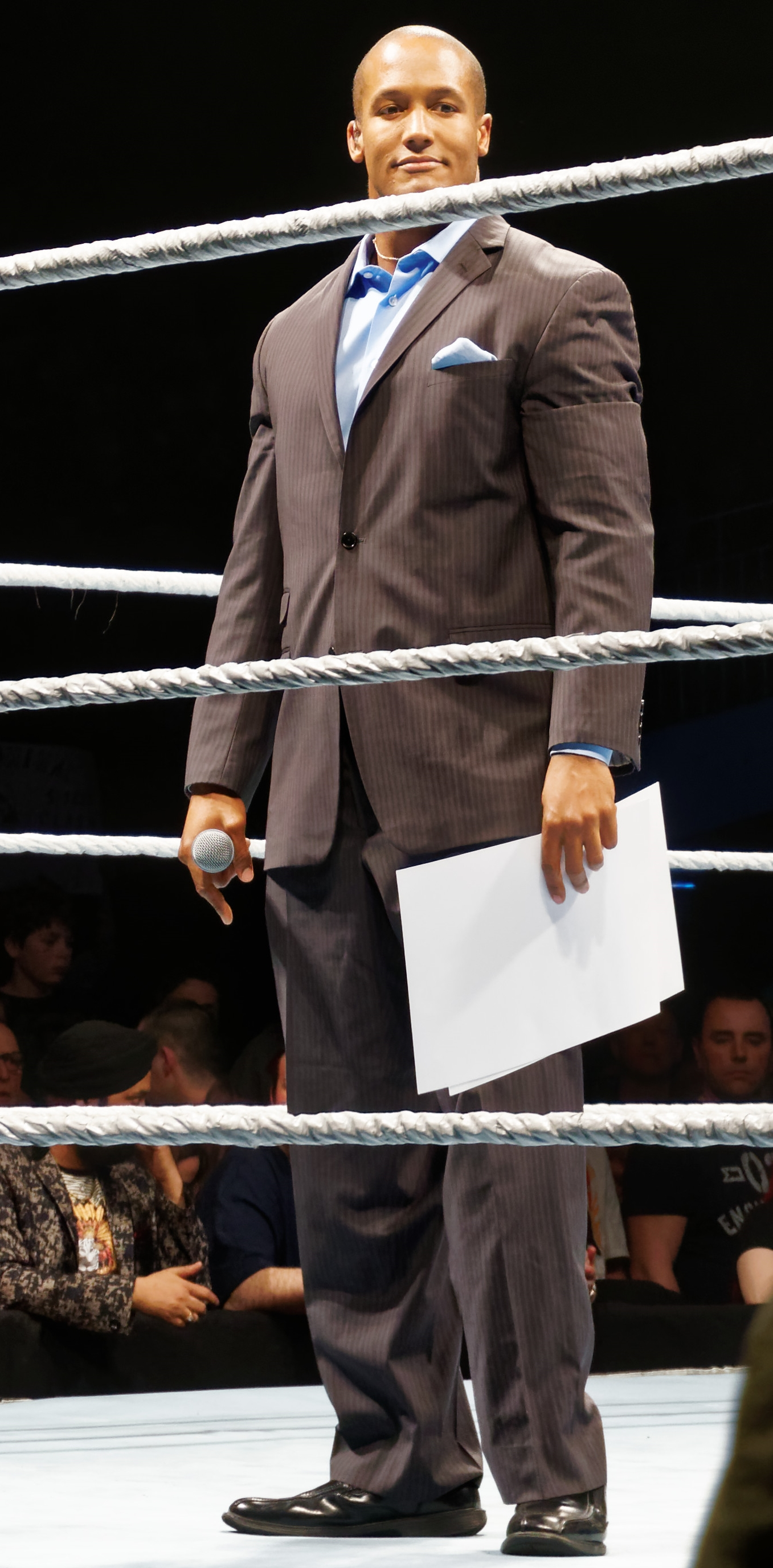
Saxton in April 2016

On January 27, 2014, Saxton made his Raw debut on the WWE App. Three days later on January 30 he appeared alongside Tom Phillips as a commentator on WWE Superstars. On the February 10, 2014 edition of Raw Saxton conducted a backstage interview with Sheamus and was announced as the newest member of the WWE announce team by Michael Cole. Saxton continued to announce on NXT as a heel, while simultaneously appearing neutral on the main roster. On the May 13, 2014 episode of Main Event, Saxton was attacked by Alicia Fox after she lost her match to Emma. On January 8, 2015, it was announced that Saxton would join the announce team on WWE SmackDown and by Fastlane he was called "the voice" of the show.

On the March 30, 2015 edition of Raw the night after WrestleMania 31, Saxton and Jerry Lawler filled in for Michael Cole, JBL, and Booker T after they were brutally assaulted by Brock Lesnar. From the June 8 episode of Raw, Saxton filled in on commentary for Booker T, who would be one of the coaches on the sixth season of WWE Tough Enough, with Jimmy Uso filling in for Saxton on SmackDown. In July, Saxton would become the new host of the WWE Network show, Tough Talk, replacing former host The Miz, who would become the new judge on Tough Enough after the Hulk Hogan scandal. After Tough Enough ended, Saxton was kept on as Raw announcer permanently and Booker T switched to the SmackDown announce team. In December 2015, Saxton left the NXT announce team and rejoined the SmackDown announce team along with Mauro Ranallo, replacing Booker T and Rich Brennan. Saxton left the SmackDown announce team in July 2016 and became exclusive to the Raw announce team following the 2016 WWE Draft, performing as a face commentator in contrast to Corey Graves' heel commentary. Saxton's character is often bullied by villainous characters, including Graves, John "Bradshaw" Layfield and Kevin Owens and, occasionally, by fellow babyface commentator, Michael Cole. On April 10, after Raw went off-air, it was announced that Saxton was traded to the SmackDown brand in exchange for David Otunga.

On January 27, 2020, Saxton returned to the Raw announce team alongside Tom Phillips and Jerry Lawler. On May 15, he became the play-by-play commentator on 205 Live. On the November 8, 2021 episode of Raw, Saxton pinned Corey Graves to win the WWE 24/7 Championship, but lost it seconds later to Drake Maverick.

On April 1, 2022 at WrestleMania 38, after the main event match between Stone Cold Steve Austin and Kevin Owens, Austin invited Saxton for a beer party before hitting him with the Stone Cold Stunner. On November 5, 2023, Saxton served as the ring announcer for Crown Jewel. Throughout February 2024, Saxton performed as the color commentator for NXT, filling in for Booker T while he recovered from a medical procedure.

== Championships and accomplishments ==
- Southern Championship Wrestling
  - SCW Florida Tag Team Championship (1 time) – with Chris Nelson
- Pro Wrestling Illustrated
  - Ranked him No. 223 of the top 500 singles wrestlers in the PWI 500 in 2011
- United States Championship Wrestling
  - USCW Heavyweight Championship (1 time)
- WWE
  - WWE 24/7 Championship (1 time)

Preceded by Jon Quasto	205 Live lead announcer 2020	Succeeded by Vic Joseph
