= Isis the Amazon =

American film actress and professional wrestler

Lindsay Kay Hayward
Personal information
- Born: July 28, 1987 (age 39) Walnut Creek, California, U.S
- Children: 1

Professional wrestling career
- Ring name(s): Isis the Amazon; Aloisia
- Billed height: 6 ft 8 1/4 in (2.04 m)
- Billed from: Los Angeles, California, U.S
- Trained by: Soulman Alex G, Florida Championship Wrestling
- Debut: April 17, 2008
- Retired: May 31, 2011

Lindsay Kay Hayward (born July 28, 1987) is an American actress, reality television star, retired fetish model, and professional wrestler, better known by her ring name Isis The Amazon. She is best known for her Guinness World Record, certifying her as the "tallest actress in a leading role", originally standing 6-foot-9, however, she lost 3/4 inches in height due to a slipped disc. She was also a cast member on the TLC reality television show, My Giant Life.

== Early life ==
Born in Walnut Creek, California to Ellen Roney, Hayward played for the Rocklin Thunder at Rocklin High School in Rocklin, California. She played basketball for Forest Lake Christian High School and helped her team win the sectional championships. She has a sister named Tabitha.

== Acting career ==
Hayward began her acting career as a fetish model, appearing in softcore pornography videos.

In 2013, she landed her first leading role as a 7-foot-tall CEO in the film R100. In 2014, she was awarded a Guinness World Record for being the tallest actress in a leading role. In 2014, she played Katjia in the film The Internship Games and in 2015, she played Cassie in the film Rumors. She went on to take on various other roles; most notably in an episode of Grey's Anatomy.

She featured in an episode for BuzzFeedVideo in 2014. In 2015, she was an official cast member in the TLC reality television series, My Giant Life. This led to her appearing regularly on various news stations and talk shows.

== Professional wrestling career ==
=== Independent Circuit (2008–2010) ===
On April 17, 2008, ICWMiami discovered Hayward while she was hosting events at the Exxxotica Convention. She was introduced to "Soulman" Alex G, who became her trainer, she began appearing on the independent circuit as a valet for the ICW Tag Team Champions, Dade County Collision. In late 2008, she made her in-ring debut under the ring name Isis the Amazon, challenging Tracy Taylor for the Professional Girl Wrestling Association Championship. She began competing for various independent promotions between 2009 and 2010, including Coastal Championship Wrestling, Juggalo Championship Wrestling and Rampage Pro Wrestling.

=== WWE (2010) ===
==== Florida Championship developmental and NXT (2010) ====
Hayward signed with the WWE in 2010, reporting to their developmental territory, Florida Championship Wrestling. She was announced as a contestant on the third season of WWE NXT under the new ring name, Aloisia, despite never wrestling a match for the company she was promoted as the tallest Diva to ever compete in WWE history. She was set to be paired with Vickie Guerrero as her on-screen mentor, but was replaced by eventual winner Kaitlyn, before the season began airing. Hayward was fired by Guerrero in storyline due to her dissatisfaction with Hayward; however, it was reported that Hayward was fired from the company only a few weeks after signing her contract, due to the WWE discovering that she had posed for softcore and fetish pornography.

=== Independent Circuit return (2010–2011) ===
Hayward returned to the independent circuit between the years of 2010 to 2011, competing for Absolute Intense Wrestling, Lucha Libre USA, National Wrestling Alliance and Signature Pro Wrestling. In 2011, she made her debut for Total Nonstop Action Wrestling (TNA) defeating Leva Bates in a match that was cut from the television broadcast. It was reported that TNA were unsatisfied with Hayward's wrestling ability, labelling her green, it was also reported that she had a poor attitude backstage. She wrestled one last match on the independent circuit in May, 2011, before silently retiring from the wrestling business.

In 2016, she began training with Brian Kendrick for a potential return to professional wrestling, but it never came to fruition and she has since remained retired. She has since stated that she still wishes to perform at WrestleMania one day.

== Personal life ==
Her son Liam was born on September 12, 2017.

== Filmography ==
Television
Year	Title	Role	Notes
2010	KTLA	Self; feature	1 episode
2010	WWE NXT season 3	Self; contestant	Disqualified
2013	R100	CEO	
2014	BuzzFeedVideo	Self; feature	Web series, 1 episode
2014	TMZ on TV	Self; interviewee	1 episode
2014	Teens Wanna Know	Self; guest	1 episode
2014	The Internship Games	Katja	
2015	Rumors	Cassie	
2015	Grey's Anatomy season 12	Jade Bell	1 episode
2015-2017	My Giant Life	Self; cast member	22 episodes
2015	The Today Show	Self; interviewee	1 episode
2015	Inside Edition	Self; interviewee	1 episode
2015	Access Hollywood	Self; interviewee	1 episode
2015	Home & Family	Self; interviewee	1 episode
2015	Facets	Self; feature	1 episode
2015	Hollywood Today Live	Self; interviewee	1 episode
2015	The Wendy Williams Show	Self; interviewee	1 episode
2017	Fox News	Self; interviewee	1 episode
2017	The Lyndon Experience	Self; interviewee	1 episode
2022	Gimme My Money	Bunny	Filmed, cancelled
2024	Inside Edition	Self; feature	1 episode
2026	Scrubs	Big Gina	1 episode
