= Percy Watson =

American football player and professional wrestler (born 1981)

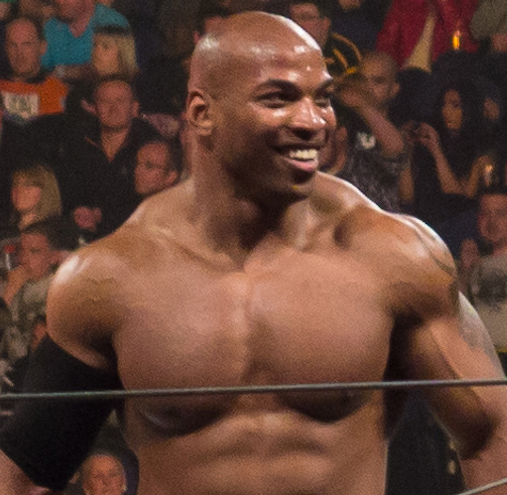
- Watson in 2012

Personal information
- Born: Nicholas Christopher McNeil; August 19, 1981 (age 45) Leland, North Carolina, U.S.
- Education: Western Carolina University
- Children: 1

Professional wrestling career
- Ring name(s): Nick McNeil; Chris McNeil; Percy Watson; Cordell Porter; The Unknown Hand
- Billed height: 6 ft 3 in (191 cm)
- Billed weight: 245 lb (111 kg)
- Billed from: South Beach, Florida
- Trained by: FCW
- Debut: 2009
- Retired: 2021

Nicholas Christopher McNeil (born August 19, 1981), better known by his ring name Percy Watson, is an American retired professional wrestler, commentator, and former professional football player. He is best known for his time with WWE as an in-ring performer and later as a commentator on NXT, 205 Live, and WWE Main Event.

== College and professional football career ==
Nick McNeil graduated from Western Carolina University with a bachelor's degree in computer information systems. He was a three time All-Southern Conference selection at left defensive end for the Catamounts. As a sophomore, he led the Southern Conference in sacks with 10. As a junior, he led the conference in fumble recoveries. He finished his collegiate career tied for fourth all-time on the WCU tackles-for-loss list with 45. He finished sixth on the WCU all-time sack list with 18.5. McNeil had experience in professional football from 2004-2006, spending time on the National Football League practice squads of the Green Bay Packers and Washington Redskins, as well as being on the offseason rosters of the Pittsburgh Steelers and New York Giants. He was promoted to the Redskins' active roster on January 9, 2006, during the playoffs, but he did not play in any games.

== Professional wrestling career ==
=== World Wrestling Entertainment / WWE ===
==== Florida Championship Wrestling (2009–2011) ====
McNeil signed a developmental deal with World Wrestling Entertainment in 2009 and began training with their developmental territory, Florida Championship Wrestling (FCW). He made his FCW debut in September 2009 under his real name Nick McNeil, however shortly after that he tweaked his name to Chris McNeil. On October 1, 2009, he re-introduced himself as Percy Watson along with his tag team partner Darren Young and they called themselves the South Beach Party Boys.

==== NXT (2010–2013) ====
McNeil participated in the second season of NXT under the name of Percy Watson, with Montel Vontavious Porter as his mentor. Watson made his debut on the June 8, 2010 episode of NXT with the nickname "Showtime" Percy Watson, teaming with MVP and defeating Husky Harris and Cody Rhodes. Watson was noted for being fun, energetic and similar to Eddie Murphy. As part of his gimmick, Watson wore red glasses and even wrestled with his glasses on.

In the NXT poll on the June 29 episode, Watson was ranked in second place, just behind Kaval. On July 6, Watson won the Talk-the-Talk challenge and was rewarded with the chance to host a talk show the following week. In his talk show segment, Watson had his Pro MVP as his talk show guest. However, in order to make a statement, Watson tried to set up MVP to receive an attack from the other Rookies, but the other Pros came to MVP's aid. On the July 20 episode of NXT, Watson was a guest on MVP's VIP Lounge, where he was confronted by MVP about his actions the previous week. The two made amends after a heartfelt apology from Watson. On the July 27 episode of NXT, Watson became the first Rookie to defeat a Pro in a singles match by defeating Zack Ryder. On the August 17 episode of NXT, Watson was eliminated from the show, finishing fifth overall. After Season 2 of NXT, Watson then competed in various dark matches but never appeared on WWE programming.

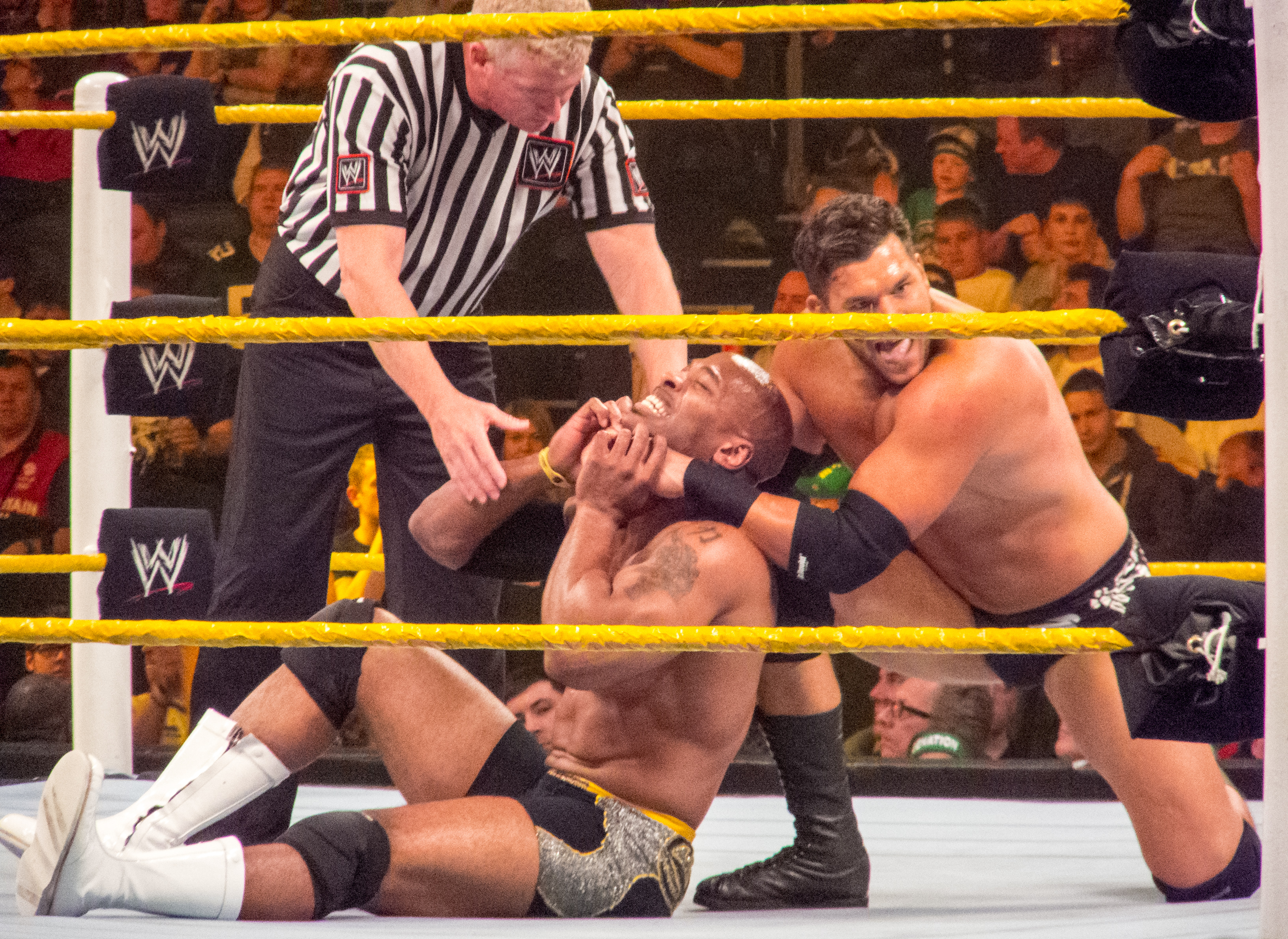
McNeil as Percy Watson against Johnny Curtis in a match on NXT in 2012.

Watson returned on WWE programming on the September 8 episode of WWE Superstars without glasses and with a more toned-down gimmick, teaming with Titus O'Neil in a losing effort against Curt Hawkins and Tyler Reks. He then redebuted on the fifth season of NXT not as a Rookie, but as Titus O'Neil's friend and tag team partner. Watson and O'Neil would enjoy success against Derrick Bateman and Tyson Kidd, as well as Bateman and JTG. However, Watson and O'Neil would find themselves unable to beat Darren Young and JTG. Watson would also compete as a singles competitor on NXT, earning wins against the likes of Tyler Reks and Heath Slater.

After O'Neil turned his back on the fans, he urged Watson to do the same on the January 25, 2012 episode of NXT. When Watson refused, O'Neil shoved him and a match between the two was booked, leading to O'Neil defeating Watson. O'Neil continued to attack Watson after the match, leading to Alex Riley saving Watson. On the February 1 and February 29 episodes of NXT, Watson and Riley teamed up to face O'Neil and Young, but were defeated both times. On the March 7 episode of NXT, Watson received his rematch against O'Neil and defeated O'Neil. From late April, Watson was involved in a storyline in which he was blamed for various backstage attacks on other wrestlers, but the storyline was abruptly dropped as NXT Redemption drew to a close. On the final episode of the fifth season of NXT on June 13, Watson teamed with Derrick Bateman in a loss to Curt Hawkins and Tyler Reks.

After the conclusion of NXT Redemption, NXT transitioned into the renamed Florida Championship Wrestling developmental territory. Watson continued on appearing on the rebooted NXT in a loss to Jinder Mahal on the July 18 episode of NXT. It would be the start of a losing streak for Watson, who went on to lose to the likes of Kassius Ohno and Leo Kruger in 2012. Watson then formed an occasional team with Yoshi Tatsu, but they could find no success either; losing to the Ascension (Conor O'Brian and Kenneth Cameron) on the November 14, 2012 episode of NXT. On the January 23, 2013 episode of NXT, Watson and Tatsu entered the NXT Tag Team Championship Tournament to crown the inaugural champions but were defeated by The Wyatt Family (Luke Harper and Erick Rowan) in the first round. On May 17, 2013, Watson was released; his final televised match was a loss in a six-man tag match against The Shield.

=== Independent circuit (2014) ===
After being released, Watson made his independent debut on June 14, 2014 at Universal Championship Wrestling event called UCW Hometown Throwdown, in Georgia where he lost to Lance Hoyt.

=== Return to WWE (2016–2019) ===
On November 30, 2016, at the NXT taping, Watson returned as the third man in the broadcast booth, joining Tom Phillips and Corey Graves. Graves made a full-time move to the Raw brand's commentary booth in early 2017, with Nigel McGuinness joining Watson and Phillips. On April 10, 2018, Watson debuted as a color commentator on 205 Live, alongside Vic Joseph and also on Main Event by next day.

Watson was replaced on 205 Live by Aiden English as of January 22, 2019 and moved to NXT. During WrestleMania 35 weekend he did commentary for Worlds Collide with Vic Joseph. In April he was replaced on Main Event by various people including Sam Roberts and David Otunga. At the NXT tapings in May, he was replaced on the commentary team by Beth Phoenix. On May 11, it was reported Watson would be departing the company to pursue ventures outside of wrestling.

== Championships and accomplishments ==
- Pro Wrestling Illustrated
  - Ranked No. 238 of the top 500 singles wrestlers in the PWI 500 in 2010

== See also ==
- List of gridiron football players who became professional wrestlers
