= Eli Cottonwood =

American professional wrestler

Personal information
- Born: Kipp Christianson; September 30, 1974 (age 51) River Falls, Wisconsin, U.S.

Professional wrestling career
- Ring name(s): Eli Cottonwood; Kip Christianson
- Billed height: 7 ft 1 in (2.16 m)
- Billed weight: 330 lb (150 kg)
- Trained by: Steve Keirn
- Debut: 2008
- Retired: 2016

Kipp Christianson (born September 30, 1974) is an American retired professional wrestler. He is best known for his time in WWE's developmental territory FCW, where he wrestled under the ring name Eli Cottonwood from 2009 to 2012.

== Early life ==
Kipp Christianson was born in River Falls, Wisconsin, on September 30, 1974. He played college basketball.

== Professional wrestling career ==
Trained by Steve Keirn, Christianson began competing under his real name in WWE's developmental territory FCW in 2008. On July 15, 2009, he had his debut match as a heel under the new ring name Eli Cottonwood, a man who had recently been reintroduced to society after a stint at the Battle Creek Sanitarium. He defeated Fred Rosser in the match. Aksana began managing him in November 2009 and he soon turned face. On June 1, 2010, John Morrison announced that he would be mentoring Cottonwood in the second season of NXT. Cottonwood was eliminated from the competition on the July 27 episode of NXT, becoming the second competitor to be eliminated after Titus O'Neil.

Cottonwood returned to FCW on November 4, 2010, and lost to Big E Langston in a match that ended his undefeated FCW streak. On December 5, 2011, he had a one-off appearance on WWE's main roster, losing a dark match to Dolph Ziggler on Raw. In April 2012, he turned heel and aligned himself with Bray Wyatt. He requested his release from WWE two months later and retired in 2016. He later owned a yoga studio in Las Vegas called Kipp's Life Flip from 2016 to 2018 and co-owned Florida Hardcore Wrestling from 2016 to 2017.
